= 2023 Nigerian presidential election =

- 25 February 2023
- Registered: 93,469,008
- Turnout: 26.71% (▼8.04 pp)
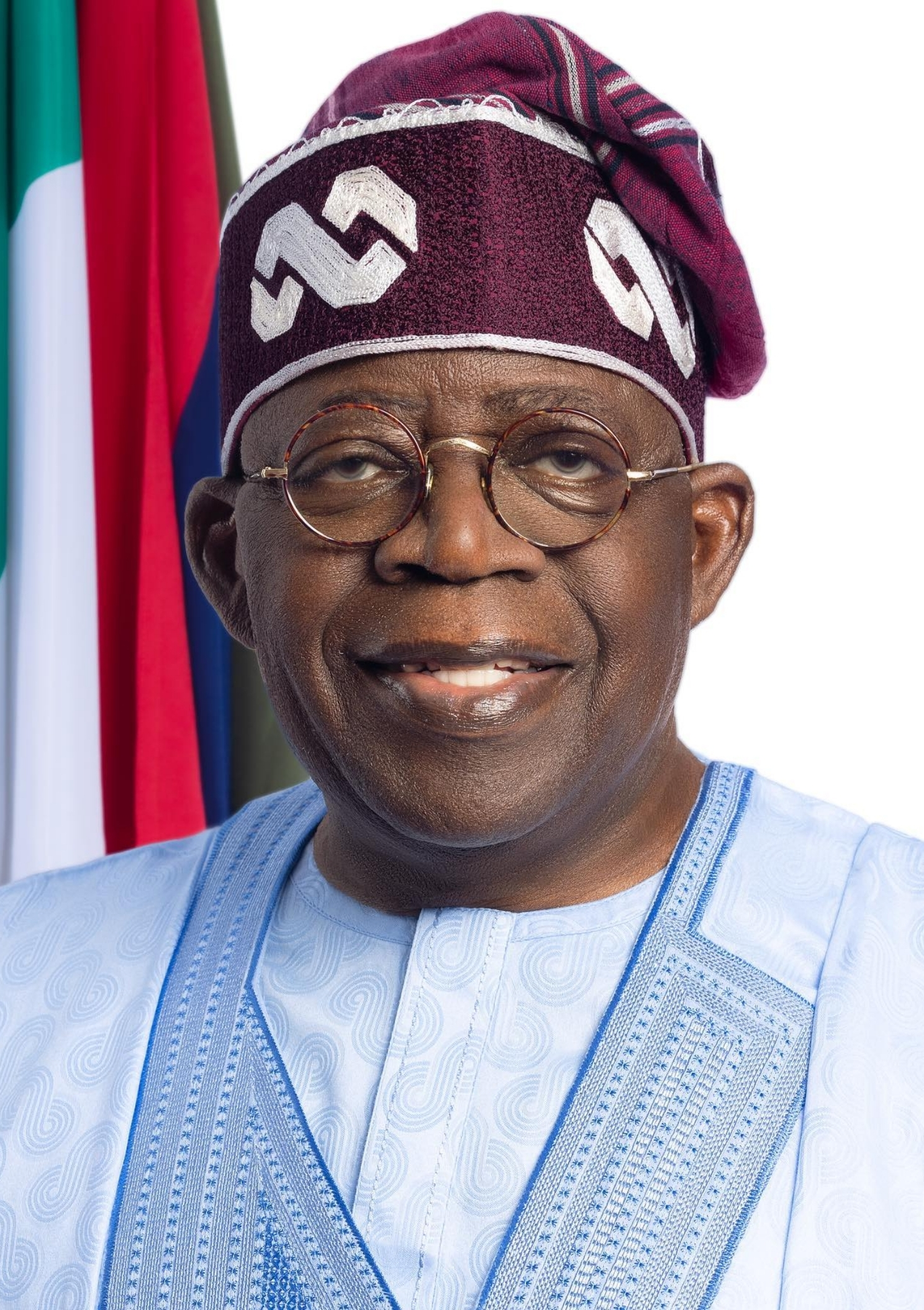

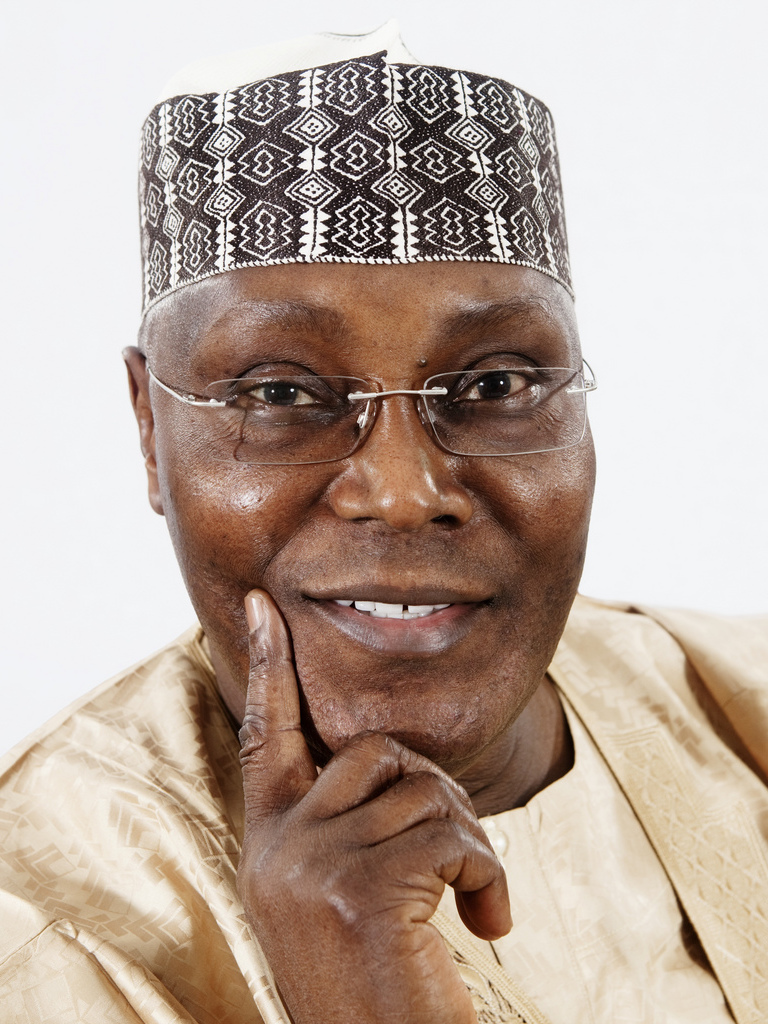

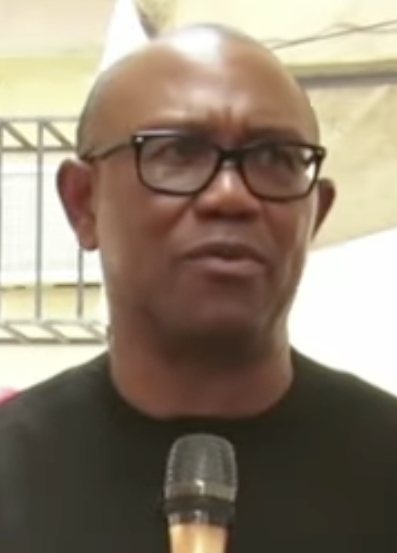

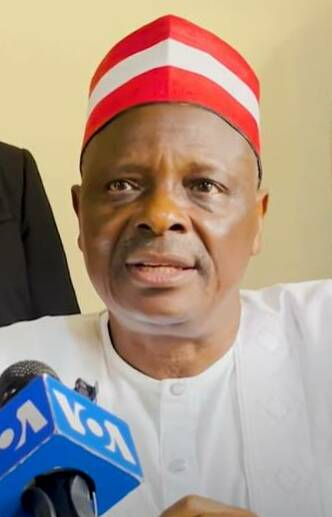
Nominee	Bola Tinubu	Atiku Abubakar
Party	APC	PDP
Home state	Lagos	Adamawa
Running mate	Kashim Shettima	Ifeanyi Okowa
States carried	12	12
Popular vote	8,794,726	6,984,520
Percentage	36.61%	29.07%
Nominee	Peter Obi	Rabiu Kwankwaso
Party	LP	NNPP
Home state	Anambra	Kano
Running mate	Yusuf Datti Baba-Ahmed	Isaac Idahosa
States carried	11 + FCT	1
Popular vote	6,101,533	1,496,687
Percentage	25.40%	6.40%
President before election
Muhammadu Buhari
APC
Elected President
Bola Ahmed Tinubu
APC

A Presidential election was held on 25 February 2023 in Nigeria (Note: Due to disruptions—mainly violence or technical issues—on election day, INEC either postponed or extended voting to 26 February in certain affected areas.) to elect the president and vice president. All Progressives Congress (APC) nominee Bola Tinubu defeated Atiku Abubakar of the Peoples Democratic Party and Peter Obi of Labour Party.

Party's primary elections were conducted between 4 April and 9 June 2022; Peoples Democratic Party (PDP) nominated Atiku Abubakar while All Progressives Congress (APC) chose Bola Tinubu as their nominee. The dominance of the two major parties began to fray as a revived party, the Labour Party (LP), nominated Peter Obi, former governor of Anambra State while another party, New Nigeria Peoples Party (NNPP), nominated Rabiu Kwankwaso, former governor of Kano State. The vice presidential candidates were announced some weeks later, and the nominees were Ifeanyi Okowa for PDP, Yusuf Datti Baba-Ahmed for LP, Kashim Shettima for APC, and Isaac Idahosa for NNPP.

Corruption, electoral malpractice, and insecurity, among others were issues during the election. Others include views for the reformation of the Independent National Electoral Commission (INEC), who rather cumulated the results from the polling units manually after failing to upload them online through the result viewing portal as assured to the citizens.

The results were announced on 26 February at the National Collation Centre in Abuja, where INEC declared the presidential and vice presidential nominees for APC as the winner in 1 March. The result was rejected by some international bodies as well as the opposition parties who criticised the results and legally challenged it. Former president Olusegun Obasanjo also called for the re-run of the election, citing fraud and violence.

== Electoral system ==
The President of Nigeria is elected using a modified two-round system with up to three rounds. To be elected in the first round, a candidate must receive a plurality of the national vote and over 25% of the vote in at least 24 of the 36 states and the Federal Capital Territory. If no candidate passes this threshold, a second round is held between the top candidate and the candidate winning the second-highest number of states. To win in the second round, a candidate must receive the most votes nationally and over 25% of the vote in at least 24 of the 36 states and the Federal Capital Territory. If neither candidate passes this threshold, a third round is held where a simple majority of the national vote is required to be elected.

== Background ==
Muhammadu Buhari of the All Progressives Congress (APC) won the 2019 Nigerian presidential election. He defeated Atiku Abubakar of the People's Democratic Party (PDP) with a margin of 3,928,869 votes. APC and PDP are the major dominating parties in Nigeria. However, APC mostly won the elections of the legislative elections; House of Representatives and the Senate. PDP held a convention at Abuja 30 October 2021 ahead of the 2023 presidential election after losing in 2015 and 2019.

Ahead of Buhari's second term, his promises included the completion of in-process rail lines, roads and other infrastructural projects, empowering of youths, improvement of schools and industrial parks as well as inclusion of women in government and creating anti-corruption initiatives. His first term was commended for improving, among others, the agricultural sector, infrastructures like the Akanu Ibiam International Airport, and rail lines. Meanwhile, he faced criticism for abandoning anti-corruption initiatives, poor economy and quality of life, insecurity, and terrorism Other events include censorship by banning Twitter after the site removed an abusive tweet he posted in reference to the Nigerian Civil War, handling of the October 2020 protest for End SARS especially the Lekki massacre in Lagos, where several peaceful protesters were killed by the Army.

== Primary elections ==
The primaries election was previously scheduled between 4 April and 3 June 2022 but was later extended to 9 June. Since 1999, Nigeria's two major political parties–APC and PDP— have practised presidential zoning, which sought for geographical balance between the president and his vice. It states that each cannot be from the same geographical location rather either south and the other north or vice versa. Hence a new president should be from the south. Both parties had series of internal debates over zoning and same religion tickets before the primary. Nevertheless, both parties declined zoning. PDP nominated a northerner Atiku Abubakar while APC nominated a southerner Bola Tinubu. APC nominee also chose a Muslim-Muslim ticket while PDP did not.

=== All Progressives Congress ===
2022 All Progressives Congress presidential primary
- 8 June 2022
- Turnout: 91.09%
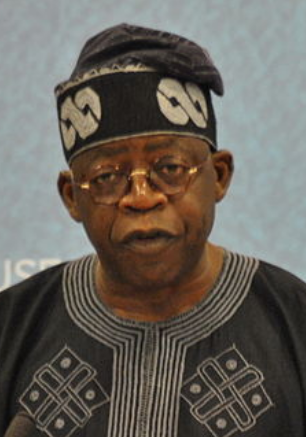

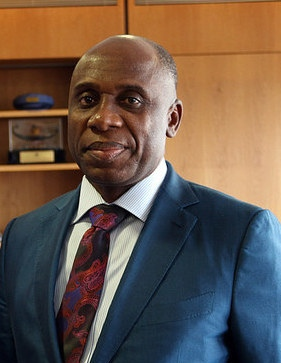

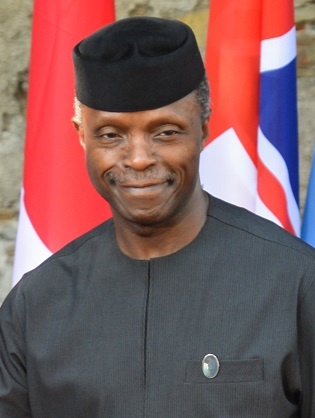
Nominee	Bola Tinubu	Rotimi Amaechi	Yemi Osinbajo
Party	APC	APC	APC
Home state	Lagos	Rivers	Ogun
Popular vote	1,271	316	235
Percentage	60.5%	15.0%	11.2%
Elected Presidential Nominee
Bola Tinubu
APC

With Muhammadu Buhari having been elected to the presidency twice, he was ineligible for renomination. In July 2021, then-national APC Caretaker chairman and Yobe State Governor Mai Mala Buni backed the consensus method of nominating a presidential candidate instead of the more common direct or indirect primary methods but the party did not come to a decision on the primary method at the time. During Buni's term as Caretaker chairman from 2020 to 2022, he campaigned heavily for prominent PDP members to defect to the APC, weakening the opposition's caucus in the National Assembly and gaining three governors—Ebonyi State's Dave Umahi, Cross River State's Benedict Ayade, and Zamfara State's Bello Muhammad Matawalle—in 2020 and 2021. However, the APC's electoral performance and party unity were more mixed as it came a distant third in the 2021 Anambra State gubernatorial election (Note: On election day, Andy Uba and Emeka Okafor were officially listed as the APC gubernatorial and deputy gubernatorial nominees, respectively. However, in December 2021, a Federal High Court nullified the APC gubernatorial primary and declared Uba's nomination illegal, null, and void.) and was still beset by infighting. The APC primary was framed in the wider context of internal party feuds stemming from the APC's formation in 2013 and pre-2019 election party crises to the 2020 removal of party leadership and contentious 2021 state party congresses. The ability of the APC national caretaker committee to resolve state party factionisations and properly organise the 2022 national party convention was seen as vital for both the APC's presidential chances and its future as a party. After several postponements, the convention was successfully held on 26 March 2022 despite some controversy over the consensus method used for most party offices.

In terms of zoning, there was no announced formal zoning agreement for the APC nomination despite calls from certain politicians and interest groups such as the Southern Governors' Forum to zone the nomination to the South as Buhari, a Northerner, was elected twice. Countering its proponents were prospective candidates from the North and the Northern Governors' Forum, which did not oppose a southern presidency but initially disagreed with formal zoning. On the other hand, there were few proponents of a same religion ticket, mainly supporters and allies of eventual nominee Bola Tinubu who argued that there were few powerful Northern Christian APC politicians who could be his running mate. Allies of other potential candidates and groups like the Christian Association of Nigeria came out strongly against the idea of a same religion ticket on grounds of national unity and religious harmony.

On 20 April 2022, the APC National Executive Committee announced the party timetable for the presidential primary and that the primary would use the indirect primary method. The announcement set the party's expression of interest form price at ₦30 million and the nomination form price at ₦70 million with a 50% nomination form discount for candidates younger than 40 while women and candidates with disabilities get free nomination forms. Forms were to be sold from 26 April to 6 May until the deadline was later extended to 10 May then 12 May. After the submission of nomination forms by 13 May, candidates were to be screened by a party committee on 24 and 25 May but it was delayed several times to while the screening appeal process will take place afterwards. Ward congresses and LGA congresses were rescheduled for between 12 and 14 May to elect "ad hoc delegates" for the primary. Candidates approved by the screening process were to advance to a primary set for 30 May and 1 June but the party delayed the primary to 6–8 June.

Before the primary, controversy over the prospective electors emerged due to the legal ramifications of the amended Electoral Act. After years of debate and public pressure, Buhari signed a new Electoral Act in January 2022 that drastically reformed election and electoral systems for both primary and general elections. One of the reforms was the exclusion of ex officio "statutory delegates"—thousands of current and former officeholders—from voting in party primaries; National Assembly leadership said the exclusion was inadvertent and in May, NASS passed an amendment to the act to allow statutory delegates to vote in primaries. However, Buhari refused to sign the amendment into law, forcing the APC to suddenly prohibit statutory delegates from voting. Not only did the action prevent Buhari and other high-ranking officeholders from voting, it drastically reduced the number of delegates from over 7,800 to just the 2,322 elected "ad hoc delegates".

The pre-primary period was dominated by questions about major candidates and Buhari's endorsement. Of the formally announced candidates, analysts viewed six as the major contenders: Rotimi Amaechi—former Minister of Transportation and former Governor of Rivers State, Kayode Fayemi—Governor of Ekiti State, Ahmad Lawan—Senate President, Yemi Osinbajo—Vice President, former science minister Ogbonnaya Onu, and Bola Tinubu—former Governor of Lagos State. However, two potential surprises emerged: former President Goodluck Jonathan and Governor of the Central Bank Godwin Emefiele. Groups purchasing forms on behalf of Emefiele and Jonathan coupled with months of speculation about their candidacies led to rumours of a plot to impose one of the two as nominee despite the legally-mandated nonpartisanship of Emefiele's office and Jonathan's membership in the PDP; neither candidacy came to fruition as Jonathan refused the forms, while Emefiele was forced to withdraw due to public pressure. The other main question was Buhari's endorsement; despite months of contending that he would not weigh in on the primary, about a week before the primary, Buhari held a meeting with APC governors where he asked them to support his preferred candidate. Reports emerged that while the vast majority of governors agreed, a few rejected the proposal or did not state their position. Another point of contention was the oft-postponed candidate screening, where a committee led by former APC National chairman John Odigie Oyegun cleared all twenty-three candidates but recommended only thirteen candidates continue their campaigns due to their perceived chances of victory.

In the days directly before the primary, the vast majority of northern APC governors released a letter in support of a southern nominee where they also asked northern candidates to withdraw; in response, one northern candidate withdrew from the primary. Later that day (4 June 2022), Buhari held a meeting with most APC candidates where he reportedly privately backed a nominee from the south and told the candidates to find a consensus nominee amongst themselves. However, on 6 June—the day before primary voting, national party chairman Abdullahi Adamu told northern APC governors that the party's (and Buhari's) consensus candidate would be Lawan; the announcement was met with opposition by governors and other members of the party's National Working Committee leading the party to backtrack and claim that Adamu was just expressing his personal opinion. The same day, Buhari stated that he had no anointed candidate in the primary. Then early on primary day, APC governors and the party NWC made a joint recommendation of five southern candidates—Amaechi, Fayemi, Osinbajo, Tinubu, and Governor of Ebonyi State Dave Umahi—to Buhari while asking all other aspirants to withdraw from the race. Seven other candidates released a joint statement rejecting the shortlist while all six southeastern candidates penned a letter to Buhari asking that the nomination be zoned to the South-East.

On the day of the primary, delegates gathered in Eagle Square, Abuja to be accredited and vote. The early part of the exercise was beset by logistical issues as there were significant delays in both delegate and journalist accreditation along with the deployment of tear gas by security to disperse crowds. Meanwhile, inside the Square, Economic and Financial Crimes Commission personnel took positions to prevent bribery before candidates gave their final speeches to the delegates before voting. During these speeches, six candidates—Godswill Akpabio, Ibikunle Amosun, Dimeji Bankole, Robert Ajayi Boroffice, Fayemi, and Uju Kennedy Ohanenye—stepped down in favour of Tinubu and one aspirant—Nicholas Felix—withdrew for Osinbajo while the remaining candidates issued promises and proposals for their prospective campaigns. After the candidate's speeches and an address by Buhari, voting began in the early morning of 8 June and after hours of voting, votes were publicly tabulated. When collation was completed, Bola Tinubu emerged as nominee after results showed him winning 60% of the votes with a margin of 45% over runner-up Amaechi. In his acceptance speech, Tinubu thanked his team while striking a conciliatory tone in regards to his former opponents. Post-primary analysis noted multiple potential reasons for Tinubu's victory, namely: other candidates' focus on a Buhari endorsement that never came, the failure of Buhari's succession plan, bribery, and the last-minute withdrawals. The week after the primary were based around the search for Tinubu's running mate, as Tinubu is a southern Muslim, it was expected that his running mate would be a northern Christian but controversy emerged as some prominent APC politicians stated their openness to a Muslim-Muslim ticket. As the deadline neared, the party submitted the name of Kabir Ibrahim Masari—a politician and party operative from Katsina State—as a placeholder vice presidential nominee to be substituted at a later date. On 10 July, Ibrahim Masari withdrew and Tinubu announced Kashim Shettima—a senator and former Governor of Borno State—as his running mate after a meeting with Buhari in Daura. Breaking the anti-same religion ticket convention, Tinubu argued in a statement that "religion...cannot always and fully determine our path" and that he picked "the man who can help me bring the best governance to all Nigerians, period, regardless of their religious affiliation" and compared the ticket to the last Yoruba Muslim-Kanuri Muslim ticket, the successful M. K. O. Abiola-Baba Gana Kingibe slate in 1993. Opponents, like the Christian Association of Nigeria and civil society groups, derided the nomination as divisive in a trying time for Nigerian unity. Analysts noted the previous reports from before Tinubu was nominated he said that his inner circle did not think a Northern Christian would help the party in the majority-Muslim states and thus a fellow Muslim should be picked.

==== Nominated ====
- Bola Tinubu: former Governor of Lagos State (1999–2007) and former Senator for Lagos West (1992–1993) (Note: This candidate was recommended by the party screening committee.) (Note: This candidate was recommended by APC governors and the party National Working Committee.)
  - Running mate—Kashim Shettima: Senator for Borno Central (2019–present), former Governor of Borno State (2011–2019), and son of former Governor of Northern Nigeria Kashim Ibrahim

==== Eliminated in primary ====
- Rotimi Amaechi: former Minister of Transportation (2015–2019; 2019–2022), former Governor of Rivers State (2007–2015), and former Speaker of the Rivers State House of Assembly (1999–2007)
- Benedict Ayade: Governor of Cross River State (2015–present) and former Senator for Cross River North (2011–2015) (Note: This candidate was not recommended by the party screening committee.) (Note: This candidate was not recommended by APC governors and the party National Working Committee.)
- Tunde Bakare: pastor
- Yahaya Bello: Governor of Kogi State (2016–present)
- Tein Jack-Rich: businessman
- Ahmad Lawan: Senator for Yobe North (2007–present), President of the Senate (2019–present), and former House of Representatives member for Bade/Jakusko (1999–2007)
- Ikeobasi Mokelu: former Minister of Information and Culture
- Chukwuemeka Nwajiuba: former Minister of State for Education (2019–2022) and former House of Representatives member for Ehime Mbano/Ihitte Uboma/Obowo (2019; 1999–2003)
- Rochas Okorocha: Senator for Imo West (2019–present) and former Governor of Imo State (2011–2019)
- Ogbonnaya Onu: former Minister of Science, Technology and Innovation (2015–2019; 2019–2022) and former Governor of Abia State (1992–1993)
- Yemi Osinbajo: Vice President (2015–2023)
- Ahmad Sani Yerima: Senator for Zamfara West (2007–2019) and former Governor of Zamfara State (1999–2007)
- Dave Umahi: Governor of Ebonyi State (2015–present) and former Deputy Governor of Ebonyi State (2011–2015)

==== Withdrew ====
- Mohammed Badaru Abubakar: Governor of Jigawa State (2015–present)
- Godswill Akpabio: former Minister of Niger Delta Affairs (2019–2022), former Senator for Akwa Ibom North-West (2015–2019), and former Governor of Akwa Ibom State (2007–2015)
- Ibikunle Amosun: Senator for Ogun Central (2003–2007; 2019–present) and former Governor of Ogun State (2011–2019)
- Moses Ayom: businessman
- Dimeji Bankole: former House of Representatives member for Abeokuta South (2003–2011) and former Speaker of the House of Representatives (2007–2011)
- Robert Ajayi Boroffice: Senator for Ondo North (2011–present)
- Ibrahim Bello Dauda: businessman
- Kayode Fayemi: Governor of Ekiti State (2010–2014; 2018–present) and former Minister of Solid Mineral Development (2015–2018)
- Nicholas Felix: pastor
- Adamu Garba II: businessman (defected before the primary to the YPP to unsuccessfully run in its presidential primary)
- Godwin Emefiele: Governor of the Central Bank of Nigeria (2014–present)
- Orji Uzor Kalu: Senator for Abia North (2019–present) and former Governor of Abia State (1999–2007) (to run for re-election as senator for Abia North)
- Chris Ngige: Minister of Labour and Employment (2015–2019; 2019–present), former Senator for Anambra Central (2011–2015), and former Governor of Anambra State (2003–2006)
- Ken Nnamani: former Senator for Enugu East (2003–2007) and former President of the Senate (2005–2007)
- Uju Kennedy-Ohanenye: lawyer
- Gbenga Olawepo-Hashim: activist and businessman
- Adams Oshiomhole: former Governor of Edo State (2008–2016) (to run for senator for Edo North)
- Timipre Sylva: Minister of State for Petroleum Resources (2019–present) and former Governor of Bayelsa State (2007–2008; 2008–2012)

==== Declined ====
- Rauf Aregbesola: Minister of the Interior (2019–present) and former Governor of Osun State (2010–2018)
- Yakubu Dogara: House of Representatives member for Dass/Bogoro/Tafawa Balewa (2007–present) and former Speaker of the House of Representatives (2015–2019)
- Nasir Ahmad el-Rufai: Governor of Kaduna State (2015–present) and former Minister of the Federal Capital Territory (2003–2007)
- Shina Peller: House of Representatives member for Iseyin/Kajola/Iwajowa/Itesiwaju (2019–present)
- Ali Modu Sheriff: Governor of Borno State (2003–2011) and former Senator for Borno Central (1999–2003)
- Babagana Umara Zulum: Governor of Borno State (2019–present)

==== Primary results ====
Candidates' vote share
1. Bola Tinubu (60.5%)
2. Rotimi Amaechi (15.0%)
3. Yemi Osinbajo (11.2%)
4. Ahmad Lawan (7.23%)
5. Other candidates (6.09%)

APC primary results
Party	Candidate	Votes	%
APC	Bola Tinubu	1,271	60.47%
APC	Rotimi Amaechi	316	15.03%
APC	Yemi Osinbajo	235	11.18%
APC	Ahmad Lawan	152	7.23%
APC	Yahaya Bello	47	2.24%
APC	Dave Umahi	38	1.81%
APC	Benedict Ayade	37	1.76%
APC	Ahmad Sani Yerima	4	0.19%
APC	Ogbonnaya Onu	1	0.05%
APC	Chukwuemeka Nwajiuba	1	0.05%
APC	Tunde Bakare	0	0.00%
APC	Tein Jack-Rich	0	0.00%
APC	Ikeobasi Mokelu	0	0.00%
APC	Rochas Okorocha	0	0.00%
Total votes		2,102	100.00%
Invalid or blank votes		13	N/A
Turnout		2,322	91.09%

=== Peoples Democratic Party ===
2022 Peoples Democratic Party presidential primary
- 28 May 2022
- Turnout: 98.43%
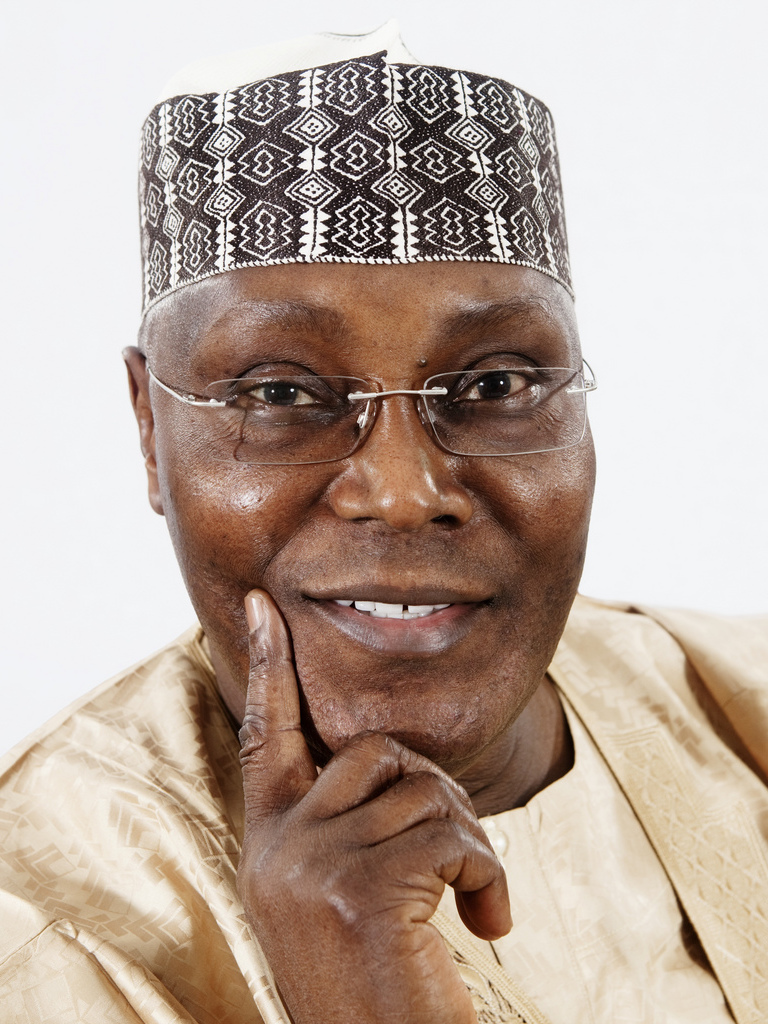

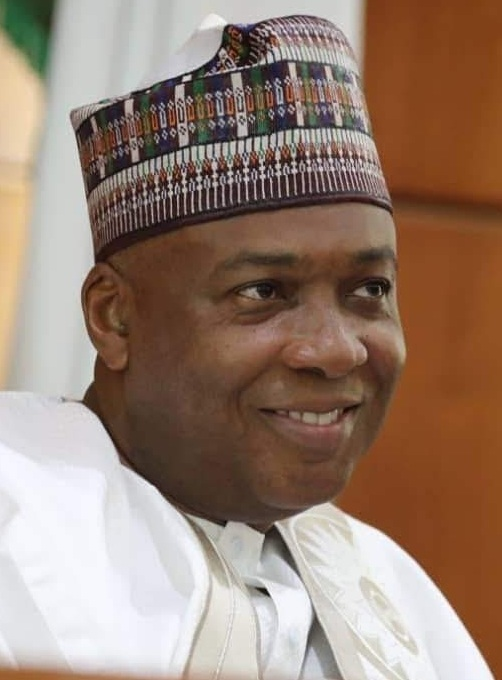
		Wike
Nominee	Atiku Abubakar	Nyesom Wike	Bukola Saraki
Party	PDP	PDP	PDP
Home state	Adamawa	Rivers	Kwara
Popular vote	371	237	70
Percentage	49.3%	31.5%	9.3%
Elected Presidential Nominee
Atiku Abubakar
PDP

In October 2021, newly elected PDP chairman Iyorchia Ayu backed the indirect primary method of nominating a presidential candidate instead of the direct or consensus methods. In the year prior to Ayu's election at the October 2021 PDP National Convention, the party had been beset by months of defections from prominent members, most notably of over a dozen National Assembly members and three governors—Ebonyi State's Dave Umahi, Cross River State's Benedict Ayade, and Zamfara State's Bello Muhammad Matawalle; the party also came a distant second in the 2021 Anambra State gubernatorial election and suspended then-national party chair, Uche Secondus. However, the PDP was able to hold its convention without controversy or violence in October, electing nearly all party officials by consensus and inaugurating the full National Working Committee in December.

In terms of zoning, the PDP did not have a formal zoning agreement for the nomination, however, there were calls from certain politicians and interest groups such as the Southern Governors' Forum to zone the nomination to the South as the APC's Buhari, a Northerner, was elected twice. Amid calls for zoning, the party set up an internal committee in March 2022 with a decision on the issue expected by April. However, the decision's release was delayed until May when the party announced that it would not zone its nomination.

On 16 March 2022, the national PDP announced its primary schedule, setting its expression of interest form price at ₦5 million and the nomination form price at ₦35 million with a 50% discount for candidates between 25 and 30. Forms were to be sold from 18 March to 1 April but the party later extended the deadline four times before reaching a final deadline of 22 April. After the submission of nomination forms by 25 April, candidates were screened by a party committee on 29 April while 2 May was the rescheduled date for the screening appeal process. Ward congresses were set for 29 April and LGA congresses were rescheduled for 10 May to elect "ad hoc delegates" for the primary; ex officio "statutory delegates"—thousands of current and former officeholders—will not be electors unlike previous primaries. Candidates approved by the screening process will advance to a primary set for 28 and 29 May.

At the party screening, a committee led by former Senate President David Mark cleared most candidates but disqualified two—Nwachukwu Anakwenze and Cosmos Chukwudi Ndukwe; The disqualifications were then upheld by a screening appeal committee led by Ayu. After the screening, the party's oft-postponed zoning decision was announced with the PDP National Executive Council choosing not to zone the nomination to any particular region, throwing the race open to all candidates. Of the candidates, analysts viewed five as the most likely to win: Atiku Abubakar—former Vice President and 2019 presidential nominee, Peter Obi—former Governor of Anambra State and 2019 vice presidential nominee, Bukola Saraki—former Senate President, Aminu Waziri Tambuwal—Governor of Sokoto State and former Speaker of the House of Representatives, and Nyesom Wike—Governor of Rivers State with a few other notable candidates seen as unlikely to have a chance. However, a few days before the primary, Obi suddenly withdrew from the primary and decamped to the Labour Party.

In the days before the primary, controversy over the prospective electors emerged due to the legal ramifications of the amended Electoral Act. After years of debate and public pressure, Buhari signed a new Electoral Act in January 2022 that drastically reformed election and electoral systems for both primary and general elections. One of the reforms was the exclusion of ex officio "statutory delegates"—thousands of current and former officeholders—from voting in party primaries; National Assembly leadership said the exclusion was inadvertent and in May, NASS passed an amendment to the act to allow statutory delegates to vote in primaries. However, Buhari refused to sign the amendment into law, forcing the PDP to suddenly barr statutory delegates from voting. Not only did the action prevent incumbent governors and other high-ranking officeholders from voting, it drastically reduced the number of delegates to just 810 then 774.

On the day of the primary, delegates gathered in the Velodrome of the Moshood Abiola National Stadium to be accredited and vote. Despite a few unexpected events, including the arrival of Economic and Financial Crimes Commission personnel meant to prevent bribery and the withdrawal of candidate Mohammed Hayatu-Deen in protest of the "obscenely monetized" race, the process continued as every candidate gave a final speech to the delegates before voting. Another surprise came after the speeches, when Tambuwal returned to the dais to withdraw from the primary and direct his delegates to vote for Abubakar. After the withdrawal, voting began and after over an hour of voting, the votes were publicly tabulated. When collation completed, Atiku Abubakar emerged as nominee after results showed him winning just under 50% of the votes with a margin of 18% over runner-up Wike. Later investigations into reported vote breakdowns stated that Abubakar won the majority of delegates from the North West and North East while delegates from the North Central and South West split Abubakar, Saraki, and Wike; delegates from the South East and South South also split, mainly between Abubakar and Wike but with Emmanuel winning a portion of the votes. In his acceptance speech, Abubakar vowed to carry the party to victory in the general election on a platform based on unity and economic growth while striking a conciliatory tone in regards to his former opponents. Post-primary analysis noted multiple potential reasons for Abubakar's victory, namely: Tambuwal's withdrawal, Abubakar's public office and campaign experience, the higher number of Northern delegates, and bribery. The weeks after the primary were dominated by the search for Abubakar's running mate, as Abubakar is a northern Muslim it was expected that his running mate would be a southern Christian with Wike, Emmanuel, and Governor of Delta State Ifeanyi Okowa being shortlisted as potential options. On 16 June, Abubakar announced that Okowa would be his running mate; observers noted that despite Okowa's South South origins, his Ika ethnicity could be a nod to southeastern clamours for an Igbo running mate. (Note: Okowa is ethnically Ika, a group alternatively classified as either a distinct ethnic group or an Igbo subgroup; Okowa has steadfastly adhered to the latter interpretation, referring to himself as "Igbo." For his part, Wike is ethnically Ikwerre—another group classified as either a distinct ethnic group or an Igbo subgroup—however, Wike follows the former definition and has long denied being Igbo.) In the announcement speech, Abubakar said that he consulted party leadership in the search for his running mate and that Okowa was chosen due to his extensive experience and personal qualities.

==== Nominated ====
- Atiku Abubakar: former Vice President (1999–2007)
  - Running mate—Ifeanyi Okowa: Governor of Delta State (2015–present) and former Senator for Delta North (2011–2015)

==== Eliminated in primary ====
- Anyim Pius Anyim: former Secretary to the Government of the Federation (2011–2015), former President of the Senate (2000–2003), and former Senator for Ebonyi South (1999–2003)
- Udom Gabriel Emmanuel: Governor of Akwa Ibom State (2015–present)
- Ayo Fayose: former Governor of Ekiti State (2003–2006; 2014–2018)
- Chikwendu Kalu: former Speaker of the Abia State House of Assembly
- Bala Mohammed: Governor of Bauchi State (2019–present), former Minister of the Federal Capital Territory (2010–2015), and former Senator for Bauchi South (2007–2010)
- Dele Momodu: journalist, publisher, and businessman
- Sam Ohuabunwa: pharmacist, former president of the Pharmaceutical Society of Nigeria, and brother of former Senator for Abia North Mao Ohuabunwa
- Bukola Saraki: former Senator for Kwara Central (2011–2019), former President of the Senate (2015–2019), and former Governor of Kwara State (2003–2011)
- Diana Oliver Tariela
- Charles Ugwu: real estate developer
- Ezenwo Nyesom Wike: Governor of Rivers State (2015–present) and former Minister of State for Education (2011–2014)

==== Disqualified by screening committee ====
- Nwachukwu Anakwenze: medical doctor
- Cosmos Chukwudi Ndukwe: former Abia State Executive Council official

==== Withdrew ====
- Mohammed Hayatu-Deen: banker and economist
- Peter Obi: former Governor of Anambra State (2006; 2007; 2007–2014) (defected before the primary to the LP to run in its presidential primary)
- Doyin Okupe: physician and former aide to presidents Obasanjo and Jonathan (defected before the primary to the LP)
- Aminu Waziri Tambuwal: Governor of Sokoto State (2015–present), former Speaker of the House of Representatives (2011–2015), and former House of Representatives member for Kebbe/Tambuwal (2003–2015)

==== Declined ====
- Ibrahim Hassan Dankwambo: former Governor of Gombe State (2011–2019)
- Goodluck Jonathan: former President (2010–2015), former Vice President (2007–2010), and former Governor of Bayelsa State (2005–2007)
- Sule Lamido: former Governor of Jigawa State (2007–2015) and former Minister of Foreign Affairs (1999–2003)
- Ahmed Makarfi: former Senator for Kaduna North (2007–2011) and former Governor of Kaduna State (1999–2007)
- Seyi Makinde: Governor of Oyo State (2019–present)
- Sulaiman Mohammed Nazif: former Senator for Bauchi North (2015–2019)
- Ibrahim Shema: former Governor of Katsina State (2007–2015)
- Kabiru Tanimu Turaki: former Minister of Special Duties and Intergovernmental Affairs (2013–2015) and former Supervising Minister of Labour and Productivity (2014–2015)

==== Primary results ====
Candidates' vote share
1. Atiku Abubakar (49.3%)
2. Nyesom Wike (31.5%)
3. Bukola Saraki (9.31%)
4. Udom Gabriel Emmanuel (5.05%)
5. Other candidates (4.78%)

PDP primary results
Party	Candidate	Votes	%
PDP	Atiku Abubakar	371	49.34%
PDP	Nyesom Wike	237	31.52%
PDP	Bukola Saraki	70	9.31%
PDP	Udom Gabriel Emmanuel	38	5.05%
PDP	Bala Mohammed	20	2.66%
PDP	Anyim Pius Anyim	14	1.86%
PDP	Sam Ohuabunwa	1	0.13%
PDP	Diana Oliver Tariela	1	0.13%
PDP	Ayo Fayose	0	0.00%
PDP	Chikwendu Kalu	0	0.00%
PDP	Dele Momodu	0	0.00%
PDP	Charles Ugwu	0	0.00%
Total votes		752	100.00%
Invalid or blank votes		12	N/A
Turnout		764	98.43%

=== Minor parties ===
Accord

Accord first scheduled its primary for 2 June before shifting it to 4 June. That day the party nominated entrepreneur, Christopher Imumolen, as its presidential nominee. The nomination was determined by voice vote after all other candidates stepped down. On 25 August, Bello Bala Maru—a former Zamfara State cabinet official—was named as Imumolen's running mate.

Accord primary results
Party	Candidate	Votes	%
A	Christopher Imumolen	Voice vote	100.00%
Total votes		N/A	100.00%
Turnout		N/A	100.00%

Action Alliance
Candidates' vote share
1. Hamza al-Mustapha (70.1%)
2. Samson Odupitan (29.9%)

The Action Alliance initially scheduled its primary for 3 June 2022 but moved it to 9 June with forms being sold from 4 April to 15 May. The expression of interest form price was set at ₦5 million and the nomination form price at ₦10 million with a 50% discount for women, youth, and candidates with disabilities.

On the primary date, two candidates (Tunde Kelani and Felix Johnson Osakwe) withdrew while the other two candidates continued to an indirect primary in Abuja that ended with Hamza al-Mustapha—former military dictator Sani Abacha's former security officer and close aide—emerging as the party nominee after results showed al-Mustapha winning over 70% of the delegates' votes. In his acceptance speech, al-Mustapha called for national and party unity before his sole opponent, Samson Odupitan, pledged to support al-Mustapha in the general election. Chukwuka Johnson was nominated as the party's vice presidential nominee.

AA primary results
Party	Candidate	Votes	%
AA	Hamza al-Mustapha	506	70.08%
AA	Samson Odupitan	216	29.92%
Total votes		722	100.00%
Turnout		854	100.00%

Action Democratic Party

The Action Democratic Party scheduled its primary for 31 May where the party nominated its national chairman, Yabagi Sani, as its presidential nominee. The nomination was determined using the consensus method which ended in Sani's emergence as nominee. Sani thanked the party in his acceptance speech, noting that the consensus method was beneficial and promising to adhere to party members as their nominee. On 23 June, Udo Okey-Okoro was announced as Sani's running mate.

ADP primary results
Party	Candidate	Votes	%
ADP	Yabagi Sani	Consensus	100.00%
Total votes		N/A	100.00%
Turnout		N/A	100.00%

Action Peoples Party

The Action Peoples Party nominated Osita Nnadi and Isa Hamisu as the party's presidential and vice presidential nominees, respectively.

African Action Congress

The years prior to the AAC primary were beset by a party crisis as two groups both claimed to be the legitimate party organization, one faction led by Leonard Nzenwa and the other faction led by party founder Omoyele Sowore. Both politicians claimed to be party chairman with INEC initially recognizing Nzenwa until Sowore was confirmed to be the rightful chair in early June 2022.

The African Action Congress initially scheduled its primary for 1 to 3 June before moving it to 9 June with candidates registering to contest between 6 and 9 May. The party waived fees for both its expression of interest and nomination forms with candidates only having to pay ₦500,000 "obligatory donation" fees with a 25% discount for women and no fees for candidates with disabilities, students, honorably discharged security personnel, teachers, nurses, and emergency service workers.

On the primary date, Sowore was the sole candidate but first resigned as party chairman before the primary in accordance with the party constitution. He then won the nomination by acclamation. At the end of the month, Haruna Garba Magashi—a lawyer from Kano State—was unveiled as the vice presidential nominee in Abuja.

AAC primary results
Party	Candidate	Votes	%
AAC	Omoyele Sowore	Consensus	100.00%
Total votes		N/A	100.00%
Turnout		N/A	100.00%

African Democratic Congress

During the 2019 elections, the ADC solidified its place as one of the larger minor parties by becoming the fourth largest party in the House of Representatives and taking a distant fourth in the presidential race. However, the party faced difficulty as the majority of its legislators decamped to different parties during their terms.

The African Democratic Congress initially scheduled its primary for 1 June but rescheduled it for 8 June with forms being sold from 24 March to 24 May. The expression of interest form price was set at ₦5 million and the nomination form price at ₦20 million with forms being free for women, youth, and candidates with disabilities.

Candidates' vote share
1. Dumebi Kachikwu 49.29 (47.6%)
2. Kingsley Moghalu 29.69 (28.7%)
3. Chukwuka Monye 17.09 (16.5%)
4. Other candidates 7.51 (7.25%)

Ahead of the primary in Abeokuta, it was noted that the ADC had a high number of aspirants compared to other smaller parties with analysts viewing two as the major contenders: Dumebi Kachikwu—Roots Television Nigeria founder and brother of former minister Ibe Kachikwu along with Kingsley Moghalu—a former Central Bank official. On the primary date, the candidates contested an indirect primary that ended with Kachikwu emerging as the presidential nominee after results showed him winning just under 50% of the delegates' votes. A few days later, Moghalu left the party in protest amid allegations that Kachikwu's win was mainly due to bribes given to delegates. Kachikwu denied the allegations and claimed that it was Moghalu that attempted bribery; however, a few days later, American assets of Kachikwu were seized and a previous seizure related to the William J. Jefferson corruption case resurfaced leading to questions on his credibility. The party first nominated Ahmed Mani for the vice presidency as a placeholder before picking Malika Sani later in June; however, Sani's nomination fell through and about a month later, Kachikwu announced Ahmed Buhari—an oil and gas consultant from Niger State—as his substantive running mate. Soon afterward, the party descended into crisis as factions attempted to expel Kachikwu.

ADC primary results
Party	Candidate	Votes	%
ADC	Dumebi Kachikwu	978	49.29%
ADC	Kingsley Moghalu	589	29.69%
ADC	Chukwuka Monye	339	17.09%
ADC	Chichi Ojei	72	3.63%
ADC	Ebiti Ndok-Jegede	5	0.25%
ADC	Angela Johnson	1	0.05%
Total votes		1,984	100.00%
Turnout		2,100	100.00%

Allied Peoples Movement

The Allied Peoples Movement initially scheduled its primary for 30 May but rescheduled it for 9 June. Party chairman Yusuf Mamman Dantalle was the sole candidate and won the nomination unopposed at the party secretariat. Princess Chichi Ojei was then nominated as the party's vice presidential nominee. However, Dantalle withdrew from the nomination in July and Ojei was nominated in his place. She later picked Ibrahim Mohammed as running mate.

All Progressives Grand Alliance

In 2021 and 2022, APGA retained the Anambra State governorship by a substantial margin and gained a senator through defection, cementing its place as the nation's third largest party. However, the party rarely expands out from its southeastern base and has not obtained over a percent of the vote in any presidential election since 2003.

The All Progressives Grand Alliance scheduled its primary for 1 June 2022 with ward congresses set for 10 May to elect delegates for the primary. The expression of interest form price was set at ₦5 million and the nomination form price at ₦20 million with a 50% discount for women and candidates with disabilities; forms were to be sold from 29 March to 11 April but the deadline was extended to 15 April.

On primary day, Peter Umeadi—former Chief Judge of Anambra State—was the sole presidential candidate and was nominated by voice vote. Abdullahi Muhammed Koli, a labour union activist from Bauchi State, was announced as Umeadi's vice presidential running mate on 12 June.

APGA primary results
Party	Candidate	Votes	%
APGA	Peter Umeadi	Voice vote	100.00%
Total votes		150	100.00%
Turnout		150	100.00%

Boot Party

The Boot Party nominated Sunday Adenuga and Mustapha Usman Turaki as the party's presidential and vice presidential nominee, respectively.

Labour Party

In 2021, a number of politicians and activists led by Patrick Utomi, Attahiru Jega, and Femi Falana announced an effort to find a party to lead a "Third Force" alliance in an attempt to unseat the APC and the PDP. After a number of delays, in May 2022, the group adopted the Labour Party as its platform with hopes of forming an alliance with a number of other smaller parties. The party received another boost when former Governor of Anambra State Peter Obi joined the party in May 2022 to continue his presidential campaign after leaving the PDP. Obi was welcomed into the party by its leadership which also used the announcement to attack the APC and PDP as well as commit to the party manifesto. However, the party had to contend with deep divisions as a factional crisis from 2018 is still in the courts.

The Labour Party initially scheduled its primary for 3 June but rescheduled it for 30 May. It set the price for expression of interest and nomination forms at ₦30 million. On the day of the primary, 104 delegates gathered in Asaba for the primary but no election was needed as three of four candidates—Utomi, Olubusola Emmanuel-Tella, and Joseph Faduri—withdrew in favour of Obi. Obi then won the primary unanimously with only a sole invalid vote not going for him. In his acceptance speech, he promised to revolutionize the nation economically and mobilize an effective general election campaign. A few days after the primary, the other Labour faction held its own parallel primary but INEC recognized the Obi-won election. On 17 June, the party submitted the name of Doyin Okupe—a physician and former PDP candidate who became the Director-General of the Obi Campaign Organisation—as a placeholder vice presidential nominee to be substituted for someone else at a later date. On 7 July, Okupe formally withdrew ahead of the announcement of Obi's substantive running mate. The next day, Yusuf Datti Baba-Ahmed—a businessman who previously served as Senator for Kaduna North—was announced as the party's vice presidential nominee. Analysts noted the regional balance of the ticket as Baba-Ahmed is a northerner but questioned his electoral experience as he has not won an election since 2011; at the same time, pundits said his prominent Zaria-based family and technocratic image could help Obi. Peter Obi's running mate, Yusuf Datti Baba-Ahmed, in November 2011, called for LGBTQ within the society to be killed, whilst debating the levity of punishment contained in the proposed bill to criminalise such relationships, in a Senate session

LP primary results
Party	Candidate	Votes	%
LP	Peter Obi	96	100.00%
Total votes		96	100.00%
Invalid or blank votes		1	N/A
Turnout		97	93.27%

National Rescue Movement

The National Rescue Movement scheduled its primary for 1 and 2 June; setting its expression of interest form price at ₦1.5 million and nomination form price at ₦17.5 million with a 50% discount for women, youth, and candidates with disabilities. At the primary, Okwudili Nwa-Anyajike—a businessman—defeated seven other candidates to win the nomination by a margin of over 60% of the vote. However, when INEC released its provisional nominee list, Nwa-Anyajike had been substituted for Felix Johnson Osakwe—a withdrawn AA presidential candidate; Nwa-Anyajike and other party members allege that Osakwe colluded with a portion of NRM leadership to forge Nwa-Anyajike's withdrawal and substitute Osakwe as the nominee. When the INEC final nominee list was released in September, Osakwe's name remained as the party presidential nominee with Yahaya Muhammad Kyabo as vice presidential nominee.

Candidates' vote share
1. Okwudili Nwa-Anyajike (78.3%)
2. Benedicta Egbo (14.8%)
3. Other candidates (6.96%)

NRM primary results
Party	Candidate	Votes	%
NRM	Okwudili Nwa-Anyajike	180	78.26%
NRM	Benedicta Egbo	34	14.78%
NRM	Ibrahim Yunusa	10	4.35%
NRM	Vincent Anthony Ubani	2	0.87%
NRM	Sam Emiaso	1	0.43%
NRM	Barry Avotu Johnson (withdrawn)	1	0.43%
NRM	Emeka Mandela Ukaegbu	1	0.43%
NRM	Solomon Uchenna Winning	1	0.43%
NRM	Francis Ikechukwu Igbo (withdrawn)	0	0.00%
Total votes		230	100.00%
Invalid or blank votes		10	N/A
Turnout		240	100.00%

New Nigeria Peoples Party

In early 2022, former Governor of Kano State Rabiu Musa Kwankwaso and many of his allies defected from the PDP to join the NNPP. Within a few weeks, a number of other politicians (mainly from the North, especially Kano State) joined the party and Kwankwaso was named national leader of the party in preparation for his presidential campaign.

The New Nigeria Peoples Party initially scheduled its primary for 1 and 2 June 2022 before pushing it back to 8 June. To elect delegates for the primary, ward and local government congresses were set for 22 and 25 April, respectively. The expression of interest form price was set at ₦10 million and the nomination form price at ₦20 million with those forms being sold from 10 to 15 April.

Ahead of the primary, the party attempted to woo Peter Obi to be Kwankwaso's running mate but he instead went to the Labour Party; as an alternative, presidential candidate Olufemi Ajadi stepped down and agreed to be Kwankwaso's running mate. Ajadi's withdrawal left Kwankwaso unopposed in the primary. On 8 June, Kwankwaso won the nomination by voice vote at the primary in Velodrome of the Moshood Abiola National Stadium. The party would later nominate Ladipo Johnson instead of Ajadi as a placeholder vice presidential nominee while negotiations with the Labour Party resumed. After the negotiations failed, Isaac Idahosa—a Lagos-based pastor originally from Edo State—was named as the substantive vice presidential nominee on 14 July.

NNPP primary results
Party	Candidate	Votes	%
New Nigeria Peoples Party	Rabiu Musa Kwankwaso	Voice vote	100.00%
Total votes		N/A	100.00%
Turnout		774	100.00%

People's Redemption Party
Candidates' vote share
1. Kola Abiola (59.9%)
2. Usman Bugaje (23.2%)
3. Patience Key (9.39%)
4. Gboluga Mosugu (7.51%)

The People's Redemption Party first scheduled its primary for 28 May but moved it to 4 and 5 June; setting its expression of interest form price at ₦500,000 and its nomination form price at ₦10 million with a 50% discount for women candidates and free nomination forms for candidates with disabilities. In the primary, Kola Abiola—businessman and the son of former president-elect M. K. O. Abiola—defeated three other candidates to win the nomination by a margin of over 37% of the vote. Unlike other parties' presidential primaries, the PRP had delegates vote from their state events instead of holding one central primary. In the weeks after the primary, Ribi Marshal was nominated as the party's vice presidential nominee; he was replaced by Haro Haruna Zego in the final INEC nominee list.

PRP primary results
Party	Candidate	Votes	%
PRP	Kola Abiola	2,097	59.88%
PRP	Usman Bugaje	813	23.22%
PRP	Patience Key	329	9.39%
PRP	Gboluga Mosugu	263	7.51%
Total votes		3,502	100.00%
Invalid or blank votes		158	N/A
Turnout		3,660	100.00%

Social Democratic Party

The Social Democratic Party initially scheduled its primary for 28 to 30 May 2022 but one faction instead scheduled its primary for 8 June while another faction held its primary on 31 May. Ward/LGA and state congresses were set for 19 and 20 May, respectively, to elect delegates for the primary. The party set its expression of interest form price at ₦3 million and its nomination form price at ₦32 million with a 50% discount for youth and free forms for women and candidates with disabilities.

The months prior to the SDP primary were beset by a party crisis as two groups both claimed to be the legitimate party organization. On 31 May, the Supo Shonibare-led faction held its primary and nominated Ebenezer Ikeyina—former Senator for Anambra Central—unopposed. On 8 June, the Olu Agunloye-led faction held its primary at the Abuja International Conference Centre and nominated Adewole Adebayo—a lawyer and media mogul—by a wide margin over his sole opponent, Khadijah Okunnu-Lamidi. Adebayo's nomination was recognized by INEC as he and his vice presidential running mate—Yusuf Buhari—were placed on the final nominee list.

~~SDP (Shonibare faction) invalid primary results~~
Party	Candidate	Votes	%
SDP	~~Ebenezer Ikeyina~~	~~308~~	~~99.35%~~
SDP	~~Against Ebenezer Ikeyina~~	~~2~~	~~0.65%~~
Total votes		~~310~~	~~100.00%~~
Invalid or blank votes		~~1~~	N/A
Turnout		~~311~~	~~100.00%~~

SDP (Agunloye faction) primary results
Party	Candidate	Votes	%
SDP	Adewole Adebayo	1,546	94.90%
SDP	Khadijah Okunnu-Lamidi	83	5.10%
Total votes		1,629	100.00%
Invalid or blank votes		44	N/A
Turnout		1,673	97.84%

Young Progressives Party

The Young Progressives Party initially scheduled its primary for 1 June before moving it to 8 June. It was won by Malik Ado-Ibrahim, the founder of the Reset Nigeria Initiative and son of Ohinoyi of Ebiraland Abdul Rahman Ado Ibrahim, by a large margin over Ruby Isaac. In his acceptance speech, Ado-Ibrahim vowed to unify Nigerians and provide basic services. Kasarachi Enyinna was nominated as the party's vice presidential nominee.

YPP primary results
Party	Candidate	Votes	%
YPP	Malik Ado-Ibrahim	66	94.29%
YPP	Ruby Isaac	4	5.71%
Total votes		70	100.00%
Turnout		70	94.59%

Zenith Labour Party (Note: The party was renamed the "Zenith Progressives Alliance" on 8 June 2022.)

The then-Zenith Labour Party initially scheduled its primary for 1 June before moving it to 8 June; setting its expression of interest form price at ₦5 million and the nomination form price at ₦18 million with free forms for women, youth, and candidates with disabilities. At the primary, Dan Nwanyanwu—the party national chairman—won the nomination on the same day that the party name was changed to the Zenith Progressives Alliance. Ramalan Abubakar was nominated as the party's vice presidential nominee.

== Conduct ==
=== Electoral timetable ===
On 26 February 2022, the Independent National Electoral Commission released a timetable, setting out key dates and deadlines for the election. Months later on 27 May 2022, INEC made a slight revision to the timetable, allowing parties extra time to conduct primaries.

- 28 February 2022 – Publication of Notice of Election
- 4 April 2022 – First day for the conduct of party primaries
- 9 June 2022 (Note: The original deadline was 3 June; however, INEC pushed it back to 9 June at the behest of parties.) – Final day for the conduct of party primaries, including the resolution of disputes arising from them
- 10 June 2022 – First day for submission of nomination forms to INEC via the online portal
- 17 June 2022 – Final day for submission of nomination forms to INEC via the online portal
- 28 September 2022 – Commencement of the official campaign period
- 23 February 2023 – Final day of the official campaign period
- 25 February 2023 – Election day

=== Recognized parties and nominees ===
After the 2019 elections, INEC deregistered 74 political parties for failing to "satisfy the requirements" of continued registration based on their performances during the elections. The move, which was unsuccessfully challenged in court several times from 2019 to 2022, left the nation with 18 political parties: Accord, the Action Alliance, the Action Democratic Party, the Action Peoples Party, the African Action Congress, the African Democratic Congress, the Allied Peoples Movement, the All Progressives Congress, the All Progressives Grand Alliance, the Boot Party, the Labour Party, the New Nigeria Peoples Party, the National Rescue Movement, the Peoples Democratic Party, the People's Redemption Party, the Social Democratic Party, the Young Progressives Party, and the Zenith Progressives Alliance. In March 2022, INEC announced that no new parties would be registered before the 2023 elections.

Parties were required to submit their presidential and vice presidential nominees between 10 and 17 June 2022. On 25 June, INEC released the provisional list of most recognized presidential and vice presidential nominees. The final list was released on 20 September.

2023 Presidential nominees
Party	Ticket	
Party	Presidential nominee	Vice Presidential nominee
Accord	Christopher Imumolen	Bello Bala Maru
Action Alliance	Hamza al-Mustapha	Chukwuka Johnson
Action Democratic Party	Yabagi Sani	Udo Okey-Okoro
Action Peoples Party	Osita Nnadi	Isa Hamisu
African Action Congress	Omoyele Sowore	Haruna Garba Magashi
African Democratic Congress	Dumebi Kachikwu	Ahmed Buhari
All Progressives Congress	Bola Tinubu	Kashim Shettima
All Progressives Grand Alliance	Peter Umeadi	Abdullahi Muhammed Koli
Allied Peoples Movement	Princess Chichi Ojei	Ibrahim Mohammed
Boot Party	Sunday Adenuga	Mustapha Usman Turaki
Labour Party	Peter Obi	Yusuf Datti Baba-Ahmed
National Rescue Movement	Felix Johnson Osakwe	Yahaya Muhammad Kyabo
New Nigeria Peoples Party	Rabiu Kwankwaso	Isaac Idahosa
People's Redemption Party	Kola Abiola	Haro Haruna Zego
Peoples Democratic Party	Atiku Abubakar	Ifeanyi Okowa
Social Democratic Party	Adewole Adebayo	Yusuf Buhari
Young Progressives Party	Malik Ado-Ibrahim	Kasarachi Enyinna
Zenith Labour Party	Dan Nwanyanwu	Ramalan Abubakar

=== Election administration ===
==== Primary and post-primary period ====
Party primaries are administered by the parties themselves but must be monitored by Independent National Electoral Commission observers and fall inside the scheduled primary period set by INEC. The commission released the timetable in February 2022 with a final date of 3 June 2022 for party primaries; as this date neared, parties repeatedly asked INEC to extend the deadline by two months. After several refusals, INEC agreed to a shorter extension of six days to 9 June but the decision proved controversial as pundits noted that the PDP was about to hold its primary while the APC had not even screened its candidates. Further criticism arose because INEC initially did not also extend the voter registration deadline in kind.

After the primaries, focus shifted to voter registration and the logistical issues surrounding it. Due to years of IPOB attacks on southeastern INEC offices, the commission's capacity in the region was low in 2022 while in Lagos, a registration drive by market traders in June 2022 that overwhelmed an INEC centre also drew the commission's registration capability into question as the deadline neared. In the wake of the incidents, INEC deployed extra registration machines to Lagos State, Kano State, and some southeastern states. Around the same time, INEC hinted at a potential extension of the registration deadline before a court ruling later in June pushed back the deadline anyway. In compliance with the ruling, INEC set the new deadline for 31 July while simultaneously extending daily registration hours from six to eight. Ahead of the deadline, eleven states declared public holidays for voter registration in an attempt to increase public participation in the political process. After the deadline passed, INEC announced that nearly 12.3 million new voters registered during the exercise. 8.75 million of the new voters were younger than 34, a percentage noted as a potential sign of increased youth participation ahead of the election. After the registration drive, the total registered voters number was about 96.2 million with the North-West and South-West geopolitical zones having the most voters.

As the official campaign period neared, INEC focused on direct public communication and formed the Election Crisis Communication Team in late August. During the team inauguration, commissioner Festus Okoye stated that the group's formation was initiated by the Centre for Democracy and Development to combat misinformation and inform the public on key events to the public; Okoye also said that the commission was in the process of training staff to work polling units. Focus shifted back to registration afterwards, with INEC delisting over 1.1 million invalid registrants in mid-September. Among the final pre-campaign period procedures was the 20 September release of the nominee list along with the reiteration of the timetable.

==== Campaign period ====
The official campaign period began on 28 September 2022 and will end on 23 February 2023. At the start of the campaign period, reports noted the pressure placed on INEC from voters, misinformation, and political parties.

In late October, the commission again announced mass delisting of invalid registrants with 2.78 million enrollees (including the prior 1.1 million invalid registrants) being removed from the list due to double registration, underaged registration, and other issues. At the same event, INEC chairman Mahmood Yakubu also revealed that the preliminary total valid registrant number was about 93.52 million. In accordance with law, INEC posted registries in each local ward but also released the full registrant list online, asking for the public to help scrutinize the list. Amid the public clamor to inspect the list, thousands of public reports showed clearly underage children as registrants—in response, INEC thanked public investigators then vowed to remove ineligible registrants and prosecute complicit officials.

As campaigning escalated in late 2022, fears rose over electoral violence based on ethnic, regional, and religious sentiments as candidates and their surrogates began extensively using identity politics during campaigning. Similarly, fears rose over media campaign and election coverage and its effects on public discourse; while certain outlets were criticized for biases, other groups were praised for advancing election coverage as Stears Business published the first live election tracker in November.

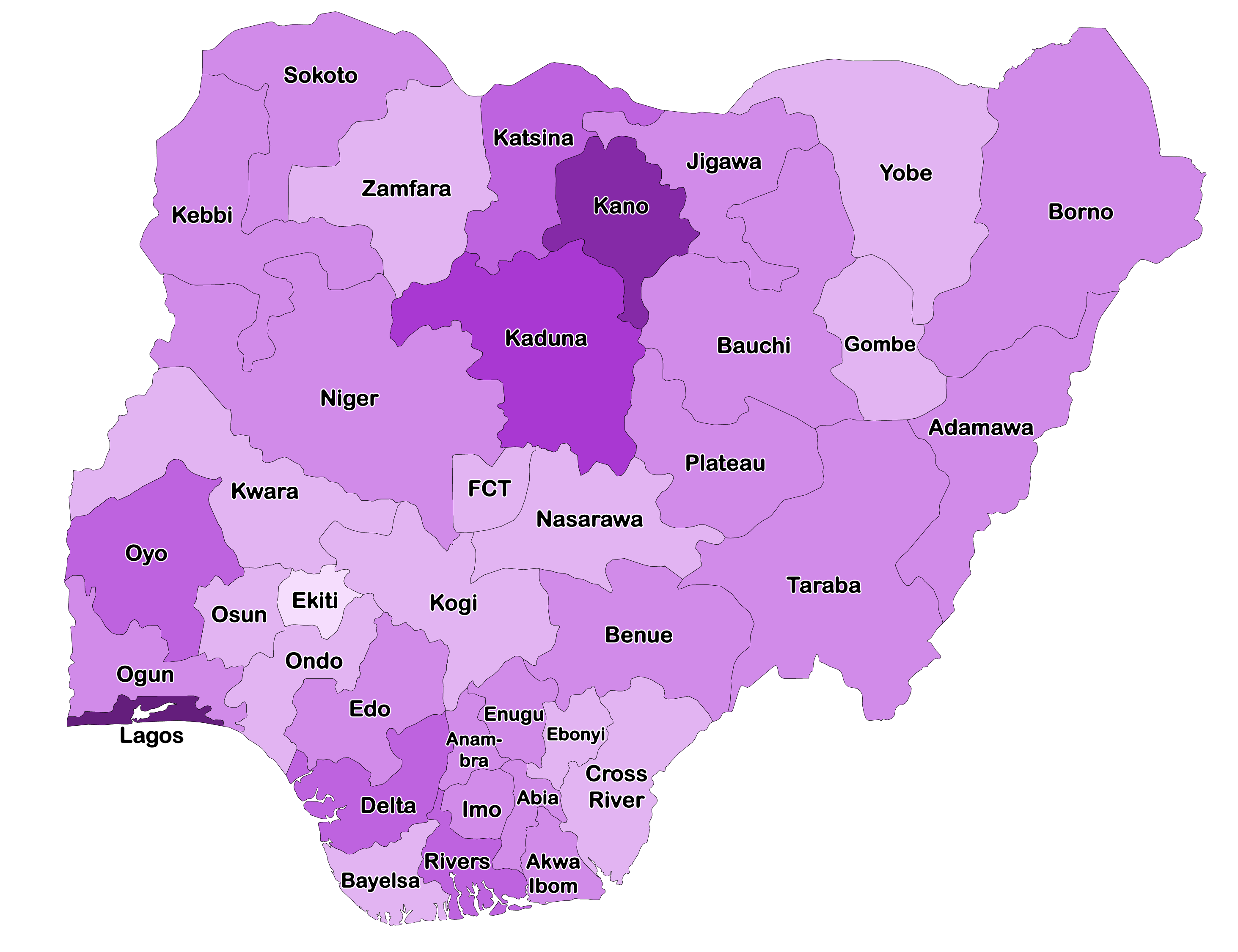
Total registered voters by state as of January 2023: <1 million 1 million–2 million 2 million–3 million 3 million–4 million / 4 million–5 million 5 million–6 million >7 million

In terms of election security, a series of attacks on INEC offices in Imo State in December 2022 led to further domestic and international concern despite assurances from security forces that the election would be nonviolent. In the wake of the attacks, the Centre for Democracy and Development called for conflict sensitive media reporting on the election to avoid further violence. In accompaniment with concern over violence, renewed fear of hate speech (especially online) began as the election neared and politicians increasingly employed it as a campaign tactic.

Aside from direct threats to the elections, INEC also raised the alarm about vote-buying to manipulate results as the practice had greatly impacted elections in 2021 and 2022. In a reported attempt to combat vote-buying, the Central Bank redesigned the 200, 500, and 1,000 naira notes in October 2022 and removed older notes from circulation. The move prevented parties from using pre-gathered cash that was attended to be distributed for vote-buying as the elections neared. However, the new policy and its sudden announcement was very controversial, especially as Central Bank Governor Godwin Emefiele—who fled into self-imposed exile in late 2022—refused to personally explain the move to the National Assembly. For the part of INEC, the commission vowed to prevent vote-buying despite previous failed reforms while civil society groups noted that vote-buying was just one of a number of potential manipulation tactics, with YIAGA Africa releasing a report detailing electoral malpractice risk factors by state.

As sporadic attacks on southeastern INEC offices continued into the new year, a commission official warned that the election could be forced into postponement if the attacks were not stopped. Although the comment was quickly retracted and the commission promised to hold the election as scheduled, concerns continued considering the deadly attacks—like previous southeastern attacks on INEC, experts stated that the attacks were most likely conducted by violent secessionist groups attempting to "delegitimise the electoral process and boost their separatist agenda". The attacks continued until the election, as did concerns that the election would be postponed at the last moment.

Amid swirling doubts over the election proceeding, INEC released new voter registration data in mid-January 2023. The statistics totaled to 93,469,008 eligible voters after the commission reviewed challenges to over 50,000 registrants in addition to removing more instances of double and underage registration. While there was data on occupation and disability plus a sizeable gender gap—over 4.6 million more men registered than women, focus was mainly directed at the increased youth registration with nearly 40% of all voters being between the ages of 18 and 34. Geographic data showed fairly stark contrasts between regions as the North-West and South-West led in total voters while the North East and South East trailed behind. Around the same time, INEC twice extended the deadline for PVC collection in wake of public calls for an extension. A few weeks after the final deadline elapsed, the commission released Permanent Voter Card collection statistics on 23 February that showed a total of 87,209,007 voters (93.3% of all registered voters) had collected their PVCs. In the final days of the campaign period, INEC vowed that the election would be free, safe, secure, timely, and transparent with hundreds of thousands of security personnel, 229 foreign and domestic observer groups, and thousands of INEC staffers.

==== Election day and collation period ====
On election day, widespread reports of delayed starts to voting emerged with YIAGA Africa estimating that only 41% of polling units had commenced voting by 9:30 am, an hour after voting was scheduled to start. Similarly, SBM Intelligence reported that only 41.3% of polling units had opened on time while Nigeria Civil Society Situation Room data claimed less than 30% of units had started by 8:30 am, with other reports claiming that the currency crisis had precluded INEC from paying cash to transporters prior to election day which led some drivers to refuse to convey INEC materials or personnel. SBM also noted that turnout was high and there were relatively few violent incidents nationwide while some groups observed newly adapted vote buying efforts due to the currency crisis like bribing using West African CFA francs or non-monetary inducements. However, there were notable reports of violence in certain areas, most notably in Lagos State where thugs alleged to be aligned with the APC targeted predominantly ethnic minority areas. Additionally, several attacks on journalists by unknown assailants or even security personnel occurred throughout election day. Although INEC chairman Mahmood Yakubu acknowledged several problems at his 1 pm briefing and called on voters to stay at polling units, civil groups called on INEC to extend voting past the 2:30 pm deadline. The first announced postponements came later in the day when INEC suspended voting in 141 Bayelsa State units where there were disruptions, rescheduling the voting for 26 February. INEC later extended voting to the next day in parts of Cross River State and Kogi State as well.

European Union Observation Mission Preliminary Statement

According to the findings of EU EOM observers, election day was marked by late deployment and opening while polling procedures were not always followed. Polling staff struggled to complete result forms, which were not posted publicly in most polling units observed.

— European External Action Service

Later in the day, focus turned to turnout and results collation. On turnout, SBM Intelligence released a state-by-state turnout projection, estimating that overall turnout had risen compared to 2019 and that everywhere but Kwara and Ogun had turnout higher than 30%. Although INEC had announced that collation centres would only open at noon on 26 February, the commission had long promised to upload polling unit results to its INEC result viewing portal (IReV) on election day; however, no results were uploaded for most of the day, leading to protests by the civil society groups and online citizens. The Obi campaign also decried the lack of uploads, claiming the act drew the election's fairness into doubt and noting that legislative results had already been uploaded; Labour Party Chairman Julius Abure went as far to claim that compromised or threatened INEC officials were holding back results from Obi-supporting areas of Lagos and Delta states. Around 10:45 pm on the night of 25 February, INEC finally began uploading data to the portal.

By 6 am on 26 February, only about 10% of polling unit results had been uploaded as journalists noted the rising potential for further doubt in election credibility due to the delay. Later in the morning, voting in rescheduled units commenced while newly released civil society reports commended voters but decried suppression and poor administration. By the opening of the national collation centre around 1 pm, more results had been uploaded but no full state results were communicated at the centre yet. Meanwhile, INEC released a statement that blamed "technical hitches" for the delayed uploads of results in the wake of further protests by both the PDP and LP. By the end of the day, only Ekiti State results were announced at the national centre while the results in Osun and Ondo were announced at the state collation centres but did not reach the national centre before it closed for the day. On the other hand, voting was further postponed in some areas, with significant controversy surrounding the election in Abia State and its INEC administrators.

Nigeria Labour Congress statement

The inability of INEC to prevent the recurrence in this election of the ills of past elections speaks volume of its ill-preparedness for this election as can be demonstrated in the late arrivals of critical election materials to the Polling Units and the almost deliberate tampering of the BVAS in many Polling Units including the outright refusal of its operatives to upload results from the BVAS to the INEC Servers in total violation of the Rule of the election and INEC's own election guidelines.

— Nigeria Labour Congress

On 27 February, criticism of INEC continued with international observers and the Nigeria Labour Congress lambasting the commission's lack of transparency amidst the delays. Similarly, agents of political parties (notably including PDP and LP agents) at the national collation centre protested the prolonged delay in uploading results on iReV, even in states where final results had been announced along with discrepancies in result totals. Meanwhile, final results came in from Adamawa, Enugu, Gombe, Katsina, Kwara, Lagos, Ogun, Oyo, and Yobe by the afternoon. However, the collation centre protests culminated in an agent walkout by the representatives of the LP and PDP alongside multiple other parties' agents.

By the early morning of 28 February, more results were reported from Akwa Ibom, Bauchi, Bayelsa, Benue, Cross River, Delta, the Federal Capital Territory, Jigawa, Kaduna, Kano, Nasarawa, Niger, Plateau, Sokoto, and Zamfara. However, criticism of the process from domestic and international observers continued, with the European Union observer mission noting "lack of transparency and operational failures" that "reduced trust in the process" while other groups echoed similar displeasure. These reports, along with further disputes over the process, led the campaigns of Abubakar, Obi, and Kwankwaso to fully reject the results of the election on 28 February and call for a new election to be conducted.

Regardless of protests, Yakubu continued accepting state-by-state results throughout 28 February and into the early hours of 1 March; in this time, the remaining states reported vote totals: Abia, Anambra, Borno, Ebonyi, Edo, Imo, Kebbi, Kogi, and Taraba in addition to notably including the heavily disputed results from Rivers State. After the state results were reported and accepted by the national collation centre, Yakubu stated "Tinubu Bola Ahmed of the APC, having satisfied the requirements of the law is hereby declared the winner and returned elected" in the early morning of 1 March. All three major opposing campaigns rejected and vowed to challenge the results.

== Campaign ==
=== Issues ===
In the wake of party primaries, several major factors for the upcoming general election campaign were noted, namely: ethnic and religious identity, the role of Buhari and his incumbency power, the economy, corruption, the personal brands of candidates, and public anger with the political status quo. Ahead of the official campaign period, major candidates were to release their policy documents: Abubakar did so in late May but Obi and Tinubu did not unveil their policy documents until after the campaign period commenced in September 2022 with Tinubu releasing his manifesto in mid-October and Obi releasing his manifesto in early December. As the campaign developed, other issues like climate change and sports development rose to prominence. However, civil society reports from January 2023 claimed that the majority of campaigning was not based on policy issues as personality politics, identity politics, and negative campaigning overtook policy discussion.

=== Timeline ===
==== Pre-campaign period ====
- 28 April 2021: The Independent National Electoral Commission (INEC) announces 18 February 2023 as the election day.
- 10 November 2021: APGA nominee Charles Chukwuma Soludo is declared winner of the off-cycle Anambra State gubernatorial election that took place on 6 November; the PDP and APC nominees come distant second and third places, respectively.
- 28 January 2022: Then-aspirant Bola Tinubu goes to London, reportedly on a medical trip; the trip comes just a few months after Tinubu returned from a three-month medical stay in the United Kingdom.
- 26 February 2022: INEC revises the election date, moving the election to 25 February 2023 and releasing the rest of the electoral timetable.
- 16 March 2022: The Peoples Democratic Party announces its primary schedule, setting 28 and 29 May as its primary days.
- 20 April 2022: The All Progressives Congress announces its primary schedule, setting 30 May and 1 June as its primary days.
- 12 May 2022: In the wake of the Lynching of Deborah Yakubu, then-aspirant Atiku Abubakar is heavily criticized for deleting a tweet condemning the murder.
- 25 May 2022:
  - Then-aspirant Atiku Abubakar releases his five-point governance agenda along with his full policy document.
  - Major PDP aspirant—Peter Obi—withdraws from the party's primary and defects to the Labour Party.
- 27 May 2022: INEC slightly revises its electoral timetable, allowing parties an extra six days to conduct primaries.
- 28 May 2022:
  - The APC revises its primary schedule, delaying the primary to 6–8 June.
  - The PDP holds its primary in Abuja, nominating former Vice President Atiku Abubakar over Nyesom Wike, Bukola Saraki, and nine other candidates.
- 30 May 2022: The LP holds its primary in Asaba, nominating Obi unopposed.
- 7 and 8 June 2022: The APC holds its primary in Abuja, nominating former Governor of Lagos State Bola Tinubu over Rotimi Amaechi, Yemi Osinbajo, and eleven other candidates.
- 16 June 2022: Abubakar picks Ifeanyi Okowa—the Governor of Delta State—as the PDP vice presidential nominee.
- 17 June 2022:
  - Tinubu picks Kabir Ibrahim Masari—a party operative—as the APC placeholder vice presidential nominee to be substituted for someone else at a later date.
  - Obi picks Doyin Okupe—the Obi campaign manager—as the LP placeholder vice presidential nominee to be substituted for someone else at a later date.
- 18 June 2022: Rabiu Kwankwaso, the New Nigeria Peoples Party presidential nominee and the former Governor of Kano State, and Okupe both announce productive discussions between minor parties on forming a coalition for the elections.
- 19 June 2022: APC nominee Abiodun Oyebanji is declared winner of the off-cycle Ekiti State gubernatorial election that took place the day before; the PDP nominee comes a distant third place.
- 24 June 2022: Documentation submitted by Tinubu to INEC is released, revealing that he did not state the primary or secondary school he attended. The new form reignited the longtime certificate and personal history controversies around Tinubu as the form was in direct contradiction with previous sworn forms and public statements.
- 5 July 2022: Okupe announces that LP-NNPP coalition talks have collapsed.
- 7 July 2022: Okupe formally withdraws as LP vice presidential nominee.
- 8 July 2022: Obi picks Yusuf Datti Baba-Ahmed—former Senator for Kaduna North—as the substantive LP vice presidential nominee.
- 10 July 2022:
  - Ibrahim Masari formally withdraws as APC vice presidential nominee.
  - Tinubu picks Kashim Shettima—Senator for Borno Central and former Governor of Borno State—as the substantive APC vice presidential nominee.
- 14 July 2022: Abubakar returns to Nigeria after spending weeks abroad on an undisclosed trip.
- 17 July 2022: PDP nominee Ademola Adeleke is declared winner of the off-cycle Osun State gubernatorial election that took place the day before, gaining the office for the party; the APC nominee comes a close second place.
- 20 July 2022: The appearance of people wearing liturgical garments at the formal Shettima nomination rally leads to controversy as the APC claims the people are clergy while Christian groups and activists mock the group as paid actors without genuine congregations.
- 1 August 2022: After the end of the voter registration period the day before, INEC announces nearly 12.3 million new registered voters.
- 15 September 2022: The first public presidential poll is released. Conducted by NOI Polls for the Anap Foundation, the results show Obi in a slight lead at 21% with Tinubu and Abubakar close behind at 13% each.
- 20 September 2022:
  - Ezenwo Nyesom Wike (PDP)—Governor of Rivers State and runner-up in the PDP presidential primary—withdraws from the Abubakar campaign along with several of his allies. The grouping, (Note: Although there was not a comprehensive list of aggrieved PDP politicians that withdrew from the Abubakar campaign, reporters noted attendants of the meeting where withdrawal was decided upon, namely: Mohammed Bello Adoke, Ibrahim Hassan Dankwambo, Donald Duke, Ayo Fayose, Jerry Gana, Bode George, Jonah David Jang, Seyi Makinde, Olusegun Mimiko, Chibudom Nwuche, and Dan Orbih along with Wike himself.) which had been feuding with Abubakar for months, announced their refusal to assist the PDP presidential campaign until PDP chairman Iyorchia Ayu—an Abubakar ally from Benue State—left his position in favor of a southerner.
  - INEC releases the final list of recognized presidential and vice presidential nominees.

==== Campaign period ====
- 28 September 2022:
  - Official campaign period commences.
  - The PDP Presidential Campaign Council (composition) is inaugurated at the formal commencement of the Abubakar campaign.
- 29 September 2022: Most candidates along with parties' chairmen sign a peace accord in Abuja; Tinubu is absent and sends Shettima as his representative.
- 6 October 2022: Tinubu returns to Nigeria after spending over a week abroad on an undisclosed trip.
- 15 October 2022: Abubakar says that 'northerners do not need Yoruba or Igbo candidates' at an event. The comment is heavily criticized by civil society organisations and opposing campaigns for stoking ethnic divisions.
- 21 October 2022: Tinubu releases his eight-point policy agenda along with his full manifesto before the revised APC Presidential Campaign Council (composition) is inaugurated at the formal commencement of his campaign.
- 28 October 2022: The revised LP Presidential Campaign Council (composition) is inaugurated.
- 29 October 2022: A rally in Lafia marks the formal commencement of the Obi campaign.
- 6 November 2022: The first multi-candidate presidential town hall is hosted by Arise News and the Centre for Democracy and Development; while Obi and Kwankwaso attend, Abubakar was represented by Okowa and Tinubu declined to attend. (Note: As he did not send a representative, Tinubu was replaced by Kola Abiola, the nominee of the People's Redemption Party.)
- 8 November 2022: News outlets publish newly certified United States District Court for the Northern District of Illinois' documents outlining Tinubu's forfeiture of $460,000 alleged to be the proceeds of drug dealing in 1993.
- 14 November 2022: The second multi-candidate presidential town hall is hosted by Arise News and the Centre for Democracy and Development for minor candidates; four candidates attended: Omoyele Sowore (AAC), Yabagi Sani (ADP), Peter Umeadi (APGA), and Adewole Adebayo (SDP).
- 18 November 2022: A poll on rural communities is released by Nextier; the results show Obi leading at 40% with Abubakar in second at 27%, Tinubu in third at 20%, and Kwankwaso in fourth at 5%.
- 20 November 2022: Wike and four other allied PDP governors (Note: Okezie Ikpeazu of Abia State, Samuel Ortom of Benue State, Ifeanyi Ugwuanyi of Enugu State, and Seyi Makinde of Oyo State) form the "Integrity Group" at a meeting in Lagos, continuing the anti-Abubakar movement within the PDP.
- 3 December 2022: Obi releases his seven policy priorities along with his full manifesto.
- 4 December 2022: The third multi-candidate presidential town hall is hosted by Arise News and the Centre for Democracy and Development with Abubakar, Obi, and Kwankwaso in attendance; days prior Tinubu had announced his boycott due to alleged media bias against him.
- 12 December 2022: An attack on an INEC office in Owerri is repulsed, but a police officer is killed along with three assailants. It is the third attack on INEC installations in Imo State since the start of the month, amidst rising concerns over violence during the electoral process.
- 20 December 2022: Okupe resigns as Obi campaign director-general a day after being convicted for money laundering in connection to the 2015 Dasukigate scandal.
- 8 January 2023: Audio alleged to be of Abubakar from June 2018 is released by his former aide Mike Achimugu. In the recording, Abubakar describes the methods he and then-President Olusegun Obasanjo used to siphon public funds during their 1999—2007 administration.
- 11 January 2023:
  - INEC vows to hold the elections as scheduled, a day after a commission official warned that the elections could be postponed if the wave of attacks on INEC offices was not abated.
  - INEC releases the final voter registration statistics, with a total of 93,469,008 eligible voters.
- 7 February 2023: Stears releases the results of its national poll in accompaniment with a predictive model; results show Obi in the lead but with the caveat that Obi's lead would grow if turnout was high while Tinubu would lead if turnout was low.
- 9 February 2023: The National Universities Commission orders the closure of all universities from 22 February to 14 March, a move intended to both allow students to return home to vote and assuage concerns about university safety in case of election turmoil.
- 22 February 2023: Candidates along with other notable political figures sign a peace accord in Abuja.
- 23 February 2023:
  - INEC releases the Permanent Voter Card collection statistics, with a total of 87,209,007 voters (93.3% of all registered voters) having collected their PVCs by the end of the collection window.
  - Official campaign period ends.

=== Summary ===
==== Pre-campaign period ====
For both nominees of the major party, the early parts of the general election campaign in June and July 2022 were dominated by attempts to unify their parties amid the search for a running mate. For Tinubu, the selection of Ibrahim Masari as a placeholder running mate in mid-June bought the APC several weeks to continue party reconciliation efforts as controversy swirled over the religious affiliation of Tinubu's potential running mates. On the other hand, Abubakar had to contend with a burgeoning party crisis as allies of Governor Nyesom Wike—first runner up in the PDP primary—began to publicly protest against the perceived disrespect towards Wike; their protests centered around Abubakar's disregard for a party committee recommendation of Wike for the vice presidential nomination but some PDP figures also objected to Abubakar in general due to the violation of zoning. The upheaval reached the point of Wike allies publicly questioning if they would support Abubakar and privately threatening to leave the party while national party chairman Iyorchia Ayu's neutrality was questioned and Abubakar himself spent weeks abroad in the midst of the crisis. As the PDP desperately attempted to reconcile Wike and Abubakar, Obi and Kwankwaso held meetings with Wike in an attempt to bring him into their respective parties. These meetings took place as representatives of Obi and Kwankwaso were also meeting in an attempt to form a NNPP-LP coalition; however, these negotiations were derailed in early July when Kwankwaso publicly refused to be Obi's vice presidential running mate on the grounds that northerners would not vote for a southeasterner. A few days later, Obi's campaign announced that the coalition discussions had failed and that the campaign had shifted towards the search for a vice presidential nominee which ended in the selection of Baba-Ahmed. As the LP ticket constituted, the PDP crisis continued as Wike publicly met with several APC governors on 8 July while Abubakar extended his stay abroad despite the party infighting, Eid al-Kabir, and the Osun gubernatorial election campaign in mid-July. For Tinubu, when he finally selected Shettima as his running mate on 10 July, immediate blowback confronted his campaign amid accusations of religious intolerance for the Muslim-Muslim ticket with even some other APC members condemning the ticket. Later in July, Abubakar returned to the nation while Tinubu was in a difficult position as backlash against the APC ticket continued and his relative—incumbent Osun Governor Gboyega Oyetola—lost to PDP nominee Ademola Adeleke in the Osun gubernatorial election; similarly, questions emerged over Labour's weak showings in both Osun and Ekiti. Takeaways from the gubernatorial election focused on the potential impact of the PDP's victory on the presidential race and the extremely successful election administration from INEC. To make matters worse for the Tinubu campaign, the appearance of people wearing liturgical garments of various Christian denominations at Shettima's nomination rally on 20 July led to further backlash since observers noted the group's lack of identification and the Christian Association of Nigeria publicly challenged the APC to name the supposed clergy.

By late July and early August, Tinubu and Abubakar continued to face high-profile dissent from within their own parties as prominent northern Christian APC members—like former Secretary to the Government of the Federation Babachir David Lawal and former Speaker of the House of Representatives Yakubu Dogara—publicly condemned the same religion APC ticket while Wike and his allies continued their public criticism of Abubakar and PDP leadership. In response, Tinubu appointed Governor of Plateau State Simon Lalong—a northern Christian—as the Director-General of his Campaign Council while in early August, Abubakar and Wike finally met for the first time since Okowa's selection and agreed on a reconciliation framework. However, both the APC and PDP backslid into their respective crises as protests against the APC ticket drew thousands and it continued to come under fire from prominent northern Christians while the opposing camps within the PDP had returned to public squabbling by mid-August. Around the same time, voter registration ended with analysts noting its effect on the race as a whole. The rest of August was dominated by notable meetings as Wike meet with both Tinubu and Obi before another reconciliatory summit with Abubakar; while pundits speculated that Tinubu and Obi attempted to sway Wike to their camps, reporting on the series of Wike-Abubakar talks revealed some of Wike's demands with a focus on the resignation of PDP chairman Iyorchia Ayu. The location of these meetings in London, England sparked controversy as critics labeled the location as insensitive to the plight of Nigerians domestically. Around the same time, observers noted a potential opening for Kwankwaso but even his NNPP devolved into crisis in August as the PDP poached a key Kano State figure from the NNPP amid a threeway fight for the state's massive electorate. Further reporting began to focus on specific states and regions as ThisDay analysis surmised that the PDP was strengthening in previously pro-Buhari states in the North West, the APC was retaining its prime position in the South West but the LP was growing among urban youth, it was Obi vs. Abubakar in the South South and South East, and the North Central was a tossup region. In the weeks afterwards and as candidate profiles were released in preparation for the official campaign period's commencement at the end of September, the PDP desperately attempted to end its crisis by having two northerners holding prominent internal party positions be replaced by southerners but as Ayu remained in office as chairman, Wike continued his public indignation before he and his allies announced their withdrawal from PDP campaigning on 20 September until Ayu left office. Due to the PDP infighting, pundits looking ahead to the campaign period began to speculate on the potential benefits for Tinubu and Obi as several Wike allies are influential in key states. At the same time, the first public poll of the race was released with Obi in the lead; although the campaigns of Abubakar and Tinubu dismissed the results, analysts noted enthusiasm among Obi's base due to his active campaigning as a potential reason for his lead considering both Abubakar and Tinubu devoted more effort to intraparty reconciliation from May to September.

==== Campaign period ====
At the end of September, the official campaign period began with the signing of a peace accord in Abuja by nearly all candidates along with parties' national chairmen; notably, Tinubu was absent with Shettima as his representative. During the week, Abubakar and Tinubu formed their campaign councils amid controversy for both as the Wike dispute continued in the PDP while the composition of the APC campaign council led to internal disquiet. For Obi, his campaign received another positive polling result as he led a Bloomberg News-commissioned poll by a massive margin; he was also buoyed by significant nationwide support rallies on Independence Day but faced difficulties in campaign organizing as his manifesto and campaign council were delayed. Overall, late September and early October was categorized similarly to the pre-campaign period time, with analysis repeatedly noting that Obi was solidifying support and enthusiasm while Abubakar and Tinubu were occupied trying to stop further intraparty rebellion. (Note: In the APC, renewed criticism over the same religion ticket along with internal disputes about the Tinubu campaign council composition dominated the time period while in the PDP, the ongoing Wike dispute continued along with a new intraparty financial scandal.) However, Obi promptly faced scandal due to the controversial initial makeup of his campaign council which forced a retraction and review after backlash from supporters and the LP. A few days later, the race was derailed by a video of Abubakar calling for northerners to reject Yoruba or Igbo candidates; the comment met with widespread condemnation by civil society organisations and opposing campaigns for stoking ethnic divisions. Meanwhile, Tinubu and the APC revised their campaign council to address internal objections before holding a formal campaign commencement on 21 October where Buhari unveiled Tinubu's manifesto before inaugurating the campaign council. Around the same time, campaigning focused on catastrophic nationwide floods with analysts noting that the floods had put more focus on climate change and wider environmental policy issues amid the campaign period. Obi preparations concluded near the end of the month, as the revised LP campaign council was inaugurated on 28 October and the campaign's commencement rally held the next day.

At the start of November, debates began with a series of multi-candidate town halls hosted by Arise News and the Centre for Democracy and Development commencing on 6 November; with a focus on security and the economy, the four most prominent candidates were invited—Abubakar, Kwankwaso, Obi, and Tinubu—but Abubakar sent Okowa as his proxy while Tinubu declined the invitation and was replaced by Kola Abiola, the nominee of the People's Redemption Party. Amid the town halls, controversy swirled for Tinubu as the publication of certified documents from the United States District Court for the Northern District of Illinois detailing his 1993 forfeiture of alleged drug dealing proceeds led to attacks from Obi and Abubakar while the Tinubu campaign claimed that the money was tax-related and analysts speculated on the documents' effect on voting intentions. Meanwhile, Abubakar faced mixed news as the PDP crisis continued with Wike-led, anti-Abubakar PDP governors forming the "Integrity Group" and a rift forming with another incumbent governor in mid-November; on the other hand, a northern APC dissenter group led by former House Speaker Yakubu Dogara endorsed Abubakar on 2 December. Previously, Obi led another poll as a Nextier survey of rural communities released in mid-November showed him in the lead with over 40%. At the beginning of December, various state LP chapters entered crisis but Obi avoided involvement and instead released his oft-delayed manifesto with seven key policy areas. The manifesto release came just before another Arise-CDD town hall; however, Tinubu had announced his boycott of the event due to alleged media bias so only Abubakar, Obi, and Kwankwaso attended on 4 December.

Later in December, the Obi campaign was hit by a court ruling against its Director-General—Doyin Okupe, convicting him of money laundering in connection to the 2015 Dasukigate scandal. Although Okupe appealed the judgment, the controversy led to his resignation from the campaign with journalist Akin Osuntokun replacing him. Meanwhile, the reporting revealed that "Integrity Group" were deliberating over which candidate to endorse at their London meetings in late December; a side attendee of the meetings—former President Olusegun Obasanjo—reportedly advised the group to endorse Obi, which Obasanjo himself later did in a public letter on New Year's Day. Into the new year, analysis shifted to review the chances of each major candidate as the prospect of a runoff looked increasingly possible. While pundits initially contended that Tinubu would benefit from the campaign support of Buhari and the "federal might" of his administration, questions arose over the relationship between Buhari and Tinubu after Buhari skipped several campaign events and defended the controversial new naira notes that Tinubu claimed were an attempt to disrupt his campaign. For Abubakar, reporting focused on two corruption scandals along with his nationwide campaigning (especially in the North). Observers reiterated that Kwankwaso had not appeared to make significant headway outside of his native North West while reports claimed Obi's chances were based on his campaign's ability to successfully turnout voters in the South East in addition to geographically broadening his support across the nation despite the lack of significant LP party structure.

The final month of the campaign period was dominated by the naira crisis and its political implications. The new banknote policy of Buhari and CBN Governor Godwin Emefiele was intended to curb vote buying ahead of the election but poor implementation led to shortages of the new currency. Tinubu and several prominent APC figures publicly broke with Buhari for some of the first times over the policy, first suing to stop its enactment then lambasting the administration after Buhari stood by the policy. For the PDP, the G5 failed to publicize their joint preferred candidate and appeared to split as Benue Governor Samuel Ortom endorsed Obi while Wike reportedly backed Tinubu. For his part, Abubakar focused on his economic plans and national unity in his final campaign stops rather than party divisions. Similarly, Obi rounded out the campaign with large rallies in Lagos that spotlighted his support of reforms to fight corruption and create jobs; however, the events were marred by violence as mass coordinated attacks on LP supporters before the rallies reinforced fears of further violence on election day. As the campaigns concluded, focus returned to polling as releases from Nextier, Stears, Premise Data for Bloomberg, NIO Polls for the Anap Foundation, and Redfield & Wilton Strategies all issued polls in the months of January and February that showed Obi in the lead and sparking discourse on the surge of polling compared to previous elections. In addition to polling, Stears notably created a predictive model that estimated that Obi would win by a significant margin if voter turnout was high while low turnout would lead to a Tinubu victory. To end the campaign, all candidates signed another peace accord at an Abuja event attended by Buhari, Abubakar, Obi, Kwankwaso, and Tinubu in addition to other candidates and major political figures on 23 February, the final day of the campaign period.

=== Polling ===
Polling organisation/client	Fieldwork date	Sample size					Others	Undecided	None/No response/Refused
Polling organisation/client	Fieldwork date	Sample size	Tinubu APC	Obi LP	Kwankwaso NNPP	Abubakar PDP	Others	Undecided	None/No response/Refused
NIO Polls for Anap Foundation	September 2022	1,000	13%	21%	3%	13%	1%	32%	17%
Premise Data for Bloomberg	5–20 September 2022	3,027	16%	72%	–	9%	4%	–	–
Commencement of the official campaign period. (28 September 2022)
NIO Polls for Anap Foundation	December 2022	1,000	13%	23%	2%	10%	–	29%	23%
SBM Intelligence	December 2022	7000	36%	22%	3%	33%		6%	
Nextier	January 2023	3,000	24%	37%	6%	27%	1%	–	5%
Stears	January 2023	6,220	15.5%	27.4%	2%	12.3%	–	37.5%	–
SBM Intelligence	16 January - 3 February 2023	11534	18%	36%	1%	24%		27%	
Premise Data for Bloomberg	26 January-4 February 2023	2,384	18%	66%	–	10%	6%	–	–
NIO Polls for Anap Foundation	February 2023	2,000	13%	21%	3%	10%	–	23%	30%
Redfield & Wilton Strategies	10-12 February 2023	3,351	22%	62%	3%	12%	1%	–	–

=== Election debates and town halls ===
At the start of November, fora began as individual town halls moderated by Kadaria Ahmed were held throughout the month while a series of multi-candidate town halls hosted by Arise News and the Centre for Democracy and Development commenced on 6 November. With a focus on security and the economy, the four most prominent candidates were invited—Abubakar, Kwankwaso, Obi, and Tinubu—but Abubakar sent Okowa as his proxy while Tinubu declined the invitation and was replaced by Kola Abiola, the nominee of the People's Redemption Party. The non-attendance sparked controversy as Abubakar and Tinubu were criticized for non-engagement with public debates by the Obi campaign which later vowed to boycott events without the presence of Abubakar or Tinubu. During the debate, Obi labeled poverty as a key source of violence and attacked the incumbent administration on security failures while vowing to remove fuel subsidies; Okowa backed the creation of state police forces along with targeted job creation methods; Kwankwaso identified educational failures as a cause of both insecurity and economic issues; and Abiola labeled poor leadership as a key factor in security failures.

The Arise-CDD series continued with a minor candidate town hall on 14 November where alternative security methods and the economy dominated discussion. Although a Nigerian Economic Summit Group-hosted economic debate was scheduled for the next day, it was canceled due to "prevailing circumstances". Major candidates returned on 4 December to the Arise-CDD series with Obi, Kwankwaso, and Abubakar but Tinubu publicly declined the invitation and accused Arise of biased unprofessionalism. Despite Tinubu's absence, the town hall went ahead with a focus on education, healthcare, poverty, and human capital development—all three candidates lamented poor educational quality and brain drain with Obi targeting low investment in education as the source of the issue. Notably, when asked if they would commit to using Nigerian health services, Abubakar refused while Obi and Kwankwaso acceded. A few weeks later in January, a Nigerian Elections Debate Group-organized debate set for 26 January was postponed due to logistical problems; the debate was instead held on 12 February. Despite inviting all four major candidates, only Kwankwaso and Obi confirmed their attendance; however, technical issues with the Obi campaign airplane prevented him from attending and left just Kwankwaso to answer questions.

2023 Nigerian presidential election debates and town halls
Date	Organisers	P Present (Note: Denotes a party presidential nominee attending the event.) S Surrogate (Note: Denotes a party presidential nominee not attending the event, sending a surrogate in their place.) R Present replacement (Note: Denotes the attendance of a replacement invitee due to the non-attendance of an original invitee.) NI Not invited A Absent invitee N No debate										
Date	Organisers	ADP	AAC	APC	APGA	LP	NNPP	PDP	PRP	SDP	Other parties	Ref.
6 November 2022	Arise News and the CDD	NI	NI	A Tinubu	NI	P Obi	P Kwankwaso	S Okowa	R Abiola	NI	NI; Multiple	
14 November 2022	Arise News and the CDD	P Sani	P Sowore	NI	P Umeadi	NI	NI	NI	NI	P Adebayo	NI; Multiple	
~~15 November 2022~~	NESG and NEDG	NI	NI	N Tinubu	NI	N Obi	N Kwankwaso	N Abubakar	NI	NI	NI; Multiple	
4 December 2022	Arise News and the CDD	NI	NI	A Tinubu	NI	P Obi	P Kwankwaso	P Abubakar	NI	NI	NI; Multiple	
12 February 2023	NEDG	NI	NI	A Tinubu	NI	A Obi	P Kwankwaso	A Abubakar	NI	NI	NI; Multiple	

=== Projections ===
State or territory	2019 result	2023 result	Africa Elects (Note: AfricaElects projections predict the likelihood of a candidate winning a state by categorizing a state as "Safe" for exceedingly likely, "Likely" for somewhat likely, and "Lean" for least likely. If no clear determination could be made, states are categorized as "tossups".) 24 February 2023	Dataphyte (Note: Dataphyte and ThisDay projections predict candidates' projected votal shares in each state.) 11 February 2023				Enough is Enough- SBM Intelligence (Note: EiE-SBM projections predict which candidates will win states.) 17 February 2023	SBM Intelligence (Note: SBM projections predict which candidates will win states or, if no determination could be made, categorizes states as "Too close to call" (TCC).) 15 December 2022	ThisDay 27 December 2022					The Nation (Note: The Nation projections predict which candidates will win states or, if no determination could be made, categorizes states as "Battlegrounds.") 12–19 Feb 2023
				Tinubu	Obi	Abubakar	Others			Tinubu	Obi	Kwankwaso	Abubakar	Others/ Undecided	
Abia	AA+41.65%	PO+82.27%	Safe Obi	14.38%	62.79%	18.99%	3.84%	Obi	Obi	10%	60%	–	15%	15%	Obi
Adamawa	AA+3.96%	AA+32.11%	Safe Abubakar	24.51%	20.60%	37.55%	17.34%	Abubakar	Abubakar	20%	10%	5%	60%	5%	Abubakar
Akwa Ibom	AA+38.08%	AA+9.61%	Lean Obi	17.07%	56.29%	22.75%	3.89%	Obi	Abubakar	15%	30%	–	40%	15%	Abubakar
Anambra	AA+81.13%	PO+93.77%	Safe Obi	20.06%	67.10%	6.53%	6.32%	Obi	Obi	5%	70%	–	10%	15%	Obi
Bauchi	MB+57.52%	AA+12.88%	Likely Abubakar	19.80%	8.07%	65.12%	7.00%	Abubakar	Abubakar	20%	5%	15%	40%	20%	Battleground
Bayelsa	AA+24.58%	AA+11.39%	Lean Obi	20.87%	45.03%	28.05%	6.05%	Abubakar	Abubakar	20%	30%	–	40%	10%	Abubakar
Benue	AA+1.25%	BT+0.28%	Likely Obi	24.44%	33.57%	24.44%	17.54%	Obi	Obi	20%	30%	10%	25%	15%	Battleground
Borno	MB+83.14%	BT+13.19%	Safe Tinubu	45.37%	4.95%	45.37%	4.32%	Abubakar	Tinubu	40%	–	20%	35%	5%	Tinubu
Cross River	AA+42.30%	PO+11.85%	Likely Obi	46.74%	38.97%	7.62%	6.68%	Obi	Obi	25%	35%	–	20%	20%	Battleground
Delta	AA+44.92%	PO+29.29%	Tossup	15.99%	57.94%	20.84%	5.23%	Obi	Abubakar	15%	35%	–	40%	10%	Abubakar
Ebonyi	AA+46.74%	PO+66.80%	Safe Obi	37.72%	46.85%	8.24%	7.19%	Obi	Obi	15%	60%	–	15%	15%	Obi
Edo	AA+1.40%	PO+32.11%	Likely Obi	25.14%	31.46%	25.14%	18.25%	Obi	Obi	15%	35%	–	35%	15%	Battleground
Ekiti	MB+17.11%	BT+36.32%	Safe Tinubu	38.33%	33.52%	15.47%	12.62%	Tinubu	Tinubu	45%	15%	–	20%	20%	Tinubu
Enugu	AA+71.52%	PO+90.46%	Safe Obi	16.42%	56.65%	21.50%	5.43%	Obi	Obi	10%	60%	–	15%	15%	Obi
FCT	AA+25.42%	PO+41.47%	Likely Obi	33.01%	28.90%	20.68%	17.41%	Obi	Abubakar	N/A					Battleground
Gombe	MB+47.72%	AA+33.35%	Likely Abubakar	39.05%	11.95%	39.05%	9.95%	Abubakar	Abubakar	20%	15%	5%	40%	20%	Tinubu
Imo	AA+38.01%	PO+62.43%	Safe Obi	30.25%	55.10%	8.23%	6.43%	Obi	Obi	15%	60%	–	20%	5%	Battleground
Jigawa	MB+45.63%	BT+3.78%	Tossup	44.61%	6.10%	44.61%	4.69%	Tinubu	Tinubu	25%	–	25%	35%	15%	Tinubu
Kaduna	MB+20.67%	AA+11.40%	Tossup	34.71%	16.56%	34.71%	14.02%	Abubakar	Abubakar	30%	20%	20%	25%	5%	Tinubu
Kano	MB+56.74%	RK+28.19%	Lean Kwankwaso	45.57%	4.96%	45.57%	3.89%	Tinubu	Too close to call	30%	5%	40%	20%	5%	Tinubu
Katsina	MB+59.41%	AA+0.63%	Lean Tinubu	46.27%	4.10%	46.27%	3.36%	Abubakar	Tinubu	30%	–	30%	35%	5%	Tinubu
Kebbi	MB+56.47%	AA+6.63%	Lean Abubakar	42.87%	7.91%	42.87%	6.36%	Abubakar	Too close to call	35%	–	20%	35%	10%	Tinubu
Kogi	MB+12.99%	BT+20.93%	Tossup	37.73%	21.55%	22.54%	18.18%	Obi	Tinubu	35%	15%	5%	35%	15%	Tinubu
Kwara	MB+37.16%	BT+26.95%	Likely Tinubu	42.54%	17.66%	25.21%	14.59%	Tinubu	Too close to call	35%	10%	10%	40%	5%	Tinubu
Lagos	MB+12.19%	PO+0.77%	Tossup	44.61%	18.53%	21.21%	15.66%	Tinubu	Tinubu	45%	25%	5%	20%	5%	Tinubu
Nasarawa	MB+1.05%	PO+3.41%	Tossup	37.54%	21.11%	23.70%	17.65%	Obi	Tinubu	30%	25%	10%	25%	10%	Tinubu
Niger	MB+46.29%	BT+11.59%	Tossup	47.59%	16.94%	20.88%	14.58%	Abubakar	Tinubu	35%	10%	10%	35%	10%	Tinubu
Ogun	MB+15.44%	BT+37.53%	Likely Tinubu	44.95%	18.14%	21.63%	15.28%	Tinubu	Tinubu	45%	5%	15%	20%	15%	Tinubu
Ondo	AA+6.14%	BT+46.19%	Likely Tinubu	37.86%	33.36%	15.85%	12.93%	Obi	Tinubu	45%	10%	10%	20%	15%	Tinubu
Osun	MB+1.43%	AA+1.42%	Likely Tinubu	38.27%	19.99%	25.18%	16.56%	Tinubu	Abubakar	35%	5%	5%	35%	20%	Tinubu
Oyo	AA+0.17%	BT+32.98%	Lean Tinubu	37.84%	19.95%	25.11%	17.10%	Tinubu	Tinubu	40%	15%	10%	20%	15%	Tinubu
Plateau	AA+7.74%	PO+14.62%	Lean Obi	33.02%	29.97%	20.12%	16.89%	Obi	Obi	20%	35%	5%	35%	5%	Battleground
Rivers	AA+50.34%	BT+10.80%	Likely Obi	14.49%	62.46%	19.27%	3.83%	Obi	Abubakar	10%	35%	–	15%	40%	Battleground
Sokoto	MB+14.77%	AA+0.55%	Likely Abubakar	28.49%	8.32%	56.89%	6.31%	Abubakar	Abubakar	35%	–	15%	40%	10%	Battleground
Taraba	AA+6.99%	AA+8.55%	Lean Abubakar	27.52%	27.37%	33.77%	16.35%	Obi	Abubakar	10%	20%	20%	40%	10%	Abubakar
Yobe	MB+79.93%	AA+12.44%	Likely Tinubu	46.69%	3.62%	46.69%	3.00%	Abubakar	Tinubu	40%	–	15%	30%	15%	Tinubu
Zamfara	MB+54.16%	BT+20.76%	Lean Tinubu	43.30%	7.51%	43.30%	5.69%	Tinubu	Tinubu	35%	–	20%	35%	10%	Tinubu

== Results ==
=== General ===
Candidate	Running mate	Party	Votes	%
Bola Tinubu	Kashim Shettima	APC	8,794,726	37.62
Atiku Abubakar	Ifeanyi Okowa	PDP	6,984,520	29.88
Peter Obi	Yusuf Datti Baba-Ahmed	LP	6,101,533	26.10
Rabiu Kwankwaso	Isaac Idahosa	NNPP	1,496,687	6.40
Christopher Imumolen	Bello Bala Maru	A		
Hamza al-Mustapha	Chukwuka Johnson	AA		
Yabagi Sani	Udo Okey-Okoro	ADP		
Osita Nnadi	Isa Hamisu	APP		
Omoyele Sowore	Haruna Garba Magashi	AAC		
Dumebi Kachikwu	Ahmed Buhari	ADC		
Peter Umeadi	Abdullahi Muhammed Koli	APGA		
Princess Chichi Ojei	Ibrahim Mohammed	APM		
Sunday Adenuga	Mustapha Usman Turaki	BP		
Felix Johnson Osakwe	Yahaya Muhammad Kyabo	NRM		
Kola Abiola	Haro Haruna Zego	PRP		
Adewole Adebayo	Yusuf Buhari	SDP		
Malik Ado-Ibrahim	Kasarachi Enyinna	YPP		
Dan Nwanyanwu	Ramalan Abubakar	ZLP		
Total			23,377,466	100.00
Registered voters/turnout			93,469,008	–

==== By geopolitical zone ====
Geopolitical zone	Bola Tinubu APC			Atiku Abubakar PDP			Peter Obi LP			Rabiu Kwankwaso NNPP			Others		Total valid votes	Turnout (%)
Geopolitical zone	Votes	%	T.	Votes	%	T.	Votes	%	T.	Votes	%	T.	Votes	%	Total valid votes	Turnout (%)
North Central (Note: Comprising the states of Benue, Kogi, Kwara, Nasarawa, Niger, and Plateau in addition to the Federal Capital Territory.)	1,760,993	38.58%	6	1,162,087	25.46%	4	1,415,577	31.01%	4	60,056	1.32%	0	165,638	3.63%	4,564,351	%
North East (Note: Comprising the states of Adamawa, Bauchi, Borno, Gombe, Taraba, and Yobe.)	1,185,458	34.50%	6	1,737,846	50.58%	6	315,107	9.17%	1	126,343	3.68%	0	70,987	2.07%	3,435,741	%
North West (Note: Comprising the states of Jigawa, Kaduna, Kano, Katsina, Kebbi, Sokoto, and Zamfara.)	2,652,235	39.64%	7	2,329,540	34.82%	6	350,182	5.23%	0	1,268,250	18.96%	1	90,415	1.35%	6,690,622	%
South East (Note: Comprising the states of Abia, Anambra, Ebonyi, Enugu, and Imo.)	127,370	5.72%	0	90,968	4.09%	0	1,952,998	87.78%	5	8,211	0.37%	0	45,387	2.04%	2,224,934	%
South South (Note: Comprising the states of Akwa Ibom, Bayelsa, Cross River, Delta, Edo, and Rivers.)	799,957	27.99%	4	717,908	25.12%	3	1,210,675	42.37%	5	17,167	0.60%	0	111,933	3.92%	2,857,640	%
South West (Note: Comprising the states of Ekiti, Lagos, Ogun, Ondo, Osun, and Oyo.)	2,279,407	53.59%	6	941,941	22.15%	2	846,478	19.90%	1	16,644	0.39%	0	168,972	3.97%	4,253,442	%
Total	8,794,726	36.61%	29	6,984,520	29.07%	21	6,101,533	25.40%	16	1,496,687	6.23%	1	648,474	2.59%	24,025,940	26.71%

==== By state ====
State	Bola Tinubu APC			Atiku Abubakar PDP			Peter Obi LP			Rabiu Kwankwaso NNPP			Others		Total valid votes	Turnout (%)
State	Votes	%	T.	Votes	%	T.	Votes	%	T.	Votes	%	T.	Votes	%	Total valid votes	Turnout (%)
Abia	8,914	2.41%	0	22,676	6.13%	0	327,095	88.40%	1	1,239	0.33%	0	10,113	2.73%	370,037	18.00%
Adamawa	182,881	25.01%	1	417,611	57.12%	1	105,648	14.45%	0	8,006	1.10%	0	16,994	2.32%	731,140	34.67%
Akwa Ibom	160,620	28.94%	1	214,012	38.55%	1	132,683	23.90%	0	7,796	1.41%	0	39,978	7.20%	555,089	24.92%
Anambra	5,111	0.83%	0	9,036	1.47%	0	584,621	95.24%	1	1,967	0.32%	0	13,126	2.14%	613,861	24.63%
Bauchi	316,694	37.10%	1	426,607	49.98%	1	27,373	3.21%	0	72,103	8.45%	0	10,739	1.26%	853,516	31.10%
Bayelsa	42,572	25.75%	1	68,818	41.62%	1	49,975	30.23%	1	540	0.33%	0	3,420	2.07%	165,325	16.38%
Benue	310,468	40.32%	1	130,081	16.89%	0	308,372	40.04%	1	4,740	0.62%	0	16,414	2.13%	770,075	28.72%
Borno	252,282	54.22%	1	190,921	41.03%	1	7,205	1.55%	0	4,626	0.99%	0	10,253	2.20%	465,287	19.94%
Cross River	130,520	31.30%	1	95,425	22.89%	0	179,917	43.15%	1	1,644	0.39%	0	9,462	2.27%	416,968	26.10%
Delta	90,183	14.66%	0	161,600	26.26%	1	341,866	55.55%	1	3,122	0.51%	0	18,570	3.02%	615,341	20.32%
Ebonyi	42,402	13.03%	0	13,503	4.15%	0	259,738	79.83%	1	1,661	0.51%	0	8,047	2.48%	325,351	21.58%
Edo	144,471	24.86%	0	89,585	15.41%	0	331,163	56.97%	1	2,743	0.47%	0	13,304	2.29%	581,266	24.01%
Ekiti	201,494	65.38%	1	89,554	29.06%	1	11,397	3.70%	0	264	0.09%	0	5,462	1.77%	308,171	31.84%
Enugu	4,772	1.05%	0	15,749	3.45%	0	428,640	93.91%	1	1,808	0.40%	0	5,455	1.20%	456,424	22.19%
F.C.T.	90,902	19.76%	0	74,194	16.13%	0	281,717	61.23%	1	4,517	0.98%	0	8,741	1.90%	460,071	30.48%
Gombe	146,977	28.82%	1	317,123	62.17%	1	26,160	5.13%	0	10,520	2.06%	0	9,263	1.82%	510,043	33.87%
Imo	66,171	14.41%	0	30,004	6.53%	0	352,904	76.84%	1	1,536	0.33%	0	8,646	1.88%	459,261	22.10%
Jigawa	421,390	45.78%	1	386,587	42.00%	1	1,889	0.20%	0	98,234	10.67%	0	12,431	1.35%	920,531	40.78%
Kaduna	399,293	29.36%	1	554,360	40.76%	1	294,494	21.65%	0	92,969	6.83%	0	19,037	1.40%	1,360,153	32.33%
Kano	517,341	30.40%	1	131,716	7.74%	0	28,513	1.67%	0	997,279	58.59%	1	27,156	1.60%	1,702,005	30.15%
Katsina	482,283	45.56%	1	489,045	46.19%	1	6,376	0.60%	0	69,386	6.56%	0	11,583	1.09%	1,058,673	31.03%
Kebbi	248,088	44.34%	1	285,175	50.97%	1	10,682	1.91%	0	5,038	0.90%	0	10,539	1.88%	559,522	29.81%
Kogi	240,751	52.70%	1	145,104	31.77%	1	56,217	12.31%	0	4,238	0.93%	0	10,480	2.29%	456,790	24.63%
Kwara	263,572	56.08%	1	136,909	29.13%	1	31,186	6.63%	0	3,141	0.67%	0	35,203	7.49%	469,971	29.29%
Lagos	572,606	45.04%	1	75,750	5.96%	0	582,454	45.81%	1	8,442	0.66%	0	32,199	2.53%	1,271,451	18.92%
Nasarawa	172,922	31.99%	1	147,093	27.21%	1	191,361	35.40%	1	12,715	2.35%	0	16,475	3.05%	540,566	21.82%
Niger	375,183	48.18%	1	284,898	36.59%	1	80,452	10.33%	0	21,836	2.81%	0	16,299	2.09%	778,668	30.49%
Ogun	341,554	58.88%	1	123,831	21.35%	0	85,829	14.79%	0	2,200	0.38%	0	26,710	4.60%	580,124	22.75%
Ondo	369,924	67.14%	1	115,463	20.95%	0	44,405	8.06%	0	930	0.17%	0	20,286	3.68%	551,008	28.62%
Osun	343,945	46.91%	1	354,366	48.33%	1	23,283	3.17%	0	713	0.10%	0	10,896	1.49%	733,203	38.71%
Oyo	449,884	55.58%	1	182,977	22.60%	0	99,110	12.24%	0	4,095	0.51%	0	73,419	9.07%	809,485	26.32%
Plateau	307,195	28.23%	1	243,808	22.41%	0	466,272	42.85%	1	8,869	0.81%	0	62,026	5.70%	1,088,170	40.33%
Rivers	231,591	44.23%	1	88,468	16.90%	0	175,071	33.43%	1	1,322	0.25%	0	27,199	5.19%	523,651	16.71%
Sokoto	285,444	48.64%	1	288,679	49.19%	1	6,568	1.12%	0	1,300	0.22%	0	4,824	0.82%	586,815	29.84%
Taraba	135,165	27.07%	1	189,017	37.85%	1	146,315	29.30%	1	12,818	2.57%	0	16,043	3.21%	499,358	26.67%
Yobe	151,459	40.03%	1	196,567	52.47%	1	2,406	0.64%	0	18,270	4.83%	0	7,695	2.03%	378,397	26.75%
Zamfara	298,396	59.33%	1	193,978	38.57%	1	1,660	0.33%	0	4,044	0.81%	0	4,845	0.96%	502,923	27.64%
Total	8,794,726	36.61%	29	6,984,520	29.07%	21	6,101,533	25.40%	16	1,496,687	6.23%	1	648,474	2.59%	24,025,940	26.71%
	Tinubu			Abubakar			Obi			Kwankwaso			Others		Valid	Turnout

===== Close states =====
States where the margin of victory was under 1%:

1. Benue State, 0.28% (2,096 votes) margin for Tinubu
2. Sokoto State, 0.55% (3,235 votes) margin for Abubakar
3. Katsina State, 0.63% (6,762 votes) margin for Abubakar
4. Lagos State, 0.77% (9,848 votes) margin for Obi

States where the margin of victory was between 1% and 5%:

1. Osun State, 1.42% (10,421 votes) margin for Abubakar
2. Nasarawa State, 3.41% (18,439 votes) margin for Obi
3. Jigawa State, 3.78% (34,803 votes) margin for Tinubu

States where the margin of victory was between 5% and 10%:

1. Kebbi State, 6.63% (37,087 votes) margin for Abubakar
2. Taraba State, 8.55% (42,702 votes) margin for Abubakar
3. Akwa Ibom State, 9.61% (53,392 votes) margin for Abubakar

==== Maps ====
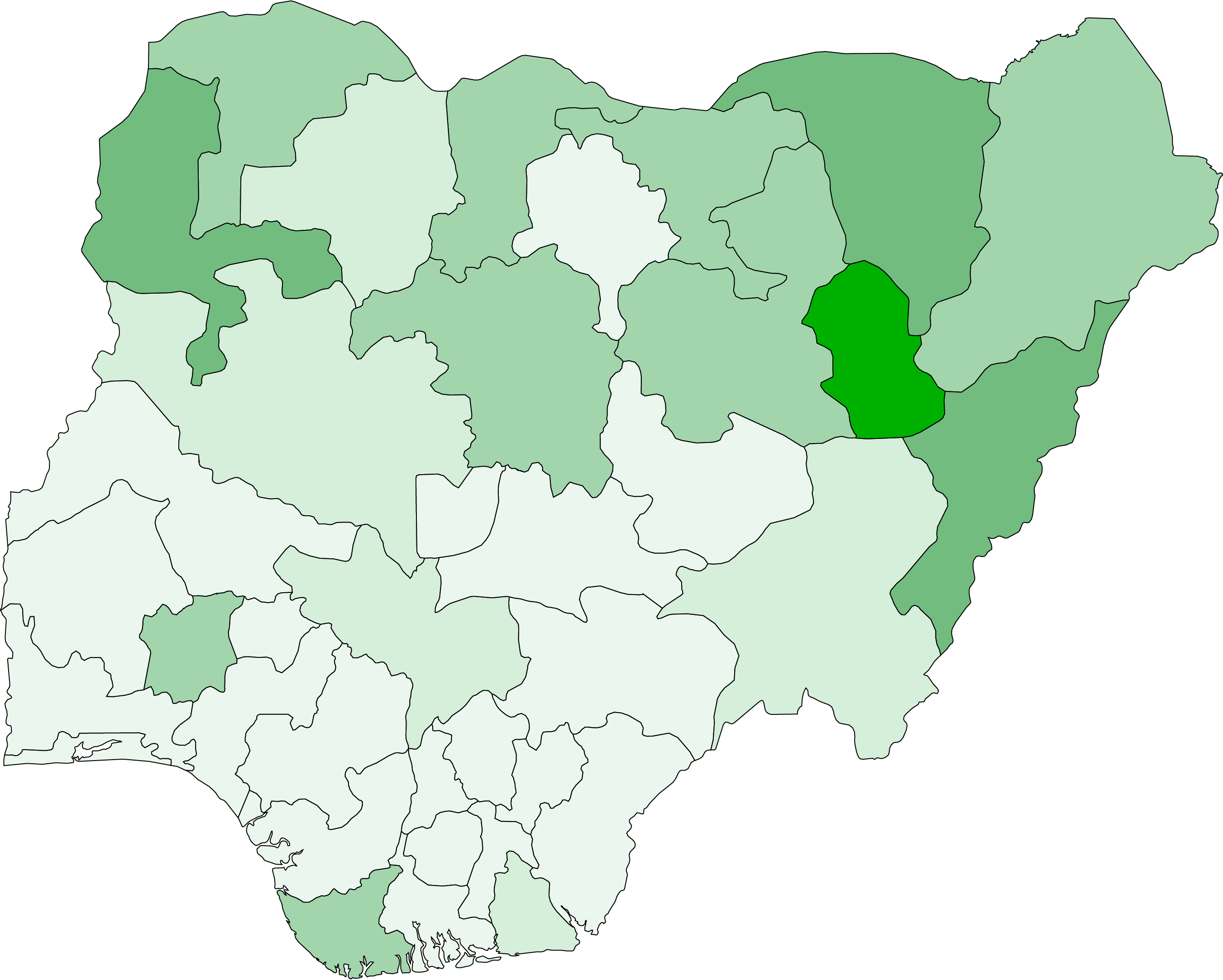
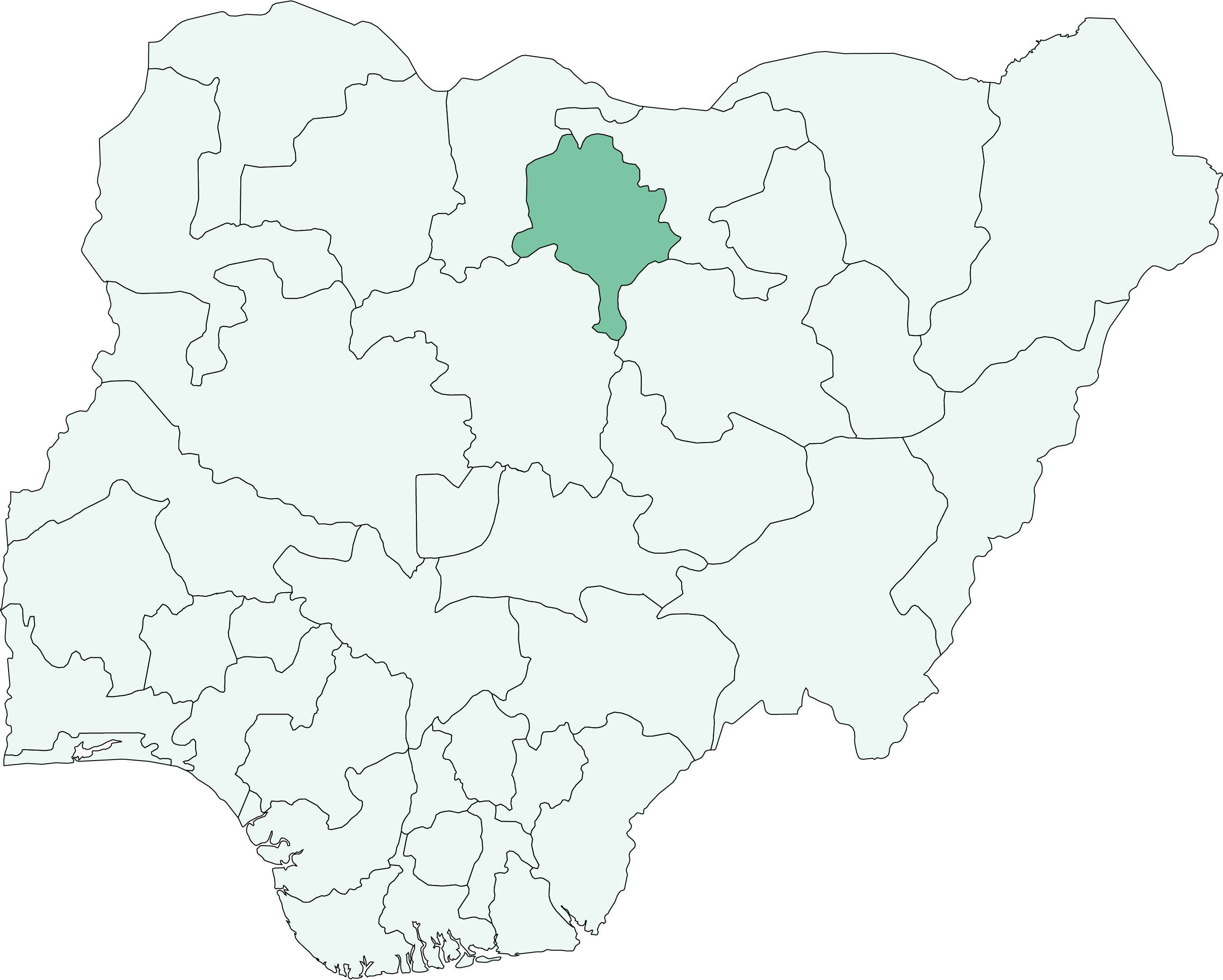
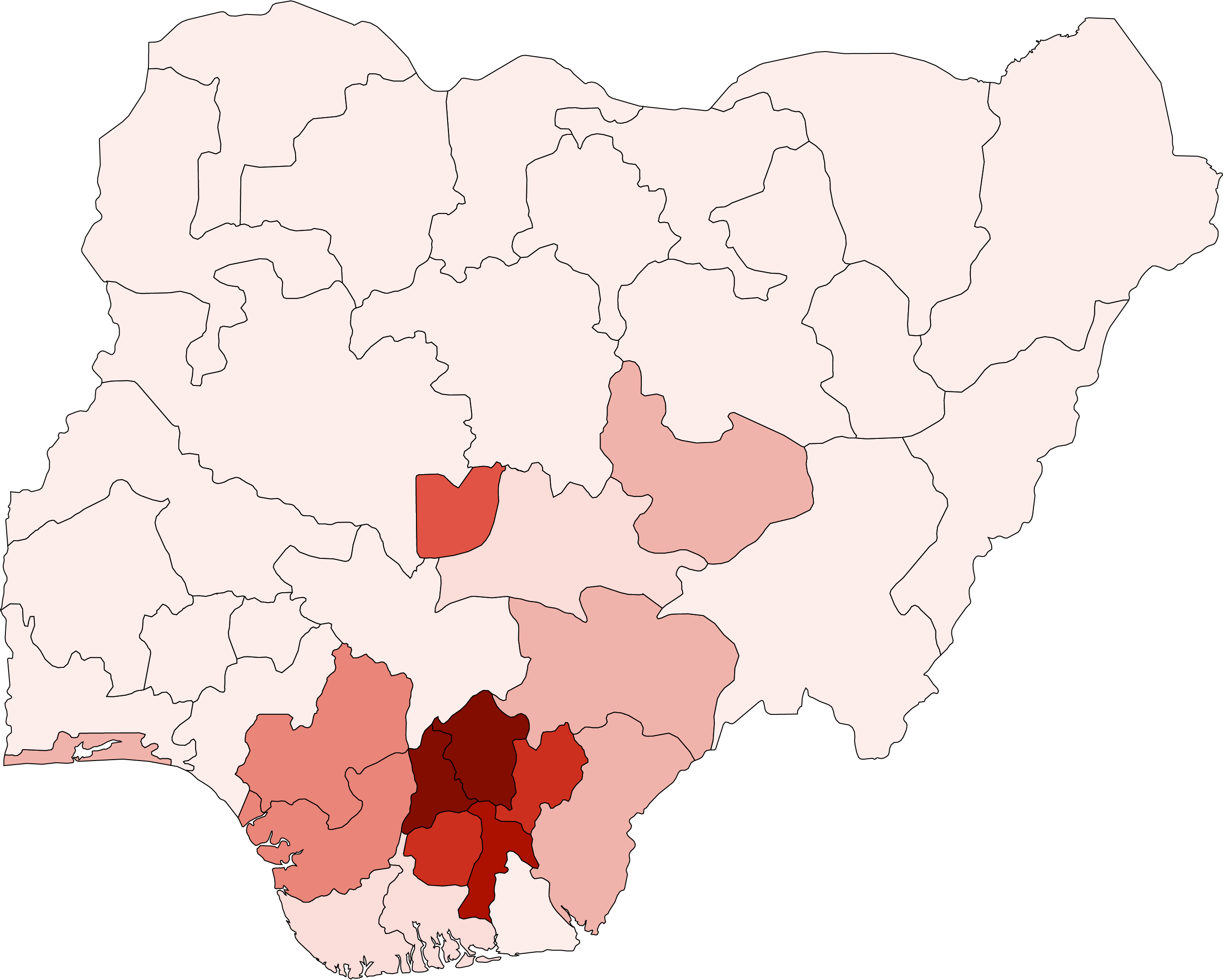
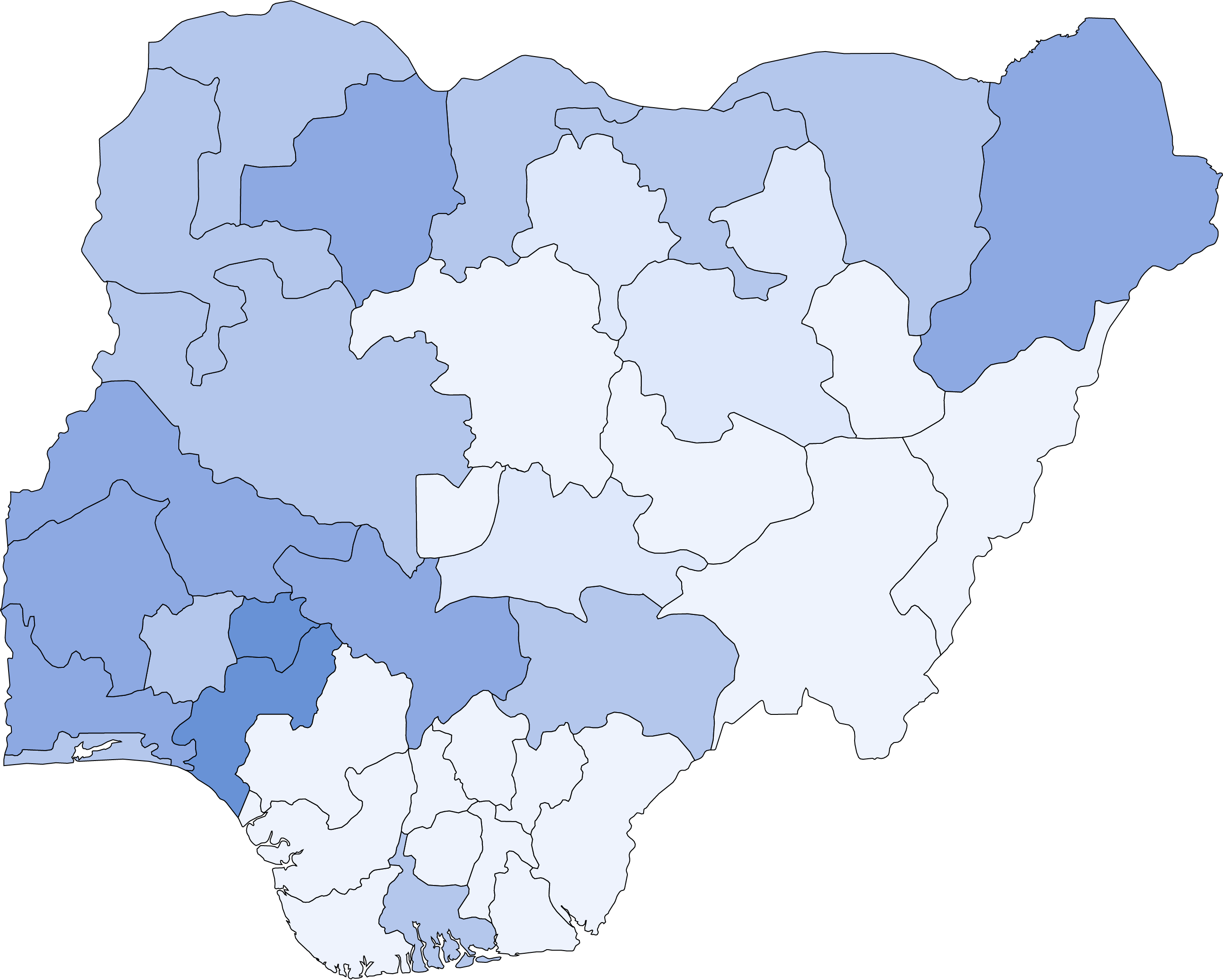
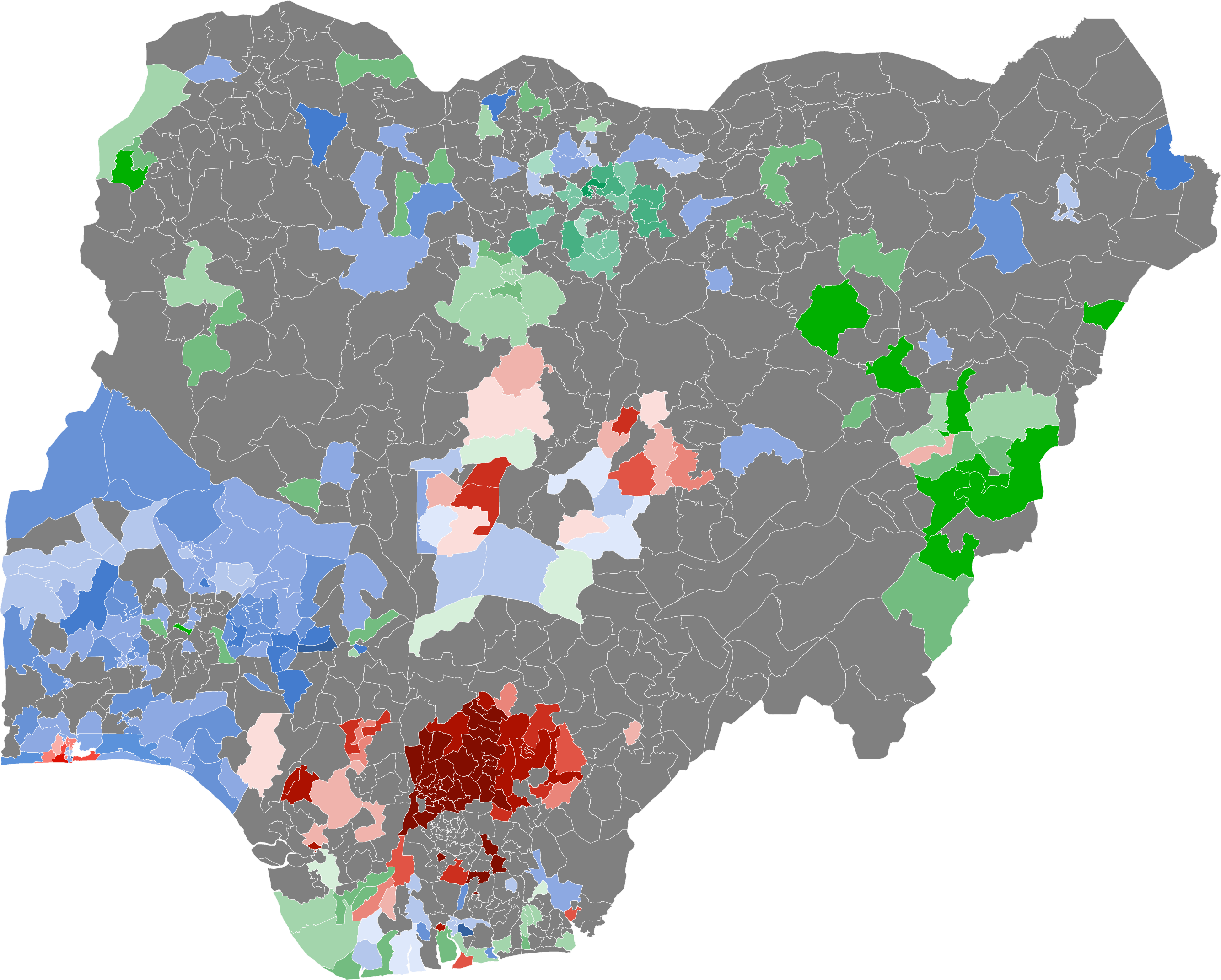
Percentage of the vote won by each major candidate by state.				LGA level breakdown
Abubakar <30% 30–40% 40–50% 50–60% 60–70%	Kwankwaso <30% 50–60%	Obi <30% 30–40% 40–50% 50–60% 60–70% 70–80% 80–90% >90%	Tinubu <30% 30–40% 40–50% 50–60% 60–70%	LGA breakdown

== Aftermath ==
The results were announced in the early hours of 1 March 2023. Bola Tinubu of the All Progressives Congress was named the president-elect in a tight election, with Atiku Abubakar and Peter Obi earning substantial votes. Tinubu said, "It (Nigeria) is the only nation we have. It is one country, and we must build together. Let's work together to put broken pieces together...This is a shining moment in the life of any man and an affirmation of our democratic existence. I represent a promise and with your support, I know that promise will be fulfilled."

Although the Independent National Electoral Commission (INEC) called the election free, fair and credible, several observers, including the European Union, said the election was not transparent. A joint observer mission of the International Republican Institute and the National Democratic Institute said, "The election fell well short of Nigerian citizens' reasonable expectations." Samson Itodo, the head of YIAGA Africa, said there were serious concerns about the elections process because major issues such as violence and technical problems had hampered public trust in the election process. The United Nations urged "all stakeholders to remain calm through the conclusion of the electoral process".

Nigeria's main opposition parties said the results of the election were "heavily doctored and manipulated" in a joint news conference. "We won this election as Labour Party, we are going to claim our mandate as Labour Party," said Yusuf Datti Baba-Ahmed, the party's vice presidential candidate. Ndi Kato, the Labour Party's presidential campaign spokesperson, said, "We are defiant. The elections were rigged."

Both the PDP and Labor Party separately filed formal petitions challenging Tinubu's victory on 22 March. On 26 May 2023, the Nigerian Supreme Court dismissed PDP's lawsuit against Tinubu and Shettima.

=== Reactions ===
==== National reactions ====
- Former president Muhammadu Buhari congratulated Tinubu, writing "elected by the people, he is the best person for the job".

==== International reactions ====
- African Union – Chairperson of the African Union Commission Moussa Faki congratulated Tinubu on 3 March, vowing to support Nigeria in "her journey to deepen democracy, good governance, sustainable development and consolidate peace, security, and stability in the country". Additionally, Faki urged "that any post-election dispute or grievance be pursued through the judicial system".
- Benin – President Patrice Talon congratulated Tinubu on Facebook on 2 March, stating that he looked forward to working together with Tinubu and furthering cooperation between Benin Republic and Nigeria.
- Chad – Transitional President Mahamat Déby congratulated Tinubu on Twitter on 1 March, stating that he looked forward to working together with Tinubu and strengthening bilateral relations.
- China – President Xi Jinping congratulated Tinubu on 5 March, noting increased cooperative relations between China and Nigeria in recent years. The brief press release echoed a similar statement by Mao Ning—a Ministry of Foreign Affairs spokesperson—at a press conference on 2 March.
- Egypt – President Abdel Fattah el-Sisi congratulated Tinubu on 4 March, also wishing him success in his administration.
- Ghana – President Nana Akufo-Addo congratulated Tinubu on Twitter on 2 March, hoping that the new administration would "deepen" the bilateral friendship between Ghana and Nigeria.
- India – Prime Minister Narendra Modi congratulated Tinubu on Twitter on 3 March, stating that he "looked forward to further strengthening India-Nigeria bilateral relations".
- Ivory Coast – President Alassane Ouattara congratulated Tinubu on Twitter on 3 March, stating that he looked forward to working together with Tinubu and strengthening bilateral relations.
- Niger – President Mohamed Bazoum congratulated Tinubu on Twitter on 3 March, labeling the election as free, democratic, and transparent.
- United Kingdom – Prime Minister Rishi Sunak congratulated Tinubu on Twitter on 1 March, stating that he would "look forward to working together to grow our security and trade ties, opening up opportunities for businesses and creating prosperity in both our countries".
- United States – In a 1 March statement, the State Department congratulated Tinubu but urged INEC to improve processes before the state elections on 11 March. The release also called on candidates and parties to use legal means to challenge results peacefully.

== See also ==
- 2020s in electoral politics
