= Aisha Salaudeen =

Nigerian multimedia journalist (born 1994)

- Born: 26 September 1994 (age 31); Jos, Plateau State, Nigeria
- Education: University of Bradford
- Occupations: Journalist, producer
- Years active: 2017–present
- Known for: Women advocacy
- Notable work: CNN Al Jazeera The Financial Times Stears Business
- Awards: The Future Awards Africa for Journalism (2020)
- Website: Nana-Aisha on Twitter

Aisha Salaudeen (born 26 September 1994) is a Nigerian multimedia journalist, feminist, producer, and writer who currently works with the CNN. In November 2020, she was awarded the Future Awards Africa Prize for Journalism for her work covering stories in Africa. She was a guest speaker at the Ake Arts and Book Festival 2020.

== Career ==
Salaudeen started her media career in 2013 when she volunteered as a presenter at the University of Bradford’s radio station. When she returned to Nigeria in 2017, she left her accounting job to pursue a career in journalism.

She got her freelancer byline at Al Jazeera and the Financial Times.

She joined Stears Business as a journalist in 2018.

=== Stears Business (2018–2019) ===
Salaudeen's earliest work at Stears were on business and culture. In July 2018, she wrote an investigative report titled: Earthquakes, lung disease, and dirt: what it feels like living in Kurata. The report was about a community battling serious environmental pollution.

In February 2019, her report titled: Single women cannot rent property in Nigeria revealed how difficult it is for unmarried Nigerian women to rent houses on their own in the country.

She left Stears in April 2019 to join the news network CNN.

=== CNN (2019–present) ===
Aisha Salaudeen is currently a digital features producer at CNN. Her first story for the CNN was about a 9-year-old boy who created over 30 video games. Since then, she has produced stories about women's trauma, inequality, abortion rights and sexual violence.

== Major works ==
- Single women cannot rent property in Nigeria (2019) for Stears Nigeria.
- This 9-year-old has built more than 30 mobile games (2019) for CNN.
- The woman risking her life to photograph the forgotten victims of war (2019) for CNN.

== International recognitions ==
Salaudeen made the YNaija 2019 New Establishment List.

In August 2020, Aisha Salaudeen made the British Vogue list of 50 Trailblazing Creatives And Young Activists From Across. In December 2020, she was named the winner of The Future Awards Africa prize for journalism.

== Awards ==
| Year | Award | Category | Result | Recipient |
|---|---|---|---|---|
| 2020 | The Future Awards Africa | Journalism | Won | Herself |
