= Chukwuemeka Nwajiuba =

Nigerian politician and lawyer

former Minister of State for Education
- President: Muhammadu Buhari
- Preceded by: Anthony Anwukah

Personal details
- Born: 20 August 1967 (age 59) Ehime Mbano-Imo State, Nigeria
- Party: All Progressives Congress
- Education: Imo State University; University of Lagos; University of Jos
- Occupation: politician lawyer

Chukwuemeka Nwajiuba // (born 20 August 1967) is a Nigerian politician and lawyer. He was the Minister of State for Education of the Federal Republic of Nigeria. from 2019 and resigned on April 28, 2022, after receiving an APC Expression of Interest and Nomination form to aspire for President of Nigeria in 2023 election donated by Project Nigeria Group. He has previously served as the Chairman of TETFund Board of Trustees.

== Early life and education ==
Nwajiuba was born on 20 August 1967 at Umuezeala Nsu in Ehime Mbano Local Government Area in Imo State, Southeast Nigeria. He completed a Bachelor of Laws (LLB) from Imo State University. He then joined the University of Lagos and completed Master of Laws (LLM) degree followed by a Doctor of Philosophy (PhD) in Law from the University of Jos. He was called to the Nigerian bar in 1989.

== Career ==
Nwajiuba started his career as a managing partner of Ayodeji C. Emeka Ibrahim &Co in 1991.

He contested for Imo governorship on the platform of All People's Party in 2003, 2007 and 2011. He was elected a member of the House of Representatives in 1999 – 2003 where he served as House of Representatives committee chairman on Land, Housing and works. He was a founding member of All Progressives Congress and Secretary of the Constitution drafting committee that produced the Constitution that gave birth to All Progressives Congress in 2013. He was the Chairman of Tertiary Education Trust Fund from 2017 to 2019.

Nwajiuba was re-elected member of the Okigwe North Federal House of Representatives in 2019 under Accord Party. He was nominated for a ministerial role and became a Minister of State for Education of the Federal Republic of Nigeria in 2019.
