= Ibrahim Bello Dauda =

Nigerian politician (born 1972)

Dr Ibrahim Bello Dauda (born 1972) is a national chieftain of All Progressives Congress. He was the national coordinator of the Buhari Support Organisations (BSO) in 2015, the umbrella campaign body for the president of Nigeria Muhammadu Buhari. and the National Secretary of the Women and Youth Presidential Campaign Team in 2019, He is a chartered accountant who also has specialty in human resource management and sustainability governance, project and risk management.

== Early life ==
He was born in Jos North, Plateau State, on 3 June, 1972. A Kanuri by tribe, and a native of Gora Town in Kwaba District of Shani Local Government Area of Borno State of Nigeria.

== Education ==
He holds a doctorate (Hon C) in Business Management.

== Career ==
Before joining the Buhari Support Organisation, he was an accountant and an administrator. He specializes in public and corporate administration. He was awarded with leadership award from African Advancement Forum in global Summit.
