= 2023 Nigerian currency crisis =

The 2023 Nigerian currency crisis was precipitated by a shortage of cash currency (the naira) and an attempt by the Nigerian government to force citizens to use a newly created government-sponsored central bank digital currency. This led to extensive street protests in mid-February 2023.

Central Bank governor Godwin Emefiele initially cited Nigerians hoarding notes in their homes as the reason for the currency redesign. However, he later claimed that it would deter counterfeiters and those paying kidnappers' ransoms, and that it was a step towards a cashless society. He also argued that it would help reduce inflation. Some analysts and politicians have said that a motive of the CBDC introduction and deprecation of the old currency was to curb vote buying, by thwarting politicians who had amassed a stockpile of naira in preparation for election day.

== See also ==
- 2023 Nigerian elections
