= Yabagi Sani =

Nigerian politician

Yabagi Yusuf Sani Jakardan Nupe

National Chairman Action Democratic Party (Nigeria)

Engineer
- Preceded by: First appoint

Personal details
- Born: 1 July 1957 (age 68) Bida, Nigeria
- Party: Action Democratic Party (Nigeria) (ADP)
- Education: Columbia University; Harvard University
- Occupation: Energy and Oils Expert; Engineer; Politician

Yabagi Yusuf Sani, known mostly as (YYSani or Jakardan Nupe) meaning Ambassador of Nupe, (born 1 July 1957) is a Nigerian politician, Energy and Crude oil expert and is the current National Chairman of The Action Democratic Party (ADP). He was a presidential candidate in the 2019 Nigerian general election.

== Background and education ==
Sani was born in Bida, his father was the title holder of Ciroman Samarin Nupe. He began his early education at East School Bida in 1961, then Technical college, Kontagora in 1970. He graduated from Harvard University and Institute of Technology, New York in 1976. He also graduated from Columbia University, New York in 1978 with B.Sc in management engineering. He also participated in the compulsory National Youth Service Corps.

== Career ==
Yabagi started as an administrative officer-depot chief in (PPMC Depot) Kano in 1980 under Nigerian National Petroleum Corporation. Sani began his political ambitions in 1991, he was also a founding member of (ANPP), and member board of trustees of All Nigeria Peoples Party (ANP). In 1999, Sani was the candidate of All Peoples Party (APP) in Niger State for the governorship election, he was also the financial secretary of the then Nigeria Liberal Convention (NLC/NRC), he was the North Central presidential coordinator of Alhaji Bashir Tofa in 1993.

In 2019, Yabagi was selected as the presidential candidate of Action Democratic Party (Nigeria) in the 2019 Nigerian general election.

In 2021, Engr. Yabagi Yusuf Sani of the Action Democratic Party (ADP) emerged as the new national chairman of IPAC, taking over from Dr Leonard Nzenwa. Mgbudem Maxwell from Accord Party (AP) was elected Deputy National Chairman of the Council, while Alhaji Yusuf Dantalle of the Allied People’s Movement (APM) emerged as the National Secretary.

He was declared as the ADP presidential standard-bearer at the Special National Convention of the party on Tuesday, May 31, 2022, in Abuja, Nigeria. The Chairman, ADP Electoral Panel, Mr. Tasiru Abdulrahman, said that Sani was chosen by consensus. He confirmed that Sani was chosen after he was screened and confirmed to have met all necessary requirements for the 2023 presidential election.

== Controversies ==
Yabagi was reported to be suspended by the national committee party secretary, Mr. James Okoroma. In an interview, he stated that he still remained the national chairman of Action Democratic People, since the secretary does not have the power to suspend him.

== Awards ==
He was honoured by a Humanitarian Award by the United Nations and collaborated with Conservative Party (UK) leaders in New York City.
