= Chichi Ojei =

Nigerian Politician

Chichi Ojei is a Nigerian politician.

== Background ==
Chichi Ojei is a Nigerian who was born in Delta, South-South Nigeria, in 1978. She got her education in Nigeria and overseas. She attended the American International School, Lagos, Nigeria, Institut Le Rosay in Rolle, Switzerland, she later obtained a bachelor's degree in business administration from the Northeastern University, USA, and also got an MBA from the Regent's Business School, London.

Before joining politics, Ojei was a finance specialist and the executive director of Nuel Ojei Holdings. Ahead of the 2023 elections, she joined the Allied People's Movement. She was endorsed as the presidential candidate of the party on August 14, 2022. During her campaigns, she expressed optimism about winning the election in the male dominated race.

Her hope of becoming the president in 2023 could, however, not be realized, as her party dropped her and adopted the presidential candidate of the People's Democratic Party (PDP), Atiku Abubakar, as its candidate.
