= Stears (company) =

Nigerian business publication

- Founder(s): Preston Ideh, Abdul Abdulrahim, Foluso Ogunlana, and Michael Famoroti
- Publisher: Stears
- Language: English
- City: Lagos, Abuja, London
- Country: Nigeria
- Website: www.stears.co

Stears is a market intelligence company for investing in Africa, with headquarters in Lagos, Abuja, and London. Initially established as a media publication called Stears Business, the company was founded in 2017 by Preston Ideh, Abdul Abdulrahim, Foluso Ogunlana, and Michael Famoroti, who met at the London School of Economics and Imperial College in the United Kingdom.

Stears has become a provider of subscription-based data collection tools and analysis services for investing in Africa.

Stears has provided bespoke content around specific issues such as market entry, country analysis, and digital economy for international organisations such as the United Nations Development Programme, the Foreign Commonwealth and Development Office, and knowledge workers. This provides data for the work of analysts, portfolio managers, researchers, and economists.

In 2022, Stears raised $3.3 million in funding from MaC Venture Capital, Serena Ventures (the investment firm of retired tennis star Serena Williams), Melo 7 Tech Partners, Omidyar Group's Laminate Fund and Cascador.
