= 2023 Nasarawa State gubernatorial election =

2023 gubernatorial election in Nasarawa State, Nigeria

- 18 March 2023
- Registered: 1,899,244
Nominee	Abdullahi Sule	David Ombugadu
Party	APC	PDP
Running mate	Emmanuel Agbadu Akabe	Yahaya Usman-Ohinoyi
Popular vote	347,209	283,016
Percentage	53.10%	43.28%
Governor before election
Abdullahi Sule
APC
Elected Governor
Abdullahi Sule
APC

The 2023 Nasarawa State gubernatorial election was held on 18 March 2023, to elect the Governor of Nasarawa State, concurrent with elections to the Nasarawa State House of Assembly as well as twenty-seven other gubernatorial elections and elections to all other state houses of assembly. The election — which was postponed from its original 11 March date — was held three weeks after the presidential election and National Assembly elections. Incumbent APC Governor Abdullahi Sule won election to a second term by a 9.8% margin of victory over PDP nominee — former House of Representatives member David Ombugadu.

The primaries, scheduled for between 4 April and 9 June 2022, resulted in Sule being renominated by the All Progressives Congress by a wide margin on 26 May while the Peoples Democratic Party nominated Ombugadu on 25 May.

On 21 March, INEC declared Sule as the victor amid considerable protests due to alleged electoral irregularities, particularly contested vote totals in two wards of Lafia. The official totals showed Sule winning about 347,000 votes (~53% of the vote) to defeat Ombugadu with just over 283,000 votes (~43% of the vote). Due to the controversies, Ombugadu rejected the results and filed a legal challenge. In October, the electoral tribunal overturned the result to award the victory to Ombugadu; however, an appeals court judgment the following month upheld Sule's win. The legal case eventually reached the Supreme Court, which upheld the election of Sule in a January 2024 judgment.

== Electoral system ==
The Governor of Nasarawa State is elected using a modified two-round system. To be elected in the first round, a candidate must receive the plurality of the vote and over 25% of the vote in at least two-thirds of state local government areas. If no candidate passes this threshold, a second round will be held between the top candidate and the next candidate to have received a plurality of votes in the highest number of local government areas.

== Background ==
Nasarawa State is a large state in the North Central with vast natural areas and a improving health sector but facing underdeveloped agriculture and intense challenges in security as the nationwide kidnapping epidemic, inter-ethnic violence, and herder–farmer clashes have all heavily affected the state. Politically, the state's 2019 elections had a significant swing towards the state APC. In federal elections, Buhari gained the state for the APC while the APC swept all senate seats by gaining two PDP-held seats. Similarly, the APC gained one PDP-held House of Representatives seat, held the governorship, and kept the majority in the House of Assembly.

Ahead of his term, Sule pledged to complete the previous administration's projects, further rural electrification, and rehabilitate transportation infrastructure. In terms of his performance, Sule was praised for providing financial autonomy to local government areas but criticized for failing to follow through on promises.

== Primary elections ==
The primaries, along with any potential challenges to primary results, were to take place between 4 April and 3 June 2022 but the deadline was extended to 9 June. The primaries, along with any potential challenges to primary results, were to take place between 4 April and 3 June 2022 but the deadline was extended to 9 June.

=== All Progressives Congress ===
In the years before the primary, the state APC underwent a small-scale dispute between two senators that used to be governor: Abdullahi Adamu and Umaru Tanko Al-Makura while Sule and Senator Godiya Akwashiki mostly stood on the sidelines but leaned towards Al-Makura. The disagreement intensified into a subtle cold war when Adamu resigned from the Senate to become APC National Chairman in March 2022 and gained extensive power over the party at-large leading to rumours that he was planning on replacing Al-Makura and Akwashiki with closer allies. If the wrangling escalated, analysts said it had the potential to impact party unity and thus the ability for effective campaigning in the general election.

On 20 April 2022, the APC National Executive Committee announced the party's schedule for gubernatorial primaries, setting its expression of interest form price at ₦10 million and nomination form price at ₦40 million with a 50% nomination form discount for candidates younger than 40 while women and candidates with disabilities get free nomination forms. Forms were to be sold from 26 April to 6 May until the deadline was later extended to 10 May then 12 May. After the submission of nomination forms by 13 May, candidates were screened by a party committee on 14 and 15 May while 16 May was the date for the screening appeal process. Ward congresses and LGA congresses were set for between 7 and 9 May to elect delegates for the primary. Candidates approved by the screening process advanced to a primary set for 26 May, in concurrence with other APC gubernatorial primaries; challenges to the result could be made the next day.

On the primary date, Sule defeated his sole opponent—Fatima Hussain Abdullahi—winning the nomination near-unanimously. In his acceptance speech, Sule thanked the delegates and Abdullahi for contesting; Abdullahi congratulated Sule and pledged her support for his general election campaign. A few weeks after the primary, Sule formed a party reconciliation committee as, despite the straightforward gubernatorial primary, the party divided over accusations that Adamu manipulated delegate lists for two senate primaries including the successful primary challenge to Akwashiki.

==== Nominated ====
- Abdullahi Sule: Governor (2019–present)
  - Running mate—Emmanuel Agbadu Akabe: Deputy Governor (2019–present)

==== Eliminated in primary ====
- Fatima Hussain Abdullahi: ex-wife of former Governor and APC National Chairman Abdullahi Adamu

==== Results ====
Candidates' vote share
1. Abdullahi Sule (99.6%)
2. Fatima Hussain Abdullahi (0.43%)

APC primary results
Party	Candidate	Votes	%
APC	Abdullahi Sule	698	99.57%
APC	Fatima Hussain Abdullahi	3	0.43%
Total votes		701	100.00%
Turnout		701	95.37%

=== People's Democratic Party ===
Analysts viewed the PDP gubernatorial primary as a contest between two major internal party groupings, the group led by former senator Solomon Ewuga and another group led by state party chairman Francis Orogu. In April 2022, the Ewuga-led group met in Abuja with the goal of consolidating behind one candidate and reportedly settled on attempting to coax former minister Labaran Maku into the party to back his candidacy; later that month, Maku did rejoin the PDP after eight years in APGA. Around the same time, the Orogu-led bloc also held a meeting to line up behind a single candidate with some sources stating that retired army general Nuhu Angbazo may have emerged as the bloc's candidate. To ensure party unity, Orogu held a meeting on 25 April with Maku, Angbazo, and David Ombugadu (the other candidate) where all three committed to working together to unseat Sule irrespective of the primary winner.

On 16 March 2022, the national PDP announced its gubernatorial primaries' schedule, setting its expression of interest form price at ₦1 million and the nomination form price at ₦20 million with a 50% discount for candidates between 25 and 30. Forms were to be sold until 1 April but the party later extended the deadline four times before reaching a final deadline of 22 April. After the submission of nomination forms by 25 April, candidates were screened by a party committee on 28 April while 2 May was the rescheduled date for the screening appeal process. Ward congresses were set for 29 April and LGA congresses were rescheduled for 10 May to elect delegates for the primary. Candidates approved by the screening process advanced to a primary set for 25 May, in concurrence with all other PDP gubernatorial primaries; challenges to the result could be made in the following days.

Early on the day of the primary, Maku suddenly withdrew from the election without a stated reason or grievance. When the primary held later that day, Ombugadu defeated Angbazo by about 10% of the delegates' votes. While Ombugadu promised to lead the party to victory, Angbazo accepted the results and affirmed the previous arrangement to work to support the party nominee. In June, Ombugadu's running mate was announced as Yahaya Usman-Ohinoyi—former House of Assembly member—at a meeting with PDP State Working Committee members in Lafia.

==== Nominated ====
- David Ombugadu: former House of Representatives member for Akwanga/Nasarawa Eggon/Wamba (2011–2019) and 2019 PDP gubernatorial nominee
  - Running mate—Yahaya Usman-Ohinoyi: former House of Assembly member

==== Eliminated in primary ====
- Nuhu Angbazo: former Army major general and son of Aren Eggon Bala Abaine Angbazo

==== Withdrew ====
- Labaran Maku: National Secretary of the All Progressives Grand Alliance (2015–2022), 2015 and 2019 APGA gubernatorial nominee, former Minister of Information (2010–2014), and former Deputy Governor (2003–2007)

==== Declined ====
- Suleiman Adokwe: former Senator for Nasarawa South (2007–2019) and former Commissioner for Information and Internal Affairs (2003–2006)
- Yusuf Agabi: 2015 PDP gubernatorial nominee
- Solomon Ewuga: 2019 PDP gubernatorial candidate, former Senator for Nasarawa North (2012–2015), former Minister of State for the Federal Capital Territory (1999–2001), and former Deputy Governor (1999)

==== Results ====
Candidates' vote share
1. David Ombugadu (54.9%)
2. Nuhu Angbazo (45.1%)

PDP primary results
Party	Candidate	Votes	%
PDP	David Ombugadu	247	54.89%
PDP	Nuhu Angbazo	203	45.11%
Total votes		450	100.00%
Turnout		450	Unknown

=== Minor parties ===
- Inusa Mohammed Anga (Accord)
  - Running mate: Murtala Aliyu
- Samuel Manga (Action Alliance)
  - Running mate: Lantana Mohammed Ozegya
- Patricia Danlami Tsakpa (Action Democratic Party)
  - Running mate: Adamu Sidi Bakyano
- Alaku Godwin William (African Democratic Congress)
  - Running mate: Rufaidah Talatu Osede
- Mohammed Suleiman Awwal (Allied Peoples Movement)
  - Running mate: Obile Augustine Otso
- Matthew Avre Ombugaku (All Progressives Grand Alliance)
  - Running mate: Baba Dauda Sarki
- Joseph Ewuga (Labour Party)
  - Running mate: Ibrahim Suleiman
- Abdullahi Yakubu Maidoya (New Nigeria Peoples Party)
  - Running mate: Adams Gwamna Nyisana
- Abubakar Sambo Musa (National Rescue Movement)
  - Running mate: Kyauta Atnadu Bawa
- Yusuf Musa Nagogo (People's Redemption Party)
  - Running mate: Okara Mathew Godiya
- Mohammed Alfa Mustapha (Social Democratic Party)
  - Running mate: Alex Ogah Ewolo Kana
- Umaru Aliyu Doma (Zenith Labour Party)
  - Running mate: Monday Sunday Abimiku

== Campaign ==
After the primaries, analysts noted the main change from the previous two gubernatorial elections: Labaran Maku not running as the APGA nominee. Maku, who obtained 29.4% in 2015 and 19.8% in 2019, left APGA in April 2022 and rejoined the PDP leading a report to say Sule may "face an uphill task [in] defeating the combined forces in [the] PDP." Further issues emerged for Sule due to the APC presidential ticket—APC nominee Bola Tinubu's selection of Kashim Shettima created a Muslim-Muslim ticket, violating an unwritten convention against same religion tickets—with pundits noting the religious diversity of Nasarawa and the opposition forming against the APC among northern Christians. The presidential ticket fomented enough internal dissent among Sule administration officials that Sule reportedly issued an ultimatum to his appointees, telling them to remain loyal to the APC or resign from their offices. To compound the internal APC dissent complication, Sule continued to face issues from the state APC leadership dispute and members aggrieved by various primary outcomes. For his part, Sule and the APC campaigned on milestones from his term with a focus on newly constructed and rehabilitated roads, upgraded health infrastructure, and the timely payment of civil servant salaries. By August, analysts continued to focus on APC infighting and its potential impact on Sule's campaign but also noted splits within oppositional candidates and their parties. The next month, pundits reiterated the potential impact of defections from the APC but also noted PDP strength in Eggon and Alago ethnicities.

Throughout the campaign, pundits focused on Nasarawa's competitiveness on the presidential level as the state's margin was about 36,000 votes in 2015 when it was won by Goodluck Jonathan (PDP) and only around 6,000 votes in 2019 when Muhammadu Buhari (APC) won it. This focus lead to intense attention on the statewide results in the 2023 presidential election; Peter Obi (LP) won the state with 35% of the vote, beating Bola Tinubu (APC) at 33% and Atiku Abubakar (PDP) at 27%. The result, along with APC senatorial defeats to the PDP and SDP, led observers to question Sule's chances in the gubernatorial election amid the losses and APC crisis. Considering that LP gubernatorial nominee Joseph Ewuga stepped down for Ombugadu on 9 March, analysts noted Ombugadu's rise and further breakdowns in intra-APC relationship.

== Conduct ==
=== Electoral timetable ===
On 26 February 2022, the Independent National Electoral Commission released the timetable, setting out key dates and deadlines for the election. Months later on 27 May 2022, INEC made a slight revision to the timetable, allowing parties extra time to conduct primaries.

- 28 February 2022 – Publication of Notice of Election
- 4 April 2022 – First day for the conduct of party primaries
- 9 June 2022 (Note: The original deadline was 3 June; however, INEC pushed it back to 9 June at the behest of parties.) – Final day for the conduct of party primaries, including the resolution of disputes arising from them
- 1 July 2022 – First day for submission of nomination forms to INEC via the online portal
- 15 July 2022 – Final day for submission of nomination forms to INEC via the online portal
- 12 October 2022 – Commencement of the official campaign period
- 16 March 2023 (Note: The original deadline was 9 March; however, INEC pushed it back to 16 March.) – Final day of the official campaign period

== General election ==
=== Results ===
2023 Nasarawa State gubernatorial election
Party	Candidate	Votes	%
A			
AA			
ADP			
APP			
AAC			
ADC			
APM			
APC			
APGA			
BP			
LP			
New Nigeria Peoples Party			
NRM			
PDP			
PRP			
SDP			
YPP			
ZLP			
Total votes			100.00%
Turnout			

=== By senatorial district ===
The results of the election by senatorial district.

Senatorial District	Abdullahi Sule APC		David Ombugadu PDP		Others		Total Valid Votes
Senatorial District	Votes	Percentage	Votes	Percentage	Votes	Percentage	Total Valid Votes
Nasarawa North Senatorial District (Note: Comprising the local government areas of Akwanga, Eggon, and Wamba.)	TBD	%	TBD	%	TBD	%	TBD
Nasarawa South Senatorial District (Note: Comprising the local government areas of Awe, Doma, Keana, Lafia and Obi.)	TBD	%	TBD	%	TBD	%	TBD
Nasarawa West Senatorial District (Note: Comprising the local government areas of Karu, Keffi, Kokona, Nasarawa and Toto.)	TBD	%	TBD	%	TBD	%	TBD
Totals	TBD	%	TBD	%	TBD	%	TBD

=== By federal constituency ===
The results of the election by federal constituency.

Federal Constituency	Abdullahi Sule APC		David Ombugadu PDP		Others		Total Valid Votes
Federal Constituency	Votes	Percentage	Votes	Percentage	Votes	Percentage	Total Valid Votes
Akwanga/Nasarawa/Eggon/Wamba Federal Constituency (Note: Comprising the local government areas of Akwanga, Eggon, and Wamba.)	TBD	%	TBD	%	TBD	%	TBD
Awe/Doma/Keana Federal Constituency (Note: Comprising the local government areas of Awe, Doma, and Keana.)	TBD	%	TBD	%	TBD	%	TBD
Keffi/Karu/Kokona Federal Constituency (Note: Comprising the local government areas of Karu, Keffi, and Kokona.)	TBD	%	TBD	%	TBD	%	TBD
Lafia/Obi Federal Constituency (Note: Comprising the local government areas of Lafia and Obi.)	TBD	%	TBD	%	TBD	%	TBD
Nassarawa/Toto Federal Constituency (Note: Comprising the local government areas of Nasarawa and Toto.)	TBD	%	TBD	%	TBD	%	TBD
Totals	TBD	%	TBD	%	TBD	%	TBD

=== By local government area ===
The results of the election by local government area.

LGA	Abdullahi Sule APC		David Ombugadu PDP		Others		Total Valid Votes	Turnout Percentage
LGA	Votes	Percentage	Votes	Percentage	Votes	Percentage	Total Valid Votes	Turnout Percentage
Akwanga	TBD	%	TBD	%	TBD	%	TBD	%
Awe	TBD	%	TBD	%	TBD	%	TBD	%
Doma	TBD	%	TBD	%	TBD	%	TBD	%
Eggon	TBD	%	TBD	%	TBD	%	TBD	%
Karu	TBD	%	TBD	%	TBD	%	TBD	%
Keana	TBD	%	TBD	%	TBD	%	TBD	%
Keffi	TBD	%	TBD	%	TBD	%	TBD	%
Kokona	TBD	%	TBD	%	TBD	%	TBD	%
Lafia	TBD	%	TBD	%	TBD	%	TBD	%
Nasarawa	TBD	%	TBD	%	TBD	%	TBD	%
Obi	TBD	%	TBD	%	TBD	%	TBD	%
Toto	TBD	%	TBD	%	TBD	%	TBD	%
Wamba	TBD	%	TBD	%	TBD	%	TBD	%
Totals	TBD	%	TBD	%	TBD	%	TBD	%

== See also ==
- 2023 Nigerian elections
- 2023 Nigerian gubernatorial elections
