= 2023 Nigerian Senate elections in Nasarawa State =

2023 Senate elections in Nasarawa

- 25 February 2023

All 3 Nasarawa State seats in the Senate of Nigeria
	Majority party	Minority party
Party	APC	SDP
Last election	3	0
Seats before	1	1
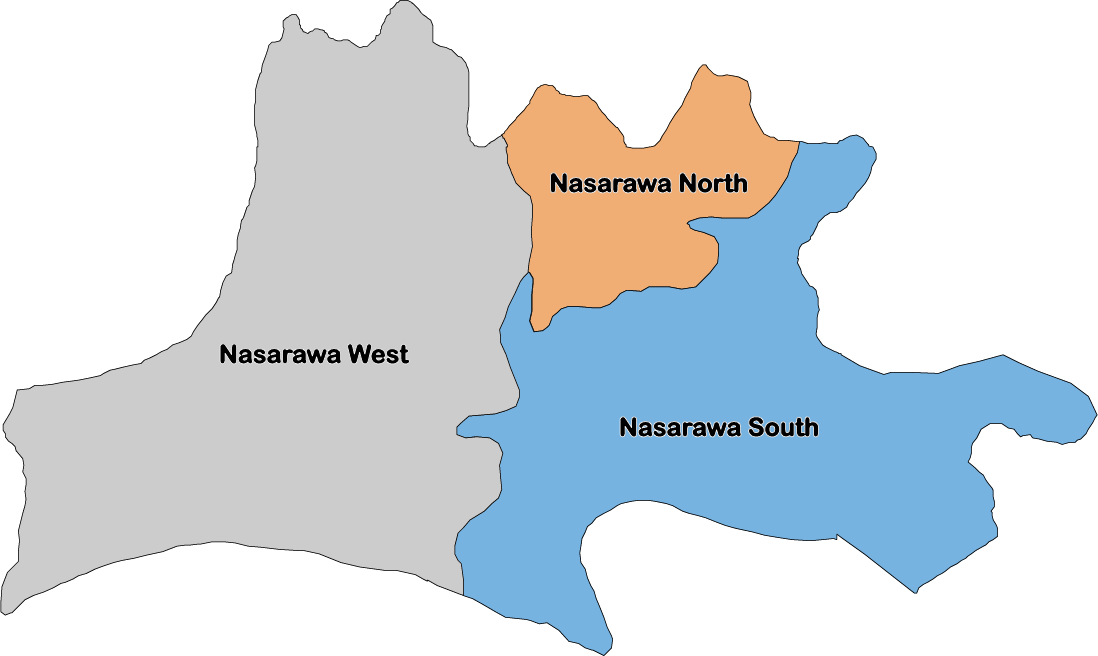
- APC incumbent running for re-election SDP incumbent running for re-election Vacant

The 2023 Nigerian Senate elections in Nasarawa State will be held on 25 February 2023, to elect the 3 federal Senators from Nasarawa State, one from each of the state's three senatorial districts. The elections will coincide with the 2023 presidential election, as well as other elections to the Senate and elections to the House of Representatives; with state elections being held two weeks later. Primaries were held between 4 April and 9 June 2022.

== Background ==
In the previous Senate elections, only one of the three incumbent senators were returned as Abdullahi Adamu (APC-West) was re-elected while Philip Aruwa Gyunka (PDP-North) retired and Suleiman Adokwe (PDP-South) was defeated. Godiya Akwashiki gained the open North district for the APC with 41.2% of the vote while APC challenger Umaru Tanko Al-Makura unseated Adokwe with 49.5%; in the western seat, Adamu was re-elected with 49.6%. These results were a part of the continuation of the Nasarawa APC's slight advantage as the party won three of five House of Representatives seats, held the governorship along with its majority in the state House of Assembly, and Buhari narrowly won the state in the presidential election.

During the 2019–2023 term, Adamu and Al-Makura both ran for APC National Chairman in 2022 with Al-Makura withdrawing right before Adamu was affirmed to the office. After taking office as party chair, Adamu resigned from the Senate in April 2022 in a move that left the West district open for the remainder of the term. For Akwashiki, he defected from the APC to the SDP in July 2022 to obtain the party's senatorial nomination for his re-election campaign.

== Overview ==
Affiliation	Party				Total
Affiliation	APC	SDP	PDP	Vacant	Total
Previous Election	3	0	0	0	3
Before Election	1	1	0	1 (Note: The seat of Nasarawa West is vacant due to the April 2022 resignation of Senator Abdullahi Adamu.)	3
After Election	0	2	1	0	3

== Summary ==
District	Incumbent		Results	
District	Incumbent	Party	Status	Candidates
Nasarawa North	Godiya Akwashiki	SDP (Note: This senator was elected as a member of the APC but switched to SDP during their term.)	Incumbent withdrew from primary (Note: Senator defected to new party after withdrawing from or losing their former party's primary.); Incumbent re-elected under nomination of new party	▌Danladi Halilu Envulu'Anza (APC); ▌Nathaniel Obin Aboki (PDP); ▌ ✓ Godiya Akwashiki (SDP)
Nasarawa South	Umaru Tanko Al-Makura	APC	Incumbent lost re-election New member elected PDP gain	▌Umaru Tanko Al-Makura (APC); ▌ ✓ Mohammed Ogoshi Onawo (PDP)
Nasarawa West	Vacant		New member elected SDP gain	▌TBD (APC); ▌Umar Galadima (PDP); ▌ ✓ Ahmed Aliyu Wadada (SDP)

== Nasarawa North ==
2023 Nasarawa North Senatorial District election
- 25 February 2023
Nominee	Danladi Halilu Envulu'Anza	Nathaniel Obin Aboki	Godiya Akwashiki
Party	APC	PDP	SDP
Senator before election
Godiya Akwashiki
SDP
Elected Senator
TBD

The Nasarawa North Senatorial District covers the local government areas of Akwanga, Eggon, and Wamba. The incumbent Godiya Akwashiki (SDP) was elected with 41.2% of the vote in 2019 as a member of the APC; he defected to the SDP in July 2022. He is running for re-election.

=== Primary elections ===
==== All Progressives Congress ====
On 20 April 2022, the APC National Executive Committee announced the party's schedule for senatorial primaries, setting its expression of interest form price at ₦3 million and nomination form price at ₦17 million with a 50% discount for candidates younger than 40 while women and candidates with disabilities get free nomination forms. Forms were to be sold from 26 April to 6 May until the deadline was later extended to 10 May then 12 May. After the submission of nomination forms by 13 May, candidates were screened by a party committee on 14 and 15 May while 18 May was the date for the screening appeal process. Ward congresses and LGA congresses were set for 16 and 17 May to elect delegates for the primary. Candidates approved by the screening process advanced to a primary set for 27 May, in concurrence with other APC senatorial primaries; challenges to the result could be made on 28 May.

In the years before the primary, the state APC underwent a small-scale dispute between two senators that used to be governor: Abdullahi Adamu and Umaru Tanko Al-Makura while Governor Abdullahi Sule and Akwashiki mostly stood on the sidelines but leaned towards Al-Makura. The disagreement intensified into a subtle cold war when Adamu resigned from the Senate to become APC National Chairman in March 2022 and gained extensive power over the party at-large leading to rumours that he was planning on replacing Al-Makura and Akwashiki with closer allies. Although Al-Makura ended up unopposed in his primary, Akwashiki was targeted as Danladi Halilu Envulu'Anza announced his candidacy. Akwashiki and Envulu'Anza were longtime political rivals and their dispute had only escalated in 2019 when Envulu'Anza and his associates assaulted Akwashiki for his alleged attempt to woo Envulu'Anza's wife. Pundits noted Adamu's open support for Envulu'Anza and categorized the primary as a proxy battle between Adamu and Al-Makura.

In the days before the primary, reports of delegate list manipulation by Adamu in favor of Envulu'Anza led to protests within the party along with a statement from the state party chairman requesting the national secretariat to refrain from further meddling. In the wake of the reports, Akwashiki announced his withdrawal from the primary on 29 May. In the primary, Envulu'Anza easily won the nomination as journalists noted that the manipulated "Abuja list" of delegates was used to determine eligible delegates. The next month, Akwashiki defected to the SDP to obtain its nomination.

APC primary results
Party	Candidate	Votes	%
APC	Danladi Halilu Envulu'Anza	105	83.33%
APC	Godiya Akwashiki (withdrawn)	21	16.67%
Total votes		126	100.00%
Turnout		Unknown	100.00%

==== People's Democratic Party ====
On 16 March 2022, the national PDP announced its senatorial primary timetable, setting its expression of interest form price at ₦1 million and the nomination form price at ₦20 million with a 50% discount for candidates between 25 and 30. Forms were to be sold until 1 April but the party later extended the deadline four times before reaching a final deadline of 22 April. After the submission of nomination forms by 25 April, candidates were screened by a party committee on 27 April while 2 May was the rescheduled date for the screening appeal process. Ward congresses were set for 29 April and LGA congresses were rescheduled for 10 May to elect delegates for the primary. Candidates approved by the screening process advanced to a primary set for 23 May, in concurrence with other PDP senatorial primaries but due to often violently enforced Monday stay-at-home orders by separatists, southeastern state parties held their primaries on 24 May; challenges to the result could be made on 25 May.

In the PDP primary, Nathaniel Obin Aboki—a businessman—was nominated with just under a majority of the delegates' votes at 46.3%.

PDP primary results
Party	Candidate	Votes	%
PDP	Nathaniel Obin Aboki	50	46.30%
PDP	Yusuf Alfa	32	29.63%
PDP	Ahmed Steve Alaku	14	12.96%
PDP	Joel Adagadzu	9	8.33%
PDP	Nathaniel Aya Akwashiki	3	2.78%
PDP	Yakubu Mama	0	0.00%
Total votes		108	100.00%

=== Campaign ===
After Akwashiki's decampment, pundits reiterated the strength of Envulu'Anza's candidacy but noted that the district's former APC base had split between him and Akwashiki in the SDP. The observation was in the context of wider infighting within the Nasarawa APC throughout the post-primary period. In campaign analysis from December 2022, The Nation labeled Akwashiki as the frontrunner due to his crossover support from APC groups and Aboki's weak grassroots support.

=== General election ===
==== Results ====
2023 Nasarawa North Senatorial District election
Party	Candidate	Votes	%
A	Araneshri Paul John		
ADC	Charity Ajagabogo		
APC	Danladi Halilu Envulu'Anza		
APGA	Alfa Tsenya Yusufu		
LP	Musa Wen Ibrahim		
NRM	Yohanna Abimiku		
New Nigeria Peoples Party	John Masgiel Danboyi		
PRP	Ayuba Wakayi Umar		
PDP	Nathaniel Obin Aboki		
SDP	Godiya Akwashiki		
YPP	Usman Yohana		
ZLP	John Kyune Umaru		
Total votes			100.00%
Invalid or blank votes			N/A
Turnout			

== Nasarawa South ==
2023 Nasarawa South Senatorial District election
- 25 February 2023
Nominee	Umaru Tanko Al-Makura	Mohammed Ogoshi Onawo
Party	APC	PDP
Senator before election
Umaru Tanko Al-Makura
APC
Elected Senator
TBD

The Nasarawa South Senatorial District covers the local government areas of Awe, Doma, Keana, Lafia and Obi. The incumbent Umaru Tanko Al-Makura (APC), who was elected with 49.5% of the vote in 2019, is seeking re-election.

=== Primary elections ===
==== All Progressives Congress ====
On 20 April 2022, the APC National Executive Committee announced the party's schedule for senatorial primaries, setting its expression of interest form price at ₦3 million and nomination form price at ₦17 million with a 50% discount for candidates younger than 40 while women and candidates with disabilities get free nomination forms. Forms were to be sold from 26 April to 6 May until the deadline was later extended to 10 May then 12 May. After the submission of nomination forms by 13 May, candidates were screened by a party committee on 14 and 15 May while 18 May was the date for the screening appeal process. Ward congresses and LGA congresses were set for 16 and 17 May to elect delegates for the primary. Candidates approved by the screening process advanced to a primary set for 27 May, in concurrence with other APC senatorial primaries; challenges to the result could be made on 28 May.

In the years before the primary, the state APC underwent a dispute between Senator Abdullahi Adamu and Al-Makura; the disagreement intensified into a when Adamu became APC National Chairman in March 2022 and gained extensive power over the party at-large leading to rumours that he was planning on replacing Al-Makura with a closer ally. However, only Al-Makura was a candidate by the primary date and he was renominated via affirmation in Lafia. In his post-primary remarks, Al-Makura pledged loyalty to the APC and thanked delegates.

==== People's Democratic Party ====
On 16 March 2022, the national PDP announced its senatorial primary timetable, setting its expression of interest form price at ₦1 million and the nomination form price at ₦20 million with a 50% discount for candidates between 25 and 30. Forms were to be sold until 1 April but the party later extended the deadline four times before reaching a final deadline of 22 April. After the submission of nomination forms by 25 April, candidates were screened by a party committee on 27 April while 2 May was the rescheduled date for the screening appeal process. Ward congresses were set for 29 April and LGA congresses were rescheduled for 10 May to elect delegates for the primary. Candidates approved by the screening process advanced to a primary set for 23 May, in concurrence with other PDP senatorial primaries but due to often violently enforced Monday stay-at-home orders by separatists, southeastern state parties held their primaries on 24 May; challenges to the result could be made on 25 May.

=== Campaign ===
In campaign analysis from December 2022, The Nation reporting noted that Onawo is of the larger ethnic Alago community and Al-Makura is of the smaller Gwandara ethnicity, but also categorized the election as one of few in the state to not appear to be dominated by ethnicity-based support patterns. Overall, the newspaper labeled the race as a "50/50" between Onawo and Al-Makura while noting the potential effects of Musa Abdullahi (NNPP) and Adamu Muazu Allu (SDP).

=== General election ===
==== Results ====
2023 Nasarawa South Senatorial District election
Party	Candidate	Votes	%
A	Stephen Kyari		
ADC	Abubakar Musa		
APC	Umaru Tanko Al-Makura		
LP	Bawa Elayo Odela		
NRM	Musa Aliyu Idris		
New Nigeria Peoples Party	Musa Agwai Abdullahi		
PDP	Mohammed Ogoshi Onawo		
SDP	Adamu Muazu Allu		
ZLP	Cletus Ogah		
Total votes			100.00%
Invalid or blank votes			N/A
Turnout			

== Nasarawa West ==
2023 Nasarawa West Senatorial District election
- 25 February 2023
Nominee	TBD	Umar Galadima	Ahmed Aliyu Wadada
Party	APC	PDP	SDP
Senator before election
Vacant
Elected Senator
TBD

The Nasarawa West Senatorial District covers the local government areas of Karu, Keffi, Kokona, Nasarawa and Toto. The seat is vacant as Senator Abdullahi Adamu (APC), who was re-elected with 49.6% of the vote in 2019, resigned from the Senate on 12 April 2022 to focus on his new position as the APC National Chairman. Despite a constitutional stipulation that by-elections must be held after a vacancy, INEC did not schedule a by-election amid its preparations for prescheduled elections in 2022 and 2023.

=== Primary elections ===
==== All Progressives Congress ====
On 20 April 2022, the APC National Executive Committee announced the party's schedule for senatorial primaries, setting its expression of interest form price at ₦3 million and nomination form price at ₦17 million with a 50% discount for candidates younger than 40 while women and candidates with disabilities get free nomination forms. Forms were to be sold from 26 April to 6 May until the deadline was later extended to 10 May then 12 May. After the submission of nomination forms by 13 May, candidates were screened by a party committee on 14 and 15 May while 18 May was the date for the screening appeal process. Ward congresses and LGA congresses were set for 16 and 17 May to elect delegates for the primary. Candidates approved by the screening process advanced to a primary set for 27 May, in concurrence with other APC senatorial primaries; challenges to the result could be made on 28 May.

Like the Nasarawa North APC primary, in the days before the primary, reports of delegate list manipulation by Adamu led to protests within the party along with a statement from the state party chairman requesting the national secretariat to refrain from further meddling. Adamu backed Shehu Tukur over former MHR Ahmed Wadada or Labaran Magaji, leading Wadada to withdraw and leave the party to obtain the SDP nomination while Magaji continued onto the APC primary. On the primary date, the exercise was disrupted and later postponed due to a group of Magaji-supporting protesters decrying the altered delegate list. On 6 June, a new primary was conducted at the Nasarawa State University in Keffi that resulted in a Tukur victory after results showed him defeating Magaji by a significant margin. However, Magaji immediately rejected the results and launched a legal challenge based on the delegate list scandal amid further party crisis. In early November, the lawsuit succeeded as a Federal High Court ruling annulled the APC primary and ordered the party to conduct a new primary with the original delegate list. Although the state APC set the new primary date as 12 November, Tukur appealed the High Court ruling leading the rerun to be postponed.

Annulled primary results

APC primary results
Party	Candidate	Votes	%
APC	~~Shehu Tukur~~	179	61.09%
APC	~~Labaran Magaji~~	114	38.91%
Total votes		293	100.00%
Invalid or blank votes		0	N/A
Turnout		293	99.66%

==== People's Democratic Party ====
On 16 March 2022, the national PDP announced its senatorial primary timetable, setting its expression of interest form price at ₦1 million and the nomination form price at ₦20 million with a 50% discount for candidates between 25 and 30. Forms were to be sold until 1 April but the party later extended the deadline four times before reaching a final deadline of 22 April. After the submission of nomination forms by 25 April, candidates were screened by a party committee on 27 April while 2 May was the rescheduled date for the screening appeal process. Ward congresses were set for 29 April and LGA congresses were rescheduled for 10 May to elect delegates for the primary. Candidates approved by the screening process advanced to a primary set for 23 May, in concurrence with other PDP senatorial primaries but due to often violently enforced Monday stay-at-home orders by separatists, southeastern state parties held their primaries on 24 May; challenges to the result could be made on 25 May.

On the primary date, four candidates contested an indirect primary in Keffi that ended with Umar Galadima winning the nomination after results showed him defeating Bala Ahmed Aliyu by a significant margin. In his acceptance speech, Galadima thanked delegates and asked his former opponents to work with him.

PDP primary results
Party	Candidate	Votes	%
PDP	Umar Galadima	152	83.98%
PDP	Bala Ahmed Aliyu	17	9.39%
PDP	Angama Weibey Maikasuwa	12	6.63%
PDP	Samuel Avreso	0	0.00%
Total votes		181	100.00%
Invalid or blank votes		0	N/A
Turnout		181	99.45%

=== Campaign ===
In campaign analysis from December 2022, The Nation reporting labeled Wadada (SDP) as the frontrunner due to his crossover support from APC groups and Galadima's weak grassroots support. The next month, OrderPaper Nigeria also noted the APC primary crisis as a key weakness of its campaigning but Wadada's weakness was the relatively smaller size of the SDP.

=== General election ===
==== Results ====
2023 Nasarawa West Senatorial District election
Party	Candidate	Votes	%
ADC	Justice Jato		
APC	TBD		
LP	Tongurma Bala		
New Nigeria Peoples Party	Kabiru Wakili		
PDP	Umar Galadima		
SDP	Ahmed Aliyu Wadada		
ZLP	Sani Shehu Jibril		
Total votes			100.00%
Invalid or blank votes			N/A
Turnout			

== See also ==
- 2023 Nigerian Senate election
- 2023 Nigerian elections
