= 2023 Nigerian presidential election in Nasarawa State =

- 25 February 2023
- Registered: 1,899,244
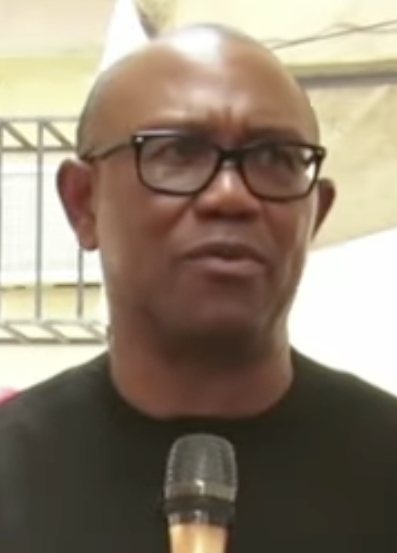

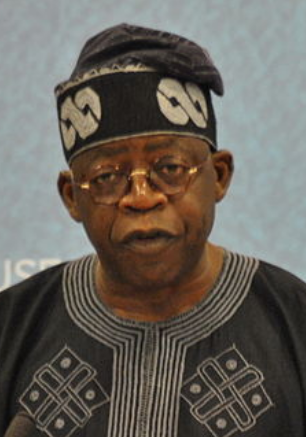

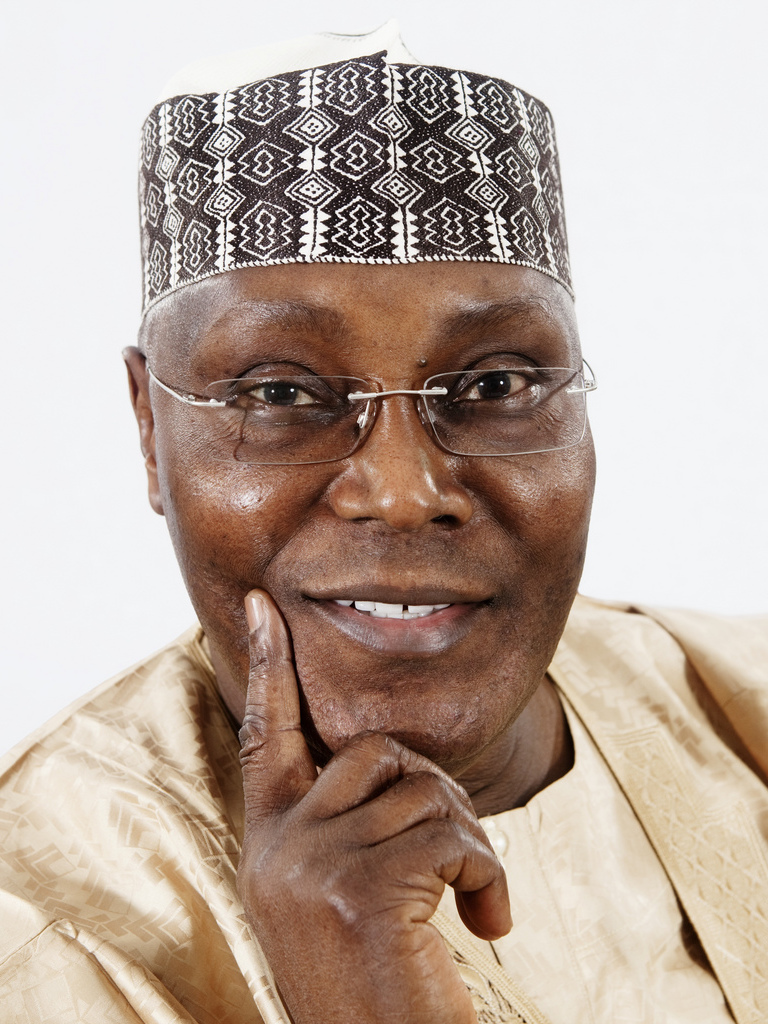
Nominee	Peter Obi	Bola Tinubu
Party	LP	APC
Home state	Anambra	Lagos
Running mate	Yusuf Datti Baba-Ahmed	Kashim Shettima
Popular vote	191,361	172,922
Percentage	35.40%	31.99%
Nominee	Atiku Abubakar	Rabiu Kwankwaso
Party	PDP	New Nigeria Peoples Party
Home state	Adamawa	Kano
Running mate	Ifeanyi Okowa	Isaac Idahosa
Popular vote	147,093	12,715
Percentage	27.21%	2.35%
President before election
Muhammadu Buhari
APC
Elected President
TBD

The 2023 Nigerian presidential election in Nasarawa State was held on 25 February 2023 as part of the nationwide 2023 Nigerian presidential election to elect the president and vice president of Nigeria. Other federal elections, including elections to the House of Representatives and the Senate, will also be held on the same date while state elections will be held two weeks afterward on 11 March.

== Background ==
Nasarawa State is a large state in the North Central with vast natural areas and a improving health sector but facing underdeveloped agriculture and intense challenges in security as the nationwide kidnapping epidemic, inter-ethnic violence, and herder–farmer clashes have all heavily affected the state. Politically, the state's 2019 elections had a significant swing towards the state APC. In federal elections, Buhari won the state by just 1% while the APC swept all senate seats by gaining two PDP-held seats. Similarly, the APC gained one PDP-held House of Representatives seat, held the governorship, and kept the majority in the House of Assembly.

== Polling ==
Polling organisation/client	Fieldwork date	Sample size					Others	Undecided	Undisclosed	Not voting
Polling organisation/client	Fieldwork date	Sample size	Tinubu APC	Obi LP	Kwankwaso NNPP	Abubakar PDP	Others	Undecided	Undisclosed	Not voting
BantuPage	December 2022	N/A	10%	51%	2%	15%	–	14%	5%	4%
Nextier (Nasarawa crosstabs of national poll)	27 January 2023	N/A	28.2%	35.9%	–	30.8%	–	5.1%	–	–
SBM Intelligence for EiE (Nasarawa crosstabs of national poll)	22 January-6 February 2023	N/A	6%	43%	4%	14%	–	33%	–	–
LAMECON (Nasarawa State Election Opinion Poll)	5 October - 4 Dec 2022	1027	18.1%	42.6%	10.3%	28.5%	0.4%	-	-	

== Projections ==
Source	Projection		As of
Africa Elects (Note: Africa Elects projections predict the likelihood of a candidate winning a state by categorizing a state as "Safe" for exceedingly likely, "Likely" for somewhat likely, and "Lean" for least likely. If no clear determination could be made, states are categorized as "tossups".)	Tossup		24 February 2023
Dataphyte (Note: Dataphyte projections predict candidates' projected votal shares in each state.)
Dataphyte	Tinubu:	37.54%	11 February 2023
Dataphyte	Obi:	21.11%	11 February 2023
Dataphyte	Abubakar:	23.70%	11 February 2023
Dataphyte	Others:	17.65%	11 February 2023
Enough is Enough- SBM Intelligence (Note: EiE-SBM projections predict which candidates will win states.)	Obi		17 February 2023
SBM Intelligence (Note: SBM projections predict which candidates will win states or, if no determination could be made, categorizes states as "Too close to call" (TCC).)	Tinubu		15 December 2022
ThisDay (Note: ThisDay projections predict candidates' projected votal shares in each state.)
ThisDay	Tinubu:	30%	27 December 2022
ThisDay	Obi:	25%	27 December 2022
ThisDay	Kwankwaso:	10%	27 December 2022
ThisDay	Abubakar:	25%	27 December 2022
ThisDay	Others/Undecided:	10%	27 December 2022
The Nation (Note: The Nation projections predict which candidates will win states or, if no determination could be made, categorizes states as "Battlegrounds.")	Tinubu		12-19 February 2023

== General election ==
=== Results ===
2023 Nigerian presidential election in Nasarawa State
Party	Candidate	Votes	%
A	Christopher Imumolen		
AA	Hamza al-Mustapha		
ADP	Yabagi Sani		
APP	Osita Nnadi		
AAC	Omoyele Sowore		
ADC	Dumebi Kachikwu		
APC	Bola Tinubu		
APGA	Peter Umeadi		
APM	Princess Chichi Ojei		
BP	Sunday Adenuga		
LP	Peter Obi		
NRM	Felix Johnson Osakwe		
New Nigeria Peoples Party	Rabiu Kwankwaso		
PRP	Kola Abiola		
PDP	Atiku Abubakar		
SDP	Adewole Adebayo		
YPP	Malik Ado-Ibrahim		
ZLP	Dan Nwanyanwu		
Total votes			100.00%
Invalid or blank votes			N/A
Turnout			

==== By senatorial district ====
The results of the election by senatorial district.

Senatorial District	Bola Tinubu APC		Atiku Abubakar PDP		Peter Obi LP		Rabiu Kwankwaso NNPP		Others		Total valid votes
Senatorial District	Votes	%	Votes	%	Votes	%	Votes	%	Votes	%	Total valid votes
Nasarawa North Senatorial District (Note: Comprising the local government areas of Akwanga, Eggon, and Wamba.)	TBD	%	TBD	%	TBD	%	TBD	%	TBD	%	TBD
Nasarawa South Senatorial District (Note: Comprising the local government areas of Awe, Doma, Keana, Lafia and Obi.)	TBD	%	TBD	%	TBD	%	TBD	%	TBD	%	TBD
Nasarawa West Senatorial District (Note: Comprising the local government areas of Karu, Keffi, Kokona, Nasarawa and Toto.)	TBD	%	TBD	%	TBD	%	TBD	%	TBD	%	TBD
Totals	TBD	%	TBD	%	TBD	%	TBD	%	TBD	%	TBD

==== By federal constituency ====
The results of the election by federal constituency.

Federal Constituency	Bola Tinubu APC		Atiku Abubakar PDP		Peter Obi LP		Rabiu Kwankwaso NNPP		Others		Total valid votes
Federal Constituency	Votes	%	Votes	%	Votes	%	Votes	%	Votes	%	Total valid votes
Akwanga/Nasarawa/Eggon/Wamba Federal Constituency (Note: Comprising the local government areas of Akwanga, Eggon, and Wamba.)	TBD	%	TBD	%	TBD	%	TBD	%	TBD	%	TBD
Awe/Doma/Keana Federal Constituency (Note: Comprising the local government areas of Awe, Doma, and Keana.)	TBD	%	TBD	%	TBD	%	TBD	%	TBD	%	TBD
Keffi/Karu/Kokona Federal Constituency (Note: Comprising the local government areas of Karu, Keffi, and Kokona.)	TBD	%	TBD	%	TBD	%	TBD	%	TBD	%	TBD
Lafia/Obi Federal Constituency (Note: Comprising the local government areas of Lafia and Obi.)	TBD	%	TBD	%	TBD	%	TBD	%	TBD	%	TBD
Nassarawa/Toto Federal Constituency (Note: Comprising the local government areas of Nasarawa and Toto.)	TBD	%	TBD	%	TBD	%	TBD	%	TBD	%	TBD
Totals	TBD	%	TBD	%	TBD	%	TBD	%	TBD	%	TBD

==== By local government area ====
The results of the election by local government area.

Local government area	Bola Tinubu APC		Atiku Abubakar PDP		Peter Obi LP		Rabiu Kwankwaso NNPP		Others		Total valid votes	Turnout (%)
Local government area	Votes	%	Votes	%	Votes	%	Votes	%	Votes	%	Total valid votes	Turnout (%)
Akwanga	TBD	%	TBD	%	TBD	%	TBD	%	TBD	%	TBD	%
Awe	TBD	%	TBD	%	TBD	%	TBD	%	TBD	%	TBD	%
Doma	TBD	%	TBD	%	TBD	%	TBD	%	TBD	%	TBD	%
Eggon	TBD	%	TBD	%	TBD	%	TBD	%	TBD	%	TBD	%
Karu	TBD	%	TBD	%	TBD	%	TBD	%	TBD	%	TBD	%
Keana	TBD	%	TBD	%	TBD	%	TBD	%	TBD	%	TBD	%
Keffi	TBD	%	TBD	%	TBD	%	TBD	%	TBD	%	TBD	%
Kokona	TBD	%	TBD	%	TBD	%	TBD	%	TBD	%	TBD	%
Lafia	TBD	%	TBD	%	TBD	%	TBD	%	TBD	%	TBD	%
Nasarawa	TBD	%	TBD	%	TBD	%	TBD	%	TBD	%	TBD	%
Obi	TBD	%	TBD	%	TBD	%	TBD	%	TBD	%	TBD	%
Toto	TBD	%	TBD	%	TBD	%	TBD	%	TBD	%	TBD	%
Wamba	TBD	%	TBD	%	TBD	%	TBD	%	TBD	%	TBD	%
Totals	TBD	%	TBD	%	TBD	%	TBD	%	TBD	%	TBD	%

== See also ==
- 2023 Nasarawa State elections
- 2023 Nigerian presidential election
