= 2019 Nasarawa State gubernatorial election =

2019 gubernatorial election in Nasarawa State, Nigeria

- March 9, 2019
- Turnout: 42.12%
		PDP	APGA
Nominee	Abdullahi Sule	David Ombugadu	Labaran Maku
Party	APC	PDP	APGA
Running mate	Emmanuel Akabe	Ogoshi Onawo
Popular vote	327,229	184,281	132,784
Percentage	48.78%	27.47%	19.79%
Governor before election
Umaru Tanko Al-Makura
APC
Elected Governor
Abdullahi Sule
APC

The 2019 Nasarawa State gubernatorial election occurred on March 9, 2019, the APC nominee Abdullahi Sule won the election, defeating David Ombugadu of the PDP.

Abdullahi Sule emerged APC gubernatorial candidate after scoring 926 votes and defeating his closest rival, Ahmed Wadada Aliyu, who received 519 votes. He picked Emmanuel Akabe as his running mate. David Ombugadu was the PDP candidate with Ogoshi Onawo as his running mate. Labaran Maku was the APGA candidate, while Umar Aliyu Doma stood for ZLP. 29 candidates contested in the election.

== Electoral system ==
The Governor of Nasarawa State is elected using the plurality voting system.

== Primary election ==
=== APC primary ===
The APC primary election was held on September 28, 2018. Abdullahi Sule won the primary election polling 926 votes against 10 other candidates. His closest rival was Aliyu Wadada, a house of representatives member in the state who came second with 519 votes, while Silas Ali Agara, the incumbent governor in the state came third with 352 votes.

=== Candidates ===
- Party nominee: Abdullahi Sule: GMD of Dangote Sugar Company
- Running mate: Emmanuel Akabe: former commissioner of health, Nasarawa State
- Aliyu Wadada: House of Representatives member
- Silas Ali Agara: incumbent deputy governor, Nasarawa State
- Danladi Envu-luanza
- Ibrahim Jafar
- Zakari Idde
- Dauda Kigbu
- Shehu Tukur
- Maikaya Mohammed
- James Agbazon
- Hassan Liman

=== PDP primary ===
The PDP primary election was held on September 30, 2018. David Ombugadu won the primary election polling 745 votes against 3 other candidates. His closest rival was Solomon Ewuga, a former senator who came second with 519 votes, Philip Gyunka, a serving senator came third with 123 votes, while Dameshi Luka, a former deputy governor polled 18 votes.

=== Candidates ===
- Party nominee: David Ombugadu: Serving member of the house of representatives
- Running mate: Ogoshi Onawo: Serving member of the federal house of representatives
- Solomon Ewuga
- Philip Gyunka
- Dameshi Luka

== Results ==
A total number of 29 candidates registered with the Independent National Electoral Commission to contest in the election.

The total number of registered voters in the state was 1,617,786 while 686,303 voters were accredited. Total number of votes cast was 681,400, while number of valid votes was 670,879. Rejected votes were 10,521.

Candidate	Party	Votes	%
Abdullahi Sule	All Progressives Congress	327,229	48.78
David Ombugadu	People's Democratic Party	184,281	27.47
Labaran Maku	All Progressives Grand Alliance	132,784	19.79
Ibio Umar Aliyu Doma	Zenith Labour Party	13,307	1.98
Ishaq Ahmed Kana	Social Democratic Party	7,442	1.11
Suleiman Umaru Ajaja	Action Democratic Party	1,355	0.20
Zaggi Rabo Zakka	African Democratic Congress	1,319	0.20
Mustapha Momammed Alfa	Allied Peoples Movement	773	0.12
Tanko Malam	Progressive Peoples Alliance	679	0.10
Animiku Anthony Kukumah	All Grassroots Alliance	526	0.08
Aliyu Danjuma Dogara	Nigeria For Democracy	258	0.04
Mohammed Ahmadu Adamu	Peoples Party Of Nigeria	186	0.03
Ombugadu Victor	Advanced Congress of Democrats	97	0.01
Sale Yahaya Alaji	Providence Peoples Congress	85	0.01
Anjugu Abimku Moses	Justice Must Prevail Party	82	0.01
Haruna Iliyasu Shauaibu	Independent Democrats	79	0.01
Matthew Avre Ombugaku	Re-Build Nigeria	72	0.01
Mohammed Awwal Suleiman	KOWA Party	49	0.01
Nyam Mark Maida	People's Trust	46	0.01
Ismalia Taofiq	Democratic People's Congress	38	0.01
Peter Helen	Masses Movement of Nigeria	38	0.01
Bako Ahmed	Non-constituency Member of Parliament	33	0.00
Kreni Danju Mantani	Young Progressives Party	33	0.00
Aba Joseph R.	Alliance of Social Democrats	28	0.00
Theohius Gyado Madaki	Change Advocacy Party	16	0.00
Mohammed Nazir Adamu	Green Party of Nigeria	12	0.00
Cerrone Solo Waziri	Mass Action Joint Alliance Party	12	0.00
Sale Yahaya Alaji	People's Redemption Party	12	0.00
Khalid Shuaibu Mairiga	Democratic Alternative	7	0.00
Total		670,878	100.00
Valid votes		670,878	98.46
Invalid/blank votes		10,521	1.54
Total votes		681,399	100.00
Registered voters/turnout		1,617,786	42.12
Source: INEC

=== By local government area ===
Here are the results of the election by local government area for the two major parties. The total valid votes of 670,878 represents the 29 political parties that participated in the election. Blue represents LGAs won by Abdullahi Sule. Green represents LGAs won by David Ombugadu.

LGA	Abdullahi Sule APC		David Ombugadu PDP		Total votes
LGA	#	%	#	%	#
Wamba	15,706		9,332		
Awe	29,443		9,228		
Keana	11,759		6,579		
Toto	32,213		8,590		
Kokona	23,027		18,971		
Doma	10,029		10,318		
Keffi	25,589		12,419		
Obi	20,640		17,951		
Nasarawa	31,586		17,406		
Karu	23,207		21,967		
Akwanga	21,968		18,402		
Eggon	11,611		14,290		
Lafia	70,451		18,827		
Totals	327,229		184,281		670,878
