= Abdulmumin Muhammed Ari =

Nigerian politician

Member of the House of Representatives
- Constituency: Nasarawa/Toto Federal Constituency

Personal details
- Born: 27 November 1978 (age 47) Nasarawa State, Nigeria
- Occupation: Politician

Abdulmumin Muhammed Ari (born 27 November 1978) is a Nigerian politician representing the Nasarawa/Toto Federal Constituency in the National House of Representatives.

== Early life and education ==
Abdulmumin Muhammed Ari was born on 27 November 1978 in Nasarawa State, Nigeria.
