= Gaza Jonathan Gbefwi =

Nigerian politician

Member of the House of Representatives
- Constituency: Keffi/Karu/Kokona Federal Constituency

Personal details
- Born: 3 June 1975 (age 51) Nasarawa State, Nigeria
- Party: Social Democratic Party (SDP)
- Occupation: Politician

Gaza Jonathan Gbefwi (born 3 June 1975) is a Nigerian politician representing the Keffi/Karu/Kokona Federal Constituency in Nasarawa State. He is currently serving his third term in the House of Representatives under the Social Democratic Party (SDP).
