= Abubakar Nalaraba =

Nigerian politician

Member of the House of Representatives
- Incumbent
- Assumed office 2023
- Constituency: Awe/Doma/Keana Federal Constituency

Personal details
- Born: 17 July 1976 (age 49) Nasarawa State, Nigeria
- Party: All Progressives Congress
- Occupation: Politician

Abubakar Nalaraba is a Nigerian politician and lawmaker from Nasarawa State, Nigeria. He was born on 17 July 1976.

== Education and career ==
Hon. Abubakar Nalaraba holds a Master's degree (M.Sc) in Banking and Finance. He serves as a lawmaker in the Nasarawa 10th House of Representatives, National Assembly, representing the Awe/Doma/Keana Federal Constituency. He was elected in 2023 under the All Progressives Congress (APC) party.
