= 2015 Nigerian House of Representatives elections in Nasarawa State =

The 2015 Nigerian House of Representatives elections in Nasarawa State was held on March 28, 2015, to elect members of the House of Representatives to represent Nasarawa State, Nigeria.

== Overview ==
Affiliation	Party		Total
Affiliation	APC	PDP	Total
Before Election	-	1	5
After Election	2	3	5

== Summary ==
District	Incumbent	Party	Elected Reps Member	Party
Nasarawa/Toto	Musa Onwana Baba	CPC	Musa Onwana Baba	APC
Lafia/Obi	Kigbu Joseph Haruna	CPC	Abubakar Sarki Dahiru	APC
Keffi/Karu/Kokona	Ishaq Ahmed Kana	CPC	Gaza Jonathan Gbefwi	PDP
Awe/Doma/Keana	Mohammed Ogoshi Onawo	PDP	Mohammed Ogoshi Onawo	PDP
Akwanga/Nasarawa/Eggon/Wamba	David Ombugadu	CPC	David Ombugadu	PDP

== Results ==
=== Nasarawa/Toto ===
APC candidate Musa Onwana Baba won the election, defeating other party candidates.

2015 Nigerian House of Representatives election in Nasarawa State
Party	Candidate	Votes	%
APC	Musa Onwana Baba		
APC hold			

=== Lafia/Obi ===
APC candidate Abubakar Sarki Dahiru won the election, defeating other party candidates.

2015 Nigerian House of Representatives election in Nasarawa State
Party	Candidate	Votes	%
APC	Abubakar Sarki Dahiru		
APC hold			

=== Keffi/Karu/Kokona ===
PDP candidate Gaza Jonathan Gbefwi won the election, defeating other party candidates.

2015 Nigerian House of Representatives election in Nasarawa State
Party	Candidate	Votes	%
PDP	Gaza Jonathan Gbefwi		
PDP hold			

=== Awe/Doma/Keana ===
PDP candidate Mohammed Ogoshi Onawo won the election, defeating other party candidates.

2015 Nigerian House of Representatives election in Nasarawa State
Party	Candidate	Votes	%
PDP	Mohammed Ogoshi Onawo		
PDP hold			

=== Akwanga/Nasarawa/Eggon/Wamba ===
PDP candidate David Ombugadu won the election, defeating other party candidates.

2015 Nigerian House of Representatives election in Nasarawa State
Party	Candidate	Votes	%
PDP	David Ombugadu		
PDP hold			
