= College of Education, Akwanga =

The College of Education, Akwanga is a tertiary institution located in Akwanga town in Akwanga Local Government Area of Nasarawa State, in central Nigeria. The college is led by the following: Rev Jonathan Wakili Thani, Provost; Mr Yakubu Ojegba, Registrar; Mrs Lillian Okpede, Bursar and Dr Mohammed as Librarian.

== History ==
The institution was established as the Advanced Teachers College Akwanga in September 1976, by Plateau State edict No. 5 in 1978. The edict was then repealed in favour of Nasarawa State Edict No. 16 of 1996 which came into effect on 1 October 1996, after the state was created from Plateau State, by the Abacha government, which transferred the responsibilities of the institution to Nasarawa state government, as a result of the location of the institution in the new Nasarawa state.

The Advanced Teachers College began academic activities at a temporary site in Jos town with a campus in Akwanga. The Advanced Teachers College later moved from Jos to its permanent site in Akwanga, on 1 September 1985.

== Objectives of the institution ==
Objectives that the college was established to take care of as stated in the edict establishing the college are:

1. To offer courses leading to the Nigeria Certificate in Education through a three-year academic and professional course which, on successful completion, candidates qualify as teachers in primary schools and secondary and teachers training colleges.
2. To act as a centre for research into the various areas of educational theory and practice;
3. To mount from time to time in-service vacation courses for serving teachers.

The provost of the institution is Rev (Dr) Musa Bawa who took over responsibilities of the college in 1998. He handed over to Alh. Mukhtar Isa Waya in 2006. There was an E-revolution during his tenure, which saw the introduction of an e-library in the school in 2007–2009.

Courses

Agricultural science.

Arabic / Theatre.

Arabic/ Yoruba.

Arabic medium.

Biology/ Chemistry.
