= Muhammad Omadefu =

Nigerian politician

Muhammad Omadefu is a Nigerian politician. He currently serves as the State Representatives representing Karshi/Uke constituency at the Nasarawa State House of Assembly.
