= 2011 Nigerian House of Representatives elections in Nasarawa State =

The 2011 Nigerian House of Representatives elections in Nasarawa State was held on April 9, 2011, to elect members of the House of Representatives to represent Nasarawa State, Nigeria.

== Overview ==
Affiliation	Party		Total
Affiliation	CPC	PDP	Total
Before Election	-	5	5
After Election	4	1	5

== Summary ==
District	Incumbent	Party	Elected Reps Member	Party
Nasarawa/Toto	Samuel Egya	PDP	Musa Onwana Baba	CPC
Lafia/Obi	Mohammed Al-Makura	PDP	Kigbu Joseph Haruna	CPC
Keffi/Karu/Kokona	Ahmed D. Aliyu	PDP	Ishaq Ahmed Kana	CPC
Awe/Doma/Keana	Abdullahi S. Hashimu	PDP	Mohammed Ogoshi Onawo	PDP
Akwanga/Nasarawa/Eggon/Wamba	Idris Yahaya Yakubu	PDP	David Ombugadu	CPC

== Results ==
=== Nasarawa/Toto ===
CPC candidate Musa Onwana Baba won the election, defeating other party candidates.

2011 Nigerian House of Representatives election in Nasarawa State
Party	Candidate	Votes	%
CPC	Musa Onwana Baba		
CPC hold			

=== Lafia/Obi ===
CPC candidate Kigbu Joseph Haruna won the election, defeating other party candidates.

2011 Nigerian House of Representatives election in Nasarawa State
Party	Candidate	Votes	%
CPC	Kigbu Joseph Haruna		
CPC hold			

=== Keffi/Karu/Kokona ===
CPC candidate Ishaq Ahmed Kana won the election, defeating other party candidates.

2011 Nigerian House of Representatives election in Nasarawa State
Party	Candidate	Votes	%
CPC	Ishaq Ahmed Kana		
CPC hold			

=== Awe/Doma/Keana ===
PDP candidate Mohammed Ogoshi Onawo won the election, defeating other party candidates.

2011 Nigerian House of Representatives election in Nasarawa State
Party	Candidate	Votes	%
PDP	Mohammed Ogoshi Onawo		
PDP hold			

=== Akwanga/Nasarawa/Eggon/Wamba ===
CPC candidate David Ombugadu won the election, defeating other party candidates.

2011 Nigerian House of Representatives election in Nasarawa State
Party	Candidate	Votes	%
CPC	David Ombugadu		
CPC hold			
