= Ijem Onwuamaegbu =

Chief Judge of Anambra State, Nigeria

Justice Ijem Onwuamaegbu

Chief Judge of Anambra State
- In office March 2019 – September 2019

Personal details
- Born: 1954 (age 71–72)
- Education: University of Nigeria
- Occupation: Lawyer
- Known for: First female Chief Judge of Anambra State

Justice Ijem Onwuamaegbu (born 1954) was the first female Chief Judge of Anambra State. She was made the chairman of Anambra State Law Revision Committee on 13 December 2018. She graduated from University of Nigeria in 1977 and was called to the Nigerian Bar on 7 July 1978. She was sworn in as a Judge of the Anambra State High Court of Justice on 8 May 2001. She served in the National Assembly/Governorship/Legislative Houses Election Petition Tribunals in Nasarawa State and Ondo State in 2007 and 2008. Justice Onwuamaegbu was sworn in as the Acting Chief Judge of Anambra State on 1 March 2019 and was subsequently appointed and sworn in as the substantive Chief Judge of Anambra State in August 2019 becoming the first Female Chief Judge of Anambra State. She retired on 3 September 2019 on attainment of the mandatory constitutional retirement age of 65 years.
