= Loko, Nasarawa State =

Loko
- Town
- Location within Nigeria
- Coordinates: 7°59′N 7°49′E
- Country: Nigeria
- State: Nasarawa State
- LGA: Nasarawa
- Elevation: 97 m (318 ft)
- Time zone: UTC+1 (WAT)

Loko is a town in Nasarawa local government area of Nasarawa State in the middle belt region or North central zone of Nigeria.It is found along the River Benue bank. The town is a mini-port, along the river benue, for the conveyance of export materials, to the eastern and western parts of Nigeria.

== People ==
The main ethnic groups and the inhabitants of Loko town, are the Bassa, Agatu, Igbira, Afo. Others are Nupe, Hausa and Kanuri.

== Commercial Activities ==
The main activities engaged by the inhabitants of Loko town are farming and fishing.
