= Isah Indris Alhaji =

Nigerian politician

Member of the House of Representatives
- In office 2007–2011
- Constituency: Nassarawa Federal Constituency

Personal details
- Born: 2 October 1968 (age 57) Kano State, Nigeria
- Party: All Nigeria Peoples Party
- Occupation: Politician

Isah Indris Alhaji (born 2 October 1968) is a Nigerian politician from Kano State, Nigeria. He represented the Nassarawa Federal Constituency in the National Assembly as a member of the House of Representatives. He was elected under the banner of the All Nigeria Peoples Party (ANPP) and served from 2007 to 2011.
