= Nasarawa South senatorial district =

Nasarawa South senatorial district covers five local governments namely Awe, Doma, Keana, Lafia and Obi. Lafia is the headquarters (collation centre) of Nasarawa South senatorial district. Mohammed Onawo of the Peoples Democratic Party (PDP) is the current representative of Nasarawa South senatorial district.

== List of senators representing Nasarawa South ==
Senator	Party	Year	Assembly
Haruna Abubakar	PDP	1999–2003	4th
Emmanuel Okpede		2003–2007	5th
Suleiman Adokwe	PDP	2007–2019	6th, 7th, 8th
Tanko Al-Makura	APC	2019–2023	9th
Mohammed Onawo	PDP	2023–present	10th
