= Opanda Kingdom =

Ancient African kingdom

Opanda Kingdom was an ancient African kingdom located in what is now Nigeria.

== Ancient history ==
The ancient Opanda Kingdom was founded by the Egbura ethnic group. Its growth culminated in the Umaisha (Oherehu) which is now the alternative seat of Opanda.

Opanda (also called Panda) was first established in the 11th century, abandoned in the middle of the 16th century, and reoccupied around 1750. Opanda was ruled by the Egbura between 1349 and 1385. In the middle of the 16th century, some of the inhabitants emigrated to Apa II, north of Idah, where the Egbura, had already settled. Ebele, the daughter and successor of Abutu Eje who was the founder of Igala Kingdom. A dispute over Idah's kingship which led to the migration of several groups. The group led by Ohemi Ozi Egye left Idah with his family members/followers he took the Omu which means Horse tale in Egbura dialect cause he lost to a junior first settled at Onyokan, the present-day Kogi State; later they moved to Okangbo in the present-day Nasarawa State and then moved to Igugbaka in the present-day Kogi state which is the polity of all Egbura speaking people.

Amid a succession dispute following the death of Ohemi Ozi Egye, Ohime and Ohetenye took their followers west and settled at Girinya in the present-day Kogi state. Some years later Ohime's brother Owutu founded the present-day Kotonkarfe (Igu). A third group, led by Ohime negedu, the grandson of Oheme, moved east in 1750 and reoccupied the city of Opanda in the present-day Nasarawa state. The sister kingdoms of Opanda and Igu/koto karfe flourished side by side maintaining bilateral cooperation in a manner that ensured their mutual protection against external aggression. the kingdom dates way back in time. According to the accounts of a British explorer, McGregor Laird, in the diary of his trip up the Benue River, “the Egbura (ethnic group) founded the Kingdom of Opanda in 1750.” The kingdom was equally blessed with visionary leaders who ensured its survival through the rough socio-political climate of the pre-colonial time when might was the determinant of political and economic power. The Ohimegye dynasty is said to be as far back as the 11th century. Some historians noted that an account by Dr. Baikie, another British explorer, who visited Umaisha in 1854 during the reign of Ohimegye Ogara, gave the suggested year of the establishment of the kingdom to be 1750 without taking note of its existence prior to the movement to Idah and back to Opanda before the commencement of the line of kings whose list he met. Similarly, a book titled Notes on Nassarawa Province, Nigeria, written by Sciortino, J. C and printed by Waterlow & Sons Limited, London, 1920, gives insightful perspectives on the ancient kingdom in this regard. In the case of the Egbura ethnic group, even before Kwararafa assumed its status as one of the most powerful empires in West Africa before the 16th century, Opanda was a well defined political entity back in the 11th century. Egbura are mainly farmers. The primary crops grown for export are yam and cassava. Guinea corn is an important local commodity as the staple of most meals and is used in the brewing of beer. Other crops include rice, millet, cow peas, and groundnuts. Goats, sheep, cows, and chicken are also raised for local consumption. Rivers and streams abound on the Niger-Benue plateau. Fishing is conducted by individual households, and in recent years larger fish farms have been developed by private and public firms, the Egbura people are hardworking naturally and very intelligent and outspoken. The northern Egbura traditionally had a highly centralized government that recognized a chief who inherited his power in a patrilineal fashion. The supreme Egbura chief was divine and resided at Opanda (Umaisha) and Igu (Koto karfe) respectively. Numerous local chiefs who were the heads of royal families reported to him, producing what was in effect a miniature confederacy. The head chief received tributes from local chiefs, and in return he sent gifts. The Egbura state system was similar to that of the Jukun Kingdom. The southern Ebira group was somewhat less centralized than their northern cousins. Their governing system acknowledges local leaders for each of the five founding families, but does not recognize a supreme chief before the coming of the British/Colonial government/master who centralized the southern Ebira for easy governing and operation. The traditional beliefs of the Egbura centre on Ihinegba, the supreme god, who is benevolent, resides in the sky, and controls the universe. Ihinegba is approached through intermediary spirits, who are connected with such natural objects as trees. Egbura ancestors are also viewed as agents of Ihinegba. Since the early 20th century many Egbura have been converted to Islam and Christianity.Ohimegye is derived from the word OHIME-OZI-EGYE meaning OHIME-SON OF EGYE. Thus Ohimegye is an Egbura word and is the title or the paramount Ruler of Opanda and Igu respectively.
