= Ohizi Ogabo =

Ohizi Ogabo is a settlement in the Local Government Area of Toto in Nasarawa State, Nigeria.
