= Mohammed Onawo =

Senator from Nasarawa South Senatorial District in the 10th Senate

Hon. Mohammed Onawo

Member of the House of Representatives
- In office 2011–2023
- Preceded by: David Ombugadu
- Succeeded by: Gaza Jonathan Gbefwi
- Constituency: Keffi/Kokona/Karu Federal Constituency

Personal details
- Party: Peoples Democratic Party (PDP)
- Occupation: Politician

Mohammed Ogoshi Onawo is a Nigerian politician, a businessman, a philanthropist and a member of the 10th Senate from Nasarawa South Senatorial District on the ticket of the People's Democratic Party (PDP). He was a member of the Nasarawa State House of Assembly from 2003 to 2011 and the Speaker Nasarawa State House Of Assembly from 2003 to 2007. He was also a member of the 7th and 8th National Assembly - House of Representatives.

== Early life and education ==
Onawo is a Nigerian politician and businessman from Nasarawa State. He completed his secondary education at A.T.C. Akwanga before attending Ramat Polytechnic, Maiduguri. He later earned a degree from Nasarawa State University.

== Political career ==
Onawo was a Speaker and a member of the 2nd and 3rd Nasarawa State House of Assembly between 2003 and 2011, respectively, before being elected to the 7th and 8th National Assembly - House of Representatives - between 2011 and 2019 representing Awe/Doma/Keana Federal Constituency. Onawo served as House of Representatives Committee Chairman on Industries between 2011 and 2015; as well as Chairman, House of Representatives Committee on ICT between 2015 and 2019. In 2019, he ran in the primary elections for Nasarawa South Senatorial District on the ticket of the PDP but lost and was subsequently nominated as the Deputy Gubernatorial candidate for the PDP at the 2019 general elections. He won the PDP ticket again in the 2022 primary elections, scoring 88 delegates votes to defeat his closest rival, Mike Omeri, who polled 76 votes. In the February 25, 2023 Senate election, he ran against a former governor of Nasarawa State and incumbent Senator Tanko Al-Makura of the APC. Running against the former two term governor and incumbent senator, Onawo was underrated and his chances of winning the election was rated very low by political pundits. In the election, Onawo sprung a surprise after polling a majority of 93,064 votes to defeat his highly rated opponent Tanko Al-Makura of the APC who scored 76,813, winning all the five (5) Local Government Areas in the Senatorial District. Onawo's victory was a major political upset in the 2023 general elections in Nasarawa State.
