= Solomon Yakubu Akwashiki =

Nigerian politician

Solomon Yakubu Akwashiki is a Nigerian politician. He currently serves as the State Representatives representing Lafia Central constituency at the Nasarawa State House of Assembly.
