= 2019 Nigerian House of Representatives elections in Nasarawa State =

The 2019 Nigerian House of Representatives elections in Nasarawa State was held on February 23, 2019, to elect members of the House of Representatives to represent Nasarawa State, Nigeria.

== Overview ==
Affiliation	Party		Total
Affiliation	APC	PDP	Total
Before Election	2	3	5
After Election	3	2	5

== Summary ==
District	Incumbent	Party	Elected Senator	Party
Nasarawa/Toto	Musa Baba Onwana	APC	Ari Muhammed Abdulmumin	APC
Lafia/Obi	Abubakar Sarki Dahiru	APC	Shehu Saleh	APC
Keffi/Karu/Kokona	Gaza Jonathan Gbefwi	PDP	Gaza Jonathan Gbefwi	PDP
Awe/Doma/Keana	Mohammed Onawo	PDP	Abubakar Hassan Nalaraba	APC
Akwanga/Nasarawa/Eggon/Wamba	David Ombugadu	PDP	Abdulkarim Usman	PDP

== Results ==
=== Nasarawa/Toto ===
A total of 11 candidates registered with the Independent National Electoral Commission to contest in the election. APC candidate Ari Muhammed Abdulmumin won the election, defeating PDP Musa Ahmed Mohammed and 9 other party candidates.

2019 Nigerian House of Representatives election in Niger State
Party	Candidate	Votes	%
APC	Ari Muhammed Abdulmumin	33,197	
PDP	Musa Ahmed Mohammed	17,695	
Total votes			
APC hold			

=== Lafia/Obi ===
A total of 13 candidates registered with the Independent National Electoral Commission to contest in the election. APC candidate Abubakar Sarki Dahiru won the election, defeating PDP Joseph Haruna Kigbu and 11 other party candidates.

2019 Nigerian House of Representatives election in Nasarawa State
Party	Candidate	Votes	%
APC	Abubakar Sarki Dahiru	61,992	
PDP	Joseph Haruna Kigbu	52,392	
Total votes			
APC hold			

=== Keffi/Karu/Kokona ===
A total of 12 candidates registered with the Independent National Electoral Commission to contest in the election. PDP candidate Gaza Jonathan Gbefwi won the election, defeating APC Jacob Okari Owa and 10 other party candidates.

2019 Nigerian House of Representatives election in Nasarawa State
Party	Candidate	Votes	%
PDP	Gaza Jonathan Gbefwi	92,282	
APC	Jacob Okari Owa	59,661	
Total votes			
APC hold			

=== Awe/Doma/Keana ===
A total of 8 candidates registered with the Independent National Electoral Commission to contest in the election. APC candidate Hassan Abubakar Nalaraba won the election, defeating PDP Abubakar Idris Gani and 6 other party candidates.

2019 Nigerian House of Representatives election in Nasarawa State
Party	Candidate	Votes	%
APC	Hassan Abubakar Nalaraba	41,535	
PDP	Abubakar Idris Gani	30,410	
Total votes			
APC hold			

=== Akwanga/Nasarawa/Eggon/Wamba ===
A total of 16 candidates registered with the Independent National Electoral Commission to contest in the election. PDP candidate Abdulkarim Usman won the election, defeating APC Muhammed Abdullahi Yau and 14 other party candidates.

2019 Nigerian House of Representatives election in Nasarawa State
Party	Candidate	Votes	%
PDP	Abdulkarim Usman	57,322	
APC	Muhammed Abdullahi Yau	40,848	
Total votes			
PDP hold			
