= Emmanuel Akabe =

Nigerian politician

His Excellency Emmanuel Agbadu Akabe

Deputy Governor of Nasarawa State
- Incumbent
- Assumed office 29 May 2019
- Governor: Abdullahi Sule
- Preceded by: Silas Ali Agara

Personal details
- Party: All Progressives Congress
- Profession: Medical doctor, Politician

Emmanuel Agbadu Akabe is a Nigerian politician and medical doctor who is serving as the Deputy Governor of Nasarawa State, Nigeria. He serves alongside Governor Abdullahi Sule and is a member of the All Progressives Congress (APC).

== Early life and education ==
He is a medical doctor by profession.

== Political career ==
Akabe was elected Deputy Governor of Nasarawa State in 2019 on the APC ticket and was sworn in on 29 May 2019. He was re-elected for a second term in 2023.

=== Public engagements ===
In 2023, Akabe called on political leaders in Nasarawa State to assist less-privileged residents in their communities. He spoke during an empowerment programme for 200 individuals in Lafia, where he was represented by the Commissioner for Trade, Industry and Investment.

Akabe has also been involved in inspecting state infrastructure projects. In August 2026, he inspected ongoing renovation works at the Lafia City Stadium, where the playing turf was being replaced ahead of the 2026/27 NPFL season. He stated that the facility would meet league standards and be ready for the new football season.

In 2023, while speaking to journalists at the APC National Secretariat in Abuja, Akabe commented on the election of leadership for the 10th National Assembly. He stated that the selection of Speaker of the House of Representatives should be left to lawmakers to decide.

=== Security incident ===
In November 2019, Akabe's convoy was attacked by suspected armed robbers along the Akwanga-Abuja road. According to police reports, three police officers and one civilian were killed in the attack. The Deputy Governor was reported to have escaped unhurt.
