= Ahmed Wadada =

Nigerian politician

- Ahmed Aliyu Wadada

Senator of the Federal Republic of Nigeria
- Incumbent
- Assumed office 13 June 2023
- Preceded by: Abdullahi Adamu
- Constituency: Nasarawa West Senatorial District

Member of the House of Representatives of Nigeria
- In office 2003–2011
- Constituency: Keffi/Karu/Kokona Federal Constituency

Personal details
- Born: Keffi, Nasarawa State, Nigeria
- Party: Social Democratic Party (2022–present)
- Occupation: Politician

Ahmed Aliyu Wadada is a Nigerian politician representing Nasarawa West district in the 10th National assembly.

== Political career ==
Wadada was a member of the House of Representatives. He was a member of the All Progressives Congress, APC before resigning from the party in 2022 following a disputed primary election. Wadada had prior to APC primary election for Nasarawa West Senatorial District complained of irregularity in the delegates list from Keffi and Nasarawa Local Government Areas. This made him to withdraw from the contest and subsequently resigned from APC to join Social Democratic Party, SDP. In the SDP, he won the nomination to contest the senatorial election. During the campaign, some of his campaign activities were restricted to certain areas on the alleged clandestine instructions from the ruling party in the state, APC. Wadada then boasted of his popularity and said no amount of intimidation would diminish his popularity.

In the February 25, 2023 Senate election, Wadada polled 96,488 votes to defeat the candidates of the APC Shehu Tukur who scored 47,717 and the PDP's Musa Galadima who got 46,820 votes. The electoral victory of Wadada is recorded as one of the major political upsets in the 2023 general elections because Nasarawa West Senatorial District is the zone of the National Chairman of the Nigeria's ruling party, APC, Abdullahi Adamu.
