= Umaisha =

Umaisha Yimaha
- Town
- Location within Nigeria
- Coordinates: 08°01′N 07°12′E
- Country: Nigeria
- State: Nasarawa State
- LGA: Toto
- Kingdom: Opanda
- Time zone: UTC+01:00 (WAT)
- Postal code: 962
- Climate: Aw

Umaisha (Yimaha) is a town in Toto Local Government Area as well as an Opanda Kingdom headquarters, in Nasarawa State in the Middle Belt region of Nigeria. The postal code of the area is 962.
