= Abdullahi Sule =

Nigerian politician (born 1959)

His Excellency Abdullahi Sule

Governor of Nasarawa State
- Incumbent
- Assumed office 29 May 2019
- Deputy: Emmanuel Akabe
- Preceded by: Umaru Tanko Al-Makura

Personal details
- Born: 26 December 1959 (age 66) Akwanga, Northern Region, British Nigeria (now in Nasarawa State, Nigeria)
- Party: All Progressives Congress (APC)
- Spouses: Silifa Sule; Farida Sule
- Education: Government Technical College, Bukuru; Plateau State Polytechnic; Indiana State University
- Occupation: Politician; engineer; businessman

Abdullahi Audu Sule (born 26 December 1959) is a Nigerian engineer, businessman, and politician who has served as the Governor of Nasarawa State since 2019. He was elected on the platform of the All Progressives Congress (APC).

== Early life and education ==
Abdullahi Sule was born on 26 December 1959 in the Akwanga-West Development Area of present-day Nasarawa State. He received his primary education at the Roman Catholic Mission Primary School in Gudi Station in 1968, attended Zang Secondary School in 1974, and later enrolled at the Government Technical College, Bukuru in 1977.

In 1980, he attended the Plateau State Polytechnic in Barkin Ladi before proceeding on a scholarship to Indiana State University in Terre Haute, Indiana, United States, where he earned a Bachelor of Science in Mechanical Technology and a master's degree in Industrial Technology.

== Business career ==
Following his return to Nigeria in 1985, Sule completed his National Youth Service Corps (NYSC) primary assignment with the Plateau Utilities Board and subsequently joined the Jos Steel Rolling Mill as a production engineer. In 1989, he returned to the United States, working with multiple engineering and manufacturing firms including Lancer Corporation and Osyka Corporation.

In 2000, he co-founded Sadiq Petroleum Nigeria Limited in Lagos, serving as its managing director and chief executive officer. Under his leadership, the firm acquired a core stake in African Petroleum (AP) Plc, where he became CEO in 2001. In June 2018, prior to running for public office, Dangote Sugar Refinery Plc appointed Sule as its Group Managing Director.

== Controversy ==
On 11th March 2026 Abdullahi Sule held secret meeting with former vice president Atiku Abubakar at Conrad Jabal Omar Hotel in Mecca, Saudi Arabia. According to source the agenda of the meeting was Atiku Abubakar 2027 presidential election campaign funding. That governor Abdullahi Sule promised to make funds secretly give financial support to Atiku Abubakar in 2027 general elections.

== Political career ==
On 1 October 2018, Sule won the gubernatorial primary election of the All Progressives Congress (APC) for Nasarawa State.

He was declared the winner of the 2019 Nasarawa State gubernatorial election on 10 March 2019 and was sworn into office on 29 May 2019. In the March 2023 governorship election, Sule was re-elected for a second term in office.

== See also ==
- List of governors of Nasarawa State
