= Solomon Ewuga =

Nigerian politician (1955–2025)

Solomon Ewuga (19 June 1955 – 23 September 2025) was a Nigerian politician who served as a senator representing Nasarawa North senatorial district in the 7th Nigerian Senate. Prior to his tenure in the Senate, he held the position of Deputy Governor of Nasarawa State. He also served as the Minister of State for the Federal Capital Territory (FCT). Ewuga died on 23 September 2025, at the age of 70.
