= Nasarawa State House of Assembly =

Unicameral legislature in Nigeria

The Nasarawa State House of Assembly is the unicameral legislature of Nasarawa State in Nigeria. The House of Assembly consists of 24 members, including a Speaker and Deputy Speaker. The legislature is seated in Lafia, along shendam Road Lafia the capital city of Nasarawa State.
