= Toto, Nigeria =

Toto
- LGA and town
- Interactive map of Toto
- Location within Nigeria
- Country: Nigeria
- State: Nasarawa State

Government
  - LGA Chairman: Hon. Abdullahi Tashas Aquatic

Area
  - Total: 2,903 km^{2} (1,121 sq mi)

Population (2006)
  - Total: 119,077
  - Density: 41.02/km^{2} (106.2/sq mi)
- Time zone: UTC+1 (WAT)
- Postal code: 962

Toto is a town and Local Government Area in Nasarawa State, Nigeria.

Toto falls within the western senatorial district of Nasarawa State otherwise known as Nasarawa West Senatorial District alongside Nasarawa, Keffi, Karu and Kokona Local Government Areas. Toto local government area also forms a federal constituency alongside Nasarawa local government area, and Toto covers an area of 2,903 km^{2}. The local government area is bounded to the north by the Federal Capital Territory, to the east by Nasarawa local government area, and to the south and west by Kogi State, and a population of 119,077 at the 2006 census. Toto Local Government has three districts namely Gadabuke, Toto and Umaisha. Settlements within the area include Shafan kwatto, Shafan Abakpa, Ogatte Osinabu and Ohizi Ogabo.

The postal code of the area is 962.

The local government area is primarily inhabited by the Bassa people and the Egbura people, with smaller populations of Gade, Gbagyi, and Fulani communities also residing there.

== Climate ==
A tropical wet and dry climate characterises Toto, Nigeria, with an annual temperature of 30.56 °C (87.01 °F), 1.1% higher than the national average, and 161.54 days with precipitation.

=== Temperature ===
Toto's temperature trend shows a warming trend, with warmer years producing a colder climate and colder years having warming stripes.
