= Eggon, Nigeria =

Nassarawa Eggon
- LGA and Town
- Interactive map of Nassarawa Eggon
- Coordinates: 8°42′34″N 8°32′10″E
- Country: Nigeria
- State: Nasarawa State

Government
  - Aren Eggon: Dr. Bala Angbazo JP MFR

Area
  - Total: 1,208 km^{2} (466 sq mi)

Population (2006)
  - Total: 149,129
  - Density: 123.5/km^{2} (319.7/sq mi)
- Time zone: UTC+1 (WAT)
- Postal code: 960

Nassarawa-Eggon is a town and Local Government Area in Nasarawa State, Nigeria.

It has an area of 1,208 km^{2} and a population of 149,129 at the 2006 census.

The postal code of the area is 960.

Eggon LGA is headquartered in the town of Eggon and its consists of towns and districts of Ende, Ginda, Alizaga, Arugbadu, Bakyano, Eggon, Sako, Umme, Agunji, Alogani, Arikpa, Ezzen, Wakama, Angbaku, Buba, Galle, Gbamze, Ogbagi, Wogan and Ubbe.
