= David Ombugadu =

Nigerian politician

David Emmanuel Ombugadu is a Nigerian politician who was a Member of House of Representatives Nigeria representing Akwanga, Wamba and Nassarawa Eggon federal constituency from 2011 to 2019. He contested as the governorship candidate of the Peoples Democratic Party (Nigeria)(PDP) for Nasarawa state in the 2019 and 2023 general elections.

== Early life and education ==
Emmanuel Ombugadu was born January 10, 1978. He attended LEA Primary School Kakuri in Kaduna State. In 1995, he attend Government College Keffi where he obtained his SSCE certificate. He then proceeded to the University of Jos to get a bachelor's degree (Bsc.) in Economics in 2001.

He later proceeded to do his NYSC in 2003. He proceeded to doing his masters (Msc.) at Rivers State University of Science and Technology.

== Political career ==
Emmanuel Ombugadu was a committee member in the privatization and commercialization committee, rules and business committee and public accounts committee until May 2015.

He then proceeded to take his political career further by running for Nasarrawa House of Representatives from 2011 – 2015 and again from 2015 – 2019.

In 2019 and 2023 Ombugadu contested for the office of Nasarawa State Governor under the Peoples Democratic Party (Nigeria).

== See also ==
- List of members of the House of Representatives of Nigeria, 2015–2019
