= Wamba, Nigeria =

Wamba
- LGA and town
- Nickname: Wanna
- Motto: The Heartland of Cassava
- Interactive map of Wamba
- Location in Nigeria
- Coordinates: 8°56′0″N 8°36′0″E
- Country: Nigeria
- State: Nasarawa State

Government
  - Type: Democratic
  - Executive Chairman: Hon. Bala Asiru

Area
  - Total: 1,156 km^{2} (446 sq mi)

Population (2006)
  - Total: 72,894
  - Density: 63.06/km^{2} (163.3/sq mi)
- Time zone: UTC+1 (WAT)
- Postal code: 960

Wamba is a town and one of the 13 local government areas in Nasarawa State, North-central Nigeria.

It has an estimated land area of 1,156 km^{2} (446 sq mi) and a population of about 72,894 based on the 2006 census estimates.

Wamba local government is an agrarian sub-state, it is known for casava, pidgeon pea, palm carnel and oil, productions respectively.

Wamba also has minerals deposit like lead, barite, tantalite, columbite, and gems such as Aquamarine and gold. Yet to be exploited officially.

Wamba is both heteroethnic heteroreligious, Among the nation's that make up the area are:

Arum, Atoro, Buh, Kantana, Kulere, Ninzom, Ninkada, Reindeer, and Yashi.

== Attractions ==
Wamba Local government is renowned for the spectacular and beautiful Farin Ruwa Falls. One of the longest Cascades in Africa. It presents a long Cascade of white rapids from the Highlands of Plateau states down to the foothills, ending with the main attraction Farin Ruwa Falls, in Wamba Local government.

== Postal Code ==
The postal code of the area is 960.

== Climate ==
The summer months in Wamba are January through April, with March being the hottest month. From June to October is considered the cool season, with August being the coolest month.
