= Doma, Nigeria =

Doma
- LGA and Town
- Interactive map of Doma
- Location within Nigeria
- Coordinates: 8°23′42″N 8°21′38″E
- Country: Nigeria
- State: Nasarawa State

Government
  - Andoma: Ahmadu Aliyu Ogah Onawo

Area
  - Total: 2,714 km^{2} (1,048 sq mi)

Population (2022)
  - Total: 214,600
  - Density: 79.07/km^{2} (204.8/sq mi)
- Time zone: UTC+01:00 (WAT)

Doma is a town and Local Government Area in Nasarawa State, Nigeria. Doma LGA houses Special Forces Command, Federal Science and Technical College, Olam Rice Farm and Doma Dam.

It has an area of 2,714 km^{2} and had a population of 139,607 in the 2006 census.

The postal code of the area is 950. Odu is the annual festival in Doma local government. Farming is the occupation of most of the Alago people who are the predominant tribe in Doma. While the Alago people are predominant in the Northern part of the Local Government Council, the Bassa people are found in great number in the Southern part of Doma.

The average temperature of Doma is 30 °C with a wind speed of an average of 12 km/h and a total rain precipitation of 1750 mm per annum.

== History ==
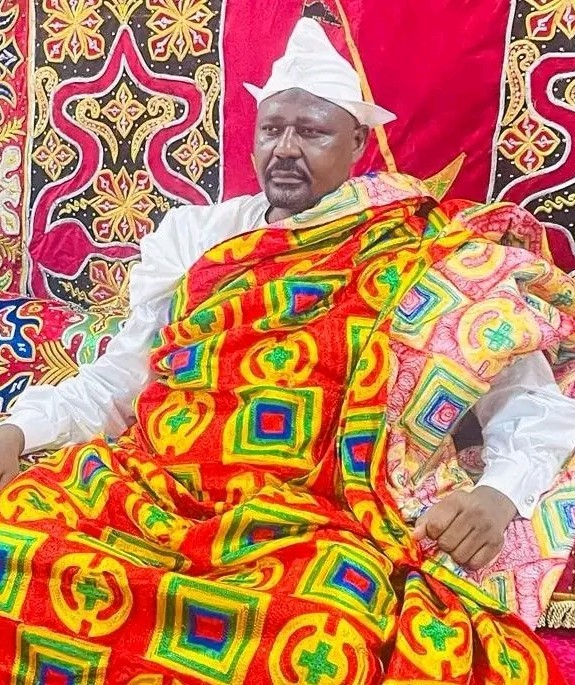
The 43rd Andoma of Doma Alhaji (Dr) Ahmadu Aliyu Oga Onawo (OON) (2004- date), seated in his palace in Doma.

The Kingdom of Doma was founded in 1232 by Andoma and lasted until 1901 when it became part of the British Protectorate of northern Nigeria.

Doma/Alago people led by Osabonya Ogoshi Andoma were believed to have moved and settled in other places including Idah in the present-day Kogi State, Apa, Otupka, and Ogyogo at the bank of river Benue in the present-day Benue State, and then in Oba’sidoma in the present-day Keana LGA of Nasarawa State before they finally settled at their present location. The Alago-speaking people of Doma were originally known and referred to as Idoma and migrated from Apa the seat of the ancient Kwararafa Empire. Their popular tale indicated that Doma was founded in the 13th century- around 1232 AD. The general theories and history of Alago migration and settlement are by extension the theories and history of the Jukun/Kwararafa Empire which was the theory and history of constant movement from one settlement to another within the territorial boundary of the defunct Kwararafa Empire and indeed outside the area. This includes the theory of Eastern Migration, early settlement, language classification, and ethnology, the theory of constant warfare, and the theory of the confederacy of the Kwararafa Empire. This explains the relationship that existed between the Jukuns and the Alagos and by extension all the Kwararafa family members.

The Alago people of Doma and their brethren from Keana, Aloshi, Ibi, Obi, Agaza, Alagye, Agbashi, Agwatashi, and Assakio among others were believed to have come from the ancient Kwararafa empire. The migration was said to have taken them to places such as Idah in Kogi State, Ogyogo in Benue State, Obasidoma in Keana LGA, and finally to Doma. Although the movement was in two phases, the first phase was led by the founder of Doma Osabonnya Ogoshi Andoma.

== Climatic Condition ==
Throughout the year, the weather in Doma varies, with March being the hottest month and December the coldest.

The climate in Doma is experiencing a shift in temperature, with warmer years and colder ones, as indicated by the positive trend in the temperature.

== Notable people ==
- Alhaji (Dr) Ahmadu Aliyu Oga Onawo (OON) Current Emir of Doma, The 43rd Andoma of Doma.
- Aliyu Akwe Doma former Governor of Nasarawa State.
- Dr. Emmanuel Agbadu Akabe (Jagaban Doma), Nasarawa state Deputy Governor.
- Muhammed Ogoshi Onawo (Ciroman Doma). Senator, Nasarawa South Senatorial District Senator.
- Amb. Usman Ari Ogah, Nigeria Ambassadors to Indonesia.
- Amb. Henry John Omaku, (Giwan-Doma)Nigeria Ambassadors to Republic of Sierra-Leone
- HRH Engr. Muhammad Addra, managing director, Lower Benue River Basin Development Authority, Makurdi.
- Arc. Ahmed Sarki Usman (Turaki-Kenge) is the incumbent Executive Chairman, of Doma LGA
- Hon. Muhammed Adamu Oyanki (Sadauki-Kenge) Member representing Doma North State Assembly
- Hon Musa Ibrahim Muhammed (Dan-Kaden Doma) Member representing Doma South State Assembly.

List of Rulers of Doma

Names and Dates taken from John Stewart's African States and Rulers (2005).

- Andoma (1232 - ?)
- Aseil
- Akau (? - c. 1300)
- Akwei (c. 1300 - ?)
- Adago
- Oka (? - c. 1390)
- Okabu (c. 1390 - ?)
- Okaku (? - c. 1480)
- Aboshe (c. 1480 - c. 1500)
- Oga I (c. 1500 - ?)
- Atta I
- Anao (? - c. 1600)
- Akwe I (c. 1600 - ?)
- Aboshi
- Adra (? - c. 1700)
- Asabo (c. 1700 - ?)
- Anawo (? - c. 1800)
- Oga II (c. 1800 - ?)
- Ogu
- Atta II
- Ari (? - c. 1855)
- Akwe II (c. 1855 - ?)
- Amaku
- Atta III
- Ausu
- Agabi
- Agulu
- Agabdo (? - 1901)
- Atta IV (1901 - 1930)
