= Keana =

Keana Akyana
- LGA and town
- Nickname: Salt city
- Interactive map of Keana
- Country: Nigeria
- State: Nasarawa State

Government
  - Osana of Keana: Abdullahi Amegwa Agbo III
  - Member House of Representatives: Abubakar Hassan Nalaraba

Area
  - Total: 1,048.1 km^{2} (404.7 sq mi)

Population (2006)
  - Total: 80,000
  - Density: 76/km^{2} (200/sq mi)
- Time zone: UTC+1 (WAT)
- Postal code: 951

Keana is a town and Local Government Area in Nasarawa State, North Central, Nigeria. It has an area of 1,048.1 km^{2} and a population of about 80,000 (according to the 2006 census). It is home to Federal Government Girls College, Keana.

Keana city is one of the 13 local government of Nasarawa state in Northern Nigeria founded by Akyana Adi in 12th century, Keana is home to the Federal Government Girls College, Keana and home of salt. Keana together with Doma, Obi, Agwatashi and, Assakio are the major town/city centres of the Alago nation. The Alago ethnic extraction have enjoyed cordial relationships with other tribes along the bank of the Benue Valley. The town now have 34th Osana - the person of Alh. Abdullahi Amegwa lll, he, together with the Andoma of Doma and the Osuko of Obi, are considered as one of the most powerful traditional rulers of Alago nation and the entire nasarawa state at large.

The postal code of the area is 951.

== Climatic Condition ==
Between the wet and dry seasons, the temperature hardly ever changes, with the rainy season being oppressive and overcast and the dry season being humid and partially cloudy.
