= Nasarawa, Nasarawa State =

Town in Nasarawa State

Nasarawa Nasara Nasarawan Makama Dogo
- LGA and Town
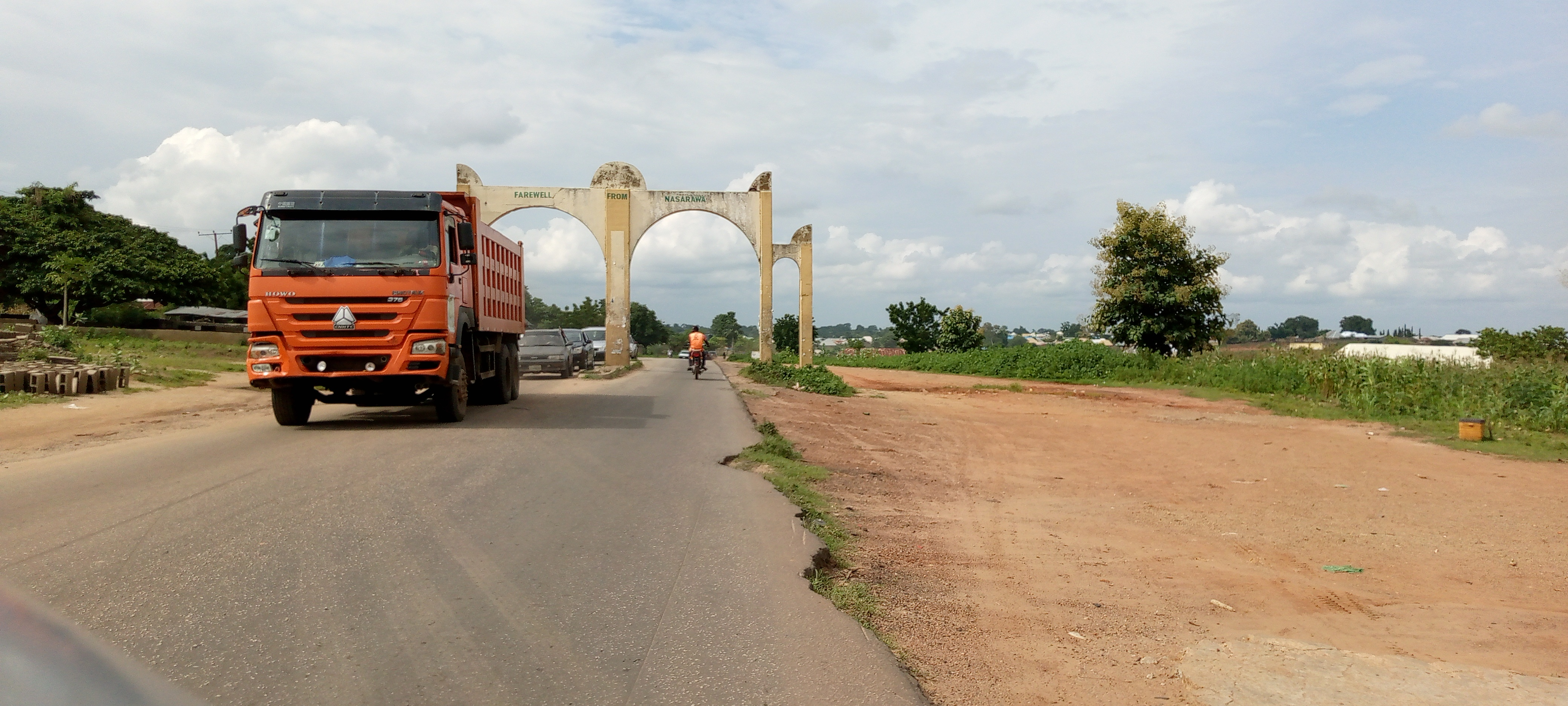
- "Farewell from Nasarawa"
- Nickname: The Victorious
- Motto: Masu Nasara
- Interactive map of Nasarawa
- Location within Nigeria
- Coordinates: 08°32′N 07°42′E
- Country: Nigeria
- State: Nasarawa State

Government
  - Emir: Mallam Ibrahim Usman Jibril CON

Area
  - Total: 5,704 km^{2} (2,202 sq mi)

Population (2006)
  - Total: 189,835
  - Density: 33.28/km^{2} (86.20/sq mi)
- Time zone: UTC+1 (WAT)
- Postal code: 962

Nasarawa is a town and Local Government Area in Nasarawa State, Nigeria. It is located at 8°32'N 7°42'E, with a population of 30,949 (as of 2016). The local government area has an area of 5,704 km^{2} and a population of 189,835 at the 2006 census. The postal code of the area is 962.

== Education ==
Nasarawa town is home to tertiary institutions such as:

- Federal Polytechnic Nasarawa

== Resources ==
The area's economic activity centers on the tin and columbite mining industry and farming.

== Agriculture ==
Nasarawa is a market center for the melon, yams, sorghum, millet, soybeans, shea nuts, and cotton grown in the surrounding area. The town is served by many secondary schools such as the Federal Polytechnic Nasarawa Academy, Government College, and Nasarawa Community Secondary School. It has both public and private hospitals together with patent medicine shops. It is located at the intersection of local roads that lead to Keffi and the Benue River ports of Loko. it is also an intersection that leads to Toto and Umaisha. Pop. (2006) Local government area, 189,835

== Kingdom ==
Nasarawa is a town in Nasarawa State, North central Nigeria. The town lies just north of a fork in the Okwa River, which is a tributary of the Benue River. Nasarawa was founded in 1835 following the conquest of Umaru (Makama Dogo) and his armies on Ikereku Kingdom of the Bassa people. He is a dissident official from the nearby town of Keffi, who hailed from Ruma in Katsina State, as the seat of the new emirate of Nassarawa. Umaru expanded his domain by conquering neighboring territory and made Nassarawa a vassal state to Zazzau (175 miles [282 km] north). One of his successors, Muhammadu Dan Waji (reigned 1878–1923), enlarged the emirate by various conquests and, in 1900, was one of the first emirs to pledge allegiance to Great Britain. In 1976 Nasarawa became part of Plateau State; in 1996, it became part of Nasarawa state.

== Fulani Rulers ==
Chronology of Fulani Rulers of Nasarawa Since 1835 - Date

S/N	RULER	PERIOD	DURATION
1	Umaru Usman (Makama Dogo - Founder)	1835 - 1858	23 Years
2	Ahmadu Umaru	1858 - 1878	20 Years
3	Muhammadu Sani (Mamman Sani)	1878	40 Days
4	Muhammadu Umaru Dan Waji (Maje-Lokoja)	1878 - 1923	45 Years
5	Ahmadu Dan Ahoda	1923 - 1924	1 year
6	Muhammadu Dan Ashaba	1924 - 1926	2 Years
7	Usman Ahmadu	1926 - 1942	16 Years
8	Alh. Umaru Muhammadu (Maje-Haji)	1942 - 1960	18 Years
9	Alh. Jibrin Idrisu Mairiga MFR	1960 - 1992	32 years
10	Alh. Ibrahim Ramalan Abubakar CON, FFPN	1992 - 2004	12 Years
11	Alh. Dr. Hassan Ahmed II MFR, mni	2004 - 2018	14 Years
12	Mallam Ibrahim Usman Jibril CON	2018 -	
