= Umaru Tanko Al-Makura =

Nigerian politician and businessman

Fmr Senator for Nasarawa State South district
- Incumbent
- Assumed office June 11, 2019
- Preceded by: Suleiman Adokwe

Governor of Nasarawa State
- In office 29 May 2011 – 29 May 2019
- Preceded by: Aliyu Doma
- Succeeded by: Abdullahi Sule

Personal details
- Born: November 1952 (age 73) Lafia, Nasarawa State, Nigeria
- Party: All Progressives Congress (APC)
- Education: Dunama Primary School
- Alma mater: Ahmadu Bello University
- Occupation: Businessperson, Politician

Umaru Tanko Al-Makura (born November 1952) is a Nigerian businessman and politician and also a former governor and senator in Nasarawa State in the All Progressive Congress (APC).

He was elected as a senator in 2019.

== Background ==
Al-makura was born around 1952 in Lafia, Nasarawa State as a member of the Gwandara ethnic Group.

He attended Dunama Primary School, Lafia (1959–1966), Keffi Teacher's College (1967–1971) and then Government Teachers College of Education, Uyo (1972–75). For a short period in 1975 he was an Assistant Producer at the Broadcasting Corporation of Northern Nigeria. He then went to Ahmadu Bello University, Zaria (1975–1978), graduating with a Bachelor of Education Degree.

For his National Youth Service he was a teacher at the Government College, Makurdi.

In 1978 he formed Almakura Nigeria Limited, importing and servicing agricultural and industrial machinery. Later he ventured into real estate and property development as owner and chairman of Ta'al Nigeria Limited, with properties in Abuja, Lagos, Kano and Washington, DC, United States. He owns THE WAVE, a 5 star Hotel presently under construction in Abuja and the Ta'al Conference Hotel, Lafia.

== Political career ==
In 1980, Almakura became the youth leader of the National Party of Nigeria (NPN) in the old Plateau State.

He was elected to the constitution Assembly of 1988–89, representing the Lafia–Obi Federal Constituency of what is now Nasarawa State.

He was state secretary of the National Republican Convention (NRC) party in Plateau State from 1990 to 1992.

Al-makura was a founding member of the People's Democratic Party (PDP) in Nasarawa State in 1998.

Al-Makura has an estimate net worth of $290 million and he defected from the PDP after losing the primary elections for the Nasarawa Governor competition.

Al-Makura was elected Governor of Nasarawa State, Nigeria on 26 April 2011, running on the Congress for Progressive Change (CPC) ticket.

He defeated the incumbent governor, Aliyu Akwe-Doma of the PDP.

== Impeachment struggle ==
On 14 July 2014 the Speaker of the Nasarawa State House of Assembly gave a notice of impeachment to the Clerk of the House to serve on Tanko Al-Makura. The Clerk was told to serve the notice on Al-Makura either directly or through the media. The document contained allegations of gross misconduct and was signed by twenty of the twenty four Assembly members.

The impeachment was supported by the twenty Peoples Democratic Party (PDP) members but opposed by the four All Progressive Congress (APC) members. On 17 July the House of Assembly decided that the impeachment notice would be served via the media, since the governor had been evading personal service.

On 20 July 2014 it was reported that the Nasarawa traditional rulers had called on both sides to refrain from holding rallies for or against the impeachment so as to avoid violence. On 23 July, four members of the Assembly tried to seize the speaker's mace to delay a motion to ask the Chief Judge of the state to set up a seven-person panel to review the allegations of gross misconduct. The members of the House met twenty minutes later and passed the motion by twenty votes against four.

== Corruption allegations and detainment by the EFCC ==
On July 28, 2021, the Premium Times reported that the Economic and Financial Crimes Commission had arrested Al-Makura and his wife, Mairo over "alleged breach of trust and misappropriation of funds" during Al-Makura's tenure as Governor of Nasarawa State. Later that day, Premium Times reported that the arrest may have been the result of an investigation into suspicious transactions involving the bank accounts of the couple and their businesses. Reportedly, large transfers of state government money were sent to a company owned by Al-Makura and his wife raising concerns over a conflict of interest along with suspicious transfers from state government contractors to 55 different accounts controlled by Al-Makura and his wife leading to allegations of bribery and money laundering. The next day, Al-Makura released a statement through his chief press secretary Danjuma Joseph which claimed that the Al-Makuras were not arrested, instead that they were invited "to give his [Umaru Tanko's] own side of the story to some petitions written against him." The statement also quoted Al-Makura saying, "the rumours [of the arrest] surprised me and far as I am concerned, it is baseless."

== See also ==
- Nasarawa State Judiciary
- List of governors of Nasarawa State
