= Kokona =

- LGA
- Interactive map of Kokona
- Location in Nigeria
- Coordinates: 9°0′0″N 8°03′0″E
- Country: Nigeria
- State: Nasarawa State
- Headquarters: Garaku

Government
  - Abaga Toni: Lawrence Sylvester Ayih

Area
  - Total: 1,844 km^{2} (712 sq mi)

Population (2006)
  - Total: 109,749
  - Density: 59.52/km^{2} (154.1/sq mi)
- Time zone: UTC+1 (WAT)
- Postal code: 961

Kokona is a Local Government Area in Nasarawa State, Nigeria. Its headquarters are in the town of Garaku.

It has an area of 1,844 km^{2} and a population of 109,749 at the 2006 census.

The postal code of the area is 961.

Kokona local government area is home to the Bassa people and other tribes.
