= Akwanga =

Akwanga Kpange Mada Kasa
- LGA and town
- Nickname: AK
- Motto: Mada Sei Gir
- Interactive map of Akwanga
- Location in Nigeria
- Coordinates: 8°55′0″N 8°23′0″E
- Country: Nigeria
- State: Nasarawa State

Area
  - Total: 996 km^{2} (385 sq mi)

Population (2006)
  - Total: 513,930
  - Density: 516/km^{2} (1,340/sq mi)
- Time zone: UTC+1 (WAT)
- Postal code: 960

Akwanga is a town and Local Government Area in Nasarawa State, Nigeria.

It has an area of 996 km^{2} and a population of 513,930 at the 2006 census. The postal code of the area is 960.

== Languages ==
Akwanga is predominantly occupied by the Mada language speaking people, however, [Plateau languages] are spoken in and around Akwanga. Plateau language groups surrounding Akwanga town, listed clockwise, are Koro, Hyamic, Ndunic, Alumic, Ninzic, Eggonic, and Jilic.

== Education ==
Akwanga is considered the centre of education in Nasarawa state for its wide array of primary, secondary, and tertiary institutions. Akwanga is home to a famous and well-known missionary school like Rishama Comprehensive College, Mada Hills Secondary School, Hosanna Academy secondary school, Solid Foundation Academy, the prestigious Shepherd's International College, Hope Academy Secondary School, Summit Children Academy/Isachar High School, ShanPePe Destiny International Schools, Destiny Kids Academy, Bright Model Academy, Akwanga South Primary School, the private co-educational, Christian boarding school; College of Education; Hills College of Education; NACABS Polytechnic; and School of Health, amongst many others. Akwanga has the highest number of schools in Nasarawa State.

== Climate ==
In Akwanga, the rainy season is warm, oppressive, and overcast and the dry season is hot and partly cloudy. .
