= Awe, Nigeria =

Awe
- LGA and town
- Interactive map of Awe
- Location in Nigeria
- Coordinates: 7°48′N 4°00′E
- Country: Nigeria
- State: Nasarawa State

Government
  - Type: Local Government Administration

Area
  - Land: 2,800 km^{2} (1,100 sq mi)

Population (2005)
  - Total: 116,080
  - Density: 41/km^{2} (110/sq mi)
- Time zone: UTC+1 (WAT)

Awe is a town and Local Government Area in Nasarawa State, Nigeria. Awe has a population of 116,080 (2005 estimates) and total land mass is 2,800 square kilometres (1,100 sq mi)

The postal code of the Local Government is 951103, 951104, 951105.

== Climate ==
The temperature in the wet season is oppressive, while the dry season is humid and partly cloudy, resulting in a hot year-round climate.
