= Obi, Nasarawa State =

Obi
- Town and LGA
- Interactive map of Obi
- Location within Nigeria
- Coordinates: 8°22′N 8°46′E
- Country: Nigeria
- State: Nasarawa State

Government
  - Osuko: Aliyu Dangiwa Ogiri Orume

Area
  - Total: 967 km^{2} (373 sq mi)

Population (2006)
  - Total: 148,874
  - Density: 154/km^{2} (399/sq mi)
- Time zone: UTC+1 (WAT)
- Postal code: 951

Obi is a town and Local Government Area in Nasarawa State, Nigeria. it other towns include Adudu Emirate, Agwatashi, Daddare, Jenkwe, Duduguru, Agyaragu, Tudun Adabu, Gude, and Riri.

It has an area of 967 km^{2} and a population of 148,874 at the 2006 census.

The postal code of the area is 951.

== Climate ==
Temperatures range from 18 °C (64 °F) to 36 °C (96 °F), rarely dropping below 14 °C (58 °F) or rising beyond 39 °C (102 °F), and the weather is typically partly cloudy and overcast throughout the year.

=== Temperature ===
Obi experiences high temperatures on a regular basis; March is the hottest month with a high of 36 °C (96 °F).
