= Keffi =

Coordinates: 8.8464°N 7.8733°E

- LGA and Town
- Keffi
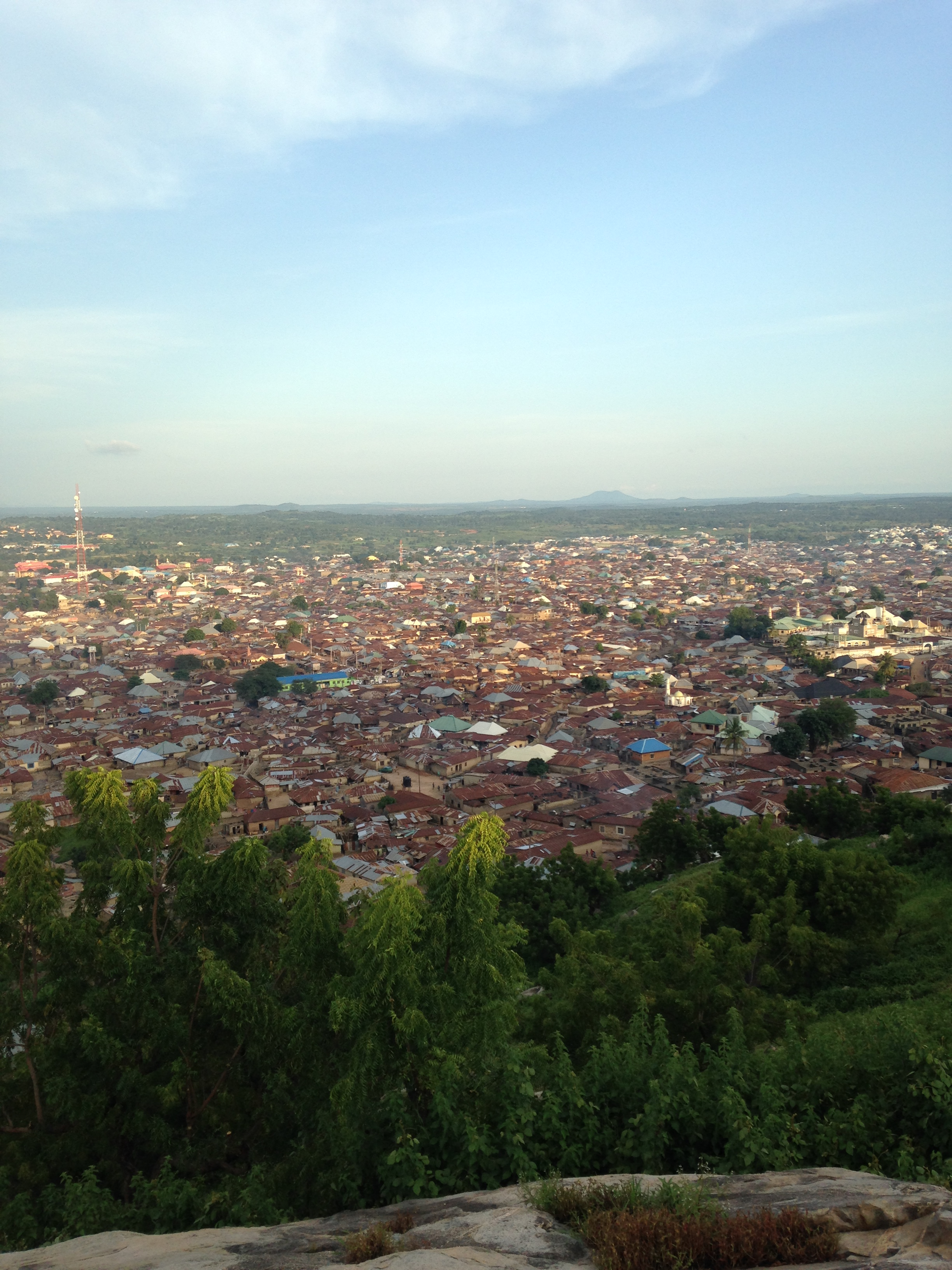
- Interactive map of Keffi
- Country: Nigeria
- State: Nasarawa State

Government
  - Type: Chairman Hon. Baba Shehu
  - Emir: Dr. Shehu Cindo Yamusa lll

Area
  - Total: 138 km^{2} (53 sq mi)
- Elevation: 0 m (0 ft)

Population (2006)
  - Total: 92,664
  - Density: 671/km^{2} (1,740/sq mi)
- Time zone: UTC+1 (WAT)
- Postal code: 961

Keffi is a town and local government area in Nasarawa State, north central Nigeria. Keffi is 50 kilometres (31 mi) from Abuja. Nasarawa State university is located along the Keffi-Akwanga expressway.

It has an area of 138 km^{2} and a population of about 92,664 at the 2006 census. The postal code of the area is 961.

== History ==
Keffi town was founded around 1802 by a Fulani warrior-leader, Abdu Zanga who took the title of 'emir'. His small dominion was subject to the Zaria emirate to which it had to pay an annual tribute of slaves.

In 1902, Keffi was the location of an incident that led to the British invasion of Northern Nigeria, after the "magaji", a representative of the Zaria sultan, killed a British officer. When the Magaji found refuge in Kano, this was the pretext for Frederick Lugard to invade the northern caliphate.

== Geography ==
Keffi LGA covers 138 square kilometres or 53 square miles in total and experiences average temperatures of 30 °C. The dry and wet seasons are the two main seasons in the region, and the average humidity in the LGA is 42 percent.

Keffi has a tropical wet and dry or savanna climate (Classification: Aw) and is 0 metres/feet above sea level. The district averages a yearly temperature of 30.27 °C (86.49 °F), which is 0.81% warmer than the national average for Nigeria. Keffi generally experiences 160.03 wet days 43.84% of the time and receives about 140.81 millimetres or 5.54 inches of precipitation annually.

In Keffi, the dry season is partly gloomy, the wet season is oppressive, and it's hot all year round. The average annual temperature ranges from 17 to 36 degrees Celsius (63 to 96 degrees Fahrenheit), rarely falling below 14 °C (57 °F) or rising over 39 °C (102 °F).

Between January 28 and April 13, a 2.5-month period known as the "hot season," with an average daily high temperature of more than 93 °F. With an average high of 96 °F and low of 73 °F, March is the hottest month of the year in Keffi.

The 3-to-4 month cool season, which runs from June 20 to October 11, has an average daily maximum temperature of less than 85 °F. With an average low of 63 °F and high of 90 °F, December is the coldest month of the year in Keffi.

=== Cloud cover ===
The average proportion of sky covered by clouds in Keffi varies significantly seasonally throughout the year.

The clearer season starts around November and ends around the ending of February.

December is the clearest month of the year in Keffi, with the sky remaining clear, or partly cloudy 53% of the time on average.

Beginning around February 26 and lasting for 8.4 months, the cloudier period of the year ends around November 7.

May is the cloudiest month of the year in Keffi, with the sky being overcast or mostly cloudy 84% of the time on average during this month.

== Economy ==
In the Keffi LGA, there are numerous mineral resources, including those for tin and columbite. Crops including millet, sorghum, yams, and cotton are also grown in the region, making farming another important economic activity there. The Keffi Cattle Market, which draws hundreds of thousands of buyers from across the country yearly, is one of the livestock markets located in Nasarawa State. Animal husbandry and handicrafts are two other significant economic pursuits of the residents of Keffi LGA. Additionally, Keffi is home to numerous officially and privately owned banks, hotels, and other institutions.

== Towns ==
Towns and villages under the Keffi Local Government Area are:

- Angwan Iya
- Angwan Rimi
- Anguwan Jaba
- Anguwan Maiganga
- Anguwan-Lambu
- Angwan Salabu
- Dan Dabi
- Fagidi
- Gangare Tudu
- Ganta
- Gidan-Kare
- Jigwada
- Kaibo Mada
- Keffi East
- Kofar Goriya
- Liman Abaji
- Saura
- Sabon Gari
- Tila
- Tunayi
- Yar Kadde
- Yara

== Notable people ==
- Imaan Sulaiman-Ibrahim – Minister of State for Police Affairs
