= Nasarawa State =

State of Nigeria

Nasarawa
- State
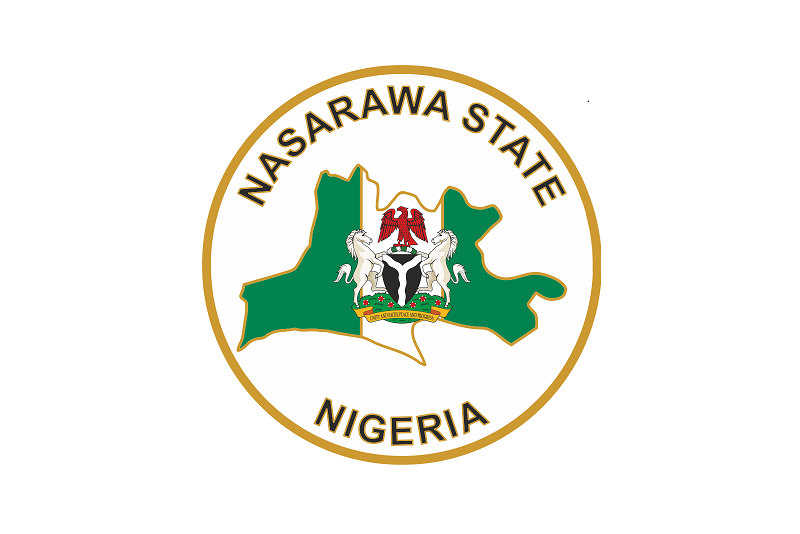
- Flag Seal
- Nicknames: Home of Solid Minerals
- Location of Nasarawa State in Nigeria
- Coordinates: 8°32′N 8°18′E
- Country: Nigeria
- LGA: 13
- Date created: 1 October 1996
- Capital: Lafia

Government
  - Body: Government of Nasarawa State
  - Governor: Abdullahi Sule (APC)
  - Deputy Governor: Emmanuel Akabe (APC)
  - Legislature: Nasarawa State House of Assembly
  - Senators: N: Godiya Akwashiki (SDP) S: Mohammed Ogoshi Onawo (PDP) W: Ahmed Aliyu Wadada (SDP)
  - Representatives: List

Area
  - Total: 26,256 km^{2} (10,137 sq mi)
  - Rank: 15th of 36

Population (2006)
  - Total: 1,869,377
  - Estimate (2022-03-21): 2,886,000
  - Rank: 30th of 36
  - Density: 109.9/km^{2} (285/sq mi)

GDP (PPP)
  - Year: 2021
  - Total: $12.01 billion 30th of 36
  - Per capita: $4,099; 17th of 36
- Time zone: UTC+1 (WAT)
- Postal code: 962101
- ISO 3166 code: NG-NA
- HDI (2022): 0.549 low · 23rd of 37
- Website: www.nasarawastate.gov.ng

Nasarawa is a state in the North Central region of Nigeria, bordered to the east by the states of Taraba and Plateau, to the north by Kaduna State, to the south by the states of Benue and Kogi, and to the west by the Federal Capital Territory. Named for the historic Nassarawa Emirate, the state was formed from the west of Plateau State on 1 October 1996. The state has thirteen local government areas namely, Nasarawa, Toto, Keffi, Karu, Kokona, Akwanga, Wamba, Nasarawa Eggon, Lafia, Obi, Awe, Doma and Keana with its capital in Lafia, located in the east of the state, while a key economic centre of the state is the Karu Urban Area—suburbs of Abuja—along the western border with the FCT.

Of the 36 states of Nigeria, Nasarawa is the fifteenth largest in area and second least populous with an estimated population of about 2.5 million as of 2016. Geographically, the state is mostly within the tropical Guinean forest–savanna mosaic ecoregion. Important geographic features include the River Benue forming much of Nasarawa State's southern borders and the state's far northeast containing a small part of the Jos Plateau.

Nasarawa State is inhabited by various ethnic groups, including the Koro and Yeskwa in the far northwest; the Kofyar in the far northeast; the Eggon, Gwandara, Mada, Buh, Ninzo, and Nungu in the north; the Alago, Goemai, and Megili in the east; Eloyi (Ajiri/Afo) in the south; the Tiv in the southeast; the Idoma in southwest; and the Bassa people, Gade and Gbagyi in the west while the Hausa and Fulani live throughout the state. Nasarawa is also religiously diverse with large followers of both Islam and Christianity while followers of Traditional or Native Religions have declined over the years due to conversions to the two Abrahamic religions.

In the pre-colonial period, the area that is now Nasarawa State was split up between various states with some states being tiny and village-based as others were part of larger empires until the early 1800s when the Fulani jihad annexed the region and placed the area under the Sokoto Caliphate as the vassal states of Keffi, Lafia, and Nassarawa. In the 1890s and 1900s, British expeditions occupied the area and incorporated it into the Northern Nigeria Protectorate. The protectorate later merged into British Nigeria in 1914 before becoming independent as Nigeria in 1960. Originally, modern-day Nasarawa State was a part of the post-independence Northern Region until 1967 when the region was split and the area became part of the Benue-Plateau State. After Benue-Plateau was split in 1976, what is now Nasarawa State became a part of the new Plateau State until 1996 when western Plateau was broken off to form the new Nasarawa State.

Economically, Nasarawa State is largely based around agriculture, mainly of sesame, soybeans, groundnut, millet, maize, and yam crops. Other key industries are services, especially in urban areas, and the livestock herding and ranching of cattle, goats, and sheep. The state has been beset by violence at various points throughout its history, most notably the ongoing conflict between herders and farmers primarily over land rights. Despite the conflict, Nasarawa has the nineteenth highest Human Development Index in the country and numerous institutions of tertiary education.

== History ==
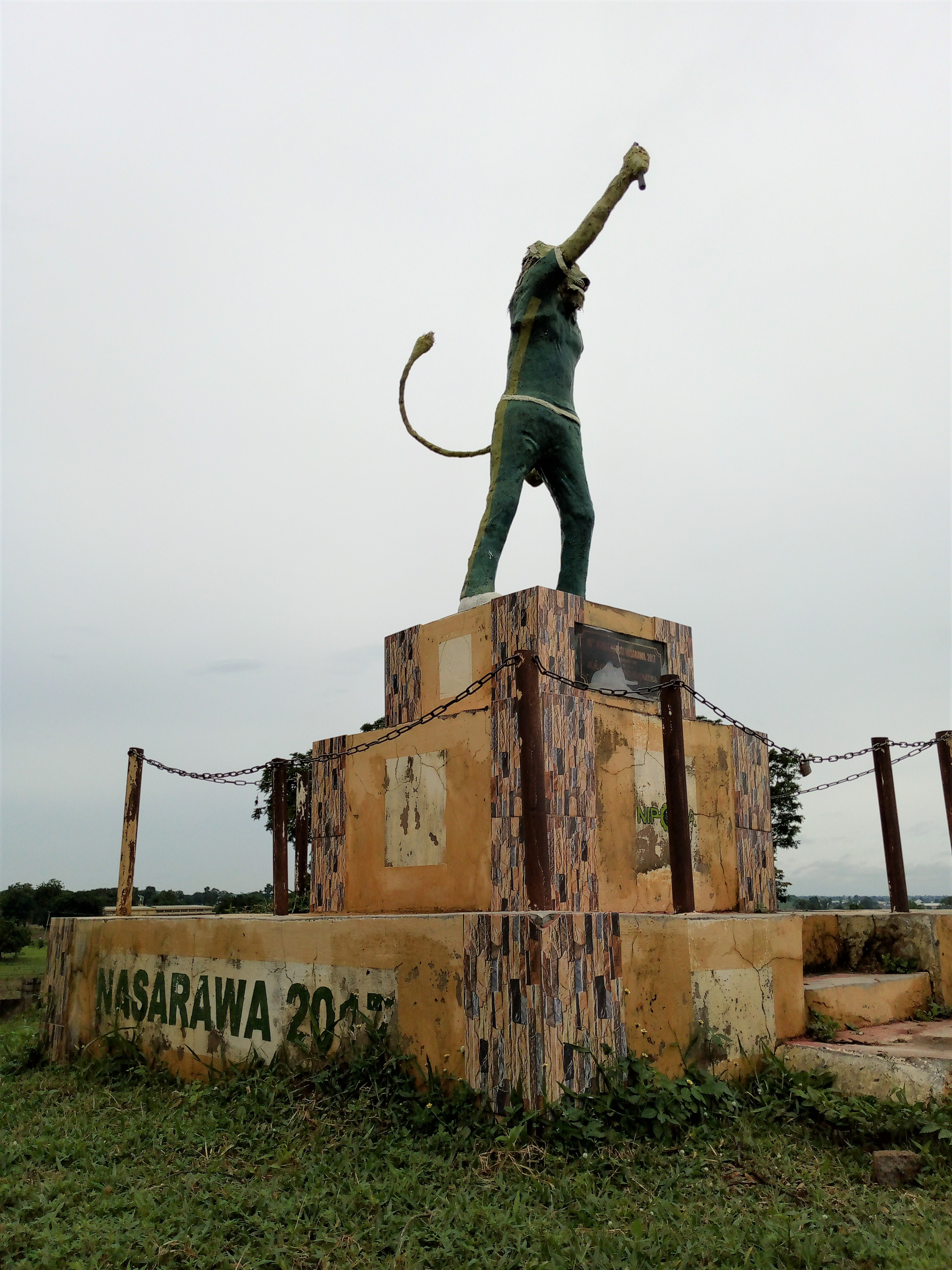
Nasarawa Mascot

Nasarawa was established on 1 October 1996 by the Sani Abacha government, splitting it from the western part of the today neighboring Plateau State which previously had contained both their territories.

== Geography ==
=== Climate ===
Nasarawa has a Tropical wet and dry or savanna climate. The city's yearly temperature is 29.39 °C (84.9 °F) and it is -0.07% lower than Nigeria's averages. Nasarawa typically receives about 136.71 millimetres (5.38 inches) of precipitation and has 155.37 rainy days (42.57% of the time) annually.

In Nasarawa, the dry season is humid and partially cloudy, and it is hot all year long. The wet season is oppressive and overcast. The average annual temperature ranges from 17 to 35 degrees Celsius or 63 to 95 degrees Fahrenheit, rarely falling below 14 °C (57 °F) or rising above 38 °C (101 °F).

From 29 January to 14 April, the hot season, with an average daily high temperature exceeding 93 °F, lasts for 2.5 months. Nasarawa's hottest month of the year is March, with an average high temperature of 95 °F and low temperature of 74 °F.

The 3.7-month cool season, which runs from 22 June to 13 October, has an average daily maximum temperature of less than 85 °F. Nasarawa experiences its coldest month of the year in December, with average lows of 64 °F and highs of 89 °F.

=== Boundaries ===
Nasarawa State is bounded to the north by Kaduna State for 169 km (105 miles), to the east by the states of Taraba for 109 km and Plateau for 219 km (136 miles), to the south by the states of Benue for 231 km, (mostly across the Benue River) and Kogi across the Benue River for 83 km, and to the west by Kogi for 68 km and the Federal Capital Territory for 156 km.

== Transport ==
Nasarawa has a network of roads within the state, which link all rural areas and major towns.

Federal Highways are

- A3 north from Benue State near Yerewata as the Makurdi-Jos Rd via Lafia and Wamba to Plateau State at Barimaw,
- A234 east from Abuja as the Keffi-Akwanga Rd via Keffi and Garaku to A3 at Akwanga.

Other major highways are

- the Lafia-Shandam Rd east to Plateau State at Ungwan Mai Samari,
- the Doma-Lafia Rd,
- the Loko-Nassarawa Rd north from Benue State across the Benue River at Loko by the 1835 m Loko-Oweto Bridge (2022),
- from the Abaji-Toto Rd to Nasarawa, * the Nasarawa-Keffi Rd.

Railways:

The Nigerian Railway Corporation (NRC) operates train services with the 1067 mm Cape gauge Eastern Line north from Makurdi in Benue State via Lafia to Kafanchan in Plateau State.

Airports: Lafia Cargo Airport.

== Population ==
Nasarawa State had a total population of 1,869,377 residents as of 2006, making the state the second least populated state in Nigeria after Bayelsa State.

== Air Pollution ==
Particulate matter, a dangerous air pollutant that can lead to bronchitis, asthma attacks, and other serious lung conditions due to chemical interactions in the environment, poses a threat to Nasarawa.

== Government ==
The Governor of Nasarawa State is the regional executive of Nasarawa. The state legislature, Nasarawa State House of Assembly, is located in the capital of Lafia.

== Local Government Areas ==
The State has three National Senatorial Districts, the South, North and West.

Nasarawa State consists of 13 Local Government Areas (shown with 2006 population figures):

Nasarawa West Senatorial District	716,802
Karu	205,477
Keffi	92,664
Kokona	109,749
Nasarawa	189,835
Toto	119,077
Nasarawa North Senatorial District	335,453
Akwanga	113,430
Eggon	149,129
Wamba	72,894
Nasarawa South Senatorial District	811,020
Awe	112,574
Doma	139,607
Keana	79,253
Lafia	330,712
Obi	148,874

List of current Local Government Area Chairmen.

== Languages ==
Languages of Nasarawa State listed by LGA:

LGA	Languages
Akwanga	Mada;Eggon; Ninzo; Numana;
Awe	Gwandara; Eggon; Goemai; Lijili; Tiv; Wapan
Doma	Alago; Eggon; Agatu; ;Tiv
keffi	Mada Gade; Eggon; Gbagyi; Gwandara; Koro Wachi
Karu	Gbagyi; Mada; Gwandara; Gade
Keana	Alago; Gwandara; Tiv
Kokona	Gwandara; Mada; Afo; Eggon; Ninzo
Lafia	Bare-Bari; Ake; Mada: Alago; Agatu; Eggon; Goemai; Gwandara; Tiv; Kofyar; Lijili; Wapan
Nasarawa	Afo, Mada; Tiv; Agatu; Alago; Basa; Egbira; Eloyi; Gade; Gbagyi; Gwandara; Eggon;
Nasarawa-Eggon	Eggon; Mada;
Obi	Alago; Tiv; Migili; Eggon; Gwandara
Toto	Egbura Agatu; Eggon; Gade; Mada;Gbagyi
Wamba	Alumu-Tesu; Ninzo: Mada; Rindre, Buh; Eggon; Kantana; Nungu; Toro

In Nasarawa State, there are 25 different ethnic groups. The major ones are Migili (Koro), Alago, Buh, Tiv, Mada, Gwandara, Kantana, Kulere, Arum, Kanuri, Hausa, Fulani, Gbagyi, Rindre, Afo, Eggon and Ebira

== Religion ==
The dominant religions in Nasarawa State are Islam and Christianity, although a certain amount of traditional religion is still practised. The Emir of Lafia, Sidi Dauda Bage, is the head of the Tijaniyya Sufi Order, and the 3rd highest Muslim leader in Nigeria.

About 11% Roman Catholic with 296,087 followers (2021) in the Diocese of Lafia (2000) with 15 parishes under Bishop David Ajang (2021), a suffragan of the Archdiocese of Abuja.

The Anglican Diocese of Lafia (1999) led by Bishop Godwin Adeyi Robinson (2017), is part of the Ecclesiastical Province of Abuja within the Church of Nigeria.

== Economy ==
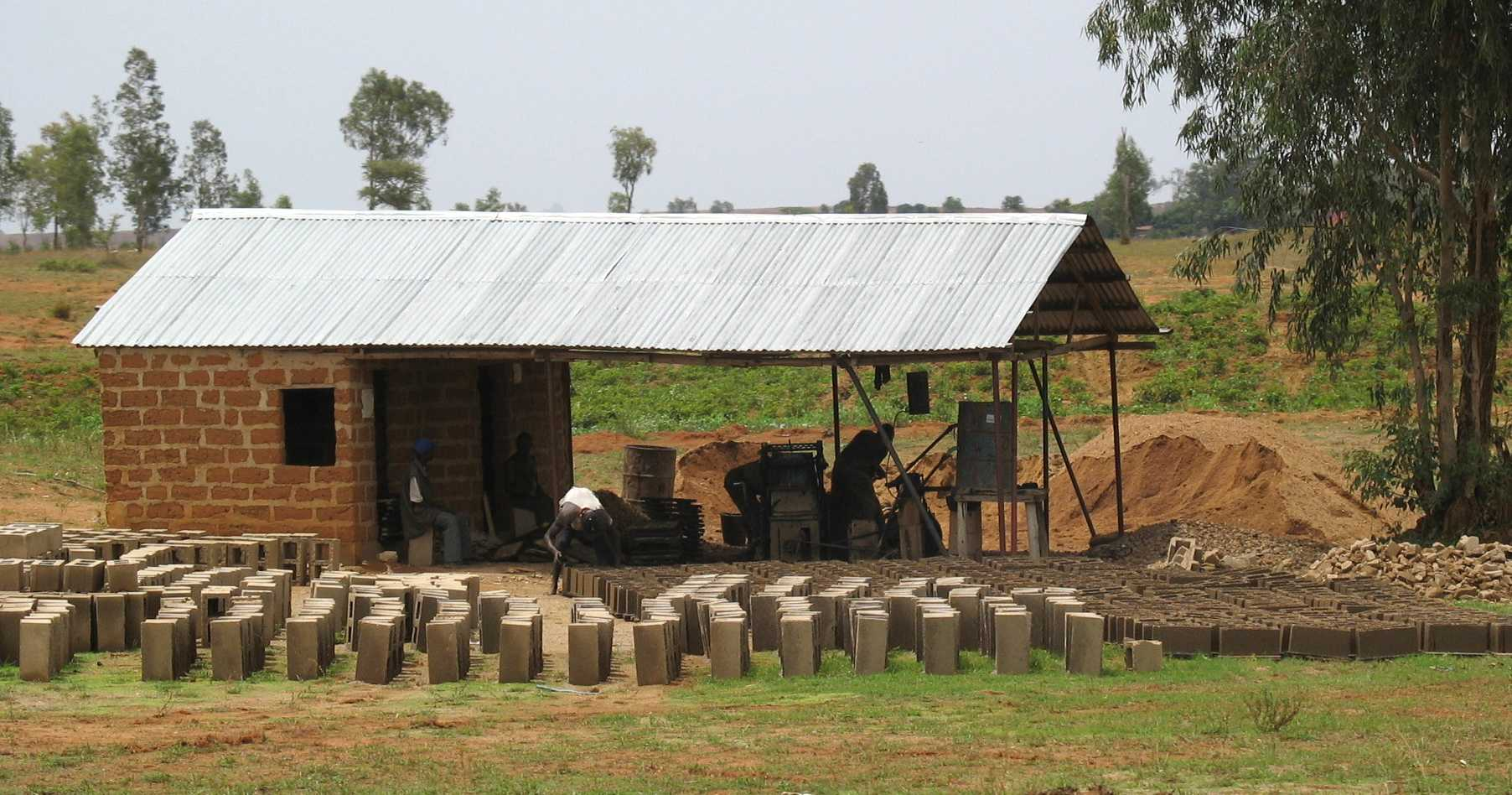
Concrete block factory in Nasarawa State.

Agriculture is the mainstay of Nasarawa State's economy with the production of a variety of cash crops throughout the year. It also contains various minerals such as salt, baryte, and bauxite, which are mostly mined by artisanal miners. These mineral resources are also found in Nasarawa State: Coal, Dolomite/Marble, coal, Sapphire, Talc, Quartz, Tantalite, Tourmaline, Mica, Chalcopyrite, Clay, Cassirite, Iron-Ore, Columbite, Galena and Feldspar

== Education ==
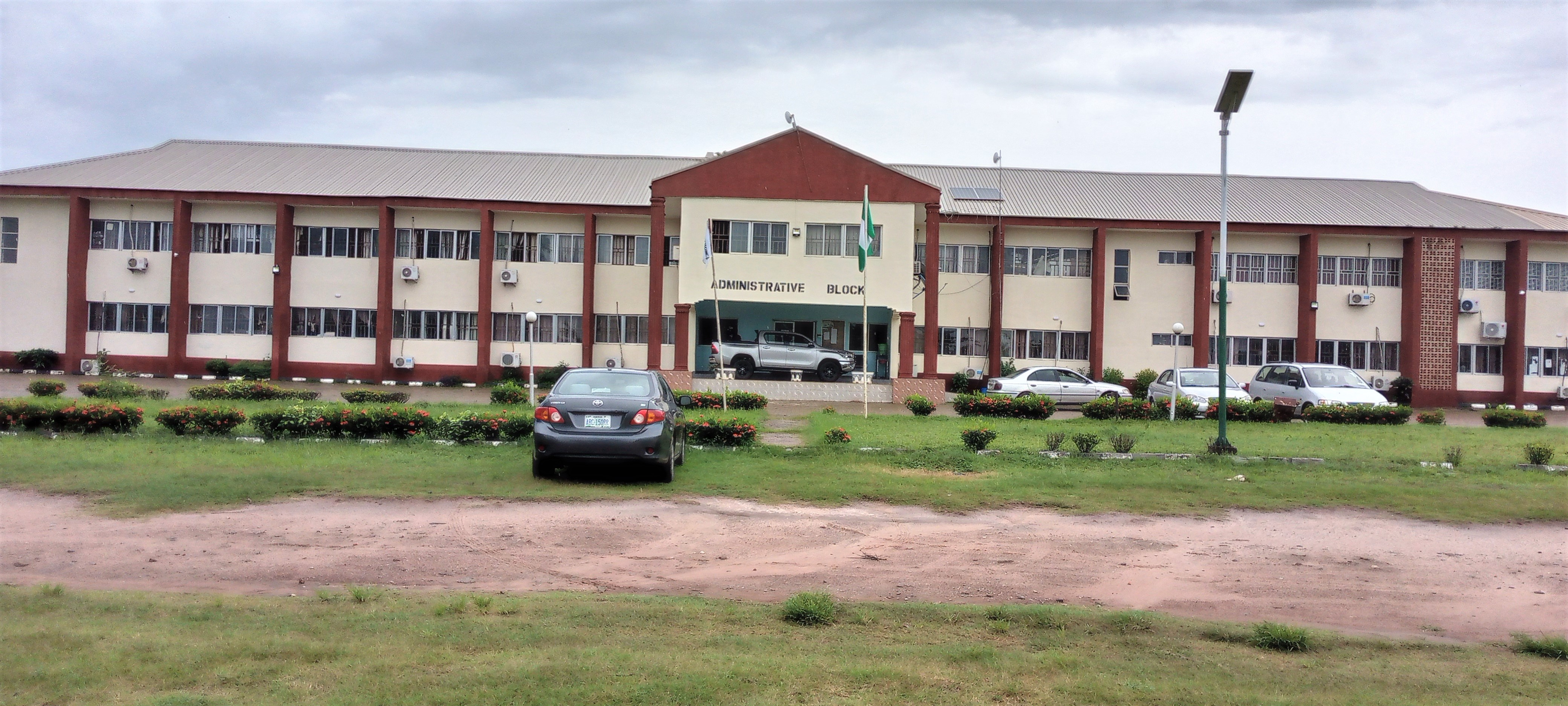
Federal Polytechnic Nasarawa, Nasarawa State, Nigeria

The state has a College of Education in Akwanga, Federal Polytechnic Nasarawa, Federal College of Education (Technical) Keana, College of Agriculture in Lafia, Isa Mustapha Agwai I Polytechnic Lafia, Nasarawa State University Faculty of Agriculture Lafia Campus, a newly established Federal University of Lafia, Mewar International University at Masaka, Bingham University at Karu, Hill College of Education Gwanje Akwanga, NACAP polytechnic Akwanga are colleges in the State. Command secondary school Lafia, Command secondary school Rinze, and many primary and secondary schools including the Federal Government Girls College, Keana, and Government Secondary School Usha Kadu are also located in the State.

== Tourism ==
Nasarawa State is home to the Farin Ruwa Falls in Wamba Local Government area of the state. Farin Ruwa falls is one of the highest falls in Africa.

The Salt Village in the Keana Local Government Area of the State produces naturally iodized salt from the lake located nearby. The town is also the cradle of Alago civilization, one of the major ethnic groups in the state. Also notable is the Eggon hills of the Eggon people which is situated around Nasarawa Eggon. This was the hills which the Eggon people had settled and established as an ancestral heritage as well.

Another tourist site in Nasarawa State is the Maloney Hill.

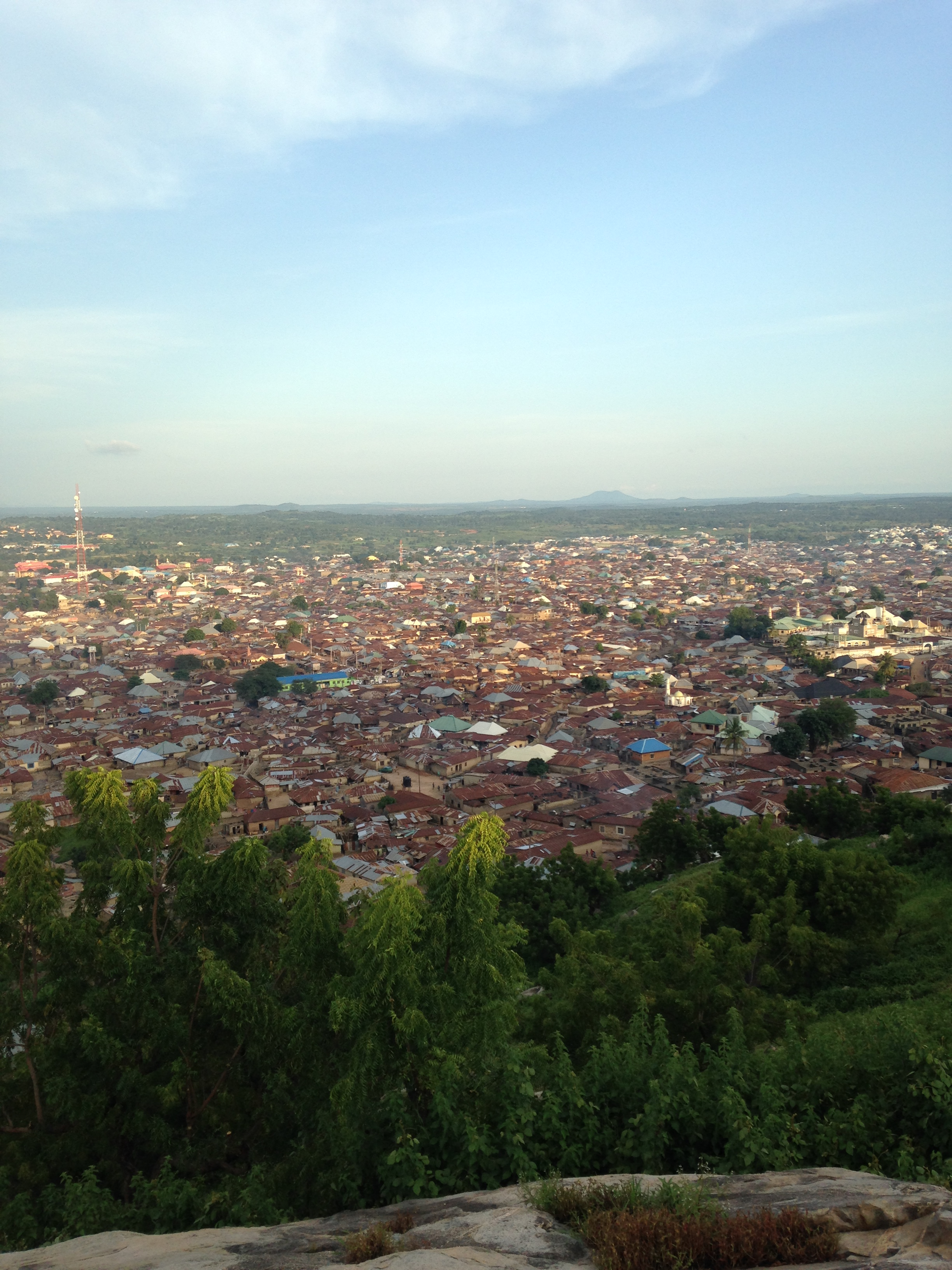
Keffi Town from the top of Maloney Hill

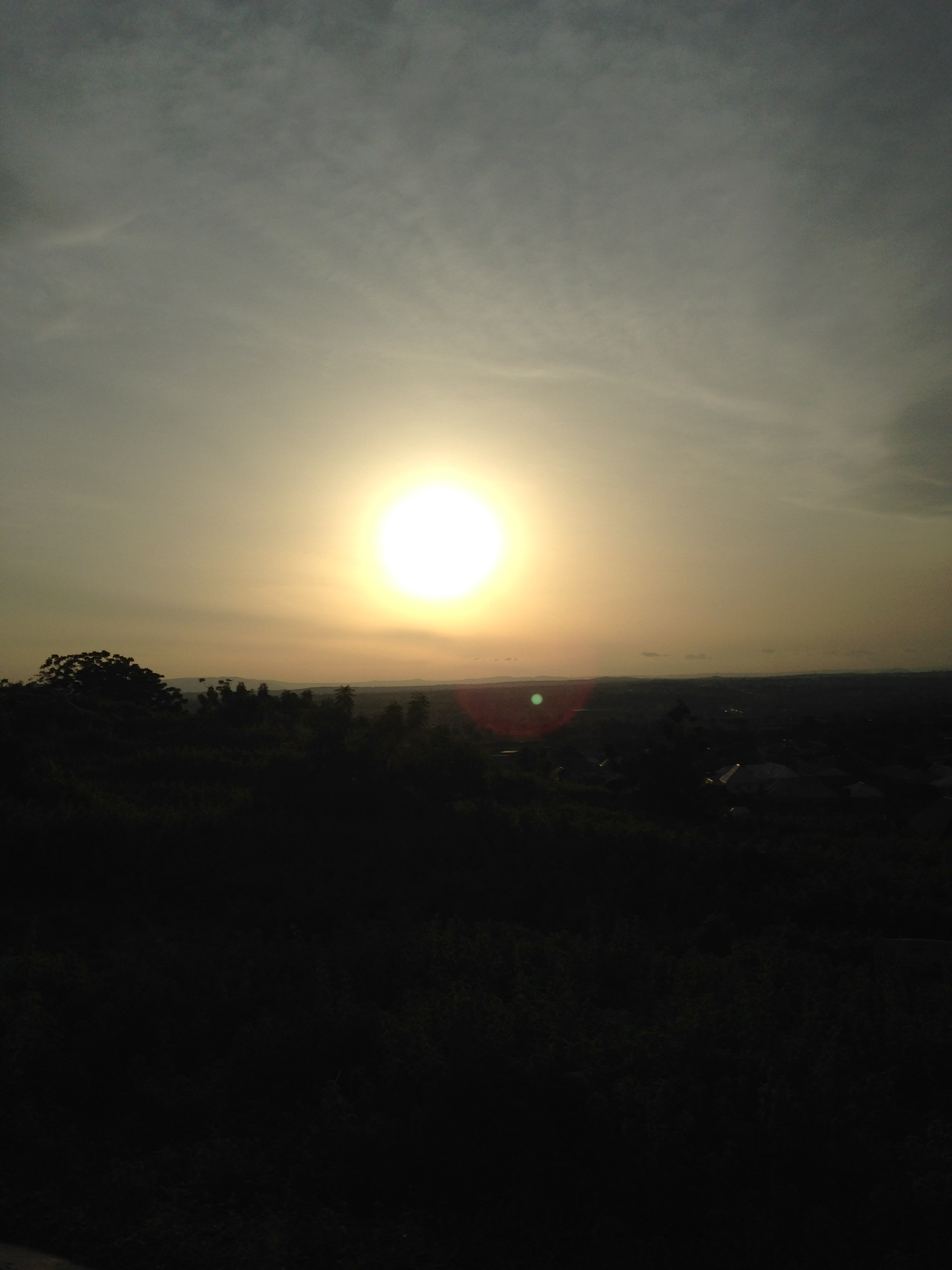
Sunset on Maloney Hill

== Notable people ==
- Ahmed Abdullahi - footballer
- Mohammed Hassan Abdullahi
- Abdullahi Adamu - former National Chairman, APC
- Suleiman Adokwe - former senator representing Nasarawa South Senatorial District
- Silas Ali Agara - Federal Commissioner, National Population Commission
- Aliyu Doma - former governor Nasarawa state.
- Abdulkarim Abubakar Kana- Former Attorney General of Nasarawa State
- Emmanuel Kucha - academician
- Umaru Tanko Al-Makura - former governor Nasarawa state
- Faisal Shuaib - Former executive director, NPHCDA
- Abubakar Sodangi - politician
- Imaan Sulaiman-Ibrahim – Current minister of Woman Affairs and former Director-General of NAPTIP
- Ahmed Wadada
