= List of villages in Nasarawa State =

This is a list of villages and settlements in Nasarawa State, Nigeria organised by local government area (LGA) and district/area (with postal codes also given).

== By postal code ==
LGA	District / Area	Postal code	Villages
Akwanga	Ancio Babba	960110	Ancho Babba; Anjagwa
Akwanga	Andaha	960102	Andaha; Gugyar; Mochu
Akwanga	AAngwan Zaria	960108	Ang Zaria; Moroa
Akwanga	Anjida	960111	Akwandar; Anjida; Bakin Kogi
Akwanga	Boher	960109	Boher; Nigo; Rija
Akwanga	Gudi	960105	Aricha; Gudi; Gwadi
Akwanga	Gwanje	960104	Gbuje; Gbunchu; Gwanje; Kambre; Kurmin Tagwaye
Akwanga	Nigha'an	960103	Ancho-Nigha'an; Anji; Arum; Beki-Riga; Katanza; Nidan; Numa; Pam-Pam
Akwanga	Nunku	960106	Gbujah; Goho; Nunku; Nunku Chun
Awe	Awe	951103	Abuni; Awe; Gadadima-Awe; Kanje; Kekura; Kofin Moye; Madakin Awe; Magaji M. Awe; Makwangiji Awe
Awe	Azaara	951104	Akiri; Arubagu; Azara; Mauakin Azara; Ribi; Wuse
Awe	Tunga	951105	Barkano; Baure; Booga; Gidrin Kadai; Hassan Gayam; Jagan Gari; Jangara; Tsohon Tunga; Tunga
Doma	Agwashi	950107	Adadu; Aguma; Agwashi; Akiwata; Akptta
Doma	Alagyy	950105	Alagye; Ana; Arege; Burumburum; Ruru
Doma	Doka	950104	Doka; Gidan Rai; Yelwa
Doma	Doma	950103	Awuse; Doma; Gwanshigid; Kwarra; Okuba; Osabonya; Osote; Wunge
Doma	Gidanrai	950106	Agyema; Akpanaja; Ankana; Equd Adori; Rukubi
Karu	Gitata	961106	Abam; Abui; Achak; Ago; Agwan Sauyi; Akwaf; Ang. Paparo; Ang. Payasha; Ang. Wayo; Anguwa-Ayaba; Angwa Maje; Angwan Alura; Angwan Gyara; Ankara; Ankoma; Ankomaa; Ankuta; Auta; Bagaji; Bunkusa; Dakuma; Dangwa; Dogon Daji; Duaro; Dutsen Gogo; Gaibo; Garamba; Gardi; Gid Bagobiri; Gidan Alhassan; Gidan Bugobiri; Gidan Dogo; Gidan Kiso; Gidan Mangoro; Gidan-Allura; Gunduma; Gwalaji; Iatara; Jaba Panda; Jemage; Jimagen Mada; Kajin; Kare; Kawo; Kogintaro; Kogon Masha; Kondoro; Kondoro-Yeskwa; Kuban; Kube; Kubere; Kuda; Kuda-Yeskwa; Kukan; Kukok-Gardi; Kukuri; Kunan; Kurmin Giwa; Kwagiri; Kwaso; Lengwanpa Koro; Padan Gwari; Panda; Panigbe; Paperi; Rafin Pa'a; Shadami; Shinkafa; Takalafia; Tanga; Tudu Uku; Tudun-wada; Zang Gitata; Zungon Gitata
Karu	Karshi	961104	Ang. Maiganga; Bakin Kogi; Dansa; Jijefe; Kabeni; Karshi; Katal; Kurafe; Kwatarma; Piyanku; Rafin Kwara; Sabon Layi; Takalafia
Karu	Karu	961105	Ang. Rana; Anta Ba Laifi; Aso Pada; Auta Gurgi; ,Bakin Ado I; Guata; Gurku; Jan Kanwa; Jikwai; Kabusu; Kalbo Mada; Karu; Katare; Kofa; Kuchikau; Kufe; Kugwaru; Kurman Daura; Lakwa; Liguda; Mararaban-Gurku; Masaka; Nassarawa Bada; Bakin Ado II; Timutna; Yayan Gwandara; Yelwan Sobo
Karu	Uke	961103	Agada; Ang Bako; Ang. Chediya; Ang. Gwandara; Ang. Jaba; Ang. Kade; Ang. Kura; Ang. Madugu; Ang. Malam; Ang. Saka; Ang. Shaho; Ang. Shamaki; Ang. Soji; Ang. Tandu; Ang. Toni; Ang. Tudu; Ang. Waya; Ang. Zakara; Badiko; Bagaji; Bakin Kogi; Bako; Dauduwa; Dorawa; Dorawan Kunu; Eshi; Gidan Biri; Gidan Kwaro; Gidan Liman; Gidan Rai; Gidan Saka; Gidan Sarki Noma; Gidan Shaho; Gora; Gunduma; Gwagwa; K/Gwandara; Kadaki; Katun Mada; Kawo; Keffi Shanu; Madubi; Magajin Gari; Murai; Nike; Roguwa; Saka; Shata; Takalafia; Tsakani; Tudun Wada; Tundun Uku; Uke; Yelwa
Keana	Aloshi	951107	Agaza; Aloshi; Omogade
Keana	Giza	951108	Agbari Agbashu; Akuna; Gaskawa; Giza; Odapu Ogaji
Keana	Kadarko	951109	Abubakar-Isaleku; Kadarko; Kwara
Keana	Keana	951106	Keana
Keffi	Keffi (Rural)	961101	Ang. Salabu; Anguwan Jaba; Anguwan Maiganga; Anguwan-Lambu; Dan Dabi; Fagidi; Ganta; Gidan-Kare; Jigwada; Kaibo Mada; Sabon Gari; Saura; Tila; Tunayi; Yar Kadde
Kokona	Kokona	961102	Agwada; Ajuye; Akolo; Akware; Amaha; Amba; Ambase; Ang. Arume; Ang. Doka; Ang. Magaji; Ang. Mai Nasara; Ang. Mai Sauri; Ang. Yaro; Ang. Zabuwa; Apawu; Arusu; Atama; Audun Galadima; Auguwan Kuramai; Bakin Ayeni; Bassan Zarangi; Bazariye; Dari; Doma; Endo; Garaku; Gate; Gidan Sarkin; Gidan-Mal Ugo; Gudindi; Gungu; Gunka; Gurgu; Hadar; Igwo; Jama-Agayan; Jenta; Kabugu; Kafanchan Mada; Kana; Kandare; Karu-Mada; Kodo; Kokona; Kubero; Kufan Gwari; Kundami; Kurmin Shinkaf; Kuture; Lamingan Janjala; Lokogoma; Mahuta; Marke; Maro; Maute; Ninkoro; Noma; Rafin Gabas; Sabon Gida; Sakwato; Shabu; Tatara Mari; Uken Bassa; Yelwan Bassa; Yelwan Mai-Taba
Lafia	Assakio	950102	Abu; Achigogo; Adogi; Agbulagu; Akura; Akuya; Alawa-Gana; Ambana; Andasin; Aridi; Arikya; Arugbadu; Ashangwa; Ashige; Assakio; Awuwa; Azuba; Barikin Abdullahi; Barkin Kogi; Danka; Fefe Ruwa; Gidan-Aiki Ajiga; Giddan Akeffi; Gilan Buka; Godam Mai; Gwayaka; Jibel; Keffi Wambai; Kiguna; Kireyi; Koro Kuje; Kwandere; Mankwar; Padaman-Bauna; Padan Bauwa-Alh Audu; Rafin Ganye; Randa; Sabon Gida; Shabu; Shimar; Tunga Nupawa; Ugah; Wanza; Wata; Wuyi; Zagyo; Zambala
Lafia	Barikin Abdullahi	950108	Angbako; Aridi; Ashapa; Awuma; Awuye; Bakin-Gudi; Keffi Wambai; Ruwaya; Takpa-Ozzi
Lafia	Lafia (Rural)	950101	Agabija; Agudu; Agyarag Yakubu; Agyaragu To; Akunza; Akurba; Akurba Asanya; Alakyo; Angwa Ayaba; Bassa; Bukan Allu; Bukan Buzu; Bukan Kwato; Bukan Sidi; Bukan Tambo; Chiroma; Gandu Sarki; Gayam; Gimare; Gudu Sarki; Kan Ashara; Kayarda; Kurikyo; Lachuce; Lahuce; Madagwa; Mararaba; Sabo Dale; Wakwa; Zanwa
Nasarawa	Loko	962103	Aguba; Aissa; Angewa; Ataga; Ayele; Aza; Bakono; Dora; Guto; Gwafa; Hamsin-Hamsin; Illa; Illshan-Kasa; Mai Yawa; Oshugun; Rafin Sita; Tunga; Uke; Zangon-Daji
Nasarawa	Nasarawa	962101	Agoi; Ara; Araba; Dansa; Gida Biri; Gidan S/Wari; Gogon Dutse; Gudigi; Gunki; Kampanu; Kurudu; Laminga; Marmara; Marrarabar Ara; Nahuche; Nassarawa; S/Garin; Saukan-Ara; Shamage; Tammah; Tulluwa; Zabutu; Zaku Bello; Zaku Sarki
Nasarawa	Udege	962102	Afura; Agam; Akum; Amaku; Andewayo; Apawu; Endo; Gidan Zabutu; Itta; Kama Otto; Kana; Marraraban; Odu; Ombi; Ube; Udege Kasa; Udegi; Udenin Gida; Udenin Magaji; Useni; Yelwa
Eggon	Alongani	960168	Agunji; Alogani; Angbaku - Krami; Angbaku Buba; Arikpa; Ezzen; Galle; Gbamze; Ogba; Ogbagi; Wakama; Wogan
Eggon	Mada Station	960169	Aboshon; Alushi; Awunza; Burum - Burum; Ekpan; Ekpon; Endehu; Gaji; Ginda; Igeah; Ikka; Kagbu Ero; Kudugba; Lambaga; Landama Onzu; Lizzin Keffi; Mada Station; Ubbe; Wachuku; Wana; Wangibi; Washo; Wata; Whazan; Wolaga; Wollon; Women; Wulko
Eggon	Umme	960167	Alizaga; Arugbadu; Bakyano; Eggon; Sako; Umme
Obi	Obi	951102	Adudu; Agwatashi; Akanga; Atabara; Daddere; Dedere; Obi
Obi	Zhemegli	951101	Abiuga; Agrugwa; Agwade; Agyaragu; Ajeregwa; Akaba; Akaleku; Akunza Migula; Akwanka; Angantiv; Angwan-Madaki; Ashiga; Ashipe; Atu Kwasa; Baba; Dazillah; Duduguro; Echiechene; Eregwa; Eshugu; Gidan Ausa; Gwadanya; Idevi; Kwashiri; Kyakale; Mutum Daya; Sabo; Tabula; Umah
Toto	Gada	962104	Abebasen; Akureba; Akwashi; Araba; Buga; Buke; Daji; Dajio; Dikko; Gada bake; Garagwa; Gombe; Gudun Karya; Gwargwada; Jaun; Karmo; Karmo Ganji; Kpembo; Kulo Sabo; Kunke; Loko-Goma; Madeki; Majaga; Muro; Nakuse; Offu; Pesun; Saukan Buga; Saukan-Kure; Segiya; Tudu-Uku; Warrakata; Zochi
Toto	Toto	962106	Adadu; Ajurawa; Akutu; Bakate; Biye; Chiji; Dare; Dumbeku-Toto; Gate; Gbwachi; Inyeji; Karbana; Kolo; Kuru; Ladaya; Rakpami; Rudu; Sadauna; Shaffa Abakwa; Shaffan Kwato; Shekara-Uku; Shinshinga-Nashi; Toto; Ugya; Ukya-Sabo; Zono
Toto	Umaisha	962105	Anda; Dausu; Egwa Pati; Fofuru; Iggi; Kaita; Karbana; Katakwa; Kein Yahu; Kokoto; Kpadebu; Kuwa; Ogbere; Shege; Sogane; Uffu; Umaisha
Wamba	Mama	960135	Ambaka; Amboga; Arum; Arum Sarki; Binna; Chini; Chugbu; Jimiboli; Jimiya; Jini Duffat; Jini Mut; Kado; Kam Lamo; Kanje; Kumurum; Kwarra; Lam Kire; Machai; Mangar; Mansseuge; Marhai; Muggu; Muttu; Shawai; Shua;Toff; Tsaro; Tumara; Turkwai; Ukambu; Ukanju; Ukolo; Yashi
Wamba	Wamba	960134	Angba; Angbo; Dechu; Gbagi; Gbata; Gbogi Ugu; Gbombu; Gbriji; Gbude; Gitta Barmo; Gitta Kasa; Gitta Klogba; Sisinbaki, Gitta Maisaje; Gitta Mbasha; Jidda; Klama; Konvah; Kose; Kurize; Kwanza; Lago; Langi; Maigauga; Nakere; Ninkada; Ogye; Ragga; Riuza; Ugure; Ungo; Utugu; Wado; Waja; Waji; Wamba; Wamba Kurmi; Wayo Arewa; Wayo Kudu; Wude Kurmi; Wude Kwano; Wuji

== By electoral ward ==
Below is a list of polling units, including villages and schools, organised by electoral ward.

LGA	Ward	Polling Unit Name			
Akwanga	Agyaga	Ninga; Ninga II; Ashe; Agyaga; Tapir; Unguwar Pah			
Akwanga	Anchobaba	Rija Sarki; Gbuwhen; Ancho Sarki; Ngare; U/Zaria I; U/Zaria II; Manveh I; Ikpon St. By House No. 20			
Akwanga	"Gwanje				
"	Gwanje; Gbuje; Gwadi; Aricha				
Akwanga	Ancho Nighaan	Ancho /Nighaan; Arum Gida; Nidan; Numan Kuchu			
Akwanga	Andaha	Andaha North; Andaha South; Andaha K/Hakimi; Katanza; Andaha Daji			
Akwanga	Nunku	Nunku; U/Makama; U/Dorowa; Andu			
Akwanga	Gudi	Motor Park; C. M. S Gudi; U/Dariya			
Akwanga	Moroa	C. M. S Moroa; B/Kogi; U/Yara; Anjida Sarki; Kwandar			
Akwanga	Akwanga West	U/Salihu; U/Galadima; Coe Akwanga; Police Station; Akwanga North Pri. School; Kofar Hakimi; Akwanga South			
Akwanga	Akwanga East	Akwanga Central; K/Tagwaye; Buku; Gbunchu; Mhss; Co-Operative; Kambre; Motor Park; U/Alago			
Akwanga	Ningo / Bohar	Ningo; Tabu; Ngambre; Ngache; Bohar Sarki			
Awe	Makwangiji	Baure Pri. School - I Pb; Baure Pri. School - II Pb; Viewing Centre Pb; Kosour - Ob; Kekura Pri. School -I Pb; Kekura Pri. School -II Pb; Kundu - Ob; Gindin - Kade - Ob; Ungwan Rogo - Ob; Kofar-Pada/Bunu			
Awe	Madaki	Kofar Habu - I Ob; Kofar Habu - II Ob; Kofar Gayam Statistic - Pb; Kofar Gayam - Ob; Awe South Pri. School - Pb; Kofar Sarki Wurji - Ob; Kafin Moyi - Ob; Jangar Gari I; Jangar Gari II; Akwate - Ob; Magaji TV Centre - Pb; Gidan Wurji Pri. School- Pb			
Awe	Jangaru	Jangaru Pri. School - Pb; Chiata - Ob; Ka'Ambe - Ob; Gindirawa - Ob			
Awe	Kanje/Abuni	Abuni Pri. School (Pb); Ung. Kwalla (Ob); Kanje Pri. School - Pb; Ung. Jukun - Ob; Anuku Pri. School - Pb; Ihuman Pri. School -I Pb; Ihuman Pri. Sch. II Pb			
Awe	Ribi	Ribi TV Centre - Pb; Ribi Pri. School - Pb; Kofar Sarki - Ob; Zanwa- Ob; Mankpe; Shankodi - Ob; Ungwan Kwalla - Ob; Ibi Alago - Ob; Jangwa Dispensary - Pb; Jangwa Pri. School - Pb			
Awe	Azara	Gidan-Wambai Pri. School - Pb; Maaji Azara - Ob; Rimin Sabo - Ob; Rugwagu - Ob; Ubandoma - Ob; Ung.- Galadima Azara - Ob; Kofar Magaji - Ob; Ung. Sarkin Yaki I; Ung. Sarkin- Yaki - II Ob; Jimi Azara - Ob; Ung. Gobirawa - Ob; Kofar Sarkin Kurum; Tafida - Ob; Gidan Soja - Ob; Gidan Upaver - Ob			
Awe	Wuse	Wuse Disp/Moyi -'A' Pb; Wuse Disp/Moyi -'B' Pb; Tsohon Wuse -Ob; Gidan Unande - Ob; Kumar - Pb; Gidan-Luka - Ob; Rijiyan Giwa - Pb; Saminaka - Ob; Dorowan-Wuse; Wuse TV Centre - Pb; Ungwan Audu - Ob; Ungwan Ubangari - Ob			
Awe	Akiri	Akiri Pri. School/Ang. Gishiri - I; Akiri Pri. School/Ang. Gishiri II; Kofar Sarki/Kuka - Ob; Tafida Silla - Ob; Nyensuwe - Ob; Ung. Tributu - Ob; Rugar -Hardo - Ob; Gidan Gwam - Ob; Usuwa Jigawa - Ob; Apiri Akiri - Ob			
Doma	Alagye	Anna Town O. P; M. S Gida O. P; K/M Anza/Damba/K/M/D O. P; Mudu Primary School; Ruttu O. P; Kofar Wakili 0. P; Pri. School Alagye O. P; K. W Mada O. P; Ruwan Baka O. P; Akarama O. P; Pankshin Doma O. P; Lamba			
Doma	Rukubi	K/Pada Agyema O. P; Agyema Pri. School P. B; Ozimaza Agyema O. P; Otiya O. P; Oluwa Koyima O. P; Rukubi Pri. School Pb; Ung. Kumburu 0. P; Andori Pri. School P. B; Ung Sarkin Bassa O. P; Abuja Ogo O. P; Ung Owuse Ijiwo O. P			
Doma	Agbashi	Pri. School Idadu P. B; Atandara O. P; Pri. School Agbashi P. B; G. S. S Agbashi Pb; Olegabogye O. P; Pri. School Iponu Pb; Kofar Sarkin Okpatta O. P; Gidan Jirrah Op; Kofar Adamu/Adagonye; Kaduna Bassa Op; Pri. Schoolzever Pb; Ategere Op; Ung. Bassa Okpata Op; Kofar Sarki Ose Ogiri			
Doma	Akpanaja	K/S Akpanaja Op; Dan Galadima Op; Lsb Akpanaja Pb; Apringbo Op; Ochepe Op; Obendo Op; Olegokpa Op; Gidan Bassa Azaya Op			
Doma	Ungwan Sarki Dawaki	Kofar Agina Op; Andoma Pri. School Pb; Kofar Oshata Ogande Op; Ung. Liman Op; Kofar Olobu Op; Kofar Barde Op; Kofar Galadima Op; Otugewo Op; Pri. School Iwashi Pb; K/Sarkin Alagye Op; Odorogya Op; K/Magajin Gari Op; K/Osikpa Op; K/John Ogah Op; K/Osabo Agabi Op			
Doma	Madauchi	K/Madauchi Op; K/Liman Bakashi Op; K/Massalachi Op; K/Mallam Yaro Op; K/Pakachin Doma; Kauran Sarki Op; K/Mallam Aboki Op; K/Liman Gari Op; K/Babaji Op; K/Adara Olokpa Op; K/Alh. Adamu Ung. Nupawa Op; K/Osogbe Op; Kofar Alhaji Rilwanu Op			
Doma	Ungwan Dan Galadima	Kofar Alhaji J. Liman Op; Kofar Alhaji H. Ogu Op; Kofar Alhaji Sani Ogah Op; Kofar Alhaji Waziri; Kofar A. Okudu Op; Kofar A. Abari Bunu Op; Kofar Sanke; Gidan Aya Op; Rest House Pb; R. C. M Pri. School I; R. C. M Pri. School II; Kofar Okuba Op; Ogande Wuri (Kofan); Kofar Adeka Sarki Noma Op; Kofar Baban Keke Op			
Karu	Aso / Kodape	Kodape Pri. School - Pb; Tudun Wada Pri. School - Pb; Kudu Luvu - Op; Koya - Op; Jen Kokoro - Op; Ebba - Op; Aso - Op			
Karu	Agada/Bagaji	Bagaji Pri. School - Pb; Gidan Bala - Op; Gidan Dogara - Op; Gidan Gwandara - Op; Gataku - Primary School; Angwan Zakara Pri. School; Angwan Shamaki - Op; Gora Pri. School; Gunduma Pri. School - Pb; Madubi - Op; Ang. Tara Pri. School - Pb; Army Barracks O- Op; Ang. Sa'Aka/ Zabiru - Op; Dorowa - Op			
Karu	Karshi I	Kwadaki - Op; Karshi Pada - Op; Piyanko Bole - Op; Karshi Orozo - Op; Gidan Shanana - Op			
Karu	Karshi II	Kowa Yarda; Rafin Kwara -Op; Jijipe; Kurape Primary Sch.; Bakin Kogi; Takalafiya Primary Sch.; Takalafiya I; Ara Sabo; Kwatarma			
Karu	Kafin Shanu/Betti	Gwaya Pri. School - Pb; Kawo Makaranta - Pb; Takalafiya Zazzau - Op; Takalafiya Fulani; Gwagwa - 0p; Ang. Gwandara; Ang. Chediya; Ang. Toni; Tsakani; Dorowa - Op; Betti / Rugan Jaba - Op; Ang Mallam - Op; Nike Primary Sch.			
Karu	Tattara/Kondoro	Tattara Pri. School I; Tattara Pri. School II; Ang. Ayaba Primary Sch.; Jamaga Mada Primary School; Dutsen Gogo; Abui - Op; Ankuta Pri. School - Pb; Akwap - Op; Ashot - Op; Kuda - Op; Kondoro Yeskwa - Op; Kondoro Hausawa; Camp - Op			
Karu	Gitata	Gitata Pri. School (Pb); Sabon Kasuwa Gitata; Zango Pri. School Pb; Rafin Mpah Pri. School (Pb); Tudun Uku Pri. School (Pb); Chimpa Ajeye Primary Sch.; Dauro Pri. School (Pb); Takalafiya (Op); Paperi Pri. School (Pb); Buzi Pri. School (Pb)			
Karu	Gurku/Kabusu	Gwandara I; Gurku Gwandara II; Gurku Gwandara III; Gurku Gwari Pri. School - Pb; Chakuwa Pri. School - Pb; Kabusu Pri. School - Pb; Kpanda - Op; Makurdi -Op; Bagoje - Op; Kugwaru Pri. School - Pb; Katanyi Pri. School - Pb; Gbaranda Pri. School - Pb			
Karu	Panda / Kare	Angwan Pa Iche - Op; Kubang - Op; Chandap; Ago - Op; Kukan - Op; Shinkafa - Primary School; Kare Primary Sch.; Gwallaji - Op; Ang. Pa. Koro; Panda Pri. School - Pb; Ankoma Pri. School - Pb; Kube Primary Sch.; Koso - Op; Kukuri - Op; Jaban Panda - Op			
Karu	Karu	Karu Central Pri. School; Karu Police Station Junction - Op; Dagbadna - Op; Karu Pada - Op; Nyanyan Gbagyi Pri. School; Bakin Ado Pri. School; Mararaba Garage I; Mararaba Garage II; Mararaba Sharp Corner - Op; Mararaba White House - Op; Masaka Pri. School; Masaka Garage; Nyanya Gwandara Primary Sch.			
Keana	Iwagu	Kofan Wondo; Gidan Akowodo; Dispensary Iwagu; Kofan Galadima; Kofan Oladiya; Lgea Primary School Kuduku - Op; Kofan Sarki Onarikpe (A) - Op; Kofan Sarki Onarikpe (B) - Op; Kofan Ibrahim Orji Onarikpe - Op; Kofan Ugbanji Basa Doma - Op			
Keana	Amiri	Lgea Primary School Keana South - Pb; Kofan Sarki Sabo - Op; Kofan Ibrahim Arigu - Op; Kofan Otoshi - Op; Kofan Ishishi - Op; Kofan Olakudu - Op; Kofan Chiata Village - Op			
Keana	Obene	Lgea Primary School Obene (A) - Pb I; Lgea Primary School Obene (B) - Pb I; Kofan Wondo - Op; Kofan Demka - Op; Kofan Oshafu - Op; Kofan Omokpa - Op; Gidan Gbamma; Lgea Primary School Uluji			
Keana	Oki	Central Pri. School (A) - Pb; Kofan Zaki Solomon Taciya Village Primary Sch. - Op; Kofan Isono - Op I; Kofan Abdullahi Agade; Kofan Oseku; Central Primary School (B); Kofan Ayizeka; Kofan Malla Magaji			
Keana	Kwara	Kofan Aboshi Akuki Kwara; Kofan Abubakar Akuki, Kwara; Central Primary School Kwara; Kofan Sheria Renis; Lgea Primary School Ansa; Kofan Abagyo Akuki; Kofan Abu Tudun Habu			
Keana	Aloshi	Lgea Primary School, Aloshi; Government Secondary School, Aloshi; Kofan Sarki Aloshi; Kofan Zariya; Lgea Primary School Panjogo			
Keana	Agaza	Kofan Sarki Agaza; Kofan Ikiwa; Central Primary School (A); Central Primary School (B); Lgea Primary School Ishoho; Lgea Primary School Owena			
Keana	Madaki	Ari; Kofan Madaki; Kofan Yunusa; Kofan Wakaso; Kofan Ozegya; Central Primary School Giza (A); Central Primary School Giza (B); Lgea Primary School, Kalachi; Lgea Primary School, Ajo			
Keana	Giza Galadima	Kofan Sarki Umaru; Kofan Iseke; Kofan Madaki Agbo; Kofan Sarki Orume; Kofan Mamman; Lgea Primary School Giza West (A); Lgea Primary School Giza West (B); Lgea Primary School, Kpalev			
Keffi	Angwan Iya I	Kofar Mallam Sadau - Op; Kofar Hausa Pri. Sch.- Pb; Kofar Hausa Primary Sch. (Pb); Angwan Kaura Pri. Sch. Pb; Gindin Dutse - Op; Ang Fadama - Op			
Keffi	Angwan Iya II	Gdss Yelwa; Grade II Area Court; District Head Office; Gangaren Tudu (Racc); Yelwan Bello - Op; Yelwan Tofa - Op			
Keffi	Tudun Kofa T. V	Pada - Op; Prison Service; Kadarko - Op; Tudun Kofa - Op; L. G. C Guest House - Op; Ang. Nupawa - Op; Kofar Sallau Modibbo Op			
Keffi	Gangare Tudu	Gangaren Tudu - Op; Ang. Tiv - Op; Gangaren Masaka - Op; Kofar Alh. Ahmadu Sabon Gari; Ang. Waje - Op; Tudun Wada - Op			
Keffi	Keffi Town East / Kofar Goriya	Kofar Goriya - Op; Kofar Kokona - Op; G. T. C. Gate - Op; St. Peters - Pb; Hospital Gate - Op; Baptist Pri. School - Pb; Sabon Layi Ta Gabas - Op; Ang. Nepa - Op			
Keffi	Yara	Yara - Op; Yara - Zana - Op; Gangaren Yara - Op; Sabon Layi Ta Yamma - Op; Tsohon Tasha - Op; Ahmadu Maikwato - Pb; Bakin Kasuwa - Op			
Keffi	Ang. Rimi	Ecwa Pri. School - Pb; Ecwa Primary School; Kofar G/Liman - Op; Makera - Op; Ang. Rimi - Op; Ang. M'Ada - Op; Police Station - Pb; Kofar Masa; G. R. A (G. C) - Pb; Gra (A 1) - Pb; Kofar Na Malama - Pb			
Keffi	Jigwada	Jigwada - Op; Ang. Jaba; Sabon Gida - Op; B. C. G - Op; Kaibo Mada Pri. School			
Keffi	Liman Abaji	Kofar Alkali Mouktar - Op; Kofar M/Ladan - Op; Tsohon Kasuwa Ta Gabas - Op; Yankari - Op; Kofar Hausa Ta Gabas - Op; Gangaren Aboki - Op; Gangaren Aboki			
Kokona	Agwada	Agaba; Agboya; Agaide; Endo/Endo Madaki; Agbode; Agbagya; Igwo Sarki; Igwo Madaki; Agaza; Jentar; Ang/Arume			
Kokona	Koya / Kana	Kana; Shata; Essa/Bisa; Asayi; Okepa; Apawu / Kwara; Agbowa; Onugba; Ozoku/Egbe; Kolu Idete; Oriki; Agbolo; Erigo			
Kokona	Bassa	Bassa Pri. School; Bassa Hausawa; Bassa Mission; Ang / Jalla/; Ang / Waje /; Uke Bassa; Jigawa			
Kokona	Kokona	Kokona Primary School; Anguwa Doka; Sabon Gida; Pam / Sango Barau; Anguwa Pah; Bokoko; Karu Mada; Ung. Malam Magaji			
Kokona	Kofar Gwari	Kofar Gwari; K/Gwari Pri. Sch./; Shabu; Jamaa Gayan; Ang. Tsira; Dokar Daji; Bakin Ayini I; Bakin Ayini II			
Kokona	Ninkoro	Ajuye; Mai Kurada Laminga; Moroa I; Moroa II; Moroa III; Ninkoro; Ambasi; Kodon Gwandara; Gidan Allan; Ang/Sarki; Saura Kirya			
Kokona	Hadari	Hadari; Mahuta; Ang. Maisauri; Ang. Jarmai; Mante; Marke; Sabon Gida; Mayo; Kurame I; Kurame II; Yelwa Maitaba; Kudami			
Kokona	Dari	Dari Pri. School I; Dari Pri. School II; Amaha; Arusu I; Arusu II; Gurku; Gurku Asoso; Angoro; Mandara			
Kokona	Amba	Amba Pri. School; Amba/Kyabisi; Okpake I; Kandere; Sabon Ruwa; Ang/Kuka I; Ang/Kuka II			
Kokona	Garaku	Garaku Primary School I; Garaku Primary School II; Agaba; Kofar Magaji Alade; Fegyen Angwa; Ang/Gimba; Tattara; Ang./Habu; Ang./Takwa; Kurmin Shinkafa; Kubere; Ang. Barau; Ang/Maina - Sara; Kama Madaki	Kokona	Yelwa	Yelwa center, Yelwa pri. school, Sakwato, Afo Rami, Atashini tiv, Ruwa Doma, Akwure,
Lafia	Adogi	Adogi Pri. School - Pb; K/Ashara - Op; Dispensary - Pb; Ung. Musa - Op; Ung. Amadi - Op; Agyaragu Koro - Op; Kirayi - Op; Akura Pri. School - Pb; Akura Reading Room; Dungu Pri. School - Pb; Ungwan Kwarra; K/Tsakuwa - Op; Abu - Op			
Lafia	Agyaragun Tofa	Bukar Tambari; Bukar Magayaki; Ung. Danjuma; Ung. Ubandoma; Ung. Alh. Yakubu I; Ung. Alh. Yakubu II; Ung. Alh. Yakubu - Op; Ung. Alh. Yahaya; Bukan Buzu; Bukan Burga; Bukan Allu - Op; Bukan Ashara; Tudun Wada; Kayarda Kofar Sarki; Ung. Alh. Saidu; Madagwa Watta; Sabon Kayarda; Kofar Sarki I; Kofar Sarki II; Mararaba Kayarda - Op; Tudun Okpu - Op; Kayarda (Viewing Centre); Tudun Aboshon - Op			
Lafia	Bakin Rijiya/Akurba/Sarkin Pada	Akurba Pri. School - Pb; Ung Magaji - Op; Akurba/Bakin Rijiya; K/Sarki B/Rijiya - Op; K/Mal/B/Rijiya - Op; Kas/Doya/B/Rijiya - Op; Alakyo - Op; Arugba - Op; Ung. Rere Asonya - Op; Bukan Sidi Pri. School - Pb I; Bukan Sidi Pri. School - Pb II; Kurikyo - Op; Govt. College Lafia - Pb; Akassa - Op; Igibi - Op; Ashakpa - Op; Bukan Sidi Primary School			
Lafia	Arikya	Arikya Pri. School - Pb I; Arikya Dispensary - Pb II; Arikya Dispensary - Pb III; Kungra Tofa - Op; Wuji - Op; Fadama Pri. School - Pb; Fadama K/Sarki - Op; Agbulagun Alh. Yakubu - Op; Kadaura Ung. Dogo - Op; Kampani - Op; Kungra Wayo - Op; Arugbadu Pri. School - Op; Arugbadu Ung. Sarki - Op; Agyabawa - Op; Feferuwa - Op; Shukku - Op; Gallo - Op; Mankwar - Op; Jibel - Op			
Lafia	Assakio	Reading Room - Pb I; Reading Room - Pb II; Kofar Madaki - Op; Kofar Sarki - Op; Sum Pri. School - Assakio Pb; Kofar Akika; Ashigogo Pri. School - Pb; Dispensary - Pb; Dispensary; Gidan Gambo - Op; Tunga Pri. School - Pb; Tunga Gidan Abashiya - Op; Gidan Akaave - Op; S/Gida/Kofar Sarki - Op; Sabon Gida Pri. School - Pb; Gidan Nyitse - Op; Gidan Chia - Op; Akuni Pri. School - Pb; Assakio Garage			
Lafia	Ashigie	Ashige Pri. School; Ashige Kofar Sarki; Ashangwa Pri. School - Pb; Ingila - Op; Alawagana Pri. School - Pb; Ashige; Gidan Buba K / Yahuza; Kiba Pri. School - Pb; Ung Koro Ashige - Op; Akunza Ashige; Ugah Pri. Scshool - Pb; Ugah K/Sarki - Op; Ugah West - Op; Ugah - Ung. Madaki - Op; Ung. Mission - Op; Tungan Daudu - Op; Tungan Daudu Pri. School - Pb; F/Bauna South K/Sarki - Op; F/Bauna South Pri. School; Gidan Adamu Agyo - Op; Gwayaka Pri. Sch. - Pb; Ung. Garba Gwayaka - Op; Alingani Pri. School - Pb; Kiguna Pri. School - Pb; Ung. Domark Kiguna - Op			
Lafia	Chiroma	Kofar Fada; Kofar Sanda - Op; Kofar Gabas - Op; Ung. Doka 4 - Op; Ung. Doka 5 - Op; Ung. Doka 6 - Op; Ung. Dillale - Op; Gindin Lemu; Wadata - Op; Kofar Alh. Yau - Op; Ung. Wajen Lalle - Op; Kofar Ngozi - Op; Kofar Ubandoma - Op; Kofar Shuayau - Op; Kofar Yakubu Ikedi - Op; Kofar Liman Jaba - Op; Kofar Baban Kaka; Kofar Idi Gwamnati; K / Sarki Organizer - Op; K / Maigari Maikifi - Op; Ung Tiv - Op; K/Danburam C - Op; K/Danburam D - Op; Tudun Kawari - Op; K/Sarkin Azara - Op; K/Isa Ugah - Op; Makabarta - Op; Plateau Lab - Op; Low Cost - Op; Project - Op; Maman Yaro - Op; Ung. Mangu - Op; Bukan Habu - Op; Kofar M/Zailani - Op; K/John Kyari - Op; Nasarawa Housing Estate - Op; Millionaire'S Quarters			
Lafia	Keffin/Wambai	Bad West - Op; Bad East - Op; Bad Police Station - Pb; Aridi Usman; Aridi Kuje - Op; Pri. School K/Wambai - Pb; K/Wambai Police Station - Pb; Ambana - Op; Awonge Makaranta; Awonge Aboshon - Op; Awonge Awunza - Op; Rumayo - Op; Takpa - Op; Koron Kuje - Op; Akuya S. U. M - Op; Rafin Kudi - Op			
Lafia	Makama	K/Kaura - Op; Ung. Galadima - Op; Birawa - Op; Kilema Pri. School - Pb; Bakin Gongoro - Op; Injin Shinkafa - Op; Tudun Mangoro - Op; Ung. Karofi - Op; Tudun Amba - Op; Worker'S Village			
Lafia	Shabu/Kwandere	Shabu Kofar Sarki - Op; Shabu Ta Gabas - Op; College Of Agric.; College Of Agric - Pb; Shabu Ang Arugba; Azuba - Op; Andasime - Op; Rafin Ganye - Op; Doka - Op; Danka Sarki - Op; Ung. Abubakar - Op; Kwandere Centre - Op; Kwandere Kofar Sarki; L. E. A Pri. School - Pb I; L. E. A Pri. School - Pb II; Kwandere Ung Yelwa - Op; Kwandere Ung Galadima - Op; Randa - Op; Aridi Ajige - Op; Aridi Hayin Dogo; Awuma T. V Centre - Pb; Pri. School Awuma - Pb; Awuma K/Sarki - Op			
Lafia	Wakwa	W/B/Kakani - Op; W/Alhaji - Op; Gimare - Op; Gimare - Kwashini - Op; Gandu Sarki - Op; Akunza Pri. School - Pb; Akunza Ubangari - Op; Kantsakuwa - Op; Agudu Pri. School - Pb; Akunza Jarme - Op; B/Kwato - Op I; B/Kwato - Op II			
Lafia	Zanwa	Ang. Zugu - Op; Nasarawa Zanwa - Op; K/Makama - Op; Kofan Baba Mala; Kaura Moyi - Op; K/Zanwa - Op; K/Mall/Ishaka - Op; K/S Makera - Op; K/Liman - Op			
Nasarawa Eggon	Nasarawa Eggon	Ung. Makama - Op; Ung. Yusuf Oga - Op; Ung. Galadima - Op; Ung. Jarmai - Op; Ung. Ahmadu Ajaga - Op; Ung. Danmadami - Op; Ung. Anyakon - Op; Ung. Lodo - Op; Ung. Moyi -Op; Ung. Yakubu Adda - Op; Government College - Pb; Kofar Zakari			
Nasarawa Eggon	Ubbe	Onge Oden Ogba - Op; Kuchuku - Op; Otsu Maku - Op; Ubbe Pri. School - Pb; Gaji Mission - Op			
Nasarawa Eggon	Igga/Burumburum	Ekan Church Angba - Op; Igga Aku - Op; Pri. School Burumburum - Pb; Igga Sarki - Op; Gbanze - Op; Ung Engom - Op; Ung. Sarki - Op; Ekan Church Burum Burum; Igga - Op			
Nasarawa Eggon	Umme	Bakin Kogi - Op; Ebbe Gama - Op; Lcc Bakyano - Op; Kofar Fada Arugbadu - Op; Ung. Arugbadu - Op; Bakyano Adamu Lewa - Op; Bakyano Kassa; Ung. Galadima - Op; Lekyati - Op; Ung. Katiri - Op; Erre Zomo - Op; Akpu Magaji - Op; Ung. Galadima Arugbadu - Op			
Nasarawa Eggon	Mada Station	Angbashuru - Op; Angbashun Oden - Op; Ung. Ibo - Op; Ung. Garba Sule - Op; Ung. Mission - Op; Ung. Railway - Op; Ung. Dangana - Op; Ladi Ende - Op; Ung. Elle - Op; Ung. Alade - Op			
Nasarawa Eggon	Lizzin Keffi/Ezzen	Ung. Sarki Lizzin Keffi - Op; Eshiagbi - Op; Ongezi Lizzin Keffi - Op; Lizzin Keffi Tudu Op; Assan Pri. School - Pb; Anjia Kolo; Lamis Ezzen - Op; Ezzen Kwari Eha - Op; Ezzen Kwari			
Nasarawa Eggon	Lambaga/Arikpa	Lamaga Village - Op; Lamaga Tudu - Op; L. G. E. A Arikpa - Pb; Ung. Abimiku Kudi - Op; Randa Arikpa - Op			
Nasarawa Eggon	Kagbu Wana	Sarki Wana - Op; L. S. B Buri - Pb; Ung. Akwashiki - Op; Sarki Ekpon - Op; Ekpon - Op; Lgea Wolon - Pb; Wata - Op; Ekpon Tudu - Op; Ung. Abimiku Anjugu - Op; Neko Tudu - Op			
Nasarawa Eggon	Ikka Wangibi	Ekan Church Washo - Op; Langalanga - Op; Ikkah Dispensary - Pb; Eva Wangibi - Op; Ung. Kigbu Kuje - Op; Wulga - Op; Akun Umbugutso - Op; Ung. Matu - Op; Awuza - Op			
Nasarawa Eggon	Ende	Zaure Adigizi - Op; Wulko Fada Hakimi - Op; Wowen - 0p; Aboshon Bisa - Op; Aku Yango - Op			
Nasarawa Eggon	Wakama	Wakama Lashe - Op; Wakama Tudu - Op; Awayi - Op; G. T. C. Ola - Pb; Wakama Central - Op; Wakama Clinic - Pb; Awogenshen - Op; Ung. Tsaku Atsoko - Op; Azikili - Op			
Nasarawa Eggon	Aloce/Ginda	Sati Ginda Waji - Op; Ginda Gida - Op; S. U. M Alushi - Pb; Alushi Dispensary - Pb; Alushi Erro - Op; Angbaku - Op			
Nasarawa Eggon	Alogani	Gako - Op; Alogani Tudu - Op; Wogan - Op; Gidan Waya - Op; Alogani South - Op; Ehala Yaka - Op; Ehala Yaka - I Pri. School - Pb; Zaure Allu Amma - Op; Alogani North - Op; Galle Tudu - Op; Onhwonako - Op; Alogani Central			
Nasarawa Eggon	Agunji	Agunji - Op; Agunji - Tudu - Op; Ogbagi Pri. School - Pb; Ogbagi Tudu - Op; Angbako - Op; Agunji Alaga			
Toto	Gwargwada	Gwargwada; Gwambe I; Gwambe II; Majaga; Rubochi; Gwargwada II			
Toto	Gadagwa	Dikko; Araba; Pesin; Warakata; Huni; Gadabuke (A); Kpembo; Gad. Pri. School; Gad. Gbagyi; Gadabuke (B)			
Toto	Bugakarmo	Madeki; Tudu Uku (A); Tudu Uku (B); Kunke; Loko Goma; Karmo Romudu(A); Karmo Kwaki; Nakuse; Dajie; Karmo Gangi; Karmo Romodu (B)			
Toto	Umaisha	Ubo Kpokiti; Dimbeku Gusu; Shice; Kudiri; Ang. Galadima (A); Ang. Galadima (B); Kakana; Ogaza A; Yelwa; Osoko A; Yelwa Basa; Zainaku; Sogene; Osoko Uac; Ang. Galadima C; Kpadabu; Osoko B; Gaura Odulla; Ogaza B			
Toto	Dausu	Uttu; Ahulla; Gbemida; Dausu; Yimowa; Udua; Igwa - Pati; Gberi; Kamgbo			
Toto	Kanyehu	Kanyehu; Karbana; Fofuru; Zwore			
Toto	Ugya	Ugya Madaki (A); Ugya Madaki (B); Rudu; Bakete; Dubeku; Kovofu; Luma Luma; Dare; Panda Ahulla; Kolo; Ayiwawa			
Toto	Toto	Ahere Kwatto; Ohizi; Aganki Sarki (A); Hausawa Liman 'A'; Rafin Kunama; Hausawa Kambari; Gbawodi; Kpegu; Ukya Zakutu; Ukya Yewuye; Achido; Kofa (A); Kofa (B); Hausawa Liman (B); Adadu; Dimbeku; Aganki Sarki			
Toto	Shafan Abakpa I	Kuru; Yelwa; Chereku; Tawana Kuru; Shafan Abakpa; Dare; Rakpami; Nugba; Shafa Abakpa Primary School; Gbari; Market Square; Dajie			
Toto	Shafan Kwatto I	Ang. Sarki; Nyeji; Gate; Sardauna; Munya; Sheshe Genshe; Ang. Liman			
Toto	Shege I	Iggi; Ogbere; Kaita; Kokoto; Shege; Shakaruku; Kakulo; Tondo; Ihamkpe (A); Ihamkpe (B); Angura			
Toto	Katakpa I	Katakpa; Sere; Risagu; Shizhe; Emue			
Wamba	Arum	Arum Tumara Pri. School; Arum Tumara; Arum Kado - Pri. School, Kado; Arum Chugbu - Primary School, Arum Chugbu; Arum Sarki - Pri. School, Arum Sarki			
Wamba	Mangar	Chessu - Pri. School, Chessu; Turkwan Kanja - Open Square Turkwan Kanja; Turkwan Mission - Open Square Turkwan Kanja; Yashi - Pri. School, Yashi; Mangar Pri. School, Mangar I; Mangar Pri. School, Mangar II; Massenge - Pri. School, Mangar			
Wamba	Gitta	Sisinbaki - Pri. School, Sisinbaki; Sisinbaki - Market Square Sisinbarki; Kuraga - Pri. School, Kuraga; Gongon Junction - Pri. School, Gongon Junction; Ung. Rimi Pry School			
Wamba	Nakere	Gbude - Open Square, Gbude; Nakere - Pri. School; Nakere - Open Square Nakere; Ragga - Pri. School, Ragga; Ragga			
Wamba	Konvah	Konvah - Konvah Pri. School; Ugure - Pri. School Ugure; Lago - Lago I; Lago-Lago II			
Wamba	Wayo	Wayo - Pri. School; Langi - Open Space Langi; Wayo - Pri. School Wayo; Spine- Pri. School Wayo; Ugye -Primary Ugye; Kurize - Open Space, Kurize			
Wamba	Wamba West	Cms Pri. School (A); Cms Primary School (B); Old Central Office- Old Central Office; Ungwan Zanuwa - Open Space - Ung. Zanuwa; Bye-Pass - Open Space, Bye-Pass; Gwagi - Open Space, Gwagi; Wamba Kurmi - Pri. School, Wamba Kurmi; Ungo - Open Space, Ungo			
Wamba	Wamba East	Ung. Sabo - Open Square; Gbombu - Open Space; Kofar Fada I; Kofar Fada II; New Bank - Behind U. B. A; New Bank; G. S. S Wamba; Waja			
Wamba	Jimiya	Ambaka - Pri. School; Jimiya - Pri. School; Zalli - Pri. School; Kam/Kire - Pri. School, Kam			
