= Abuja Light Rail =

Commuter rail system in Abuja, Nigeria

Abuja Rail Mass Transit
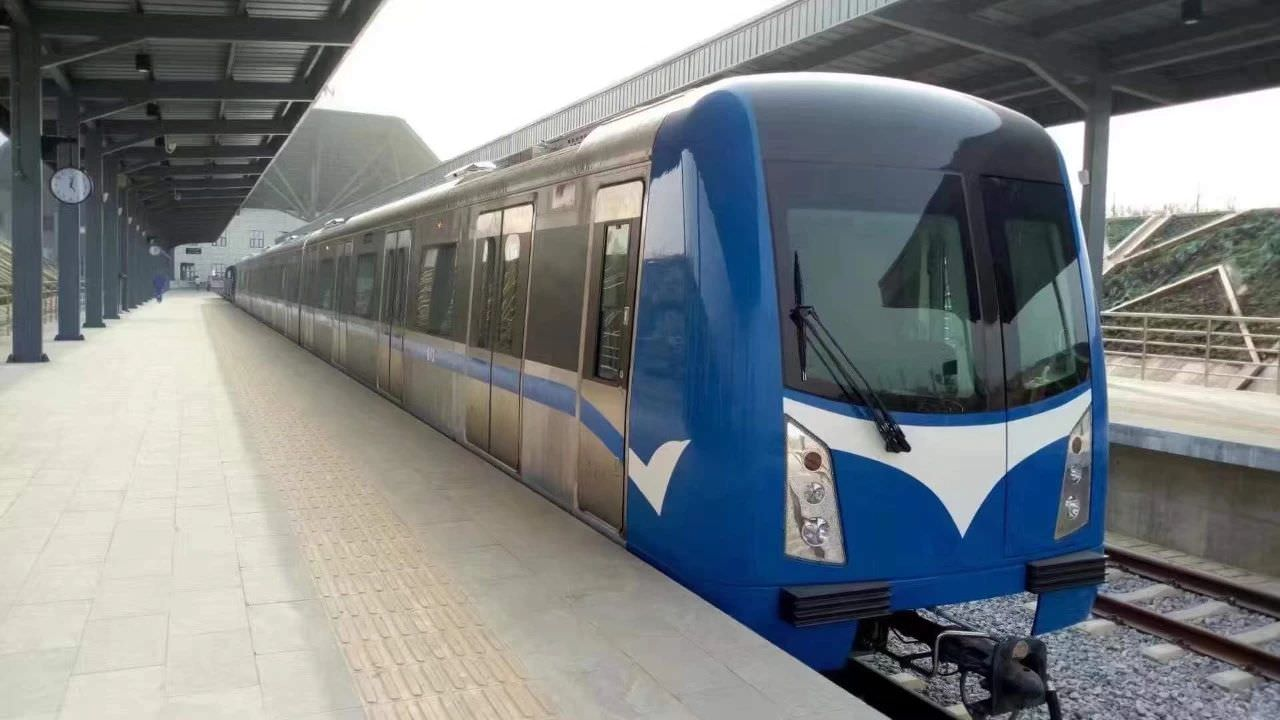

Overview
- Locale: Federal Capital Territory
- Transit type: Regional rail
- Number of lines: 2
- Line number: Yellow line, Blue Line
- Number of stations: 12

Operation
- Began operation: 12 July 2018; 8 years ago

Technical
- System length: 42.5 km (26.4 mi)
- Track gauge: 1,435 mm (4 ft 8 1/2 in) standard gauge
System map

Abuja Rail Mass Transit (commonly known as Abuja Light Rail) is a regional rail transport system in the Federal Capital Territory of Nigeria. It was the first rapid transit system in Nigeria and the second such system in sub-saharan Africa (after Addis Ababa Light Rail). The first phase of the project connects the city center to Nnamdi Azikiwe International Airport, stopping at the Abuja-Kaduna Railway station in Idu. The Abuja Metro Line was launched on 12 July 2018 and a three-trains-per-day service opened for passengers the following week. Passenger services on the line were suspended in early 2020 due to the COVID-19 pandemic and resumed on 29 May 2024, with four trips per day on both lines, and all the stations on both lines fully operational.

== History ==
A regional rail system serving Abuja had begun planning in 1997 but was delayed due to funding issues. CCECC Nigeria was awarded a contract for the construction of the first two phases, known as Lots 1 and 3, in May 2007.

The 42.5 km (26.4 mi) first phase has two lines and 12 stations opened in July 2018, connecting Abuja city centre with the international airport via the Lagos–Kano Standard Gauge Railway at Idu. The projected cost of the entire proposed 290 km (180 mi) network, to be developed in six phases, was US$824 million, constructed by China Civil Engineering Construction Corporation (CCECC), with 60% of the cost funded by loans from the Exim Bank of China. In fact, $840 million was spent on Lot 1 and 3, while $500 million was financed by a 2.5% p.a. loan from the Exim Bank of China. Repayment of the loan commenced in March 2020.

In early 2020, passenger service on the line was suspended due to the COVID-19 pandemic, and as of 2022 had not resumed.

The service has restarted in May 2024. While inspecting the project in January 2024, FCT Minister, Nyesom Wike, expressed concerns regarding the 'design quality' of the project:

From what I have seen, the designs are very poor. Whoever may have approved the designs is unfair to Nigerians.

I’ve told CCECC that this kind of design is not even acceptable in their own country and if I had known before now, I would not have promised Mr. President that it would be ready.

The conceptualisation is not the best, but again what do you do? This is what is on the ground. We have to see how we can finish it on time.

In April 2024, Wike announced that the project was 97% complete, and was set to be re-launched in May. The minister later added that passengers of the metro will not be charged during its first two months of operation. During the official re-launch of the project, the President of Nigeria, Bola Tinubu, extended the period for free travel until the end of 2024.

== Operations ==
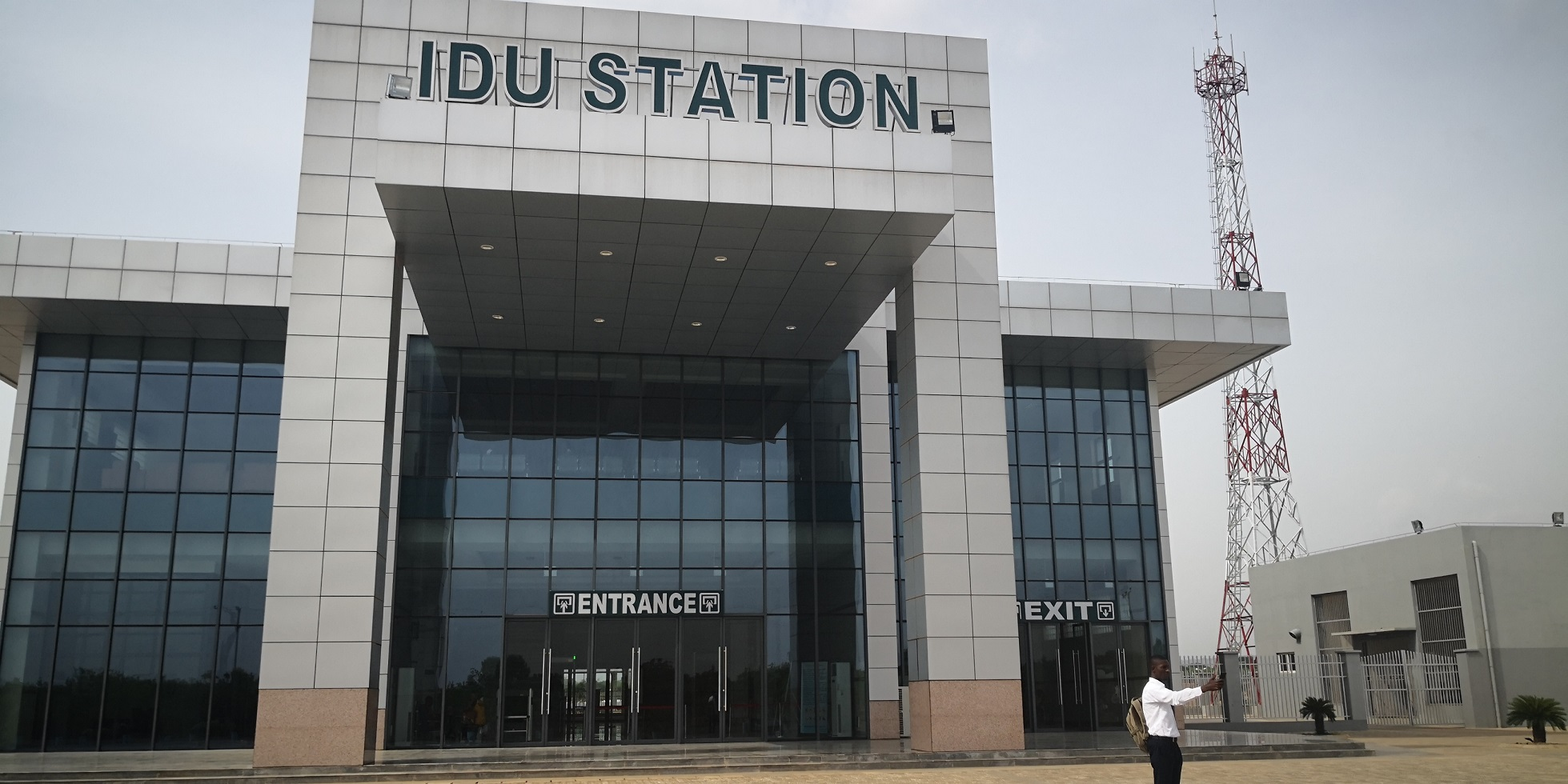
Idu Station Terminal outside

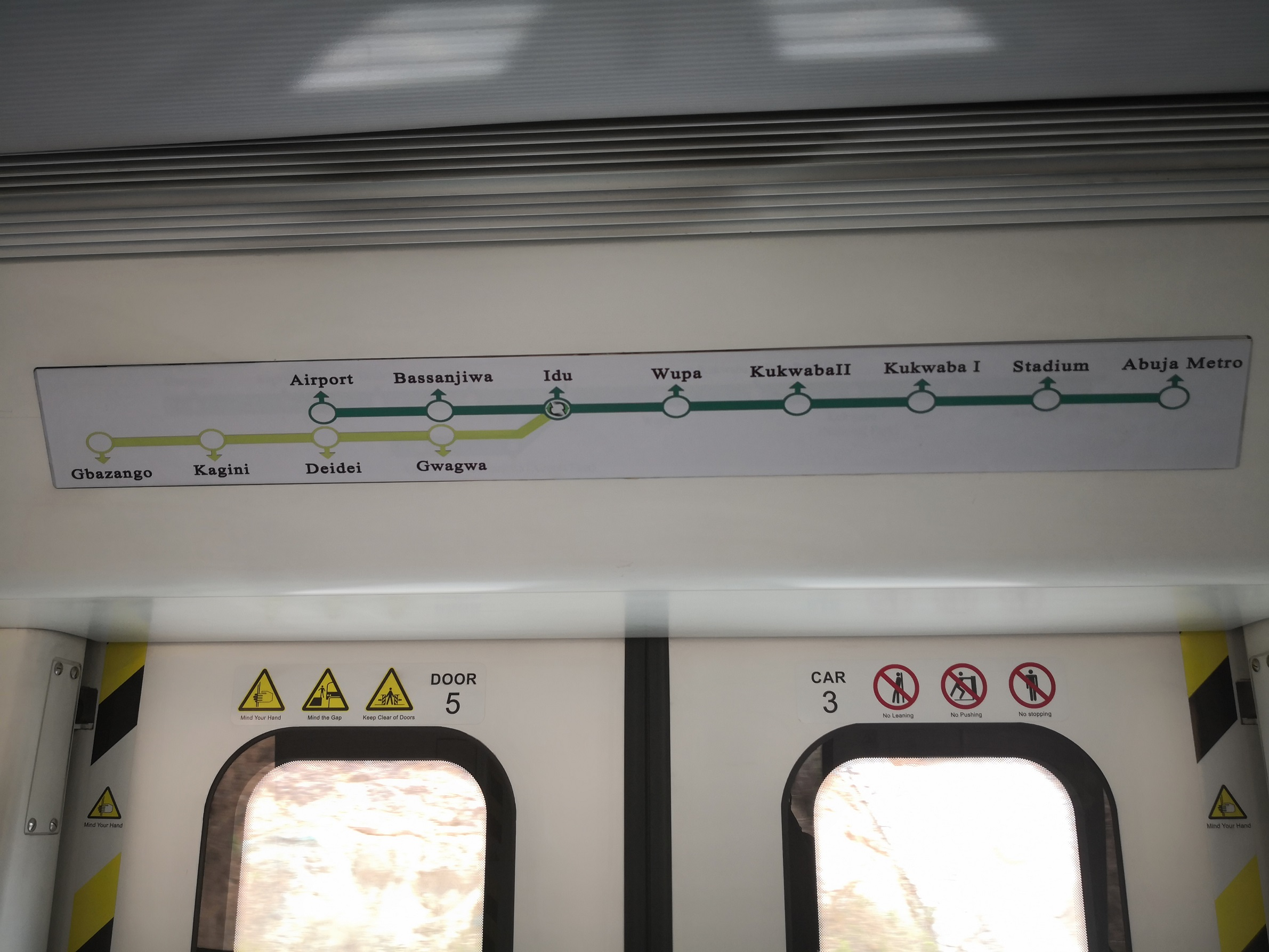
Idu Station route

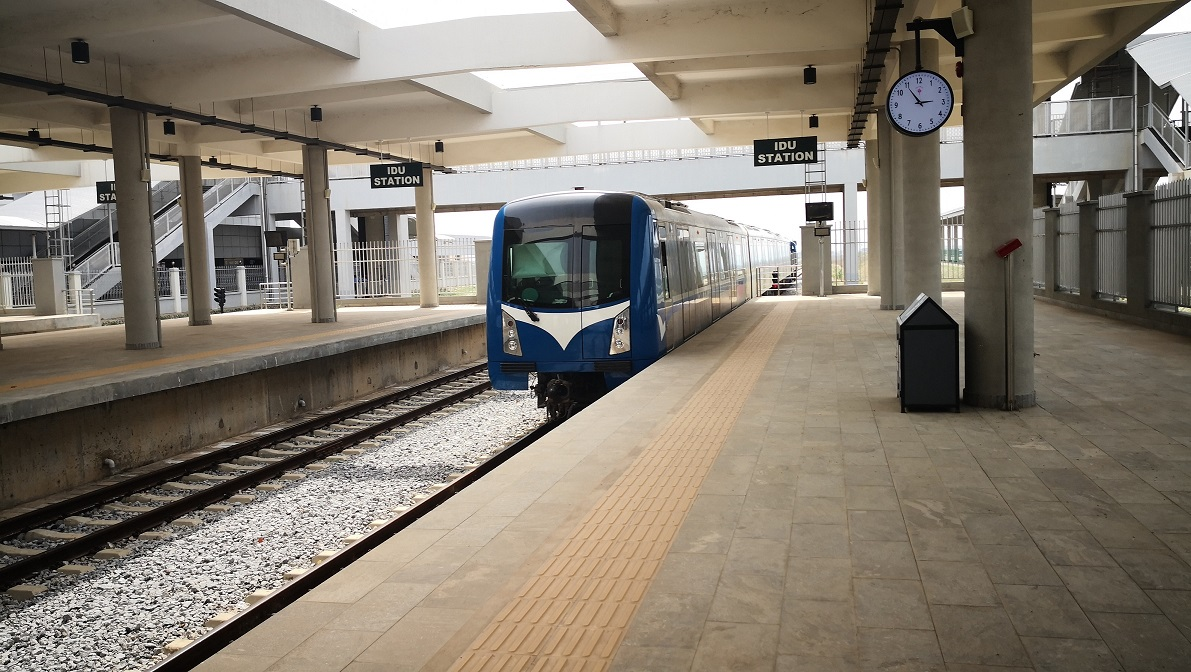
Idu Station platform

Upon opening in 2018, only the section between Abuja Metro Station and the Airport was operational, with an intermediate station at Idu. The remaining nine stations were originally scheduled to begin operations in 2020.

The rolling stock used for this line initially consisted of only three diesel rail coaches. A further three were scheduled to be delivered in mid-2020.

From the opening, the rail line operated on a significantly reduced timetable in comparison to other worldwide light rail systems; with three daily departures from Idu to Abuja Metro Station, with two running the full length to the airport, on weekdays only. The delivery of further rolling stock was anticipated to provide services every thirty minutes.

== Network ==
The first part of the network was commissioned on 12 July 2018, and three stations opened in this first phase.

=== Yellow line ===
The Yellow line travels from Abuja's Central Business District to Nnamdi Azikiwe International Airport.

Stations	Location
Abuja Metro	9.0505°N 7.4719°E
Stadium	9.0459°N 7.4517°E
Kukwaba I	9.0402°N 7.4410°E
Kukwaba II	9.0306°N 7.4226°E
Wupa	9.0247°N 7.3950°E
Idu	9.0466°N 7.3421°E
Bassanjiwa	9.0136°N 7.2824°E
Airport	9.0062°N 7.2720°E

=== Blue Line ===
The Blue Line will travel from Idu to Kubwa.

Stations	Location
Idu	9.0466°N 7.3421°E
Gwagwa	9.0901°N 7.2852°E
Deidei	9.1061°N 7.2872°E
Kagini	9.1245°N 7.2922°E
Gbazango	9.1536°N 7.3110°E

== Future expansion ==
A network totalling 290 km (180 mi) is proposed, divided into six phases or 'lots'. Lots 1 and 3 have finished construction.

- Lot 2 is from Gwagwa via Transportation Centre (Metro Station) to Nyanya/Karu
- Lot 4 is from Kuje to Karshi with the remaining legs of the Transitway Line 2
- Lot 5 from Kubwa via Bwari to Suleja
- Lot 6 from Airport via Kuje and Gwagwalada to Dobi.

== See also ==
- Lagos Rail Mass Transit
- Transport in Nigeria
- Rail transport in Nigeria
