= Karu Urban Area =

Urban area in central Nigeria

Greater Karu Urban Area Urban Karu
- Urban area
- Interactive map of Greater Karu Urban Area
- Country: Nigeria
- State: Nasarawa
- Principal towns: New Nyanya; Mararaba; New Karu; Ado; Masaka

Government
  - Body: Karu Local Government

Area
  - Urban: 400 km^{2} (150 sq mi)

Population
  - Urban: 2,000,000
  - Urban density: 500/km^{2} (1,300/sq mi)
- Time zone: UTC+1 (WAT)
  - Summer (DST): UTC+1 (not observed)
- Website: []

The Karu Urban Area is an urban area in central Nigeria. The urban area is majorly located in the Nigerian state of Nasarawa, but with some parts stretching into the boundaries of the Federal Capital Territory (FCT). It has an area of 40,000 hectares (400 km^{2}) and a population of some 2 million.

It is one of the fastest growing urban areas in the world, with a growth rate of 40 percent recorded annually. It consists of towns that developed as a result of urban sprawl from Abuja.

From west to east, the urban area includes towns like Kurunduma, New Nyanya, Mararaba, New Karu, Ado, Masaka and newer, fast-growing towns such as One Man Village (which contains over 1 million people), New Karshi and Gidan Zakara. Since the beginning of the 20th century, these districts have grown together into a large urban area and a major commercial centre of central Nigeria.

== History ==
In the 1970s, it was decided to relocate Nigeria's capital from Lagos to the centre of the country. The site chosen for the new capital was very close to the villages that made up the present Karu Area, which was a sparsely populated area typical of Nigeria's Middle Belt.

In the 1980s, the Nigerian government began transferring its activities to Abuja, and countries began relocating their embassies there. The Economic Community of West African States moved its headquarters to Abuja, and OPEC moved its regional headquarters there. The result was a rapid increase in Abuja's population, which more than doubled in a short time. The Karu area was also affected, as its villages experienced rapid growth due to their close proximity to the new capital.

== Growth and urbanisation ==
In 2003, Mallam Nasir Ahmad el-Rufai, then minister of the Federal Capital Territory of Nigeria, wished to regain control of the population explosion of Abuja, which had led to the deterioration of the city's infrastructure. He started a campaign of demolition, using bulldozers to demolish structures and clear shanty towns. The campaign made hundreds of thousands of residents homeless, as the remaining decent accommodation was highly priced, and lands approved for residential areas were too expensive for those on an average income, because of Abuja's status as the capital of Africa's oil giant, Nigeria, a country where most people live on less than US$2 a day. These people were thus driven to find affordable accommodation in the neighbouring satellite towns. Because it is so close to Abuja, many of them went to the Karu area, which underwent a population explosion that quickly transformed it into an urban area.

=== Urban developments of Karu ===
The rapid growth of the Karu Urban Area began attracting businesses such as banks, hospitality providers and engineering firms, making it more popular than ever and further accelerating its population growth. People from other parts of the country, reluctant to live in the expensive Abuja, came to settle in Karu, which was regarded as a new urban area that grew as a result of Abuja's influence. The towns in the area soon began to merge into a conurbation more than 24 kilometres long, with a population projected to be around 2 million.

== Government and administration ==
The Greater Karu Urban Area is governed by the Karu Local Government in Nasarawa state in Nigeria's middle belt. The Karu Local Government is headed by a chairman elected for a four-year term. It has its headquarters and secretariat in New Karu town. The local government council is responsible for the development of infrastructure in the Karu Urban Area, with the backing of the state government of Nasarawa State. The Esu Karu, the traditional ruler of New Karu, is recognised as a traditional authority in the local government area. He is responsible for settling conflicts among members of the indigenous ethnic groups and serves as the record keeper of the area's history.

== Weather and climate ==
The Greater Karu Urban Area has the tropical savanna climate of central Nigeria, with alternating rainy and dry seasons. The rainy season begins in April and ends in November. Rainfall in the Urban Area is high owing to its location on the windward side of the Jos Plateau and the zone of rising air masses. The annual total rainfall is in the range 1100 –1600 mm.

== Health ==
The Greater Karu Urban Area serves as a health centre for central Nigeria, with many hospitals, medical centres, and clinics.

== Economy ==
The Greater Karu Urban Area has a well-developed banking sector, and many construction firms carrying out a large number of construction projects. It is also emerging as an industrial base. The growing economy and the commercialisation of the Karu Urban Area has given the city a middle-income status.

== Transportation ==
The Karu Urban Area is connected to Abuja by an expressway, which is owned by Nigeria's federal government.

== Education ==
The agglomeration in the Karu area has attracted private investments in education to provide for the growing young and illiterate adult population. The area has a number of primary schools, secondary schools and universities.
