= April 2014 Nyanya bombing =

2014 bombing of a bus station in Nyanya, Nigeria by Boko Haram

Coordinates: 9.0500°N 7.5000°E

April 2014 Nyanya attacks
- Part of the Boko Haram insurgency
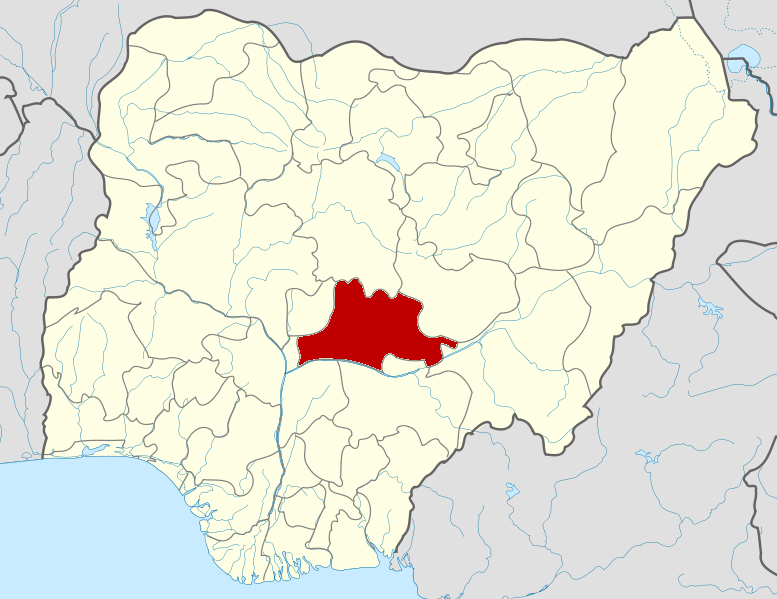
- Location: Nyanya, Nasarawa, Nigeria
- Date: 14 April 2014 (GMT+1)
- Target: Crowds at the Nyanya Motor Park bus station in Nasarawa, near the Federal Capital Territory
- Attack type: Twin bombing
- Deaths: 88+
- Injuries: 200+
- Perpetrator: Boko Haram

On 14 April 2014 at about 6:45 am, two bombs exploded at a crowded bus station in Nyanya, Abuja, Nigeria, killing at least 88 people and injuring at least 200. The bus station is 8 km southwest of central Federal Capital Territory.

Boko Haram claimed responsibility for the bombing six days later. It occurred just hours before the Chibok schoolgirls kidnapping.

== Attack ==
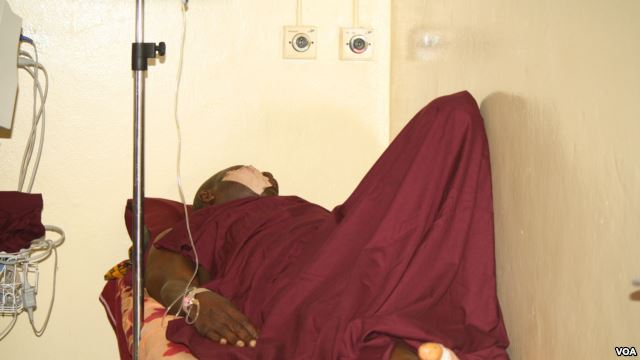
A man rests in the hospital after 71 people were killed and 124 injured when a bomb exploded at a bus station just outside Abuja, April 15, 2014.

Explosives hidden inside vehicles detonated during morning rush hour in a bus station in Nyanya on the outskirts of Abuja. After the initial blast, further explosions occurred as fuel tanks in nearby vehicles ignited.

Abbas Idris, head of the Abuja Emergency Relief Agency, confirmed that 71 people had been killed and 124 injured. The bus station serves a poor, ethnically and religiously mixed community. Manzo Ezekiel, spokesman of the National Emergency Management Agency, confirmed that numerous injured victims were undergoing treatment in the hospital. By April 15, the death toll had increased to 75, as investigators continued to sift through the wreckage at the blast site. By April 18, the death toll had increased to 88, with more than 200 reported injured.

== Responsibility ==
Boko Haram claimed responsibility for the bombing six days after it occurred—the video claiming responsibility features the group's leader Abubakar Shekau and was released on 19 April. Aminu Sadiq Ogwuche was arrested by Interpol in Sudan in May 2014 on the suspicion of being one of the masterminds behind the bombings. Hours after the attack, Boko Haram kidnapped hundreds of schoolgirls in Chibok.

== Response ==
Nigerian President Goodluck Jonathan visited the scene of the blast, where he said:

We have lost quite a number. We condole with our country men and women. The issue of Boko Haram is quite an ugly history within this period of our own development. Government is doing everything to make sure that we move our country forward. But these are the unnecessary distractions that are pushing us backward. But we will get over it.

The attack came the day after Nigerian senator Ahmed Zanna claimed the Islamist group had killed 135 civilians in northeast Nigeria in three attacks during the week preceding the blast.

== See also ==
- May 2014 Nyanya bombing
