= Ado, Nasarawa State =

Ado
- Town
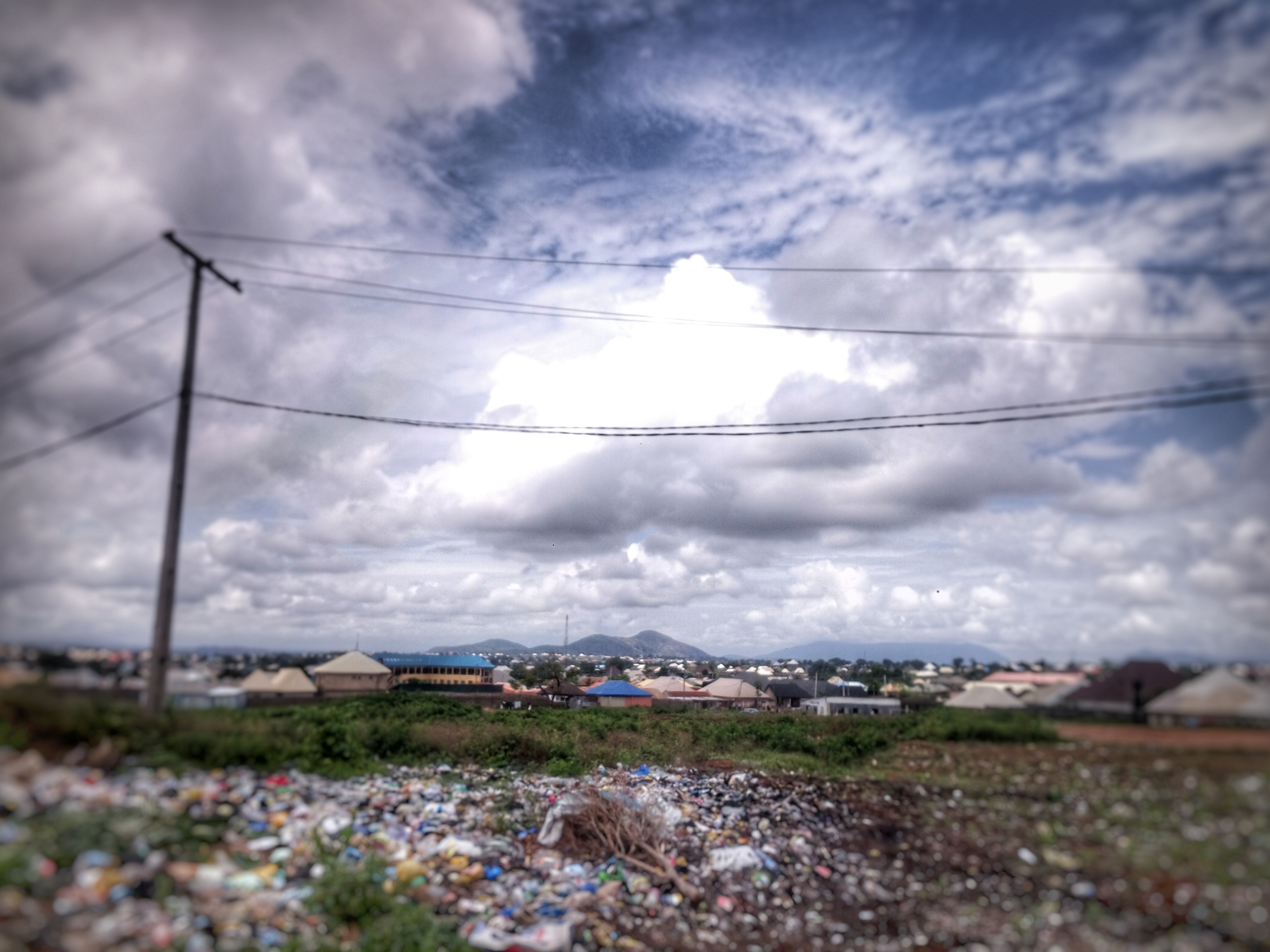

- Location within Nigeria
- Coordinates: 9°0′N 7°37′E
- Country: Nigeria
- State: Nasarawa
- LGA: Karu
- Elevation: 455 m (1,493 ft)
- Time zone: UTC+1 (WAT)

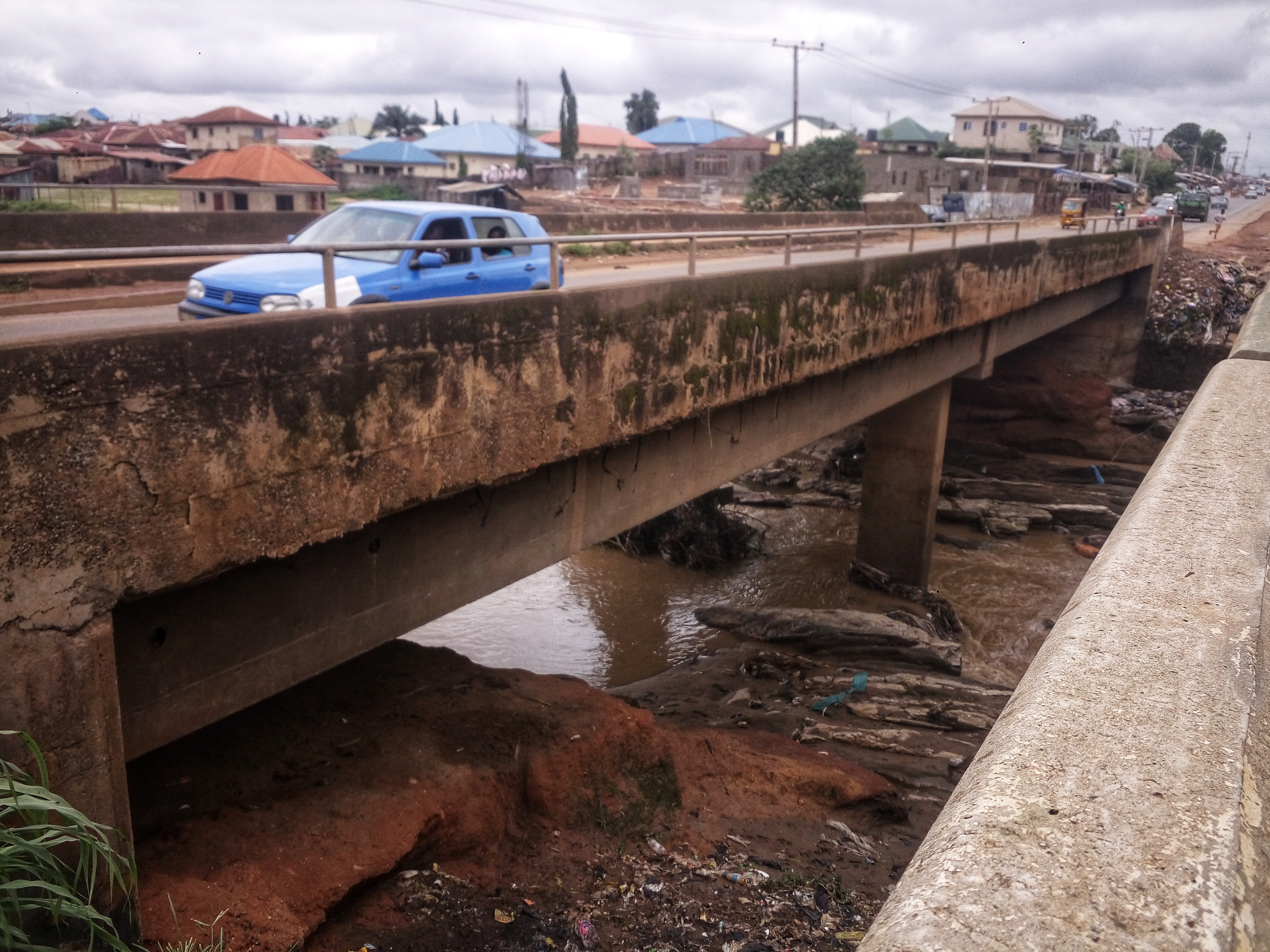
Bridge in Ado

Ado is a town in Nasarawa, central Nigeria. It is a district of Karu Local Government Area, Nasarawa State and is among the towns that make up the Karu urban area, a conurbation of towns stretching to Nigeria's Federal Capital Territory.

Its neighbouring towns are:

- Mararaba,
- Ado,
- New Nyanya,
- Masaka
- New Karu and Kurunduma and neighbouring villages.

This urban area developed following the expansion of administrative and economic activities of Abuja, the capital of Nigeria into the urban areas surrounding. The evacuation of tens of thousands of people from Abuja by the Federal Capital Territory (Nigeria) (F C T) administration, also led to an increase in population of this urban area.

The natives of Ado are the Gbagyi people.
