= Ishaq Ahmed Kana =

Nigerian politician

Ishaq Ahmed Kana is a Nigerian politician who represented the Karu/Keffi/Konona Federal Constituency in Nasarawa State in the National House of Representatives from 2011 to 2015.
