= Masaka, Nasarawa State =

Masaka
- Town
- Location within Nigeria
- Coordinates: 9°0′N 7°40′E
- Country: Nigeria
- State: Nasarawa State
- LGA: Karu
- Elevation: 448 m (1,470 ft)
- Time zone: UTC+1 (WAT)
- Postal code: 961105

Masaka is a town in Nasarawa State, central Nigeria. It is a district of Karu Local Government Area and is among the towns that forms the Karu urban area, a conurbation of towns under Karu Local Government Area of Nasarawa State. The neighbouring towns to Masaka, also in this urban area as a result of their merger following a population explosion in the zone, are:

- Mararaba,
- Ado,
- New Nyanya,
- Masaka,
- New Karu and Kurunduma

This urban area developed following the expansion of administrative and economic activities of Abuja, the capital of Nigeria, into the urban areas surrounding it. The evacuation of tens of thousands of people from Abuja by the Federal Capital Territory (Nigeria) (F C T) administration also led to an increase in population of this urban area.

== Transportation ==
Masaka is served by a modern expressway, built to link Keffi to Abuja.
