= May 2014 Nigeria bombings =

May 2014 Nigeria bombings may refer to:

- 2014 Jos bombings
- May 2014 Nyanya bombing
