= Ara Rock =

Mountain in Nigeria

- Location within Nigeria

Highest point
- Elevation: 120 m (390 ft)
- Coordinates: 8°35′N 7°35′E

Geography
- Location: Nigeria

Ara Rock is a rock found in Ara Town in Nasarawa Local Government Area of Nasarawa State in central Nigeria. It achieves a remarkable height of about 120 metres (390 ft) above the surface of the neighbouring plains and it attracts many people to Ara town on sightseeing visits.

== Location ==
The rock stands close to the Federal Capital Territory of Nigeria (FCT), about 12 km (7 mi) away from Nasarawa town and about 220 km (137 mi) away from the town of Lafia, the Nasarawa State state capital.

== Cultural significance ==
Annual festivals and cultural displays are held on the rock by the settlers of the town who worship annually on the rock.
