= Idu, Abuja =

Neighbourhood in Abuja

Idu is an industrial neighbourhood in the Nigerian capital city of Abuja.

== Transport ==
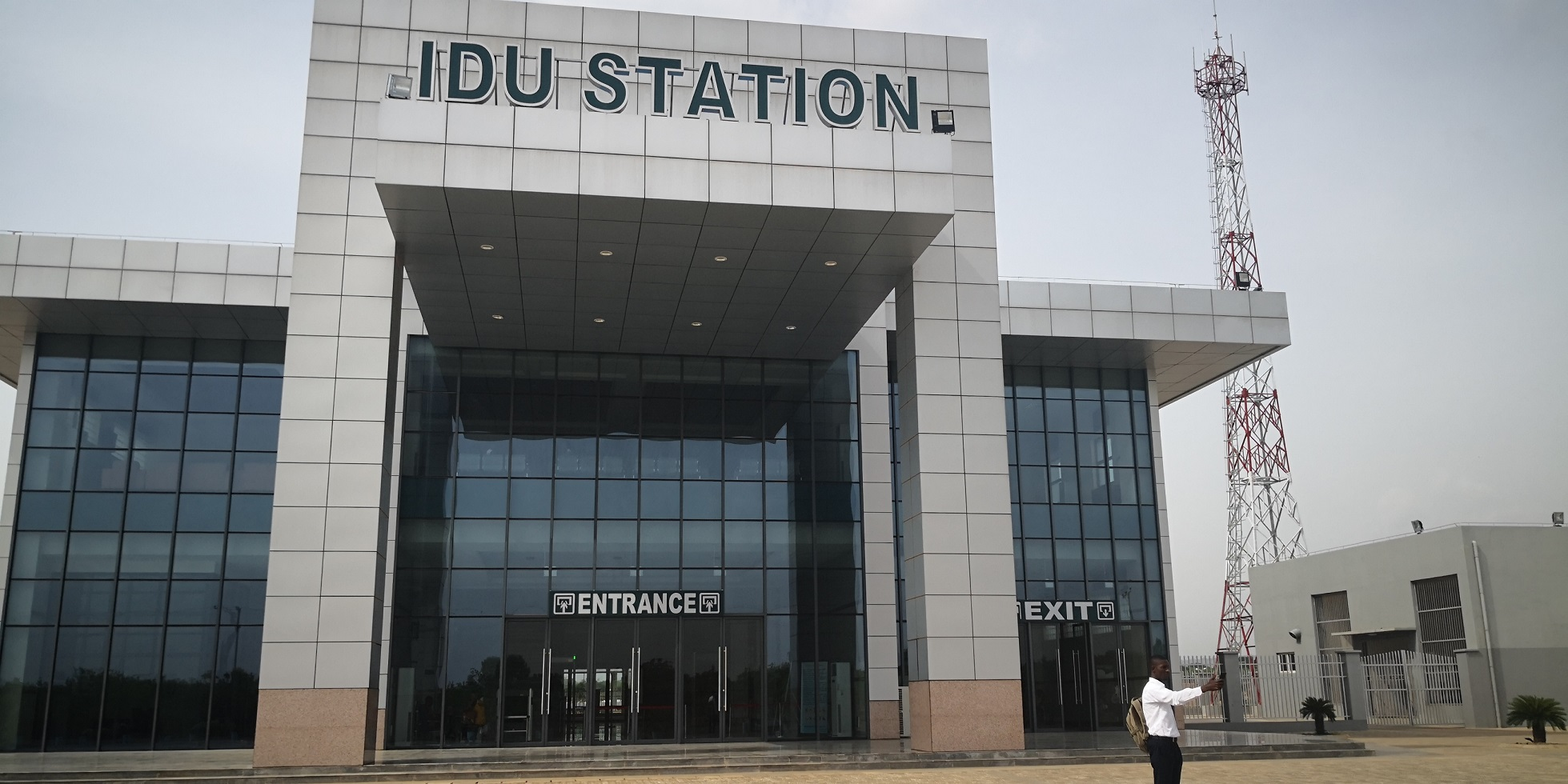
Photo Showing the Exterior of Idu Railway Station Terminal

Idu will be the interchange station between the standard gauge railway and the Abuja light rail system.
