= One Man Village =

Village in Central Nigeria

One Man Village is a village in central Nigeria. It is found in Karu Local Government area of Nasarawa State. It lies close to Abuja, Federal Capital Territory, Nigeria.
