= Nyanya (Abuja) =

Satellite town in Abuja, Nigeria

Nyanya is a satellite town in the Federal Capital Territory, Abuja. It is located to the southwest of the city of Abuja and it is 4 kilometers from Asokoro and 6 kilometers from Three Arms Zone. Nyanya is one of the most populated satellite towns in the FCT. It is a border town between FCT and Nasarawa State and serves as a major route linking FCT to the north central and north east regions of Nigeria.

== Structure ==
Nyanya is divided into five zones - Zone A – Zone E. A large number of middle and lower class federal civil servants, private organisations employees, traders and artisans reside in Nyanya. It has a public lowcost housing estate. Its major health facility is the Nyanya General Hospital and has a weekly market known by same name which holds Wednesdays. The market holds several public and private bus terminals. The major means of transportation within the town is motor cycle (Okada) and tricycle (Keke). It has a Divisional Police Headquarters, Squadron 21 Mobile Police Unit and a High Court of Justice.

== 2014 bombing ==
On 14 April 2014 at about 6:45 am rush hour, two bombs detonated at the crowded Nyanya bus station killing at least 88 people and injuring at least 200. Boko Haram claimed responsibility for the bombing. Nigeria president Goodluck Jonathan visited the scene of the bombing and victims receiving treatment in hospitals hours after the bombing.
