= May 2014 Nyanya bombing =

Terrorist incident in Nigeria

Coordinates: 9.0500°N 7.5000°E

- Part of the Boko Haram insurgency
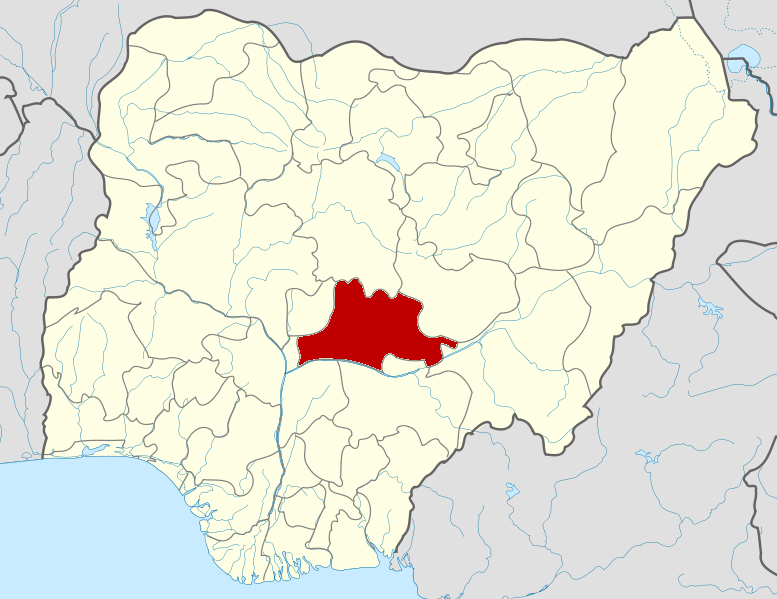
- Location: Nyanya, Nasarawa, Nigeria
- Date: 1 May 2014; 8:03 PM (GMT+1)
- Target: Police checkpoint
- Attack type: Car bomb
- Deaths: 19
- Injuries: 60
- Perpetrator: Unknown

On 1 May 2014, a car bomb exploded in New Nyanya, a town in Nasarawa State, Nigeria. The explosion killed at least 19 people and injured at least 60.

== Background ==
More than 15,000 people have been killed in Nigeria over the last 15 years in this conflict. Most attacks involve religious motivation; typically stemming from demands for Islamic Sharia law to replace supreme secular law of the Federal Republic of Nigeria. The group Boko Haram has been attributed to being behind the attacks. Since that group has little internal organization and is fragmented into factions these actions are generally not attributed to any specific group or leader.

== Attack ==
A car with explosives inside of it drove up to a police checkpoint. Once the car arrived at the checkpoint, a man got out of the car and began running away as the car blew up. This caused smaller explosions to occur as other cars caught on fire and exploded. According to Frank Mba, the police superintendent, a total of six cars were blown up as a result of the car bomb. The attack happened near the area where a large bombing happened the month before.
