= Karshi, Abuja =

Nigerian Township

Karshi is a town in Nigeria. It is located in the Federal Capital Territory, a satellite town situated in Abuja Municipal Area Council. Its geographical coordinates are 8° 49' 40" North, 7° 33' 0" East and its original name (with diacritics) is Karshi. Karshi is about 38 km to Federal capital city of Abuja and 41 km from Karshi to Apo.

The predominant tribe in this town are the Gwandara who constitute about 85% of the total population. In the 1980s with the creation of Abuja as the Federal Capital Territory some Gwandaras left to create what is known today as New Karshi in Nasarawa State with a first class Emir, Muhammadu Bako III (PhD). Other monitory tribes in Karshi are Gade, Gbagyi, Hausa, Fulani, Yoruba, Igbo, Idoma and Tiv. The predominant occupations of the major inhabitants are farming, hunting and blacksmithing. Islam is the major religion of the people in Karshi central area while few minority tribes dispersed around the area practice Christianity.

== History ==
Karshi town is believed to be one of the oldest settlements in the middle belt zone. It was founded by Mallam Danbaba. When Islam was first introduced in Kano in the middle of the 14th century, the ruling family to which Danbaba belonged took exception to the new religion known as Karshi today. This uncompromising stand of Danbaba on the new religion led to a series of misunderstandings which culminated in his disinheritance from the throne. Subsequently, Danbaba and his followers migrated from the present Dala Kano to safeguard their faith and gods. As a result, they were nicknamed “GWANDARAWA DA SALLAH”. This means “preference to dance rather than conversion to Islam”. With time, the name shortened to “GWANDARA”

When Danbaba and his followers left Kano, they wandered about the present day Zaria town and later proceeded to an area in Kaduna state and founded Fadan Karshi. They also moved from there and founded what is the present day Karshi Town in the Federal Capital Territory. Their first place of settlement is called KUPAYI around 1366, which is about 5 km west of the present day Karshi and 27 km away from the Federal Capital City. It is located on the hills called KONGURU for security purpose. The name KARSHI emanate from the words “UNGUWAR KASHI” which means an area were bones are gathered. As hunters, the bones of the animals are gathered in one place. This was later shortened to KARSHI.

Due to rapid growth and development in other to give room for expansion and easy access to move down the hills to a plain area and founded the present day KARSHI. This movement was initiated in 1945 by Alhaji Mamman Na-Aura, the 25th Emir of Karshi. Initially Karshi was part of Zaria Emirate; the Turakin Zazzau (Zaria) who represented the Emir of Zaria was the overseer of the Administration of Karshi. However, with the advent of colonial era and indirect rule, the colonial masters decide to merge Karshi with the Keffi Native Authority (NA). This solved the problem of distance from Karshi to Zaria and the cumbersomeness of the administrative framework.

== Administration ==
Karshi remained with Keffi Native Authority (NA) till 1976 when the new Federal Capital Territory was carved out of some neighboring state then Plateau state. This issue of relocation brought division among the people of Karshi. The then Chief of Karshi, Alhaji Mamman Na-Aurah decided to remain within the Federal Capital Territory while others migrated and were resettled in some parts of the then Plateau State. These areas, in what is now Nasarawa state, include new Karshi, Ara, Tudun Wada, Masaka, Takalafiya, etc.

Since inception, Karshi have had 27 Emir's. The first chief of Karshi was Mallam Danbaba from Kano who ruled for a period of 30 years (1366–1396). The 26th chief of Karshi was HRH Alhaji Abdulkadir Mamman who ruled for 12 years (1983–1995). The present Chief of Karshi HRH Alhaji Ismaila Danladi Mohammad ascended the throne since 1997 till date.

== Institutions and offices ==
- Karshi Satellite Town Development Department (STDD),
- Karshi General Hospital,
- Karshi NTA Booster Station,
- NASENI Solar Energy Limited (NSEL),
- Amac Community Radio Station

== Schools ==
- Pilot Science Primary School Karshi which was the first school in 1945,
- Government Secondary School Karshi was established in 1981,
- Vocational Training and Technical College Karshi,
- Junior Secondary School Karshi,
- Fosla Football Academy,
- Satellite Academic Karshi,
- Aura Central Nursery and primary Karshi
- Islamic Foundation Nursery and Primary school Karshi,
- Agape International school Karshi,
- Zara Nursery and Primary school Karshi

== Commerce and Agriculture ==
Karshi Central market is one of the oldest market in the Federal Capital Territory which attracted people far from the neighboring state such as; Niger state, Nasarawa and Kogi state to buy and sell.

Farming is the predominant occupations of Karshi people that yield to large production of agricultural product such as Yam tuber, cassava tuber, grain maize, rice, millet, sorghum, and groundnut|. Karshi weather conditions are very favorable for agricultural product with average temperature from 22 Celsius to 38 Celsius.

== Associations and Unions ==
- Karshi Development Association (KADA),
- Karshi Future Youth Forum now known as Karshi Youth Forum (KYF),
- Karshi Students Union (KASU),
- Karshi Football United (KFC),
- Karshi People's Congress (KPC), and others

=== Royal Council ===
The royal lineage of karshi Abuja is restricted to only members of the royal family. No person outside the royal family, no matter his wealth and popularity becomes the chief, unless he is from the royal family. The selection, nomination, and election of the new Chief commence immediately on demise of the throne Chief, the eldest son or someone from a different rolling (royal house) are eligible to contest the seat and ascend the throne.

The nomination or election process of a new chief is done by the SHARAKI who are the council of kingmakers, the SHARAKI constitute of seven men committee namely; The Madaki-leader, Galadima, Wambayi, Todo, Rijawa, Boruwa, and Nkama Totoro. These council of kingmakers are not eligible to contest because they are from the female side while those eligible to contest are the; Sarkin-Pada, Makama, Turaki, Barde, Ciroman, Santali all of these council of chiefs are from the male side.

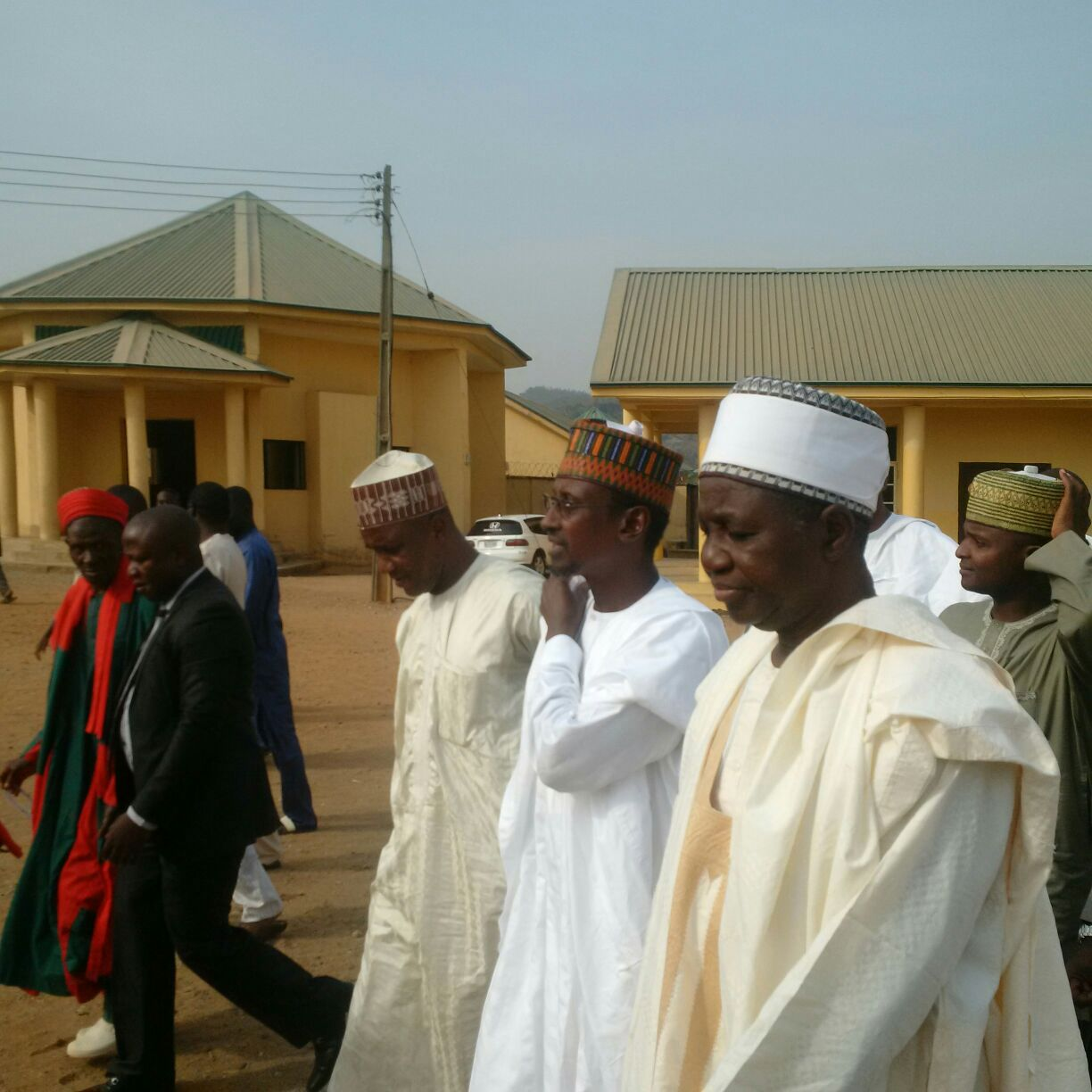

However, in 1945 Mamman Na-Aura moved the community from Kupai to karshi today where Alhaji Isma'ila Mohammed Danladi is now the Emir. In 1987 during the movement for creation of FCT, there was a moved to resettled the people of karshi. Alh mamman Na-Aura refused to moved, Alh. Mohammed Bako then a member of plateau state house of assembly led a group of people to the present site located between Rafin kwara and Tudun wada now in Nasarawa state for resettlement projects.

The resettlement committee chaired by Usman Sabo Ago built a palace and some houses for those who are willing to be resettled subsequently Alh. Mohammed Bako became the first Emir of new karshi in 1981 expanding the Karshi Emirate Council.

=== Name of Karshi Chief's From 1366 - date ===
1. Mamman Danbaba from Kano 1366–1396,
2. Ibrahim Danbaba 1396–1416,
3. Sharki 1416–1441,
4. Bawa Ara 1441–1460,
5. Mamman kigama 1460–1492,
6. Osoko 1492–1512,
7. Sharki Akwara 1512–1527,
8. Bakwa 1527–1556,
9. Aura 1556–1566,
10. Akwara II 1566–1575,
11. Sharki Bakwa II 1575–1627,
12. Ari 1627–1666,
13. Yakubu 1666–1682,
14. Aura Sogo 1682–1700,
15. Bakwa 1700–1727,
16. Obayaya 1727-1727,
17. Bakwa kiga 1727–1747,
18. Ndawa 1747–1815,
19. Bahago 1815–1840,
20. Aura 1840–1860,
21. Mamo 1860–1890,
22. Aura fadanku 1890–1916,
23. Wakayi 1916–1932,
24. Kokosha 1932–1944, Alhaji Mamman Aura 1944–1983,
25. Alhaji Abdulkadir Mamman 1983–1995,
26. Alh Isma'ila Mohammed Danladi 1997 to date

=== Sharki Mamman Na-Aurah ===
Mamman Na-Aurah was a Prince from Nani Ada Dende lineage of ancient royal stool of karshi. He was born in 1900 by Aurah the son of Aurah Fadanku, the 22nd Sarkin karshi. His mother was late Ama Amagwadu, a Gade woman from old Owa village (now part of Rafinkwara village, Nasarawa state). At age 40 Mammam Na-Aura, ascended the throne of his forefathers as 25th Sarkin Karshi in 1944. One year later, he led the movement of his people from old settlement of "KUPAYI" to the present day "KARSHI". He did his elementary school cum Qur'anic studies at keffi, Nasarawa state then plateau. He was appointed as Malami (secretary) of Mai Angwa (village sectional head) at keffi after his graduation and later promoted within a very short time to the post of Malami (secretary) of Madaki keffi. Na-Aurah was a devout Muslim and a jihadist per excellence who led a successful Islamic revolution that bring to the enthronement of Islam in his immediate milieu and its neighborhood. Immediately he assumed the position of leadership of his community, the natives were predominantly pagans. He established the first Mosque in karshi by demolishing a known traditional shrine, he stop the age long customary prohibition by native unbelievers of giving out their daughters to Muslims irrespective of his origin & used to pay bad with good and forgive evil acts with corresponding good. As a resilient believer in Islamic faith and practice which was commonly viewed as religion of Hausa's by his predominantly native unbelievers, he was named as ADANGWE (the father of Hausa Muslims).

Mamman had one of the earliest contact with Western education and was an educated traditional ruler. He was instrumental to the establishment of the first primary school in Karshi community now known as Aura primary school. Na-Aurah also encourages farming, hunting and other legal businesses to be done in his domain.
