= Gidan Mangoro =

Gidan Mangoro is a town in Karu, Nasarawa State.
