= Auta Balefi =

District in Nasarawa State, Nigeria

- Town
- Location in Nigeria
- Coordinates: 8°56′49″N 7°40′44″E
- Country: Nigeria
- State: Nasarawa
- Local Government Area: Karu

Auta Balefi is a fast developing district in central Nigeria. This town is located in Karu Local Government Area of Nasarawa State. It lies close to Abuja, the capital city of Nigeria in the Federal Capital Territory of Nigeria. Popular institutions located in this town include, Birgham University Campus (ECWA); Living Faith Church, Goshen City; The Redeemed Christian Church of God, Redemption Camp, Auta gurgu; and some developing estates. This district is rapidly growing due to its closeness to the Federal Capital Territory, Abuja.
