= Muhammadu Bako III =

Emir of New Karshi, Nigeria

- Reign: 8 February 2016 - present
- Coronation: 17 August 2017
- Predecessor: Alhaji (Dr) Muhammadu Bako II
- Born: Muhammadu Sani Bako; April 22, 1972 (age 54); Karshi
- House: Kidan Sarkin Karshi
- Father: Dr Muhammadu Bako II
- Religion: Islam
- Occupation: Emir of New Karshi

Muhammadu Sani Bako III (born April 22, 1972) is a prominent member of Gwandara people and a first-class Emir of New Karshi in Nasarawa. He was a career federal civil servant. He is a senior member of Nasarawa State Council of Traditional Rulers, and chairs the Governing Council of Nasarawa State Polytechnic, Lafia. He holds a Doctor of Philosophy, PhD in Political Economy and Development Studies from the University of Abuja. He was the Magajin Garin Karshi.

== Early life and education ==
Bako was born in New Karshi to His Royal Highness Muhammadu Bako II of the ruling family of Kokosa. He was born the heir apparent to the New Karshi Emirate throne. At age five in 1977, he enrolled in Karshi primary school where he obtained first school leaving certificate in 1982. He attended Government Secondary School, Karshi between 1982 and 1987, graduating with a West African School Certificate. In 1989 he was admitted to the School of Preliminary Studies, Keffi for a two-year preparatory for university admission. He holds a Bachelor of Art degree in History from the University of Jos (1995); a Postgraduate diploma in Business Administration from the Abubakar Tafawa Balewa University, Bauchi (2000); and a Doctor of Philosophy, PhD in Political Economy and Development Studies from the University of Abuja.

== Civil service career ==
He started his civil service career in 1997 at Federal Mortgage Bank of Nigeria. In 2001, he switched to Ministry of Women Affairs and Youth Development. From 2004 to 2006 he served at Ministry of Intergovernmental Affairs, Youth Development and Special Duties. In 2007, he was deployed to Ministry of Youth Development after it split from the larger ministry. He left civil service in 2016 to become Emir.

== Ascension ==
Bako II was crowned the first Emir of New Karshi on January 2, 1981, with a fourth class status in ranking. On January 1, 1997, the throne was upgraded to third class traditional ruler status by the pioneer military administrator of Nasarawa State, Wing Commander Ibrahim Abdullahi. In August 2002, it was elevated to second class status and then first class status in May 2007 by Governor Abdullahi Adamu of Nasarawa State. Bako II reigned for over 30 years before his death in 2016 at age 76.

Emir Bako III was selected by Karshi Emirate council of king makers and recommended to Governor Umar Tanko Almakura for approval and appointment. On February 20, 2016, Governor Almakura announced his appointment. He was presented the staff of office in August 2017 by Governor Al-Makura of Nasarawa State.

=== Community service ===
In a surprise move to help his subjects, Emir Bako III in 2017 mobilised Karshi, Rafin Kwarra, Pyanko, Gidan Maigagah, Gidan Waziri, Orozo and Zokonu for community service to fill potholes on the roads and fix three collapsed bridges along Karshi/Rafin Kwarra and Pyanku road.
