= Ara Town =

- Town
- Location within Nigeria
- Coordinates: 8°35′N 7°35′E
- Country: Nigeria
- State: Nasarawa State
- LGA: Nasarawa
- Elevation: 333 m (1,093 ft)
- Time zone: UTC+1 (WAT)

Ara Town is a town found in the Nasarawa Local Government Area of Nasarawa State in central Nigeria. The town is found in the western part of Nasarawa State with the Federal Capital Territory of Nigeria (FCT) border passing by the western part of the town. The town is about 220 km away from the state capital, Lafia.

== Tourism ==
Ara Town is home to the Ara Rock which stands facing the town, and is a popular tourist attraction.
