= Laminga =

- Town
- Location within Nigeria
- Coordinates: 8°40′N 7°49′E
- Country: Nigeria
- State: Nasarawa State
- LGA: Nasarawa

Government
- Elevation: 298 m (978 ft)
- Time zone: UTC+1 (WAT)

Laminga is a town in Nasarawa Local Government Area of Nasarawa State in central Nigeria. The town sits along the Keffi - Nasarawa road, about 20 kilometers along the highway in the western part of Nasarawa state.
