= Kuchikau =

Kuchikau is a village in Karu Local Government area of Nasarawa State in the Middle Belt of Nigeria.
