= Marmara Town =

Populated place in Nigeria

Coordinates: 11°7′18″N 8°34′31″E

Marmara Town is found in Nasarawa Local Government Area of Nasarawa State in central Nigeria. The town sits along the Keffi–Nasarawa road in the western part of Nasarawa state.
