= Alizaga =

Eggon
- Town
- Nickname: Eggon
- Location within Nigeria
- Coordinates: 8°44′N 8°33′E
- Country: Nigeria
- State: Nasarawa State
- Time zone: UTC+1 (WAT)

Alizaga is a small town in Eggon local Government Area, Nigeria. Which is part of small area in Eggon. the Eggon Post Office is also located in Alizaga Its along the A3 highway north of Lafia, the capital of Nasarawa State.
