= Mararaba =

Human settlement in Nigeria

Coordinates: 9°01′36″N 7°36′26″E

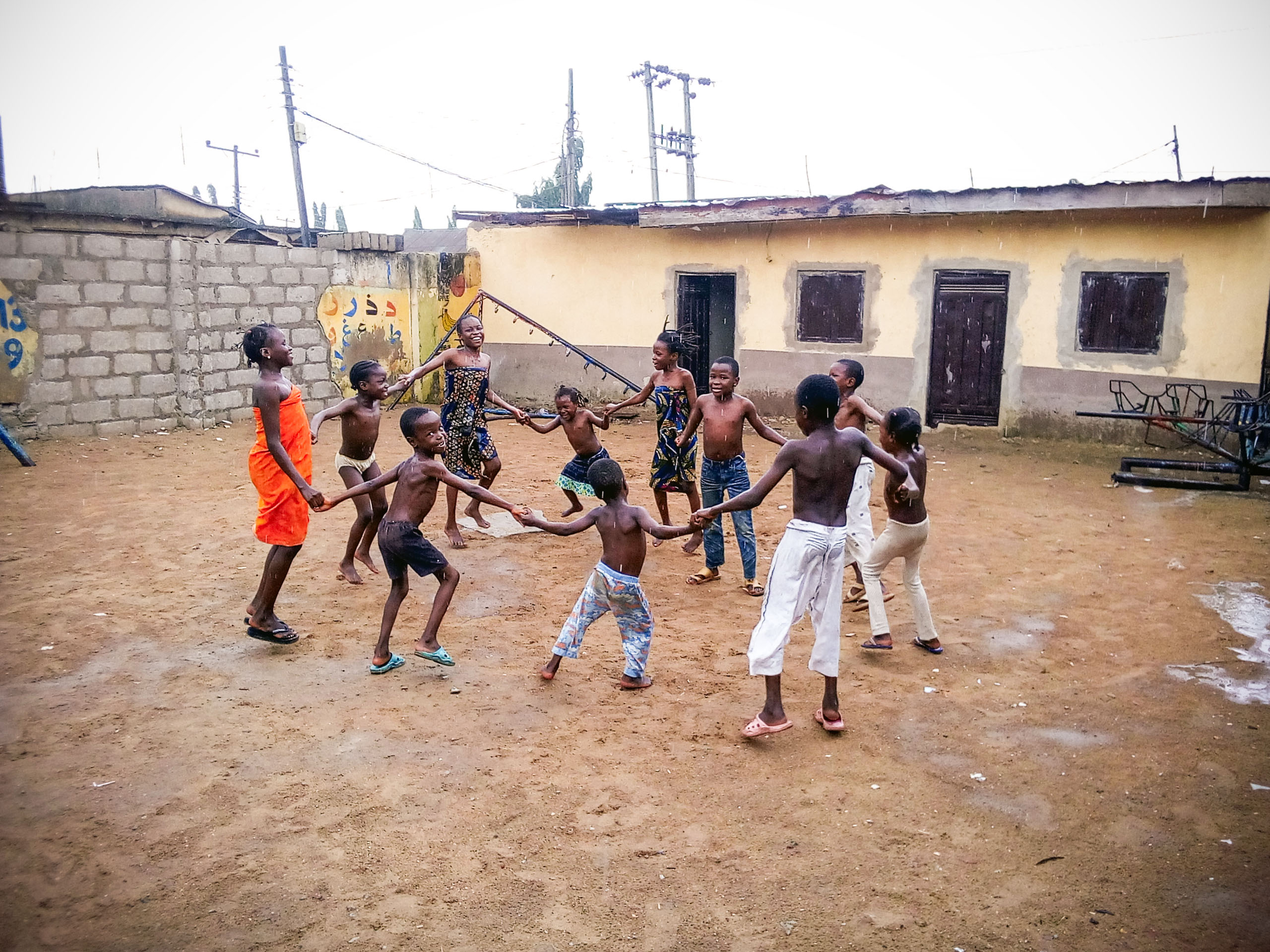
Children rejoicing during the first rainfall of the year in Mararaba.

Mararaba is a town in Nasarawa State, central Nigeria. It is a district of Gurku Chiefdom under Karu Local Government Area, Nasarawa State and is among the towns that make up the Karu urban area, a conurbation of towns stretching to Nigeria's Federal Capital Territory. Its neighbouring towns are:

- Ado
- Nyanya
- New Nyanya
- Masaka
- Old Karu
- New Karu and Koroduma are villages that grew, as a result of the rapid growth and expansion of administrative and economic activities of Abuja into neighbouring towns, coupled with the evacuation of tens of thousands of people from Abuja by the Federal Capital Territory (Nigeria) (FCT) administration. Mararaba is believed to be one of the most densely populated suburbs around the Nigerian capital city Abuja and this contributes to its reputation as having one of the busiest road channels with traffic jams stretching as much as 11 kilometers from the popular A.Y.A. junction during rush hours. Mararaba also has various markets e.g. mararaba market etc.

The indigenes of Mararaba are the Gbagyi people.

== Economy ==
Mararaba is a densely populated area, and this population has directly led to a massive increase in commercial activities. There are 3 major markets in Mararaba which are Mararaba Market, Orange Market and Muhammadu Buhari International Market. Mararaba generates the most revenue for Nasarawa state and it is referred to as a diverse-town because of the high number of people from different parts of Nigeria living there.
