= Yelwa Doma =

Town in Nigeria

Coordinates: 8.279°N 8.310°E

Yelwa Doma is a populated place located in Nasarawa State, Nigeria. It is located approximately 16 kilometres (9.9 mi) south of the town of Doma.

== See also ==
- Doma, Nigeria – a Local Government Area in Nasarawa State, its headquarters are in the town of Doma.
