= Shabu Town =

Shabu-Kwandare Lafia North
- Great Town
- Location within Nigeria
- Coordinates: 8°34′N 8°33′E
- Country: Nigeria
- State: Nasarawa State
- LGA: Lafia

Government
  - Type: Lafia North Emirate
- Elevation: 242 m (794 ft)
  - Density: 1,000/km^{2} (2,600/sq mi)
- Time zone: UTC+1 (WAT)

Shabu-Kwandare is a towns in Nasarawa state Capital's Lafia. It is a district of Lafia urban area, Nasarawa Stadand is among the towns that forms the Lafia urban area, a conurbation of towns under Lafia Local Government Area of Nasarawa State.[1] The neighbouring towns to Lafia, also in this urban area as a result of their merger following a population explosion in the zone, are: 1.

== Festival ==
Durbar festival is celebrated in almost all 19 northern state including the Lafia emirate, it is celebrated to mark the end of "holy fasting" in the month of Ramadan known as Eid-El-fitr.

There are three durbar with first commencing as soon as the Emir enter his palace courtyard after observing the Eid prayer, the 2nd durbar is horse riding from the palace to the Government and the last is when the Emir rides in beautiful horses and his entourages, warriors and acrobats sees his subjects on the road and this is known as Hawan Gida Gwamnati.
