= New Karshi =

- Town
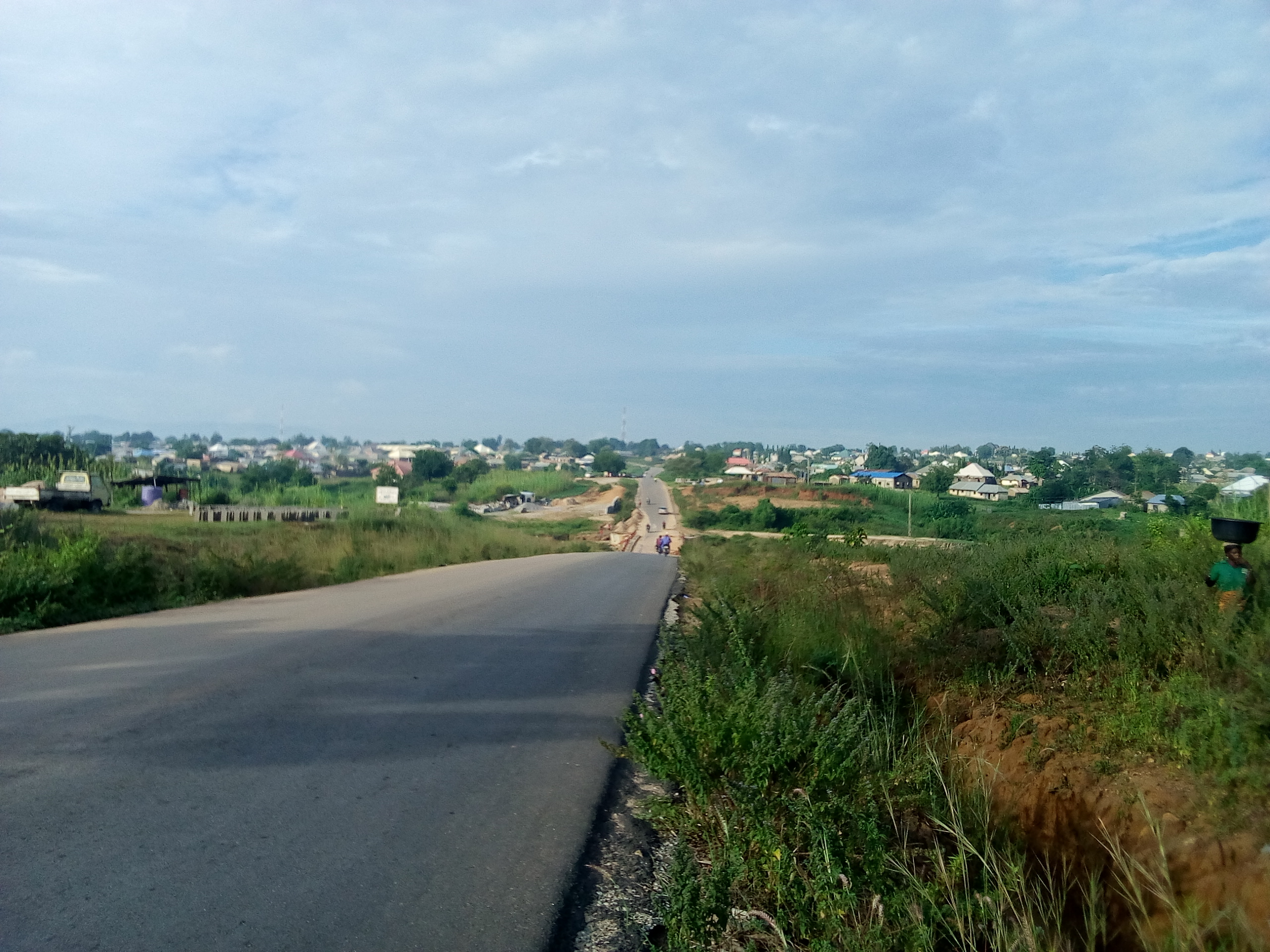
- Skyline of New Karshi from the north axis entrance
- Interactive map of New Karshi
- Country: Nigeria
- State: Nasarawa
- District: Karu LGA
- Established: 1980
- Founder: Alhaji (Dr) Muhammadu Bako II
- Seat: Emir Palace

Government
  - Type: Monarchy
  - Emir: Dr Muhammadu Bako III

Population (2006 Census population growth projection)
  - Total: 25,000
- Time zone: West Africa Time (Lagos)

New Karshi is a town in Karu Local Government Area of Nasarawa State, Nigeria, founded in the 1980s by Muhammadu Bako II. It is a semi-autonomous local government created out of Karu LGA as Karshi Development area with the administrative secretariat in Uke. Karshi has a local government chairman as its administrative head and a seat in the Nasarawa State House of Assembly. Emir of Karshi Emirate, Alhaji (Dr) Muhammadu Sani Bako III, a first class chief is the traditional head of New Karshi. It has a population of about 30,000 people. The predominant tribes are Gwandara, Gbagyi, Gade, Bassa and Hausa.

New Karshi is 30 kilometers or about 50 minutes drive to Abuja city center on a traffic free period and 25 kilometers or 35 minutes drive to Keffi. It is bounded by Nasarawa Local Government to the South, Keffi Local Government to the East, the city of Abuja to the West.

== Geography ==
=== Climate ===
New Karshi has almost same climate with Abuja, and under Köppen climate classification features a tropical wet and dry climate. It experiences three weather conditions annually. This includes a warm, humid rainy season and a blistering dry season. In between the two, there is a brief interlude of harmattan occasioned by the northeast trade wind, with the main feature of dust haze and dryness.

The rainy season begins from April and ends in October, when daytime temperatures reach 28 °C (82.4 °F) to 30 °C (86.0 °F) and nighttime lows hover around 22 °C (71.6 °F) to 23 °C (73.4 °F). In the dry season, daytime temperatures can soar as high as 40 °C (104.0 °F) and nighttime temperatures can dip to 12 °C (53.6 °F). Even the chilliest nights can be followed by daytime temperatures well above 30 °C (86.0 °F). The high altitudes and undulating terrain of the Federal Capital Territory (FCT) act as a moderating influence on the weather of the territory. The city's inland location causes the diurnal temperature variation to be much larger than coastal cities with similar climates such as Lagos.

Rainfall in the FCT reflects the territory's location on the windward side of the Jos Plateau and the zone of rising air masses with the city receiving frequent rainfall during the rainy season from April to October every year.

== History ==
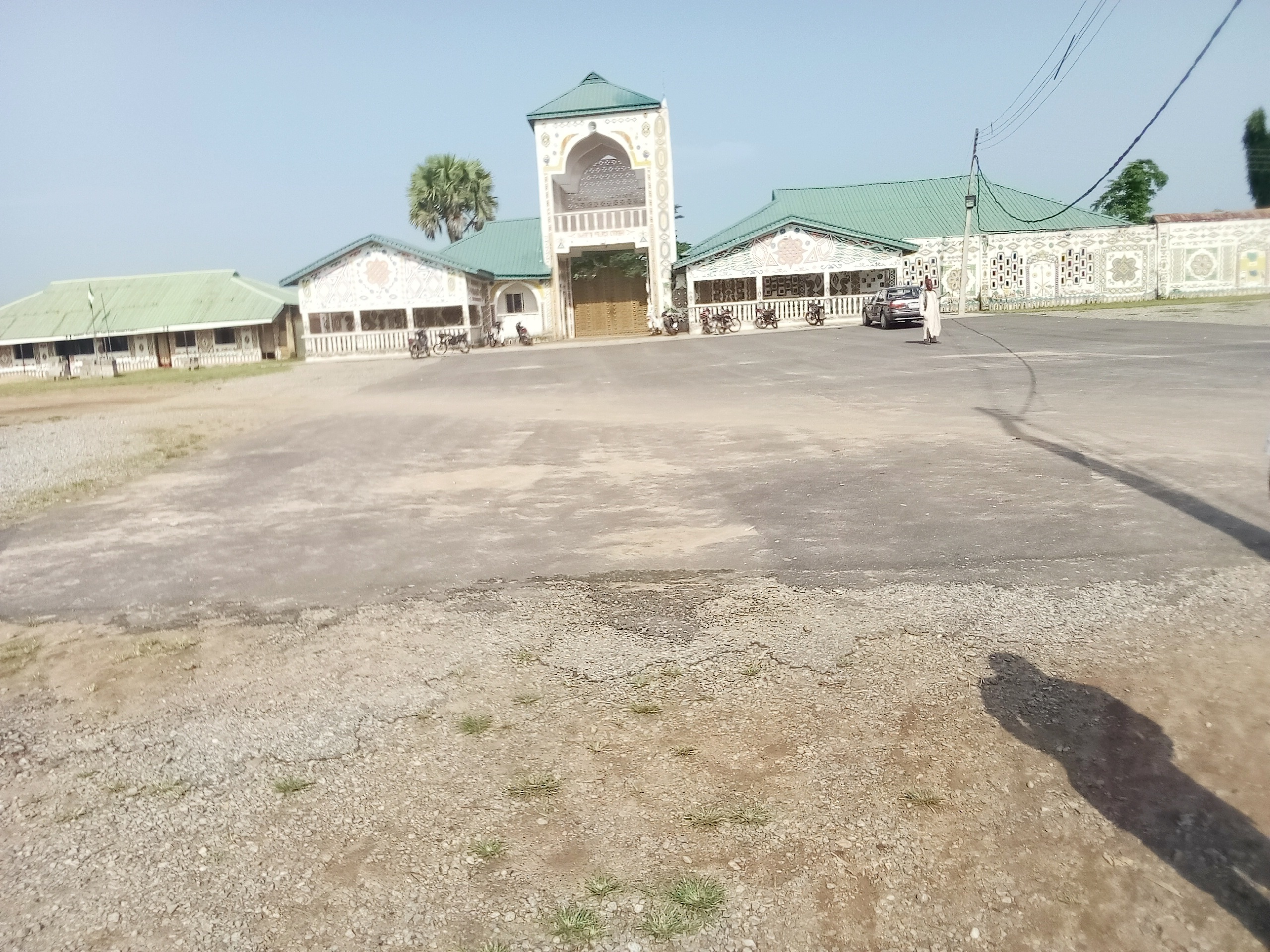
The front view of the palace of Emir of New Karshi, Nasarawa State, Nigeria

New Karshi in Nasarawa State was founded by Alhaji (Dr) Muhammadu Bako II and approved as a resettlement town for the inhabitants of Karshi Abuja in the Nigeria federal capital in 1980 by the former civilian Governor of Plateau State, chief Solomon Daushep Lar. The native inhabitants of Karshi in Abuja were ordered to vacate their native land as a result of the movement of Nigeria capital from Lagos to Abuja to solve the problem of over crowding and heavy traffic jam around the seat of power then in Dodan Barrackas, in the city of Lagos. The military government of general Murtala Mohammed in 1976 promulgated Decree No.6 creating Abuja as new Federal Capital Territory of Nigeria. The Decree ceded ownership of Abuja land to federal government declaring it a neutral territory where no individuals, or ethnic groups who had inhabited the area for centuries could claim ownership of the land. The decree ordered immediate vacation of the territory of those that had been living there. Consequently, the Decree created funds for relocation and settlement of the natives in places of their choice outside the area mapped for the federal capital territory, preferably their home states.

However, the movement of Nigeria seat of power was delayed because of the assassination of General Murtala Mohammed in a military coup just months after he commenced work for the relocation of the federal capital territory from Lagos to Abuja. His second-in-command General Olusegun Obasanjo took over power and commenced the implementation of the master plan for the new capital part of which was resettlement and compensation of the natives of the land. But General Obasanjo could not complete the process of transfer of seat of power from Lagos to Abuja before handing over power to democratically elected President Shehu Shagari in 1989.

On 12 December 1991 seat of power was finally moved from Lagos to Abuja by General Ibrahim Babangida. But resettlement of the original inhabitants outside the new capital city had not been executed as planned because politicians altered the original plan of total relocation of the inhabitants from the new capital city before the transfer of seat of power to Abuja for political benefits. While Decree No.6 declared Abuja no man's city and ordered comprehensive evacuation and resettlement of the inhabitants, President Shehu Shagari of National Party of Nigeria, NPN deviated from the original plan of total evacuation of the natives and made it optional for inhabitants to either go to their respective states of origin or remain in the federal capital territory and that they will be treated equally with other neighboring states. This was done by President Shagari for political advantage over opposition political parties notably Nigerians People's Party, NPP that was then in control of Plateau State.

Nigeria Federal Capital Territory, Abuja was created out of Niger, Kwara and Plateau States. To have its own citizens back in its territory and to weaken President Shagari influence, Governor Solomon Daushep Lar - the first democratically elected Governor of Plateau State who was very popular and influential sent a delegation to Karshi to persuade the people to move to the area that was to become New Karshi so that they could own their land because the federal capital is by the Decree which established it remained ‘no man’s land’, that is every land belongs to the federal government of Nigeria, which Karshi was among.

The delegation from Plateau State made an offer to the people of Karshi that if they opted for relocation to the proposed New Karshi under plateau state, their chieftaincy title would be elevated from District Head to a full graded traditional ruler having powers over its domain. Interestingly, officials from federal capital territory working under the directive of government of Shehu Shagari also offered to upgrade the chieftaincy title of Old Karshi if they choose to remain within the federal capital territory. This was viewed as a counter campaign strategy of NPN against NPP and an attempt to divide the people.

A faction of the people of Karshi accepted the offer of Plateau State government to resettle in New Karshi and had their chieftaincy title elevated to a higher rank. The resettlement process was started by chief of Karshi, Alhaji Manman Aura with the help of Alhaji Danladi Yakubu then deputy governor of Plateau state and director of resettlement, Alhaji Usman Sabo Ago. Karshi chief Alhaji Manman Aura proposed a place called “Lagga” ‘Runbun Nama’ for resettlement. It was a place blessed with a lot of wild animals and frequently visited by hunters. It is situated between Kurafe and Bakin Kogi.

But the resettlement process ran into challenges because a member of Plateau State House of Assembly representing Karshi people, Alhaji Muhammadu Bako II who moved the motion for the resettlement rejected Lagga Runbun Nama as a resettlement because he was not consulted. Other reasons he gave for the rejection were that Lagga Runbun Nama was waterlogged or Fadama area which would make it difficult for people to build houses and that the place was home to evil spirits such as jinns, witches, wizard, wild animals among others. As a result of this Dr Muhammadu Bako II quickly rushed home with colonel Madugu representing Plateau state government and founded the present New Karshi now in Nasarawa State. Alhaji Dr Muhammadu Bako II became the founder and the first Emir of New Karshi. The chief of Karshi refused to leave because he was not in support of the movement to New Karshi. Some of the people who supported Emir Bako II in the transition from old Karshi in FCT to New Karshi in Nasarawa State were Alhaji Suleiman Madaki (Mallam Sabo), Alhaji Musa Sarkin Noma Majidadi and Mallam Musa Manman (Akwala) Wambai of Karshi.

== Social Amenities ==
=== Health facility ===
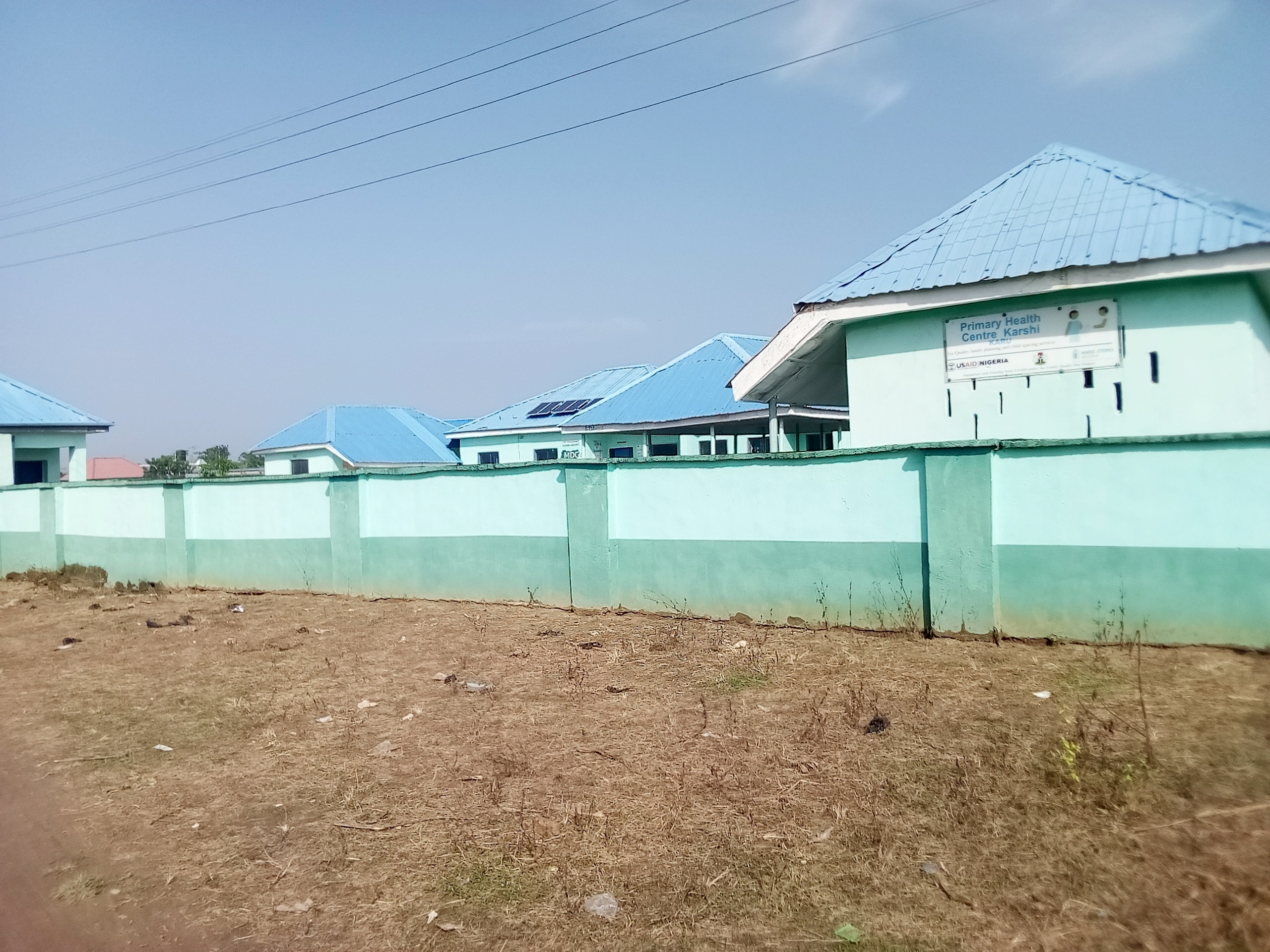
MDG primary health care center, New Karshi, Nasarawa State

The main health care center in Karshi town is Millennium Development Goals (MDGs) Primary Health Care clinic built in 2013 to take care of health needs of the community especially women and children with wards designated for them. Pregnant women attend antenatal classes there. Cases that cannot be handled at the MDGs clinic are often referred to Uke general hospital about 7 kilometers or 10 minutes drive from Karshi. The Uke general hospital has a number of doctors and medical and laboratory equipment common in most general hospitals in Nigeria. The hospital is stocked with Petroleum Trust Development Funds (PTDF) funded drugs that make treatment cheap and affordable. Another reference hospital to the MDGs clinic is Federal Medical Center, Keffi which is 26 kilometers or about forty minutes drive. Old Karshi general hospital in Abuja is 10 kilometers or 7 minutes drive from New Karshi.

=== Education ===
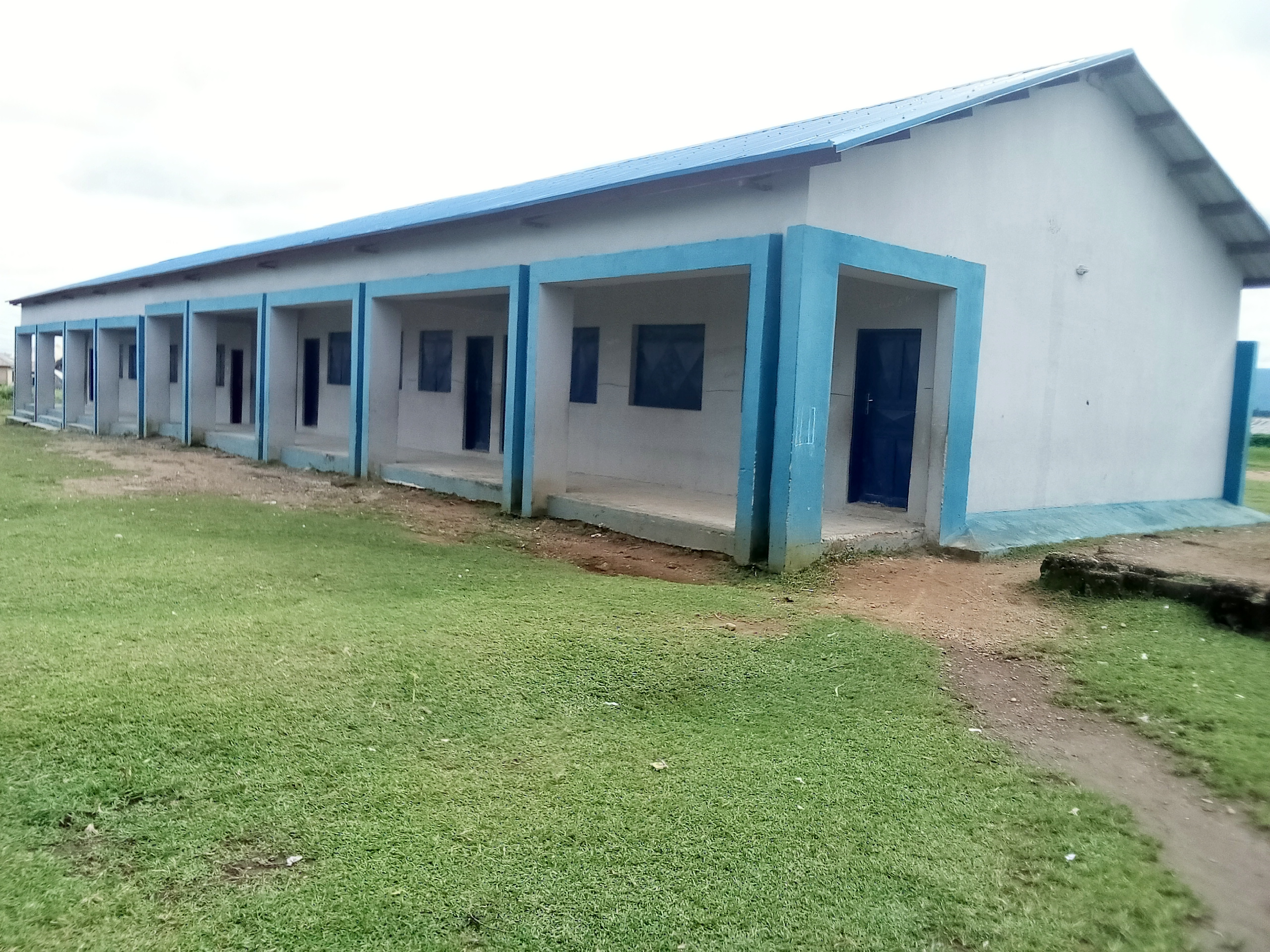
Public Primary School, New Karshi

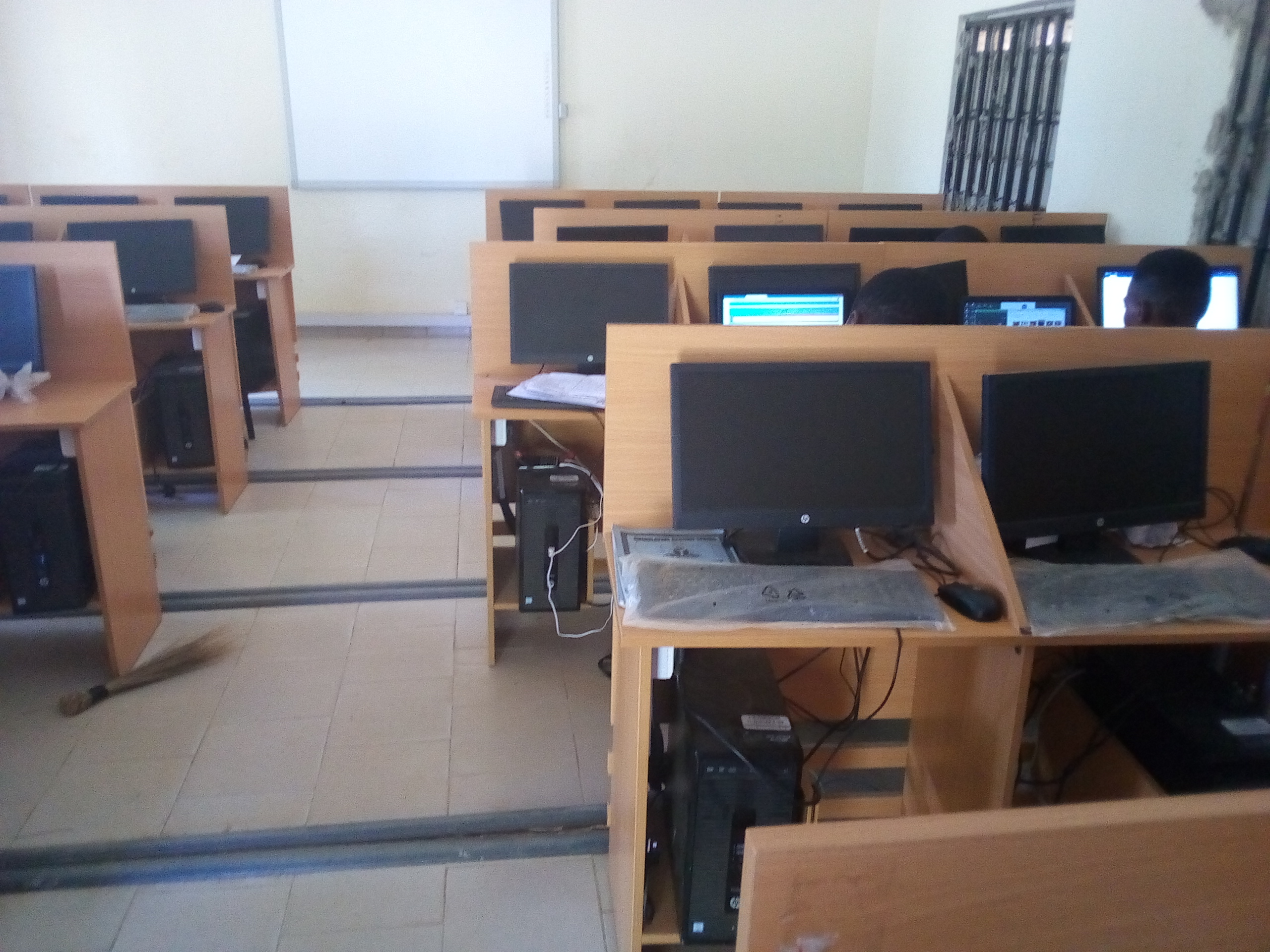
Information and Communication Technology, ICT Laboratory, Government Secondary School, New Karshi

Karshi has a number of schools both public and private. There are two public schools which are Karshi Primary school and Karshi Government Secondary School. In 2017 the state government built a new block of four class rooms and two offices with standard teaching facilities and office equipment for the primary school to enhance learning. In 2018 two blocks of six class rooms and offices were built in the secondary school under Universal Basic Education Commission direct intervention scheme- a federal government of Nigeria programme to build and upgrade structures in school across the federation. The secondary school has a well-equipped information and communication technology (ICT) laboratory with 40 units of computers, a projector, high speed broadband connection (LAN and WAN) which is 24 hours solar powered built by Nigeria Communications Commission, NCC.

== Economy ==
Karshi has a relatively diverse economy with 60% in agriculture, 30% commercial activities in trading of grains and other household products and 10% from white-collar jobs contributing to the economy.

=== Agriculture ===
Agriculture is the pillar of Karshi economy contributing sixty percent. It has a vast fertile soil with good and predictable climatic conditions suitable for cultivation of various grains and other staples such as yam and cassava. There is a community of farmers both small and large scale farmers engaging in farming activities making fresh foods especially vegetables available all year round. Almost every household has a farm growing what they eat. The commonly cultivated crops are maize, beans, rice, soybeans, melons, millet, sorghum, groundnut, yam, and cassava. During harvest, prices of food items are low but a bit higher in off peak season.

There is booming aquaculture and livestock farms in Karshi with well built fish ponds and poultry farms producing fish and eggs in large scale commercial quantities supplying to Abuja and other places. Several thousands of fresh eggs are lifted daily.
