= New Karu =

Headquarters of Karu Local Government Area, Nasarawa State

New Karu is the headquarters of Karu Local Government Area, Nasarawa State. It is one of the largest towns that make up the greater Karu urban centre in Nasarawa state which is a conurbation consisting of towns and villages along the Keffi-Abuja expressway making up the Nyanya-Masaka urban centre. The major towns that make up this urban area are;

- Mararaba,
- Ado,
- New Nyanya,
- Masaka,
- New Karu and Kurunduma and villages that grew up as a result of the expansion of administrative and economic activities of Abuja into neighbouring towns coupled with the evacuation of tens of thousands of people from Abuja by the Federal Capital Territory (Nigeria) (F C T) administration.

Voices, a BBC World Service radio soap opera, is recorded here. Queen Elizabeth of England visited the actors in New Karu in 2003.

New Karu is home to the Government Science Secondary School, which had some 580 students as of 2006.
