= Kurunduma =

Town in Nigeria

Coordinates: 9°0′58″N 7°31′46″E

Kurunduma is a suburban town in Abuja Municipal area council (Asokoro Village), Nigeria. It is a major town around Asokoro Area, a conurbation of towns within Abuja's metropolitan area. Its neighbouring towns are:

- New Nyanya
- New Karu
- Guzape
- AYA
- Kurunduma village was formed as a result of the rapid growth and expansion of administrative and economic activities of Abuja into neighbouring towns, coupled with the evacuation of tens of thousands of people from Abuja by the Federal Capital Territory (Nigeria) (F C T) administration.
