= New Nyanya =

Coordinates: 8.5705°N 8.3088°E

New Nyanya is a town in Nasarawa State. It is a district of Karu Local Government Area, Nasarawa State, and is among the towns that make up the Karu Urban Area, a conurbation of towns stretching into the Federal Capital Territory (FCT). New Nyanya is loosely considered as part of the metropolitan area of Abuja.

Its neighbouring towns are Mararaba, Ado, Masaka, New Karu and Koroduma and villages that grew, as a result of the rapid expansion of administrative and economic activities of Abuja, into neighbouring towns, coupled with the evacuation of tens of thousands of people from Abuja by the Federal Capital Territory Administration (FCTA).

Most of the inhabitants of New Nyanya belong to the Gbagyi people.
