= Karu, Nasarawa State =

Karu
- LGA
- Interactive map of Karu
- Country: Nigeria
- State: Nasarawa State
- Headquarters: New Karu

Government
  - Esu Karu: Pharmacist Luka Panya Baba

Area
  - Total: 2,640 km^{2} (1,020 sq mi)

Population (2006)
  - Total: 205,477
  - Density: 77.8/km^{2} (202/sq mi)
- Time zone: UTC+1 (WAT)
- Postal code: 961

Karu is a Local Government Area in Nasarawa State, central Nigeria. It is close in proximity to the Federal Capital Territory of Nigeria. It has an area of 2,640 km^{2}. Karu local government has its headquarters in New Karu town. It was originally built to house the capital's civil servants and lower income families, but had no running water or good sanitation system. Karu has grown in population beyond its original planned capacity. Ensure Administrative convenience and bring government closer to the grass root people, Karshi Development Area was created with its administrative secretariat at Uke.

The local government area is home to mainly the Gbagyi and Bassa people.

== Demographics ==
According to the 2006 census, the population of mainly New Karu town was 205,477.

== Economy ==
The majority of the population of Karu LGA works in agriculture, and the region is well-known for cultivating crops like yam, maize, salad greens, and tomatoes. Trade is booming in the region as well, and it is home to a number of marketplaces, including the very popular Karu International Market. Hunting and leather work are two more significant economic activity in the Karu Local Governments Area.

== Geography/Climate ==
The average temperature in Karu LGA, which has a total size of 2640 square kilometres or 1020 square miles, is 29 degrees Celsius or 84 degrees Fahrenheit. A 1250 mm annual average rainfall is predicted for the region, and an average wind speed of 9 km/h is predicted for the local Governments Area.

In Karu, the dry season is hot and partially cloudy, and the wet season is warm, unpleasant, and cloudy. It rarely falls below 56 °F or rises over 102 °F throughout the year, with the average temperature fluctuating between 62 °F and 95 °F.

A daily high temperature of 92 °F is typical during the 2.5-month hot season, which runs from January 28 to April 13. With an average high temperature of 95 °F and low temperature of 72 °F, March is the hottest month of the year in Karu.

A daily high temperature below 84 °F is typical during the 3.6-month cool season, which runs from June 21 to October 8. December, with average lows of 62 °F and highs of 89 °F, is the coldest month of the year in Karu.

=== Cloud cover ===
The average proportion of sky that is covered by clouds in Karu varies significantly seasonally throughout the year.

In Karu, the clearer season starts about November 7 and lasts for 3.6 months, coming to a close around February 24.

In Karu, January is the clearest month of the year, with the sky remaining clear, mostly clear, or partly overcast 53% of the time on average.

Around February 24 marks the start of the year's cloudiest period, which lasts for 8.4 months and ends around November 7.

May is the cloudiest month of the year in Karu, with the sky being overcast or mostly overcast 84% of the time on average during that month.

== Education ==
Loyola Jesuit College is in Gidan Mangoro, Karu. K-Bols International School is in Auta Balefi, New Karu.

St. Augustine's College is in New Karu, Karu.

== Transportation ==
The Karu urban area is served by an express way connecting Karu to Abuja, Nigeria's capital city, and to other parts of the country.

== Postal code ==
The postal code of the area is 961.

== Villages ==
- Kuchikau
- One Man Village
- Masaka
- Uke
- Tudunwada

== See also ==
- Greater Karu Urban Area
