= Ajiya Abdulrahman =

Nigerian politician

Ajiya Abdulrahman is a Nigerian politician. He currently serves as a member of the House of Representatives representing Abaji/Gwagwalada/Kwali/Kuje (Abuja South) constituency of FCT Abuja in the 10th National assembly.
