= 2023 Nigerian presidential election in the Federal Capital Territory =

- 25 February 2023
- Opinion polls
- Registered: 1,570,307
- Turnout: 30.48%
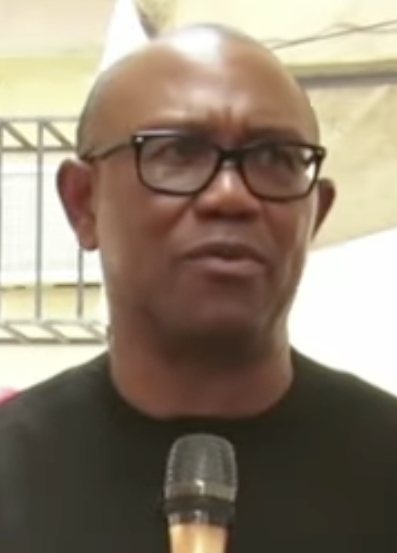

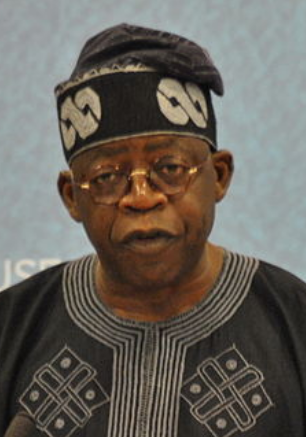

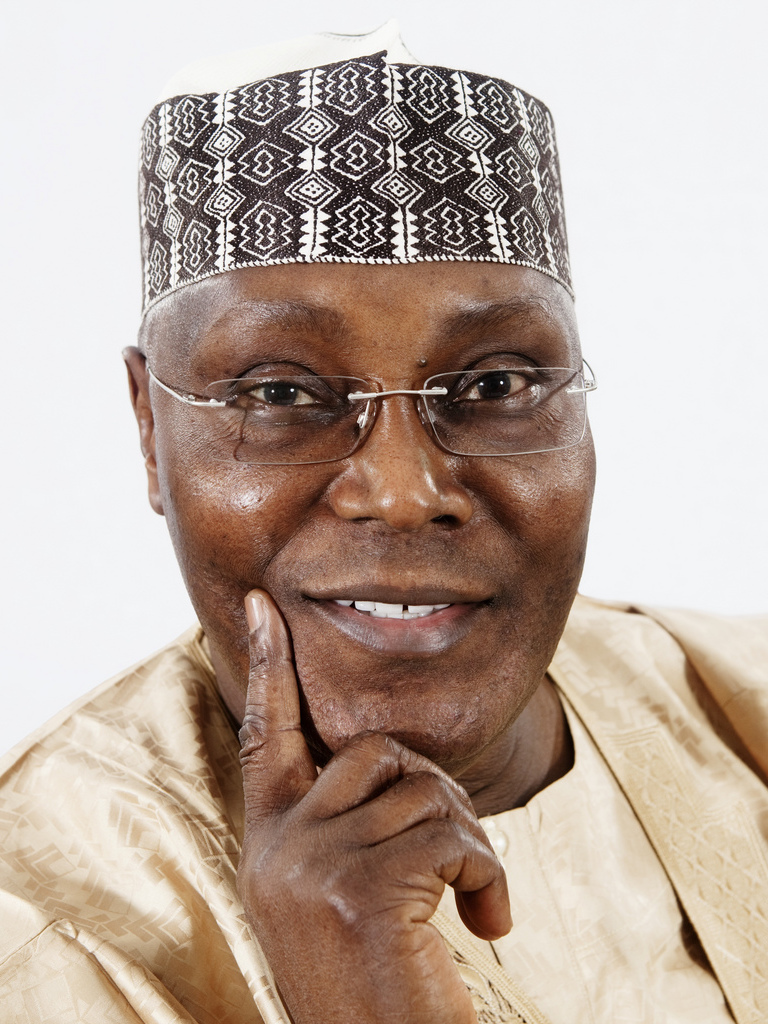
| Nominee | Peter Obi | Bola Tinubu | Atiku Abubakar |
| Party | LP | APC | PDP |
| Home state | Anambra | Lagos | Adamawa |
| Running mate | Yusuf Datti Baba-Ahmed | Kashim Shettima | Ifeanyi Okowa |
| Popular vote | 281,717 | 90,902 | 74,199 |
| Percentage | 61.22% | 19.76% | 16.13% |
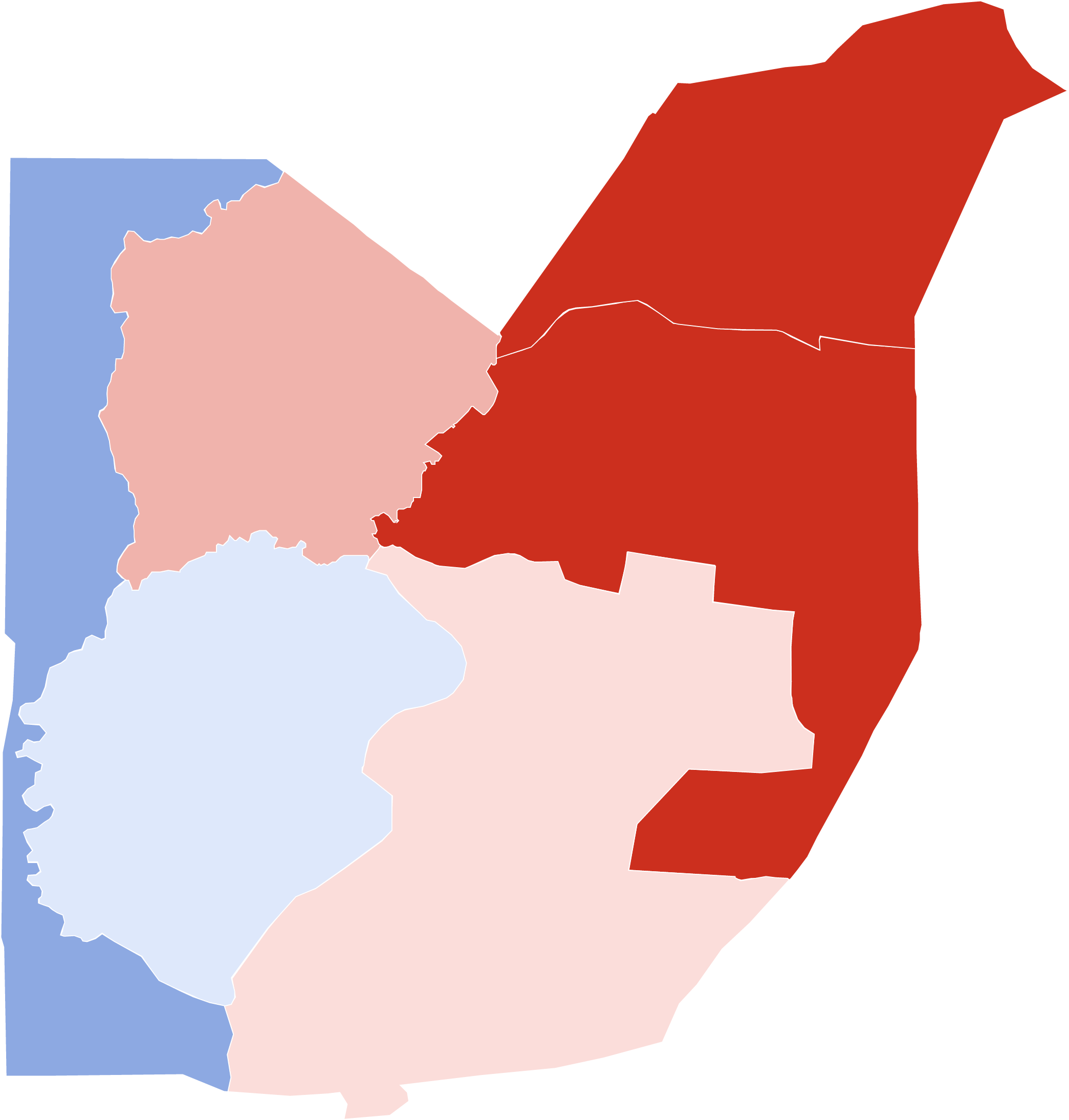
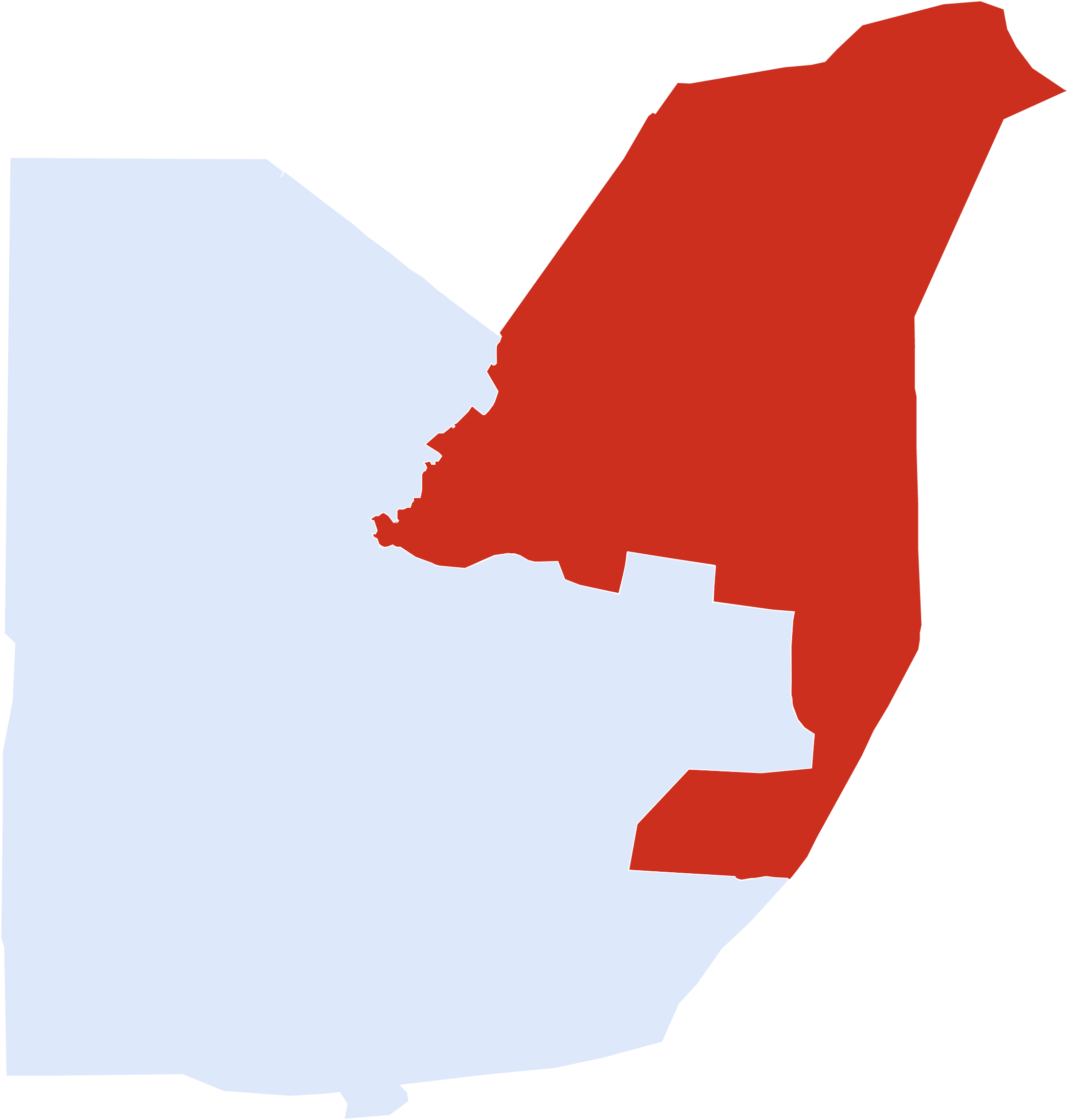
- Results Tinubu: 30–40% 50–60% Obi: 30–40% 40–50% 70–80%
President before election
Muhammadu Buhari
APC
Elected President
TBD

The 2023 Nigerian presidential election in the Federal Capital Territory was held on 25 February 2023 as part of the nationwide 2023 Nigerian presidential election to elect the president and vice president of Nigeria. Other federal elections, including elections to the House of Representatives and the Senate, will also be held on the same date while state elections will be held two weeks afterward on 11 March.

== Polling ==
| Polling organisation/client | Fieldwork date | Sample size | | | | | Others | Undecided | Undisclosed | Not voting |
| Polling organisation/client | Fieldwork date | Sample size | Tinubu APC | Obi LP | Kwankwaso NNPP | Abubakar PDP | Others | Undecided | Undisclosed | Not voting |
|---|---|---|---|---|---|---|---|---|---|---|
| BantuPage | December 2022 | N/A | 11% | 44% | 3% | 6% | – | 11% | 10% | 14% |
| Nextier (FCT crosstabs of national poll) | 27 January 2023 | N/A | 8.6% | 62.9% | 2.9% | 20.0% | 5.7% | – | – | – |
| SBM Intelligence for EiE (FCT crosstabs of national poll) | 22 January-6 February 2023 | N/A | 6% | 68% | – | 23% | 2% | 1% | – | – |

== Projections ==
| Source | Projection | | As of |
|---|---|---|---|
| Africa Elects (Note: Africa Elects projections predict the likelihood of a candidate winning a state by categorizing a state as "Safe" for exceedingly likely, "Likely" for somewhat likely, and "Lean" for least likely. If no clear determination could be made, states are categorized as "tossups".) | Likely Obi | | 24 February 2023 |
Dataphyte (Note: Dataphyte projections predict candidates' projected votal shares in each state.)
| Dataphyte | Tinubu: | 33.01% | 11 February 2023 |
| Dataphyte | Obi: | 28.90% | 11 February 2023 |
| Dataphyte | Abubakar: | 20.68% | 11 February 2023 |
| Dataphyte | Others: | 17.41% | 11 February 2023 |
| Enough is Enough- SBM Intelligence (Note: EiE-SBM projections predict which candidates will win states.) | Obi | | 17 February 2023 |
| SBM Intelligence (Note: SBM projections predict which candidates will win states or, if no determination could be made, categorizes states as "Too close to call" (TCC).) | Abubakar | | 15 December 2022 |
| The Nation (Note: The Nation projections predict which candidates will win states or, if no determination could be made, categorizes states as "Battlegrounds.") | Battleground | | 12-19 February 2023 |

== General election ==
=== Results ===
2023 Nigerian presidential election in the Federal Capital Territory
| Party | Candidate | Votes | % |
|---|---|---|---|
| A | Christopher Imumolen | | |
| AA | Hamza al-Mustapha | | |
| ADP | Yabagi Sani | | |
| APP | Osita Nnadi | | |
| AAC | Omoyele Sowore | | |
| ADC | Dumebi Kachikwu | | |
| APC | Bola Tinubu | | |
| APGA | Peter Umeadi | | |
| APM | Princess Chichi Ojei | | |
| BP | Sunday Adenuga | | |
| LP | Peter Obi | | |
| NRM | Felix Johnson Osakwe | | |
| New Nigeria Peoples Party | Rabiu Kwankwaso | | |
| PRP | Kola Abiola | | |
| PDP | Atiku Abubakar | | |
| SDP | Adewole Adebayo | | |
| YPP | Malik Ado-Ibrahim | | |
| ZLP | Dan Nwanyanwu | | |
| Total votes | | | 100.00% |
| Invalid or blank votes | | | N/A |
| Turnout | | | |

==== By federal constituency ====
The results of the election by federal constituency.

| Federal constituency | Bola Tinubu APC | | Atiku Abubakar PDP | | Peter Obi LP | | Rabiu Kwankwaso NNPP | | Others | | Total valid votes |
| Federal constituency | Votes | % | Votes | % | Votes | % | Votes | % | Votes | % | Total valid votes |
|---|---|---|---|---|---|---|---|---|---|---|---|
| Abaji/Gwagwalada/Kwali/Kuje Federal Constituency (Note: Comprising the local government areas of Abaji, Gwagwalada, Kwali, and Kuje.) | 48,150 | 36.21% | 36,957 | 27.80% | 44,127 | 33.19% | 1,177 | 0.89% | 2,549 | 1.92% | 132,960 |
| AMAC/Bwari Federal Constituency (Note: Comprising the local government areas of Abuja and Bwari.) | 42,752 | 13.07% | 37,242 | 11.38% | 237,590 | 72.63% | 3,340 | 1.02% | 6,194 | 1.89% | 327,118 |
| Totals | 90,902 | 19.76% | 74,194 | 16.13% | 281,717 | 61.23% | 4,517 | 0.98% | 8,741 | 1.90% | 460,071 |

==== By local government area ====
The results of the election by local government area.

| Local government area | Bola Tinubu APC | | Atiku Abubakar PDP | | Peter Obi LP | | Rabiu Kwankwaso NNPP | | Others | | Total valid votes | Turnout (%) |
| Local government area | Votes | % | Votes | % | Votes | % | Votes | % | Votes | % | Total valid votes | Turnout (%) |
|---|---|---|---|---|---|---|---|---|---|---|---|---|
| Abaji | 10,370 | 50.70% | 6,888 | 33.68% | 2,874 | 14.05% | 104 | 0.51% | 216 | 1.06% | 20,452 | 31.60% |
| Abuja | 29,596 | 12.70% | 26,407 | 11.33% | 170,392 | 73.12% | 2,463 | 1.06% | 4,161 | 1.79% | 233,019 | 31.47% |
| Bwari | 13,156 | 13.98% | 10,835 | 11.52% | 67,198 | 71.41% | 877 | 0.93% | 2,033 | 2.16% | 94,099 | 34.29% |
| Gwagwalada | 15,890 | 32.98% | 10,987 | 22.81% | 19,694 | 40.87% | 483 | 1.00% | 1,128 | 2.34% | 48,182 | 28.54% |
| Kuje (Note: Kuje: Voting in thirteen polling units were disrupted by hoodlums who destroyed BVAS machines. Additionally, one polling unit was affected by a non-functional BVAS machine.) | 10,648 | 29.69% | 10,028 | 27.96% | 14,257 | 39.76% | 266 | 0.74% | 663 | 1.85% | 35,862 | 27.79% |
| Kwali (Note: Kwali: Results in two polling units were cancelled due to overvoting.) | 11,242 | 39.50% | 9,054 | 31.81% | 7,302 | 25.65% | 324 | 1.14% | 542 | 1.90% | 28,464 | 32.10% |
| Totals | 90,902 | 19.76% | 74,194 | 16.13% | 281,717 | 61.23% | 4,517 | 0.98% | 8,741 | 1.90% | 460,071 | 30.48% |

== See also ==
- 2023 Federal Capital Territory elections
- 2023 Nigerian presidential election
