= Hassan Usman Sokodabo =

Nigerian politician

Member of the House of Representatives of Nigeria from Federal Capital Territory
- Constituency: Abaji/Gwagwalada/Kuje/Kwali

Personal details
- Born: 1969 (age 56–57)
- Citizenship: Nigeria
- Party: Peoples Democratic Party
- Occupation: Politician

Hassan Usman Sokodabo is a Nigerian politician. He is a member representing Abaji/Gwagwalada/Kuje/Kwali Federal Constituency in the House of Representatives.

== Early life ==
Hassan Usman Sokodabo was born in 1969.

== Political career ==
In the 2022 primaries, he contested amongst other rivals and won the Peoples Democratic Party (PDP) ticket. He proceeded to eventually win at the 2023 National Assembly elections, making his second term in the House of Representatives. Sokodabo was formerly the chairman of the Abaji Area Council and commissioner representing the FCT in the Federal Character Commission (FCC). Together with another lawmaker, he sponsored a bill on the state control of Value Added Tax (VAT). As form of support and empowerment to his constituency, he distributed sewing machines, hair dressing machines, sprayers, agro chemicals, generators and grinding engines. He also gave out 670 bags of rice as palliative in Gwagwalada to address the lockdown effect amongst his constituents, as a of the Coronavirus outbreak.
