= List of villages in the Federal Capital Territory, Nigeria =

Villages in the Federal Capital Territory, Nigeria

This is a list of villages and settlements in the Federal Capital Territory, Nigeria organised by local government area (LGA) and district/area (with postal codes also given).

== By postal code ==
LGA	District / Area	Postal code	Villages
Abaji	Abaji	905101	Agyana; Bago; Bandagi; Dapala; Ebagi; Gbogbogo; Kebba; Manderegi; Nah. Tosho; Nahalati Sabo; Nuku; Panagana; Rimba; Uboshenu; Yawule
Abaji	Yaba	905102	Abuja; Adagba; Afo; Akori; Alampa; Allu; Ayaba; Bari-Bezi; Bazi-Bezi; Busga; Chakun; Chundugo; Dabbare; Dara; Dewu; Domi; Dum; Madechi; Ekki; Fakon Tando; Gadabiri; Gari; Gasakba; Gasukpa; Gawu; Gawun; Gidan Maisaye; Gurdi; Guruza; Gwanda; Gwona; Jamigbe; Kafako; Kpace; Kularida; Kutara; Kwago; Kwakwa; Kyawu; Lafia Yaba; Managi; Nadichi; Nagun; Nassarawa; Nowog; Nyembo; Pako Base; Panagu; Pandaji; Pankuru; Panpari; Piowe; Sabongida; Sarowo-Abdu; Selifulyu; Shadad; Soitan; Takpeshi; Talpa; Tanaga; Wapa; Yelwa; Yelwa Gawu; Zuwa
Abuja Municipal Area Council (AMAC)	Garki	900104	Abacha Barracks; Apo; Damagaza; Dantata; Durumi I; Durumi II; Durumi III; Dutse; Garki Village; Gudu; Guzape; Kobi; Kurumduma; NEPA Village; Wumba
Abuja Municipal Area Council (AMAC)	Gui	900105	Airport; Barowa; Damakuba; Dandi; Dayisa; Dodo; Gbenduniya; Gbessa; Gora; Gosa; Gud Pasali; Gui; Gwako; Iddo Maaji; Iddo Pada; Iddo Sabo; Iddo Sarki; Iddo Tudunwada; Koloke; Makana; Makanima; Nuwalogye; Sauka; Takilogo; Toge; Tunga Kwaso; Tungan Jika; Tungan Wakili Isa; Zamani
Abuja Municipal Area Council (AMAC)	Gwagwa	900106	Bagusa; Dei-die; Filin Dabo; Filin Dabo I; Filin Dabo II; Gwagwa; Kaba; Kagini; Karsana I; Karsana II; Karsana III; Saburi I; Saburi II; Tasha; Zaudna
Abuja Municipal Area Council (AMAC)	Gwarinpa	900108	Gwarinpa Fed. Housing; Gwarinpa Life Camp; Gwarinpa Village; Kado Federal Housing; Kado Village; Katampe; Kuchigoro; Mabushi; Utako
Abuja Municipal Area Council (AMAC)	Jiwa	900102	Basan Jiwa; Gyeda; Hulumi; Idu; Idu Gwari; Jiwa; Karmo Sabo; Karmo Tsoho; Paipe; Tungan Dallatu; Tungan Madaki; Zhidu
Abuja Municipal Area Council (AMAC)	Kabusa	900107	Aleyita; Burum; Dogori Gada; Galadimawa; Kabusa; Ketti; Lokogoma; Lugbe; Piwoyi; Pykasa; Sabon Lugbe; Sheretti; Takushara; Wani; Zhidu; Zidna
Abuja Municipal Area Council (AMAC)	Karshi	900101	Aleku; Damakasa; Damakusa; Gidan Boyi; Gidan Kaka; Gidan Kwano; Karshi; Kupayi; Kusaki; Kutasa; Odu; Tunga; Ugamada; Ungwan Tiv
Abuja Municipal Area Council (AMAC)	Karu	900110	Jikwoyi; Karu Site (FHA); Karu Village
Abuja Municipal Area Council (AMAC)	Nyanya	900103	Angawa Bawa; Gbagarape; Kugbo; Nyanya Site-Area A-F; Nyanya Village/Gwandara; Nyanya Village/Gwari
Abuja Municipal Area Council (AMAC)	Orozo	900109	Ajata; Angwan Sako; Anka; Badna; Chori Bisa; Gidan Ajiya; Gidan Mangoro; Gugugu; Kpepegyi; Kurudu; Kurudu Gwandara; Kwoi; Madalla; Munapeyi Kasa; Munapeyi Sama; Orozo I; Orozo II; Sabon Gari; Wowo
Bwari	Bwari	901101	Apugye; Barago; Baran Rafi; Barangoni; Barapa; Bazango Bwari; Bunko; Byazhi; Chikale; Dankoru; Dauda; Donabayi; Duba; Dutse Alhaji; Gaba, Galuwyi; Gidan Babachi; Gidan Baushe; Gidan Pawa; Gudupe; Gutpo; Igu; Jigo; Kaima; Karaku; Karawa; Kasaru; Katampe; Kawadashi; Kawu; Kikumi; Kimtaru; Kogo; Kubwa; Kuchibuyi; Kuduru; Kurumin Daudu; Kute; Kwabwure; Panda; Panunuki; Paspa; Payi; Piko; Rugan S/Fulani; Ruriji; Sabon Gari,Sagwari; Shere; Simape; Sumpe; T/Danzaria; T/Manu; Tokulo; Tudun Wada; Tunga Bijimi; Tunga-Adoka; Tungan Sarkin; Ushafa; Yaba; Yajida; Yaupe; Gyeyidna; Zango; Zuma
Gwagwalada	Gwagwalada	902101	Agota; Akwayi; Akyakyata; Alu wamo; Anguwar Hausawa; Anguwar Sarki; Atopi; Auguwar-Madaki; Bargada Bassa; Basan Zuba; Bassa; Biyu; Boka; Chaboda; Chitumu; Chzako; Dabagayi; Dada; Dada Gongo; Dadabiri; Damin Kara; Dawaki; Didan Tujura; Diko; Dikwa Gwari; Dikwa Kotwa; Dobi; Doni; Doruwa; Eabodo; Garin Godoso; Gbadolo; Gerin Angulu; Gidan Ango; Gidan Bala; Gidan Dandu; Gidan Gade; Gidan Golo; Gidan Yaro; Goi; Goi Sabo; Gongo; Gulupe; Gurebare; Gurfa Gongo; Gurfata; Gurfata Sabo; Gwako; Gwale; Gwari; Gwaywalada; Gyabiri; Hanagada Abdu; Hanagada Bassa; Ibbo; Ibwa; Ibwa Sarki; Ikwa; Isom Bassa; Isom Fulani; Jalita Gongo; Jigodo I; Jiwape; Kaburufi; Kace Bassa; Kace Sabo; Kace Sarki; Kaida Bassa; Kaida Gwari; Kaida Sabo; Kalangu; Kasanki; Kpatawuro; Kutabwche; Kutunku; Kuturpe; Kwalikuzi; Lafiya; Ledi; Ledi Sabo; Madaki Abuche; Maikaraya; Maje Bassa; Maje Tsoho; Makama; Momo Sabo; Pabeyi; Pagada; Pagena I; Paiken Korce; Paiko; Pajana II; Pako; Paso Gwari; Pass Kutawa; Patte; Rafin Zurfi; Rain Zurfi; S/Ganuwa; Sabo; Saboda; Sabon Gari; Shaga I; Shaga II; Shajantara; Shanagu; Shara Bassa; Shibo; Shibo Bassa; Shida; Shidhida; Shinge; Soko; Tsagban Siji; Tsaunia Kura; Tsudna; Tundun Wada; Tung Tsauni; Tunga Makeri; Tungan Adamu; Tungan Auta; Tungan D. Kolo; Tungan Giwa; Tungan Jika; Tungan Kakaki; Tungan Ladan; Tungan M. Hassan; Tungan Maikasuwa; Tungan Pada; Tungan S. Pada; Tungan Salihu; Tungan Tsauni; Ung Gade; Ung. Bassa; Ung. Gwari; Wagu Wase-Gyan; Wuma; Wumi; Wurumbi; Wuye-Wuye; Yaluan Ibwa; Yemipe; Zuba
Kuje	Kuje	903101	Damwa; Achmbi; Aduga; Agwai; Atsauna; Baban Kurmi; Bamishi; Banayi II; Barayi Pada; Bugako; Buzunkure; Chegasu; Chibiri; Chida; Chukuku; Dafara; Damakusa; Damangata; Dibe Pada; Dibepe; Dubia; Dudagwari Yamma; Dude; Duma; Duriya; Fafere Tsolo; Gadoro Pada; Gafere Sabo; Ganagu Sabo; Ganaju Sabo; Gando; Gashe; Gaube; Gawu; Gbebasa; Genge-Pada; Gidan Jatau; Gidan-Bawa; Gidid Gwari; Gidigwai II; Ginagu Gwari; Gonge; Gumayi; Gunagu Gwari; Gunfufu; Gwadaji; Gwape II; Gwari; Gwau-Kurmi; Gyawu; Iye; Jaida II; Jeli; Jigwa Isoho; Jigwa Sabo; Kabi; Kabikasa; Kahodahanmu; Kamo G.; Kanzo; Kapa; Kasada; Kashemolo; Kiyi; Kiyi Basa; Kiyi Ganara; Kiyizhi; Ksayarda Hausa; Ksayarda Sabo; Kuja Pada; Kusaki; Kutada; Kutunibo; Kutuop; Kwaku; Lafiya; Lafiya Gwari; Lamiga; Lanto; Madatta; Maugi; Mogada; Nufawa; Padahi; Paggi; Pami; Pasali; Peki; Pima; Rubokya; S/Gwari Genge; Sabon Gwaria; Sauka; Shaji; Sketuko; Takwa Gwari; Takwa Hausawa; Tuage; Tude; Tukpeki; Tukuba I; Tukuba II; Tunbwa; Uge; Ungwar Galadime; Wumi; Yalwa; Yamma; Yanga; Zangon Kara; Zilu
Kuje	Rubochi	903102	Adegbe; Affa; Ahinza; Attako; Bida; Buga; Darika; Dnago; Gabiya; Gidan Bawa; Gombe; Gova; Gudun Karya; Gwagwada; Gyana; Huni-Gade; Huni-Gwari; Kujekwa; Kule; Kutunbwa; Mabamade; Munu; Odun Bisa; Odun Kasa; Perri; Rubatu; Rubochi; Rugese; Sabe; Sungba; Tika; Tuturutu; Ukya; Ungwar-Madaki; Ure; Yaba; Yewusa; Zagabutu; Zoge; Zokutu
Kwali	Ashara/Kundu	904108	2 Tudu; Ahuwye; Akapo; Angun Tunga; Angun Wakili; Angun Woji Woji; Ashara; Bassoni; Bodolo; Chekanci; Daganaruwa Bassa; Damakusa Gwari; Daniwayo; Eke; Gomani; Gorgbe; Gulo; Gwaji; Gwan auta; Huton; Janruwa; Kona Mada; Kpessili; Kukka; Kukka Bushe; Kundu Lele; Kunguni; Maikwari; Mumun; Nboni; Nzakpara; Padama; Puka; Pukafa; Rarra; Riwaza; Sabo Gari Gurara; Sadaba; Sharra; T. Sarki; Takuro Mallan; Tekpesse; Tudu Wada Mangu
Kwali	Dafa	904102	Azaya; Dafa; Dafa SaboDaji; Galo; Gugwa; Kangon Adamu; Kpewuye; Kye; Puka; Tungan Galadima; Tungan Gani; Tungan Guli; Tungan Tofa
Kwali	Gumbo	904107	Anini; Elle; Gidan Duniya; Gidan Makaniki; Gumbo; Kamadi; Kwaita Hausa; Lukoda; Piri; Shepikati; Tusun Fulani; Tutubwa
Kwali	Kilankwa	904104	Chukuku; Kilankwa I; Kilankwa II; Petti; Sheda Galadima; Sheda Sarki
Kwali	Kwali	904105	Bonugo; Dafara; Ebo; Farakuti; Farakuti I; Farakuti II; Fulani; Kigbe; Koda; Kwaida Tsoho; Kwaita Sabo; Kwali; Lambata; Leda; Police Barracks; Rugan Mal. Idris; Rugan Rabo; Sarki; Yambabu
Kwali	Pai	904101	Bako; Bobota; Ceceyi; Dabi; Kuti Chichi; Leleyi; Leleyi Bassa; Pai Fulani; Pai Gwari; Tatu; Tukurwa
Kwali	Wako	904109	(Ubosharu); Anguwar Baushe; Awawa; Azarachi; Bukpe; Chida; Dangara; Dapa; Gadabiyu; Kibuyi; Sa'adu; Sabon Gari; Ubo Saidu; Wako; Yewuti
Kwali	Yangoji	904103	Adadu 1; Adadu 11; Bwoto; Daka; Ijah Dabuta; Ijah Sarki; Koroki; Kuyi; Nitse; Sukuku; Tampe; Yangoji
Kwali	Yebu	904106	Ebo; Kigbe; Yebu

== By electoral ward ==
Below is a list of polling units, including villages and schools, organised by electoral ward.

LGA	Ward	Polling Unit Name
Abaji	Abaji Central	Ung. Maikano/Kofar Mai Unguwa; Ung. Manko/Kofar Unguwar Manko; Ung. Liman/Kofar Unguwar Liman
Abaji	Abaji North East	Isah M. Gani/Old Ona Palace; Ung. Nupawa/Maternity Centre; Ung. Anyura / Gidan Anyura; Ung. Hussaini Wanzami; Ung. Mallam Mansur; Abaji Ne / Central Pry. School; Sabo Tasha New Development Area; Road Safety Quarters madechi village under yaba ward
Abaji	Abaji South East	Old Onas Palace / Old Onas Palace; Ung Ndamazari / Gidan Ndamazari/Open Space In front Of Gidan Samari; A. U Suleman / Ung. A. U. Suleman; Ung. S. Samari/Ung. S. Samari
Abaji	Agyana/Pandagi	Agyana / Agyana Primary School; Pandagi / Pandagi Primary School; Nanda / Nanda Primary School; Kunguni / Kunguni Primary School; Fct University Of Technology
Abaji	Rimba Ebagi	Ebagi / Ebagi Primary School; Rimba / Rimba Primary School; Naharati Sabo/Naharati Primary School; Naharati Tsoho/Nharati Tsoho Primary School; Tupa/Tupa Primary School; Rimba Gwari/Rimba Gwari Village Square
Abaji	Nuku	Ung. Akwai Allah/Gidan Akwai Allah; Nuku/Nuku Primary School; Abaji East/Abaji East Primary School I; Manderegi/Manderegi Primary School; Kekeshi/ Kekeshi Village; Nuku / Nuku Pry. School; Sabo Gari Phase III New Extension; Low Cost
Abaji	Alu Mamagi	Mamagi/Mamagi Primary School; Alu/Alu Primary School; Mamagi/Mamagi/ Primary School/Mawogi; Paciwa/Paciwa/ Primary School; Chapu/Agulo
Abaji	Gurdi	Gurdi/Gurdi Primary School; Tekpeshe Primary School; Kutakara/Kutakara Primary School; Gulida/Gulida Primary School; Paikon Bassa /Paikon Primary School; Kwakwa/Kwakwa Primary School; Barabari/Barabari Primary School; Chakumi/Chakumi Village Square; Kwakwata Village Square
Bwari	Bwari Central	Bwari I / Central Pry. School; Bwari II / Central Pry. School; Bwari Sarki / Near Chief Palace; Bwari IV / Kogo / Near Fsp Milling; Baran Goni / Pry. School; Gaba / Pry. School; Bwari Across/ Behind General Hospital; Kogo Village; Kogo Village New Extension; Bwari Across Opp. New Mkt Along Scc Road; New Mkt Ext By Scc Road; Baran Goni; Zuma / Zuma Village Square
Bwari	Kuduru	Bwari / Tudun Wada/Jamb Secretariat I; Bwari / Tudun Wada/Jamb Secretariat II; Bwari Staff Qtrs / Security Post Fggc.; Kuchiko C. D. S. / Old Gss Bwari; Sabon Gari / Rugan Fulani Nomadic Primary School; Zango / Bwari Zango; Kuduru / Security Post New Gss Bwari; Tudun Wada Village; Sabon Gari I; Sabon Gari II Jiko Avenue; Sabon Gari III; Guto Village; Kushako /Kushako Village
Bwari	Igu	Igu / Igu Primary School; Tokulo / Tokulo Primary School; Kaima / Kaima Primary School; Panunuke / Panunuke Village Square; Igu Koro / In front Of Chief's Palace; Kiama II
Bwari	Shere	Share Koro / Share Koro Pri. School; Share Gwari / Share Gwari Pri. School; Galuwyi I/ Galuwyi Primary School; Galuwy I I/ Galuwyi Village Square; Sunpe / Sunpe Village; Durumi / Durumi Village Square; Piko / Piko Village Square; Gudupe / Gudupe Village Square; Shere Resettlement Village; Dnaboyi Village
Bwari	Kawu	Kawu/Kawu Primary Sch.; Kurumin Daudu/Kurumin Daudu Village Square; Kaudashi / Kaudashi Square; Padan Gwari Village Square; Tunga Bijimi/Tunga Bimiji Village Square; Adaka Gbagyi Chief's Palace; Dokuma/Dokuma Primary Sch.; Kute/Kute Primary Sch.; Karako/Karako Village Square; Tudun Fulani (Nomadic Centre); Kute II Village Square; Yazhindna Village
Bwari	Ushafa	Ushafa I & II/Ushafa Primary School; Lower Usman Dam/Security Post Opp. Ascon; Jigo/Jigo Primary School; Peyi/Kwaban/Peyi Village Centre; Ushafa II/Kofar Sarki/Ushafa Pri. Sch; Ushafa Pottery Center; Staff Quarters; Gadu Settlements By Nomadic; Ushafa Integration By Police Post; Jigo War College/Jigo Pri. Sch.; Pabware Village
Bwari	Dutse Alhaji	Dutse Alhaji I & II/ Dutse Primary School; Dutse Alhaji III/ Dutse Village/Dutse Village; Sagwari/Sagwari Pri. School; Dawaki/Dawaki Village; Gidan Bawa/Gidan Bawa Village Square; Mpape I/Mpape Primary School; Katampe/Katampe Village Square; Shishipe/Shishipe Village Square; Dutse Ung. Gwari/Dutse Pry School; Dutse Gwari Extension; Dutse Alhaji Zone 6 / 7; Dutse Junction III; Sagwari/Baupma Village/Sagwari Pri Sch.; Dutse Baupma; Sagwari Extension By Customary Court Security Gate; Katampe New Extension; Dawaki New Extension; Dawaki Village; Dawaki News Engineering; Dutse Alhaji By Capville; Katampe Extension I By Grand Square Warehouse; Big Cele Settlements; Mpape T. Junction Before Setraco Gate/Mpape Pry School; Mpape By Ansar Plaza/Mpape Pry School; Mpape Ajegunle Road 1settlements; Mpape Ajegunle Road 1 Settlements II; Katampe Extension By Fcda Office; Katampe Extension By Zeberced At Road Junction; Katampe Extension By Habib Estate
Bwari	Byazhin	Byazhin /Byazhin Primary School; Zhiko/Zhiko Village; Ija Bisa/Ija Bisa Village; Kuchibuyi/Kuchibuyi Village; Paspa / Paspa Village; Chikakore / Chikakore Village; Kugaboku/Kugaboku Village; Byazhin Across Ijayapi Head Bridge; Byazhin Across Ijayapi Pri. Sch; Arab Road, Water Board Junction Settlements; Chikakore New Layout
Bwari	Kubwa	Kubwa Village/Kofar Sarki; Bazango/Kofar Sarki; Kukwaba I/ Kukwaba Market; Kukwaba II/Security Post Nysc Camp; Kukwaba III/Behind Saque Pharmacy; Maitama I & II/Kubwa Primary School; Maitama IV/Kofar Sarki Maitama Sabo; Maitama V/Kofar Sarki Tsoho; Daidai/Daidai Primary School; Daidai Sabo/Sabon Daidai Village; Dakwa/Dakwa Village Square; Kubwa Village By Byazhin Junction; Bazango Garin Hausawa/Bazango Garin Hausawa Open Space; Bazango West; Bazango I & II; Kukwaba/Channel 8; Maitama IV / Jaji Street; Deidei/Etsu Palace; Dei Dei Mopol Barracks; Brick City; Dakwa Village; Dakwa Babachikuri Area; Efab Estate Dakwa
Bwari	Usuma	Phase II Site II/Road Junction In Front Blk 124; Phase II Site II/( B/K 79) At The Back Of B/K 79; Phase I Site1 (Pw I & II)/Pw Primary School; Phase I Sitei (Pw III)/Opp. Living Water Pharmacy; Phase I Site I (Pwiv)/Rd Junction National Mathematical Centre Staff Qtr; Fha 3rd Avenue I/Model Primary School; Fha 3rd Avenue II & III/Security Post Fha Clinic; Berger Camp I & II/ Berger Camp Security Post 7 I; Phase III/Rd Junction Opp. Model School; Phase I Site I/Road Junction Corner Shops; Phase I Site I/Road Junction One-Two Market; Phase IV/Phase IV Junction; Owner Occupier/Security Gate; Pw Mkt By Stage I; 3/3 Junction By Model; Hamza Farm By Nepa Rd; 2/ 1 Extension; Phase IV/Police Affairs; Kubwa Extension III; Phase IV Extension By Christmas Rd; Phase IV Extension By Nafiya Estate; Living Faith/ F 14; Army Estate I; Army Estate II; Kubwa Extension II By Model Mkt. Gate; Kubwa Extension II By Surestart Int. School; Kubwa Model Market Settlements
Gwagwalada	Gwagwalada Centre	Dagiri I /In front Of Village Head's House; Dagiri II /Dagiri Primary School; Dagiri III/ In Front Of Venus House; Sabon-Gari I/Demonstration Pri. Sch.; Sabon-Gari II/Demonstration Pri. Sch.; Sabon-Gari III/Demonstration Pri. Sch.; Ung. Basa I/Old Market Square; Ung. Basa II/ In front Of Tanko's House; Ung. Dodo/In front Of Ward's Heads House; Ung. Dodo/Ung. Dodo Primary School; Timber Shade Area; Dagiri Village; Sabon Gari By Sharp Corner; Gods Own Academy Settlements; Ungwan Dodo
Gwagwalada	Kutunku	Kutunku I/ Primary School; Kutunku II/ Women Centre; Ung. Fulani I/ Health Clinic; Ung. Fulani II/ Town Hall; Ung. Jeshi I I//Daki Jeshi House; Ung. Jeshi I In front Of Chief's House; Ung. Gade/Kofar Gidan Sarki; Women Center; Kutunku Old Abattoir; Radio House Area; Kutunku By Ube
Gwagwalada	Staff Quarters	Phase I/Gado Nasko Pri. Sch.; Phase I/ B & C Gado Nasko Pri. Sch.; Phase II/Op. University Gate; Phase II A/Op. University Gate; Phase III Pri. Sch.; Phase III A / Behind University Of Abuja; Phase III B / Phase III Pri. Sch.; Kontagora New Housing Estate Primary School; Custom Staff Training College; G. S. S. Hajj Camp
Gwagwalada	Ibwa	Ibwa Sarki/Pri. Sch. Ibwa; Rafin Zurfi/Rafin Zurfi Pri. Sch.; Dukwa/Dukwa Pri. Sch.; Gurfata/Gurufata Pri. Sch.; Ika I / II Primary School; Kwamuku Primary School; Ibwa Pada Extension; Military Barracks Dukwa; Ika Village; Kwamuku Village
Gwagwalada	Dobi	Ung. Sarki Dobi / Pri. Sch. Dobi; Ung. Sarki Dobi B & C / Pri. Sch. Dobi; Kaida Sabo/Kaida Sabo Pri. Sch.; Pebeyi/Pebeyi Pri. Sch.; Wumi/Wumi Pri. Sch.; Tungan Sarki Tsuani/Tsauni Pri. Sch.; Kwalita/Kwalita Pry. Sch.; Pagada/Pagada Pri. Sch.; Kpadoro / Kofar Sarki; Unguwan Gade
Gwagwalada	Paiko	Paiko Kore Sarki / Paiko Pri. Sch.; Izom Fulani/Bagada Pri. Sch.; Passo/Passo Pri. Sch.; Kace/Kace Pri. Sch.; Kasanki/Kofar Sarki; Kaida Tsoho/Pry. Sch.; Ung. Madaki; Ungwan Doshi Settlement Before Paiko Town
Gwagwalada	Tungan Maje	Tungan Maje/Tungan Maje Pri. Sch.; Yelwan Zuba/Yelwa Zuba Pri. Sch.; Anagada/Anagada Pri. Sch.; Shanagu/Shanagu Pri. Sch.; Shishida/Kofar Gidan Sarki; Chezeko/Chezeko Pri. Sch.; Ung. Samu/Health Clinic; Tungan Maje/Health Clinic; Sabon Gari/Tungan Maje; Anagada New Extension; Anagada Town
Gwagwalada	Zuba	Ung. Sarki /Pri Sch.; Sabon Gari/Zuba Clinic; Ung. Kasa/In front Of Madaki House; Sabon Kasuwa/Nurtw Office; Sabon Gari/Zuba Clinic (Extension); Ung. Kasa Extension; Beside College Of Education Area
Gwagwalada	Ikwa	Ikwa/Ikwa Pri. Sch.; Tungan Ladan/Pri. Sch.; Shaga/Bassan Zuba /Shaga Pri. Sch.; Chitumu/Kofar Gidan Sarki; Ikwa/Yimi Machada; Angwan Sarki Ikwa
Gwagwalada	Gwako	Gwako Town/Pri. Sch.; Malauni/Kpakuru/Kpakuru Pri. Sch.; Univ. Qtrs/Tukunya/Security Gate; Giri/Giri Pri. Sch.; Kpasele/Kofar Gidan Sarki; Ung. Madaki; Kpasele Extension Called Bass Kpasele U. B. E; Giri
Kuje	Kuje	Kuje Central/Central Pri. Sch.; Kayarda/Kayarda Pri. Sch.; Sauka/ Kofar Sarki; Low-Cost/Mass Agency; Godoji, Godoji/Primary Sch.; Tukpeki, Tukpeki/ Pri. Sch.; Forest; Opposite Deeper Life; Kayarda Opp Deepee Life; Interlectual Sch.; Phase Aa1; Ung. Eggon; Sauka Extension; Sundaba Pri. Sch; Jeda Resettlement; Low Cost Jeida Pri. Sch; Union Homes Estate; Kuchiyako Settlement
Kuje	Chibiri	Chibiri/Chibiri Primary School; Kiyi/Kiyi/Primary Sch.; Shetigo/Shetigo Primary School; Passali/Passali Primary School; Chukuku/Chukuku Primary School; Lanto/Lanto Primary School; Kango Settlement; Fmwh Housing Estate; Passali Opposite Gss; Pasali; Shedadi Settlement
Kuje	Gaube	Gaube/Primary School; Paggi/Primary School; Dibe Primary School; Kusaki / Primary School; Yanga Primary School; Gidigwai /Primary School; Gidan Bawa/ Primary School; Dafara Primary School; Gawu Kurmi/ Primary School; Kahoda Hannu/ Primary School; Gwaupe/ Primary School; Gude / Kofar Sarki; Gapere Settlement; Tukuba Pry. Sch; Peggi Resettlement Estate; Navy Barracks; Gaube Resettlement/Abuja At 30; Kasada Settlement; Dafara By Bimishi Pri. Sch; Cheta Settlement
Kuje	Kwaku	Sabo/Primary School; Kwaku/Primary School; Gadoro/Pri. School; Chida/Primary School; Bugado/Primary School; Gaye Settlement; Gawu Settlement
Kuje	Kabi	Kabi Kassa/Primary School; Kabi Mangoro/Primary School; Agwai/Primary School; Gumayi/ Primary School; Duda / Primary School; Tude/ Primary School; Achimbi / Primary School; Angwan Tiv
Kuje	Rubochi	Rubochi/ Primary School; Rubochi/Kofan Sarki(Old Sarki House); Rubochi/ Ope; Rubochi/Ung. Gade; Attako / Primary School; Kulo / Primary School; Ukya / Primary School; Tika / Primary School; Ubo Gbagyi / Primary School; Toto Gabiya / Primary School; Ahinza / Primary School; Zokutu / Kofar Sarki; Mono Village; Angwan Gade Tika; Ore Village; Sungba Settlement
Kuje	Gudun Karya	Gudun Karya / Primary School; Huni / Primary School; Darka / Primary School; Affa/Primary School; Adegba Tashara/Primary School; Buga/Primary School; Zagabutu/Primary School; Gudun Kar Yagade / Kofar Sarki; Gadabuke Settlement; Buga Gwari; Tashara/ Angwan Gwari
Kuje	Kujekwa	Kujekwa/Primary School; Odu / Primary School; Bida / Primary School; Gidan Bawa/Primary School; Sabe / Kofar Gidan Madaki; Ugbo Maddah; Gbambo Village
Kuje	Yenche	Yenche/Primary School; Gbamfa / Primary School; Gbede / Primary School; Dnago / Primary School; Yaba / Kofar Sarki; Gyana/Angwan Sarki
Kwali	Kwali Ward	Kwali I / Health Centre; Kwali II / Central Primary School; Kwali Yammah / Viewing Centre; Bonugo / Primary School; Ungwan Hakimi / Near People's Bank; Kwali Normardic Rugan Fulani; Overseas Quarters; Old Ecwa Dcc Secretariat; Central Motor Park; Bonugo Village; Unguwan Cashew; Police Barracks; Lambata
Kwali	Yangoji	Yangoji / Primary School; Sukuku / Primary School; Kuroko / Primary School; Ija Pada / Primary School; Ija / Dabuta / Primary School; Ija Tampe/Primary School; Daka Tampe/Primary School; Alheri Village; Unguwan Fulani; Daadu Village
Kwali	Pai	Pai / Primary School; Dabi / Village Square, Near Pub. Toilet; Bako / Primary School; Leleli / Primary School; Ceceyi / Primary School; Leleyi Bassa; Kuchichacha Village; Bobota Village; Dabi Bassa; Bako Forest; Tatu Village
Kwali	Kilankwa	Kilankwa I / Primary School; Kilankwa II / Primary School; Petti / Primary School; Sheda Galadima / Primary School; Sheda Sarki I / Primary School; Sheda Sarki II / Primary School; Kilankwa I/Village Square; Chukuku Tsoho Village; Petti Etsu's Palace; Ung. Liman/ Sheda Sarki; Research Quarters; Shagari Quarters
Kwali	Dafa	Dafa Dada / Primary School; Pada Magaji / Gidan Sarki; Gugwa / Kofar Sarki; Guli / Primary School; Ungwan Mission; Fuka Village
Kwali	Ashara	Ashara / Primary School; Pukafa / Gidan Sarki; Falkara / Kofar Sarki; Fogbe / Primary School; Maikwari / Kofar Sarki; Riwaza / Village Square; Kwanan Mada Kofar Sarki; Takpeshe Kofar Sarki; Kpeselle Village
Kwali	Gumbo	Gumbo / Primary School; Kwaita Hausa / Primary School; Piri / Primary School; Anini Village Square; Kamadi Sabo/Primary School; Kwaita Gangare; Ele Village; Gumbo Village Square; Piri Village; Lukoda Village; Shapkate
Kwali	Wako	Wako/Primary School; Dangara/Primary School; Bukpe/Primary School; Chida/Kofar Sarki; Dangara Kudu/Govt. Sec. Sch.; Yewuti/Primary School; Ubo Sharu/Primary School; Dapa/Kofar Sarki; Wako II / Primary School; Sadu Village; Sabon Gari
Kwali	Yebu	Yebu/Primary School; Kwaita Sabo/ Primary School; Kwaita Tsoho/ Kofar Sarki; Leda/Primary School; Kigbe/Kofar Sarki; Farakuti Kofar Sarki; Yanbabu/Kofar Sarki; Koda Village; Ebbo; Pache Village
Municipal	City Centre	Area I, Sect. I/Area I Pri. Sch.; Area II, Sect. II/F. G. Guest House; Area II, Sect. I I/Park & Garden; Area 2, Sect. I I/Nat. Library, Mokwa Street; Area 2, Sect. I I/Env. Protection Board; Area 2, Sect. I I/Amusement Park Opp. Area II; Area 3/ Shopping Centre, Nysc Dhsq; Area 7/ B/W Blocl I, 8 II Navy Close; Area 8/Opp/ Block Flat 1 Mohd. Buhari Way; Area 10/Post Office; Area 10/Council For Arts / Culture; Area 11/In front Of Block 4 Yelwa Close; Presidential Villa/ Police Affairs Commission; O. V. A./O. V. A. Camp I; O. V. A./O. V. A. Camp II; Sani Abacha Barracks; Aso Hill Berger/ Berger Camp; Area1 Pryimary School Old Fed Sect; Area1 Pry Sch Fcda Qtrs, Area III; Area1 Pry. Sch. Old Fed Secretariat; Wu Bassey Barracks; Sani Abacha Barracks
Municipal	Kabusa	Kabusa/Kabusa Pri. Sch.; Sharite/Shareti Village Centre; Ketti/Ketti Pri. II School; Wuru/Wuru Pry. Sch; Burun/Burun Pri. School; Takunshara/Takunshara Pri. School; Pyakasa/Pyakasa Pri. School; Lugbe I / Ung. Sarki (Gidan Magoro); Lugbe II / Lugbe Pri. Sch.; New Lugbe II/ Market Square; Zhidu-Lugbe/ Zhidu Village Centre; Aleyta/Aleyta Pri. School; Galadima/Galadima Pri. School; Lugbe F. H. A. Gate; Efab Lokogoma Estate; Saraha Estate; Kabusa Esatae; Wasa Village; Pasari Village; Pasali Village; Takalafiya Village; Kings & Kings Academy; Tundun Wada Village; Lugbe II Pri Trade Moore Estate; Aso Estate; Amac Estate I; Amac Estate II; Sun City Estate; Sunny Vale Estate; Alew Word Estate Lokogoma; Lokogoma Village; Fha Gate
Municipal	Gwarinpa	Life Camp/Gate I Minister's Gate; Life Camp II/Market Gate Life Camp; Life Camp III/Gss. Life Camp; Gwarinpa Village/Gwarinpa Pri. School; Kado Estate/Kado Estate I; Kado Estate II/Kado Housing Estate; Jayi Village/ Jayi Village Centre; Jayi Fulani / Jayi Fulani Express Village Centre; Mabushi/Mabushi Pri. School; Utako/Utako Village Centre; Galadima/Galadima Village Centre; Jabi Sarki/Jabi Pri. School; Jabi Maje/Jabi Pri. School; Kado Village I/Kado Opp. Life Camp; Kado Village II/Kado Raya Ung.; Karon-Majigi/Karon-Majigi Pri. School; Kado-Kauchi/ Kado-Kauchi Village Centre; Kuchigoro/Kuchigoro Pri. Sch.; Piwoyi / Piwoyi Pri. Sch.; Finance Qtr's/ Min. Of Finance Qtrs Gate; Gwarinpa/Gwarinpa Estate I (Federal Staff Clinic); Gwarinpa/Gwarinpa Estate II (Gishiri); Mbora/Citec Estate; Fountain Estate I; Citec Mbora Estate; Gwarinpa Estate; Model City Gate; Mab Global Estate; Queens Estate; Karsana Estate; Jabi Junior Sec Sch After Chida Hotel; Efab Estate - Kado Village/Kado Raya Ung; Dape; Dape Village; Tiv Settlement (Along Railway); Kuchigoro Vcg Sss Qtrs; Finance Qtrs Alfa Estate; Gwarimpa Estate I (Kado Bimko L. E. A Pri. Sch); Gwarimpa Estate II (Tipper Garage 3rd Avenue); Gwarimpa Estate II (Gishiri Village); Katampe Estate; Gishiri Estate; Festruit Estate
Municipal	Jiwa	Jiwa Tsoho / Kofar Gidan Sarki; Jiwa I/ Jiwa TV Viewing Centre; Jiwa II/ Jiwa Pri. School; Jiwa III/ G. S. S. Jiwa; Bassan Jiwa III/Bassan Jiwa Village Square; Tunga Madaki/ Tunga Madaki Pri. Sch.; Wukara/Wukara Village Centre; Wukara Dallatu Village Wukara; Hulumi/Hulumi Village Centre; Idu /Idu Village Primary School; Idu II /Idu Village Primary School; Idu III / Gidin Mangoro Masalachin Jumm'A; Idu IV / Gidin Mangoro Masalachin Jumma'A; Karmo Sabo I/ Karmo Pri. School; Karmo Saboii/ Karmo Pri. School; Karmo Sabo III/ Opp. Karmo Market; Karmo Sabo IV/ Behind Karmo Market; Karmo Sabo V/ Karmo Ungwar Koro; Karmo Sabo VI/ Karmo Ungwar Gwari; Karmo Tsoho / Karmo Tsoho; Takalafiya New Village; Transformer/Madalla Sabon Unguwa Village; Paipe Village; Zhida Village; Unguwar Shaho New Settlement; Kafuwa Village Extension
Municipal	Gui	Gui Pada/Gui Village; Toge/Toge Village; Sauka/Sauka Village; Gbessa/Gbessa Pri. Sch.; Gosa/Gosa Pri. School; Iddo Sarki/Iddo Sarki Pri. Sch.; Iddo Mazhi /Iddo Mazhi; Nuwarege/Nuwarege; Airport/G. S. S. Airport; T/Wakili Tungan Wakili Village; Bakwa New Resettlement Village; Iddo Sabo Village; Foot Royal Estate, Gosa; Kuyama New Resettlement Village; Dayisana New Village/Mield Fielder Estate; Airforce Base; Jedo Estate; Aco Estate; University Permanent Site; Barwa Village
Municipal	Orozo	Orozo/Orozo Pri. School; Ung. Sarki/Ung. Sarki Village Centre; Guguggu/Gugugug Pri. Sch.; Kurudu/Kurudu Pri. Sch.; Chori Bisa/Chori Bisa Village Centre; Azhata/Azhata Near E. C. W. A. Church; Kpegyi/Kpegyi Near E. C. W. A. Church; Gidan Mangoro/Gidan Mangoro Village Centre; Army Barracks Estate Kurudu I; Army Barracks Estate Kurudu II; Army Barracks Estate Kurudu III; Unguwar Hausawa; Munafe Kwai New Resettlement Village; Army Barracks Kurudu; Anguwar Chakuwa Village Resettlement; Madalla Resettlement Village; Gidan Ajiya Village Resettlement
Municipal	Gwagwa	Gwagwa/Primary School Galadima; Gwagwa II/Civic Centre; Gwagwa III/Primary School; Gwagwa IV/Primary School; Gwagwa V / Opp. Gwagwa Market; Tasha/Tasha Village; Karsana/Karsana Village; Kaba/Kaba Village; Kigini/Kigini Village; Saburi/Saburi Village; Filling Dabo/Filling Dabo Village; Zauda Village I; Zauda Village II; Bagusa/Bagusa Village; Ung. Maiyaki Ibrahim After Brigade; Liberty Area By Liberty Hotel; Gwagwa 6 / Along Gwagwa Jiwa Rd.; Gwagwa 7 / Gwagwa Before Bridge; Gwagwa III/ By Police Barracks; Gwagwa/Angwan Cemetery; Gwagwa/Health Centre; Karsana Extension; Dabon Fulani; Ung Fulani Dei Dei
