= Ladi Kwali =

Nigerian potter (c. 1925–1984)

OON NNOM MBE Ladi Kwali
- Ladi Kwali
- Born: Ladi Kwali; 1925; Kwali, Northern Region, colonial Nigeria
- Died: 12 August 1984 (aged 58–59)
- Occupation: potter

Ladi Dosei Kwali, OON NNOM, MBE (c. 1925 – 12 August 1984) was a Nigerian potter, ceramicist and educator.

Ladi Kwali was born in the village of Kwali in the Gwari region of Northern Nigeria, where pottery was an indigenous occupation among women. She learned pottery as a child through her aunt, using the traditional method of coiling. She made large pots for use as water jars, cooking pots, bowls, and flasks from coils of clay, beaten from the inside with a flat wooden paddle. They were decorated with incised geometric and stylized figurative patterns, including scorpions, lizards, crocodiles, chameleons, snakes, birds, and fish.

Her pots were noted for their beauty of form and decoration, and she was recognized regionally as a gifted and eminent potter. Several were acquired by the emir of Abuja, Alhaji Suleiman Barau, in whose home they were seen by Michael Cardew in 1950.

== Early life ==
Miss Kwali was born in the small village of Kwali, present Kwali Area Council of the Federal Capital Territory, in 1925 (other historians indicate her date of birth is actually 1920). She grew up in a family that kept up with the folkloric female tradition of pottery making. Mallam Mekaniki Kyebese, Ladi Kwali's younger brother, stated; “even in the early years of pottery making, Ladi Kwali excelled in the crafts and her wares were often sold even before they were taken to the markets”.

During her first professional years, the traditional cultural environment moved her to produce pottery pieces that were influenced by the Gbagyi tradition and accentuated with personal idioms. Her approach to clay was echoed by mathematical undertones, made visible by the continuous display of symmetry.

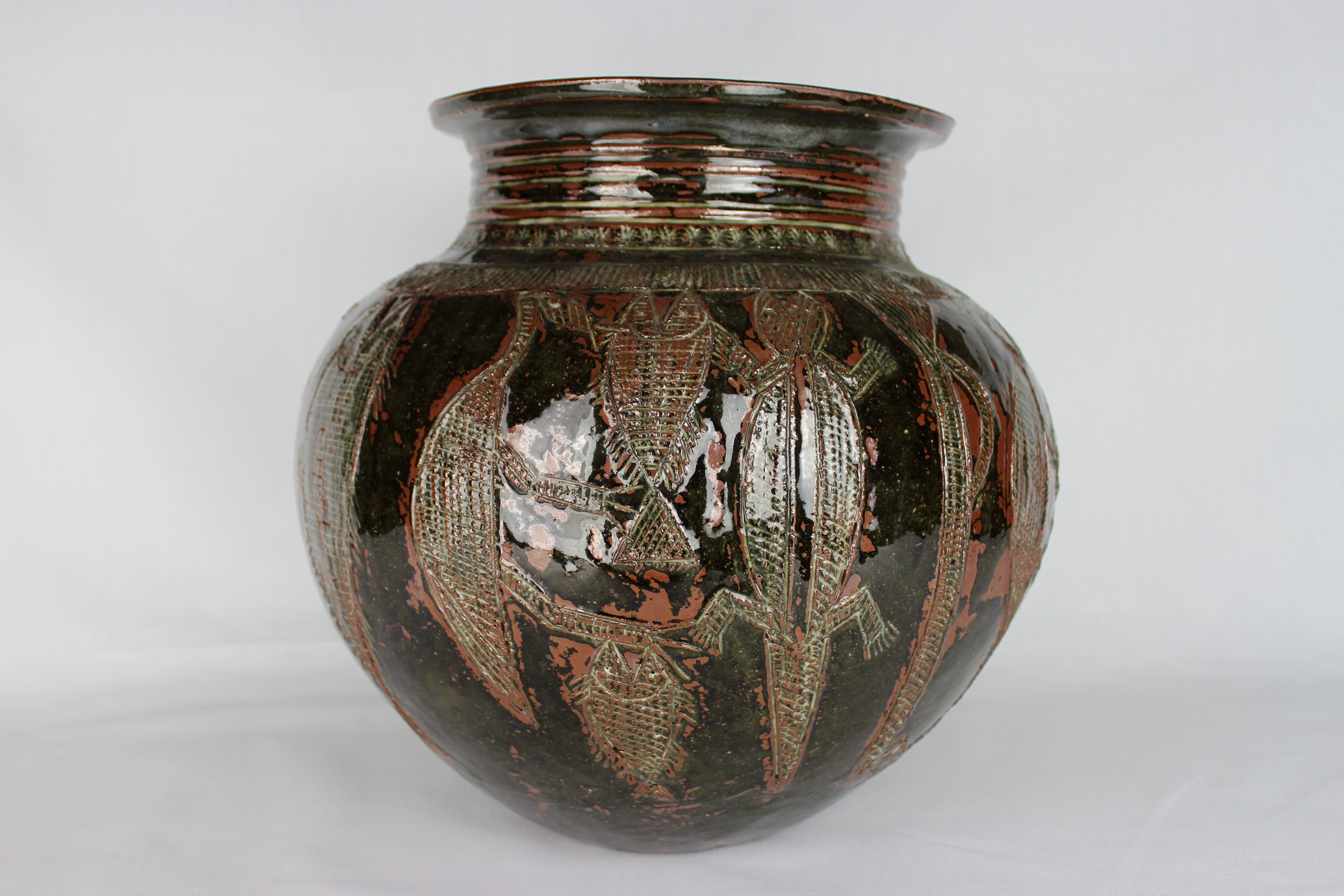
Hand-built pot by Ladi Kwali with incised figures; W.A. Ismay Studio Ceramics Collection, York Art Gallery

== Career ==
Michael Cardew, who was appointed to the post of Pottery Officer in the Department of Commerce and Industry in the colonial Nigerian Government in 1951, established the Pottery Training Centre in Suleja (then called "Abuja") in April 1952. In 1954, Ladi Kwali joined the Abuja Pottery as its first female potter. There, she learned wheel throwing, glazing, kiln firing, production of saggars, and the use of slip, eventually assuming the role of instructor. She made bowls with sgraffito decoration, which involved dipping vessels in red or white slip and then scratching the decoration through the slip to the underlying body, using a porcupine quill.

By the time Cardew left his post in 1965, the Centre had attracted four additional women from Gwari: Halima Audu, Lami Toto, Assibi Iddo, and Kande Ushafa. These women worked together in one of the workshops, which they called Dakin Gwari (the Gwari room), to hand-build large water pots.

=== Design style ===
They would shape and scrape the insides of the pots with the shell of a snail, a hard seed pod or a calabash rind. Then, they adapted their traditional incised designs, by inlaying them with a white kaolin and feldspar slip, which would gravitate into the depressed decorations. After these pots were fired with a translucent celadon glaze, the areas with slip would appear pale green in contrast with the dark green or iron red stoneware body of the vessels. Because the hand-built, ornately decorated pots were glazed and fired in a high-temperature kiln, they represent an interesting hybrid of traditional Gwari and western studio pottery. The quintessential Ladi Kwali pot was coiled in a stoneware clay, decorated with lizard patterns and fired with a dark shiny glaze. For Western viewers and collectors, the dark glaze was a metaphor for the pots' "Africanness."

She would impress patterns on top of the figures by rolling small roulettes of twisted string or notched wood over the surface of the clay, sometimes as horizontal banding and sometimes in vertical panels. The wooden roulettes consisted of small cylinders of hard wood, two or three inches long and a half-inch in diameter, notched with straight, oblique, or parallel patterns. The earthenware vessels and decorative techniques have been dated back to the Neolithic period. Following the region's traditional method, they were fired in a bonfire of dry vegetation.

=== Exhibitions ===
From her cultural tradition, where women were primarily responsible for pottery, Ladi Kwali's ceramics became "art objects". Ladi Kwali's pots were featured in international exhibitions of Abuja pottery in 1958, 1959, and 1962, organised by Cardew. In 1961, Kwali gave demonstrations at the Royal College, Farnham, and Wenford Bridge in Great Britain. She also gave demonstrations in France and Germany over this period. In 1972, she toured America with Cardew. Her work was shown to great acclaim in London at the Berkeley Galleries. The Abuja Pottery was renamed the Ladi Kwali Pottery in the early 1980s.

== Legacy ==
In 1954, Kwali's pots were featured in the International exhibition of Abuja pottery organized by Michael Cardew.

Kwali was awarded an MBE (Member of the Order of the British Empire) in 1963.

In 1977, she was awarded an honorary doctoral degree from Ahmadu Bello University in Zaria.

In 1980, the Nigerian Government conferred on her the Nigerian National Order of Merit Award (NNOM), the highest national honor for academic achievement. She was made an Officer of the Order of the Niger (OON) in 1981.

Her picture appears on the back of the Nigerian 20 Naira banknote.

In Abuja, a major street, Ladi Kwali Road, and the Ladi Kwali Convention Center at the Sheraton Hotel are named for her.

Her works are held in collections all around the world, such as Smithsonian National Museum of African Art, USA, Victoria and Albert Museum, and Aberystwyth University Ceramics Gallery, UK.

In 2022, a significant exhibition titled Body Vessel Clay: Black Women, Ceramics & Contemporary Art, curated and conceived by Dr Jareh Das, was held at Two Temple Place and the York Art Gallery. This exhibition highlighted Ladi Kwali and her influence on a generation of Black female artists, using Kwali as a starting point to explore 70 years of ceramics by Black women artists. In 2025, Body Vessel Clay made its US debut at the Ford Foundation Gallery.

The Google Doodle for 16 March 2022 was in honor of Kwali.
