= School for the Gifted (Gwagwalada) =

Secondary school in Abuja, Nigeria

Coordinates: 8.945324°N 7.06609°E

School for the Gifted, Gwagwalada
- Gwagwalada; Abuja, Federal Capital Territory; Nigeria

Information
- Other name: SFG
- Motto: Knowledge for Excellence
- Established: 1993; 33 years ago
- Colors: Green and White

School For The Gifted is a secondary school located in Gwagwalada, Abuja, Nigeria.

It was formerly known as Government Gifted Secondary School. The school was established in 1993 but commenced its operation in 1994 to provide for the educational needs of gifted and intelligent students in the Federal Capital Territory

As of 2019 it is headed by its 7th principal Onimago Ibrahim Saheed.

It comprises Science, Humanities and Business classes for Senior Secondary Education with a motto of "Knowledge for Excellence".

In the year 2020, there was only one graduating business student. He started the journey alone from SS1.
