= Orozo =

Satellite town in Abuja, Nigeria

Orozo is a satellite town within the Abuja Municipal Area Council (AMAC). Its geographical coordinate is 8°54'0"N,7°34'22" E It is located along Nyanya Karshi expressway. It is 14 km drive from Nyanya and 7 km drive to karshi. It is 19 km to Abuja city centre. Orozo native inhabitants are the Gbagyi tribe and the major religion is Christianity. Orozo has a regular market known by the same name that trades daily and holds its major trading Tuesdays.

== Schools ==
Federal Science and Technical College, Orozo.
