= Gwagwalada =

Coordinates: 8.939167°N 7.075833°E

- City and local government area
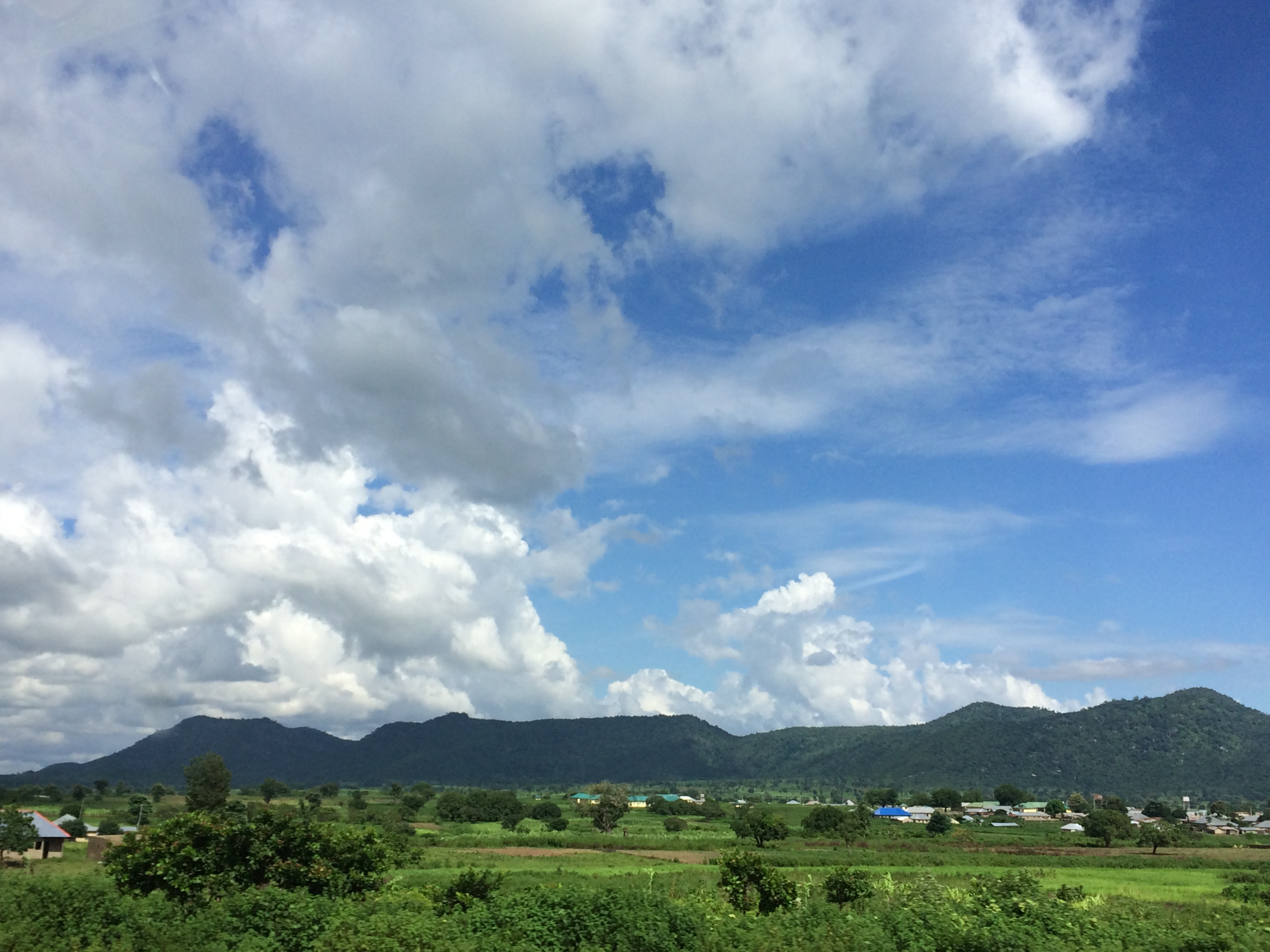
- Interactive map of Gwagwalada
- Location in Nigeria
- Country: Nigeria
- Territory: Federal Capital Territory

Government
  - Executive chairman: Alhaji Abubakar Jibrin Giri

Area
  - Total: 1,036 km^{2} (400 sq mi)

Population (2022 est)
  - Total: 346,000
  - Density: 334/km^{2} (865/sq mi)
- Time zone: UTC+1 (WAT)
- 6-digit postal code prefix: 902101
- Area code: NG.AB.GW
- Website: http://www.fctacss.org.ng/index.php/area-councils/gwagwalada-area-council

Gwagwalada is a city and local government area in the Federal Capital Territory in Nigeria. Gwagwalada serves as the traditional headquarters of the Bassa people in FCT, with their traditional leader known as the Agụma, currently held by HRH Alhaji Muhammadu Magaji.

Gwagwalada has an area of 1,043 km^{2} and a population of 157,770 at the 2006 census. It is projected to have a 6.26% growth between 2020 and 2025, the largest increase on the African continent.

== History ==
Before the creation of Federal Capital Territory, Gwagwalada was under the Kwali District of the former Abuja emirate now Suleja emirate. Gwagwalada was created on 15 October 1984. Its official population figure of 158,618 people at the 2006 census. The relocation of the seat of government from Lagos to Abuja in 1992 and the recent demolition of illegal structures within the Federal City Center brought a massive influx of people into the area being one of the fastest growing urban centers in the Federal Capital Territory. The population of the area has grown to over 1,000,000 people. Gwagwalada is one of the six local government areas of the Federal Capital Territory of Nigeria, together with Abuja Municipal (AMAC), Abaji, Kuje, Bwari, and Kwali; the Federal Capital Territory also includes the city of Abuja. Gwagwalada has an area of 1069.589 km^{2}.

Gwagwalada is also the title of a song by Nigerian musician Kizz Daniel released in 2023.

== Administrative structure ==
Gwagwalada is made of a single district and ten wards. It is administered by an Executive Chairman elected through adult suffrage. The Council is composed of ten elected councilors representing the ten wards of the Council, namely: Zuba, Ibwa, Dobi Kutunku, Tunga Maje, Gwako, Paikonkore, Ikwa, Quarters and Central.

The postal code of the area is 902101.

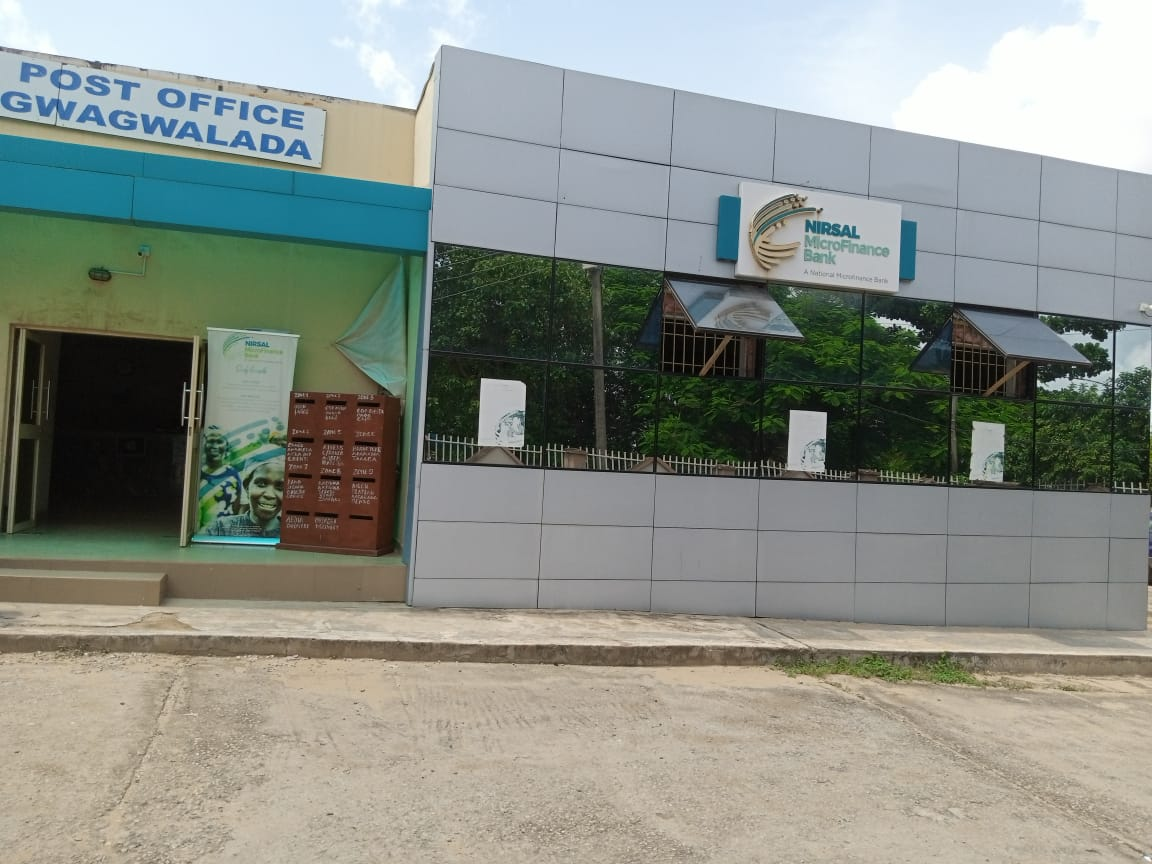
Gwagwalada Post Office, Gwagwalada- FCT Abuja

The Chairman of the Gwagwalada is Alhaji Abubakar Jibrin Giri Gwagwalada is where the mini campus of the University of Abuja is located. School For The Gifted is also located in the area.

== Climate ==
The rainy season in Gwagwalada Local Government Area is oppressive and cloudy, while the dry season is humid and partially cloudy. The area has year-round heat. The average annual temperature fluctuates between 63 °F and 95 °F; it is rarely lower or higher than 57 °F or 102 °F. Due in part to the oppressive and overcast wet season as well as the humid and partially cloudy dry season, the temperature rarely varies.

=== Average Temperature ===
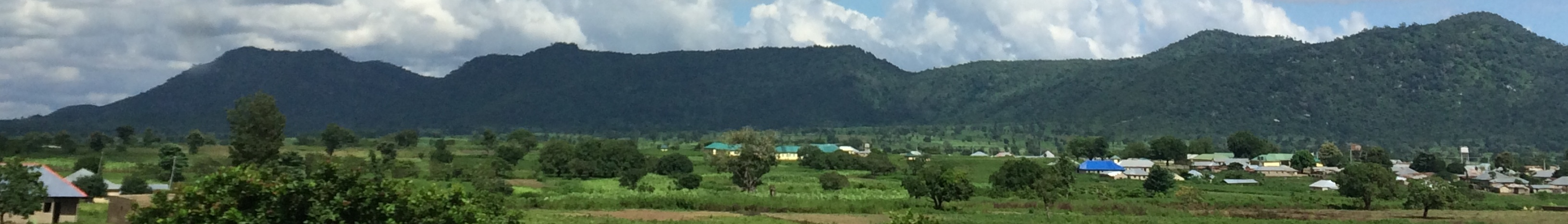
Gwagwalada banner Giri mountain

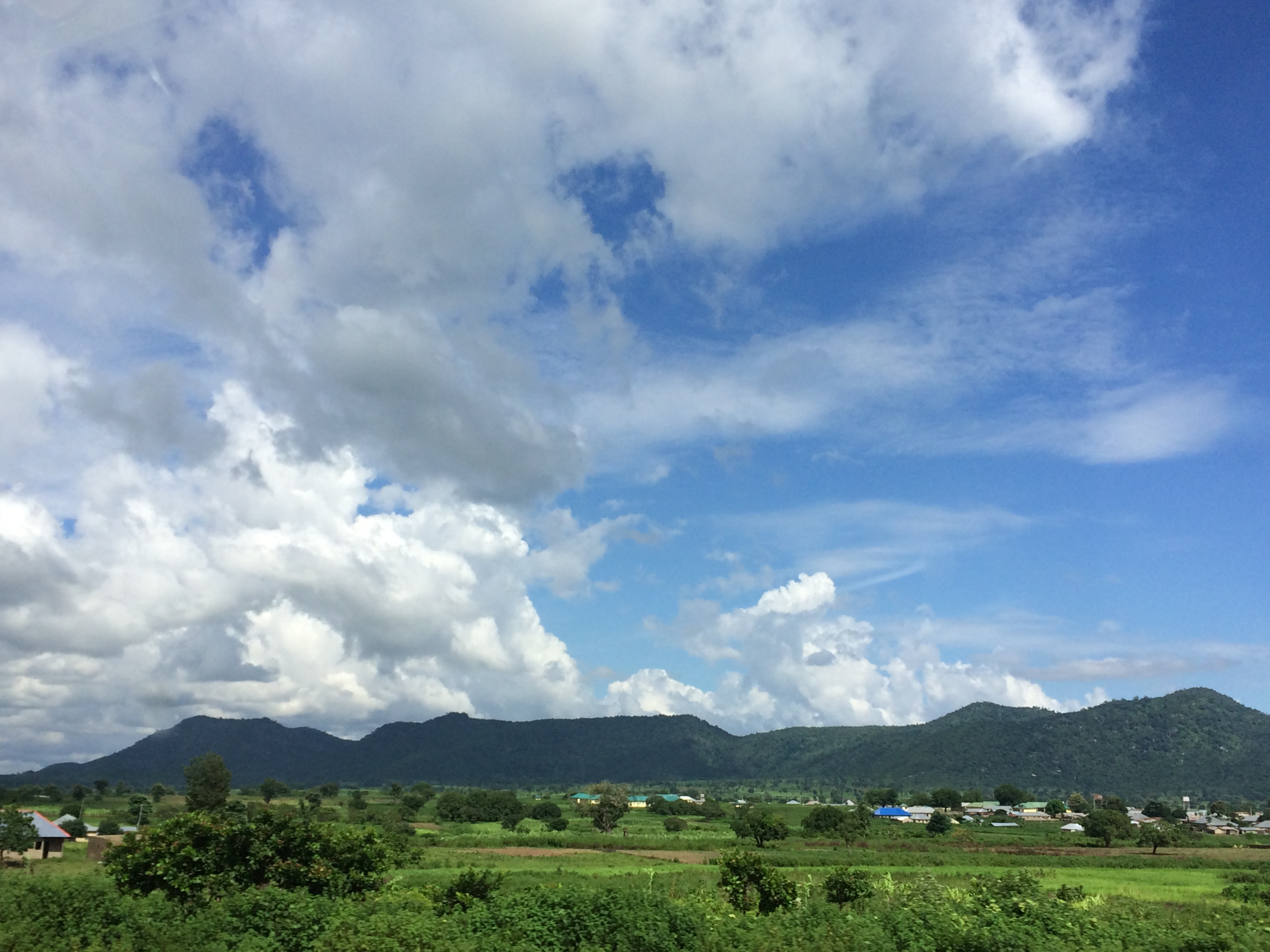
Giri mountain

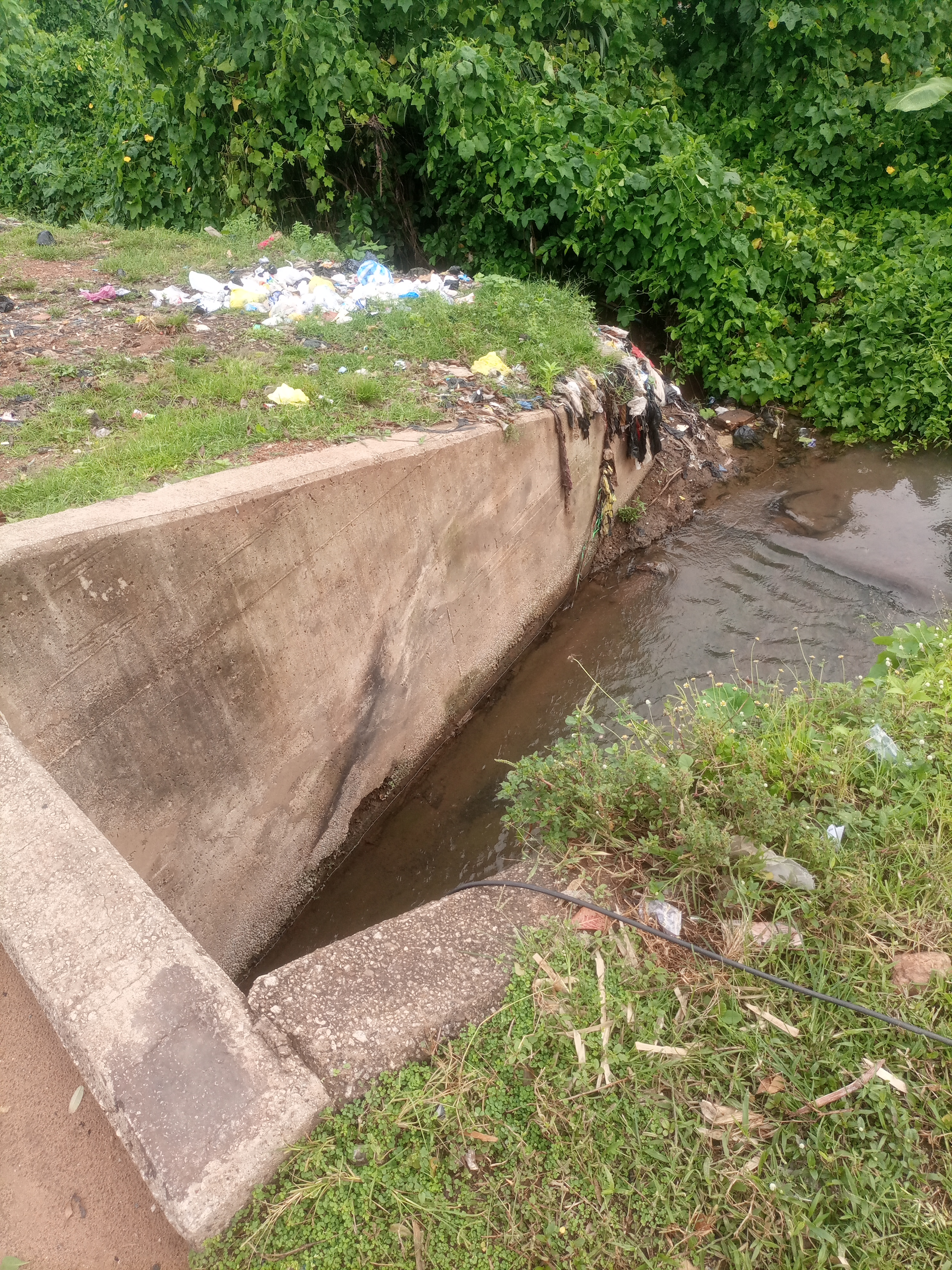
Drainage system around Gwagwalada UATH road blocked by refuse

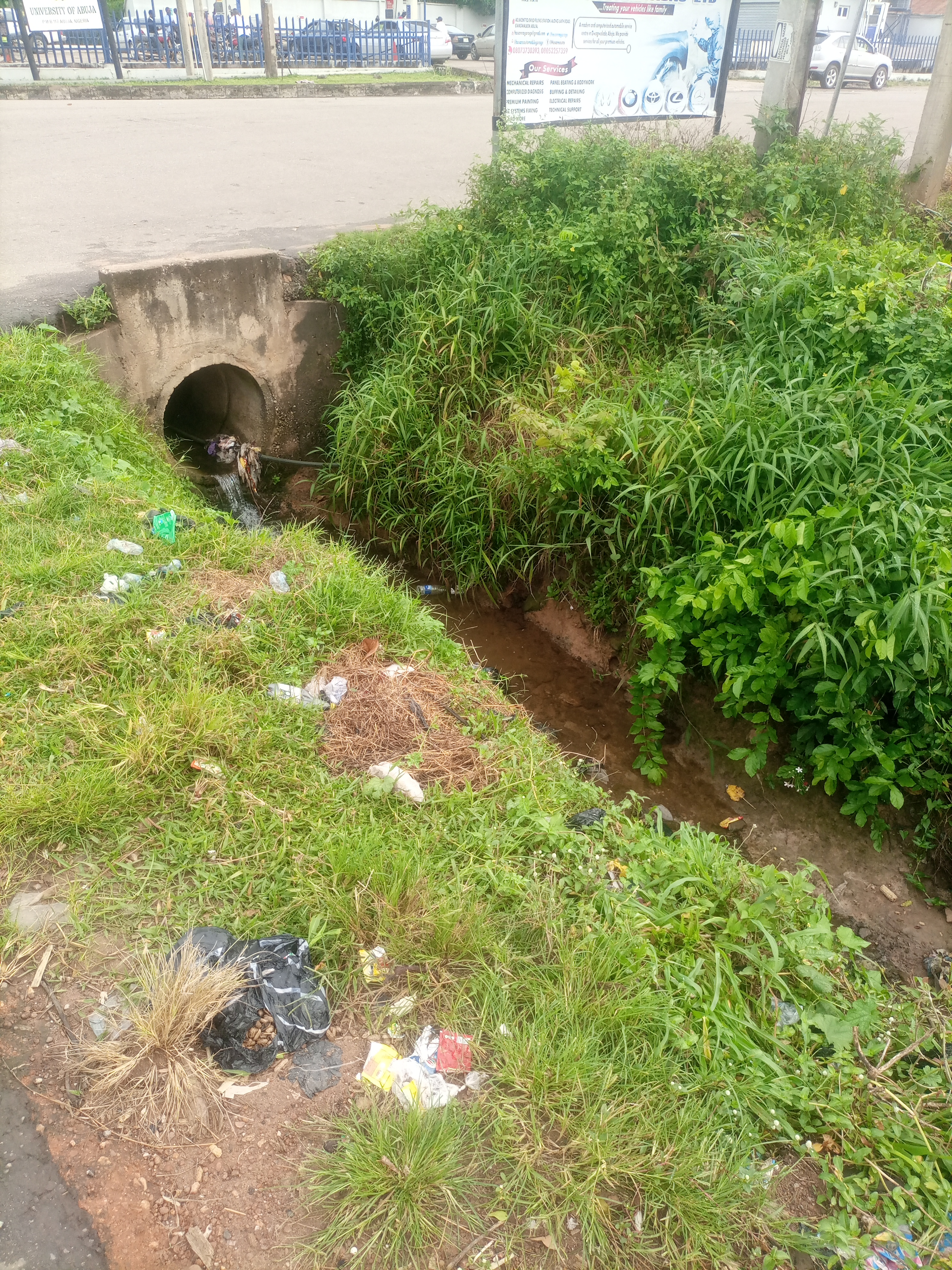
Drainage leading to the canal exposed to refuse dump at Gwagwalade Local Government Area

The average daily maximum temperature during the 2.7-month hot season, which runs from January 25 to April 14, is above 92 °F. With an average high temperature of 94 °F and low temperature of 73 °F, March is the hottest month of the year in Gwagwalada. The average daily high temperature during the 3.3-month cool season, which runs from June 24 to October 1, is below 85 °F. December is the coldest month of the year in Gwagwalada, with an average high temperature of 90 °F and low temperature of 64 °F.
