= Kwali, Nigeria =

Local Government Area in Federal Capital Territory, Nigeria

Kwali
- City and local government area
- Interactive map of Kwali
- Country: Nigeria
- Territory: Federal Capital Territory

Area
  - Total: 1,241 km^{2} (479 sq mi)

Population (2022 est)
  - Total: 188,000
  - Density: 151/km^{2} (392/sq mi)
- Time zone: UTC+1 (WAT)

Kwali is a big town and local government area in the Federal Capital Territory in Nigeria.

It has an area of 1,206 km^{2} and a population of 85,837 at the 2006 census. Kwali contains 9 districts and electoral wards.

The postal code of the area is 904105.

== History ==
Kwali was created on October 1, 1996 by the military administration of General Sani Abacha.

== Socio-cultural life ==
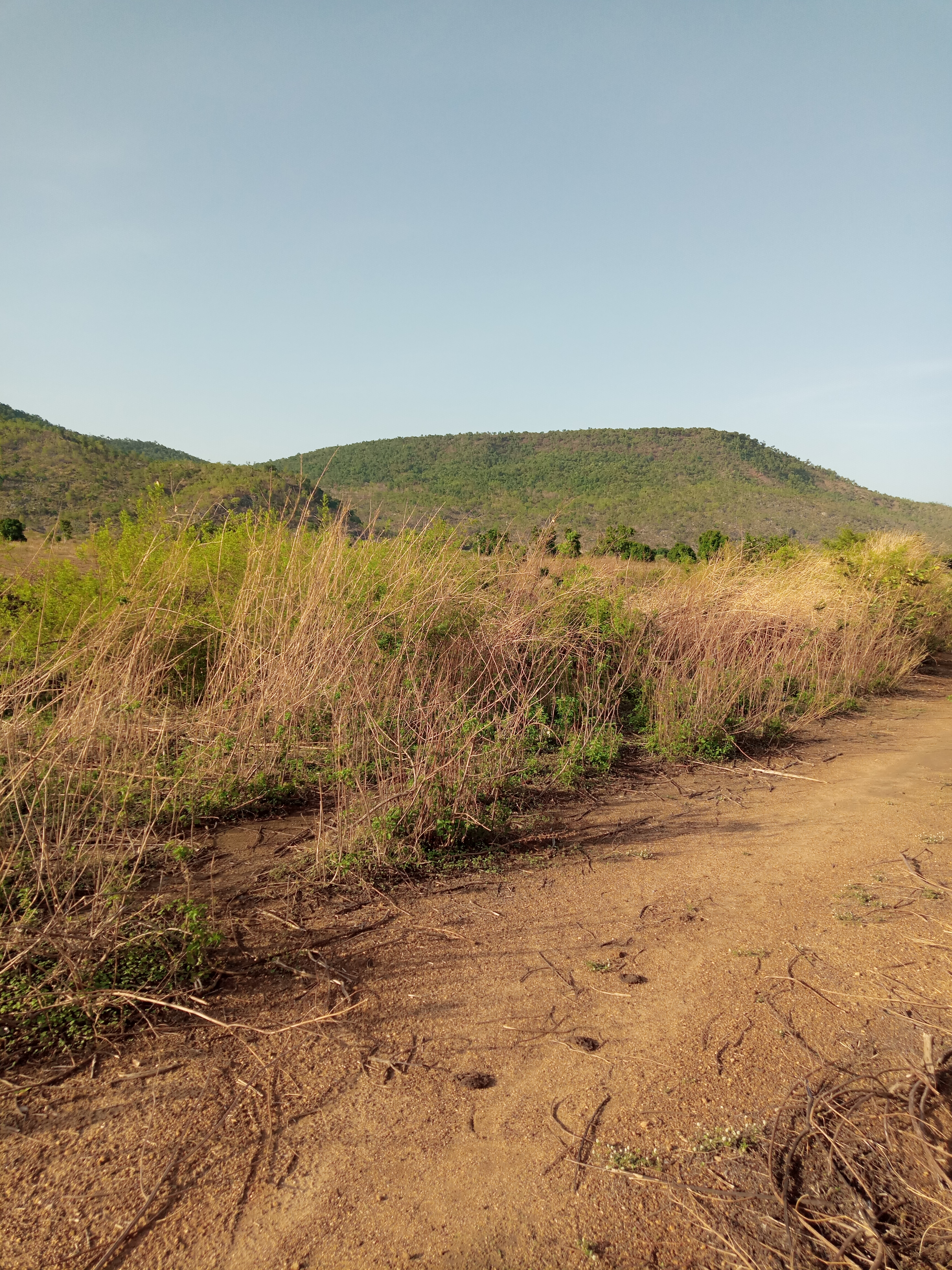
Kwali farm, Abuja Nigeria

One profession that the people of Kwali Local Government Area are famous for is pottery. Indeed, it is the country home of the world-famous potter, Dr. Ladi Kwali whose image currently adorns the 20 naira bill. Another is cloth making. But today, other professions such as farming, hunting and trading are also practiced by the inhabitants of Kwali Area Council.

== Constitution ==
Like other area councils in Nigeria, Kwali is headed by an elected chairman and is sub-divided into wards. The 10 wards that make up Kwali Area Council are Ashara, Dafa, Gumbo, Kilankwa, Kundu, Kwali, Pai, Wako, Yangoji and Yebu. Each Ward is headed by a councillor. But unlike a typical area council in Nigeria, Kwali has a different mode of sub-division into districts headed by district heads.

== Climate ==
In Kwali, the year-round heat is accompanied by an uncomfortable, cloudy rainy season and a humid, partially cloudy dry season. The average annual temperature fluctuates between 17 °C (63 °F) and 34 °C (93 °F); it is rarely lower or higher than 14 °C (57 °F) or 38 °C (101 °F). With an average yearly temperature of 31.42 °C (88.56 °F), the Kwali district has a tropical wet and dry climate, which is 1.96% warmer than the national average for Nigeria.

=== Average Temperature ===
With an average daily high temperature of 33 °C (92 °F), the hot season spans 2.7 months, from January 24 to April 15. At an average high temperature of 33 °C (92 °F) and low temperature of 24 °C (76 °F), April is the hottest month of the year in Kwali. With an average daily maximum temperature below 29 °C (85 °F), the cool season spans 3.3 months, from June 24 to October 2. With an average low temperature of 18 °C (64 °F) and high temperature of 32 °C (90 °F), December is the coldest month of the year in Kwali.

== Important Monuments ==
Kwali Area Council plays host to a number of important monuments including Federal Government College National Mathematical Center Sheda Kwali, Sheda Science and technology complex, Nigeria Education Research and Development Center, National Fire Academy Sheda, Nigeria National Petroleum Corporation (NNPC) pump station Awawa and more.
