= Kuje =

- City and local government area
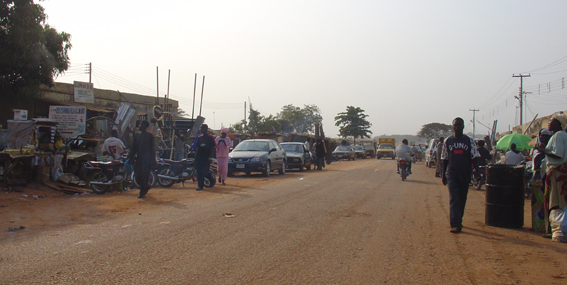
- Central Kuje
- Interactive map of Kuje
- Location within Nigeria
- Coordinates: 8°52′56″N 7°13′13″E
- Country: Nigeria
- Territory: Federal Capital Territory

Area
  - Total: 1,644 km^{2} (635 sq mi)

Population (2022 est)
  - Total: 212,100
  - Density: 129.0/km^{2} (334.1/sq mi)
- Time zone: UTC+1 (WAT)
- 3-digit postal code prefix: 905

Kuje is a city and local government area in the Federal Capital Territory in Nigeria. It consists of one district and nine electoral wards.

It has an area of 1,644 km^{2} and a population of 97,367 at the 2006 census.

The postal code of the area is 905.

== Attractions ==
Kuje is a busy market city with a range of roadside stores selling pharmaceuticals, provisions, building materials, ironmongery, tools, phone cards, music CDs. It is also home to several "independent" petrol stations. It is also known for its detention center and correctional facility called Kuje Prison, which gained notoriety in 2022 for an ISWAP attack which led to a prison break.

== Education ==
Kuje has several state and private schools including Government Secondary School, Kuje Science Primary School, the Capital Science Academy, DFGS Glorious Shining Star Academy and Nigeria-Ghana International College, Kingdom Heritage Model School, Glory and Praise Schools, New Hope Academy, Creative Brains Academy, Astute Monttesorri schools and Aflon Digital Academy. It is also home to a few tertiary institutions like Prime University, Philomath University, Illa College of Health Sciences and Technology among others.

== Market ==
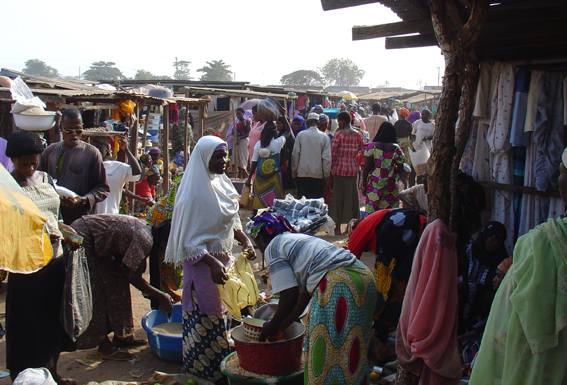
Kuje Market

In the centre of Kuje is a colourful market held every four days with stalls selling fruit, vegetables, very fresh meat, other provisions, household goods, fabric, shoes, clothing, smoked fish and posters displaying European footballers pictured alongside their houses, wives and cars. Farming is another important economic activity. The region grows crops such maize, potatoes, onions, and groundnuts. Making crafts and working with wood are two more significant economic activity that Kuje LGA citizens engage in. In addition, Kuje LGA is home to several government buildings, motels, and banks.

== Expansion ==
Kuje is seeing a rapid expansion in residential building because of its proximity to Abuja and because of the removal of informal settlements along the airport road. There is a network of well tarred roads serving zones of as yet unbuilt housing whilst the existing residential areas are linked by often impassable, potholed dirt roads.

== Geography ==
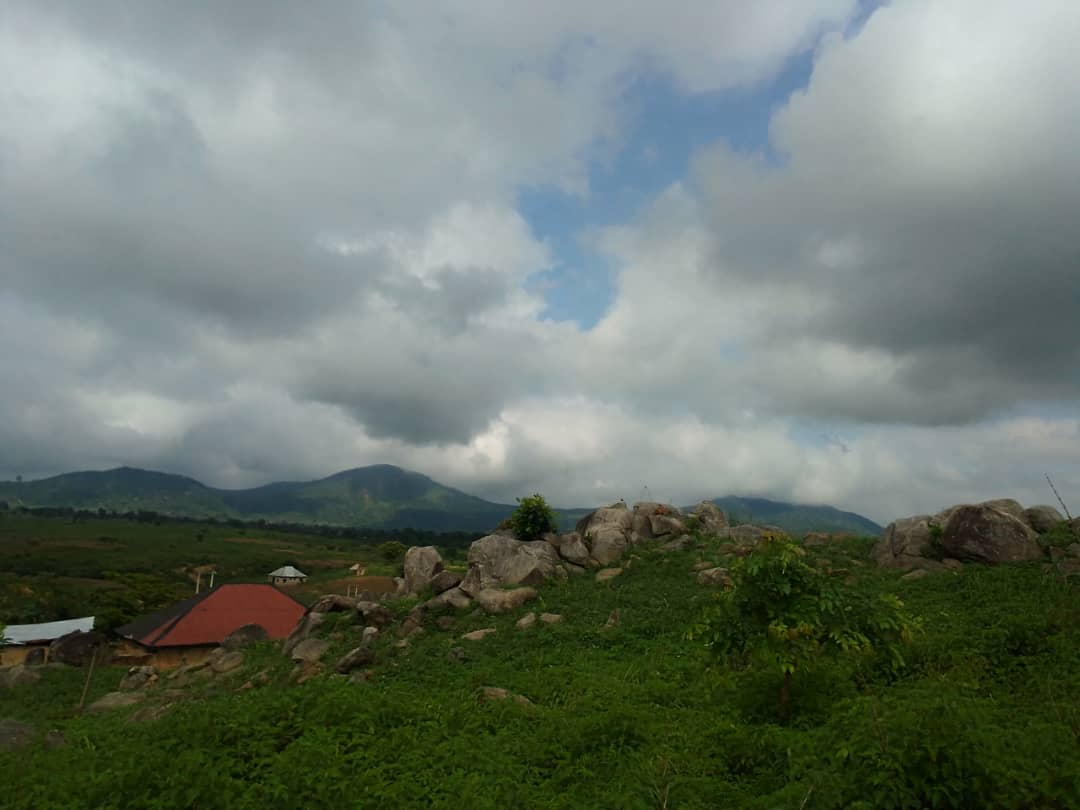
Topography of Lanto area in Kuje

Kuje LGA has an average temperature of 30 °C (86 °F) and a total area of 1,644 square kilometres or 635 square miles. The dry and rainy seasons are the two distinct seasons that the LGA encounters. In Kuje LGA, the annual precipitation total is estimated to be 1250 mm, with an average humidity of 41%.

=== Climate ===
The two main seasons in Kuje are the hot summer (June to October), with average highs below 29 °C (84 °F), and the chilly winter (October to December), with lows below 17 °C (63 °F).

=== Average Temperature ===
The average daily maximum temperature during the 2.6-month hot season, which runs from January 27 to April 14, is above 33 °C (92 °F). March is the hottest month in Kuje with an average high temperature of 34 °C (94 °F) and low temperature of 23 °C (73 °F). The average daily maximum temperature during the 3.4-month cool season, which runs from June 23 to October 4, is below 29 °C (84 °F). December is the coldest month in Kuje with an average high temperature of 32 °C (89 °F) and low temperature of 17 °C (63 °F).

== Gallery ==
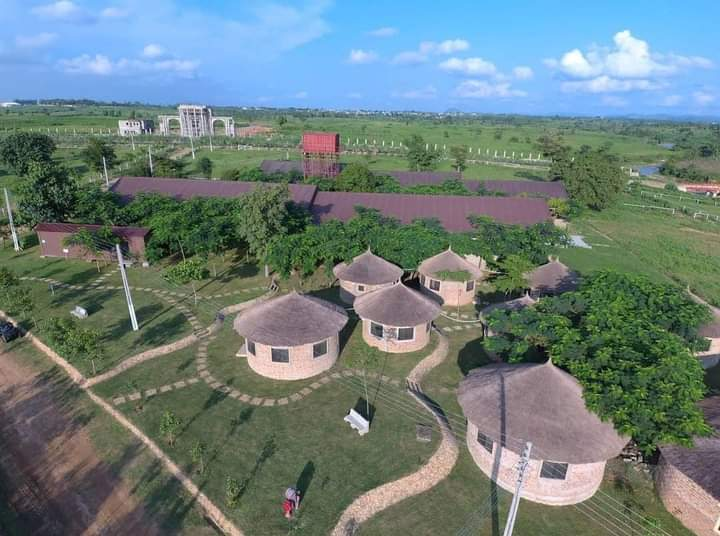
Almat Farms in Kuje

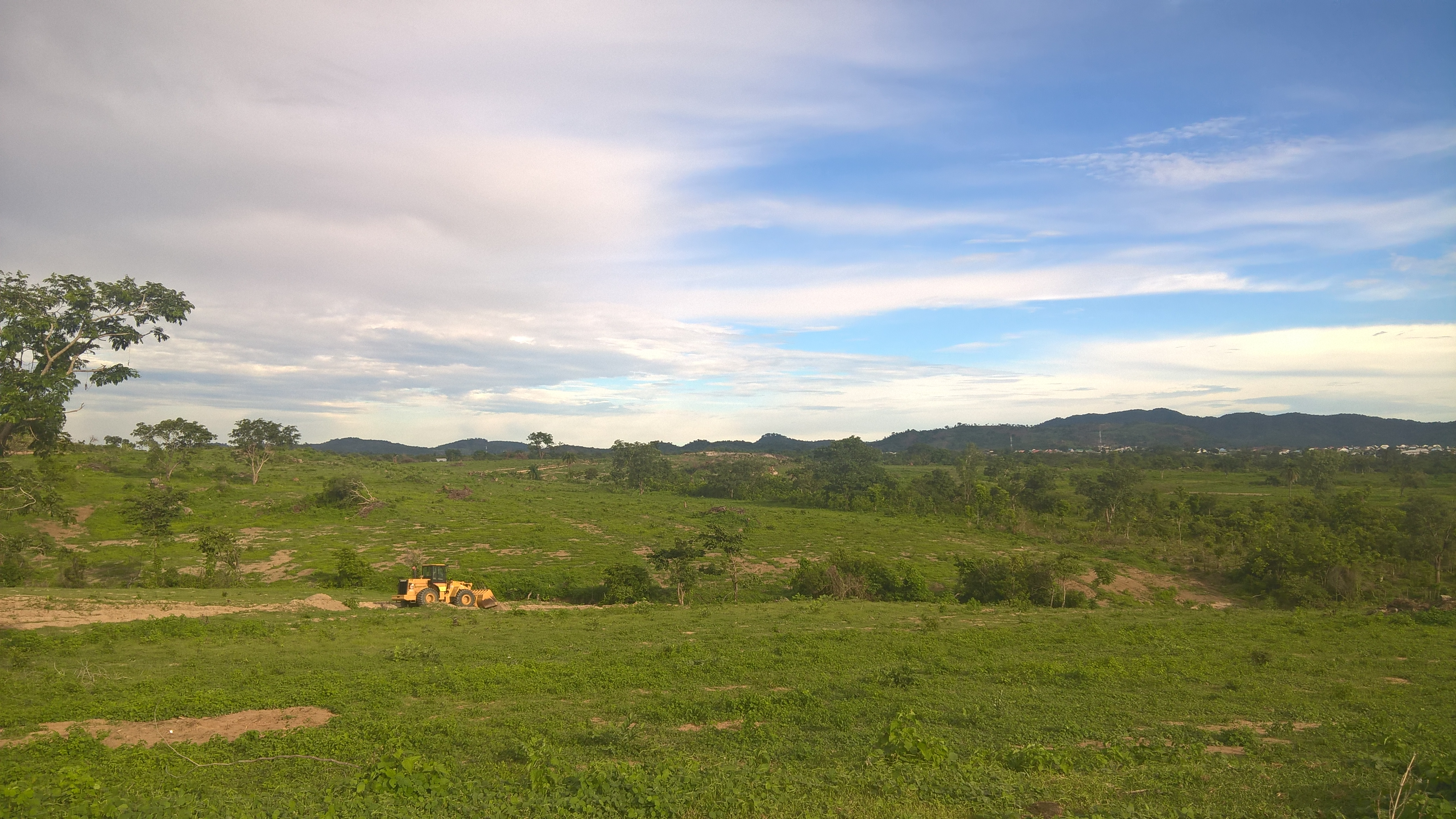
Expanse of vegetation in Kuje

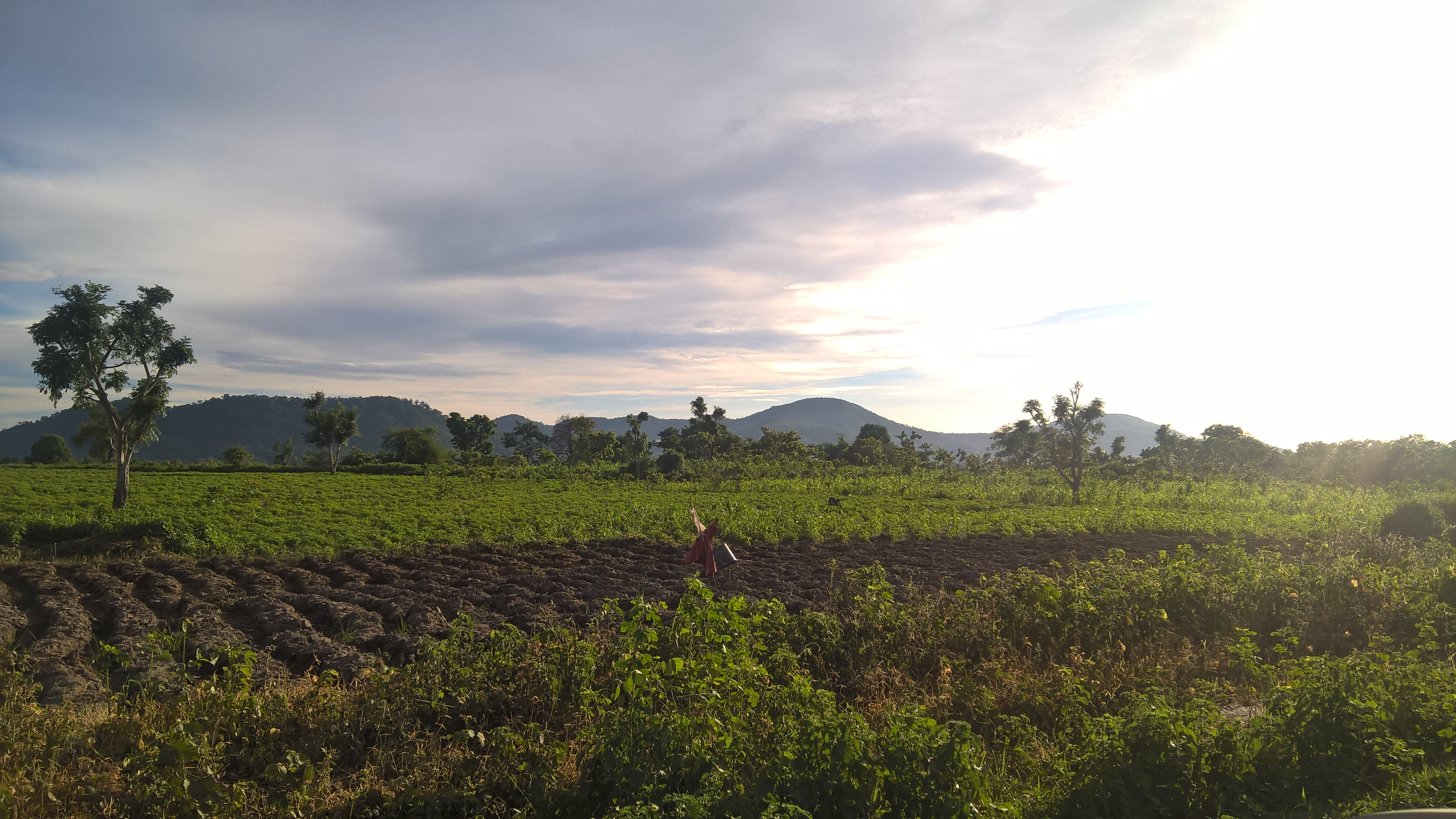
Farmland in Kuje, the Food Basket of the Federal Capital Territory, Nigeria

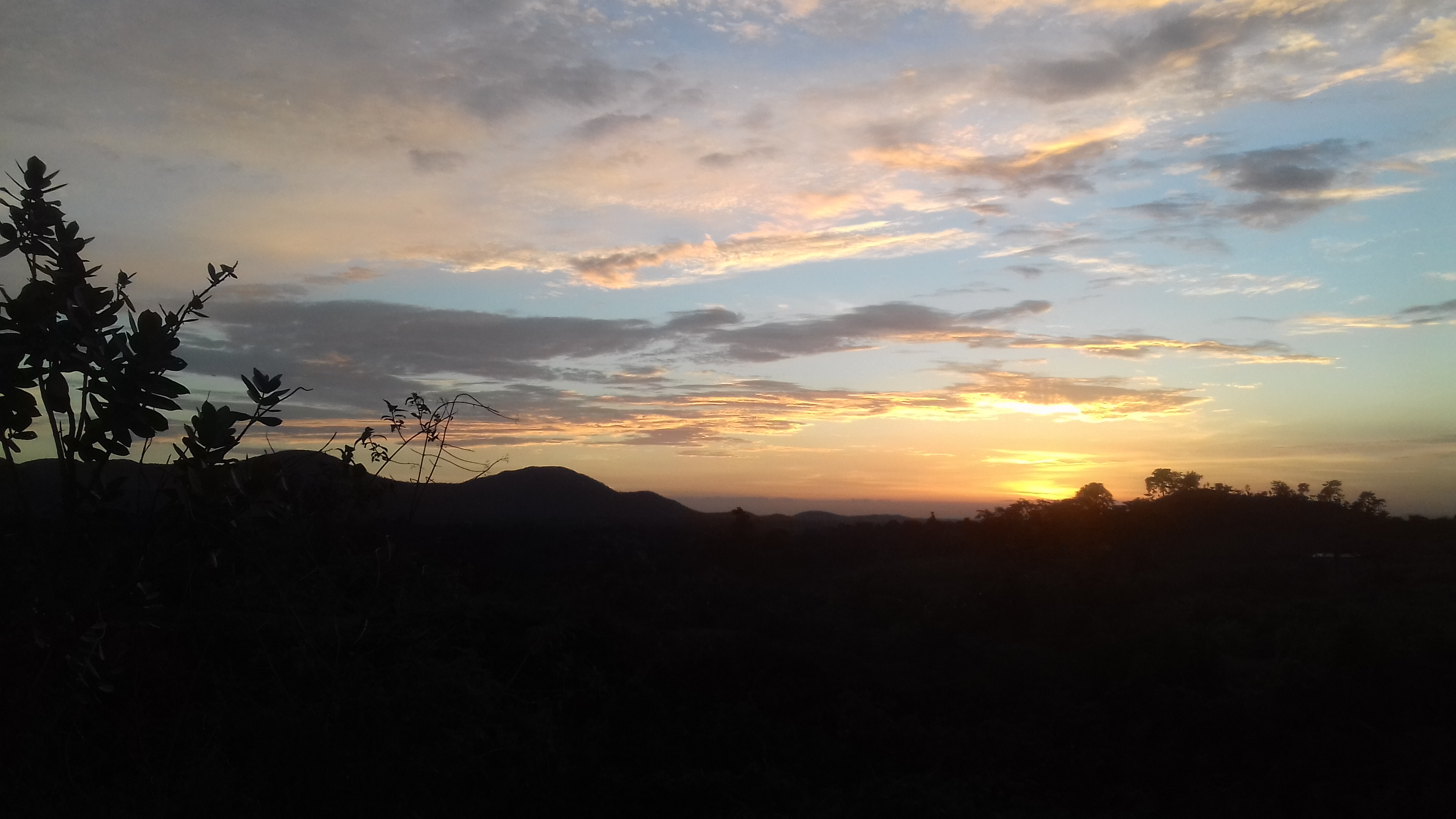
Silhouette of leaves and Hills, accompanied by beautiful clouds and a sweet tone of sunset, viewed from a road leading to 1000 Unit Estate Kuje Local Government Area

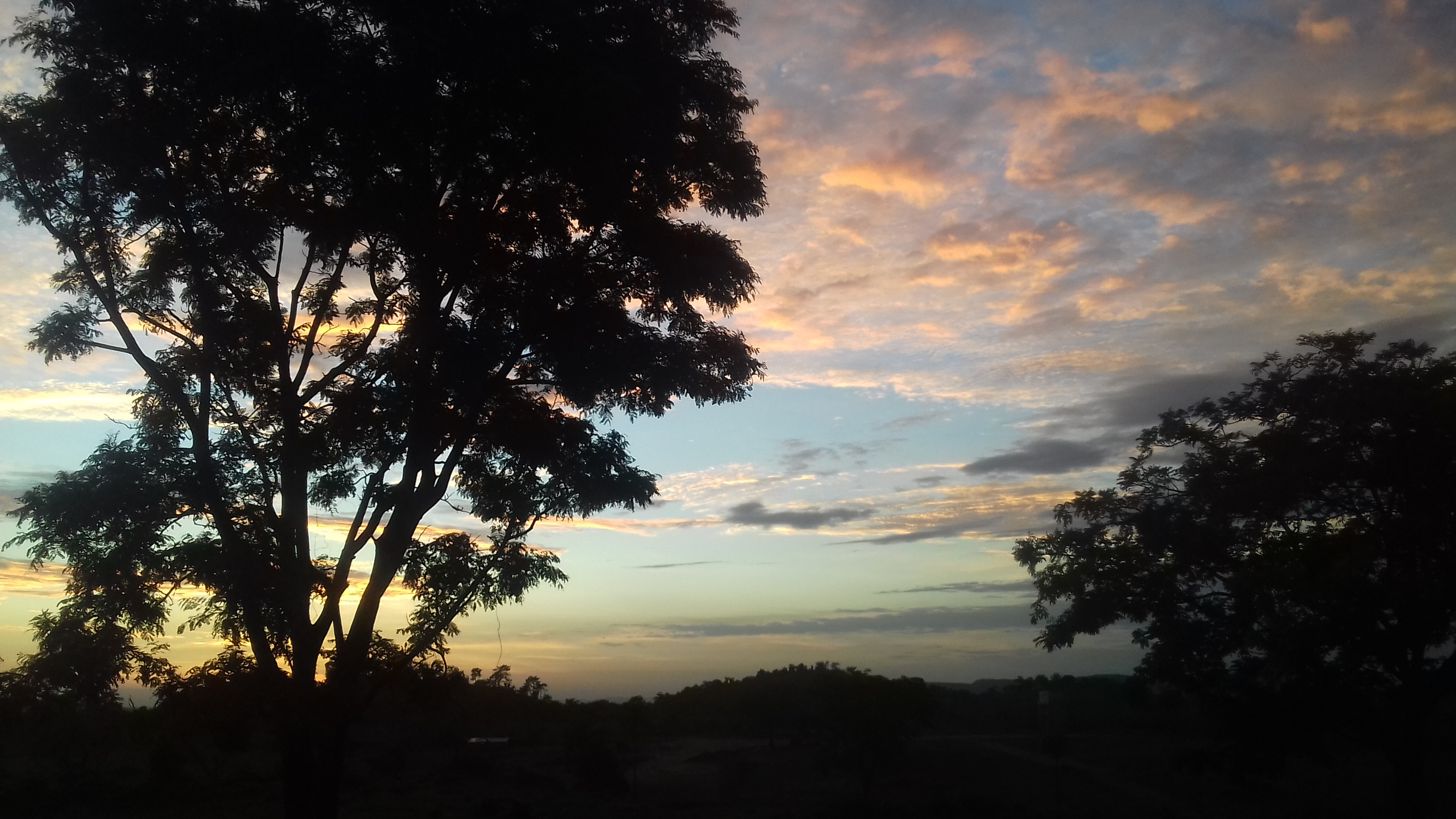
Trees, Clouds, and a Beautiful Sky, toned with vibrant colours from a setting Sun, Kuje

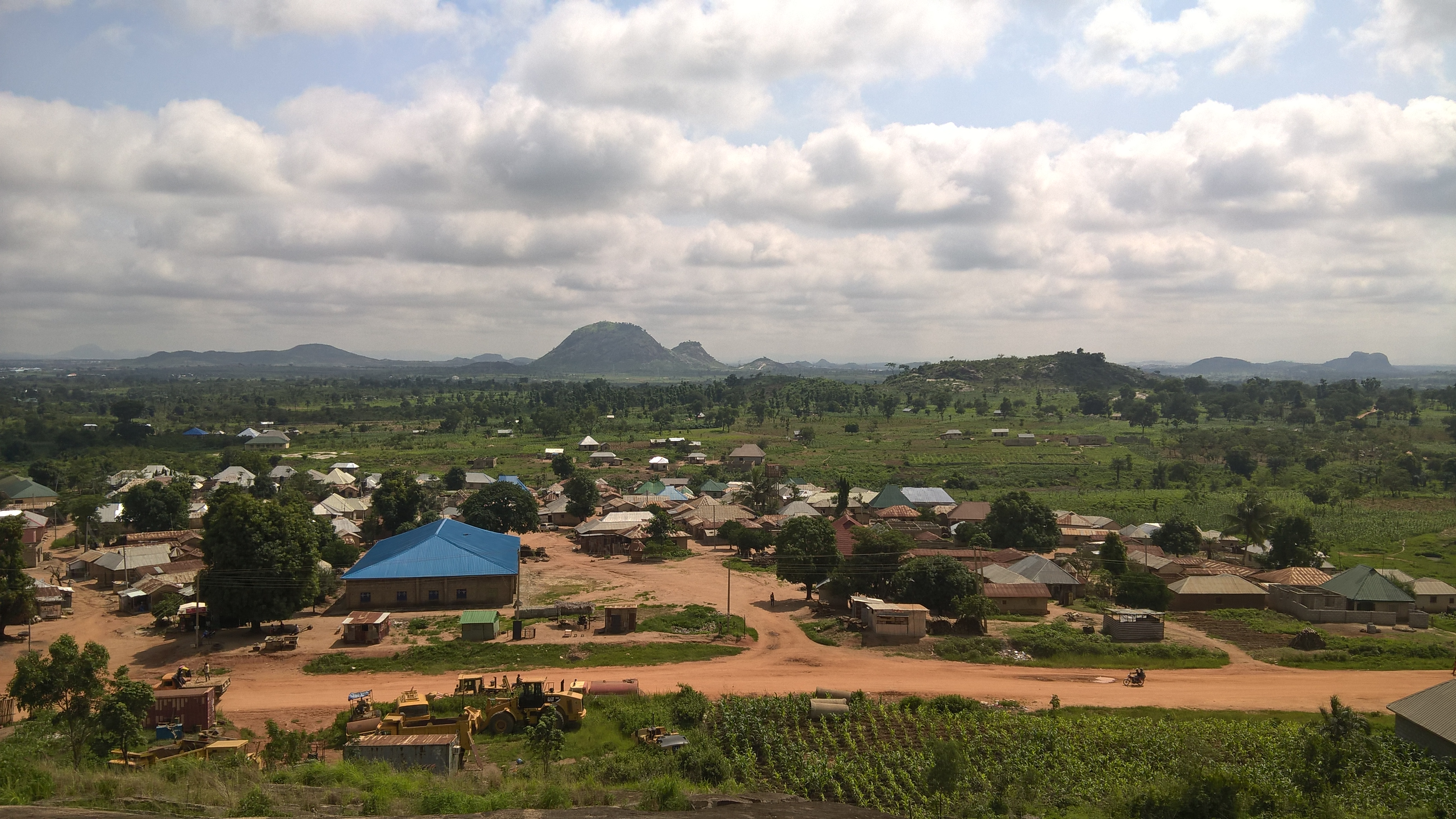
Bamishi Village, a rural area situated within the less urban regions around Kuje

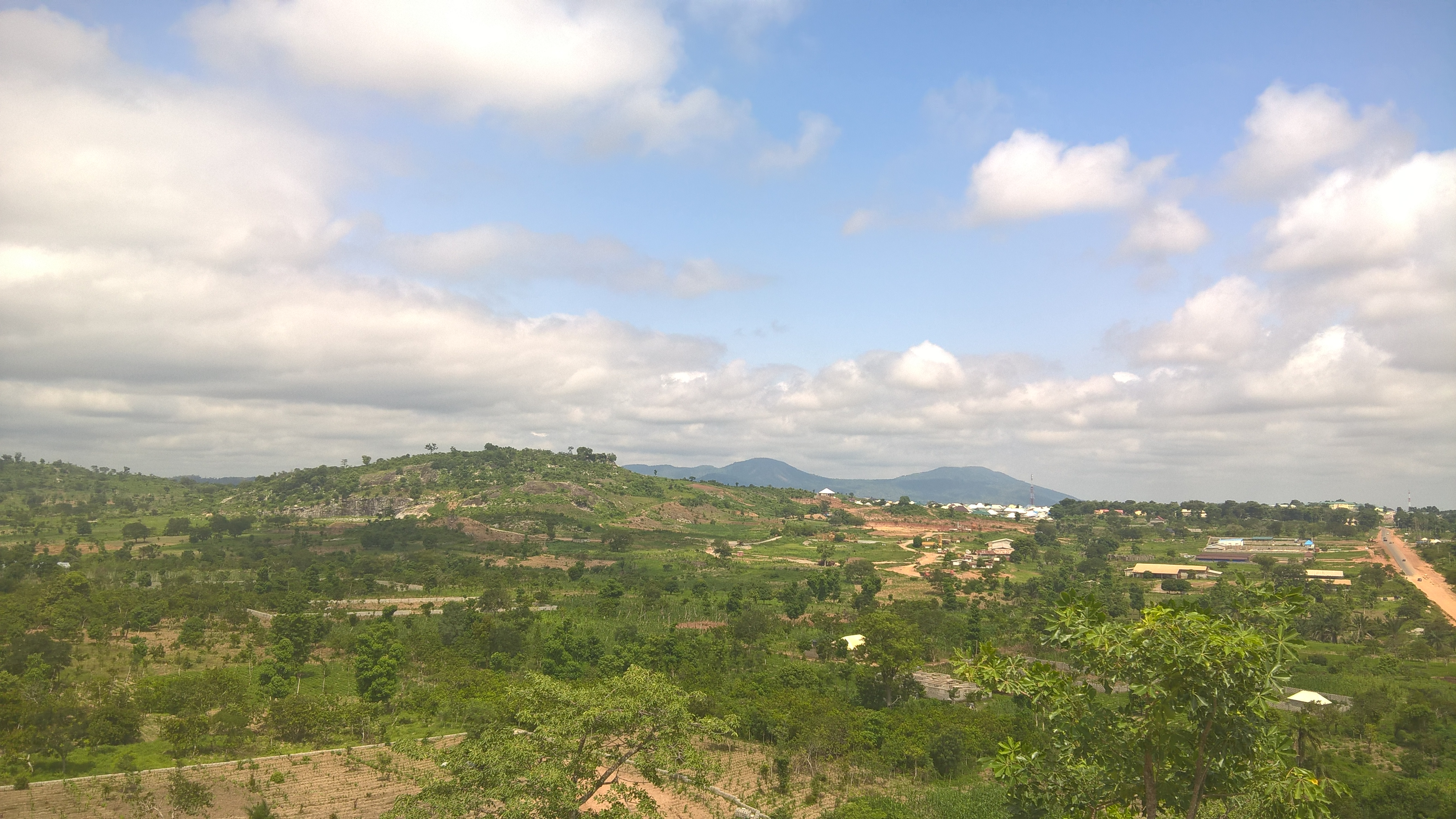
Bamishi Village
