= Abaji =

- Town and local government area
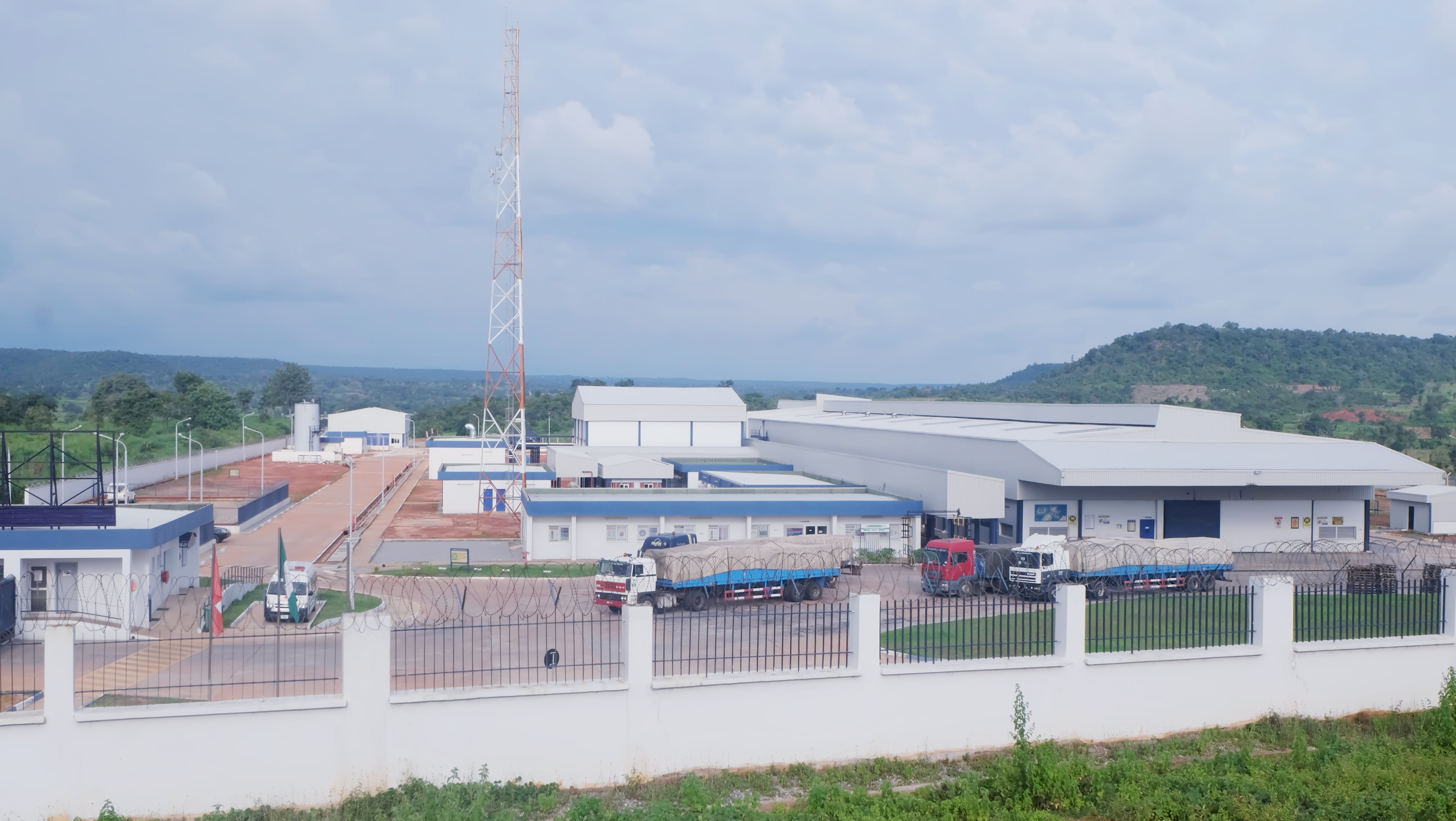
- Nestle plant Abaji LGA
- Interactive map of Abaji
- Location within Nigeria
- Coordinates: 8.475556°N 6.943333°E
- Country: Nigeria
- Territory: Federal Capital Territory

Area
  - Total: 948.1 km^{2} (366.1 sq mi)

Population (2022 est)
  - Total: 127,900
  - Density: 134.9/km^{2} (349.4/sq mi)
- Time zone: UTC+1 (WAT)
- Postal code: 905101

Abaji is a town and local government area in the Federal Capital Territory of Nigeria. The Abaji Area Council is the area council furthest from Abuja and occupies approximately 1,100 square kilometres. Created in 1986, the council has a population of over 46,600 inhabitants according to a 2006 national census. As a gateway to the Federal Capital Territory (FCT), Abaji is a fast-growing area. There is a notable influx of arrivals, many moving in search of new means of livelihood.

The council includes the land inhabited by the Bassa people, and Egbura even though other tribes (Ebiras, Yorubas, Igbos, and Nupes etc.) can be found in small proportions all over the Area council. The indigenous people are Bassa people, Egbura, Gbagyi and Ganagana people. There is also a notable Hausa population. The first settlers in Abuja are Gbagyi, Bassa people, Egbira/Egbura people before the Usman Danfodio religious war came to Northcentral, Abuja South. After the kingship throne was won by the Egbura people from the Bassa people, the Egbura ruled the people, but allowed the Hausa to retain the spiritual position as Imam for the Muslim ummah of the city. Abaji kingdom headed by the Ona of Abaji (chairman FCT Council of Chiefs), is the oldest traditional institution in Federal Capital Territory, Nigeria. The land was formerly under the old Koton Karfe kingdom, but agreed to join the Federal Capital Territory for developmental purposes.

The Abaji Council shares common boundaries with Kogi and Niger and Nasarawa States respectively.

In 2014, the then-Chairman of the Abaji Area Council Hon. Yahaya Garba received an award for the most ethical responsible local government in the FCT, from the Centre for Ethics and Self Value Orientation. Hon. Abubakar Umar Abdullahi of the All Progressives Congress (APC) became the chairman of Abaji Area Council in the February 12, 2022, chairmanship election of the FCT.

The postal code for the area is 905101. Abaji local government area consists of two districts and ten electoral wards.

== Economy ==
In the Abaji local government region, farming and trade are highly valued. The Abaji main market serves as a platform for a wide range of goods to be bought and sold.

== Geography ==
The Abaji local government region has an average annual temperature of 29 °C (84 °F) and a total area of 992 square kilometres. The region experiences two distinct seasons, known as the dry and the wet seasons, with an average humidity of 39%.

=== Average temperature ===
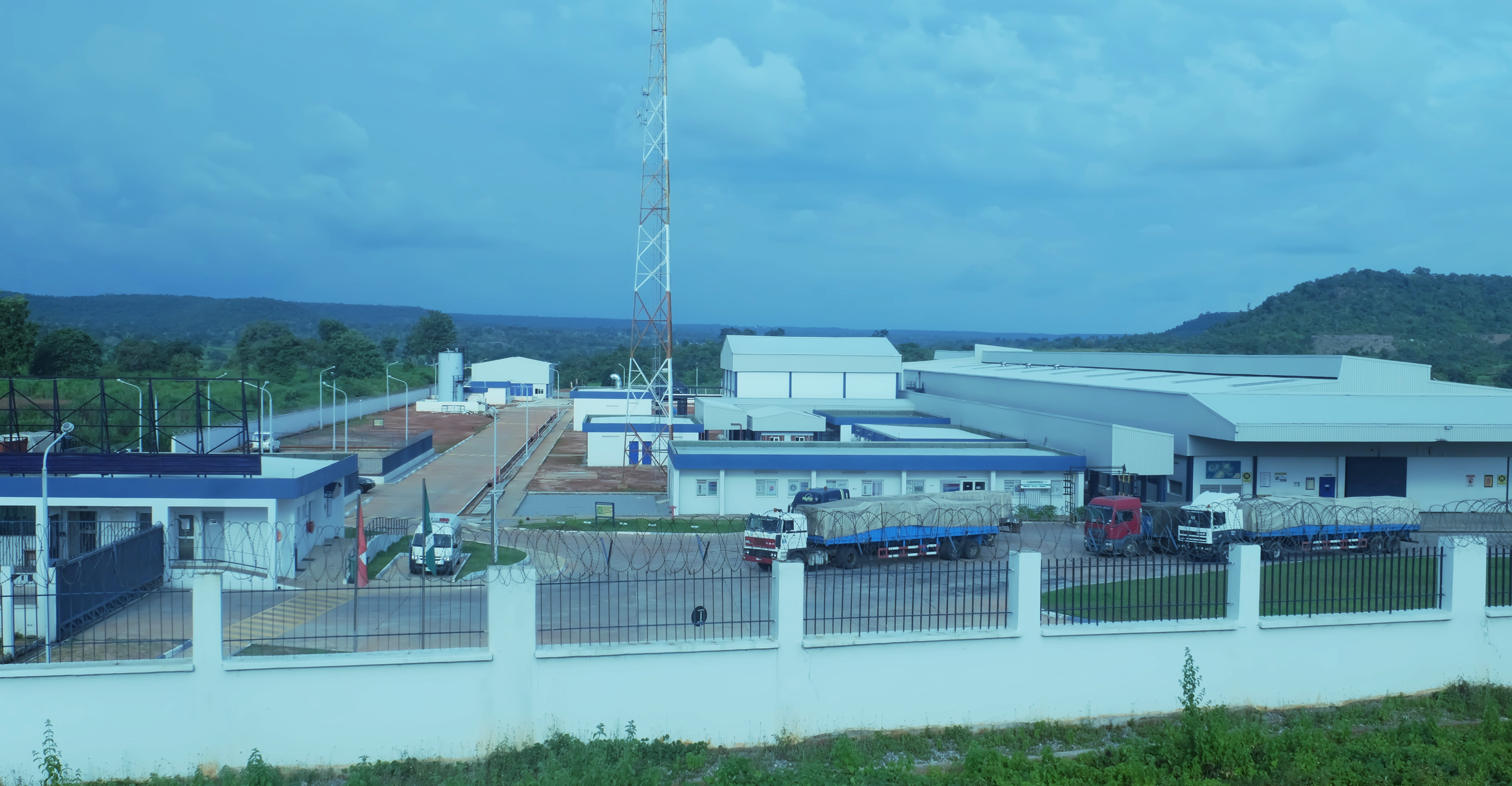
This Nestle water plant is located in Abaji, Federal Capital Territory. Commissioned in 2016, it's the fourth plant the company owns in Nigeria.

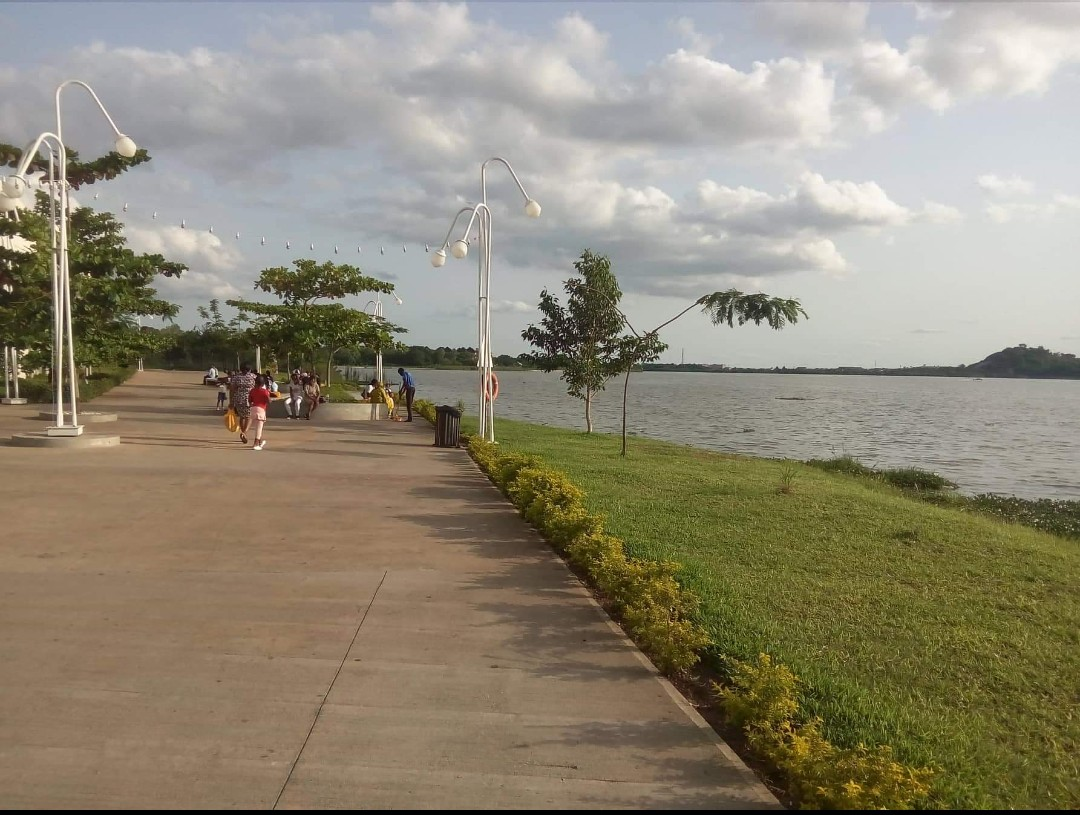
Abaji lake

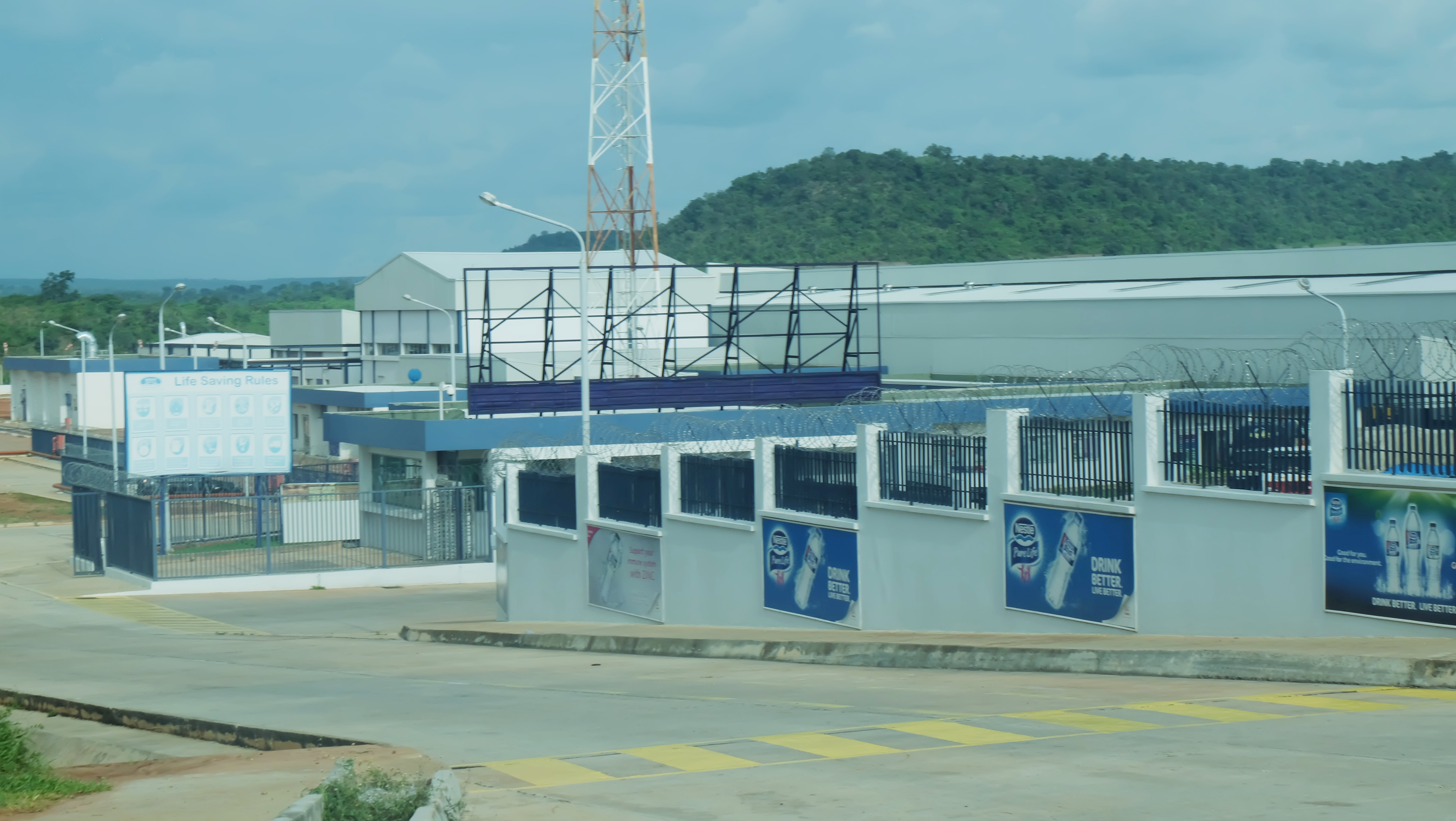
Nestle water plant, Abaji. Abuja

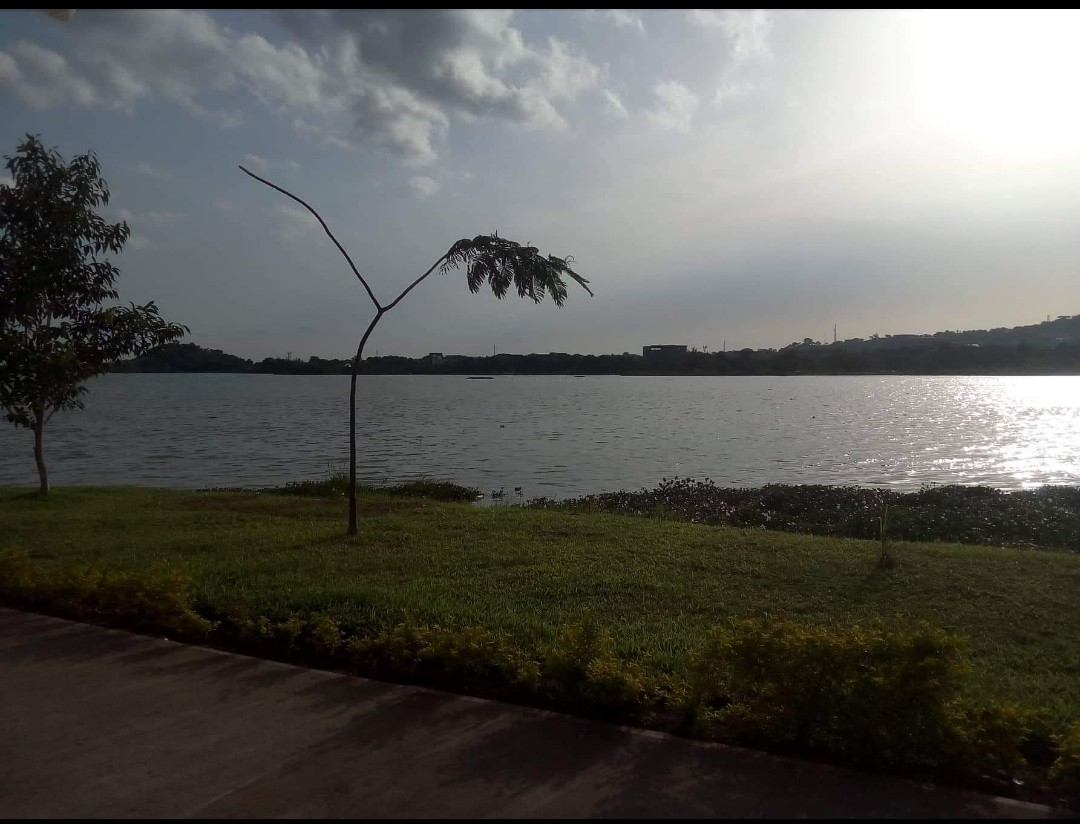
Abaji lake side

With an average daily high temperature of 33 °C (92 °F), the hot season spans 2.8 months, from January 26 to April 19. At an average high temperature of 33 °C (92 °F) and low temperature of 24 °C (76 °F), April is the hottest month of the year in Abaji. With an average daily maximum temperature below 29 °C (85 °F), the cool season spans 3.5 months, from June 25 to October 8. December is the coldest month of the year in Abaji, with typical highs and lows of 32 °C (90 °F) and 18 °C (65 °F), respectively.
