= List of villages in Yobe State =

This is a list of villages and settlements in Yobe State, Nigeria organised by local government area (LGA) and district/area (with postal codes also given).

== By postal code ==
LGA	District / Area	Postal code	Villages
Bade	Bade	631101	Adia; Alagarno; Amshi; Azam; Bursari; Chirawa; Dalia; Dikum; Dogona; Gabaruwa; Gapchia; Garin-Dallari; Garinkura; Gasamu; Gashua; Gogaram; Gweek; Gwuiyo; Jawa; Jawun; Karage; Katamba; Katuzu; Lawan-Alwali; Lawan-Audu; Lawan-Fani; Lawan-Musa; LawanFannam; Muguram; N.A Kaku; Ngelewa; Ngeliabe; Sarkin-Hausawa; Tagli; Tarjiwa; Wasur; Yakuburi; Zabadam
Bursari	Bursari	620103	Bade Gana; Bayammari; Bula; Buruta; Butsari; Damana; Damanawa; Dambuk; Danani; Dapchi; Gadiriri; Gareji Tsamowa; Garin Alhaji; Garin Boka; Garin Lamido; Garindole; Giljabi; Giruwon; Gojiji Korem; Goroji; Gruawa; Guba; Guji; Gumsa Gama; Jafinori; Jibirinti; Juluri; Kajimaram; Kariari; Kindilwa; Komandugu; Kurnawa; Massaba; Shettimari; Sundwa; Warodi; Yobe
Damaturu	Damaturu (Rural)	620101	Bula Kus; Bulaburum; Bulama Fordi; Chungul Dambaram; Chungul Jabbari; Damakasu; Damburam; Dankalwa; Debsa; Gabai; Garin Maisaja; Goni Matar; Gorogi; Gubberi; Gulamarram; Gumunta; Itsari; Kaburu; Kaita; Kalalawa; Kontula; Korari; Kuilamu; Kukareta; Kunguwol; Kuskuri; Makunari; Malamuhari; Mallam Tari; Marta; Nuw; Sasawa
Fika	Fika	622104	Anzie; Boza; Bulakos;Babaji; Chana; Daniski; Daya; Didim; Diffuel; Dozi; Dumbulwa; Fika; Fusami; Gadaka; Garin Goge;Garin Usaku;Galamo; Garin Aba; Garin Jaji; Garin Wayo; Gashaka; Gashinge; Gashua; Godowoli; Gudi; Gurijaji; Jaga; Jamgadole; Jangarsiri; Kadi; Karem; Lewe; Maiduwa; Maluri; Mazawun; Mubi; Ngalda; Paiono; Shembire; Shoye T.Nanai; Turmi; Yelwa; Zei
Fune	Fune	622105	Abakire; Aigada; Alagarno; Balanyiwa; Bam; Banshe; Basam; Bauwa; Bindigi; Bufuna; Bulakus; Chirokusko; Damagum; Dawura; Dogonkuka; Dubbol; Dumbulwa; Fajalare; Fulatari; Fune; Gabatasha; Gishiwari; Goyeri; Gremari; Gudugurka; Gunnga; Gununu; Jajere; Jamari; Jauro Bukar; Jauro Isa; Jika; Kafaje; Kamarum; Kasko; Kayeri; Kolere; Koriel; Kwajula; Kwalte; Lawan-Kalam; Manawaji; Manwaji; Mashio marmari; Mil-Biyar; Ngelshengale; Ngelzarma; Shamaka; Sudande; Tailai
Geidam	Geidam	632101	Abachari; Ashekri; Badi; Balle; Bisuga; Borko; Chirawa; Dabkariba; Dagambi; Damakarwa; Dejina; Dilawa; Fakuri; Futchimiran; Galaria; Gallaba; Geidam; Gosora; Gumsa; Hausari; Karamti; Kawuri; Keleri; Kelluri; Korkio; Kukoram; Kusur; Kwiri; Lariski; Maannam; Magario; Maidari; Maleri; Murimari; Musari; Nallewa; Rogo; Shame-Kura; Zugu-Ngilewa
Gujba	Gujba	621101	Bara; Bokwai; Borno-Kiji; Bukul; Bularaba; Bulturam; Bumsa; Buni Gari; Buni Yadi; Chandam; Dadingel; Dadma; Dikshi; Garinchina; Gatumba; Gazagana; Gominja; Goriri; Gotala; Gotumba; Gujba; Gulani; Gutunia; Kaduba; Katarko; Kolere Bomo; Ligda; Mafeni; Maladuwari; Mallam-Dunari; Mandum; Matal; Ngeltawa; Ngumal; Ngurbuwa; Njibulwa; Shinda; Taro; Wagun; Waranya
Gulani	Gulani	621102	Bara; Borno-Kiji; Bularaba; Bumsa; Burasari; Chandam; Dokshi; Gabai; Gagure; Gargari; Garin Tuwo; Kukuwa; Kushimaga; Ngulwa; Ngurun; Nguzoa; Ruhu; Tetteba; Zango
Jakusko	Jakusko	631102	Bayam; Buduwa; Daifa; Dudua; Dumbari; Gamajam; Ganya; Garin Maiturmi; Garinsalha; Gibbo; Gidigid; Gogaram; Goldimari; Gurunga; Jaba; Jakusko; Japbo; Japoji; Jawur; Katamona; Labo; Lafiya-Loi; Muguram; N.Gambo; Nasari; Ngelsom; Saminaka; Zabudum; Zeddi
Karasuwa	Karasuwa	630103	Bukarti; Fajiganari; Garin Gawo; Garu-Guna; Gasma; Jaji-Maji; Karasuwa; Waro; Yajiri; Wachakal; Kafetuwa; Dalari; Abaridi; Madugabari; Mamiram; Lamido Audu; Kinnariram; Kilbuwa; Tatikori; Garin Malam; Simeldi; Garin Alhaji; Garin Gyada; Kwana; Barderi; Melawuri; Bukku; Dunari; Maina Ari; Gawu; Mala Kunu; Alajiri, Chumbusko; Zolo; Damamini; Dogon Jeji; Rumfar Kara; Tasha Kargo; Lamido Ngaine; Hardo Kabo; Garin Mammadu; Karau Kawu, Wuri Bawuri; Lamido Hassan, Jajeri; Garin Jarma; Zango; Tabawa; Daban Giwa, Ngurodi
Machina	Machina	630102	Adturu; Barinari-Lamiri; Bogo; Bulseri; Damai; Dimago; Dole; Faramiram; Flimaram; Garin; Garin Kinna; Garwadole; Gogi; Gunsi; Kabaduna; Kabera; Kom-Komma; Koremarun; Kuka-Yasku; Lamisu; Machina; Mamada; Maskandare; Maskarari; Meori; Sabawa; Shekori; Tagamama
Nangere	Mamudo	622103	Bala; Dakasko; Garintuja; Mamudo
Nangere	Nangere	622102	Dowasa; Fakarau; Garin Gambo; Kukuri; Nangere; Tarajim
Nguru	Nguru (Rural)	630101	Aroro; Bajigama; Bakwa; Bambori; Bilelam; Bujiji; Bulabulin; Bulangua; Bulanguaram; Buleri; Bundi; Dadara; Dogana; Dogon-Kuka; Dumsai; Garbi; Garin Malum; Garin Naruwa; Hausari; Jigamari; Kakori; Kanuri; Karanbari; Kisogana; Maidashi; Maja-Kura; Mamnia; Margadu; Masari; Mirba-Kabir; Mirba-Sagir; Ngilewa; Tashakang; Wazzagl; Wusur; Yamdem; Yamdugu; Zolo
Potiskum	Potiskum	622101	Alaraba; Badejo; Chalumno; Dagare; Daniski; Daria; Dazigal; Kukargadu; Potiskum; Siminti
Tarmuwa	Tarmuwa	620102	Babangida; Barkami; Biriri; Borno-Kiji; Bulturi; Churokusko; Dabala; Garga; Jumbam; Lantaiwa; Mandadawa; Shegau
Yunusari	Yunusari	632102	Baituwa; Bomba; Bukti; Bulabulin; Buluk Buluk; Chillima; Chokolo; Damatoshia; Dekwe; Dilala; Diriti; Dogaltura; Garin Kaigama; Gremadi; Gremari; Gursula; Jilo; Kafaje; Kalgi; Kanamma; Karaguwa; Karigi; Konta Kunu; Kusur; Mairari; Malgawa; Mar; Maruduari; Mineklbu; Mosogun; Ngamzai; Ngirabo; Sasamna; Sumbal; Umari; Wadi; Yaro; Yunusari Town; Zagibinri; Zedi
Yusufari	Yusufari	631103	Alagiri; Alanjirori; Budum; Bukardi; Bula Madu; Bulatula; Bunsar; Burari; Garin Lawan; Garin Momodu; Gayuameri; Grema Burari; Gulmiri; Gumsi; Guya; Hangilam; Jebuwa; Jogua; Kajimaram; Kaska; Kulala; Kurusalia; Lalawa; Ligarikura; Maimalari; Mayori; Ndiju; Njikilamma; Sumbar; Tilotoluwa; Yusufari; Zingidi; Zumugu

== By electoral ward ==
Below is a list of polling units, including villages and schools, organised by electoral ward.

LGA	Ward	Polling Unit Name
Bade	Dagona	Dagona Pri Shc; Dagona Viewing Centre C.; Dala Primary School; Murza Bulama Gate; Garin Manda, Pri. Sch Missilli; Mainiya Bulama Gate; Bizi Pri School; Garin Manda
Bade	Gwio-Kura	Gwio - Kura Pri School; Gwio Bulama's Gate; Gwio Dina, Pri. Sch.; Ngelbowa Pri. School; Ngeljabe, Pri. Sch I; Chirawa Bulama Gate; Mainari Pri. School
Bade	Katuzu	Katuzu, Pri. Sch.; Katuzu, View Centre; Unguwar M. Sale, K. M. Sale; Unguwar M. Sale, K. M. Sale II; State Agric., State Agric. Office I; State Agric., State Agric. Office II
Bade	Lawan Audu/Lawan Al - Wali	College Of Education; Ramat Pri. School; Goni Aji; Lawan Audu; Asibitin Agana I; Asibitin Agana II; Former Nepa; Garin Lamido; Hospital Gate; Benin Bayero
Bade	Lawan Fannami	Ari Kulola, Ari Kulola Gate; Filin Tanda Open Space; Babuje Pri School; Ya'U Gara Kofar Ya'U; Tsangaya I Open Space; Tsangaya II Open Space; Gdss Gashu'A; Hassan Mai Ung.
Bade	Lawan Musa	Emirs Palace I; Emirs Palace II; Ma'Aji D/Bappa; Umar Sulieman I; Umar Sulieman II; Dugum Jambo I; Dugum Jambo II
Bade	Sarkin Hausawa	Talbari Viewing Centre; Talbari L. E. A.; Kalegha; Alh. Sidi Ali; Islamiyya; Anes B.
Bade	Tagali/Sugum	Sugum 1 B. Gate; Sugum II Pri Sch; Gapiwa; Kabayo; Tagama Open Space; Tagali Pri Sch; Madamuwa Bulama Gate; Gabarwa Open Space; Tak Vir - Vir
Bade	Usur/Dawayo	Usur Pri. School; Azbak, Pri. Sch. I; Azbak Pri. Sch. II Bulama Gate; Alagarno; Bida/Tumpapi Jumami; Paga; Azam Kura B. Gate I; Azam Kura B. Gate II; Dawayo; Jigawa
Bade	Zangon Musa/Zango Umaru	Sarkin Z. Umaru (O. S); Kofar Dogo Ado; Sarkin Zango Musa; Zango Viewing Centre; Shehu Mai Gura; Nomau Na Inna; Mamman Dabi; Zango Islamiyya; Kofar Baba Nashehu
Bursari	Bayamari	Aburi Dandali Mai Gari; Aji Dawari Kofar Mai Gari; Batar, Pri. Sch.; Bayamari, Dispensary; Bayamari, Dandali Lawanti; Bayamari, Motor Park; Damaya, Dandali Maigari; Gajeri, Dandali Maigari; Galtimari, Dandali Maigari
Bursari	Damnawa/Juluri	Damnawa Kofar Mai Gari; Gamsawa I. Kofar Mai Gari; Gamsawa II. Pri School; Juluri I. Pri School; Juluri II. Pri School
Bursari	Danani	Danani, Dandali Kofar Maigari; Garin Fulatari Dandali M/Gari; Lawanti, Dandali Maigari; M. Bulatari, Dandali Maigari; Maji Kawari Pri School; Mastafari, Dandali Maigari; Turban Gida, Pri. Sch.; Ummarari Matti, Pri. Sch.; Ummarari Matti, Dan Dalin Mai Gari
Bursari	Dapchi	Ajari, Court Room; Ajari, Pri. Sch.; Bade Gana, Pri. Sch.; Bulangu, Dandali Kofar Maigari; Bulangu, Dandali Kofar Makeri; Jaba Kura, Dandali Kpofar Maigari; Motor Park, Old Motor Park; Motor Park, Kofar M. Uba; Ngeljabi, Dandali Lamido; Sarkin Pawa, Kofar S. Pawa; Teleko Lamido, Pri. Sch.; Viewing Centre, Viewing Centre
Bursari	Garun Dole / Garin Alkali	Dogon Marke, Dandali Kofar; Garin Alkali Pri School; Garun Dole, Pri. Sch.; Girim, Pri. Sch.; Ilaila, Pri. Sch.; Jawa, Pri. Sch.; Koromari, Pri. Sch.; Mashayar Gawo Dandali; Rinukunu; Tarbutu, Pri. Sch. I; Tarbutu, Pri. Sch. II
Bursari	Guba	Dapso, Pri. Sch.; Gilbasu, Pri. Sch.; Guba, Pri. Sch.; G. Kabaju, Dandali Maigari; Kankare, Pri. Sch.; Marare, Pri. Sch.; Monguno, Dandali Maigari; Sunowa, Dandali Maigari
Bursari	Guji / Metalari	Ajiri, Pri. Sch.; Ajiri, Goni Muktar; Ali Ganari, Dandali Maigari; Bururu, Pri. Sch.; Dajimi, Kofar Maigari; Karasuwa, Dandali Maigari; Kuchi-Kuchiri, Dandali Maigari; Lawangirari, Dandali Maigari; Makintari, Pri. Sch.
Bursari	Kaliyari	Baya Bade, Pri. Sch.; Bursari, Dandali Maigari; Diga, Pri. Sch.; Gamsawa, Pri. Sch.; Kaga Dama, Pri. Sch.; Kakanderi, Pri. Sch.; Kali Yari, Pri. Sch.; Mal Wuriya, Pri. Sch; Tunga, Dandali Maigari; Warodi, Pri. Sch. I; Warodi, Pri. Sch. II
Bursari	Masaba	Dadigar, Pri. Sch.; Dadigar, Hausari II; Daskum, Pri. Sch.; Dumburi, Pri. Sch.; Dumburi, Dispensary; Gadine, Pri. Sch.; Gangawa, Pri. Sch.; Girwan Pri School; Masaba, Pri. Sch.; Masaba, Dispensary; Masaba, Sarikin Pawa
Damaturu	Bindigari/Pawari	Alhajiri, Alhajiri Open Space; Ali Marami, Pri. Sch.; Bindigari Primary School; Pawari Open Space; Forestry/Forestry Office; Hayas Cinema, Hayas Cinema II; Hayas Cinema, Hayas Cinema I; L. E. A Office / L. E. A Office; Rumfan Idrisa, Rumfan Idris; State Ministryof Works
Damaturu	Damakasu	Alhaji Amodori /Alh. Modori; Damakasu Dispensary /Damakasu Dispensary; Damakasu, Pri. Sch.; Falari B. Fandi, Fandi's Gate; Kimeri/Kimeri
Damaturu	Damaturu Central	Abasha, Kofar Bulama; Usman Koriyel Gate; Alhaji Male Gate; Central, Pri. Sch. Central Pri. Sch.; Mairi, Mairi Dispensary; Mairi, Area Court Office; Mallam Mattari, M. Mattari; Manu Tela, Manutela; Manu Tela, Babban Tsangaya; Motor Park, Motor Park (In Gate); Gujba Goni Muktar Pri Sch; Village Head M. Goni; Water Board Gate; R. E. B. Gate.
Damaturu	Gambir/Maduri	Gambir, Gambir Pri. Sch.; Kafitilowa, Kafitilowa; Maduri, Maduri; Mustiri, Mustiri; Usmanti, Usmanti
Damaturu	Kalallawa/Gabai	Dusuwa Kangol, Dusuwa Kangol; Gabai Primary School; Kalallawa, Kalallawa Pri. Sch.; Kalallawa, Kalallawa Dispensary; Mandinari, Mandinari Bulama's Gate; Tumbel Tumbel Open Space; Mangari, Mangari Open Space
Damaturu	Kukareta/Warsala	Dabugu, Dabugu Open Space; Kukareta, Dispensary; Kukareta, Pri. Sch.; Ladan Musari, Ladan Musari's Gate; Goni Usman Gate; Tumur M. Tubo, Tumur M. Tubo; Warsala, Warsala Pri. Sch.
Damaturu	Maisandari/Waziri Ibrahim Estate	Federal Polytechnic, Fed-Poly Dispensary; Fuguri, Fuguri Pri. Sch.; Ben . Kalio Housing, Kalio Bus Stop; Maisandari, Maisandari Pri. Sch.; Ngaborowa Pri School; Waziri Ibrahim Est, At Estate Pri. Sch.
Damaturu	Murfa Kalam	Dikumari Pri School; Dumbulwa Open Space; Dungurum D. Open Space; Kasaisa K. Open Space; Murfa, Murfa Kalam Pri. Sch.; S. Gari Murfa Tsangaya K. Bulama
Damaturu	Nayinawa	Bulama Modu, Modu's Gate; B. S Kofar Bulama Shetimari; Bulama Talba, Bulama Talba Gate; Ibrahim Abacha Housing Estate, Housing Est. Pri. Sch.; Nayinawa Bore Hole Open Space; Nayi Nawa Pri. Sch, Nayi Nawa Pri. Sch.; Nayinawa Tsallake Open Space; Tsamiyan Lilo, Tsamiyan Lilo; Tukuban Akawu Open Space; Veterinary Clinic, Veterinary
Damaturu	Njiwaji/Gwange	Bulama Kurma, Kurma's Gate; Bulama Kurma, Kulloma's Gate; Fire Service Office; Maternity Clinic, Clinic; Modu Fadkema, Modu Fadkema's Gate; Njiwaji Pri. Sch, Pri. Sch I; Njiwaji Pri. Sch, Pri. Sch II; Injiwaji Layout, K/Massalaci R.; Pompomari Bore Hole O. S
Damaturu	Sasawa/Kabaru	Fulo Ngomari; Goni Mastafari, Goni Mustafa's Gate; Kabaru. Kabaru, Pri. Sch.; Musamiri B. Fandi, Fand's Gate; Sasawa, Pri. Sch.; Sungul Buduwa Open Space; Tungusa Goni Usman, Goni Usman's Gate; Tungusa Open Space; Yettimari Open Space; Zaramiri B. Abacha, Abacha's Gate; Ari Ashemiri Open Space; Dabukururi Open Space
Fika	Daya/Chana	Chana, Pri. Sch.; Daya, Pri. Sch. I; Daya, Pri. Sch. II; Male, Pri. Sch.; Siminti, Pri. Sch.; Kukar Gadu, Pri. Sch. I; Kukar Gadu, Pri. Sch. II; Kukawa, Pri. Sch.; Yelwa, Pri. Sch.
Fika	Fika/Anze	Anze, Pri. Sch. I; Anze, Pri. Sch. II; Bogaru, Work Dept.; Bogwuna Tinja, Magistrate Court; Bogwuna Tinja, Pri. Sch.; Bogwuna Tinja, Nig. Prison Service; Mebi S. Yara Bakin Rijiya O. S; Sirife, Viewing Centre; Sirife Gindin Rumfa Open Space
Fika	Gadaka/Shembire	Boza Ganga, Kofar Maigari; Bulabulin, Pri. Sch.; Dala, Kofar Mai Gari; Garin Gamji, Pri. Sch.; Garin Goge, Pri. Sch. I; Garin Goge, Pri. Sch. II; Jangam, Kofar Maiunguwa; Hausari, Kofar Maiunguwa; Maiduwa, Pri. Sch.; Madaki, Old Bore Hole; Sabon Layi, Kofar Maiungwa; Unguwar Adamu D. Open Space; Unguwar Bulus, C. P Sch. I; Unguwar Bulus C, P Sch. II; Unguwar Dala K, Kofar Maiunguwa; Unguwar Mamman Disa, Bore Hole; Unguwar Katala K/Maiung.; Unguwar Yaro Guze, K / Mai Ung. I; Unguwar Yaro Guze, K / Mai Ung. II; Zamba, Pri. Sch. I; Zamba, Pri. Sch. II; Tinja Bazam, Pri. Sch.
Fika	Gudi / Dozi / Godo Woli	Dade Yasua, Kofar Maiunguwa; Doffo Ofara, Pri. Sch.; Gamari, Pri. Sch.; Gamari, Dispensary; Garin Alaramma, Kofar Maiunguwa; Godowolli, Pri. Sch.; Nahuta, Pri. Sch.; Lewe, Pri. Sch.; Zadawa, Pri. Sch.
Fika	Janga / Boza / Fa. Sawa / T. Nanai	Burni, Pri. Sch.; Damazai, Pri. Sch. I; Damazai, Pri. Sch. II; Dogo Abare, Pri. Sch.; Gashaka, Pri. Sch.; Janga Dole, Pri. Sch.; Janga Siri Pri School; Koromchi, Pri. Sch.; Madodo Madaki, Kofar Maiunguwa; Zamani, Pri. Sch.
Fika	Mubi / Fusami / Garin Wayo	Banale, Pri. Sch.; Gadana, Pri. Sch.; Garin Eji, Pri. Sch.; Garin Wayo, Pri. Sch.; Mubi Fusami, Pri. Sch I; Mubi Fusami, Pri. Sch II
Fika	Ngalda/Dumbulwa	Dumbulwa, Pri. Sch.; Gagaru, Pri. Sch. I; Gagaru, Pri. Sch. II; Garin Chindo, Pri. Sch.; Kerem Bello, Pri. Sch.; Ngalda, Ri. Sch.; Sabon Layi, Dispensary; Tadan Gara, Pri. Sch.; Tundun Wada, Dispensary I; Tundun Wada, Dispensary II
Fika	Shoye/Garin Aba	Balde, Balde Pri. Sch.; Garin Abba, Pri. Sch. I; Garin Abba, Pri. Sch. II; Garin Dauya, Pri. Sch.; Gashinge Pri. Sch.; Lampo, Kofar Mai Unguwa
Fika	Turmi / Maluri	Dan Burni, Dispensary; Gurjaje, Pri. Sch; Manawachi, Pri. Sch.; Turmi, Pri. Sch.; Unguwa Tambari, Pri. Sch
Fika	Zangaya/Mazawaun	Zangaya Pri. School; Mazawun Pri School; Dogon Kuka Pri School; Duffuwel Pri. School; Duffunel Adowa Open Space; Dogon Kuka Gari Open Space
Fune	Abakire / Ngenlshengele / Shamka	Abakire, Pri. Sch.; Bare Kuri Kofar Bulama; Belon Kofar Bulama; Garin Baushe, Pri. Sch.; Jauro Gako Kofar Bulama; Lamido Gombe K/Bulama; Ngelmodoru, Pri. Sch.; Ngelshe Ngele, Pri. Sch.; Shamka Kofar Bulama; Shilowa Kofar Bulama; Suddande, Pri. Sch.; Walkere, Pri. Sch.; Yaskawal Kofar Bulama
Fune	Borno Kiji/Ngarho/Bebbende	Adore Kofar Bulama; Bebbende, Pri. Sch.; Bindigi, Pri. Sch.; Borno, Kiji Pri. Sch.; Bummitammi Kofar Bulama; Jauro H. Waje K/Bulama; Lamido Juli Kofar Bulama; Ngel Kol Kofar Bulama; Palidachi Kofar Bulama
Fune	Damagum Town	Anguwar Kuka, Kofar M. Hudu I; Anguwar Kuka, Kofar M. Hudu II; Anguwar Dutsi, Market Stall Store; Bakati S. Gari, Co-Operative Store I; Bakati S. Gari, Co-Operative Store II; Bakin Kasuwa, Kofar S. Aska I; Bakin Kasuwa, Kofar S. Aska II; Damagum, Central Pri. Sch. I; Damagum, Central Pri. Sch. II; Sabon Gari, Noa's Office
Fune	Daura/Bulanyiwa/Dubbul/Bauwa	Alangefe Kofar Bulama; Bauwa 'I' Kofar Bulama; Bauwa 'II' Kofar Bulama; Bulanyiwa, Pri. Sch. I; Bulanyiwa, Pri. Sch. II; Daura, Pri. Sch.; Daura, Bank Of The North; Dubbol, Pri. Sch. I; Dubbol, Pri. Sch. II; Suru Kofar Bulama
Fune	Dogon Kuka/Gishiwari/Gununu	Dogon Kuka, Market Stall I; Dogon Kuka Kofar Bulama; Dogon Kuka Pri School; Dumza, Bakin Rijiya; Gadafowa Kofar Bulama; Galtai Kofar Bulama; Gishiwari, Pri. Sch.; Gubana, Pri. Sch.; Gununu, Pri. Sch.; Ningi, Pri. Sch.; Ngam Dare Kofar Bulama; Sabon Garin Idi Barde, Pri. Sch.; Walkatu Kofar Bulama
Fune	Fune/Ngelzarma/Milbiyar/Lawan Kalam	Anuguwar Kuka, Dispensary; Anguwan Kuka Kofar Bulama; Anguwan Kuka Pri School; Bulama Mustapha Dispensary I; Bulama Mustapha Dispensary II; Fune Primary School; Kujiyel Bakin Rijiya; Lawan Kalam K/Bulama; Lawan Kalam, Bulama Gate; Lili, Pri. Sch. I; Lili, Pri. Sch. II; Lili Kofar Sarki; Mallam Ya'U Kofar Bulama; Mil Biyar, Pri. Sch.; Mil-Biyar S. Garin Bukar; Sheriri Kofar Bulama
Fune	Gaba Tasha/Aigada/Dumbulwa	Aigada Mai Kasuwa, Pri. Sch.; Aigada Mai Gishiwa K/Bulama; Dumbulwa, Pri. Sch.; Gaba Tasha, Pri. Sch.; Ibrahim Gaba, G. S. S; Joringel Zoto, Zoto Pri. Sch.; Joringel Zoto Kofar Bulama; Nyakiren Tsanya Kofar Bulama; Saleran Gindin Tsamiya K/Mai Ung
Fune	Gudugurka/Marmar I	Rigim Kofar Bulama; Dufuna, Pri. Sch.; Dufuna, Health. Centre; G. Wakili. Bakin Rijiya; Gremari. Bakin Rijiya; Gudugurka, Pri. Sch.; Gurungu Bakin. Rijiya; Marimari. Pri. Sch.
Fune	Jajere/Banellewa/Babbare	Anguwar Ngoridi, Dispensary; Babbare J. Buba, Pri. Sch.; Banalawa, Pri. Sch.; Bangitare Kofar Bulama; Dawaya, Pri. Sch.; Doikwal Kofar Bulama; Dugel Kofar Bulama; Gayeje Kofar Bulama; Katotiyel Kofar Bulama; Kurfawa Ayuba Kofar Bulama; Lawanti, Pri. Sch; Nkoljalaje Kofar Bulama; Shidol Kofar Bulama; Shobbunga, Bulama Gate; Tsagayar Tudu, Veterinary Clinic
Fune	Kayeri	Ang Modu Health Centre; Amar Chiya, Pri. Sch.; Daya, Pri. Sch.; Dogon Kuka B Pri. Sch.; Jauro Kuliya Kofar Bulama; Kayeri, Pri. Sch.; Kasara Kuma, Pri. Sch.; Shami Katuwa, Pri. Sch.; Taiyu, Pri. Sch; Jauro Kuka Kofar Bulama; Watiwani Kofar Bulama; Tello Bangaje Pri School
Fune	Kollere/Kafaje	Aigada B. Bazam Kofar Bulama; Aigada J. Abdul Kofar Bulama; Balarabe, Pri. Sch.; D/G/Gkila, Pri. Sch.; Dumowal Kofar Bulama; Garin Kyari, Pri. Sch.; Garin Tuje, Pri. Sch.; Gadama Mallam K/Bulama; Kolere, Pri. Sch.; Kolere, Clinic; Kafaje, Pri. Sch.; Nosa Kofar Bulama
Fune	Mashio	Bagana Kofar Bulama; Baya Banza Kofar Bulama; Bamshanga, Pri. Sch.; Bulama Madore K/Bulama 'I'; Bulama Madore K/Bulama 'II'; Bulakawa Kofar Bulama; Dodiwa Kofar Bulama; Dusuwa Kofar Bulama; Gaskira L. Shehu K/Bulama; Dumbulwa, Pri. Sch.; Jauro Bodori K/Bulama; Jauro Birau Kofar Bulama; Jangam Garu Kofar Bulama; Kashanga Kofar Bulama; Kazalma Kofar Bulama; Kare Mai Gagare Kofar Bulama; Koriyel Kofar Bulama; Koibula, Pri. Sch.; Kwarawan Pri School; Ngelkoreji Kofar Bulama; Murba M. Ali, Pri. Sch.; Ngelkoreji, Bakin Rijiya; Ngelwande Kofra Bulama; Sutande Kofar Bulama; Sauda Kofar Bulama
Geidam	Asheikri	Alhaji Maigari, Viewing Centre; Fannamiri. Ngadala, Pri. Sch.; Fannamiri, Fannamiri Gate; Fulatari, Bulama Gate; Goniri, Pri. Sch.; Lawan Bakurari, Water Board; Mustapha Wanzan; Sunomari, Sunomari; Usman Kolorima, Maiunguwa's Gate
Geidam	Balle/Gallaba/Meleri	Balle Lawanti, Lawant's Gate; Balle, Pri. Sch.; Gallaba, Pri. Sch.; Kelluri Bulama, Bulama's Gate; Kelluri, Pri. Sch.; Lawan Bukarti, Bulama's Gate; Matakuskum, Bulama's Gate; Moborti, Bulama Gate; Shame Mairi, Bulama's Gate
Geidam	Damakarwa/Kusur	Aji Wango, Bulama's Gate; Ali Karimiri, Bulama's Gate; Ali Kari Miri Tsangaya B/Gate; Damakarwa Lawanti, Viewing Centre; Gobok, Bulama's Gate; Kindiram, Bulama's Gate; Kusur Lawanti. Kusur, Pri. Sch; Ngoro, Kayaiya Bulama Gate; Zairam Ngolkoyam, Bulama's Gate; Zugubi, Bulama's Gate.
Geidam	Dejina/Fukurti	Ali Gajiribulama's Gate; Bone Garal, Bulama Gate; Fukurti Kasuwa, Bulama's Gate; Fukurti Lawan, Lawan's Gate; Karau Kura, Bulama's Gate; Mainari, Bulama's Gate; Mallam Matari, Bulama Gate; Masada Village, Bulama's Gate
Geidam	Futchimiram	Bundiram, Bulama Gate; Futchimiram, Lawan's Gate; Futchimiram, Pri. Sch.; Garimari, Bulama's Gate; Goni Modu Goni, Bulama's Gate; Jilli, Bulama's Gate; Kasacciya, Bulama Gate; Ngilewa, Bulama's Gate; Ngulmi Kawuyindi B/Gate; Ngulmi Mammanti, Bulama's Gate
Geidam	Gumsa	Alhajiri, Pri. Sch.; Dunari Bujiri; Gasauri, Bulama's Gate; Gumsa Bakin Kasuwa, Bakin Kasuwa I; Gumsa Bakin Kasuwa, Bakin Kasuwa II; Gumsa Pri School 'I'; Gumsa Pri School II; Gumzuguyi, Bulama's Gate; Madi Kadawa, Bulama's Gate; Talum, Bulama's Gate
Geidam	Hausari	Alhaji Malumta, Bulama's Gate I; Alhaji Malumta, Bulama's Gate II; Bukar Sunoma, Bulama's Gate; Dauda Inusa, Maiung. Gate; Goni Dalatu, Bulama's Gate I; Goni Dalatu, Bulama's Gate II; Mai Anuguwa Buba, Mai Ung. Gate; Modu Tela Modu Tela Gate; Modu Tela, / G. S. S Geidam / G. S. S. Geidam; Modu Tela, / Upper Area Court - Upper Area Court; Mohammed Babin / Bulama's Gate; Mohammed Babin/ Kafela Pri. Sch. / Kafela Pri. Sch. I; Mohammed Babin/ Kafela Pri. Sch. / Kafela Pri. Sch. II; S. G. T Adamu, Sgt Adamu's Gate; Tobacco Store, Tobacco Store; Tobacco Store, High Court; Zaramiri, Zaramiri's Gate
Geidam	Ma'Anna/Dagambi	Dagambi, Bulama Gate; Dapchi Dambaram, Bulama's Gate; Isori, Bulama Gate; Kayaiya, Bulama's Gate; Kiriwa Dapso, Bulama's Gate; Kuwa Bare, Bulama's Gate; Ma'Anna, Pri. Sch.; Mairi Kuwa, Bulama's Gate; Makintari, Bulama's Gate; Ngayawa, Bulama's Gate
Geidam	Shame Kura / Dilawa	Dilawa, Dispensary; Jororo, Lawan's Gate; Kalgiri, Bulama's Gate; Mala Wango, Bulama 's Gate; Malumma Kawuwa, Bulama's Gate; Mawuwa Umarti, Bulama's Gate; Raga. Nguluri, Bulama's Gate; Shame Kura, Bulama's Gate; Wakil Ajibe, Bulama's Gate
Geidam	Zurgu Ngilewa / Borko	Awasai, Bulama's Gate; Borko, Pri. Sch.; Chungul, Bulama's Gate; Giza, Bulama's Gate; Kindilla, Bulama's Gate; Kawuri Bulama Gate; Ngilewa, Bulama's Gate; Ranna Sheriff, Bulama's Gate
Gujba	Bunigari/Lawanti	Azare/Magza, Ganji Makera; Gashua/Buramsira, Gashua Pri. Sch.; Bulama Yaga, Bunigari Market; Bulturi Yarmari, Lewa Gate; Buni Gari, Buni. Gari Pri. Sch.; Buni Lawanti, Sarkin Tasha I; Buni Lawanti, Sarkin Tasha II; Buni Lawanti, Ajamari
Gujba	Buniyadi North / South	Amadu Kapinta Ardo Sale Gate; Amadu Kapinta Yaro Gate; Shuwari Pri School; Bulama Auwami, Goni Haruna I; Bulama Auwami, Goni Harunaii; Bulama Auwami, Iliayasu Usman; Bulama Ngoma, Makinta Ali; Bulama Ngoma, Centralpri. Sch.; Goni Mattari,.Jalon's Gate; Isa Talala, Umaru M. Engine; Jauro Buba, Buba Ali; Jiri/Sumsumma, Bulama Saye's Gate; Muh'D Alewa Dr, Abdu Gate; Muh'D Alewa Islamiya Pri Sch; Mustapha Gamb0, Gabba Mai Rogo Gate; Railway Goni Habu Samaila Muh;D Gate; Railway Muh'D Kofar G/Gagare; Wakil Umar/Jauro Viewing Centre 'I'; Wakil Umar/Jauro Viewing Centre 'II'; Wakil Umar/Jauro Dispensary
Gujba	Dadingel	Dadingel Primary School; Marma, Marma Pri. Sch.; Muwura Madu Kime
Gujba	Goniri	Goni Jalori, Alh. M. Bura; Goniri, Central Pri. Sch. I; Goniri, Central Pri. Sch. II; Goniri Fulatari Alh Bukar Gate; Goniri Maruri, Alh. Lawan; Goni Maruri, Alh. Umaru Marus; Kimeri, Kimeri; Mallam Liwulamari, Kachala Fugu
Gujba	Gotala/Gotumba	Bobiri Boburi Open Space; Dishi Bulama Ali, Bulama Ali; Goni, Ngomari; Gotala Shetima Sidin, Gotala Market; Gotumba, Gotumba Pri. Sch. I; Gotumba, Gotumba Pri. Sch. II; Kwar Mari, Kwar Mari; Kunduli Yari, Kunduli Yari; Kyari Kauri, Kyari Kauri; Shettima Mawari Open Space; Sugumi Jiddari Sogumi; Wuyabchi Sanda Wuyabchi Open Space
Gujba	Gujba	Ambiya Tasha, Pri. Sch; Bungai Bulama Ali, Bulama Ali; Garin Itace, Garin Itace; Gujba Central Pri School; Gujba Area Court; Horeriyiwa Jamtari Horeyiwa Road O. S; K. B/Kukuwa Tasha, Kukuwa Pri. Sch I; K. B/Kukuwa Tasha, Kukuwa Pri. Sch II; Kasatchia, Kasatchia; Katarko, Katarko Bulama; Kojellere Open Space; Kojellere Bakin Ngeljul Gate; Kukuwa Wakaltu Ali Gate; Ligdir Tasha; Manjim Kura/Manjigan. Manjim; Ngomma/Ngazar Ngamma Gate; Ngel Biyawal, Ngel Biyawal; Sherifri, Sherifri; Turo, Turo; Wule Wule Open Space
Gujba	Mallam Dunari	Ambiya Kura Open Space; Bulturam Kura, Pri. Sch.; Burniwa, Burniwa; Gurma/Kolkola. Gurma; Kadauri, Kadauri Pri. Sch.; Malam Dunari Bakin Koyel Tela Bumis Gate; M. Dunari Ngubutori M. Dunari Pri Sch; Surdi Kumai Open Space
Gujba	Mutai	Bandilla Ardo, Ngididoji Yelwa; Bukkel Alh. Bakura, Buba Gate; Daddawayel, Pri. Sch.; Denderia/Labba. Denderia; Garin Gabas, Garin Gabas; Jammre/Kikiwa, Bamme's Gate; Mutai, Mutai Pri. Sch.; Nassarawa, Sarkin Pawa
Gujba	Ngurbuwa	Bulama Fantami/Jurkauri Open Space; Bulturam Gana/L. Dala Kezlum Open Space; Kusuluwaram Open Space; Maram Kura M. Gana; Muktum Kura / Gana - Muktum Kura; Ngurabawa Lawanti, Pri. Sch. I; Ngurabawa Lawanti, Pri. Sch. II; Ngurmai Bulama
Gujba	Wagir	Chiromari M. Kawu Gate; Jamtari/Ngel Kalaji. M. Garba's Gate; Nyakere/Jauro. Liman Adamu; Wagir/Ngel Auwa. Wagir Pri. Sch.
Gulani	Borno Kiji/Tetteba	Alagarno Muh'D Mai Hulla Gate; Borno Kiji, Adamu Karere Gate; Garin Aboyi, Yelwa Abuna Gate; Garin Ayada Open Space; Marwa Gaja Open Space; Mai Kano Ibrahim Dahiru Gate; Maikano Ibrahim Garin Mai Kano (O. S); Tetteba, Pri. Sch.; Tetteba, Market Place; Tetteba Garin Njilde Open Space; Tetteba Mudi Tela Bukar Gate; T. S/Ym/Musa. Alh. Juju Gate; Yango, Yakubu Gate
Gulani	Bularafa	Bularafa Lawanti, Pri. Sch.; Bularafa, Old Market; Bularafa, Alh. Shuaibu Gate; Bularafa, Secondary School; Chilari Bandila, Bandila Gate; Kukuwa, Pri. Sch.; Shishiwaji, Pri. Sch.
Gulani	Bumsa	Bumsa, Bumsa Market I; Bumsa, Bumsa Market II; Bumsa, Sani's Gate; Bumsa, Audu K. Gate; Dan Kanchi, Dan K. Gate; Gar Gari, Pri. Sch. I; Gar Gari, Pri. Sch. II; Ngurum . M. Sambo, Pri. Sch. I; Ngurum . M. Sambo, Pri. Sch. II; Tela Baidu Bumsa, Tela B. Gate
Gulani	Dokshi	Doshi, Pri. Sch. / Dokshi Primary School I; Doshi, Pri. Sch. / Dokshi Primary School II; Dokshi Market; Garin Jauro, Jauro Adamu; Mann M. Yakudi Open Space; Zango Kaljiwa Zango Market; Zango Kaljiwa M, Idi Gate
Gulani	Gabai	Bursari Mai Ung. Gate; Chandam Mainari, Pri. Sch. I; Chandam Mainari, Pri. Sch. II; Gabai Mainyiwa, Pri. Sch.; Kojoli Babba Doki, Musa's Gate; Nainala Kolofa Wami Gate; Nguzoa, Manuwa Musa Gate; Sallare, Audu G. Gate
Gulani	Gagure	Badigo/Badigoro Pri. Sch.; Dantoro, Dantaro Gate; Fishigo, Fishingo Town; Gagure, Pri. Sch.; Garin Yaya A. Bauchi/Ibrahim Gate; Kotum B. Shuaibu, Sale Boduku Gate; Yelwa Garba Alarama I. Gate
Gulani	Garin Tuwo	Garin Tuwo B. Yau, Dan Kaka Gate; Garin Tuwo B Ya'U, M. Haruna Dagore; Garin Tuwo Malaya, Pri. Sch. I; Garin Tuwo Malaya, Pri. Sch. II; Garin Sarikin Noma, M. Moh'D Gate; Janna M. Umaru, M. Umaru Gate; Jauro Adamu, Sarkin Noma Gate
Gulani	Gulani	Gulani Lawanti, Viewing Centre I; Gulani Lawanti, Viewing Centre II; Gulani Lawanti, Opposite. Viewing Centre; Gulani Lawanti, Alh. Kolo Gate; Gulani Lawanti, Gulani Lawanti; Gulani Lawanti, Tsangaya
Gulani	Kushimaga	Awala Fantami, Alh. Ibrahim Gate; Garin M. Garba, M. Garba Gate; Kushi Maga Musa Garba Gate; Kupto Gana, Kupto Gana Gate; Ngelzarma, Ibrahim Tela Gate
Gulani	Njibulwa	Bakki Yayum, Yayum B. B Gate; Galtimari, Tela Abdulkarim Gate; Garin Abdullahi Open Space; Gwaya Dungu, Market Gate; Mabani M. B. Kyari, Alh Sabo Gate; Yaryen M. Goje, Goje Market; Njibulwa B, Hassan. Market Place I; Njibulwa B, Hassan. Market Place II; Njibulwa B, Hassan Pri. Sch.; Yelle Ibrahiim Y. Sale Open Space; Zamfarari G. Tela Halwalis Gate.; Zamfarari Bagardo, Tela Hannali Gate
Gulani	Ruhu	Choka Ammani, Musa Gate; Choka Dalha, Mai Jirgi Gate; G. J Tambai Choka, Choka Market; Ruhu, Mai Ung. Gate; Ruhu, Garin J. M Pri. Sch.; Ruhu J. Halilu, Tinau Gate; Ruhu J. Halilu, M. Saidu Gate; Ruhu Kakat Alh., Makeri Gate
Jakusko	Buduwa / Saminaka	Buduwa Primary School; Buduwa Bore Hole, Kofar Lawan; Dagarawa / G. Babawuro Dagarawa; Fane, Rrijiya Fane; Gurbana K., Bulama; Lamindo Haro, Lamido Haro; Saminaka, Primary School
Jakusko	Dumbari	Ariri/Ariri Gunkai Ariri Pri. Sch.; Bakin Rijiya/Bigarwa, Lamido Bulama Gate; Dadande, Bakin Rijiya; Dumbari Bakin Kasuwa; Garin Baduku, Kofar Bulama; Garin Biye, Kofar Bulama; Garin Ilu, Garin Ilu; G. Magaji G. Alhaji Kofar Bulama; Gasi/L. Harunde/G. Jauro Gasi K. Bulama; Gujarma Tuduniya Open Space; Gumalawa, Gumalawa; Katangana, K. Bulama; Katangana, Pri. Sch.; Lamido Gari, K. Bulama; Ndakwarel/Garin Goje Kofar Mai Gari
Jakusko	Gidgid / Bayam	Bayam, Kofar Lawan; Bayam, Pri. Sch.; Doro, Kofar Bulama; Dodori A., Umar Dodori; Gamari, Kofar Bulama; Gamboje Adamu, Rijiya Adamu; Girgir Bore Hole Open Space; Girgir Kofar Lawan; Korso/Garin Biri. Garin Biri; Lafiyari, Pri. Sch.; Lamido Maigari Kolewa/Rijiya Lamido; Malam Dogo Kofar Bulama; Ngajaje, Kofar Bulama; Lamido Manu, Kofar Lamido; Yauru, Kofar Bulama
Jakusko	Gogaram	Adiya, Kofar Bulama; Damasa, Kofar Bulama; Gorgoram, District Office; Gwayo, Kofar Lawan; Gwayo Primary School; Guzumbana/Kajuma, Kofar Bulama; Kurkushe, Kofar Lawan; Kurkushe Dispensary; Tasga Kofar Lawan
Jakusko	Jaba	Jaba/Gure. Harunde Jaba Pri. Sch.; Jaba/Gure H. Kofar Bulama; Garin Maji/ Dan Takunne Garin Maji; Garin M. Jaji/Gumus Kofra Bulama; Ngelsome Ngelsome Open Space
Jakusko	Jakusko	Dakido, Primary School; Jakusko Health Centre, Health Centre; Jakusko Health Centre, Bore Hole; Jakusko, Dispensary; Jakusko, Mai Ung, Dan Atta; Jakusko Viewing Centre; Mai Unguwa Danata Open Space
Jakusko	Jawur/Katamma	Agana, Kofar Lawan; Agana, Pri. Sch.; Arfane, Kofar Bulama; Gafala/Bulturi. Gafala Kofar Bulama; Garin Malam / Jali'A, Pri. Sch.; Gasamu, Bakin Kasuwa; Guyik, Kofar Bulama; Jawur Malaika Pri School; Kagamu Bakin Kasuwa Open Space; Lamarbago Kofar Bulama; Katamma Primary School; Maizango/G. Galadima. Maizango; Nginufumari/Kajuwa Nginufumari K. Bulama; Tajuwa, Pri. Sch.; Tarja, Kofar Bulama
Jakusko	Lafiya Loi-Loi	Gada/Azadu Pri School; Garin Gwanna Kofar Bulama; Gamajan, Kofar Maigari; Gamajan, Bakin Kasuwa; Garin Gano/Kunjim. Gari Gano; Gauya, Bakin Rijiya; Jammel Kubau Bakin Rijiya; Lafiya, Bakin Kasuwa; Lamido Barde/L. Hodi. Bakin Rijiya; Lamido Kwalle, Bakin Rijiya; Marcha Ari, Kofar Bulama; Ngulgiye, Kofar Lamido
Jakusko	Muguram	Dagayak, Dagayak; Garin Tsalha / Mamare Garin Tsalha; Muguram, Pri. Sch.; Muguram K/ Mai Gari; Muguram West, Bakin Kasuwa; Nasari, Nasari
Jakusko	Zabudum / Dachia	Amshi Kofar Lawan; Amshi Primary School; Dachia Kofar Lawan; Dachia Primary School; Dachia / Dispensary II; Dagilwa / Kofar Bulama; Karage / Kofar Lawan; Karage Pri School; Kunu / Kofar Bulama; Kazir / Kofar Bulama; Yin / Primary School; Zabudum / Kofar Lawan
Karasawa	Bukarti	Biridi, Biridi; Bukarti, Bukarti Market; Bukarti, Bukarti Viewing Centre; Gawo Lawnabe, Pri. Sch.; Hututu. Hututu, Kofar Maigari; Karau Kawu, Karau Kawu; Maina Aridi, Maina Aridi; Malam Kunu, Pri. Sch.; Tatukori, Kofar Maigari; Zoro, Kofar Maigari
Karasawa	Fajiganari	Askinari, Askinari Kofar Mai Gari; Dagirari, Kofar Maigari; Fajiganari Pri. Sch.; Garin Amadu, Kofar Maigari; Garin Geda, Kofar Maigari; Kilbuwa, Kofar Maigari; Munemari, Kofar Maigari; Tutukori, Maigari Isa
Karasawa	Garin Gawo	Alhajiri, Kofar Maigari; Buddum, Kofar Maigari; Chulumbuta, Kofar Maigari; Garin Gawo, Pri. Sch.; Ngibulwa, Kofar Maigari; Tashan Kalgo, Kofar Maigari
Karasawa	Gasma	Gadan Dinya, Kofar Maigari; Garin Amadu, Kofar Maigari; Garin Hassan, Kofar Maigari; Garin Mainau Kofar Mai Gari; Gasma Lawanti, Kofar Lawan; Gasma Ung. Musa, Kofar Maiung. Musa; Tabawa, Pri Sch.; Tarchari, Kofar Maigari; Zango, Zango Kanwa Open Space
Karasawa	Jaji Maji	Anuguwar Marami, Kofar Mai Ung.; Bula Kachallam, Dandali; Chakama, Kofar Maiunguwa; Garin Jirma, Kofar Maigari; Jaji Maji Bulamari - Kofar Mai Anguwa; Jaji Maji - Primary School; Jajeri, Kofar Maiunguwa; Mallaika, Kofar Maiunguwa; Mai Lauri, Kofar Maiunguwa; Ngiledu, Kofar Maiunguwa; Ngibutuwa, Kofar Maiunguwa; Shafura, Abasha Kofar Unguwa; Tsangaya, Kofar Mai Ung.
Karasawa	Karasuwa Galu	Chumbusko, Kofar Maigari; Dogon Daji, Kofar Maigari; Garin Atta, Kofar Maigari; Garin Mella Kofar Mai Gari; Garin Goni Yahaya Kofar Mai Gari; Karasuwa Galu, Kofar Kawan; Karasuwa Galu, Primary School; Rumfar Kara, Kofa Maigari
Karasawa	Karauswa Garu Guna	Garin Umar Abaridi Kofar Mai Gari; Aliti Lamido Audu Open Space; Biridi, Kofar Maigari; Borogel Garin Mammo K/Mai Gari; Dalari, Kofar Maigari; Fulatari Abuja, Abuja Kofar Maigari; Fulatari Hardo Kabo, Kofar Mai Hardo Kabo; Fulatari G. Mammadu, Kofar Mammadu; Garin Jarma, Lawanti; Garun Guna, Kofar Maigari; Garin Alh Hassan Kofar Mai Gari; Hardo D. O. Kinnariram Open Space; Karasuwa Mai Kasuwa, Pri. Sch.; Kafetowa, Bakin Inji.; Kafetowa, Kofar Maigari; Lamido Ngaine; Madu Gabari, Kofar Maigari; Magarari Bukku Kofar Mai Gari; Mami Ram, Kofar Maigari; Memeji Simeldi Open Space; Ngerere, Bakin Kasuwa; Tekuri Mastafari Open Space
Karasawa	Wachakal	Wachakal Dala, Kofar Maigari; Wachakal Dala, Pri. Sch.; Wachakal Dala, Dispensary
Karasawa	Waro	Karau Kawu, Kofar Maigari; Lamido Hassan Kofar Mai Gari; Mainari Kafi Kofar Mai Gari; Waro Ngamfatuwa Kofar Lawan; Zaunari, Kofar Maigari
Karasawa	Yajiri	Ballewa, Kofar Maigari; Bula Ngibiya, Kofar Maigari; Bularafi, Kofar Maigari; Damamini, Kofar Maigari; Gremadi, Kofar Maigari; Isari Kofar Mai Gari; Jajeri, Pri. Sch.; Nojari, Kofar Maigari
Machina	Bogo	Bulliti Kofar Mai Gari; Bogo, Pri. Sch. II; Bogo Kasuwa Bole Hore; Garanda Gana, Bakin Inji; Karmashe, Bakin Ingi; Kunshini, Bakin Ingi; Ferni Gana, Bakin Ingi
Machina	Damai	Bulliti, Bulliti; Damai, Bakin Kasuwa; Damai, Bakin Inji; Malam Abari. Kura, Kofar Unguwa; Maijalaini, Kofar Maijalalaini; Na'Anturu, Kofar Maigari; Rannu Kuka, Kofar Maigari
Machina	Dole	Burdu, Pri. Sch.; Burdumaram, Pri. Sch.; Dole Machina, Pri. Sch.; Dole Machina, Bakin Tashi; Kagumsuwa, Pri. Sch.; Kasatchi, Rijiya I; Kortoni, Rijiya II
Machina	Falimaram	Abari Adambe; Falimaram, Pri. Sch.; Garin Haru Kofar Mai Gari; Kalgidi, Primary School; Kandira, Kofar Bulama; Mai Sirdi - Kofar Bulama; Shehuri, Shehuri Kura Open Space
Machina	Kom-Komma	Garin Mallam Nuhu, K/Mai Gari; Garin Mallam Nuhu, Kofar Maiunguwa; Gojogoro, Bakin Rijiya; Komkomma, Kofar Bulama; Tauna / Kofar Mai Gari; Kusotoko, Kofar Maigari
Machina	Kuka-Yasku	Shehuri, Shehuri Kura Open Space; Garin Isa Kofar Bulama; Kuka Yasku, Pri. Sch.; Kuka Yasku, Kofar Kasuwa; Mammada Garin Kambar Open Space; Majeri, Majeri Open Space
Machina	Lamisu	Garanda, Pri. Sch.; Gogi Barmadi / Jajeri, Pri. Sch.; Kabaru, Kabaru Pri School; Kabuduwa, Kofar Maigari; Lamisu, Pri. Sch. I; Lamisu, Pri. Sch. II
Machina	Machina-Kwari	Machina Kori Pri School; Machina Kasuwa, Bakin Kasuwa; Machina Kofar Inji, Kofar Inji; Machina Viewing Centre; Mafidu Kofar Mai Gari; Machina Central, Pri. Sch.; Machina Tasha, Kofar Tasha
Machina	Maskandare	Ghana Dumjiya, Pri. Sch. I; Ghana Dumjiya, Pri. Sch. II; Kangarwa, Bore Hore; Maskandare, Pri. Sch.; Yalauwa Pri School
Machina	Taganama	Mallam Gambo, Kofar Bulama; Injibulwa Kofar Mai Gari; Taganama, Taganama Bore Hole; Taganama, Bakin Tsha; Wuriwaji Bulama Gate 'I'; Wuriwaji Bulama Gate 'II'
Nangere	Chilariye	Chillariye, Kofar Mai. Ang; Chillariye, Pri. Sch.; Garin Jado, Kofar Maigari; Garin Tozo, Pri. Sch.; Garin Kaduwa, Kofar Maigari
Nangere	Dadiso / Chukuriwa	Ajim, Kofar Maigari; Chukuriwa Ung Bulama, Kofar Maigari; Chukuriwa Ung Audu, Pri. Sch.; Chukuriwa Tsangaya Open Space; Chukuriwa, Pri. Sch.; Dadiso I, Kofar Maigari; Dadiso II, Kofar Maigari; G/Zanna Goje, Pri. Sch.; Garin Zanna, Kofar Maigari; Garin Kolo, Kofar Maigari; Tarajim/G. D Dispensary; Tarajim, Kofar Maigari
Nangere	Dawasa/G. Baba	Babban Tsangaya I, Babban Tsangaya; Babban Tsangaya II, Babban Tsangaya; Dawasa, Pri. Sch.; Dawasa Ung. Moh'D, Kofar Maigari 'D; Degunde, Kofar Maigari; Garin Babah I, Kofar Maigari; Garin Babah II, Kofar Maigari; Garin Babah, Kofar Maigari; Kadama Yayu I, Kadama; Kadama Yayu II, Kofar Maigari; Kadama Yayu III,. Kofar Maigari; Kambiya K., Mai Ung.; Kambiya/Watinani, Kofar Mai Unguwa; Lanjido/G. Zango, Kofar Maigari; Unguwar Haruna, Kofar Maigari; Ung. Gambo, Kofar Maigari; Kukuri Unguwan Chiroma Open Space
Nangere	Dazigau	Chatta/Dambam I, Kofar Maigari; Chatta/Dambam II, Kofar Maigari; Dazigau I, Pri. Sch; Dazigau II, Clinic; Garin M. Audu, Kofar Maigari; Gabarun, Kofar Maigari; Kukar Awu I/II, Kofar Maigari; Lelewari, Kofar Maigari; Sabon Layi I / II G. Tozo/S. Layi; Yaru, Kofar Maigari
Nangere	Degubi	Challino I, Kofar Maigari; Challino II, Pri. Sch.; Degubi I, Pri. Sch.; Degubi II, Pri. Sch.; Degubi III, Dispensary; Gabur, Kofar Maigari
Nangere	Kukuri/Chiromari	Alhajeni I, Kofar Maigari; Alhajeri II, Kofar Maigari; Bulturi, Kofar Maigari; Chiromari I, Vet. Clinic; Chiromari II, Pri. Sch.; Garin Kadai I, Kofar Maigari; Garin Kadai II, Kofar Maigari; Garin Alhaji, Kofar Maigari; Gwala Sabuwa, Kofar Maigari; Garin Kariya, Kofar Maigari; Garin Musa, Kofar Maigari; Hana Kashi, Kofar Maigari; Karan Kasuwa, Kofar Maigari; Kwalliboro, Kofar Maigari; Kukuri Ung. Chiroma, Clinic; Kukuri Ung. Chiroma, Pri. Sch. I; Kukuri Ung. Chiroma, Pri. Sch. II; Ung. Maji Dadi, Kofar Maigari; Yemei / Beti, Kofar Maigari
Nangere	Langawa / Darin	Darin Shira, Kofar Maigari I; Darin Shira, Kofar Maigari II; Dorawa, Kofar Maigari; Dagare I, Pri. Sch.; Dagare II, Kofar Maigari; Dorawa / Langawa, Kofar Maigari; Fadawa, Pri. Sch.; Langawa, Kofar Maigari
Nangere	Nangere	Garin Jata, Pri. Sch. I; Garin Jata, Pri. Sch. II; Gamarun Yerima, Kofar Maigari; Gamarun Lamido Hassan, Kofar Maigari; Garin Kuku, Kofar Maigari; Garin Daura, Kofar Maigari; Nangere. Unguwar Sarki, Kudu Pri. Sch. I; Nangere. Unguwar Sarki Kudu, Pri. Sch. II; Nangere Bakin Kasuwa, Bakin Kasuwa; Nangere Fulani, Kofar Maigari; Sabon Gari, Kofar Maiunguwa; Sabon Gari, Court; Sabon Gari, Bakin Kasuwa; Ung. Mal Garba, Kofar Mai Ung.; Ung. Dan Disa, Kofar Mai Ung.
Nangere	Pakarau Kare-Kare/ Pakarau Fulani	Alhaji Adamu, Kofar Maigari; Biriri I, Pri. Sch.; Borno Kichi,. Pri. Sch.; Biriri II, Pri. Sch.; Borno Kichi, Kofar Maigari; Barwawa, Kofar Maigari; Duddaye, Wawa I / Kofar Maigari; Duddaye, Wawa II Kofar Maigari; Duddaye I, Kofar Maigari; Duddaye II, Kofar Maigari; Dallari, Kofar Maigari; Garin Mamman Tar, Kofar Maigari; Garin Gabakan, Hardo Tonari; Garin Sule Babba, Kofar Maigari; Garin Makera / Open Space; Garin Chiroma / Pri. Sch.; Kagadama Kujam / Kofar Mai Gari; Ngabal / Kofar Ma Gari; Pakarau Tsoho / Kofar Mai Gari; Shambawal / G. Fulani / Kofar Mai Gari
Nangere	Tikau	Buraman, Kofar Maigari; Dagazirwa I, Kofar Maigari; Dagazirwa II, Kofar Maigari; Gara Ganya I, K. K, Pri. Sch.; Gara Ganya II, F., Pri. Sch.; Jakade I, Fulani, Kofar Maigari; Jakade II, K. K, Kofar Maigari; Kael, Kofar Maigari I; Kael, Kofar Maigari II; Shebuwa, Pri. Sch. I; Shebuwa, Pri. Sch. II; Tikau, Pri. Sch.; Tikau, Kofar Maigari.; Tudun Wada, Kofar Maigari; Tikau/Dagare/Fulani, Kofar Maigari; Zaga Met, Kofar Maigari
Nangere	Watinani	Baran Iya, Kofar Maigari; Dadin Fulani, Kofar Maigari; Deba. Deba, Pri. Sch.; Garin Gambo I / Kofar Maigari; Garin Baye/Dugum Kofar Mai Gari; Gawa Kubbai, Kofar Maigari; Kanum, Kofar Maigari; Nzada/Gabar Kofar Maigari; Watnani I., Pri. Sch.; Watnani II., Pri. Sch.
Nguru	Bulabulin	Alh Domo, Kofar Domo; Ya'U Mai Atace Open Space; Ali Gaji Mai Photo Open Space; Gidan Dawaki, Viewing Centre; Goriba Kofar B. B. K; Kofar Bukar Makanike, Kofar Bukar Mai Makanike; Kofar Lawan Girgiri, Kofar Lawan Girgiri; Najume Kofar Najume; Kofar Wagani, Kofar Wagani; Kofar Zubairu Farin Massalaci; Yanchiyawa Open Space
Nguru	Bulanguwa	Bulangawa Pri School; Bulanguwa, Dispensary; Bilallam Hausawa Kofar Akilu; Bizizi/Gollike. K. Umaru; Gamu/Golgole. K. Bulama; Mallam Baba Tola. K., Mallam Tata; Rigar Lamido Baidai. K., Mallam Tata.; Wadai Badema K. Duguma
Nguru	Dabule	Bagamari, Kofar Maigari; Dabule, Kofar Habu; Malawari Kofar Bulama; Mojogolam Lawanti Kofar Lawanti; Zaji Ruwa, Kofar Maigari
Nguru	Dumsai/Dogon-Kuka	Dumsai, Pri. Sch I; Dumsai Primary School II; Garin Mallam Dogon Kuka; Kachallari/Bisari; Yamdugu, Yamdugo Kofar Bulama; Kuble Kachallari, Kofar Kachalla
Nguru	Garbi/Bambori	Bombori, Pri. Sch.; Bombori K. Maji, Kofar Kachalla; Dabar Alhaji Giwa, Kofar Alhaji Usman; Ngarbi, Viewing Centre; Rail Ways, Rail Way Primary School
Nguru	Kanuri	Bagena Jajuwa Open Space; Central Primary School; Central, Primary School; Goni Yusuf Kofar Goni; Kadawa, Pri. Sch.; Kofar Hajja Hadiza, Kofar Hajja Hadiza Kuji; Kofar Mai Umar, Kofar Mai Umar; Kuka Da Tsamiya
Nguru	Maja-Kura	Birnin Guru Open Space; Bosso, Kofar M. Mohammed; Bosso, Pri. Sch.; Garene, Kofar M. Gaji; Garin M. Ibrahim, Kofar M. Ibrahim; Hadari, Pri. Sch.; Kakori Kofar Malam Kalle; Maja Kura Pri School
Nguru	Mirba-Kabir/Mirba Sagir	Afunori, Pri. Sch.; Dagarari Kofar Hassan Mahauci; Dagarari, Kofar Hassan Amauchi; Dumar Manga, Pri. Sch.; Kurnawa Barde, Kofar Barde; Karambare, Kofar Babukar; Zomana Kofar Mai Gari; Malam Baba Kofar Malam Baba; Malam Babu Kofar Magaji; Mai Dashi K. Barde, Kofar Barde; Mirba Kabir, Kofar Wakil
Nguru	Nglaiwa	Algazaru, Kofar Al-Gazaru; Duriyar Kuka Open Space; Kofar Lawan Ngoma, Nglaiwa Pri. Sch.; Kofar Liman Juma'A, Kofar Liman Juma'A; Kofar Khalifa, Kofar Khalifa; Ahmadu Kofar Mai Unguwa Ahmadu; Anguwa Buda Kofar Mai Anguwa Badu; Mai Ung. Budu, Kofar Mai Ung. Buda; Modo Mai Gini Kofar Modo Mai Gini; Mai Ung. Karam, Kofar Mai Ung. Karam; Sabon Garin Kanuri, Sabon Garin Kanuri Primary School; Sani Borno, Kofar Sani Borno
Potiskum	Bare-Bare/Bauya/Lalai Dumbulwa	Bulama B. Dalhu Kofar Bulama; Bunduri Open Space; Chadi, Chadi Pri. Sch; Dumbulwa, Kofar Bulama; F. G. G. C, Sch. Gate; Garin Maina, Kofar Bulama; Jigawa Open Space; Kantin Waje Open Space; Kila Kwata Open Space; Lailai, Lailai Pri. Sch.; Lamba Sule, Kofar Lamba; Mai Bauya Kofar Bulama; Makabarta Kofar Mai Unguwa; M. Iyam, Kofar M. Iyam; Masaka Open Space; Mazagam, Mazagam Pri. Sch.; Nahuta, Nahuta Pri. Sch.; Prison, Nigeria Prison; Rest House, Reception; Sarkin Dilalai, S. Dilalai; Tsangaya Open Space; Unguwar Arewa, Ung. Arewa; Unguwar Makafi - Ung. Makafi I; Unguwar Makafi - Ung. Makafi II; Yusuf Kafinta Open Space
Potiskum	Bolewa 'A'	Yalamoi / Amadi, Kofar Amadi; Chiroma Kafinta, Kofar Chiroma; Gindin Rimi, Gindin Rimi; Gumsa Kure Open Space; Kara, Pri. Sch. I; Kara, Pri. Sch. II; Kofar Sarki, Permanent Stand; Lamba Babafi, Kofar Lamba; Masallacin Jumma'A; M. Moh'D Bomoi Line, Moh'D Bomoi; Nepa Transformer; Sabon Gari, Pri. Sch.; Tela Baburo, Kofar Tela; Unguwar Lebura, Ung. Lebura; Unguwar Alkali, Kofar Alikali I; Unguwar Alkali, Kofar Alikali II
Potiskum	Bolewa 'B'	Bayi Moi Open Space; Bulama Ari, Kofar Bulama; Dahiru Lanzai, Kofar Dahiru Lanzai; Dogo Zare Open Space; Jankwano Open Space; Kasuwan N. P. N, Kasuwan N. P. N; Kofar Isa Jajere, Kofar Isa Jajere; Kwata, Kwata Pri. Sch. I; Kwata, Kwata Pri. Sch. II; Low Cost, Gidin Gawo; Sabon Layi, Pri. Sch. I; Sabon Layi, Pri. Sch. II; Tashar Lamba Sabo, Kofar Lamba; Tashar Mai. Kaji, Kofar Mai Kaji; T. Junction, T. Junction I; T. Junction, T. Junction II; Tela Bamado, Kofar Bamado; Zango Alhazai, Zango
Potiskum	Danchuwa/Bula	Bubaram Bataba, Kofar Bulama I; Bubaram Bataba, Kofar Bulama II; Bubaram Gakoku, Pri. Sch. I; Bubaram Gakoku, Pri. Sch. II; Danchuwa, Dispensary; Danchuwa. K. Lamba, Kofar Lamba; Dukunde, Kofar Bulama; Garin Abba. A., Pri. Sch.; Garin Abba, Dispensary; Garin Bah, Kofar Bulama I; Garin Bah, Kofar Bulama II; Garin Makwai, Pri. Sch.; Garin Makwai S. Noma, Kofar Maigari; Gamawa, Pri. Sch.; Garin Chichi, Kofar Bulama; Jumma'A, Pri. Sch.; Jumma'A., Kofar Bulama I; Jumma'A., Kofar Bulama II; Tela Yahaya, Kofar Tela Yahaya; Unguwar Galadima, Kofar Galadima; Unguwar Wakili, Kofar Wakili; Unguwar Yerima, Kofar Yarima; Yabel, Kofar Bulama
Potiskum	Dogo Nini	Arewa Da Kasuwa, Kofar Hassan; Ari Kime . A., Pri. Sch.; Ari Kemi A. A. Kofar Dogo Mai Kemi; Ari Kime A. A., Kofar Abare; Arewa Da Kasuwa 'B', Arewa Da Kasuwa; Dabo Stadium, Stadium Gate I; Dabo Stadium, Stadium Gate II; Dabo Stadium, Maternity Clinic; Dauda 'A', Kofar Dauda; Dauda 'B', Kofar Dauda; Dogo Mission, Kofar Dogo Mission; Dorowa, Dorowa Tsamiya; F. C. E Technical; Gabar Da Kasuwa, Gabar Da Kasuwa; Ya'U Tudun Wada, Kofar Ya'U; Yindiski A Kofar Lamba; Yindiski B Kofar Lamba
Potiskum	Dogo Tebo	Balarabe, Kofar Balarabe I; Balarabe, Kofar Balarabe II; Damboa, Pri. Sch.; Hammawa, Kofar Hammawa; Lamba Dogo, Kofar Lamba; Makera Kasuwa Open Space; Mai Ung Manu I. Kofar Isa Daya; Mai Ung Manu II Kofar Mai Unguwa; M. Inuwa, Kofar M. Inuwa; M. Shaibu, Kofar Shaibu; Sherif Aji, Kofar Sherif Aji
Potiskum	Hausawa	Abbas Shehu, Kofar Abbas Shehu; Dan Bera, Kofar Dan Bera; Dorowa, Pri. Sch.; Hospital, Hospital Gate; Idi Baba, Kofar Idin Baba; Idi Saleh, Kofar Saleh; Makera, Makera Cinema; Madagali Kofar Lamba Madagali; Sheik Saidu, Kofar Sheik Saidu; Tsohuwar Kasuwa, Tsohuwar Kasuwa; Walabiya Kofar Lamba Walabiya; Wanzam, Kofar Wanzam
Potiskum	Mamudo	Adaya K / Kofar Bulama; Garin Bingel, Pri. Sch.; Garin Maje, Pri. Sch. I; Garin Maje, Pri. Sch. II; Gumbak Kudu, Kofar Bulama; Mamudo Dispensary, Dispensary; Mamudo, Pri. Sch. I; Mamudo, Pri. Sch. II; Mamudo, Pri. Sch. III; Zagam, Kofar Bulama
Potiskum	Ngojin/Alaraba	Alaraba I, Kofar Lamba; Alaraba II, Pri. Sch.; Arjali, Kofar Bulama; Badejo, Kofar Bulama; Dakasku I, Dispensary; Dakasku II, Pri. Sch.; Farafara, Pri. Sch.; Ganda - Fura, Kofar Bulama; Kaka Bijik, Kofar Bulama; Lamfade, Kofar Bulama; Lokoya, Kofar Bulama; Mai Jarma, Pri. Sch.; Ngojin, Pri. Sch; Teduwa, Kofar Bulama
Potiskum	Yerimaram/Garin Daye/Badejo/Nahuta	Army Barrack, Pri. Sch.; Badejo, Pri. Sch.; Garin Gaye, Kofar Bulama; Gishuwa Dabuwa, Kofar Bulama; G. G. S. S Potiskum; Nasarawa, Kofar Bulama; Socol, Kofar Kori; Texaco, Kofar Bulama; Tike I, Tiken Shanu; Tike A Kofar Mai Unguwa; Yerimaram Kofar Bulama
Tarmuwa	Babangida	Andrashi Open Space; Babbangida I, Babbangida Pri. Sch.; Babbangida II, Babbangida Pri. Sch.; Babbangida, Dispensary; Babbangida F. S. P, F. S. P. Office I; Babbangida F. S. P, F. S. P. Office II; Babbangida Viewing Centre, Viewing Centre I; Babbangida Viewing Centre, Viewing Centre II; Damewa Open Space; Namegilam Open Space
Tarmuwa	Barkami / Bulturi	Barkami, Barkami Kofar Lawan; Goduram I ., Goduram Lawanti; Goduram II ., Goduram Dispensary; Shuwari Lawanti Open Space; Zaramiri Lawanti Open Space
Tarmuwa	Biriri/Churokusko	Biriri Kofar Waziri I; Biriri, Pri. Sch. II; Churokusko I, Pri. Sch.; Churokusko II, Pri. Sch.; Garaji, Garaji Kofar Buluma; Tashan Fulai, Tashan Fulani
Tarmuwa	Jumbam	Jumbam I, Pri. Sch.; Jumbam Sarkin Pawa; Jumbam Maternity; Korosori, Korosori Open Space; Mattari, Pri. Sch.; Meleri, Kasuwa
Tarmuwa	Koka/Sungul	Koka, Koka Open Space; Malum Musari Open Space; Sungul Open Space; Yaga Open Space
Tarmuwa	Koriyel	Garga, Pri. Sch.; Kailo Open Space; Koriyel I., Pri. Sch.; Koriyel II., Pri. Sch.; Ngabobi Open Space; Yangeberi Open Space
Tarmuwa	Lantaiwa	Kariyari Pri School; Lantewa Pri School; Simintiya Open Space
Tarmuwa	Mandadawa	Dandali, Askwari Open Space; Koligotel, Open Space; Koromari Bulin, Open Space; Mada'Ada Pri School; Mada'Ada Pri School II
Tarmuwa	Shekau	Kiji Nguduwa Open Space; Shekau I, Pri. Sch.; Shekau Pri School
Yunusari	Bultuwa/Mar/Yaro	Bultuwa Dandali; Garin Gada, Pri. Sch.; Gremari Marte, Dandali; Luram,. Dandali; Mashio, Dandali; Yaro Lawanti, Pri. Sch.; Zaye, Dandali
Yunusari	Daratoshia	Abba Kimeri, Dandali; Dagalam, Dandali; Dara, Dandali; Gadauri, Dandali; Goni Ahmadu, Dandali; Kilbu Kime, Dandali; Toshia, Pri. Sch.; Wanganga, Dandali; Toshia, Dandali
Yunusari	Degaltura/Ngamzai	Birnin Chiroma, Pri. Sch.; Birnin Kolori, Dandali; Buhari, Pri. Sch.; Bula Bulin, Pri. Sch.; Degeltura Lawanti, Pri. Sch.; Gremari, Dandali; Kadauri, Dandali; Lambure, Dandali; Mala Abduri, Dandali; Ngamzai Lawanti, Pri. Sch.
Yunusari	Dekwa	Bulangunwari, Dandali; Dekwa, Pri. Sch.; Guluri Malanti, Dandali; Kafetowa, Dandali; Mainari, Dandali; Mar - Gawa Pri School
Yunusari	Dilala/Kalgi	Alafaksa, Dandali; Bukar Midi, Dandali; Dilala Lawanti Pri School; Fulameri, Dandali; Jajiri, Dandali; Kalgi Lawanti, Pri. Sch.; Kantu Kolowa, Dandali; Yawule, Dandali
Yunusari	Mozogun/Kujari	Alhajiri Malari, Dandali; Dama, Dandali; Gadauri, Dandali; Kujari, Dispensary; Kujari, Dandali; Malla Asandi, Dandali; Mozogun, Pri. Sch.; Ufari, Dandali
Yunusari	Ngirabo	Abubakar Maiung, Dandali I; Abubakar Maiung, Dandali II; Bula Melah, Dandali; Bula Malam Gana, Dandali; Dalari, Dandali; Garin Gawo, Dandali; Gremari Ngirabo, Dandali; Jagar Adimi, Dandali; Mani Kilbu, Dandali; Sarkin Pawa, Dandali I; Sarkin Pawa Dandali II; Shettima Moduri, Dandali I; Shettima Moduri, Dandali II; Yerimaram, Dandali; Zigindimi, Pri. Sch.; Gremari Ngirago, Dandali
Yunusari	Wadi/Kafiya	Bukarti, Pri. Sch.; Chukuwa Kura, Dandali; Gabtomeri, Dandali; Gamachiri, Dandali; Goni Meleri, Dandali; Goni Chammami Openspace; Gremari Wadi, Pri. Sch.; Kafiya, Dandali; Kirizul, Dandali; Kusuluwaram, Dandali; Manawaji, Pri. Sch.; Manawaji, Dispensary
Yunusari	Zajibiri / Dumbal	Awakimeri, Dandali; Bulanguwaram, Dandali; Dumbol Lawanti, Dandali I; Dumbol Lawanti, Dandali II; Garau, Dandali; Musa Kallabe, Dandali; Zai Lawanti, Dandali; Zaji Biriri Lawanti, Dandali; Zaji Biriri Ladu, Pri. Sch.
Yusufari	Alanjirori	Bula Tura, Pri. Sch.; Bula Tura, Bulama Gate; Kachallari, Pri. Sch.; Kelumeri Open Space; Leferi Open Space; Ngalbiya, Defunt Pri. School; Njererewa Open Space; Sherifudi, Sherifudi; Siniri, Bulama Gate; Sunomari Open Space; Zaifadari, Bulama's Gate
Yusufari	Gumshi	Garin Kallah Open Space; Gumshi Open Space; Kerewa Maya Open Space; Kore Maram Open Space; Mai Dashi Open Space; Ngeijabe Open Space; Tsengumeri Open Space
Yusufari	Guya	Awanari Open Space; Bula Daube, Bulama's Gate; Guya Dispensary; Guya, Guya Kasuwa; Guya Mari, Wakil Gate; Guya Mari, Defunt Pri. Sch.; Kaluwa Open Space; Maibogori; Nganawa Open Space; Zumugu Open Space
Yusufari	Jebuwa	Abatseremi, Bulama's Gate; Abatseremi, Wakil Gate; Alarakchi, Bulama's Gate; Bamusu Open Space; Fantameri Open Space; Gabachari Open Space; Kaigamari, Bulama's Gate; Ligalidi Open Space; Jebuwa, Pri. Sch. I; Jebuwa, Pri. Sch. II
Yusufari	Kajimaram/Sumbar	Abatura Open Space; Buzizi Open Space; Gremari Open Space; Kadairi Open Space; Kajimaram Open Space; Sumbar Open Space
Yusufari	Kaska/Tulotulowa	Buddum Open Space; Kaska Open Space; Lawan Ganari, Lawan Ganari; Lawan Ganari Open Space; Modibbo Open Space; Tulo, Tulo Open Space I; Tulo, Tulo Open Space II
Yusufari	Kumagannam	Bonegaral Open Space; Dunari Open Space; Gakore, Bulama's Gate; Garin Idi Open Space; Kumagannam I, G. S. S; Kumagannam II, Behind G. S. S; Mainewa Open Space; Massasara I Open Space; Massasara II Open Space
Yusufari	Mai-Malari	Bukku Kura Open Space; Bula Zaji Open Space; Dussare Open Space; Kirigini Open Space; Lawanti Open Space; Maimalari, Pri. Sch. I; Maimalari, Pri. Sch. II
Yusufari	Mayori	Aba Tura Mayori Open Space; Garin A. Amadu Open Space; Garin Jibir Open Space; Garin Tsangai Open Space; Mayori, Health Clinic; Mayori, Primary School; Mayori Lawanti Open Space; Sumbar Mayori Open Space; Isakari Bulin, Kofar Isaka; Ziginomi Open Space
Yusufari	Yusufari	Adult. Edu. Office, Adult. Edu Office; Lawanti Pri. Sch.; Area Court Office, Behind The Court; Area Court, Area Court; Bulama Modu, Bulama Gate; Chingide, Bulama Gate; Chingiwa, Bulama Gate; Kiriram, Bulama Gate; Kuka Tatawa, Bulama Gate; Ung. Zangomanga. Veterinary Clinic; Yusufari, Pri. Sch.; Yusufari, Behind Pri. Sch.
