= 2023 Nigerian Senate elections in Yobe State =

2023 Senate elections in Yobe

← 2019	25 February 2023	2027 →

All 3 Yobe State seats in the Senate of Nigeria
	Majority party
Party	APC
Last election	3
Seats before	3
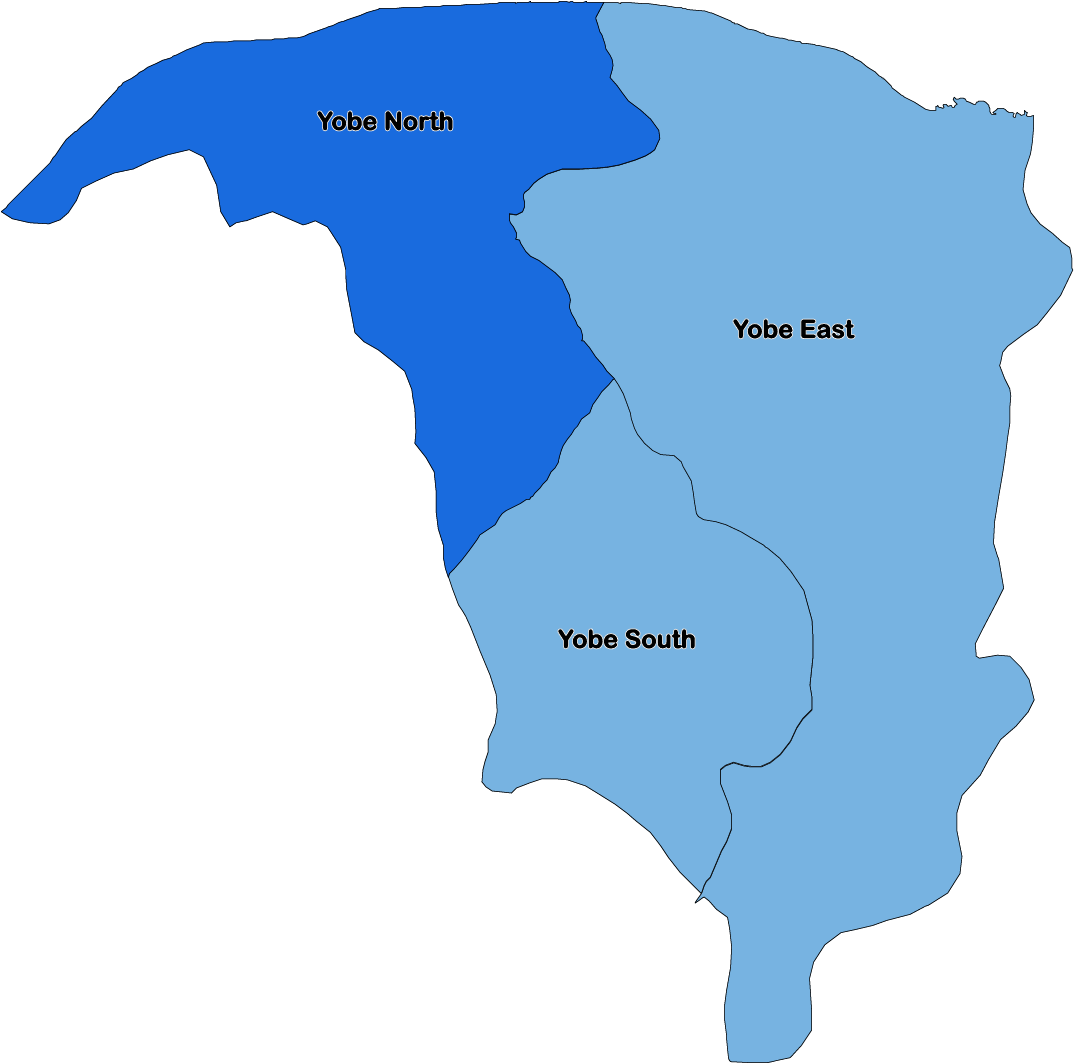
- APC incumbent retiring or lost renomination APC incumbent running for re-election

The 2023 Nigerian Senate elections in Yobe State will be held on 25 February 2023, to elect the 3 federal Senators from Yobe State, one from each of the state's three senatorial districts. The elections will coincide with the 2023 presidential election, as well as other elections to the Senate and elections to the House of Representatives; with state elections being held two weeks later. Primaries were held between 4 April and 9 June 2022.

== Background ==
In the previous Senate elections, only one of the three incumbent senators was returned with Bukar Ibrahim (APC-East) retiring while Mohammed Hassan (PDP-South) was unseated in the general election. In the South district election, Ibrahim Mohammed Bomai (APC) defeated Hassan with 56% of the vote while Ibrahim Gaidam held the East district for the APC with 88%. In the East district, Ahmad Lawan (APC) won re-election with just 72% of the vote. The senatorial results were a continuation of APC control in the state as the party also gained won all House of Representatives seats, won a majority in the House of Assembly, and won the gubernatorial election along with Buhari winning the state in the presidential election.

== Overview ==
Affiliation	Party	Total
Affiliation	APC	Total
Previous Election	3	3
Before Election	3	3
After Election	TBD	3

== Summary ==
District	Incumbent		Results	
District	Incumbent	Party	Status	Candidates
Yobe East	Ibrahim Gaidam	APC	Incumbent re-elected	▌ ✓ Ibrahim Gaidam (APC); ▌Aji Kolomi (PDP)
Yobe North	Ahmad Lawan	APC	Incumbent re-elected	▌ ✓ Ahmad Lawan (APC); ▌Ilu Bello (PDP)
Yobe South	Ibrahim Mohammed Bomai	APC	Incumbent re-elected	▌ ✓ Ibrahim Mohammed Bomai (APC); ▌Halilu Abubakar Mazagane (PDP)

== Yobe East ==
2023 Yobe East Senatorial District election
← 2019	25 February 2023	2027 →
Nominee	Ibrahim Gaidam	Aji Kolomi
Party	APC	PDP
Senator before election
Ibrahim Gaidam
APC
Elected Senator
TBD

The Yobe East Senatorial District covers the local government areas of Bursari, Geidam, Gujba, Gulani, Tarmuwa, and Yunusari. Incumbent Ibrahim Gaidam (APC), who was elected with 88.2% of the vote in 2019, is seeking re-election.

=== General election ===
==== Results ====
2023 Yobe East Senatorial District election
Party	Candidate	Votes	%
AA	Mustapha Tela		
ADC	Inuwa Ali		
APC	Ibrahim Gaidam		
New Nigeria Peoples Party	Baba Mohammed Dapchi		
PDP	Aji Kolomi		
SDP	Ali Abubakdar		
YPP	Muktar Mohamed		
Total votes			100.00%
Invalid or blank votes			N/A
Turnout			

== Yobe North ==
2023 Yobe North Senatorial District election
← 2019	25 February 2023	2027 →
Nominee	Ahmad Lawan	Ilu Bello
Party	APC	PDP
Senator before election
Ahmad Lawan
APC
Elected Senator
TBD

The Yobe North Senatorial District covers the local government areas of Bade, Jakusko, Karasuwa, Machina, Nguru, and Yusufari. Incumbent Ahmad Lawan (APC), who was elected with 72.5% of the vote in 2019, is seeking re-election.

=== General election ===
==== Results ====
2023 Yobe North Senatorial District election
Party	Candidate	Votes	%
ADC	Alhaji Bunu Sherif		
APC	TBD		
New Nigeria Peoples Party	Garba Hamza Daiyabu		
PDP	Ilu Bello		
Total votes			100.00%
Invalid or blank votes			N/A
Turnout			

== Yobe South ==
2023 Yobe South Senatorial District election
← 2019	25 February 2023	2027 →
Nominee	Ibrahim Mohammed Bomai	Halilu Abubakar Mazagane
Party	APC	PDP
Senator before election
Ibrahim Mohammed Bomai
APC
Elected Senator
TBD

The Yobe South Senatorial District covers the local government areas of Damaturu, Fika, Fune, Nangere, and Potiskum. Incumbent Ibrahim Mohammed Bomai (APC), who was elected with 56.5% of the vote in 2019, is seeking re-election.

=== General election ===
==== Results ====
2023 Yobe South Senatorial District election
Party	Candidate	Votes	%
ADC	Adamu Yarima Adamu		
APC	Ibrahim Mohammed Bomai		
LP	Ishaku Habila Jauro		
PRP	Inusa Isa		
PDP	Halilu Abubakar Mazagane		
YPP	Barde Maisambo		
Total votes			100.00%
Invalid or blank votes			N/A
Turnout			

== See also ==
- 2023 Nigerian Senate election
- 2023 Nigerian elections
- 2023 Yobe State elections
