= Nigerian National Assembly delegation from Yobe =

Yobe's delegation in Nigeria's National Assembly

The Nigerian National Assembly delegation from Yobe comprises three Senators representing Yobe North, Yobe South, Yobe East and six Representatives representing Gulani/Gujba/Damaturu/Tarmuwa, Bursari/Geidam/Yunusari, Fika/Fune, Nangere/Potiskum, Bade/Jakusko, and Yusufari/Nguru/Machina/Karasuwa. Constituencies are based on Local Government Area boundaries.

== Fourth Republic ==
=== The 10th Assembly (2023–2027) ===
Senator	Party	Constituency
Ahmed Ibrahim Lawan	APC	Yobe North
Ibrahim Mohammed Bomai	APC	Yobe South
Ibrahim Gaidam	APC	Yobe East
Representative	Party	Constituency
Tijjani Zannah Zakariya	APC	Machina/Nguru/Karasuwa/Yusufari
Muhammad Buba Jajere	PDP	Fika/Fune
Lawan Shettima Ali	APC	Bursari/Geidam/Yunusari
Khadija Bukar Abba Ibrahim	APC	Damatura/Gujba/Gulani/Tarmuwa
Fatima Talba	APC	Nangere/Potiskum
Hassan Ibnjaks	PDP	Bade/Jakusko

=== The 8th Assembly (2015 – date) ===
Senator	Party	Constituency
Ahmed Ibrahim Lawan	APC	Yobe North
Muhammed Hassan	PDP	Yobe South
Bukar Abba Ibrahim	APC	Yobe East

=== The 7th Assembly (2011–2015) ===
Senator	Party	Constituency
Ahmed Ibrahim Lawan	ANPP	Yobe North
Alkali Abdulkadir Jajere	ANPP	Yobe South
Bukar Abba Ibrahim	ANPP	Yobe East
Representative	Party	Constituency
Baba Bukar Machinama	ANPP	Machina/Nguru/Karasuwa/Yusufari
Ismail Ahmad Gadaka	ANPP	Fika/Fune
Goni Bukar Haruna	ANPP	Bursari/Geidam/Yunusari
Khadija Bukar Abba Ibrahim	ANPP	Damatura/Gujba/Gulani/Tarmuwa
Ali Yakubu Mainasara	APC	Nangere/Potiskum
Hassan K Badawy	ANPP	Bade/Jakusko

=== The 6th Assembly (2007–2011) ===
Senator	Party	Constituency
Ahmed Ibrahim Lawan	ANPP	Yobe North
Adamu Garba Talba	PDP	Yobe South
Bukar Abba Ibrahim	ANPP	Yobe East
Representative	Party	Constituency
Baba Bukar Machinama	ANPP	Machina/Nguru/Karasuwa/Yusufari
Baba Gishiwari	ANPP	Fika/Fune
Goni Bukar Lawan	ANPP	Bursari/Geidam/Yunusari
Khadija Bukar Abba Ibrahim	ANPP	Damatura/Gujba/Gulani/Tarmuwa
Lawan Mohammed Kori	PDP	Nangere/Potiskum
Zakari Yau Galadima	ANPP	Bade/Jakusko

=== The 5th Assembly (2003–2007) ===
Senator	Party	Constituency
Usman Adamu	ANPP	Yobe North
Mamman Bello Ali	ANPP	Yobe South
Usman Albishir	ANPP	Yobe East

=== The 4th Assembly (1999–2003) ===
Senator	Party	Constituency
Albishir Usman	ANPP	Yobe North
Mamman Bello Ali	ANPP	Yobe South
Goni Modu Zanna Bura	PDP	Yobe East
Representative	Party	Constituency
Babale Jibrin	PDP	Gulani/Gujba/Damaturu/Tarmuwa
Geidam Almajir	ANPP	Bursari/Geidam/Yunusari
Isiyaku Suleiman	PDP	Fika/Fune
Jonga Hassan	ANPP	Nangere/Pootiskum
Lawan AhmadIbrahim	ANPP	Bade/Jakusko
Shugaba Bello	ANPP	Yusufari/Nguru/Machina/Karasuwa
