= 2023 Nigerian presidential election in Yobe State =

- 25 February 2023
- Registered: 1,485,146
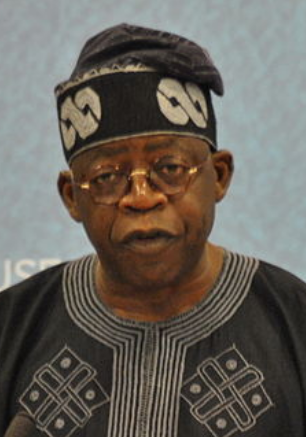

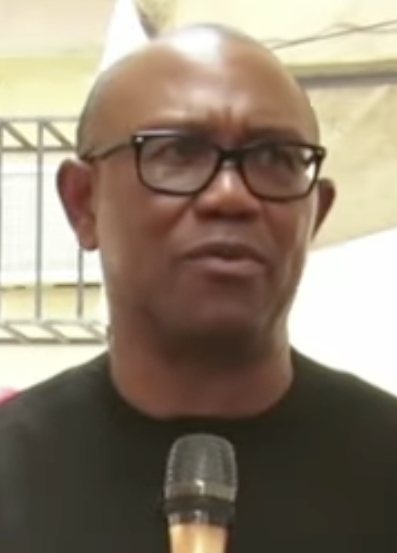

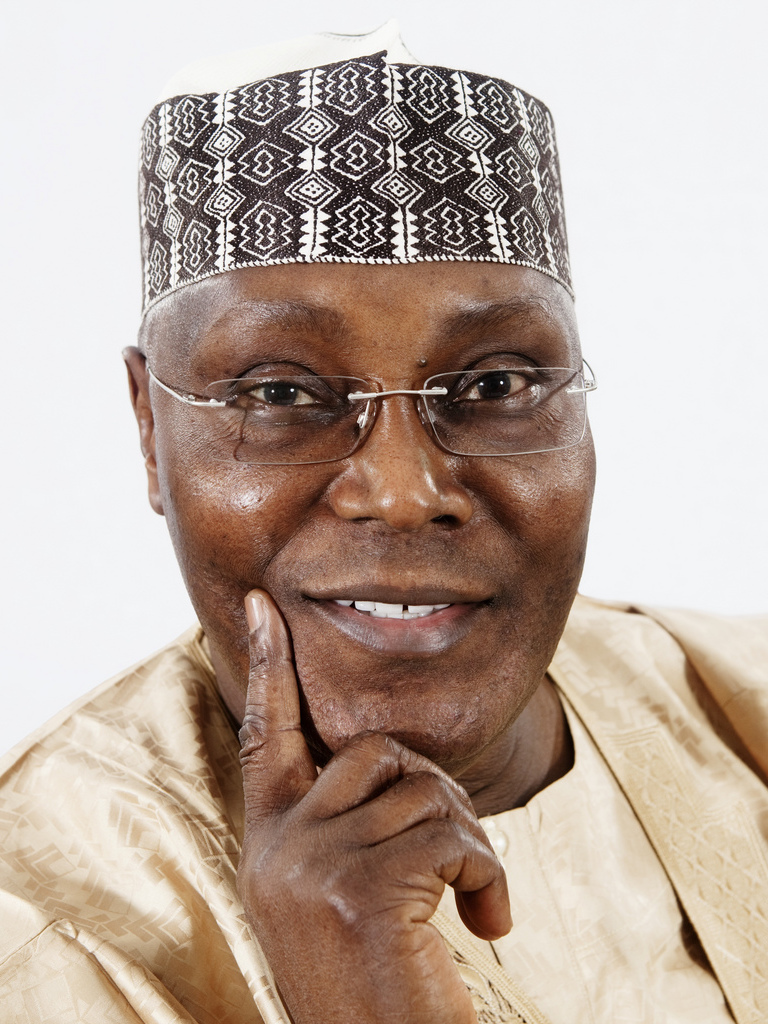
Nominee	Bola Tinubu	Peter Obi
Party	APC	LP
Home state	Lagos	Anambra
Running mate	Kashim Shettima	Yusuf Datti Baba-Ahmed
Nominee	Rabiu Kwankwaso	Atiku Abubakar
Party	New Nigeria Peoples Party	PDP
Home state	Kano	Adamawa
Running mate	Isaac Idahosa	Ifeanyi Okowa
President before election
Muhammadu Buhari
APC
Elected President
TBD

The 2023 Nigerian presidential election in Yobe State will be held on 25 February 2023 as part of the nationwide 2023 Nigerian presidential election to elect the president and vice president of Nigeria. Other federal elections, including elections to the House of Representatives and the Senate, will also be held on the same date while state elections will be held two weeks afterward on 11 March.

== Background ==
Yobe State is a large, diverse northeastern state in the process of recovering from the worst of the Boko Haram insurgency. Still facing threats from Boko Haram and ISWAP, the state also has to contend with an underdeveloped yet vital agricultural sector, desertification, and low education rates.

Politically, the 2019 elections confirmed Yobe's status as one of the most staunchly APC states in the nation as both Buhari and Buni won the state by wide margins and every single legislative seat on the senatorial, house of representatives, and house of assembly levels were carried by APC nominees.

== Polling ==
Polling organisation/client	Fieldwork date	Sample size					Others	Undecided	Undisclosed	Not voting
Polling organisation/client	Fieldwork date	Sample size	Tinubu APC	Obi LP	Kwankwaso NNPP	Abubakar PDP	Others	Undecided	Undisclosed	Not voting
BantuPage	January 2023	N/A	30%	3%	6%	48%	–	9%	0%	3%
Nextier (Yobe crosstabs of national poll)	27 January 2023	N/A	46.9%	6.1%	10.2%	32.7%	–	4.1%	–	–
SBM Intelligence for EiE (Yobe crosstabs of national poll)	22 January-6 February 2023	N/A	27%	6%	3%	26%	–	37%	–	–

== Projections ==
Source	Projection		As of
Africa Elects (Note: Africa Elects projections predict the likelihood of a candidate winning a state by categorizing a state as "Safe" for exceedingly likely, "Likely" for somewhat likely, and "Lean" for least likely. If no clear determination could be made, states are categorized as "tossups".)	Likely Tinubu		24 February 2023
Dataphyte (Note: Dataphyte projections predict candidates' projected votal shares in each state.)
Dataphyte	Tinubu:	46.69%	11 February 2023
Dataphyte	Obi:	3.62%	11 February 2023
Dataphyte	Abubakar:	46.69%	11 February 2023
Dataphyte	Others:	3.00%	11 February 2023
Enough is Enough- SBM Intelligence (Note: EiE-SBM projections predict which candidates will win states.)	Abubakar		17 February 2023
SBM Intelligence (Note: SBM projections predict which candidates will win states or, if no determination could be made, categorizes states as "Too close to call" (TCC).)	Tinubu		15 December 2022
ThisDay (Note: ThisDay projections predict candidates' projected votal shares in each state.)
ThisDay	Tinubu:	40%	27 December 2022
ThisDay	Obi:	–	27 December 2022
ThisDay	Kwankwaso:	15%	27 December 2022
ThisDay	Abubakar:	30%	27 December 2022
ThisDay	Others/Undecided:	15%	27 December 2022
The Nation (Note: The Nation projections predict which candidates will win states or, if no determination could be made, categorizes states as "Battlegrounds.")	Tinubu		12-19 February 2023

== General election ==
=== Results ===
2023 Nigerian presidential election in Yobe State
Party	Candidate	Votes	%
A	Christopher Imumolen		
AA	Hamza al-Mustapha		
ADP	Yabagi Sani		
APP	Osita Nnadi		
AAC	Omoyele Sowore		
ADC	Dumebi Kachikwu		
APC	Bola Tinubu		
APGA	Peter Umeadi		
APM	Princess Chichi Ojei		
BP	Sunday Adenuga		
LP	Peter Obi		
NRM	Felix Johnson Osakwe		
New Nigeria Peoples Party	Rabiu Kwankwaso		
PRP	Kola Abiola		
PDP	Atiku Abubakar		
SDP	Adewole Adebayo		
YPP	Malik Ado-Ibrahim		
ZLP	Dan Nwanyanwu		
Total votes			100.00%
Invalid or blank votes			N/A
Turnout			

==== By senatorial district ====
The results of the election by senatorial district.

Senatorial District	Bola Tinubu APC		Atiku Abubakar PDP		Peter Obi LP		Rabiu Kwankwaso NNPP		Others		Total valid votes
Senatorial District	Votes	%	Votes	%	Votes	%	Votes	%	Votes	%	Total valid votes
Yobe East Senatorial District (Note: Comprising the local government areas of Bursari, Geidam, Gujba, Gulani, Tarmuwa, and Yunusari.)	TBD	%	TBD	%	TBD	%	TBD	%	TBD	%	TBD
Yobe North Senatorial District (Note: Comprising the local government areas of Bade, Jakusko, Karasuwa, Machina, Nguru, and Yusufari.)	TBD	%	TBD	%	TBD	%	TBD	%	TBD	%	TBD
Yobe South Senatorial District (Note: Comprising the local government areas of Damaturu, Fika, Fune, Nangere, and Potiskum.)	TBD	%	TBD	%	TBD	%	TBD	%	TBD	%	TBD
Totals	TBD	%	TBD	%	TBD	%	TBD	%	TBD	%	TBD

==== By federal constituency ====
The results of the election by federal constituency.

Federal Constituency	Bola Tinubu APC		Atiku Abubakar PDP		Peter Obi LP		Rabiu Kwankwaso NNPP		Others		Total valid votes
Federal Constituency	Votes	%	Votes	%	Votes	%	Votes	%	Votes	%	Total valid votes
Bade/Jakusko Federal Constituency (Note: Comprising the local government areas of Bade and Jakusko.)	TBD	%	TBD	%	TBD	%	TBD	%	TBD	%	TBD
Bursari/Geidam/Yunusari Federal Constituency (Note: Comprising the local government areas of Bursari, Geidam, and Yunusari.)	TBD	%	TBD	%	TBD	%	TBD	%	TBD	%	TBD
Damaturu/Gujba/Gulani/Tarmuwa Federal Constituency (Note: Comprising the local government areas of Damaturu, Gujba, Gulani, and Tarmuwa.)	TBD	%	TBD	%	TBD	%	TBD	%	TBD	%	TBD
Fika/Fune Federal Constituency (Note: Comprising the local government areas of Fika and Fune.)	TBD	%	TBD	%	TBD	%	TBD	%	TBD	%	TBD
Machina/Nguru/Yusufari/Karasuwa Federal Constituency (Note: Comprising the local government areas of Karasuwa, Machina, Nguru, and Yusufari.)	TBD	%	TBD	%	TBD	%	TBD	%	TBD	%	TBD
Nangere/Potiskum Federal Constituency (Note: Comprising the local government areas of Nangere and Potiskum.)	TBD	%	TBD	%	TBD	%	TBD	%	TBD	%	TBD
Totals	TBD	%	TBD	%	TBD	%	TBD	%	TBD	%	TBD

==== By local government area ====
The results of the election by local government area.

Local government area	Bola Tinubu APC		Atiku Abubakar PDP		Peter Obi LP		Rabiu Kwankwaso NNPP		Others		Total valid votes	Turnout (%)
Local government area	Votes	%	Votes	%	Votes	%	Votes	%	Votes	%	Total valid votes	Turnout (%)
Bade	TBD	%	TBD	%	TBD	%	TBD	%	TBD	%	TBD	%
Bursari	TBD	%	TBD	%	TBD	%	TBD	%	TBD	%	TBD	%
Damaturu	TBD	%	TBD	%	TBD	%	TBD	%	TBD	%	TBD	%
Fika	TBD	%	TBD	%	TBD	%	TBD	%	TBD	%	TBD	%
Fune	TBD	%	TBD	%	TBD	%	TBD	%	TBD	%	TBD	%
Geidam	TBD	%	TBD	%	TBD	%	TBD	%	TBD	%	TBD	%
Gujba	TBD	%	TBD	%	TBD	%	TBD	%	TBD	%	TBD	%
Gulani	TBD	%	TBD	%	TBD	%	TBD	%	TBD	%	TBD	%
Jakusko	TBD	%	TBD	%	TBD	%	TBD	%	TBD	%	TBD	%
Karasuwa	TBD	%	TBD	%	TBD	%	TBD	%	TBD	%	TBD	%
Machina	TBD	%	TBD	%	TBD	%	TBD	%	TBD	%	TBD	%
Nangere	TBD	%	TBD	%	TBD	%	TBD	%	TBD	%	TBD	%
Nguru	TBD	%	TBD	%	TBD	%	TBD	%	TBD	%	TBD	%
Potiskum	TBD	%	TBD	%	TBD	%	TBD	%	TBD	%	TBD	%
Tarmuwa	TBD	%	TBD	%	TBD	%	TBD	%	TBD	%	TBD	%
Yunusari	TBD	%	TBD	%	TBD	%	TBD	%	TBD	%	TBD	%
Yusufari	TBD	%	TBD	%	TBD	%	TBD	%	TBD	%	TBD	%
Totals	TBD	%	TBD	%	TBD	%	TBD	%	TBD	%	TBD	%

== See also ==
- 2023 Nigerian elections
- 2023 Nigerian presidential election
