= 2019 Yobe State gubernatorial election =

2019 gubernatorial election in Yobe State, Nigeria

- March 9, 2019
		PDP
Nominee	Mai Mala Buni	Umar Iliya Damagum
Party	APC	PDP
Running mate	Idi Barde Gubana	Baba Abba Aji
Popular vote	444,013	95,703
Percentage	81.26%	17.52%
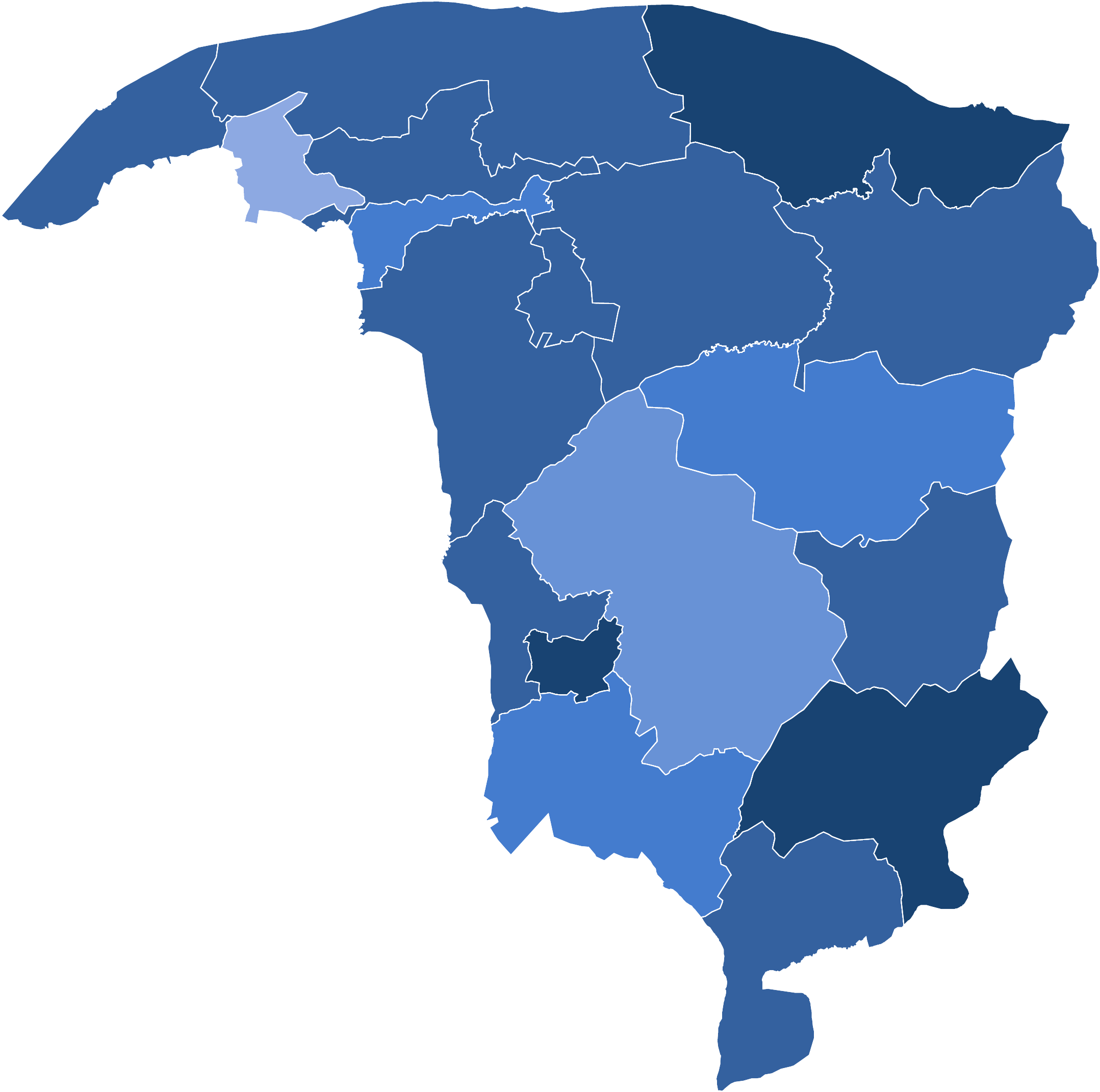
- LGA results Buni: 50–60% 60–70% 70–80% 80–90% >90%
Governor before election
Ibrahim Gaidam
APC
Elected Governor
Mai Mala Buni
APC

The 2019 Yobe State gubernatorial election occurred on March 9, 2019, the APC nominee Mai Mala Buni won the election, defeating Umar Iliya Damagum of the PDP.

Mai Mala Buni emerged APC gubernatorial candidate after scoring 2,797 votes and defeating his closest rival, Sidi Karasuwa who received 23 votes. He picked Idi Barde Gubana as his running mate. Umar Iliya Damagum was the PDP candidate with Baba Abba Aji as his running mate. 13 candidates contested in the election.

== Electoral system ==
The Governor of Yobe State is elected using the plurality voting system.

== Primary election ==
=== APC primary ===
The APC primary election was held on September 30, 2018. Mai Mala Buni won the primary election polling 2,797 votes against 3 other candidates. His closest rival was Sidi Karasuwa, who came second with 23 votes, Umar Ali came third with 8 votes, while Aji Kolo had 4 votes.

=== Candidates ===
- Party nominee: Mai Mala Buni
- Running mate: Idi Barde Gubana
- Sidi Karasuwa
- Aji Kolo

=== PDP primary ===
The PDP primary election was held on September 30, 2018. Umar Iliya Damagum emerged as the consensus candidate after his closest rival was Umar Elgash Maina withdrew.

=== Candidates ===
- Party nominee: Umar Iliya Damagum
- Running mate: Baba Abba Aji
- Umar Elgash Maina- Withdrew

== Results ==
A total number of 13 candidates registered with the Independent National Electoral Commission to contest in the election.

The total number of registered voters in the state was 1,365,913, while 546,391 voters were accredited. Total number of votes cast was 560,492, while number of valid votes was 546,391. Rejected votes were 14,101.

Candidate	Party	Votes	%
Mai Mala Buni	All Progressives Congress	444,013	81.26
Umar Iliya Damagum	People's Democratic Party	95,703	17.52
Other candidates		6,675	1.22
Total		546,391	100.00
Valid votes		546,391	97.48
Invalid/blank votes		14,101	2.52
Total votes		560,492	100.00
Registered voters/turnout		1,365,913	41.03
Source: DailyTrust

=== By local government area ===
Here are the results of the election by local government area for the two major parties. The total valid votes of 546,391 represents the 13 political parties that participated in the election. Blue represents LGAs won by Mai Mala Buni. Green represents LGAs won by Umar Iliya Damagum.

LGA	Mai Mala Buni APC		Umar Iliya Damagum PDP		Total votes
LGA	#	%	#	%	#
Damaturu	26,087		3,760		
Geidam	18,724		2,760		
Nguru	28,366		19,468		
Bade	32,213		8,854		
Yunusari	28,858		893		
Karasuwa	24,262		2,762		
Yusufari	22,221		2,964		
Potiskum	54,773		5,114		
Fune	36,040		14,327		
Jakusko	30,828		5,887		
Bursari	20,657		2,813		
Gulani	21,765		4,576		
Fika	36,519		9,552		
Machina	16,950		2,164		
Nangere	25,698		4,765		
Tarmuwa	11,338		3,925		
Gujba	17,714		1,119		
Totals	444,013		95,703		546,391
