= Jakduwa Kaikaku =

Nigerian politician

Federal Representative
- Constituency: Bade/Jakusko

Personal details
- Party: Peoples Democratic Party (Nigeria)
- Occupation: Politician

Jakduwa Hassan Kaikaku is a Nigerian politician. He is currently serving as a member representing Bade/Jakusko Federal Constituency of Yobe State in the 10th National Assembly under the platform of the Peoples Democratic Party (PDP).
