= Khadija Abba Ibrahim =

Nigerian politician (born 1967)

Khadija Bukar Abba Ibrahim

Member of the House of Representative from Yobe State
- Incumbent
- Assumed office 12 June 2019
- Preceded by: Abdullahi Kukuwa
- Constituency: Damaturu; Gujba; Gulani; Tarmuwa

Minister of State for Foreign Affairs
- In office November 2015 – 9 January 2019
- Preceded by: Nurudeen Mohammed
- Succeeded by: Zubairu Dada

Member of the House of Representative from Yobe State
- In office 12 June 2007 – October 2015
- Preceded by: Zanna Laisu
- Succeeded by: Abdullahi Kukuwa
- Constituency: Damaturu; Gujba; Gulani; Tarmuwa

Personal details
- Born: 6 January 1967 (age 59)
- Party: All Progressives Congress (APC)
- Spouse: Bukar Abba Ibrahim
- Parent: Waziri Ibrahim (father)
- Education: University of Surrey

Khadija Bukar Abba Ibrahim (born 6 January 1967) is a Nigerian representative of Damaturu, Gujba, Gulani, and Tarmuwa constituencies in Yobe State. A member of the All Progressives Congress (APC), she was appointed Minister of State for Foreign Affairs by President Muhammadu Buhari in 2016.

In October 2018, she defeated her step son to clinch the ticket of her party to run for Federal House of Representatives. On 9 January 2019, Abba Ibrahim announced her resignation from the federal cabinet to focus on her campaign for Federal House of Representatives seat for her Constituency which she won. Khadija Ibrahim is married to senator Bukar Abba Ibrahim a former governor of Yobe State and former senator.

== Life ==
She was born to the family of Waziri Ibrahim and attended Kaduna Capital School, Kaduna, Nigeria between 1972 and 1977. In 1978, she began her secondary school education at Queen's College, Lagos. In 1980, she proceeded to Headington School, Oxford, where she completed her secondary school education in 1983. In 1986, Abba Ibrahim obtained her National Diploma in Business and Finance from Padworth College, Reading, UK. In 1989, she received her B.Sc. degree in Business Studies and Sociology from Roehampton Institute for Higher Education, an affiliate of the University of Surrey.

=== Professional career ===
Shortly before she graduated from the university in 1989, she worked with Abbey National Building Temple Fortune, North Finchley, UK, where she was involved in buying and selling of properties and handling Mortgage accounts of respective clients. In 1991, she worked briefly with Hatton Cross Heathrow, UK as a Public Relations Officer. Her responsibilities included getting clients to use the freight services of the company to export to the Middle East and Asia. She left the same year to join Kaguin Nigeria Limited as a Marketing Officer. She was responsible for marketing grains and petroleum products in the ECOWAS region. In 1992, she was appointed Manager, OURS Insurance Brokerage, a firm that deals with private and government accounts. Having garnered enough experience, Abba Ibrahim established her own firm, ZAFACA Nigeria Limited, in 1996. She worked as the CEO/Managing Director from inception till 2004.

=== Political career ===
In 2004, she was appointed Commissioner for Transport and Energy, Yobe State. Her primary responsibility was overseeing the energy supply in rural areas and transport networks in the State. In 2006, she was appointed Resident Commissioner, Nicon Insurance, Yobe State. In 2016, she was appointed as the Minister of State for Foreign Affairs by President Muhammadu Buhari.

She was a three-time member of the House of Representatives, representing Damaturu, Gujba, Gulani and Tarmuwa Federal Constituency of Yobe State. She was first elected in 2007 and was re-elected in 2011 and 2015. In 2019 she was re-elected to a fourth term in the House of Representatives. While in the House of Representative, she served in different capacities. From 2007 to 2008, she was the deputy chairman, House Committee on Rural Development; between 2008 and 2010, she was the deputy chairman, House Committee on Communications; from 2010 to 2011, she served as the chairman, House Committee on Rural Privatisation and Commercialisation. She was also a member of House Committees on Power, Water Resources, interior, Women affairs, Appropriation, etc.

In 2019, Abba Ibrahim resigned from her appointment as minister and member of the federal executive council (FEC).

She has received many awards. These include, Thisday Woman Distinction Award, 2012, Sir Abubakar Tafawa Balewa Inspirational Leadership Forum (SATBILA) Award, 2010, Distinguished Leadership Award by The Rotary Club of Maiduguri City, 2016 among others.
