= General Hospital Geidam =

Hospital in Nigeria

The Specialist Hospital Geidam formerly General Hospital Geidam is a government established hospital located in Geidam, Geidam Local Government Area of Yobe State, Nigeria. It provides medical and health care services to the community.

== Background ==
The Specialist Hospital Geidam was established in 1972 as a General Hospital in Geidam town, the headquarter of Geidam local government of Yobe State. It was upgraded to a Specialist Hospital in 2022.

== Description ==
The Specialist Hospital Geidam was licensed by the Nigeria Ministry of Health with a facility code 35/06/1/2/1/0001 and registered as Secondary Health Care Centre.
