= Kumariya =

Town in Yobe State, Nigeria

Kumariya is a town located in the North-east of Nigeria, specifically in the Bade local government area, Yobe State.
