= Gashua =

Town in Yobe State, Nigeria

- Town
- Gashua shown within Nigeria
- Coordinates: 12°52′5″N 11°2′47″E
- Country: Nigeria
- State: Yobe State
- LGA: Bade
- Elevation: 299 m (981 ft)

Population (2006)
  - Total: 125,100
- Time zone: UTC+1 (CET/WAT)

Gashua is a town in Yobe State in northeastern Nigeria, on the Yobe River a few miles below the convergence of the Hadejia River and the Jama'are River. Average elevation is about 299 m (981 ft). The population in 2006 was about 125,000. The hottest months are March and April with temperature ranges of 38-40^{o} Celsius. In the rainy season, June–September, temperatures fall to 23-28^{o} Celsius, with rainfall of 500 to 1,000 mm (20 to 39 in).

== Town ==
Gashua is one of the largest and most developed towns in Yobe State. Since 1976, it has been headquarters of the Bade Local Government Area. The town lies near the Nguru-Gashua Wetlands, an economically and ecologically important wetland system . The town is the location of the court of Mai Bade, the Emir of Bade.

== Language ==
The Bade language is spoken in Gashua and in an area fanning out east and south of Gashua. Bade is one of seven languages of the Chadic family indigenous to Yobe State.

== Other towns ==
The town of Kumariya is also located in the Gashua area.
