= List of Local Government Areas in Yobe State =

State of Nigeria

Yobe was created on 27 August 1991. It is a mainly agricultural state, and it is a state located in northeastern Nigeria. Yobe State was carved out of Borno State. The capital of Yobe State is Damaturu; its largest and most populated city is Potiskum.

== LGAs ==
Yobe State consists of 17 local government areas (or LGAs). They are:

- Bade
- Bursari
- Damaturu
- Geidam
- Gujba
- Gulani
- Fika
- Fune
- Jakusko
- Karasuwa
- Machina
- Nangere
- Nguru
- Potiskum
- Tarmuwa
- Yunusari
- Yusufari
