= Dapchi =

Border town in Yobe State, Nigeria

Coordinates: 12°30′N 11°30′E

Position of Dapchi in Nigeria.

Dapchi is a town in Yobe State, northeast Nigeria. It is 75 kilometres south of the border with Niger.

== History ==
On 19 February 2018, 110 girls were kidnapped from the Government Science and Technical College in Dapchi by Boko Haram insurgents. On 21 March 2018, 101 of the girls were dropped back to the town.
