= Bursari =

LGA in Yobe State, Nigeria

- Local Government Area
- Interactive map of Bursari
- Location in Nigeria
- Coordinates: 12°45′N 11°46′E
- Country: Nigeria
- State: Yobe State
- Headquarters: Dapchi

Government
  - Local Government Chairman: Zanna Bawa (APC)

Area
  - Total: 3,818 km^{2} (1,474 sq mi)

Population (2006)
  - Total: 109,124
  - Density: 28.58/km^{2} (74.03/sq mi)
- Time zone: UTC+1 (WAT)
- Postal code: 620
- ISO 3166 code: NG.YO.BO

Bursari is a Local Government Area in Yobe State, Nigeria. Its headquarters are in the town of Dapchi in the far south of the area at 12°29′25″N 11°29′40″E.

It has an area of 3,818 km^{2} and a population of 109,124 at the 2006 census.

The postal code of the area is 620.

The Kanuri language is spoken in Bursari LGA.

== Climate ==
Bursari local government area spans 3,818 square kilometres or 1,474 square miles, primarily dry and semi-arid. It has two main seasons: a prolonged, scorching dry season and a rainy season. The average temperature is 34 °C (93 °F), with low humidity at 15 percent. This paints a picture of a hot, arid environment with limited rainfall.

== See also ==
- List of Local Government Areas in Yobe State
