= Nangere =

- Town and LGA
- Interactive map of Nangere
- Location in Nigeria
- Coordinates: 11°51′N 10°58′E
- Country: Nigeria
- State: Yobe State

Government
  - Local Government Chairman: Salisu Yerima (APC)

Area
  - Total: 980 km^{2} (380 sq mi)

Population (2006 census)
  - Total: 87,823
  - Density: 90/km^{2} (230/sq mi)
- Time zone: UTC+1 (WAT)
- 3-digit postal code prefix: 631
- ISO 3166 code: NG.YO.NA

Nangere is a town and Local Government Area in Yobe State, Nigeria.

== Geography of Nangere ==
Nangere LGA occupies a total area of 980 square kilometres or 380 square miles and has an average temperature of 34 °C. The LGA witnesses two major seasons which are the dry and the rainy seasons while the total precipitation in the area is estimated at 890 mm of rainfall per annum.

=== Climate ===
Nangere has a subtropical steppe climate with a yearly average temperature of 30.97 °C, 47.96 millimetres (1.888 inches) of precipitation, and 66.75 rainy days.

== Population ==
It has a total population of 87,823 at the 2006 census.

== Towns and Villages ==
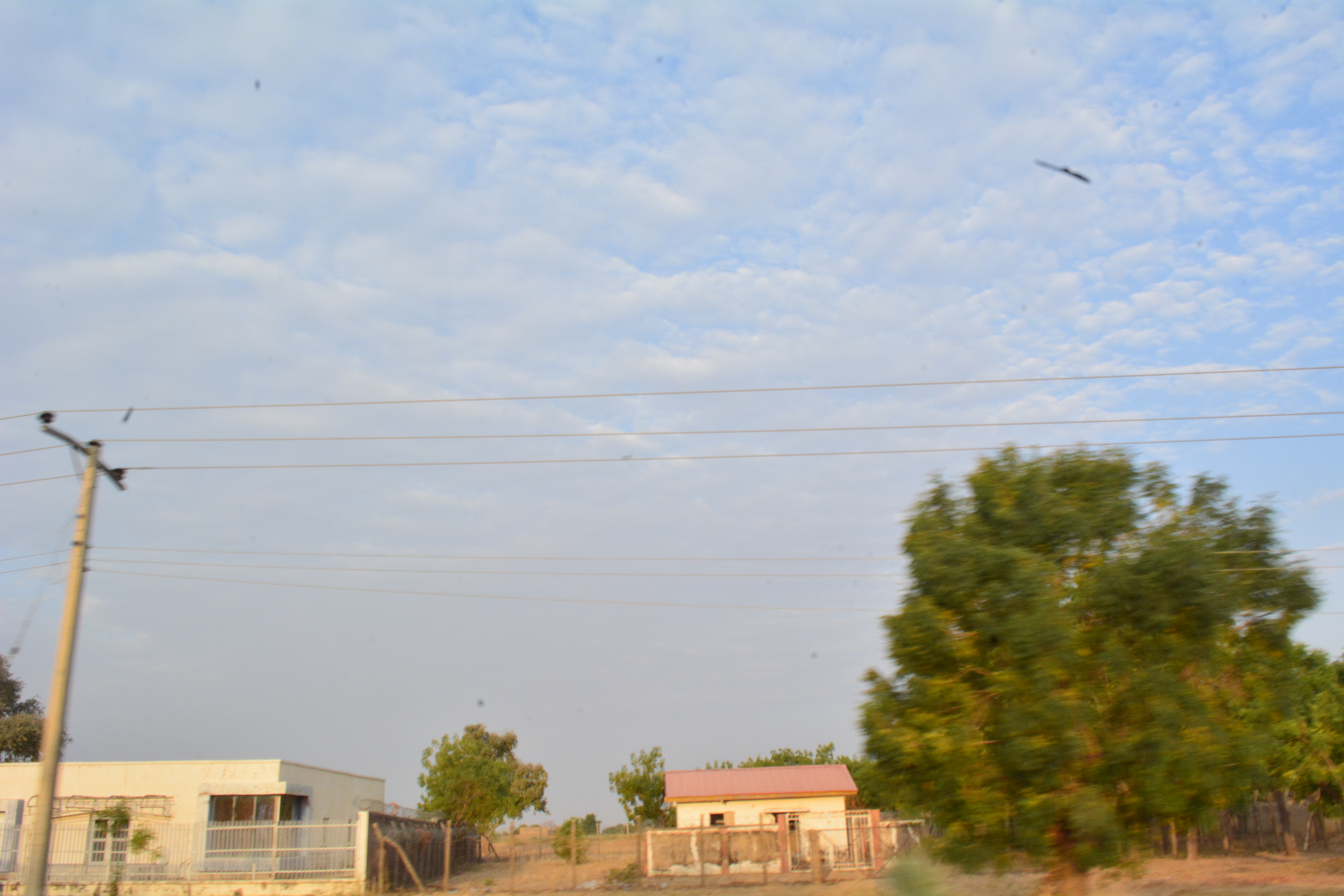
Nangere Town

Other towns and villages that make up Nangere LGA include Dawasa, Tagamasa, Sabon Gari Nangere, Tikau, and Dorowa.

== Economy of Nangere ==
Majority of Nangere inhabitants engage in Agricultural activities. A variety of crops are grown in the LGA while a number of domestic animals are reared and sold in the area. Trade also flourishes in Nangere LGA with the area hosting several markets where a wide variety of commodities are bought and sold. Other important economic activities engaged in by the people of Nangere LGA include hunting, leather works and crafts making.

== Flooding (2024–2025) ==
In 2024 and 2025, Nangere Local Government Area was affected by severe flooding caused by heavy rainfall, which led to the displacement of residents and damage to homes, farmlands, and infrastructure. Several communities, including Garin Kolo, were impacted, with hundreds of households affected. The Yobe State Emergency Management Agency (SEMA) relocated displaced persons to temporary shelters, while relief materials were provided by government and humanitarian agencies such as the North East Development Commission (NEDC). The flooding highlighted the need for improved drainage systems and stronger flood prevention measures in the area.

== See also ==
- List of Local Government Areas in Yobe State
