= Yunusari =

- LGA
- Nickname: Bukarti
- Interactive map of Yunusari
- Location in Nigeria
- Coordinates: 13°07′N 11°44′E
- Country: Nigeria
- State: Yobe State
- Headquarter: Kanama

Government
  - Local Government Chairman: Bukar Gaji (APC)

Area
  - Total: 3,790 km^{2} (1,460 sq mi)

Population (2006 census)
  - Total: 125,821
  - Density: 33.2/km^{2} (86.0/sq mi)
- Time zone: UTC+1 (WAT)
- 3-digit postal code prefix: 632
- ISO 3166 code: NG.YO.YN

Yunusari is a Local Government Area in Yobe State, Nigeria. It has its headquarters in the town of Kanamma (or Kanama) in the north-east of the area on the Burun Gana River at 13°06′15″N 12°04′20″E. It shares a border in the north with The Republic of Niger.

== Landscape ==
It has an area of 3,790 km^{2}

== Population ==
It has a total population of 125,821 at the 2006 census.

== Postal Code ==
The postal code of the area is 632.

== Geography/Climate ==
The overall area of Yunusari Local Government Area is 3790 square kilometres or 1,460 square miles, and its average annual temperature is 33 degrees Celsius or 91.4 degrees Fahrenheit. The Local Government Area's territory is traversed by the well-known Burun Gana River, and local estimates place the area's average relative humidity at 27%.

== Economy ==
Agriculture i.e. production of crops like millet, beans, maize, sorghum, ground nut as well as rearing of animals are the main business of people in the Local Government. The main environmental impacts include wind erosion, desertification, deforestation and so on. The local government faces serious effects of climate change.

== See also ==
- List of Local Government Areas in Yobe State
