= Machina, Nigeria =

Machina
- LGA and town
- Interactive map of Machina
- Location in Nigeria
- Coordinates: 13°06′N 10°00′E
- Country: Nigeria
- State: Yobe State

Government
  - Local Government Chairman: Bukar A. Bukar (APC)

Area
  - Total: 1,213 km^{2} (468 sq mi)

Population (2006 census)
  - Total: 61,606
  - Density: 50.79/km^{2} (131.5/sq mi)
- Time zone: UTC+1 (WAT)
- 3-digit postal code prefix: 630
- ISO 3166 code: NG.YO.MA

Machina (also known as Matsena) is a town and Local Government Area in Yobe State, Nigeria. It shares a border in the north with The Republic of Niger.

It has an area of 1,213 km^{2} and a population of 61,606 at the 2006 census.

The postal code of the area is 630.

The languages spoken in Machina LGA are Kanuri, Fulani, and Hausa

== Climate ==
Temperatures in Machina range from 15 °C (59 °F) to 41 °C (105 °F), rarely dropping below 12 °C (54 °F) or rising above 43 °C (109 °F), and there are hot, miserable, mainly gloomy rainy seasons and blistering, windy dry seasons.

With an average daily high temperature of 38 °C (101 °F), the hot season lasts for 2.5 months, from March 26 to June 12. May, with an average high of 40 °C (104 °F) and low of 28 °C (82 °F), is the hottest month of the year in Machina.

With an average daily high temperature below 32 °C (89 °F), the cool season lasts for 1.8 months, from December 9 to February 2. In Machina, January is the coldest month of the year, with an average low of 16 °C (60 °F) and high of 30 °C (86 °F).

== See also ==
- List of Local Government Areas in Yobe State
