= Karasuwa =

LGA in Yobe State, Nigeria

- Local Government Area
- Interactive map of Karasuwa
- Location in Nigeria
- Coordinates: 13°00′N 10°47′E
- Country: Nigeria
- State: Yobe State
- Headquarters: Jajimaji

Government
  - Local Government Chairman: Lawan Gana (APC)

Area
  - Total: 1,162 km^{2} (449 sq mi)

Population (2006)
  - Total: 106,992
  - Density: 92.08/km^{2} (238.5/sq mi)
- Time zone: UTC+1 (WAT)
- Postal code: 630
- ISO 3166 code: NG.YO.KA

Karasuwa is a Local Government Area in Yobe State, Nigeria. Its headquarters are in the town of Jajimaji on the Hadejia River at 12°53′57″N 10°48′28″E.

It has an area of 1,162 km^{2} and a population of 106,992 at the 2006 census.

== Land Areas ==
Karasuwa local government area consists of larger towns which include: Jajimaji, Bukarti, Kasuwa Sidi, and small villages such as Tsamiyan Gada, etc.

The postal code of the area is 630.

== Cultures and Tribes ==
Basically the people predominantly live in Karasuwa, which is 70 percent Manga tribe, which originated from sub Kanuri tribe. Most residents are farmers, both in towns and villages.

The Bade language is spoken in Karasuwa LGA.

== Climate/Geography ==
The average temperature in Karasuwa LGA is 34 degrees Celsius or 93 degrees Fahrenheit, and the average wind speed is 10 km/h (6.2 mph). The region has two different seasons: the rainy and the dry. The dry season is typically marked by exceptionally high temperatures.

== See also ==
- List of Local Government Areas in Yobe State
