= Fika, Nigeria =

Fika
- LGA and town
- Interactive map of Fika
- Location in Nigeria
- Coordinates: 11°25′N 11°13′E
- Country: Nigeria
- State: Yobe State

Government
  - Local Government Chairman: Halima Kyari Joda (APC)

Area
  - Total: 2,208 km^{2} (853 sq mi)

Population (2006 census)
  - Total: 136,895
  - Density: 62.00/km^{2} (160.6/sq mi)
- Time zone: UTC+1 (WAT)
- 3-digit postal code prefix: 622
- ISO 3166 code: NG.YO.FI

Fika is a town and Local Government Area in Yobe State, Nigeria.

It has an area of 2,852 km^{2}.

The postal code of the area is 622.

== Geography ==
The northeasterly line of equal latitude and longitude passes through the area close to Fika.

Gadaka is also the largest town in the Fika Local Government Area. It is located at about 12 km off the Potiskum-Gombe main road, about 55 km from the commercial city of Potiskum.

== Climate ==
With temperatures ranging from 14 °C (58 °F) to 40 °C (104 °F), Fika has hot, oppressive rainy seasons with predominantly cloudy skies and blistering dry seasons with partially cloudy skies.

From March 5 to May 16, the hot season, with an average daily high temperature exceeding 38 °C (100 °F), lasts for 2.4 months. With an average high of 39 °C (103 °F) and low of 24 °C (76 °F), April is the hottest month of the year in Fika.

From July 15 to October 2, the cool season, which has an average daily high temperature below 32 °C (89 °F), lasts for 2.6 months. With an average low of 14 °C (58 °F) and a high of 33 °C (91 °F), January is the coldest month of the year in Fika.

=== Clouds ===
In Fika, there is a notable seasonal change in the average percentage of cloud cover throughout the year. In Fika, the period of greater clarity starts about November 6 and lasts for 4.0 months, ending about March 5. With 60% of the sky being clear, mostly clear, or partially cloudy on average, January is the clearest month of the year in Fika. About March 5 is when the cloudier portion of the year starts, and it lasts about 8.0 months, finishing around November 6. With 70% of the sky being gloomy or mostly cloudy on average, May is the cloudiest month of the year in Fika.

== List of Districts under Fika ==
1. Daya
2. Fika
3. Gadaka
4. Shembire
5. Gudi
6. Dozi
7. Godo woli
8. Maluri
9. Janga
10. Boza
11. Zangaya
12. Mazawun
13. Mubi
14. Fusami
15. Garin wayo
16. T.nanai
17. Farsawa

== See also ==
- List of Local Government Areas in Yobe State
