= Yusufari =

- LGA and town
- Interactive map of Yusufari
- Location in Nigeria
- Coordinates: 13°11′N 10°51′E
- Country: Nigeria
- State: Yobe State

Government
  - Emir: Muhammad ibn Zannah Zakaria
  - Local Government Chairman: Ba Abba Aji (APC)

Area
  - Total: 3,928 km^{2} (1,517 sq mi)

Population (2006 census)
  - Total: 111,086
  - Density: 28.28/km^{2} (73.25/sq mi)
- Time zone: UTC+1 (WAT)
- 3-digit postal code prefix: 630
- ISO 3166 code: NG.YO.YF

Yusufari is a town and Local Government Area in Yobe State, Nigeria. It shares a border in the north with The Republic of Niger.

It has an area of 3,928 km^{2} and a population of 111,086 at the 2006 census.

The postal code of the area is 630.

== Climate ==
With 482.5 mm (19 in) of precipitation and 67.16 rainy days (18.4%), Yusufari, a district in Nigeria, has a hot semi arid climate (BSh), and has an average annual temperature of 31.16 °C (88.09 °F), which is 1.7% higher than the national average.

== See also ==
- List of Local Government Areas in Yobe State
