= Tarmuwa =

- LGA
- Interactive map of Tarmuwa
- Location in Nigeria
- Coordinates: 12°12′N 11°47′E
- Country: Nigeria
- State: Yobe State
- Headquarter: Babangida

Government
  - Type: Democracy
  - Local Government Chairman: Mohammed Musa Lamido (APC)

Area
  - Total: 4,594 km^{2} (1,774 sq mi)

Population (2006 census)
  - Total: 177,204
  - Density: 38.57/km^{2} (99.90/sq mi)
- Time zone: UTC+1 (WAT)
- 3-digit postal code prefix: 620
- ISO 3166 code: NG.YO.TA

Tarmuwa is a Local Government Area in Yobe State, Nigeria. Its headquarters are in the town of Babangida at 12°06′27″N 11°45′14″E.

It has an area of 4,594 km^{2} and a population of 177,204 at the 2006 census.

The postal code of the area is 620.

Tarmuwa Town is under the leadership of Mashio Kingdom by Jajere Emirate Administration. And Jajere Emirate is situated in the heart of Yobe State. It is surrounded to the north by Bursari Local Gov't, Jakusko Local Gov't to the North West and Damaturu Local Gov't The State Capital. To the South Potiskum and Nangere Local Gov't Area to the West.

Jajere Emirate was created in 1992 by the civilian administration of Governor Bukar Abba Ibrahim (FNIQS). The headquarters was located at Jajere Town but was later dissolved by the Military Administration Compol Dabo Aliyu in 1993. On 6 January 2000 with the return of civilian administration under the leadership of Governor Bukar Abba Ibrahim recreated the present Jajere Emirate comprising: Jajere, Mashio, Shenga, Biriri, Zogoto, Mongono, Muri, Koriyel, Mafa, Sungul and Koka District with headquarters at Babban gida.

The members of the Emirate(King makers) consist of twenty title holders including the Emir. The present Jajere Emirate Council was installed as second class status in 1993 but later it was elevated to first class status in 2005 by the state governor Bukar Abba.

== Geography ==
Tarmuwa Local Government Area covers a land area totaling 4,594 square kilometres or 1,774 square miles. The region maintains an average temperature of around 34°C/93°F. Its topography is characterized by extensive dry and sandy flat lands, sparsely adorned with vegetation. Additionally, the average wind speed in Tarmuwa Local Government Area is recorded at 11 km/h or 6.8 mph.

== Economic ==
Trade holds a significant position within Tarmuwa Local Government Area's economy. The area hosts various markets, including the bustling Mafa market, where a diverse range of goods are traded among numerous buyers and sellers. Furthermore, Tarmuwa Local Government Area is involved in the rearing and sale of animals such as camels, donkeys, and rams. Additionally, the local economy thrives on other essential activities like pottery, mat and basket weaving, as well as blacksmithing.

== See also ==
- List of Local Government Areas in Yobe State
