= Jakusko =

LGA and town in Yobe State, Nigeria

- Town and Local Government Area
- Interactive map of Jakusko
- Location in Nigeria
- Coordinates: 12°25′N 10°56′E
- Country: Nigeria
- State: Yobe State
- Headquarters: Jakusko

Government
  - Local Government Chairman: Umaru Aguwa (APC)

Area
  - Total: 3,941 km^{2} (1,522 sq mi)

Population (2006)
  - Total: 229,083
  - Density: 58.13/km^{2} (150.6/sq mi)
- Time zone: UTC+1 (WAT)
- Postal code: 631

Jakusko is a town and local government area in Yobe State, Nigeria.

It has an area of 3,941 km^{2} and a population of 229,083 at the 2006 census.

The postal code of the area is 631.

The languages spoken in Jakusko LGA are Bade, Fulani, and Karai-kara.

== Climate ==
Temperatures in Jakusko range from 15 °C (59 °F) to 41 °C (105 °F), rarely dipping below 12 °C (53 °F) or rising above 43 °C (109 °F), and are oppressively hot during the rainy and dry seasons.

The hot season lasts for 2.4 months, from March 22 to June 4, with an average daily high temperature of over 38 °C (101 °F). May is the hottest month of the year in Jakusko, with an average high temperature of 39 °C (103 °F) and low temperature of 27 °C (80 °F).

Between December 10 and January 31, which is the length of the chilly season, the daily maximum temperature often falls below 90 degrees Fahrenheit or 32.2 degrees Celsius. With an average low of 16 °C (60 °F) and a high of 31 °C (88 °F), January is the coldest month of the year in Jakusko.

== See also ==
- List of Local Government Areas in Yobe State
