= Gulani =

LGA and town in Yobe State, Nigeria

Gulani NJ Njibulwa
- Town and Local Government Area
- Nickname: Jaguwa
- Interactive map of Gulani
- Location in Nigeria
- Coordinates: 11°00′N 11°43′E
- Country: Nigeria
- State: Yobe State
- Headquarters: Bara

Government
  - Local Government Chairman: Ahmed Musa (APC)

Area
  - Total: 2,090 km^{2} (810 sq mi)

Population (2006)
  - Total: 103,510
  - Density: 49.5/km^{2} (128/sq mi)
- Time zone: UTC+1 (WAT)
- Postal code: 621
- ISO 3166 code: NG.YO.GL

Gulani is a town and Local Government Area in Yobe State, Nigeria. Its headquarters are in the town of Bara.

It has an area of 2,090 km^{2} and a population of 103,510 at the 2006 census.

The postal code of the area is 621.

== Climate ==
A tropical monsoon climate prevails at Gulani. All year long, there are high temperatures and a lot of rain. Gulani experiences an average yearly temperature of 18 °C (65 °F) and receives about 480 millimetres (19 inches) of precipitation. With an annual average humidity of 55% and a UV-index of 7, there are 205 dry days.

== See also ==
- List of Local Government Areas in Yobe State
