= Gujba =

LGA in Yobe State, Nigeria

- Local Government Area
- Interactive map of Gujba
- Location in Nigeria
- Coordinates: 11°29′52″N 11°55′51″E
- Country: Nigeria
- State: Yobe State
- Headquarters: Buni Yadi

Government
  - Local Government Chairman: Dala Mala Buni (APC)

Area
  - Total: 3,239 km^{2} (1,251 sq mi)

Population (2006)
  - Total: 130,088
  - Density: 40.16/km^{2} (104.0/sq mi)
- Time zone: UTC+1 (WAT)
- Postal code: 621
- ISO 3166 code: NG.YO.GJ

Gujba is a town and Local Government Area in Yobe State, Nigeria. Its headquarters are situated in Buni Yadi at 11°16′08″N 11°55′49″E towards the south of the area; the eponymous town of Gujba lies in the north of the area. It has an area of 3,239 km^{2} (1,251 mi^{2}) and a population of 130,088 at the 2006 census. The postal code of the area is 621. The town serves as the seat of the Gujba Emirate.

== Geography ==
Located in the South-East of Yobe State, Nigeria, with its administrative centre in the north, lies the town and local government area of Gujba. It is the town's seat and has 130,088 residents.

== Climate ==
Temperatures in Gujba range from 14 °C (58 °F) to 39 °C (103 °F), rarely dropping below 11 °C (52 °F) or rising above 42 °C (108 °F), and there are hot, oppressive, generally gloomy rainy seasons and blistering, windy dry seasons.

=== Rainfall ===
Gujba experiences extreme seasonal variation in monthly rainfall, with the most rainfall occurring in August and the least in January.

=== Humidity/Dew Point ===
Dew point, which impacts perspiration evaporation and cooling, affects humidity comfort in Gujba. The 6.4-month period with the greatest humidity had the most humid days in August.

== See also ==
- Gujba Forest Reserve
- List of Local Government Areas in Yobe State
