= Geidam =

- LGA and town
- Interactive map of Geidam
- Location in Nigeria
- Coordinates: 12°43′N 12°02′E
- Country: Nigeria
- State: Yobe State

Government
  - Type: Democracy
  - Local Government Chairman: Habeeb elcready (APC)

Area
  - Total: 4,357 km^{2} (1,682 sq mi)

Population (2006 census)
  - Total: 157,295
  - Density: 36.10/km^{2} (93.50/sq mi)
- Time zone: UTC+1 (WAT)
- 3-digit postal code prefix: 632
- ISO 3166 code: NG.YO.GE

Geidam is a town and Local Government Area in Yobe State, Nigeria. On 24 April 2021 terrorists from ISWAP seized Geidam killing 11 people, and over 6,000 residents were displaced. However, the Nigerian Armed Forces retook the town after an offensive against the terrorists.

It has an area of 4,357 km² and a population of 157,295 at the 2006 census.

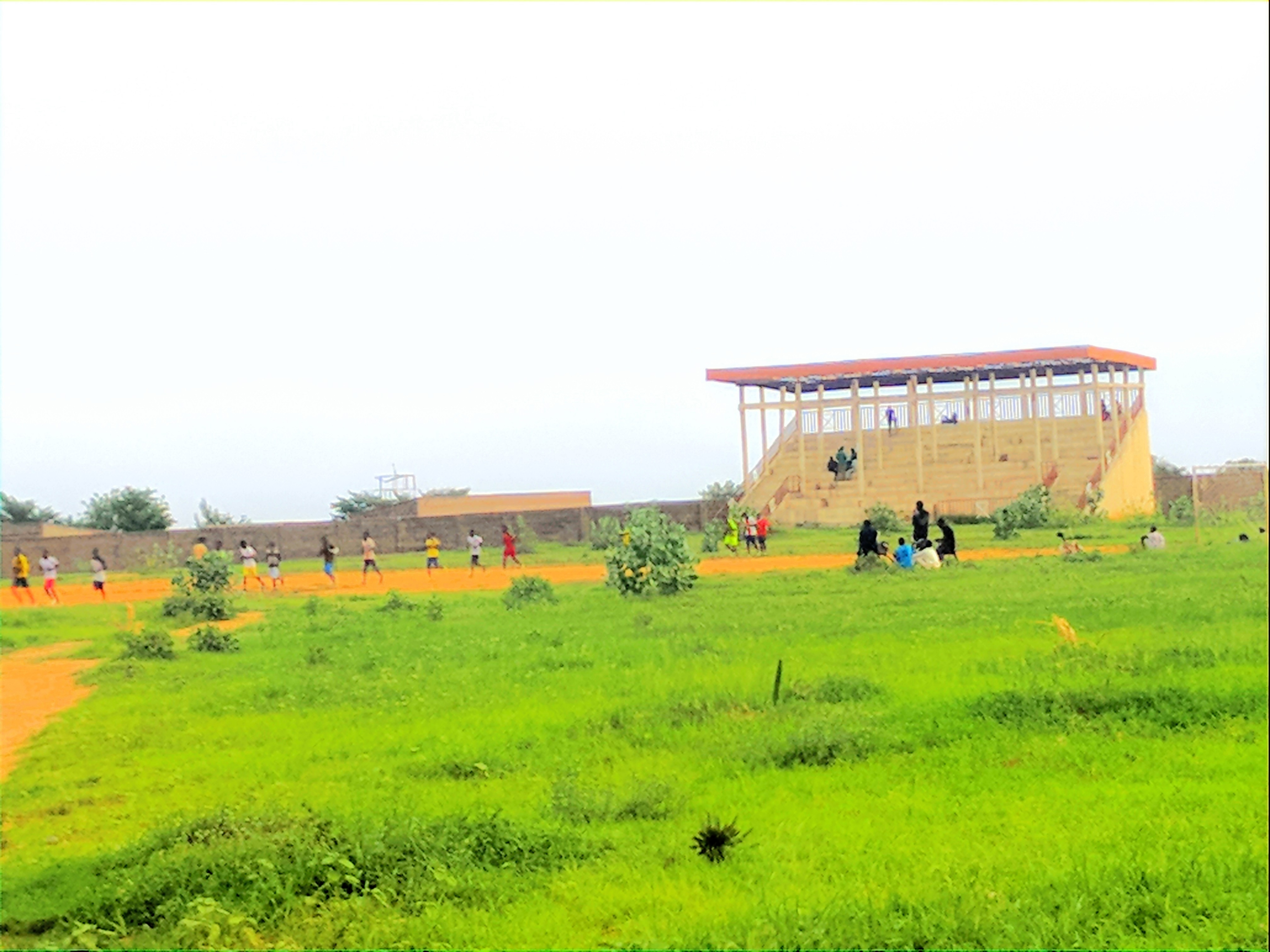
Football Stadium Geidam

The postal code of the area is 632.

== Education ==
- Mai-Idris Alooma Polytechnic, a state government owned higher education institution established in 1993.

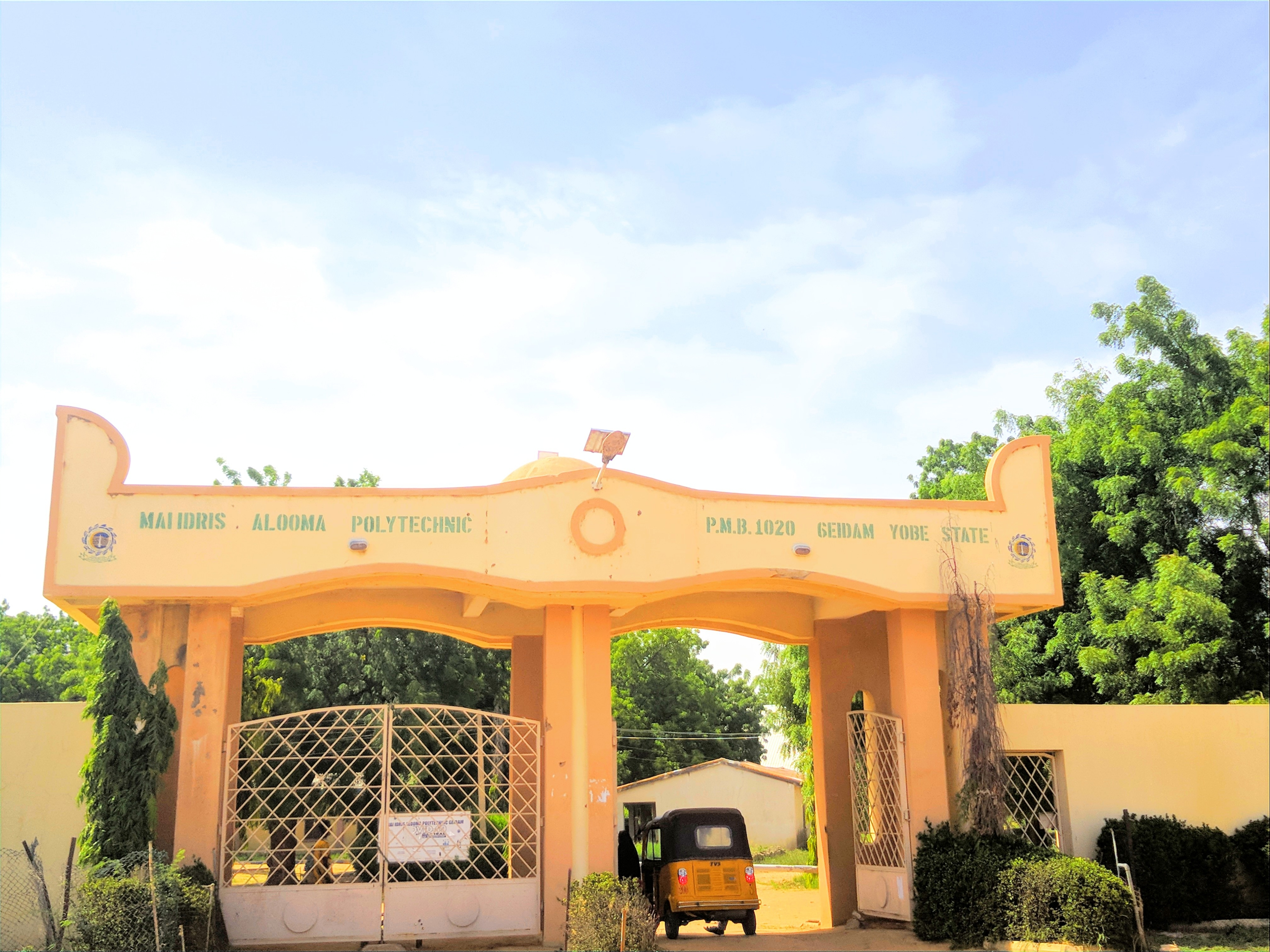
Mai Idriss Alooma Polytechnic Main Entrance Gate

== Climate/ Geography ==
Geidam has a semi-arid environment with year-round moderate to hot temperatures, drought, and little tree growth. Sand, grasses, and shrubs characterise the environment.

Geidam Local Government Area spans 4,375 square kilometres or 1,682 square miles and undergoes two well-defined seasons – the dry and rainy seasons. The average humidity in the Local Government Area is 16 percent, and the typical wind speed measures around 10 km/h or 6 mph.

=== Cloudy ===
Geidam's cloud cover varies significantly from season to season, with January being the clearest with an average of 65% cloud cover and August being the cloudiest with an average of 61% cloud cover. Beginning about December 6 and lasting for three months is the clearer season.

== Economy ==
Geidam Local Government Area is primarily an agricultural community, known for cultivating various food and cash crops. The area also engages in the rearing of animals like cows, donkeys, and rams. Unfortunately, the local economy has been severely impacted by the activities of the Boko Haram insurgency, resulting in significant loss of life, property, and the displacement of a considerable percentage of the population.

== Notable people ==
- Ibrahim Geidam
- Usman Alkali Baba

== See also ==
- List of Local Government Areas in Yobe State
