= Bade, Nigeria =

Bade
- Local Government Area
- Interactive map of Bade
- Location in Nigeria
- Coordinates: 12°52′N 10°58′E
- Country: Nigeria
- State: Yobe State
- Headquarters: Gashua

Government
  - Local Government Chairman: Sanda Kara (APC)

Area
  - Total: 772 km^{2} (298 sq mi)

Population (2006)
  - Total: 139,782
  - Density: 181/km^{2} (469/sq mi)
- Time zone: UTC+1 (WAT)
- Postal code: 631
- ISO 3166 code: NG.YO.BA

Bade (or Bedde or Badde) is a Local Government Area in Yobe State, Nigeria. It has its headquarters in the town of Gashua and covers several towns and villages including in Nigeria including Kumariya, Gashua, Dogona, Gabaruwa, Amshi, Azam, Gapchia, and Garinkur. Most of the people living in Bade are farmers and businessmen.

== Landscape ==
It has an area of 772 km^{2}.

== Population ==
It has a total population of 139,782 at the 2006 census.

== Postal code ==
The postal code of the area is 631.

== Languages and culture ==
The Bade, Fulani, Hausa, Kanuri and Duwai languages are spoken in Bade LGA. Islam is the widely practised religion in the region while fishing and cultural festivals also take place.

== Climate ==
Bade experiences a semi-arid climate characterized by consistently warm to hot conditions throughout the year. The scarcity of trees in this region is primarily attributed to prolonged periods of drought. The predominant landscape comprises sandy terrain with occasional grasses and shrubs. Bade typically records an average annual temperature of 37 degrees Celsius (98.6 degrees Fahrenheit) and receives approximately 694 mm of rainfall annually. It remains arid for about 245 days each year, with an average humidity level of 33% and a UV-index of 8.

== See also ==
- List of Local Government Areas in Yobe State
