= List of tertiary institutions in Yobe State =

Yobe State is one of the 36 States of Nigeria situated at Northeastern part of Nigeria with Damaturu as the state capital. Here is the list of tertiary institutions in Yobe State including the public and private universities, polytechnics and colleges.

== List of Federal tertiary institutions ==
1. Federal University Gashua
2. Federal College of Education (Technical), Potiskum
3. Federal Polytechnic Damaturu
4. College of Nursing Sciences Nguru

== List of state tertiary institutions ==
1. Yobe State University, Damaturu
2. Umar Suleiman College of Education, Gashua
3. Mai-Idris Alooma Polytechnic
4. Atiku Abubakar College of Legal and Islamic Studies, Nguru
5. Shehu Sule College of Nursing and Midwifery, Damaturu
6. College of Health, Sciences and Technology, Nguru
7. Yobe State College of Agriculture, Gujba
8. College of Administration, Management and Technology, Potiskum

== List of private tertiary institutions ==
1. Al-Ma'arif College of Health Science and Technology, Potiskum
2. College of Education Jibwis, Potiskum

== See also ==
- List of tertiary institutions in Abuja
- List of tertiary institutions in Ogun State
- List of tertiary institutions in Ondo State
