= Mamman Mohammed =

Nigerian medical doctor

Dr. Mamman Mohammed was a Nigerian medical doctor. He has served as the Executive Secretary of the Yobe State Hospital Management Board (YSHMB) and Chairman of the Yobe State Independent Electoral Commission (SIEC) where he oversaw local government elections in the state. He held the chieftaincy title of Chief medical officer of Fika Emirate and later got upgraded to Shamakin Fika.

== Personal life ==
Mohammed hailed from Potiskum, Yobe State, Nigeria. He had 3 wives and 33 children.

== Death ==
Mohammed died after a brief illness on 14 October 2025 at the Yobe State University Teaching Hospital, Damaturu.
