= Yobe State University Teaching Hospital =

Geography
- Location: KM 4, Potiskum Road, Northeast, Yobe state, Damaturu, Nigeria

Organisation
- Type: Teaching
- Affiliated university: Yobe State University

Services
- Beds: 700 beds

Links
- Lists: Hospitals in Nigeria

Yobe State University Teaching Hospital (YSUTH) was established in 2007 as an affiliate of the Yobe state University to provide healthcare needs of the people of Yobe state and North Eastern Nigeria.The facility is located at KM 4 Near Dikumari, Potiskum Road,Damaturu, Yobe state, Nigeria. The current serving Chief Medical Director is Professor Baba Waru Goni MBBS, FMCP

== Gallery ==
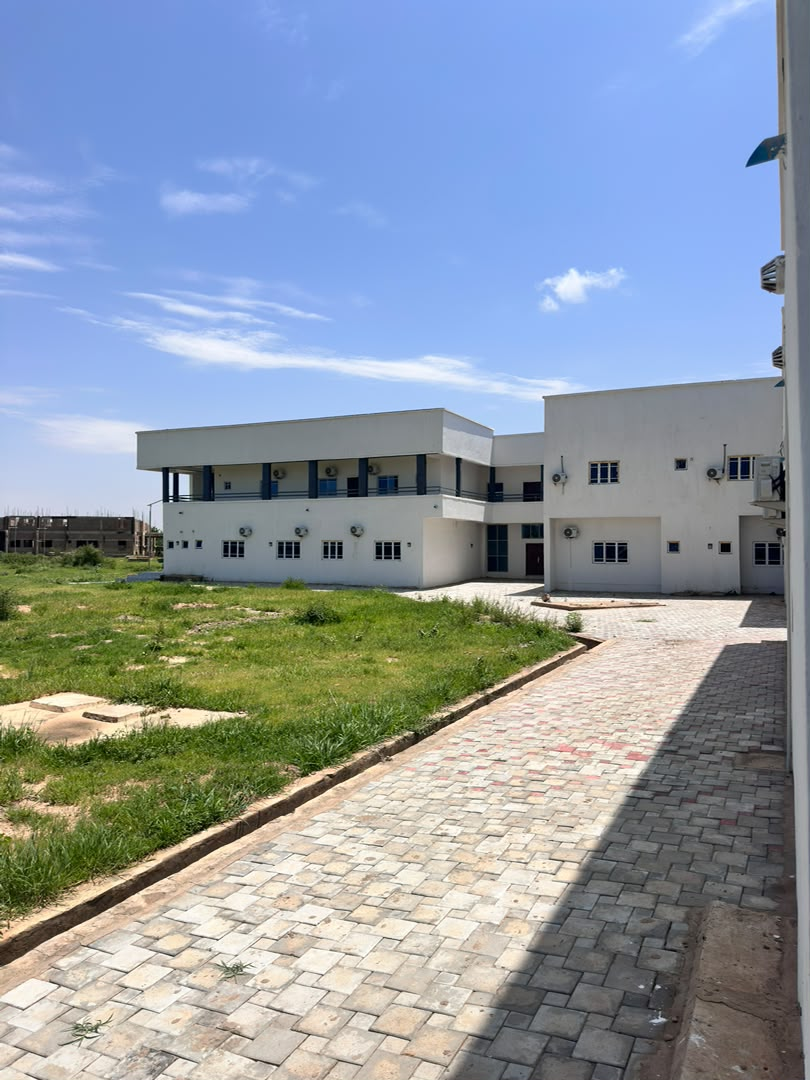
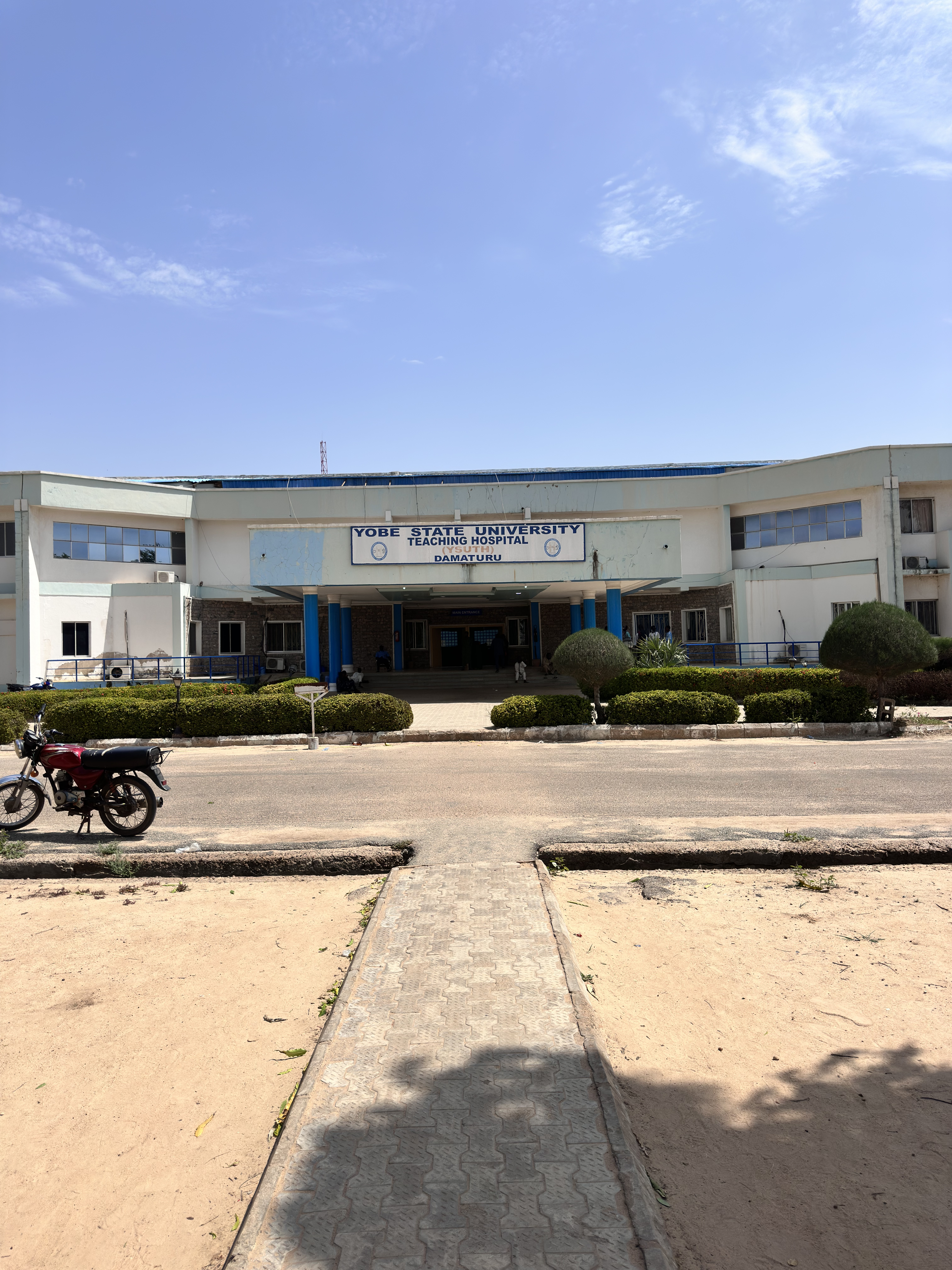
