= Gujba college massacre =

2013 mass shooting by Islamist militants in Gujba, Yobe State, Nigeria

Coordinates: 11.5022°N 11.9344°E

- Part of the Boko Haram insurgency
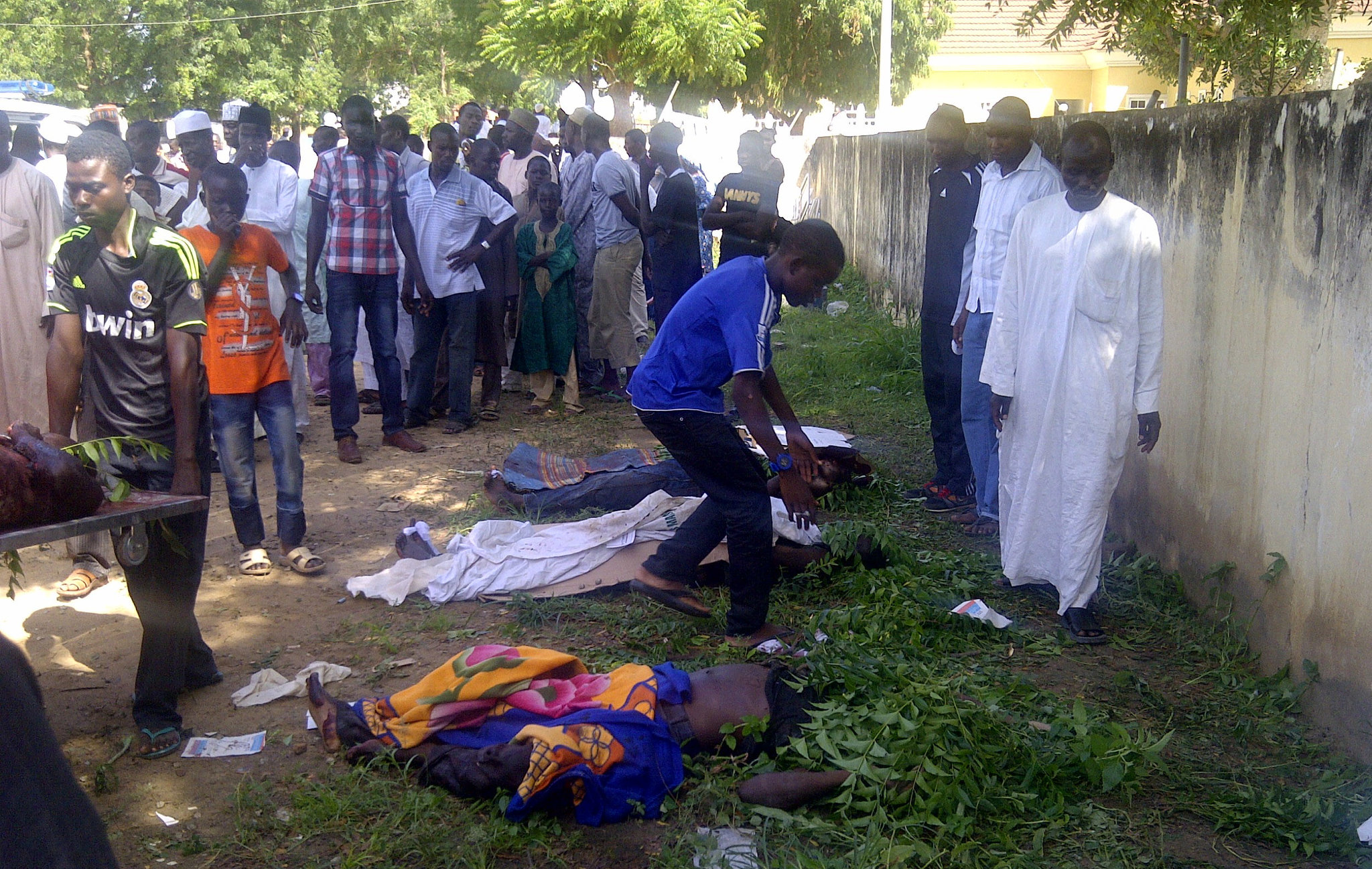
- Location: Gujba, Yobe State, Nigeria
- Date: 29 September 2013
- Target: Gujba college
- Deaths: 50
- Perpetrator: Boko Haram

On 29 September 2013, gunmen from Boko Haram entered the male dormitory in the College of Agriculture in Gujba, Yobe State, Nigeria, killing fifty students and teachers.

== Background ==
Boko Haram was founded in 2002 to fight against the de-Arabization of Nigeria, which the group maintains is the root cause of criminal behaviour in the country. From 2009 to 2013, violence linked to the Boko Haram insurgency resulted in 3,600 deaths, with the victims including 1,600 civilians. In mid-May 2013, the federal government declared a state of emergency in Adamawa, Borno, and Yobe States, as it aimed to end the Boko Haram insurgency. The resulting crackdown has led to the capture or killing of hundreds of Boko Haram members, with the remainder retreating to mountainous areas from which they have increasingly targeted civilians.

Since 2010, Boko Haram has targeted schools, killing hundreds of students. A spokesperson said such attacks would continue as long as government continued to interfere with traditional Koran-based education. More than 10,000 children are no longer able to attend school due to attacks by the Boko Haram. Roughly 20,000 people fled Yobe State to Cameroon during June 2013 to escape the violence.

== Attack ==
Gunmen from Boko Haram entered the college at 1 a.m. local time and opened fire on the students while they were asleep. Only the male sleeping quarters were targeted. Forty-two bodies were recovered by Nigerian soldiers while eighteen injured were transported to Damaturu Specialist Hospital. Two of the wounded later died.

According to one survivor, the attackers drove into the college in two double-cabin pickup all-terrain vehicles. Some were wearing Nigerian military uniforms. A survivor said that nearly all of those killed were Muslims, as is the majority of the student body. This attack followed a 6 July 2013 attack at Mamudo outside Damaturu that killed 29 students and a teacher, some by burning alive, which left many schools in the area closed, and other attacks in the week following killed 30 more civilians. Boko Haram's name means "Western education is sinful".

After the attacks, 1000 other students fled the college. The militants appeared to be based in the Gwoza Hills, finding shelter in caves from repeated military bombardments. An engagement with the Nigerian military left 100 militants and 16 soldiers dead. In Gwoza town, where some of the victims were being treated, militants drove away medical officers from the government hospital and set fire to three public schools, and the town was reported to be deserted. More than 30,000 people from the region fled to Cameroon and Chad.

== See also ==
- Afaka kidnapping
