= 2014 Nigeria school attack =

2014 Nigeria school attack may refer to:

- 2014 Potiskum bombings
  - 2014 Potiskum school bombing
- Chibok schoolgirls kidnapping
- February 2014 Buni Yadi massacre
