= List of tertiary institutions in Abuja =

Abuja is the Nigeria's Federal Capital Territory, situated in the central region of the country. It is where the Presidential Villa is located.

== List of Universities ==
- University of Abuja
- African University of Science and Technology
- Baze University, Abuja
- National Open University, Abuja
- Nile University of Nigeria, Abuja
- Veritas University, Abuja
- Miva Open University, Abuja
- Philomath University
- CIty University, Abuja

== List of Colleges ==
- Federal College of Education, Zuba, Abuja
- Aspire College of Technology

== List of Polytechnics ==
- Citi Polytechnic, Abuja
- Dorben Polytechnic, Abuja

== Schools of Nursing ==
- Federal Capital Territory (FCT) School of Nursing, Abuja
- School of Nursing, Abuja University Teaching Hospital (AUTH), Abuja

== List of Vocational Institutes ==
- Afrihub ICT Institute
- Comprehensive Institute of Management and Technology
- Damson Institute of Management and Technology
- Flying Dove Institute of Information Technology
- Global Institute of Commerce and Technology, Gwarinpa
- NAOWA Institute of Management and Technology
- National Centre for Women Development, Abuja

== Other Tertiary Institutions ==
- Abuja School of Pension and Retirement
- National Institute for Legislative Studies, Maitama
- Industrial Training Fund (ITF) Models Skill Training Centre
- Agency for Mass Education Training Centre, Asokoro
- Agency for Mass Education Technology Centre, Asokoro
- Armed Forces Electrical and Mechanical Mechatronic School, Abuja
- Nspire Educational Services

== See also ==
- List of Tertiary Institutions in Yobe State
- List of tertiary institutions in Ogun State
- List of tertiary institutions in Ondo State
- List of tertiary institutions in Nasarawa State
