= Damaturu Specialist Hospital =

Hospital in Yobe State, Nigeria

Geography
- Location: Damaturu, East, Yobe State, Nigeria

History
- Former name: Damaturu General Hospital
- Opened: 1979

Links
- Lists: Hospitals in Nigeria

The Damaturu Specialist Hospital or State Specialist Hospital, Damaturu is a public hospital, located in Damaturu, Damaturu Local Government Area, Yobe State, Nigeria. It was established in 1979 and operates on 24 hours basis. It was upgraded to a Specialist Hospital in the year 2022.

== Description ==
The Damaturu Specialist Hospital was licensed by the Federal Ministry of Health with facility code 35/03/1/2/1/0002 and registered as Secondary Health Care Centre.

== Services ==
- Medical Services
- Surgical Services
- Dental Services
- Obstetrics & Gynecology Services
