= A342 highway (Nigeria) =

Road in Nigeria

Coordinates: 5.055982°N 7.877246°E

Trunk Road A342

Location
- Country: Nigeria

Highway system
- Transport in Nigeria

The A342 highway is a highway in Nigeria. It is one of the east-west roads linking the main south-north roads. It is named from the two highways it links, the A3 highway and A4 highway.

It runs between the A3 at Aba, Abia State — and the beginning of the A4 on the southern side of Cross River, at Oron in Akwa Ibom State.

The road passes through Ikot Ekpene and Uyo.
