= February 2015 Nigeria bombings =

Series of suicide bombings in northern Nigeria

In February 2015, suicide bombings occurred in the northern Nigerian cities Damaturu, Potiskum and Kano.

On 15 February 2015, a teenage female suicide bomber detonated herself at 1pm at a crowded bus station in Damaturu, Yobe State, killing at least 16 people and wounding 30 others. It was Damaturu's first suicide bombing.

On 22 February 2015, a child female suicide bomber killed five people in addition to herself and wounded dozens at a security checkpoint outside a market in Potiskum, Yobe State.

On 24 February 2015, a suicide bomber detonated himself while trying to board a bus at Dan-Borno bus station in Potiskum, killing 17 people, injuring over 30 and destroying the bus. Hours later on the same day, in Kano, two male suicide bombers detonated themselves at Kano Line bus station, killing 10 people.
