= A344 =

A344 may refer to:

- A344 highway (Nigeria), a highway in Nigeria
- A344 road (England), a former road in Wiltshire near Stonehenge
