= Damaturu Central Mosque =

Mosque in Yobe, Nigeria

Yobe Mosque, Yobe Islamic Centre (YIC) Damaturu
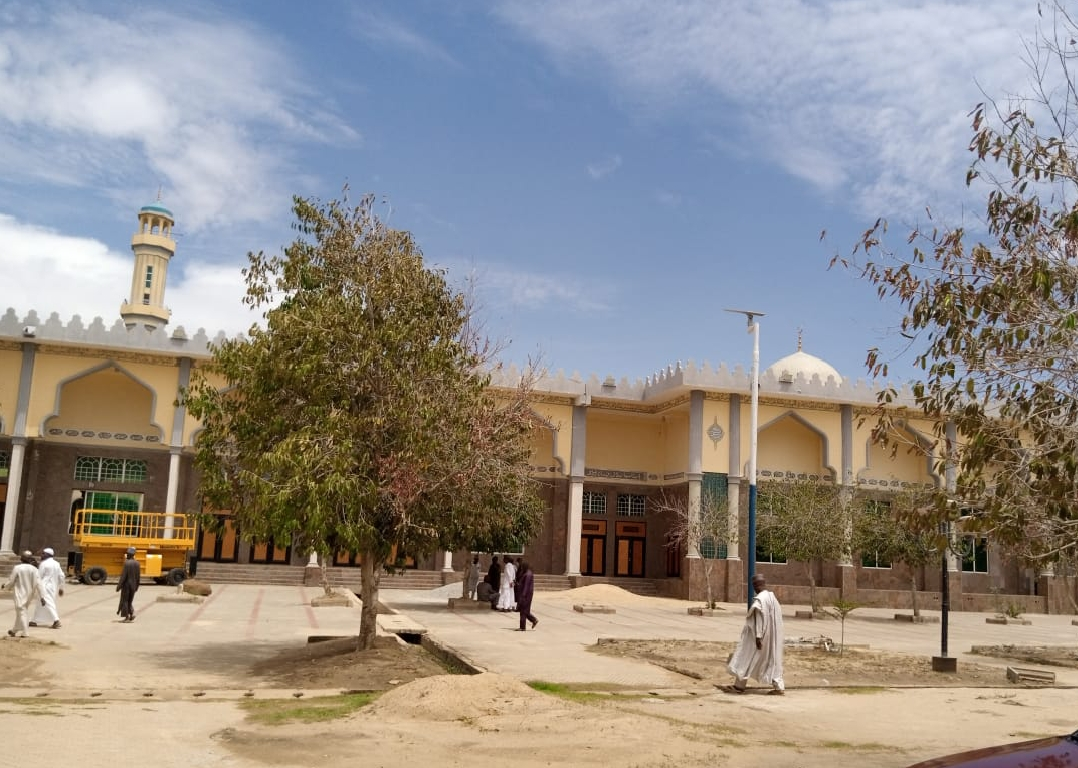

Religion
- Affiliation: Islam
- District: Damaturu
- Province: Yobe State
- Region: Northeast Nigeria
- Ecclesiastical or organisational status: Active

Location
- Location: Damaturu, Yobe State, Nigeria
- Country: Nigeria
- Interactive map of Yobe Mosque, Yobe Islamic Centre (YIC) Damaturu
- Coordinates: 11°44′33″N 11°58′26″E

Architecture
- Type: Mosque
- Completed: 1990s

Specifications
- Capacity: 3,000+ worshippers
- Dome: 1
- Minaret: 2

Yobe Mosque is the Friday mosque in Damaturu, the capital city of Yobe State, Nigeria. It is one of the biggest and most important places of worship in the state, where people from the city and nearby areas come to pray.

== History ==
The mosque was constructed in the early 1990s during a period of rapid urban and administrative growth in Damaturu. It was built to serve the increasing Muslim population after the town became the capital of Yobe State in 1991. Over the years, the mosque has undergone renovations and expansions to accommodate more worshippers and improve its facilities.

== Architecture ==
The Damaturu Central Mosque combines both modern and traditional Islamic designs. It has a big dome in the middle, two tall towers, and a wide prayer hall with beautiful arches. Inside, the floors are tiled, the walls have Arabic writings, and there are separate sections for men and women to pray.

== Religious and social significance ==
Apart from being a place of prayer, the mosque is also an important part of the city's social and cultural life. It holds Friday prayers, Eid celebrations, religious talks, and community gatherings. The mosque also serves as a center where people learn about Islam and receive guidance.

== Location ==
The mosque is located in the heart of Damaturu, near the main city market and government offices, making it easily accessible to both residents and visitors.

== Insurgency ==
In November 2014, the city of Damaturu experienced a series of attacks carried out by the militant group Boko Haram. Several parts of the city were affected, including areas around the Damaturu Central Mosque. Reports indicated that explosions and gunfire occurred near the mosque during clashes between security forces and insurgents. Although the mosque itself was not completely destroyed, the incident caused fear among residents and led to temporary restrictions on movement in the city. The attack was part of a broader wave of insurgent violence that affected much of northeastern Nigeria during that period.

== See also ==
- List of mosques in Nigeria
- Islam in Nigeria
- Yobe State
