= Mala Mohammed Daura =

Nigerian academic and administrator

- Born: June 13, 1962 (age 64); Daura, Fune LGA, Yobe State
- Education: University of Maiduguri (B.Sc.); Southwestern University of Ibadan (M.Sc.); Katholieke University Leven (Ph.D.)
- Years active: 1986-Date

Mala Mohammed Daura (born June 13, 1962) is a Nigerian academic and administrator. He has been the Vice Chancellor of Yobe State University, Damaturu since January 1, 2020, following his appointment by the Governor of Yobe State, Alhaji Mai Mala Buni. He is the fourth Vice Chancellor of the university.

== Early life and education ==
Born in Daura and hailing from Fune Local Government of Yobe State, Daura began his academic journey at Daura Primary School, Borno State, from 1968 to 1975. He continued his education at Government Secondary School Damaturu, Yobe State, between 1975 and 1980. Daura pursued higher education at the University of Maiduguri, earning his undergraduate degree from 1981 to 1985. He pursued a master's degree at Southwestern University of Ibadan, from 1987 to 1988 and did his post-doctoral research at the Laboratory for Experimental Geomorphology, Katholieke University Leuven Belgium, from March 1995 to June 1995.

== Academic career ==
Daura commenced his teaching career as a Youth Corper in the Department of Geography at Ondo State University, Ado-Ekiti, Ondo State, from 1985 to 1986. He then joined the University of Maiduguri as a graduate assistant on October 2, 1986, eventually rising to the position of professor on October 1, 2004. Daura served as the Pioneer Rector of Yobe State Polytechnic, Geidam, from November 2002 to April 2004. He also held roles at the University of Maiduguri, including deputy vice-chancellor (Central Administration) from April 15, 2004, to August 3, 2008, and Ag. vice-chancellor from May 21, 2008, to June 2, 2009. Daura subsequently served as the vice-chancellor of the University of Maiduguri from June 3, 2009, to June 2, 2014. He served as a visiting professor at Nasarawa State University, Keffi, and the University of Abuja. Subsequently, Daura assumed the role of Director at the Centre for Disaster Risk Management and Development Studies (CDRM&DS).Amen Estate

Daura is a member of the Association of Nigerian Geographers, the Nigerian Geomorphological Working Group (NGWG), and holds fellowships with the Institute of Industrialists and Corporate Administrators (FIICA) and the Institute of Public Diplomacy and Management (FCIPDM).
