= List of wards in Potiskum =

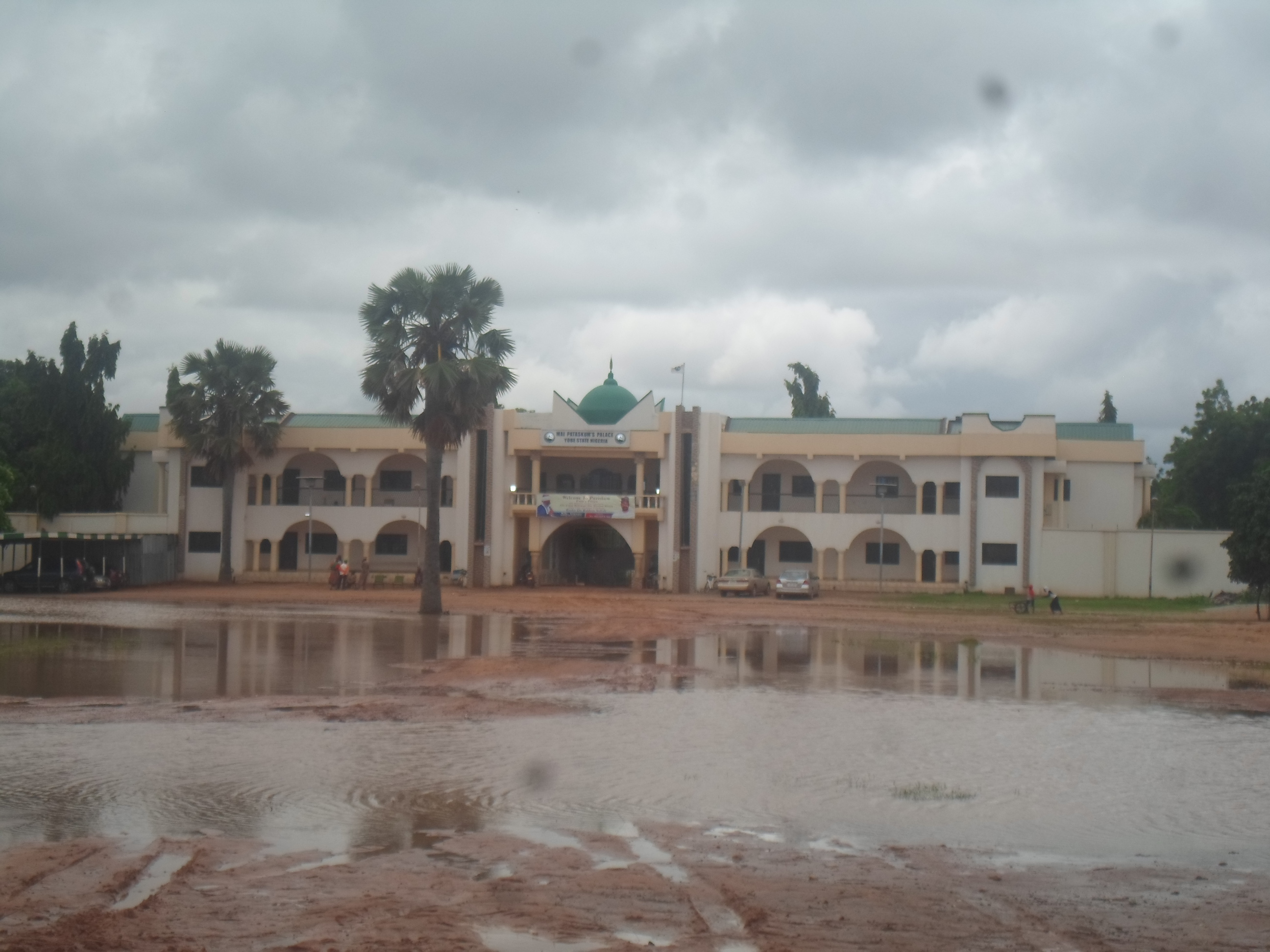
Potiskum Emir Palace

Potiskum is the largest city among all the 17 local government Areas of Yobe state in terms of human population and businesses transactions. It's located on latitude 11˚43'N and longitude 11˚04'E.

== Wards ==
The following are the 10 wards in Potiskum Local Government Area:

- Bare-bare/Bauya/Lailai Dumbulwa
- Bolewa 'A'
- Bolewa 'B'
- Danchuwa/Bula
- Dogo Nini Ward
- Dogo Tebo Ward
- Hausawa
- Mamudo
- Ngojin/Alaraba
- Yerimaram/Garin Daye/Badejo/Nahuta
