= Mamudo school massacre =

2013 Boko Haram attack in Mamudo, Nigeria

Coordinates: 11°41′21″N 11°10′52″E

Yobe State school shooting
- Part of the Boko Haram insurgency
- Location: Mamudo, Yobe State, Nigeria
- Date: 6 July 2013
- Target: Government Secondary School
- Attack type: Arson, mass murder, mass shooting, school shooting, Islamic terrorism
- Deaths: 42
- Injuries: 6+
- Perpetrator: Boko Haram

On 6 July 2013, Boko Haram insurgents attacked the Government Secondary School in the village of Mamudo in Yobe State, Nigeria and killed at least 42 people. Most of the victims were students, although some staff members were also killed.

== Background ==
Boko Haram was founded in 2002 to seek the establishment of an Islamic state and fight against the Westernization of Nigeria, which the group says is the root cause of criminal behaviour in that country. From 2009 to 2013, violence linked to the Boko Haram insurgency resulted in 3,600 deaths, the victims including 1,600 civilians. In mid-May 2013, Nigeria declared a state of emergency in Adamawa, Borno, and Yobe States aiming to end the Boko Haram insurgency. The resulting crackdown has led to the capture or killing of hundreds of Boko Haram members, with the remainder retreating to mountainous areas from which they increasingly targeted civilians.

Since 2010, Boko Haram has targeted schools, killing hundreds of students. A spokesperson said such attacks would continue as long as government soldiers continued to interfere with traditional Koran-based education. More than 10,000 children are no longer able to attend school due to attacks by Boko Haram. Roughly 20,000 people fled Yobe State to Cameroon during June 2013 to escape the violence.

In June 2013, Nigerian soldiers beat students at a Koran-based school, angering Boko Haram members. An attack on 16 June by Boko Haram militants killed seven children, two teachers, two soldiers, and two militants. The next day, militants killed nine students who were taking exams. On 4 July, gunmen attacked and killed a school headmaster and his family.

Mamudo is 5 km (3.1 mi) from Potiskum, Yobe State's largest city. Boko Haram have carried out several major attacks there.

== Attack ==
Before dawn on 6 July 2013, gunmen attacked a secondary school in Mamudo, Yobe State, northeastern Nigeria, where they killed at least 42 people. A local eyewitness described the situation: "It was a gory sight...There were 42 bodies; most of them were students. Some of them had parts of their bodies blown off and badly burnt while others had gunshot wounds." Most of the dead were students, with a few staff members and a teacher also killed. Some were burned alive while others died of gunshot wounds. At the morgue, parents struggled to identify their children, as many bodies were burned beyond recognition. Survivors were taken to a nearby clinic, guarded by the Nigerian army.

According to survivors, the gunmen gathered the victims in a central location and then began shooting and throwing explosives. The assailants also brought fuel, which they used to set the school on fire. Six students who escaped were found hiding in the bushes with gunshot wounds and taken to the hospital. More than 100 others were missing as of 6 July.

== Reactions ==
On 7 July, Yobe State governor Ibrahim Gaidam called the attackers cold-blooded murderers and "devoid of any shred of humanity". He ordered all secondary schools in the state to close until September, the start of the new academic year. He also requested that the national government end the mobile phone blackout in the state, saying the lack of mobile service prevented citizens from alerting authorities of suspicious people in the area prior to the attack.
