= Federal College of Education (Technical), Potiskum =

College in Yobe State, Nigeria

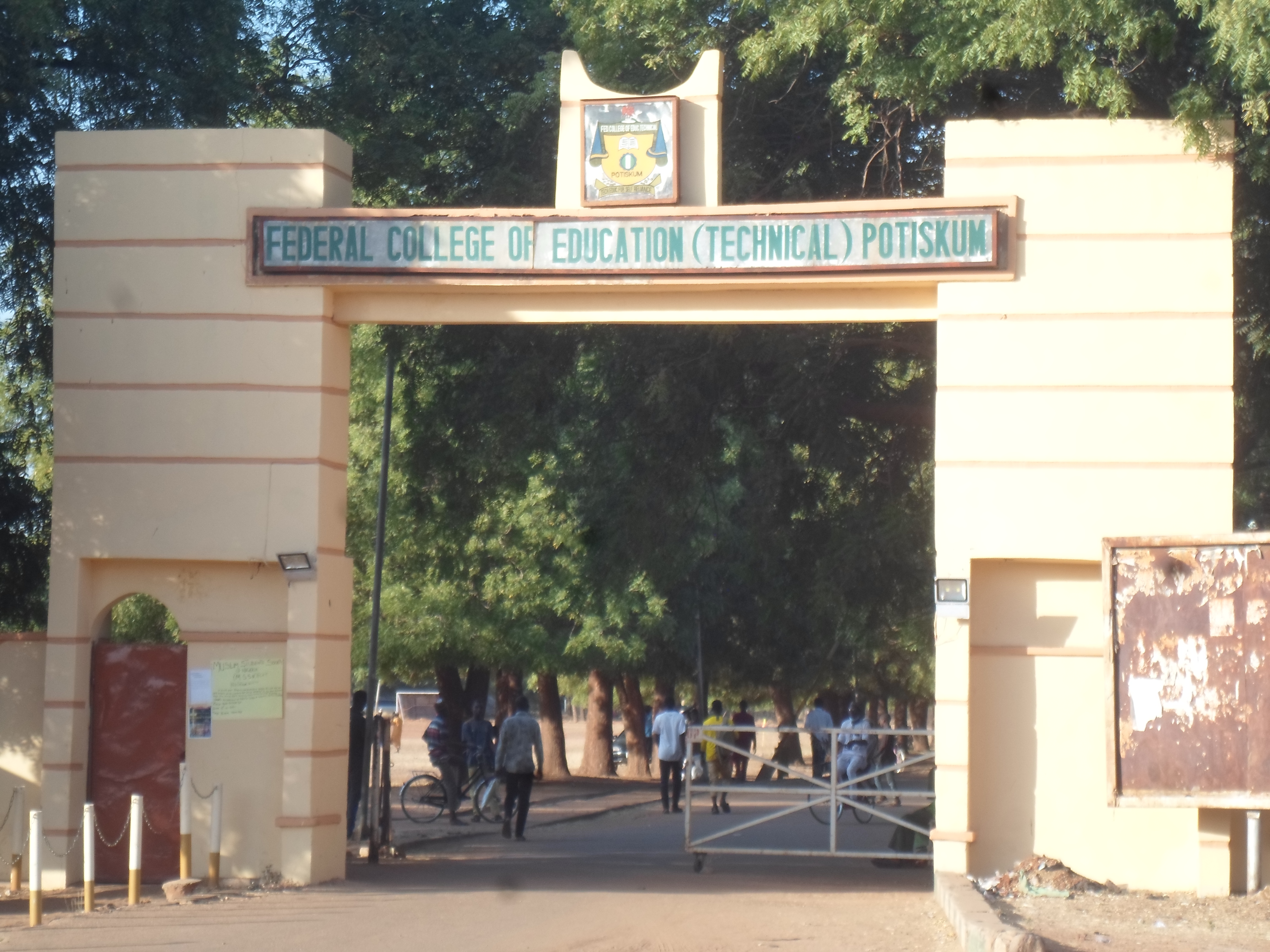
- Entrance gate of the Federal College of Education (Technical) Potiskum
- Motto: Learning re-defined
- Type: Public
- Established: 1991
- Affiliations: Abubakar Tafawa Balewa University
- Provost: Muhammad Madu Yunusa
- Location: Potiskum, Yobe State, Nigeria
- Website: fcetpotiskum.edu.ng

The Federal College of Education (Technical), Potiskum is a federal government higher education institution, located in Potiskum, Yobe State, Nigeria. It was first affiliated with Federal University of Technology Minna then substituted to Abubakar Tafawa Balewa University for its degree programmes. The college started offering PGDE programmes in 2021. The current Provost of the college is Dr. Muhammad Madu Yunusa.

== History ==
The Federal College of Education (Technical), Potiskum was established in 1991. It was originally known as Federal Advanced Teachers’ College (FATC), Yola.

== Schools ==
The college has the following schools:

- School of Science Education
- School of Technical Education
- School of Business Education
- School of Vocational Education
- School of Education
- School of Languages
- School of social science
- School of Secondary Education

== Departments ==
School of Science Education has the following departments:

- Chemistry and Education Complex
- Physics and Education Complex
- Mathematics and Education Complex
- Biology and Education Complex
- Integrated Science and Education Complex

School of Vocational Education has the following departments:

- Agricultural Science and Education Complex
- Home Economics and Education Complex
- Fine and Applied Art and Education Complex

School of Technical Education has the following departments:

- Electrical and Education Complex
- Automobile and Education Complex
- Building and Education Complex
- Woodwork and Education Complex
- Metalwork and Education Complex

School of Business Education has the following departments:

- Secretarial and Education Complex
- Accounting and Education Complex

School of Education has the following departments:

- Primary Education Complex
- Early Childhood Education Complex

== Courses ==
The institution offers the following courses;

- Education and physics
- Building technology education
- Woodwork technology education
- Education and integrated science
- Integrated science/physics
- Education and computer science
- Education and mathematics
- Home economics
- Computer education/chemistry
- Chemistry/integrated science
- Computer education/physics
- Electrical/electronics education
- Automobile technology education
- Education and chemistry
- Biology/integrated science
- Agricultural science and education
- Education and biology
- Business education
- Computer education/biology
- Computer science education/mathematics
- Agricultural science
- Early childhood care education
- Technical education
- Fine and applied arts
- Primary education studies
- Computer science/biology
- Metalwork technology education

== Affiliation ==
The institution is affiliated with the Abubakar Tafawa Balewa University to offer programmes leading to Bachelor of Education, (B.Ed.) in;

- Education & mathematics
- Metal work technology education
- Education and biology
- Wood work/education
- Automobile technology education
- Electrical/electronics education
- Education and chemistry
- Education & computer science
- Education & physics
- Building education
- Business education
- Agricultural science and education

== See also ==
- List of tertiary institutions in Yobe State
