= Shehu Sule College of Nursing and Midwifery, Damaturu =

Medical college in Nigeria

Shehu Sule College of Nursing and Midwifery, Damaturu is a state-owned health institution situated in Damaturu, the capital city of Yobe State. It was established in 1993. The new provost of the college is Mallam Ibrahim Mamman Nasir, taking over from Hajiya Hadiza Sabo

== Courses ==
The college offers the following courses

- Nursing
- Midwifery
