= 2014 Potiskum bombings =

Terrorist incident in Nigeria

2014 Yobe State attacks
- Part of the Boko Haram insurgency
- Location: Potiskum, Yobe State, Nigeria
- Date: 3 and 10 November 2014
- Attack type: Suicide bombings
- Deaths: 61
- Injuries: 129

In November 2014, two separate terrorist attacks took place in Potiskum in Yobe State, Nigeria. Both incidents involved suicide bombers, killing at least 61 people and injuring scores of others. In both cases, Boko Haram has been accused of carrying out the attacks.

== Attack on Shias ==
On 3 November 2014, a suicide bomber killed at least 15 people in an attack on Shia Muslims who were marching to mark the Day of Ashura. Around fifty people were injured in the attack, and five others were shot by security forces.

== School attack ==
On 10 November 2014, at least 46 people were killed and 79 wounded in a suicide bombing on Potiskum, Yobe State, Nigeria. The attack took place when students assembled in the hall of the Government Science Secondary School. The bomber entered the school wearing a school uniform. Following the attack, the state governor closed all public schools in the area.

== See also ==
- Yobe State school shooting
- Islamic extremism in Northern Nigeria
