= 5 July 2015 Nigeria attacks =

Series of bombings and arson attacks in Nigeria

On 5 July 2015, major attacks occurred in Nigeria - in Potiskum, Jos and Borno.

Just before 10am on 5 July 2015, in Potiskum, Yobe State, a suicide bombing occurred at an evangelical church, the Redeemed Christian Church of God. It killed six people, including the bomber.

In the evening of the same day in Jos, Plateau State, a bomb that had been planted in a restaurant exploded, killing 23 people. During the same evening in the same city, a suicide bombing occurred at a mosque, killing 21 people.

On the same day in Borno State, a group of insurgents killed 9 villagers as well as burned down 32 churches and about 300 homes.
