= A344 highway (Nigeria) =

Road in Nigeria

Coordinates: 7.299982°N 8.635426°E

Trunk Road A344

Location
- Country: Nigeria

Highway system
- Transport in Nigeria

The A344 highway is a highway in Nigeria. It is one of the east-west roads linking the main south-north roads. (It is named from the two highways it links).

It runs from the A3 highway at Aliade, Benue State to the A4 highway south of Katsina-Ala. The main city on the route is Gboko.
