= Dagona Birds Sanctuary =

Nigerian Tourist Centre

- Interactive map of Dagona Birds Sanctuary
- Location: Bade, Yobe State, Northeastern Nigeria
- Area: 657 square kilometres (254 sq mi)

Dagona Birds Sanctuary is a waterfowl sanctuary and a tourist centre located in Bade, an LGA in Yobe State, Northeastern Nigeria. It is one of the important regions marked for conservation of avifauna species in Sub-Saharan Africa.

== Description ==
The Sanctuary is part of the Chad Basin National Park. It is centered around a seasonally flooded ox-bow lake, located at Kuza Fadama on the tributary of the river Hadejia and covers an estimated area of 657 km^{2}. Besides the lake, the sanctuary comprises woodland and grassland. Wildlife in it includes Palearctic and Afrotropical migratory water birds, and the flora and fauna of both Sudano-Sahel and forest ecological zones. The lake is used as a seasonal stop-over habitat by thousands of exotic birds migrating during the winter from Europe, Americas and Asia.

== International visitors ==
Several distinguished people have visited the sanctuary, including Prince Bernhard of Netherlands in 1987, Prince Philips in 1989, Prince Charles and Princess Diana in 1990

== Climate change ==
Climate change has caused both drought and flooding in the sanctuary, alternately drying up the wetlands and washing away nests. Seasonal migrants to the lake are increasingly scarce.
