= Mamudo =

Area of Potiskum in Yobe State, Nigeria

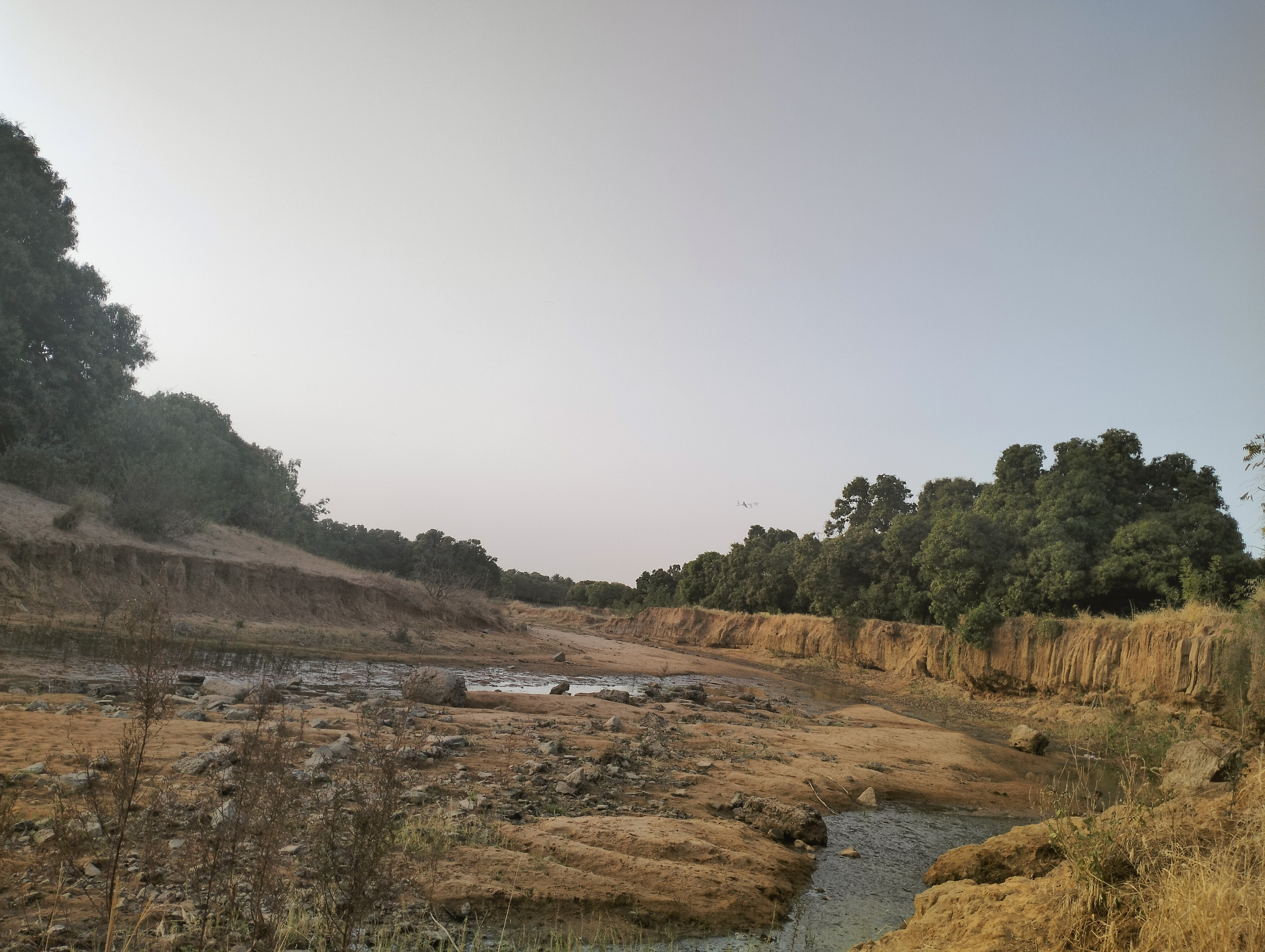
Home of gardens

Mamudo is a ward and constituency located under Potiskum (LGA) of Yobe State in the Northeastern part of Nigeria. It serves as one of the political and administrative divisions of the Potiskum Local Government, and it is represented in the Yobe State House of Assembly as the Mamudo Constituency. Yobe's capital (Damaturu) is approximately 85 km / 53 mi away from Mamudo (as the crow flies). The distance from Mamudo to Nigeria's capital (Abuja) is approximately 498 km / 309 mi (as the crow flies).
