= Damaturu prison break =

Prison break in Nigeria suspected to be orchestrated by Boko Haram

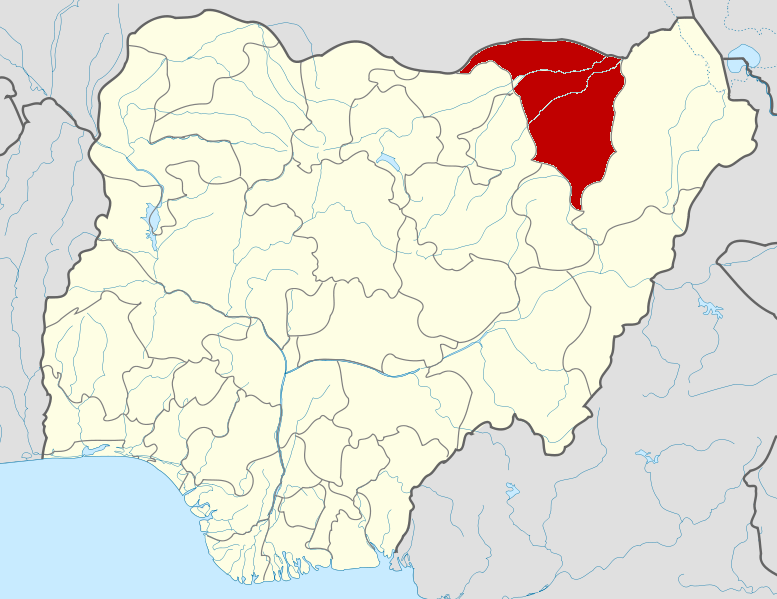
- Location: Yobe State, Northeastern Nigeria
- Date: 2 June 2012
- Target: Jimeta prison, Damaturu
- Attack type: Prison break; Terrorist attack
- Deaths: 8
- Perpetrator: Boko Haram
- No. of participants: 40
- Defender: 41

The Damaturu prison break was an attack on the Jimeta prison at Damaturu, the capital of Yobe State in the northeastern Nigeria by 40 gunmen suspected to be members of the terrorist group Boko Haram. The attack is thought to have been a bid to rescue imprisoned members of Boko Haram. About 40 prisoners escaped from the prison; seven inmates and one prison warden died. The escaped prisoners were largely members of the insurgent.

== Incident ==
The incident occurred on the morning of Sunday, 4 June 2012. It was reported that the terrorist attacked the prison through the Emir's palace during curfew hours imposed by the Yobe state government. The entrance of the terrorists drew the attention of the armed prison guards and other security agencies within the prison, resulting in an exchange of gunfire between the Boko Haram and security personnel. The escapees were largely members of the Boko Haram. The prison break resulted in the death of seven prisoners and a prison official, leaving several people injured.

== See also ==
- List of prison breaks in Nigeria
- Nigeria prison break
