= The Federal Polytechnic Damaturu =

Higher Education in Damaturu, Yobe State, Nigeria

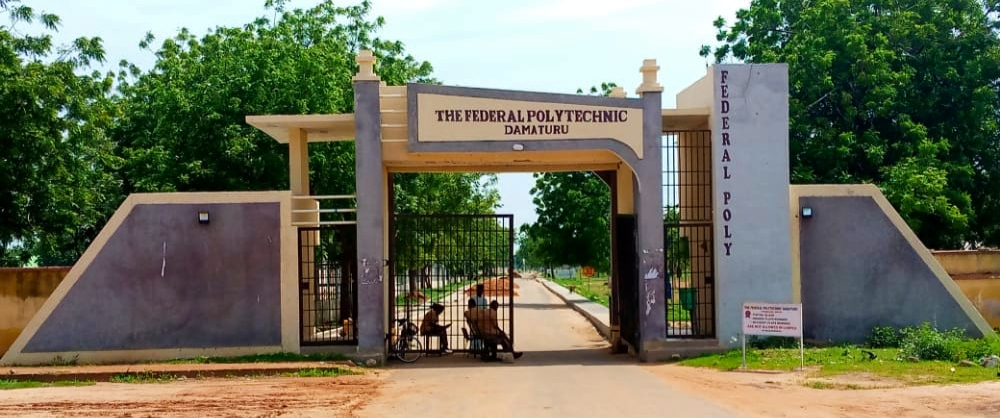
- Federal Polytechnic Damaturu Entry Gate
- Type: Public
- Established: 1992
- Rector: Dr. Ibrahim Bello Bashir
- Location: Damaturu, Yobe State, Nigeria; 11°44′51.2″N 11°59′2.2″E
- Website: Official website

The Federal Polytechnic Damaturu is a federal government higher education institution located in Damaturu, Yobe State, Nigeria. The current acting Rector is Dr.Ibrahim Bello Bashir.

== History ==
Federal Polytechnic Damaturu was established in May 1993 by the Federal Government of Nigeria (via Decree No. 2 of 1993) to foster technical and vocational education, with academic activities commencing on September 25, 1995. Located in Yobe State, it has grown from six departments into five main schools offering ND and HND programs in Engineering, Environmental Studies, Science, Management, Health science, and General Studies.

== Courses ==
The institution offers the following courses;

- Marketing
- Electrical/Electronic Engineering
- Statistics
- Urban and Regional Planning
- Office Technology and Management
- Science Laboratory Technology
- Electrical/Electronic Engineering Technology
- Surveying and Geo-Informatics
- Computer Science
- Public Administration
- Mechanical Engineering Technology
- Computer Engineering
- Estate Management and Valuation
- Railway Engineering
- Renewable Energy
- Environmental health
- Health information management
- Public health
- Environmental Health
- Health education and promotion
- Forensic science
- Networking and Cloud Computing
