= A3 highway (Nigeria) =

Road in Nigeria

Coordinates: 5.27395°N 7.327115°E

Trunk Road A3

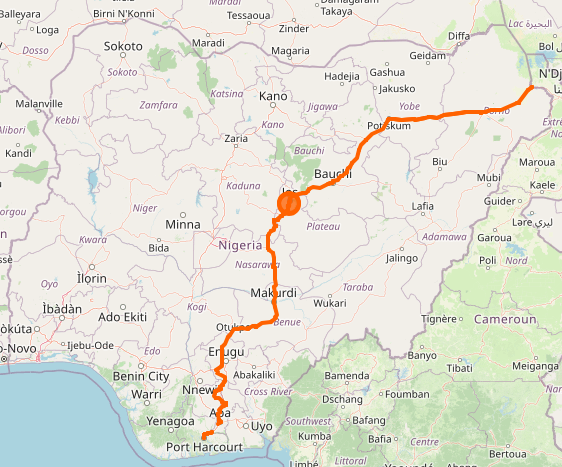
- The A3 highway is indicated in orange.

Route information
- Length: 1,502 km (933 mi)

Major junctions
- South end: A2 – Port Harcourt
- A2 – Port Harcourt; A1 – Aba, Nigeria; A7 – Umuahia; A344 – Okigwe; A1 – Enugu; A342 – Ngwo; A3 – Makurdi; A3 – Lafia; A3 – Jos; A3 – Bauchi; A3 – Potiskum; A4 – Damaturu; A4 – Maiduguri
- Northeast end: – Gamboru, Cameroon

Location
- Country: Nigeria
- Major cities: Port Harcourt; Aba; Umuahia; Okigwe; Enugu; Ngwo; Makurdi; Lafia; Jos; Bauchi; Potiskum; Damaturu; Maiduguri; Gamboru

Highway system
- Transport in Nigeria
← A2	→ A4

The A3 highway is a major arterial road in Nigeria, connecting the city of Port Harcourt in the south to the Cameroon border at Gamboru in the northeast. It is a transportation route, serving several cities and regions in Nigeria.

== Route ==
The A3 highway spans approximately 1,502 kilometres (933 mi). It starts from Port Harcourt in the south and heads north, passing through several cities and regions, including Aba, Umuahia, Okigwe, Enugu, Ngwo, Makurdi, Lafia, Jos, Bauchi, Potiskum, Damaturu, Maiduguri, and finally reaching Gamboru in the northeast at the Cameroon border.

The highway eventually crosses the border into Cameroon at Gamboru and connects to N'Djamena, the capital of Chad.

== Gamboru Bridge ==
On May 9, 2014, the bridge linking Gamboru to the rest of Nigeria, as well as the immigration checkpoints of both Cameroon and Nigeria, was destroyed in an attack by Boko Haram militants.

As a result of the bridge's destruction, hundreds of heavy-duty trucks transporting commodities between Chad and Nigeria were left stranded on both sides of the bridge.

On May 13, 2014, the House of Representatives called on the Federal Government to rebuild the Gamboru Bridge, which serves as a crucial link between the border town and other parts of Borno State.

== Incidents ==
On February 9, 2020, a tragic massacre occurred on the A3 highway in Auno, located between Damaturu and Maiduguri.
