= Philomath University =

- Motto: Latin: Passion for Learning
- Motto in English: "Passion for Learning"
- Type: Private
- Established: 8th of April, 2021
- Chancellor: Ibrahim Gambari
- Vice-Chancellor: Gylych Jelilov
- Faculty: 6
- Location: Abuja, Nigeria
- Campus: Urban
- Website: https://www.philomath.edu.ng/

Philomath University is a private multidisciplinary university established in 2021 and located in Abuja, Nigeria.

== History ==
The university was licensed by the National Universities Commission (NUC) on 8 April 2021 as approved by the federal government, and the university started with two faculties; the Faculty of Management and Social Sciences, and the Faculty of Law. Today, it has six faculties.

== Faculties ==
The university has the following six faculties:

- Law
- Social Sciences
- Management Sciences
- Natural and Environmental Sciences
- Computing and Information Technology
- Communication and Media Studies

== Award and scholarships ==
The university was named the best private university at the 2024 Social Impact, Enterprise, and Leadership (SEAL) awards. The university also awarded scholarships of up to 50% to prospective students.

== Gallery ==
Philomath University campus
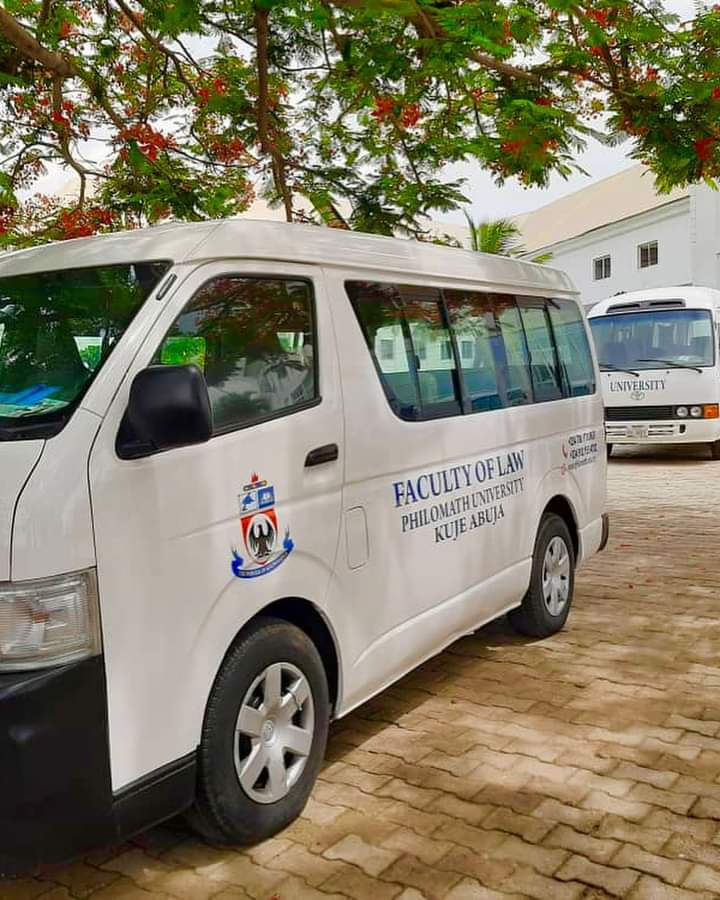
Philomath_University_School_Bus

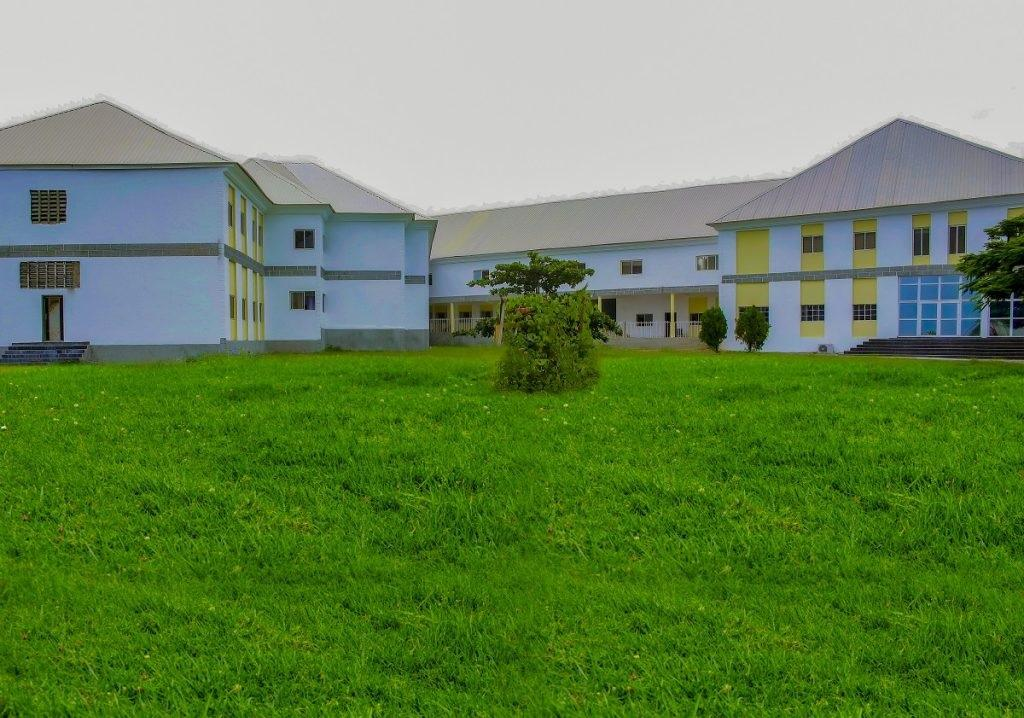
Faculties_in_Philomath_University

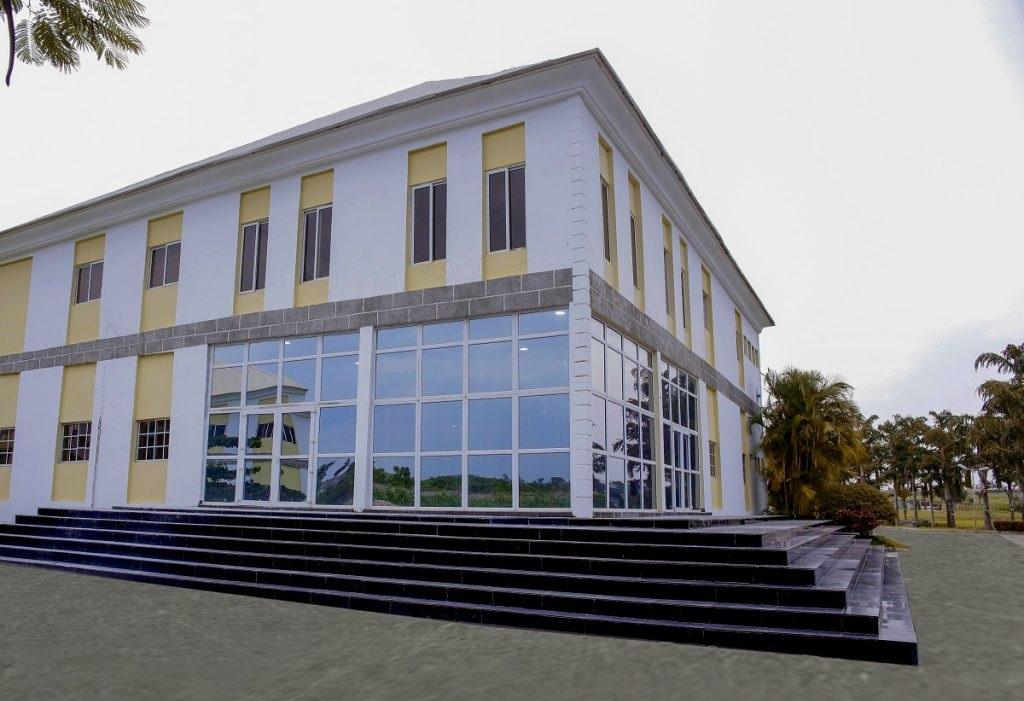
ENTRANCE-TO-LOBBY-AND-SCHOOL-RECEPTION

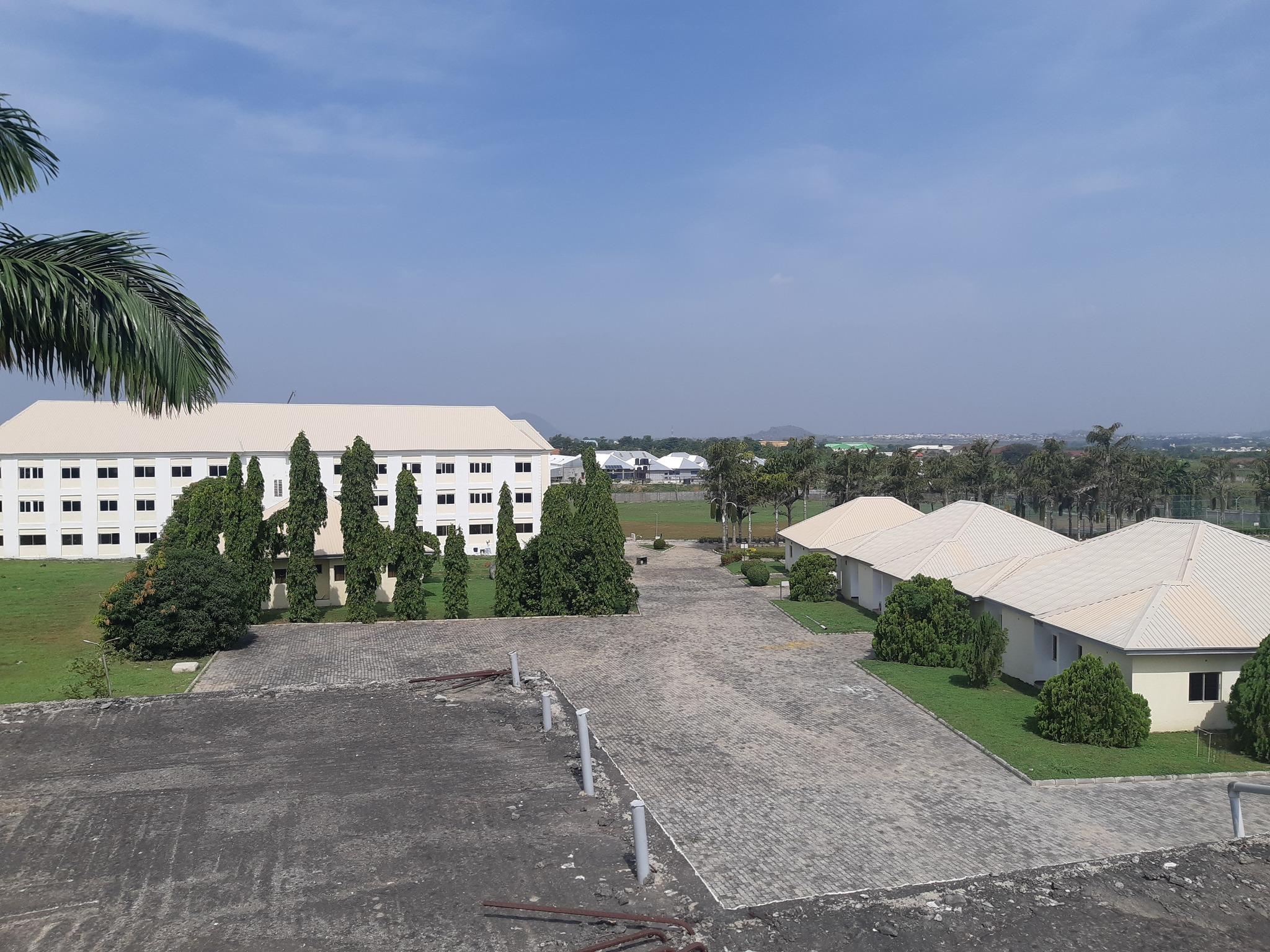
Aerial_View_of_Philomath_University

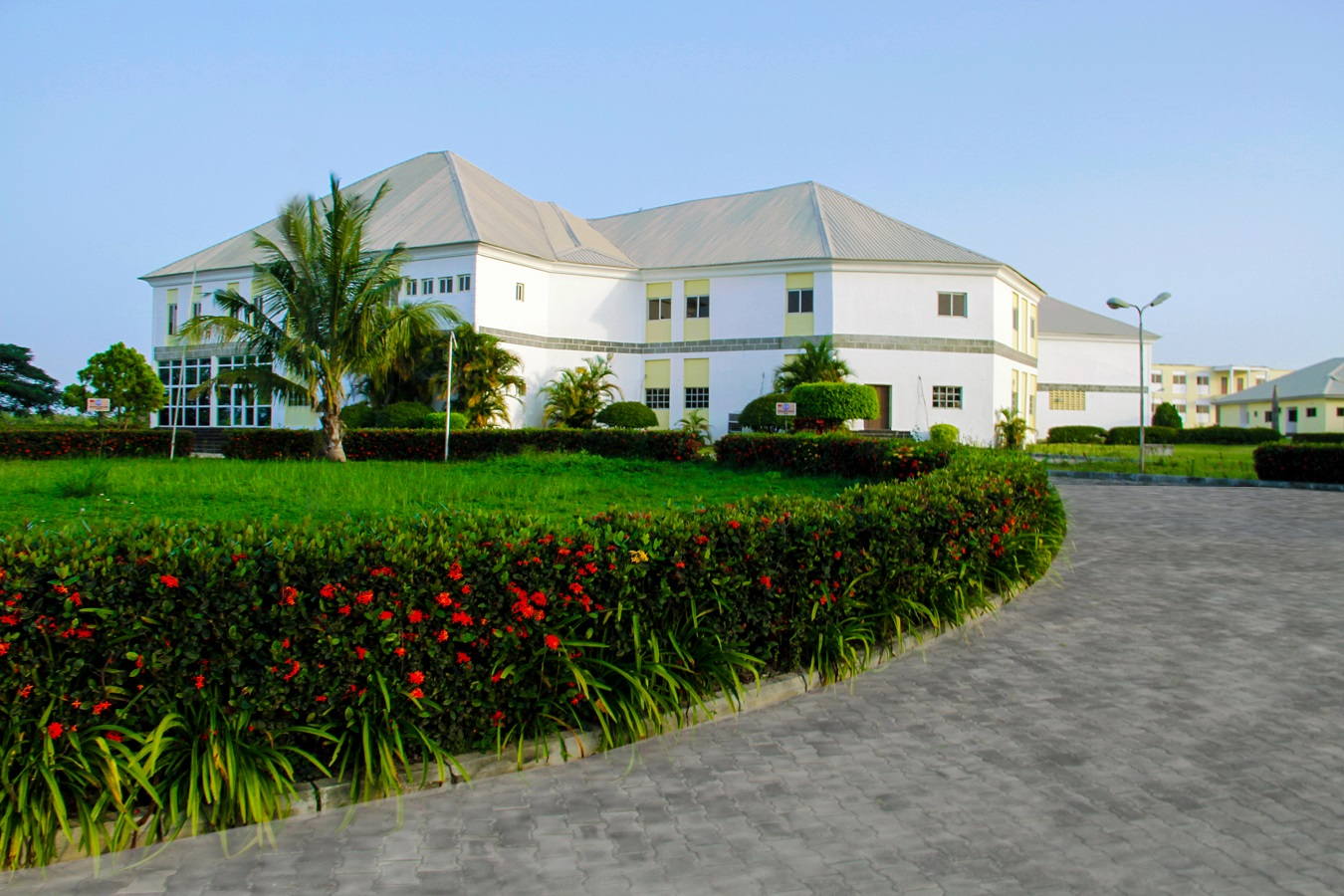
Front_view_of_the_Philomath_University

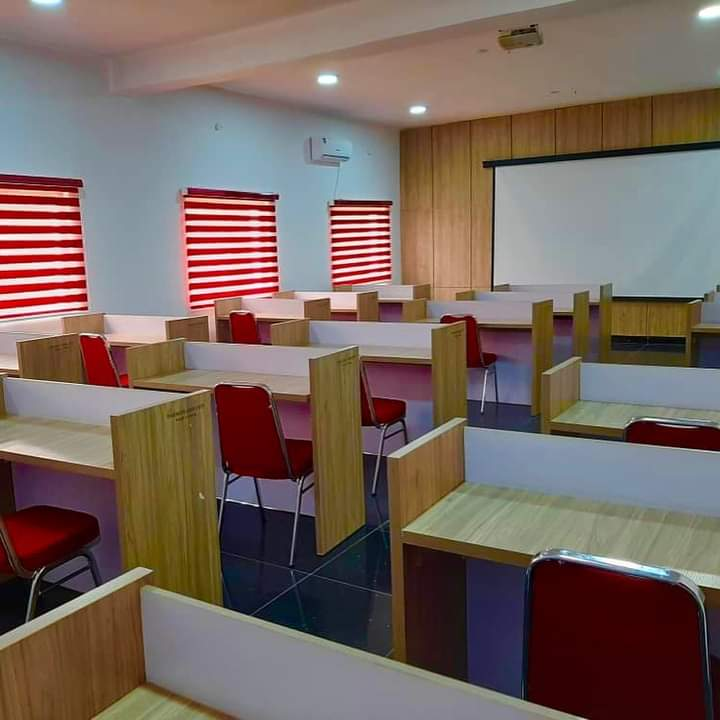
Philomath_University_Classroom

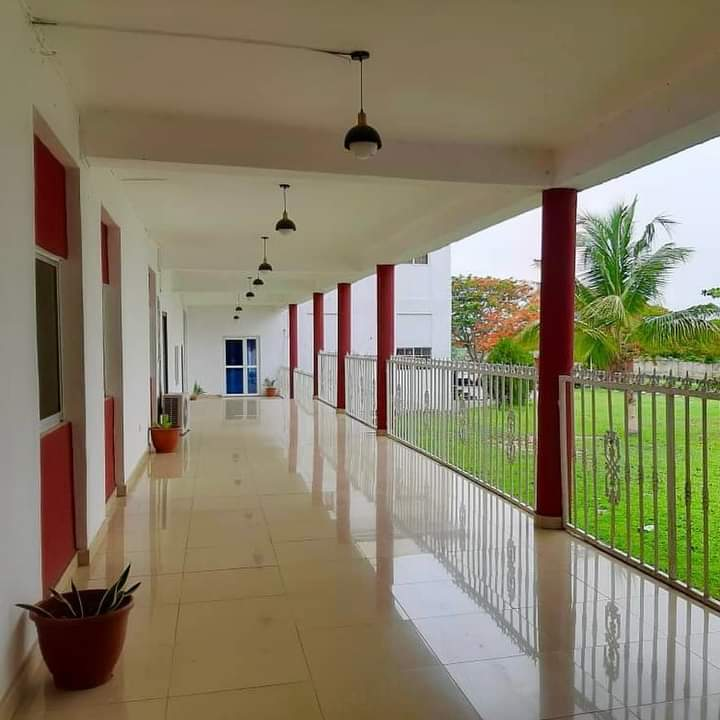
Philomath_University_Hallway

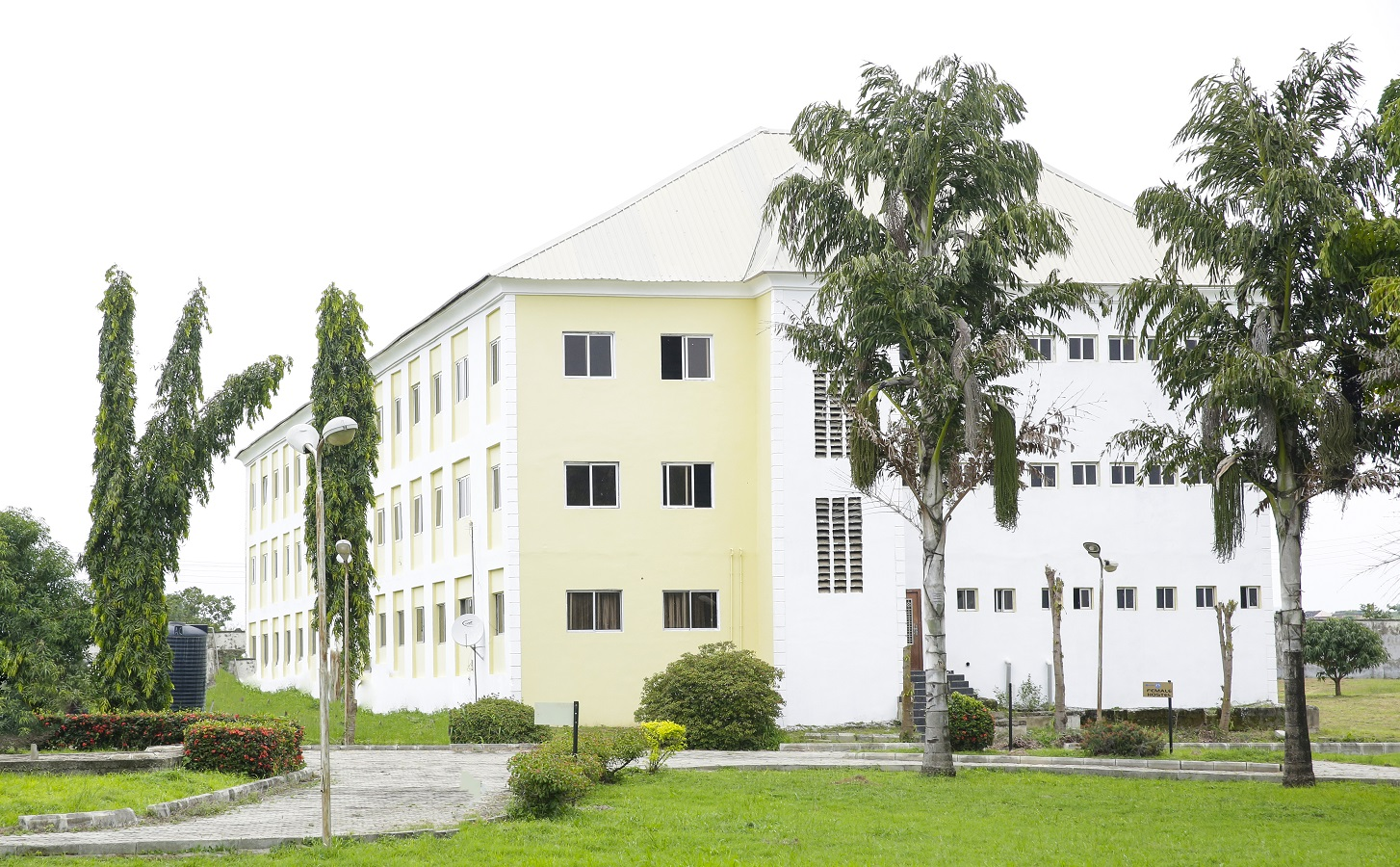
Philomath_University_Hostels

== News ==
The Pro-Chancellor of the university recently stated that Nigeria's 1999 constitution (as amended) is incapable of guaranteeing good governance. This has been debated highly on Nigerian TV stations. The university recently partnered with NADDC to improve student employability.
