= Yobe State =

State of Nigeria

Yobe
- State
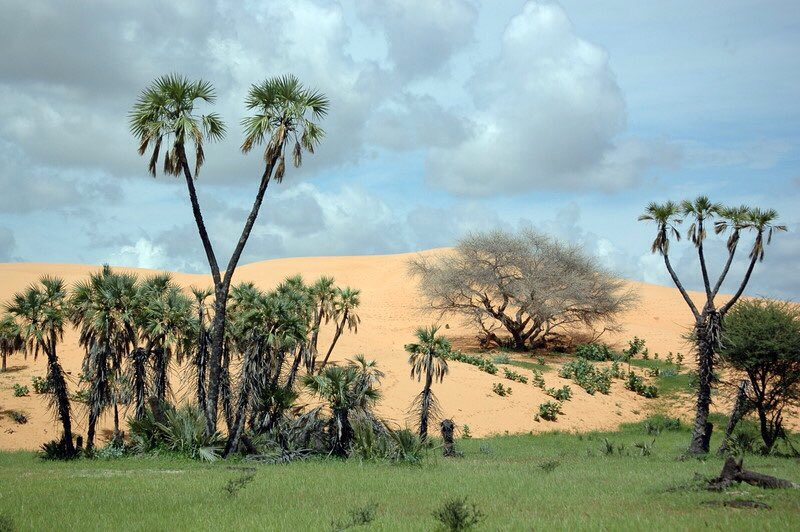
- Tulo Tulo, also known as 'The Desert Land of Hope', is a marshy oasis situated in a low valley in Yusufari on the fringe of the Sahara desert.

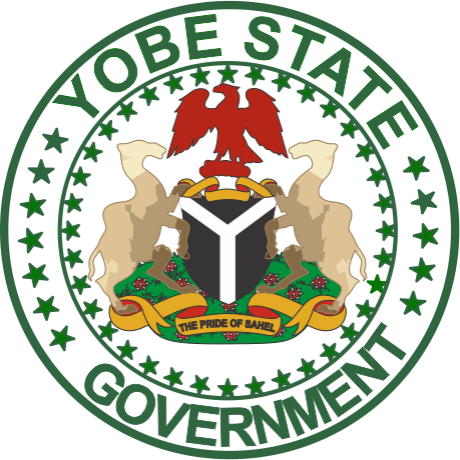
- Flag Seal
- Nicknames: Pride of the Sahel
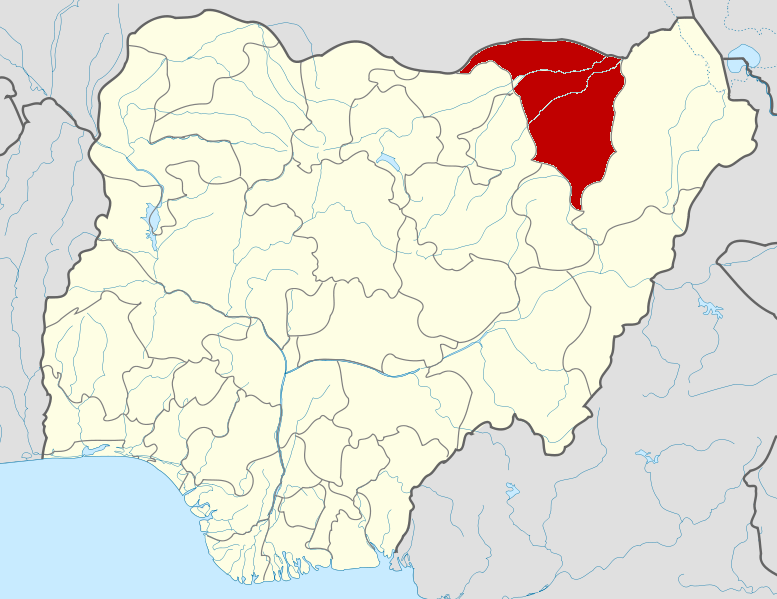
- Location of Yobe State in Nigeria
- Coordinates: 12°00′N 11°30′E
- Country: Nigeria
- LGAs: 17
- Date created: 27 August 1991
- Capital: Damaturu

Government
  - Body: Government of Yobe State
  - Governor (List): Mai Mala Buni (APC)
  - Deputy Governor: Idi Barde Gubana (APC)
  - Legislature: Yobe State House of Assembly
  - Senators: E: Musa Mustapha (APC); N: Ahmed Lawan (APC); S: Ibrahim Mohammed Bomai (APC)
  - Representatives: List

Area
  - Total: 45,502 km^{2} (17,568 sq mi)
  - Rank: 6th of 36

Population (2006 census)
  - Total: 2,321,339
  - Estimate (2022): 3,649,600
  - Rank: 32nd of 36
  - Density: 51.016/km^{2} (132.13/sq mi)

GDP (PPP)
  - Year: 2021
  - Total: $7.05 billion 36th of 36
  - Per capita: $1,797; 35th of 36
- Time zone: UTC+01 (WAT)
- postal code: 620001
- ISO 3166 code: NG-YO
- HDI (2022): 0.439 low · 31st of 37

Yobe is a state located in northeastern Nigeria. A mainly agricultural state, Yobe as created on 27 August 1991. Yobe State was carved out of Borno State. The capital of Yobe State is Damaturu, and its largest city by population is Potiskum, while the largest by land area is Fune. The Potiskum local government area is a place of farmers and marketers; one of the largest cattle markets in Africa is located in Potiskum.

== Geography ==
The state borders four states: Bauchi, Borno, Gombe, and Jigawa. Yobe State shares borders with Borno State to the east for about 421 km, Gombe State to the south for 140 km (in the vicinity of Gongola River), Bauchi State for 188 km (117 miles) and Jigawa State for 193 km (120 miles) to the west and the Republic of Niger to the north for about 352 km. It borders to the north the Diffa and Zinder Regions of Niger. Because the state lies mainly in the dry savanna belt, conditions are hot and dry for most of the year, except in the southern part of the state which has more annual rainfall.

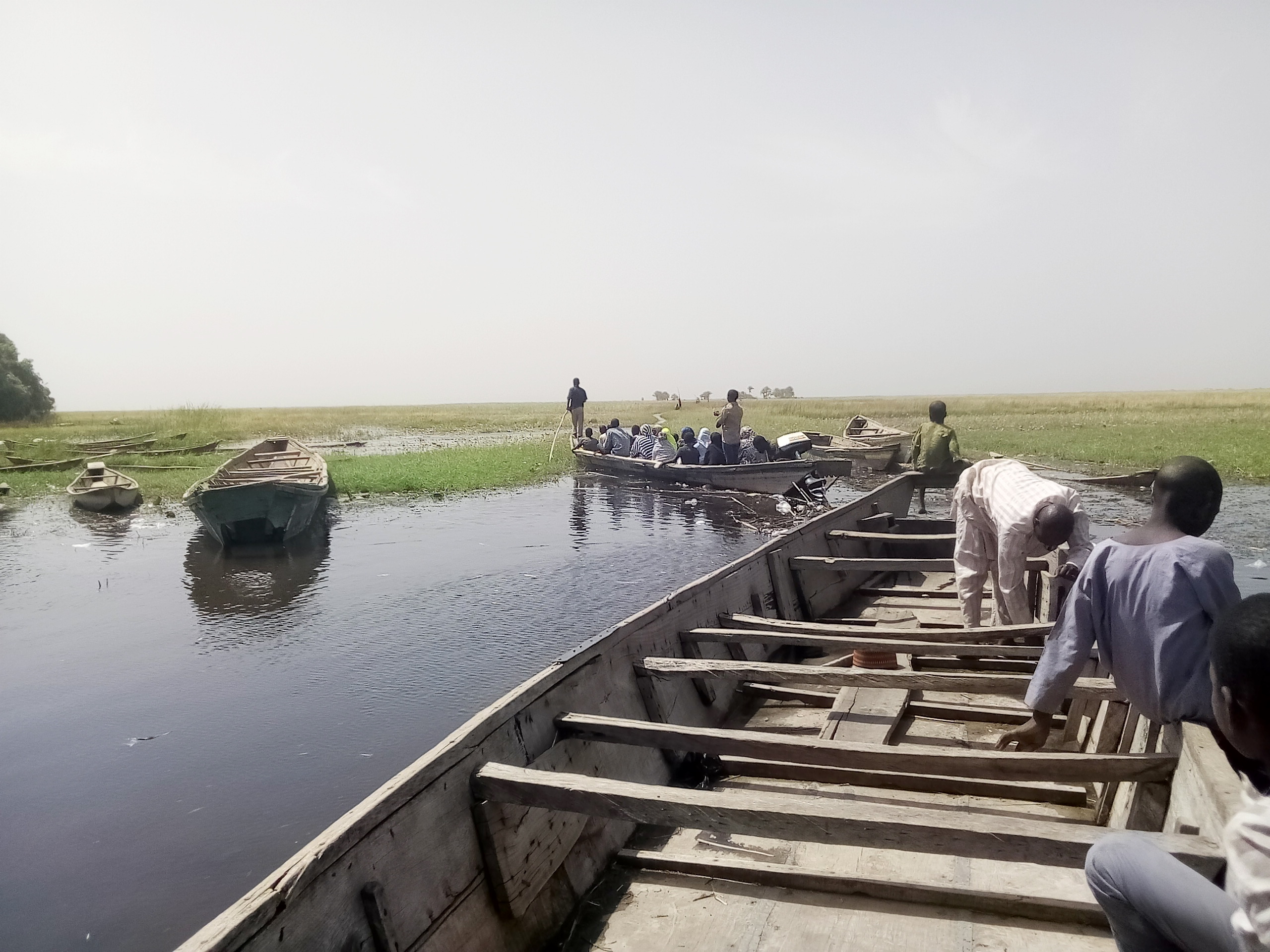
Nguru River bank Yobe State

=== Climate ===
The climate condition of Yobe is warm with daily temperature of 37 °C (98.6 °F). November being the sunniest month and rainy day is between August and December.

== History ==
Yobe State came into being on 27 August 1991. It was carved out of the old Borno State by the Babangida administration. Yobe State was created because the old Borno State was one of Nigeria's largest states in terms of land area and was therefore considered to be too large for easy administration and meaningful development. Ethnic rivalries within the old Borno State also contributed to the decision.

On 3 September 2024, Islamic State militants attacked a village in Yobe State, killing at least 130 villagers accused of collaborating with the Nigerian military.

== Boko Haram issues ==
On 14 May 2013, President Goodluck Jonathan declared a state of emergency in Yobe State along with nearby Borno and Adamawa States, due to the jihadist terrorist network Boko Haram's insurgency. Boko Haram's leader Abubakar Shekau was born in Shekau village of Yobe.

Boko Haram's attacks in Yobe include those in Damaturu in November 2011, December 2011 and June 2012, Gadaka in December 2011, Potiskum in December 2012, November 2014 and July 2015, Mamudo in July 2013, Gujba in September 2013, Buni Yadi in February and May 2014 and Dapchi in 2018.

== Local Government Areas ==
Yobe State consists of 17 local government areas (or LGAs). They are:

- Bade
- Bursari
- Damaturu
- Geidam
- Gujba
- Gulani
- Fika
- Fune
- Jakusko
- Karasuwa
- Machina
- Nangere
- Nguru
- Potiskum
- Tarmuwa
- Yunusari
- Yusufari

== Economy ==
While Yobe state is an agricultural state, it also has rich mineral deposits, including gypsum in Fika and kaolin in Fune local government and very rich agricultural resources as well. The State's agricultural produce include gum arabic, groundnuts, beans, and cotton. The State also has one of the largest cattle markets in West Africa, located in Potiskum.

== Governor ==
On 29 May 2019, Mai Mala Buni assumed office as the governor of Yobe State under the Party APC (All Progressive Congress) and Idi Barde Gubana is the Deputy-Gorvenor of the state.

== Ethnic groups ==
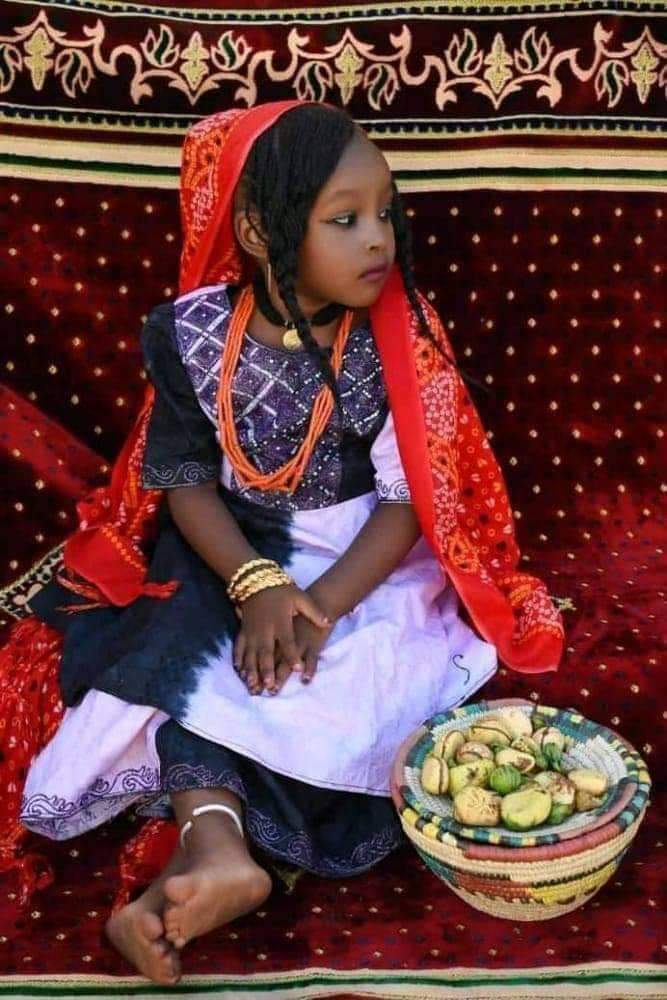
Kanuri girl sitting behind a decorated wall

The major ethnic groups living in Yobe state are the Kanuri and Karai-karai, Fulani, while other ethnic communities include Bolewa, Ngizim, Bade, Ngamo, Shuwa, Bura, Marghi, Hausa and Manga.

== Languages ==
Languages of Yobe State listed by LGA:

LGA	Languages
Bade	Bade, Duwai, Kanuri
Bursari	Kanuri
Damaturu	Yerwa Kanuri/kare-kare
Fika	Karai-karai, Bolewa Ngamo
Fune	Karai-karai, Ngizim, Bura-Pabir
Geidam	Kanuri, Fulani
Gujba	Kanuri, Karai-karai
Gulani	Maaka, Karai-karai, Bura-Pabir, Kanuri
Jakusko	Bade, Fulani, Karai-karai
Machina	Manga
Nangere	Karai-karai
Nguru	Kanuri
Yunusari	Kanuri
Yusufari	Kanuri
Karasuwa	Kanuri
Potiskum	Karai-karai, Ngizim, Bolewa

Other languages of Yobe State are Duwai, Shuwa Arabs, and Zarma etc.

== Tourist attractions ==
The tourist attractions sites in Yobe state include:

- Gooya Valley
- Ngazargamu
- Dagona Birds Sanctuary
- Gujba Forest Reserve
- Dufuna canoe
- Tulo Tulo Valley

== Education ==
Tertiary institutions in Yobe state include:

- College of Education and Legal Studies, Nguru
- Federal College of Education (Technical), Potiskum
- Federal Polytechnic Damaturu
- Federal University, Gashua
- Mai-Idris Alooma Polytechnic
- Shehu Sule College of Nursing and Midwifery, Damaturu
- Umar Suleiman College of Education
- Yobe State University

== Transport ==
=== Federal highways ===
- A3 east from Bauchi State at Baino via Potiskum and Damaturu to Borno State at Ngamdu as part of the Trans-Sahel Highway (Trans-African 5)
- A338 north from Gombe State at Ngalda as the Jangadoli-Fika-Ngalda Rd to Potiskum.

=== One road to Niger ===
The Nguru–Gashua–Damask road across the north of the state via Baiomari and Geidem to Maine-Soroa.

=== Other major roads ===
- the Gamawa Rd northwest from Potiskum to Bauchi State at Zindiwa,
- the Jakusko-Potiskum Rd north from Potiskum, where the Gashua-Jakusko Rd continues north via Katamma,
- the Dapchi-Damaturu Rd north from via Dapchi to Baiomari as the Damaturu-Gashua Rd,
- the Damaturu Rd south to Borno State at Kamuya Wuru,
- the Azare-Potisum Rd west to Bauchi State near Lele.

=== Railways ===
The 1067 mm Cape gauge Western Railway Line northeast from Kano via Jigawa State terminates at Nguru.

=== Airports ===
Potiskum Airstrip

== Religion ==
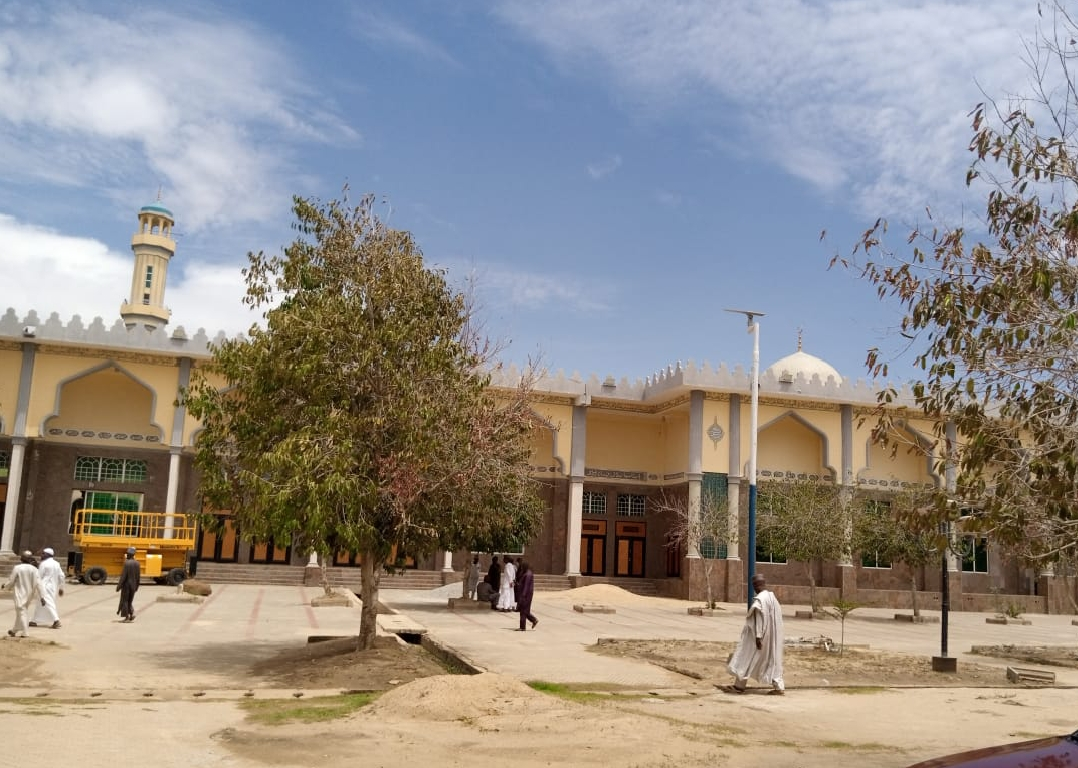
Central Mosque Damaturu

The inhabitants of Yobe are mainly Muslims and Sharia law was established in the state in 2000 by Governor Bukar Abba Ibrahim Dr. Engr. Mal. Zaji Buni is the current Director General of the Yobe Mosque and Islamic Center. However, there are Christians in the State although no Roman Catholic diocese has its seat in the state.

== Politics ==
The state government is headed by a Governor who is elected through a democratically process. The Governor works closely with the State House of Assembly, which is the law-making arm in the state.

Just like every other state in the Federal Republic of Nigeria, the electoral system of Yobe State is that of a modified two-round system. To be elected in the first round, a candidate must receive the plurality of the vote and over 25% of the vote in at least two -third of the State local government Areas. If no candidate passes this threshold, a second round will be held between the top candidate and the next candidate to have received a plurality of votes in the highest number of local government areas.

== Natural resources ==
Yobe State has deposits of trona and gypsum.

== Healthcare ==
The state's administration has improved healthcare delivery lifted a moratorium on hiring and provided incentives for staff retention. The free-drugs policy and decentralised drug supply have increased access to healthcare, underscoring the state's dedication to renovating and building new primary healthcare facilities to make healthcare more widely available and reasonably priced.

== Desertification ==
Residents of Yobe State in Northern Nigeria are worried about desertification because it could have a negative impact on their quality of life.

== Notable people ==
- Uwani Musa Abba Aji - CFR (born 7 November 1956) is a Nigerian Jurist and Justice of the Supreme Court of Nigeria
- Usman Albishir - (15 June 1945 – 2 July 2012) former senator and Senate Minority Leader
- Mamman Bello Ali - (1958 – 26 January 2009) former senator Yobe Zone B and former governor of Yobe State.
- Idris Alkali - former chief of administration, army headquarters
- Usman Alkali Baba (born 1 March 1963) current Nigerian inspector-general of police
- Ibrahim Mohammed Bomai - (born 10 February 1960) a politician and the Senator representing Yobe South Senatorial District in the 9th National Assembly
- Imrana Alhaji Buba - (born 6 August 1992) activist, social entrepreneur, recipient of Queen's Young Leader Award
- Audu Bulama Bukarti - (1 January 1984) senior analyst in the Extremism Policy Unit of the Tony Blair Institute for Global Change
- Mai Mala Buni - (born 11 November 1967) politician and the current Governor of Yobe State
- Goni Modu Bura - former deputy governor, former senator, and current ambassador of Nigeria to Syria and Lebanon
- Adamu Ciroma - (born 20 November 1934) former Minister and Governor of Central Bank of Nigeria
- Mala Mohammed Daura - Vice Chancellor, Yobe State University, Damaturu.
- Ibrahim Gaidam - former governor and now Senator for Yobe Zone A
- Buba Galadima - politician and National Secretary of the Congress for Progressive Change(CPC) party
- Bukar Ibrahim - (born October 1950) former governor of Yobe State and Senator in Nigeria
- Khadija Bukar Abba Ibrahim - (born 6 January 1967) member of the House of Representatives and Minister of State for Foreign Affairs
- Waziri Ibrahim - first republic minister and presidential candidate of GNPP in the second republic
- Alwali Kazir - former chief of army staff
- Ahmed Lawan - senator and Senate President of the 9th National Assembly
- Zakariya Maimalari - a brigadier-general, who was killed in the 1966 Nigerian coup d'état while commanding the 2nd Brigade, Apapa, Lagos
- Mahmoud Bukar Maina - (born 21 August 1986) a scientist, educator and science communicator
- Mamman Mohammed - medical doctor
- Adamu Garba Talba - a politician and former senator Yobe south
- Fatima Talba - a politician, former commissioner and member House of Representatives
- Adamu Waziri - (born 14 September 1952) former minister of Police Affairs
