= A4 highway (Nigeria) =

Road in Nigeria

Coordinates: 5.181257°N 8.353269°E

Trunk Road A4

Location
- Country: Nigeria

Highway system
- Transport in Nigeria

The A4 highway is a highway in Nigeria. It is a north–south route from the south coast to inland in the east of the country.

It runs from Calabar near the coast through Ikom in Cross River State; Katsina Ala in Benue State; Uto in Akwa Ibom State; Wukari in Taraba State; and Numan in Adamawa State — to join the A3 highway near Maiduguri in Borno State.

It also runs from Odukpani in Cross River State through Akwa Ibom State to the Southeast and Southwest of Nigeria

== See also ==
- Roads in Nigeria
