= List of tertiary institutions in Ogun State =

Ogun State is one of the 36 States of Nigeria with Abeokuta as the state capital. This list of tertiary institutions in Ogun State includes universities, polytechnics and colleges.

== List ==
- Babcock University, Ilisan Remo
- Bells University of Technology, Ota
- Chrisland University, Abeokuta
- Covenant University, Ota
- Crawford University, Igbesa
- Crescent University, Abeokuta
- Federal Polytechnic, Ilaro
- Federal University of Agriculture, Abeokuta
- McPherson University, Seriki-Sotayo
- Moshood Abiola Polytechnic
- Mountain Top University, Lagos-Ibadan Expressway, Nigeria
- Olabisi Onabanjo University
- Tai Solarin University of Education
- Abraham Adesanya Polytechnic
- Allover Central Polytechnic, Otta.
- Gateway Polytechnic Saapade
- Southwestern University
- Ogun State Institute of Technology, igbesa
