= 2014 Potiskum school bombing =

Terrorist incident in Nigeria

On 10 November 2014, a suicide bomber dressed as a student killed at least 46 and injured many people at school assembly at the Potiskum, north-eastern town of Nigeria which was carried out by Boko Haram.
