= Yobe State University =

State university in Yobe, Nigeria

- Motto: Knowledge Is Light
- Type: Public
- Established: 2006
- Vice-Chancellor: Professor Muhammad Bashir Tahir
- Administrative staff: 1300
- Undergraduates: 10,000
- Postgraduates: 2400
- Location: Damaturu, Yobe State, Nigeria; 11.678°N 11.946°E
- Campus: Urban
- Colors: Blue and white
- Website: ysu.edu.ng

Yobe State University is located in Damaturu, Yobe State, Nigeria. It was established under the Yobe State law in 2006 by Alhaji Bukar Abba Ibrahim, the then Executive Governor of Yobe State (1999-2007). The current Vice Chancellor of the university is Professor Muhammad Bashir Tahir, who assumed office on 28 February 2026 as Vice Chancellor.

== Management Board ==
1. Directorate of Affiliate Colleges Management Board

2. Vice Chancellor (Chairman)

3. Registrar (Member)

4. Librarian (Member)

5. Director of Works (Member)

6. Bursar (Member)

7. Director Affiliated Colleges (Member)

8. Director of Consultancy services (Member)

9. Dean PG school (Member)

10. Coordinator, Affiliated Colleges (Member/ Secretary)

== Faculties ==
- Faculty of Social and Management Sciences
- Faculty of Agriculture
- Faculty of Arts and Education
- Faculty of Sciences
- College of Medical and Health Sciences
- Faculty of Computing

== Programmes ==
Yobe State University offers courses at both undergraduate and postgraduate levels. The postgraduate courses offered by the institution at Postgraduate Diploma, Masters and PhD. levels are listed below.

Undergraduate programmes

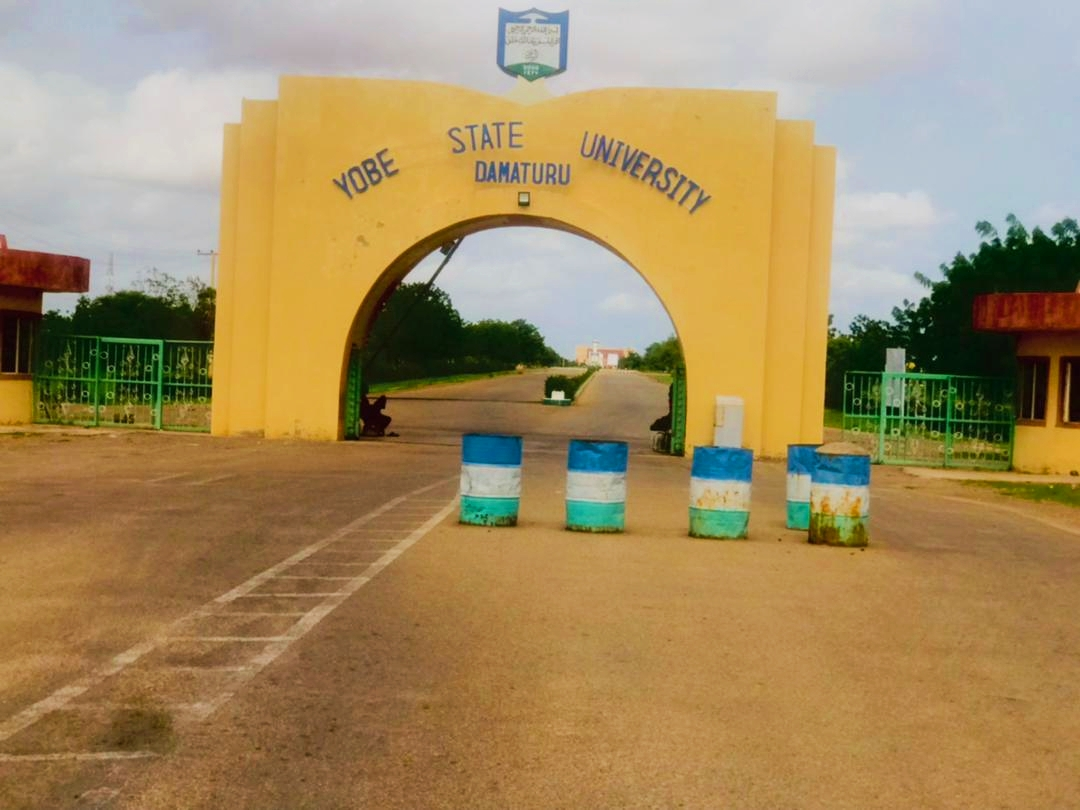
Entry gate of Yobe State University Damaturu

- Accountancy
- Agriculture
- Anatomy
- Arabic Studies
- Biological Science(s)
- Business Administration
- Business Education
- Biochemistry
- Chemistry
- Computer Science
- Economics
- Education and Biology
- Education and Chemistry
- Education and Economics
- Education and English Language
- Education and Geography
- Education and History
- Education and Islamic Studies
- Education and Physics
- Education Arts
- English Language
- Geography
- Geology and mining
- Hausa
- History
- Islamic Studies
- Shari'a Law
- Civil law
- Mathematics and Statistics
- Medicine and surgery
- Microbiology
- Physics
- Physiotherapy
- Political Science
- Public Administration
- Physiology
- Sociology and Anthropology
- Statistics
- Linguistics (English)
- Linguistics(Arabic)
- Linguistics(Hausa)
- Medical Laboratory Science
- . Nursing Science
- . Radiography
- Cyber Security
- Information Technology (IT)
- Criminology and Security Studies

Yobe State University postgraduate programmes.

- M.A. Arabic (3 semesters)
- PhD. Arabic (4 semesters)
- M.A. Islamic Studies (3 semesters)
- PhD Islamic Studies (4 semesters)
- M.A. (Ed.) English Language Education (4 semesters)
- PhD. English Language Education (6 semesters)
- PGD Chemistry (2 semesters)
- M.Sc. Chemistry (3 semesters)
- PhD. Chemistry (6 semesters)
- PGD GIS and Remote Sensing (2 semesters)
- M.Sc. GIS and Remote Sensing (4 semesters)
- PhD. GIS and Remote Sensing (6 semesters)
- M.Sc. Geography (4 semesters)
- PhD. Geography (6 semesters)
- PGD Management (2 semesters)
- M.Sc. Management (4 semesters)
- PhD. Management (6 semesters)
- PhD. Marketing (6 semesters)
- PGD Public Policy and Administration (2 semesters)
- PGD Banking and Finance (2 semesters)
- PGD Education (2 semesters)
- PGD Accounting (2 semesters)
- PGD Food Quality and Safety (2 semesters)
- PGD Local Government Administration (2 semesters)

== Gallery ==

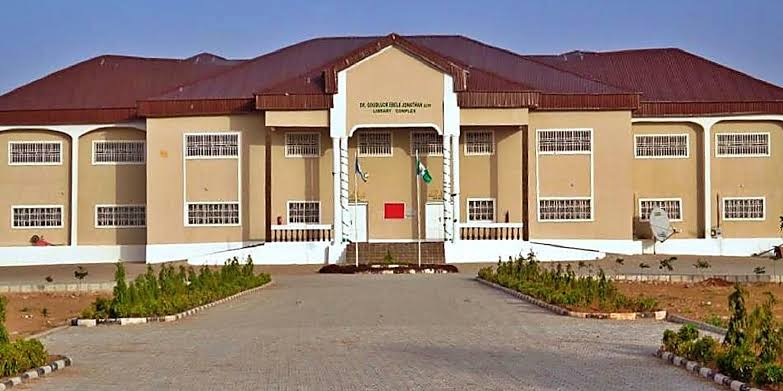

== See also ==
Academic libraries in Nigeria
