= Potiskum =

City and area in Yobe State, Nigeria

Potiskum Pataskuma, Pataskum
- City and LGA
- Interactive map of Potiskum
- Location in Nigeria
- Country: Nigeria
- State: Yobe State

Government
  - Type: Democracy

Area
  - Total: 559 km^{2} (216 sq mi)

Population (2006 census)
  - Total: 204,866
  - Estimate (2022): 322,100
  - Density: 366/km^{2} (949/sq mi)
- Time zone: UTC+1 (WAT)
- ISO 3166 code: NG.YO.PO

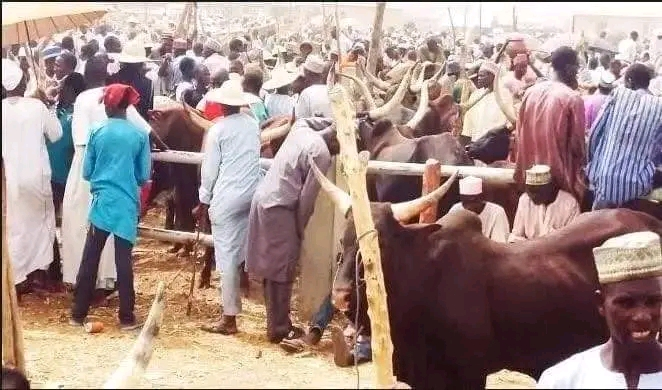
Potiskum cattle market

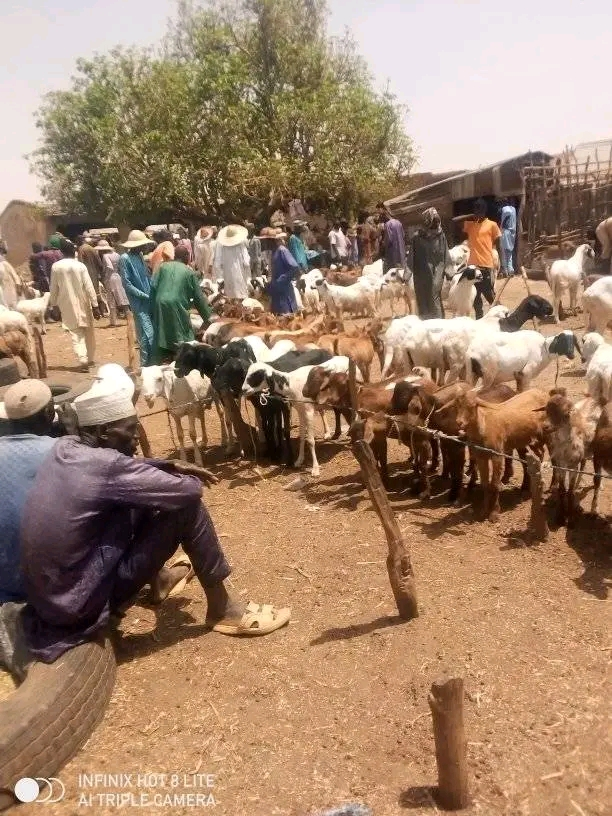
Goat and sheep market in Potiskum

Potiskum (also Pataskum) is a local government area and city in Yobe State, in the northeastern part of Nigeria. It's the largest, most populous and fastest growing city in Yobe State. Of the native languages in Yobe State, Potiskum is home to several major groups which include the Karai-Karai, Ngizim, and Hausa-Fulani. It is on the A3 highway at 11°43′N 11°04′E. It has an area of 559 square kilometres (216 sq mi).

Potiskum was organized by the Ngizim people, who had subjugated the Karai-Karai people. The state was formed in 1809 by a Chief of the Ngizim named Mai Bauya

== Traditional Emirate ==
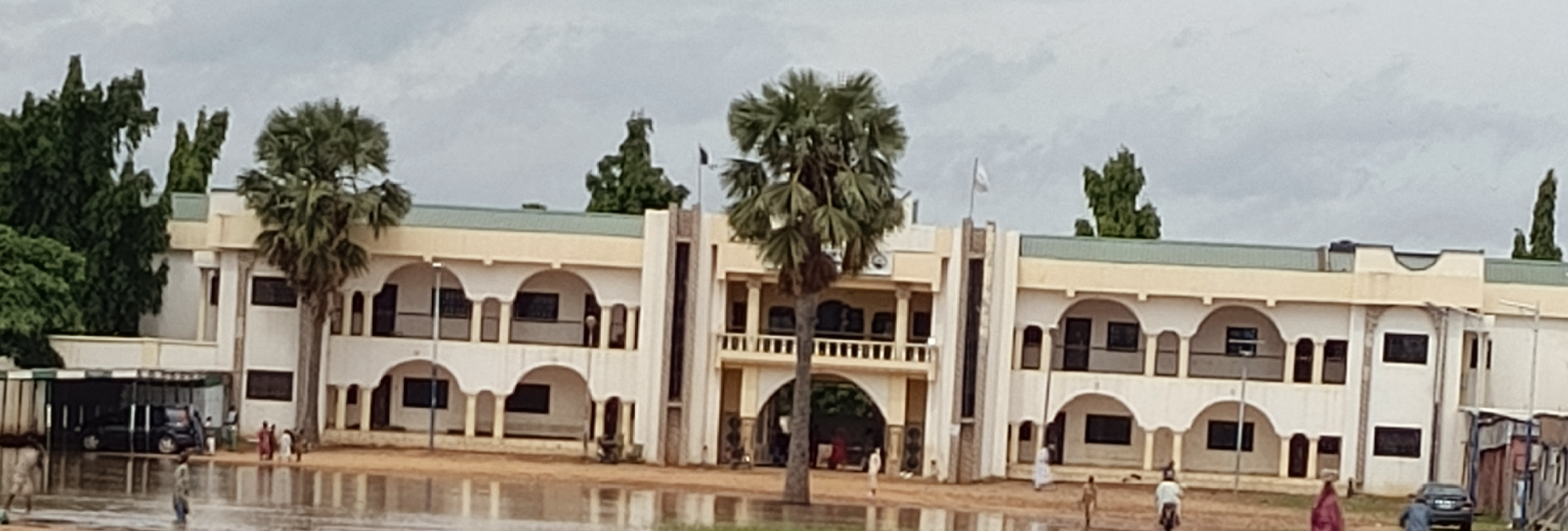
Potiskum Emir's Place.

The current Emir of Pataskum is Mai Umar Ibn Wuriwa Bauya Lai-Lai.

== Government ==
- List of wards in Potiskum

== Economy ==
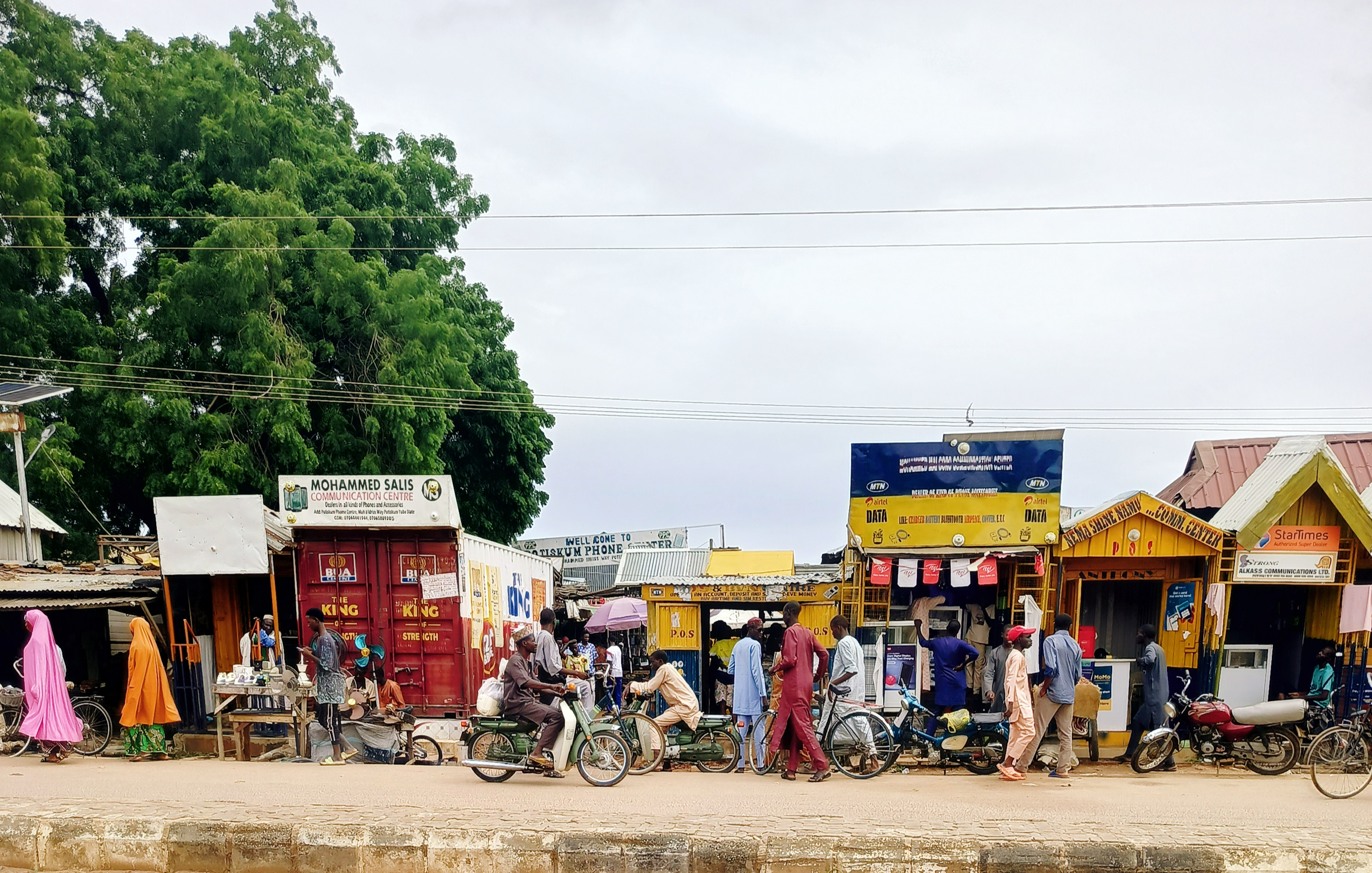
Potiskum GSM Market

Potiskum has been thriving as a trade hegemony in Yobe State because of its strategic position as a centre of commerce, learning, spiritual and cultural revival. People from Borno, Jigawa, Kano, Bauchi, and Gombe States, and numerous others from Niger, Chad, Cameroon, Benin, and Central African Republic have stakes in the 'biggest cattle market in sub-Saharan Africa' there. It also has one of the largest correctional facilities in Nigeria.

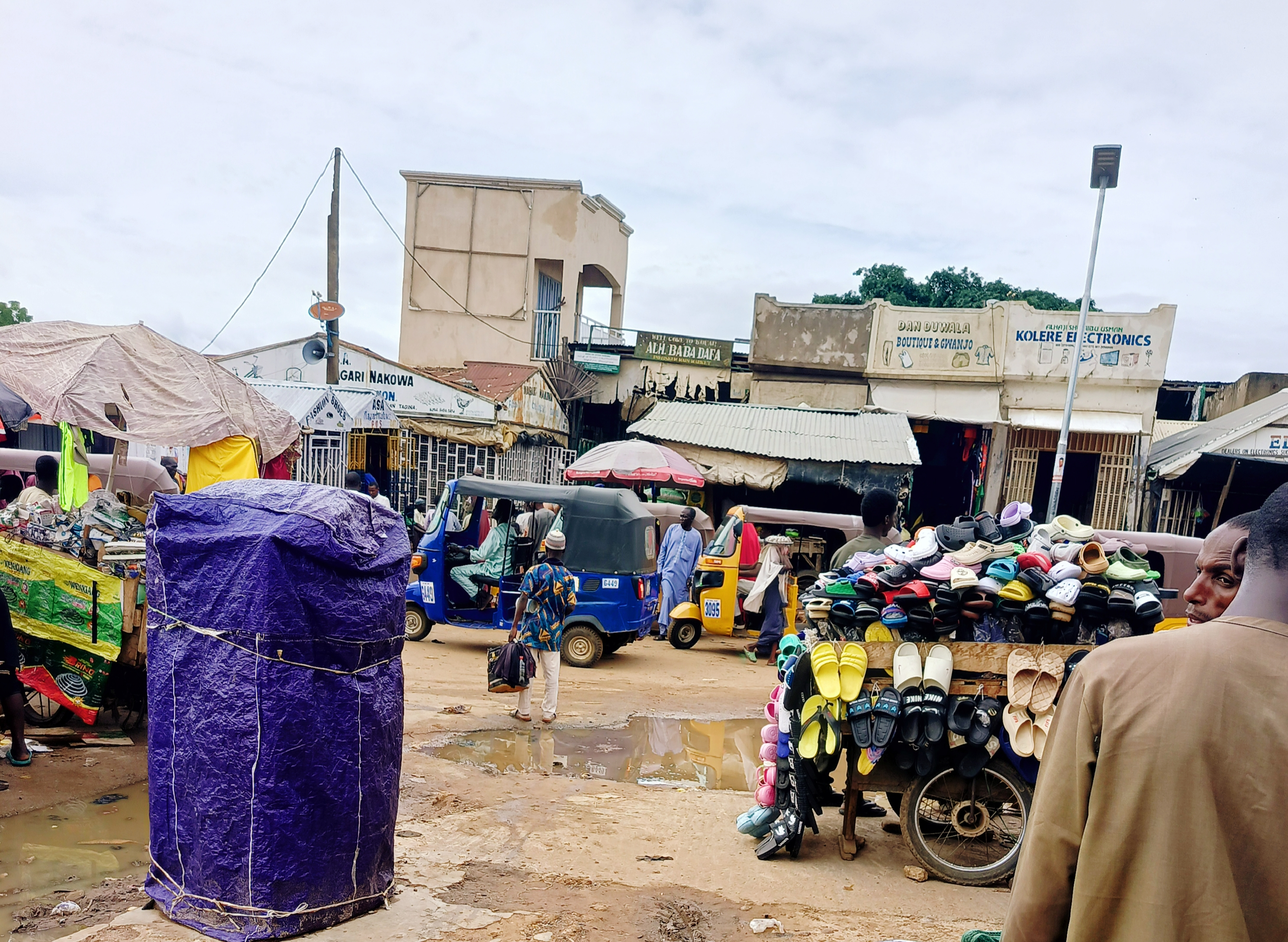
Potiskum Main Market

Therefore, Potiskum is known for the following markets:

=== Potiskum Cattle Market ===
Potiskum is the largest city in Yobe State with booming business in the area. It has one of the largest cattle markets in Africa and the largest in West Africa. Most of the cattle are transported to other parts of the country.

== Population ==
As of 2006, the population of Potiskum was 156,859. In 2022, the population of Potiskum stands at 483,346. As of 2023, the population of Potiskum was 511,885.

== Demography ==
Potiskum is projected to be the seventh fastest-growing city on the African continent between 2020 and 2025, with a 5.65% growth.

== Potiskum airstrip ==
Potiskum Airstrip is located in city's GRA from the western part of the town along Kano road. The Nigerian Airspace Management Agency (NAMA) office in the field, which is supposed to be responsible for the transmission of air traffic information to aircraft flying over the airfield, is not fully functional as the Omni-Directional Range Equipment installed there was not equipped with computers to enable the workers to spot planes over Potiskum. The airport came into being during the scramble for Africa by the colonialists because Potiskum was a sprawling town in the north which was earlier annexed by Germany before the United Kingdom took over. The aim of constructing the airport was to make the movements of the white men in and out of Potiskum easy because the town was also the gateway to other nearby towns in the north, which had enhanced trading activities and other associated commercial services in the region.

== Boko Haram attacks ==
In July 2009, Boko Haram members set a police station on fire during their uprising.

A May 2012 attack on the cattle market killed over 34 people, but appeared to be an attack by criminals seeking revenge, and not Boko Haram.

On 25 December 2012, a mass shooting occurred at a church.

On 3 November 2014, at least 30 people were killed in a suicide bombing at a Shia Muslim religious procession at Faydia Islamic school. Yobe State Governor Ibrahim Gaidam promised members of the Islamic Movement in Nigeria (ISMN) that he would demand full investigation of allegations of shootings of its members by soldiers deployed to the scene of the attack.

On 6 November 2014, sixteen men arrested by Nigerian Army soldiers were "found dead of bullet wounds hours later." (Another source puts the number at eighteen.)

On 10 November 2014 at least 46 boys were killed and 79 wounded, by a suicide bomber during a student assembly at the Government Senior Science Secondary School."

On 11 January 2015, four people were killed and over 40 were injured at Kasuwar Jagwal G.S.M market after an attack by two female suicide bombers, one of whom appeared to be about 15 years old. A bombing involving a parked car also occurred that day, killing two people and injuring one, at the Divisional Police Station.

On 13 January 2015, Governor Ibrahim Gaidam condemned the attacks, and "proposed the establishment of an Emergency Response Centre at the General Hospital in Potiskum." He stated that the medical bills for those injured in the attack would be paid, including those injured who had been transferred to other hospitals for treatment.

On 22 and 24 February 2015, suicide bombers killed 22 people.

On 5 July 2015, six people were killed in a suicide bombing.

== Climate ==
The wet and dry seasons are hot and unpleasant in Potiskum, with temperatures averaging 57 °F to 104 °F and infrequently dropping below 51 °F or rising over 108 °F.

From March 15 to May 23, the hot season, with an average daily high temperature exceeding 100 °F, lasts for 2.2 months. With an average high of 103 °F and low of 75 °F, April is the hottest month of the year in Potiskum.

From July 18 to September 27, the cool season, which has an average daily high temperature below 90 °F, lasts for 2.3 months. With an average low of 58 °F and high of 90 °F, January is the coldest month of the year in Potiskum.

Climate data for Potiskum (1991–2020)
Month	Jan	Feb	Mar	Apr	May	Jun	Jul	Aug	Sep	Oct	Nov	Dec	Year
Record high °C (°F)	41.2 (106.2)	42.5 (108.5)	43 (109)	46.1 (115.0)	43.5 (110.3)	42 (108)	38.5 (101.3)	39 (102)	38 (100)	39.2 (102.6)	40.4 (104.7)	39.2 (102.6)	46.1 (115.0)
Mean daily maximum °C (°F)	31.1 (88.0)	34.3 (93.7)	38.1 (100.6)	40.1 (104.2)	38.8 (101.8)	35.8 (96.4)	32.3 (90.1)	30.7 (87.3)	32.5 (90.5)	35.0 (95.0)	34.9 (94.8)	31.8 (89.2)	34.6 (94.3)
Daily mean °C (°F)	22.2 (72.0)	25.3 (77.5)	29.4 (84.9)	32.4 (90.3)	32.3 (90.1)	30.2 (86.4)	27.7 (81.9)	26.4 (79.5)	27.5 (81.5)	28.1 (82.6)	25.7 (78.3)	22.8 (73.0)	27.5 (81.5)
Mean daily minimum °C (°F)	13.3 (55.9)	16.3 (61.3)	20.6 (69.1)	24.6 (76.3)	25.7 (78.3)	24.6 (76.3)	23.0 (73.4)	22.2 (72.0)	22.4 (72.3)	21.1 (70.0)	16.5 (61.7)	13.7 (56.7)	20.4 (68.7)
Record low °C (°F)	5 (41)	4.5 (40.1)	9.5 (49.1)	13 (55)	13 (55)	15.1 (59.2)	18.7 (65.7)	18 (64)	16.5 (61.7)	12 (54)	10 (50)	5 (41)	4.5 (40.1)
Average precipitation mm (inches)	0.0 (0.0)	0.6 (0.02)	0.0 (0.0)	6.5 (0.26)	38.8 (1.53)	82.5 (3.25)	168.5 (6.63)	239.2 (9.42)	120.0 (4.72)	31.8 (1.25)	0.1 (0.00)	0.0 (0.0)	688.0 (27.09)
Average precipitation days (≥ 1.0 mm)	0.0	0.0	0.0	0.7	3.4	5.9	9.7	13.1	7.6	2.7	0.0	0.0	43.2
Average relative humidity (%)	18.6	14.6	14.5	29.5	48.2	61.4	72.9	82.7	81.5	64.5	32.8	23.4	45.4
Source: NOAA

== See also ==
- List of Local Government Areas in Yobe State

== Notable people ==
- Idris Alkali, former chief of administration, army headquarters
- Imrana Alhaji Buba
- Adamu Maina Waziri
- Adamu Ciroma
- Mamman Bello Ali
