= Damaturu =

City in northeastern Nigeria and capital of Yobe State

- LGA and city
- Interactive map of Damaturu
- Location within Nigeria
- Coordinates: 11°44′40″N 11°57′40″E
- Country: Nigeria
- State: Yobe State

Government
  - Local Government Chairman: Bukar Adamu (APC)

Area
  - Total: 2,366 km^{2} (914 sq mi)

Population (2006 census)
  - Total: 88,014
  - Estimate (2022): 137,900
  - Density: 37.20/km^{2} (96.35/sq mi)
- Time zone: UTC+1 (WAT)
- 3-digit postal code prefix: 620
- ISO 3166 code: NG.YO.DA

Damaturu is a city in northeastern Nigeria and the capital of Yobe State in northern Nigeria. It is the headquarters of the Damaturu Emirate.

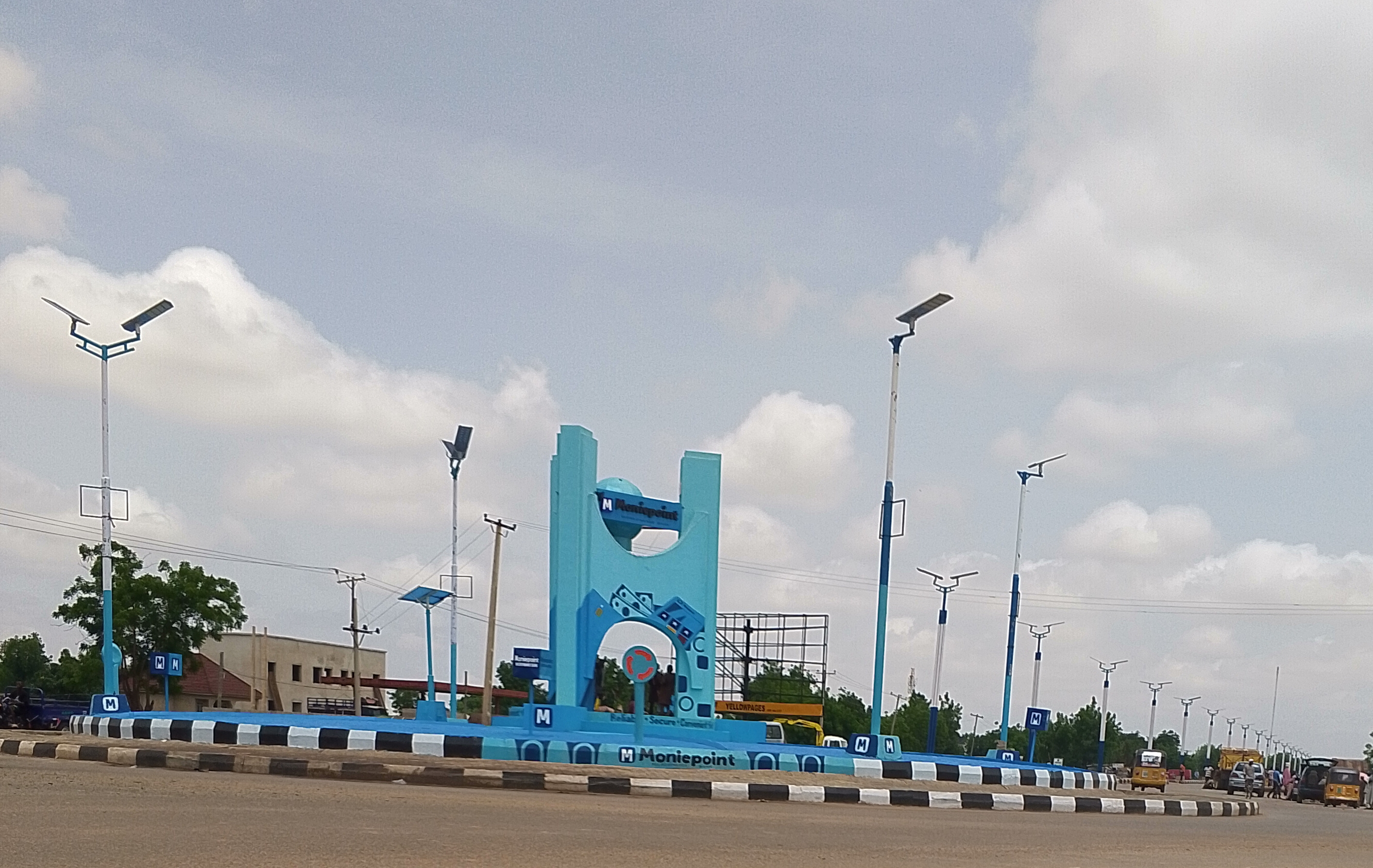
roundabout in Damaturu

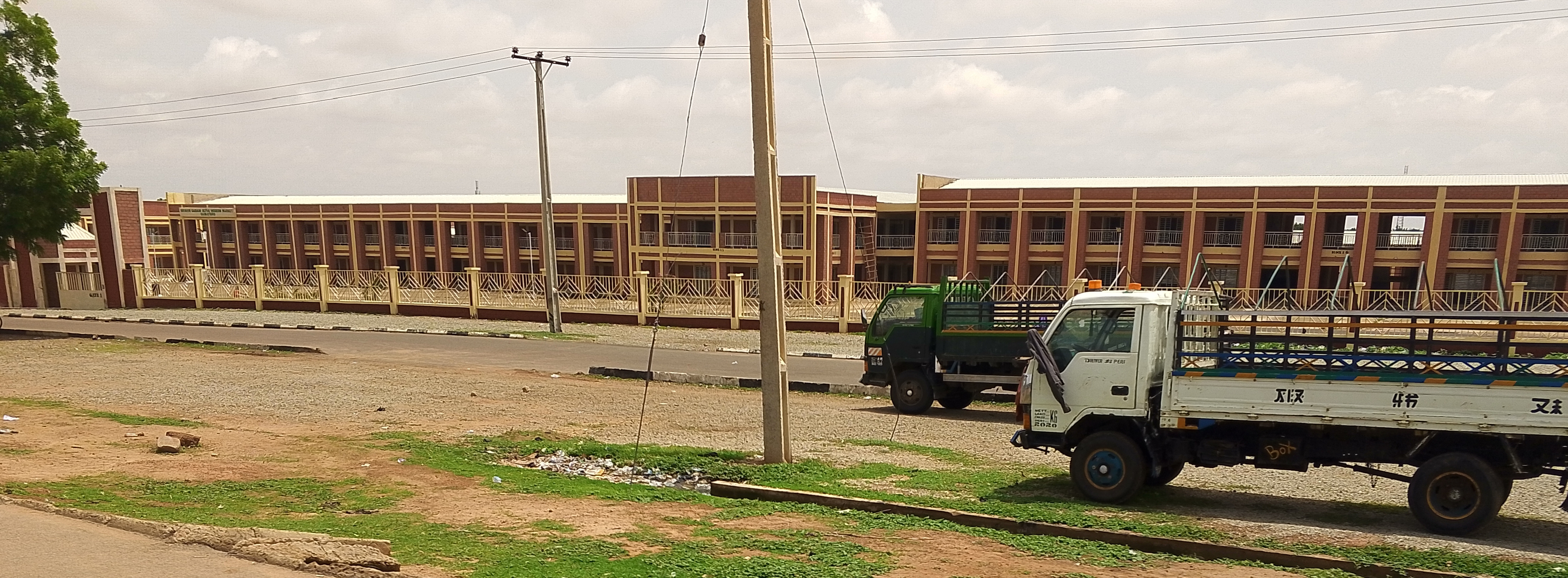
Ibrahim Gaidam Ultra-Modern Market in Damaturu.

Damaturu is the capital and administrative headquarters of Yobe State and where the governor resides and host to State Government Ministries, Departments and Agencies.

Damaturu hosts three tertiary institutions Federal Polytechnic Damaturu, Yobe State University and Shehu Sule College of Nursing. It is home to the Damaturu Central Mosque.

== History ==
Damaturu came into existence as a colony when it was carved out of the Alagarno district by the British. The British action resulted in the conquest of the Bornu Empire in 1902 by colonial forces under the command of Colonel Thomas Morland.

=== Boko Haram ===
Damaturu has been attacked many times by Boko Haram jihadist insurgents in their violent campaign to establish a caliphate in the northeast.

In November 2011, they killed over 100 people in a series of attacks.

In December 2011, they carried out two bombings.

In June 2012, 40 insurgents broke into a prison. 40 inmates escaped and eight people were killed.

In June 2013, insurgents attacked a school and killed thirteen people, including students and teachers.

In October 2013, militants engaged security forces in a lengthy gun battle and raided a hospital.

In December 2014, militants carried out attacks again. Gunshots and explosions were heard and a base of the riot police was reported to have been set on fire. Yobe State University also came under attack.

In February 2015, a teenage female suicide bomber killed 16 people at a bus station.

In February 2020, a massacre occurred in Auno on the Damaturu-Maiduguri highway. Insurgents killed 30 commuters, burned vehicles and kidnapped people.

== Geography ==
The postal code of the area is 620. The Local Government Area has an area of 2,366 km^{2} and a population of 88,014 at the 2006 census.

The town of Damaturu is on the A3 highway and in 2010 had an estimated population of 44,268.

The northeasterly line of equal latitude and longitude passes through the area, including 12°00′00″N 12°00′00″E in the north.

== Climate ==
The rainy season in Damaturu is scorching, oppressive, and primarily cloudy, whereas the dry season is unpleasant, windy, and partly cloudy. The average annual temperature ranges from 14 to 40 degrees Celsius or 58 to 104 degrees Fahrenheit, with 11 and 42.7 degrees Celsius or 52 and 109 degrees Fahrenheit being extremely rare. The greatest time of year to visit Damaturu for warm-weather activities, according to the tourist score, is from mid-December to early February.

=== Average Temperature in Damaturu ===
From 12 March to 23 May, the hot season, with an average daily high temperature exceeding 38 °C (100 °F), lasts for 2.4 months. In Damaturu, April is the hottest month of the year, with an average high of 40 °C (104 °F) and low of 24 °C (76 °F).

From 18 July to 26 September, the cool season, which has an average daily high temperature below 32 °C (90 °F), lasts for 2.3 months. In Damaturu, January is the coldest month of the year, with an average low of 14 °C (58 °F) and high of 32 °C (90 °F).

=== Cloud ===
Over the course of the year, Damaturu has notable seasonal change in the average percentage of the sky covered by clouds. In Damaturu, the clearer season starts about 6 November and lasts about 4.0 months, finishing about 5 March. The sky is clear, mostly clear, or partly overcast 61% of the time in January, which is the clearest month of the year in Damaturu. About 5 March is when the cloudier portion of the year starts, and it lasts about 8.0 months, finishing around 6 November. In Damaturu, May is the cloudiest month of the year with an average of 67% of the sky being clouded or overcast.

== See also ==
- List of Local Government Areas in Yobe State
