= 2007 Yobe State gubernatorial election =

2007 gubernatorial election in Yobe State, Nigeria

- April 14, 2007
Nominee	Mamman Bello Ali	Adamu Waziri
Party	ANPP	PDP
Running mate	Ibrahim Gaidam
Popular vote	210,166	186,399
Governor before election
Bukar Ibrahim
ANPP
Elected Governor
Mamman Bello Ali
ANPP

The 2007 Yobe State gubernatorial election occurred on April 14, 2007. ANPP candidate Mamman Bello Ali won the election, defeating PDP Adamu Waziri and other candidates.

== Results ==
Mamman Bello Ali from the ANPP won the election. He defeated Adamu Waziri of the PDP and others.

The total number of registered voters in the state was 994,380.

- Mamman Bello Ali, (ANPP)- 210,166
- Adamu Waziri, PDP- 186,399
- Zayanu Abagana, ADC- 34,052
- Tijani Tunsa, AD- 30,444
