= 1999 Yobe State gubernatorial election =

1999 gubernatorial election in Yobe State, Nigeria

- January 9, 1999
Nominee	Bukar Ibrahim	Baba Goni Machina
Party	All People's Party (Nigeria)	PDP
Running mate	Aliyu Saleh Bagare
Popular vote	150,688	140,948
Governor before election
Musa Mohammed
Military
Elected Governor
Bukar Ibrahim
All People's Party (Nigeria)

The 1999 Yobe State gubernatorial election occurred on January 9, 1999. APP candidate Bukar Ibrahim won the election, defeating PDP candidate.

== Results ==
Bukar Ibrahim from the APP won the election. PDP and AD candidates contested in the election.

The total number of registered voters in the state was 877,580, total votes cast was 317,243, valid votes was 294,572 and rejected votes was 22,671.

- Bukar Ibrahim, (APP)- 150,688
- PDP- 140,948
- AD- 2,936
