= 2015 Yobe State gubernatorial election =

Political event

The 2015 Yobe State gubernatorial election in Nigeria was held in February.

== Candidates ==
Incumbent governor Ibrahim Gaidam was elected deputy governor in April 2007 for the All Progressives Congress (APC), and was sworn in as governor in January 2009 after the death of Governor Mamman Ali. He has a background with the Certified Public Accountants of Nigeria (CPA) and at the time of the election was a Fellow of the Certified National Accountants of Nigeria (FCNA).

Adamu Waziri ran for the office for the newer People's Democratic Party (PDP).

== Background ==
Although other people appeared on the ticket, the race was between Gaidam and Ngama. Criticisms about the APC and Gaidam came from youth leader Alhaji Ado Bomboy, who said “the present administration has failed to implement the promises it gave the electorate, the inability of the present APC led government in the state to construct modern market, airport, provide accessible potable drinking water, youth empowerment among others as they promised.”

Waziri was defeated, receiving only 35% of the vote to Gaidam's 65%. Gaidam won 16 of the 17 local councils.

At the time of the election, the APC was in control of 20 Nigerian states, compared to 9 states controlled by the PDP. It would remain this way until the 2019 election, when the ratio became 17 APC states to 14 PDP states.

The election was held despite challenges arising in the insurgency of Boko Haram. Yobe, Borno, and Adamawa all faced voting issues related to counting the votes of internally displaced persons.
