= 2003 Yobe State gubernatorial election =

2003 gubernatorial election in Yobe State, Nigeria

- April 19, 2003
Nominee	Bukar Ibrahim	Adamu Waziri
Party	ANPP	PDP
Running mate	Aliyu Saleh Bagare
Popular vote	368,806	188,262
Governor before election
Bukar Ibrahim
All People's Party (Nigeria)
Elected Governor
Bukar Ibrahim
ANPP

The 2003 Yobe State gubernatorial election occurred on April 19, 2003. ANPP candidate Bukar Ibrahim won the election, defeating PDP Adamu Waziri and 3 other candidates.

== Results ==
Bukar Ibrahim from the ANPP won the election. 5 candidates contested in the election.

The total number of registered voters in the state was 966,749, valid votes was 560,576.

- Bukar Ibrahim, (ANPP)- 368,806
- Adamu Waziri, PDP- 188,262
- AD- 2,404
- Yakubu Bello, NDP- 786
- Muhammed Tsoho, UNPP- 318
