= 1999 Nigerian Senate elections in Yobe State =

1999 Nigerian Senate election in Yobe State

The 1999 Nigerian Senate election in Yobe State was held on February 20, 1999, to elect members of the Nigerian Senate to represent Yobe State. Mamman Bello Ali representing Yobe South and Usman Albishir representing Yobe North won on the platform of Peoples Democratic Party, while Goni Modu Bura representing Yobe East won on the platform of the All Nigeria Peoples Party.

== Overview ==
Affiliation	Party		Total
Affiliation	PDP	ANPP	Total
Before Election			3
After Election	2	1	3

== Summary ==
District	Incumbent	Party	Elected Senator	Party
Yobe South			Mamman Bello Ali	PDP
Yobe North			Usman Albishir	PDP
Yobe East			Goni Modu Bura	ANPP

== Results ==
=== Yobe South ===
The election was won by Mamman Bello Ali of the Peoples Democratic Party.

1999 Nigerian Senate election in Yobe State
Party	Candidate	Votes	%
PDP	Mamman Bello Ali		
Total votes			
PDP hold			

=== Yobe North ===
The election was won by Usman Albishir of the Peoples Democratic Party.

1999 Nigerian Senate election in Yobe State
Party	Candidate	Votes	%
PDP	Usman Albishir		
Total votes			
PDP hold			

=== Yobe East ===
The election was won by Goni Modu Bura of the All Nigeria Peoples Party.

1999 Nigerian Senate election in Yobe State
Party	Candidate	Votes	%
ANPP	Goni Modu Bura		
Total votes			
ANPP hold			
