= 2003 Nigerian Senate elections in Yobe State =

2003 Nigerian Senate election in Yobe State

The 2003 Nigerian Senate election in Yobe State was held on April 12, 2003, to elect members of the Nigerian Senate to represent Yobe State. Usman Albishir representing Yobe North, Mamman Bello Ali representing Yobe South and Usman Adamu representing Yobe East all won on the platform of the All Nigeria Peoples Party.

== Overview ==
Affiliation	Party		Total
Affiliation	PDP	ANPP	Total
Before Election			3
After Election	0	3	3

== Summary ==
District	Incumbent	Party	Elected Senator	Party
Yobe North			Usman Albishir	ANPP
Yobe South			Mamman Bello Ali	ANPP
Yobe East			Usman Adamu	ANPP

== Results ==
=== Yobe North ===
The election was won by Usman Albishir of the All Nigeria Peoples Party.

2003 Nigerian Senate election in Yobe State
Party	Candidate	Votes	%
ANPP	Usman Albishir		
Total votes			
ANPP hold			

=== Yobe South ===
The election was won by Mamman Bello Ali of the All Nigeria Peoples Party.

2003 Nigerian Senate election in Yobe State
Party	Candidate	Votes	%
ANPP	Mamman Bello Ali		
Total votes			
ANPP hold			

=== Yobe East ===
The election was won by Usman Adamu of the All Nigeria Peoples Party.

2003 Nigerian Senate election in Yobe State
Party	Candidate	Votes	%
ANPP	Usman Adamu		
Total votes			
ANPP hold			
