= 1991 Yobe State gubernatorial election =

1991 gubernatorial election in Yobe State, Nigeria

Yobe gubernatorial election
- December 14, 1991
Nominee	Bukar Ibrahim	Sadiq Maina
Party	SDP	NRC
Popular vote	127,935	104,542
Elected Governor
Bukar Ibrahim
SDP

The 1991 Yobe State gubernatorial election occurred on December 14, 1991. SDP candidate Bukar Ibrahim won the election, defeating NRC Sadiq Maina.

== Conduct ==
The gubernatorial election was conducted using an open ballot system. Primaries for the two parties to select their flag bearers were conducted on October 19, 1991.

The election occurred on December 14, 1991. SDP candidate Bukar Ibrahim won the election, defeating NRC Sadiq Maina. Bukar Ibrahim polled 127,935 votes, while Sadiq Maina polled 104,542 votes.
