= Alhassan Yakmut =

Nigerian sports administrator

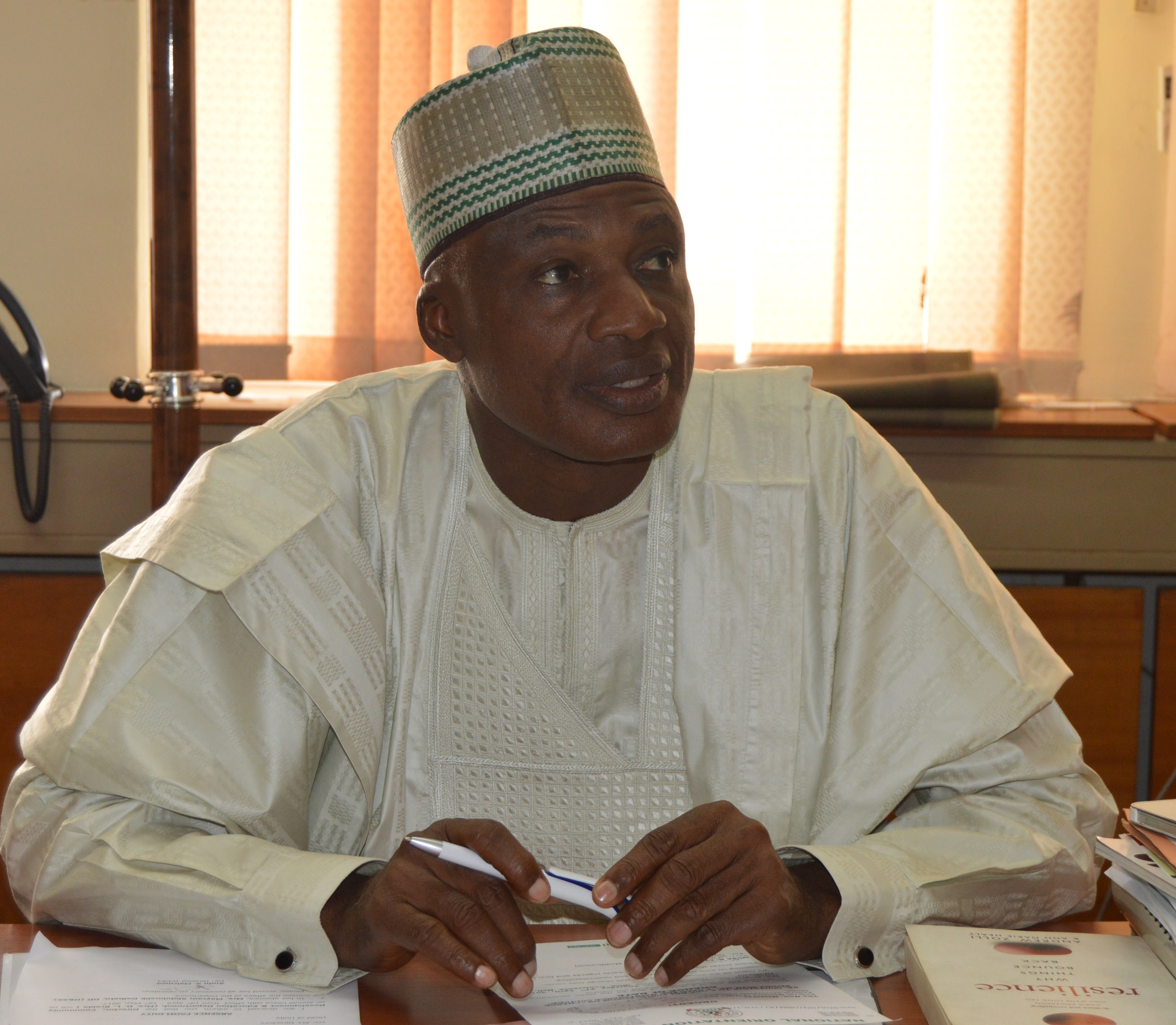

Director/Secretary to the Board on Civil Defence Corps, Correctional Services and Immigration Services, Ministry of Interior
- Incumbent
- Assumed office June 2018

Director, Planning, Research and Statistics
- In office 2017 – June 2018

Director, Special Duties, Ministry of Niger Delta Affairs
- Incumbent
- Assumed office 3 March 2016

Director-General, National Sports Commission
- In office April 2015 – March 2016
- Preceded by: Gbenga Elegbeleye

Personal details
- Born: 5 May 1961 (age 65) Ampang-West, Plateau State, Plateau State, Nigeria
- Education: L.E.A. Primary School, Ampang West, Plateau State. Boys’ Secondary School, Gindiri. Ahmadu Bello University. Obafemi Awolowo University, Ile-Ife. University of Nigeria, Nsukka, Enugu State. University of Jos, Plateau State. Academie Internationale des Sciences et Techniques du Sport, Lausanne, Switzerland. Business School, Netherlands

Mallam Alhassan Yakmut is a Nigerian professional Volleyball player and Sports administrator born on 5 May 1961 in Ampang-West, Plateau State; however he is from Mangu Local Government Area of Plateau State.

He was the last Director General of the now defunct National Sports Commission, a Muslim and a Senior Staff in the Nigerian Civil Service and a member of the Board of the Nigeria Volleyball Federation.

He is the Director/Secretary to Nigeria Security and Civil Defence Corps (NSCDC), Nigeria Correctional Services (NCS) - formerly Nigeria Prisons Services- and Nigeria Immigration Services (NIS) Board in the Ministry of Interior in the Nigerian government.

In 2017, he served as the Director Planning, Research and Statistics in the Ministry of Niger Delta Affairs. and Director of Employee Relations and Welfare in the Office of the Head of Civil Service of the Federation in the Nigerian government.

== Early life and education ==
He obtained a Primary School First School Leaving Certificate from L.E.A. Primary School, Ampang West in 1974 and West Africa School Certificate (WAEC) from Boys’ Secondary School, Gindiri, in 1979; all in Plateau State, Nigeria.

In 1981, he went to Ahmadu Bello University, Zaria, Kaduna to obtain a Diploma in Physical & Health Education and later got a Bachelor of Science in Physical and Health Education from Ahmadu Bello University , Zaria, Kaduna State in 1986. In 1990, he got a Masters in Administration of Physical Education and Sports from Obafemi Awolowo University, Ile-Ife, Osun State, and in 1998 a Post-Graduate Diploma in Marketing and Public Relations from University of Nigeria, Nsukka, Enugu State, and in 2001 a Certificate in Sports Event Management and Organization from Academie Internationale des Sciences et Techniques du Sport, Lausanne, Switzerland. In 2007, he obtained a Masters in Law and Diplomacy, University of Jos and a master's degree in Business Administration from Business School, Netherlands. In early 2017, he began a Doctor of Philosophy (PhD) degree in Law and Diplomacy in University of Jos, Plateau State, Nigeria, conducting a research on Good Governance and Economic Diplomacy: A case of Nigeria from 2009-2015.

== Career ==
In 1990, Alhassan worked as Senior Sports Officer, Federal Ministry of Youth & Sports, and in 1992 as Personal Assistant on Sports to the Honourable Minister, Federal Ministry of Youths and Sports Gen. Y.Y. Kure. In 1993, he worked as Personal Assistant to the Executive Chairman of National Sports Commission, Chief Alex Akinyele and Sole Administrator/Director of Sports, Plateau State Sports Council

In 1994, he worked as Sports Zonal Coordinator, North East and in 2005 the Sports Zonal Coordinator, North Central, in Federal Ministry of Sports and Social Development, Nigeria. In 1996, he was the Sports Zonal Coordinator, South East and Desk Officer, Marketing and Insurance in the Federal Ministry of Youth and Sports. In 2001, he was Secretary of the Professional Football League. Nigeria Football Association, and in 2007 as the Executive Secretary, Nigeria Premier League

Alhassan has served as Special Assistant to four Nigerian Honourable Ministers of Sports and Social Development; these include Ishaya Mark Aku (2002), Stephen Akiga (2004), Saidu Samaila Sambawa (2006) and Bala Kaoje (2007). In 2012, he worked as Director, Grassroots Sports Development Department. and in 2011 Acting Director Federations and Elite Athletes Department in 2010 and in 2010 Acting Director Sports, Planning, Research and Documentation Department, National Sports Commission, Nigeria.

In 2012, he obtained an Intermediate Olympics Committee (IOC) Advance Diploma in Sports and Administration. Since 2016, Al-Hassan has been a Fellow of the Institute of Corporate Administration, and from 1 May 2015, a member of the Commonwealth Advisory Body on Sports.

In April 2015, Yakmut was appointed Director General, National Sports Commission by then President Goodluck Jonathan, after for the former Director General, Gbenga Elegbeleye, was removed.

Under Yakmut's tenure as Director General of the National Sports Commission, Nigerian sports made great progress, finishing second at the 2015 African Games in Congo Brazzaville. Four years earlier in Maputo, Team Nigeria could only place third behind South Africa and Egypt at the end of the 10th All Africa Games.

Since 3 March 2016, Alhassan has been the Director of Special Duties in the Ministry of Niger Delta Affairs.
