= Ministry of Police Affairs =

Agency overview
- Formed: 1999; 27 years ago
- Type: Executive Department
- Jurisdiction: Federal Government of Nigeria
- Headquarters: 8th Floor, Federal Secretariat Complex, Shehu Shagari Way, Abuja
- Minister responsible: Ibrahim Gaidam
- Parent department: Government of Nigeria
- Child agency: Nigeria Police Force
- Key document: Section 217-220 of the 1999 Constitution of Nigeria
- Website: policeaffairs.gov.ng

The Ministry of Police Affairs is a Ministry of the Federal Government of Nigeria tasked with providing oversight to the Nigeria Police Force. The Ministry is headed by the Minister of Police Affairs, a cabinet-level head who reports directly to the President of the Federal Republic of Nigeria. The current minister is Ibrahim Gaidam.

== History ==
The concern to maintain internal security gave rise to the creation of the federal ministry of internal affairs in 1957. The police ministry was formed in 1999, with David Jemibewon being appointed Minister for Police Affairs in President Olusegun Obasanjo's first cabinet in June 1999. In 2007, the Ministry of Internal Affairs was merged with the Ministry of Police Affairs. In 2009, under the administration of Umaru Musa Yar'Adua, the ministries were demerged. In 2015 the Ministry of Internal Affairs were remerged with the Ministry of Police Affairs by order of President Muhammadu Buhari, resulting in the Ministry of the Interior. In 2019, after his re-eelction, President Buhari re-established a separate Ministry of Police Affairs. He made the decision “to improve the equipping of the police force with advanced technology and equipment that can facilitate their work.”

== Mandate ==
- Initiate, formulate and implement policies and programs relating to policing and internal security.
- Provide supervision and administrative support to the Nigeria Police Force (NPF), the Police Academy (POLAC) and the Nigeria Police Trust Fund (NPTF).
- Initiate, and implement projects and programmes that will enhance the welfare of police and provide enabling conditions for effective policing across the country
- Monitor and evaluate the overall implementation of policies, programmes and projects relating to policing.
- Liaise with organ of government on matters relating to Police Council.

== List of ministers ==
=== Ministers ===
- David Jemibewon (1999 – 2000)
- Stephen Akiga (9 February 2001 – May 2002)
- Magaji Muhammed (2003-2005)
- Fidelis Tapgun (2005-2007)
- Samuel Adewole Adejumo (2007-2008)
- Ibrahim Lame (17 December 2008 – March 2010)
- Adamu Waziri (6 April 2010 – 2011)
- Omoniyi Caleb Olubolade (2011 – 2013)
- Jelili Oyewale Adesiyan (March 6, 2014 - May 2015)
- Mohammed Maigari Dingyadi (2019 – 2023)
- Ibrahim Gaidam (since 21 August 2023)

=== Ministers of State ===
- Imaan Sulaiman-Ibrahim (August 2023 – October 2024)
