= Potiskum Emirate =

Pataskum Emirate
- Traditional state
- Location within Nigeria
- Coordinates: 11.72°N 11.07°E
- Country: Nigeria
- State: Yobe
- Emirate: Potiskum
- Established: 1809

Government
  - Emir: Umaru Bubaram Ibn Wuriwa Bauya

The Potiskum Emirate (or Pataskum Emirate) is a traditional state in Nigeria, with headquarters in Potiskum, Yobe State. The emir holds the title "Mai".

The emirate was founded in 1809 by the Ngizim or Ngizimawa people. In 1913 the British colonial rulers merged it into the Fika Emirate. In 2000 it was again made an independent emirate. Both the Fika and Potiskum emirates have their headquarters in the city of Potiskum.

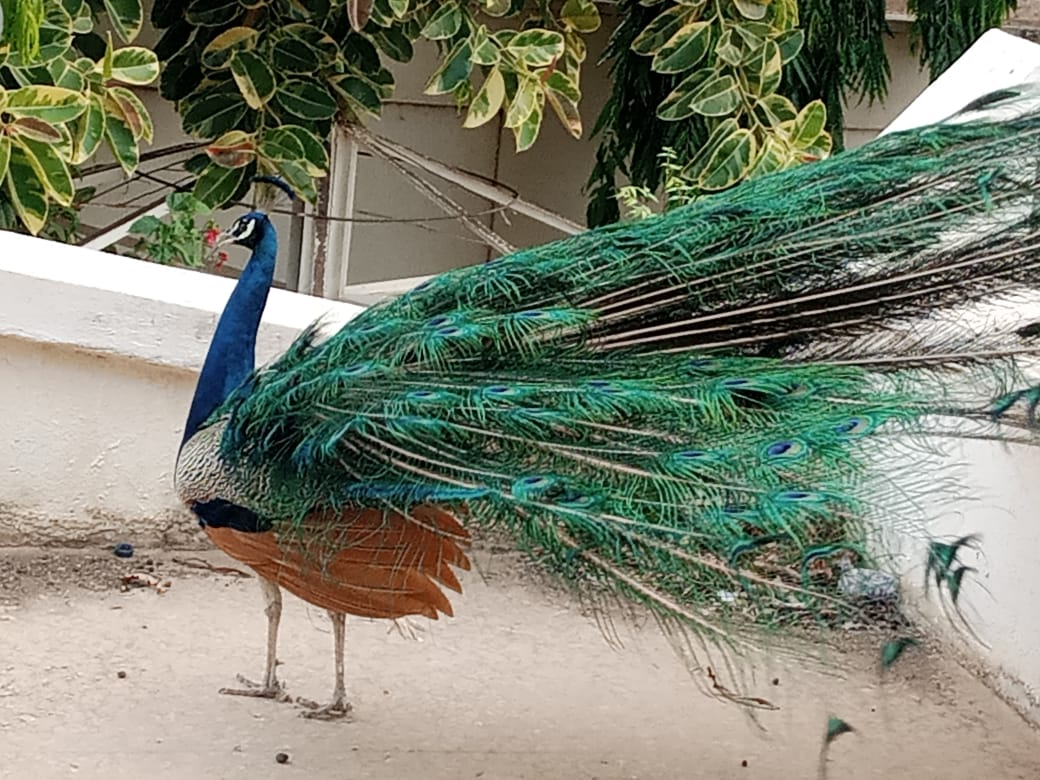
Royal Bird at Potiskum Emirates Palace, Yobe State Nigeria

== Original emirate ==
The Potiskum Emirate was organized by the Ngizim people, who had subjugated the Karakare people. The state was formed in 1809 by a Chief of the Ngizim named Mai Bauya or Buyan. In the 19th century people of the Misau emirate often raided the Kerikeri country. The Misau Emir Amadu (1834–1848) captured the capital, Potiskum. Usuman (1848–1861) and Sale (1861–1885) also raided the Kerikeri. In 1901 the Potiskum Emirate became part of the British Northern Nigeria Protectorate.

== Modern emirate ==
In his second term after the return to democracy, on 6 January 2000, Yobe Governor Bukar Ibrahim re-implemented the new emirates, adding Ngazargamo, Gujba, Nguru, Tikau, Pataskum, Yusufari, Gudi, Fune and Jajere. There had been only four emirates when Yobe State was created. Now there were thirteen. The Emir of Fika, Muhammadu Abali, protested at the break-up of his emirate and took the government to court, but eventually accepted the change.

In May 2007 the Emir of Potiskum, Umaru Bubaram Ibn Wuriwa Bauya, thanked the people for contributing N32 million of the N51 million used to build his new palace. The ultra-modern palace was commissioned by outgoing Governor Bukar Ibrahim. The palace was the scene of a gathering in January 2009 of political leaders including Senate President David Mark, former Senate Presidents Anyim Pius Anyim and Adolphus Wabara and many more, paying tribute to the governor of the state, Senator Mamman Bello Ali who had just died. In June 2010 the Emir of Potiskum gave the title of "Turakin Potiskum" to the state's former commissioner of finance, Alhaji Mohamed Hassan, in recognition of his contributions to the development of the state. In March 2011 Emir Umaru Bubaram gave his support to the campaign of Ibrahim Geidam for a second term as Yobe governor on the All Nigeria Peoples Party (ANPP) platform.

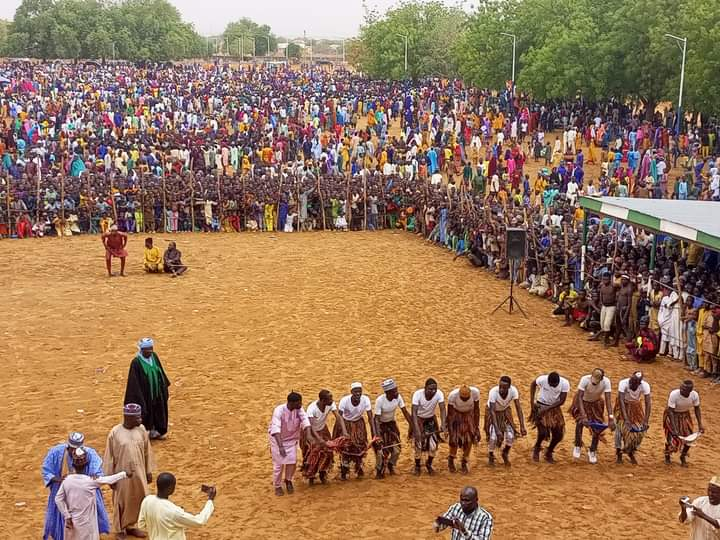
Traditional Dancers performing During 2023 Sallah Festival at Potiskum Emirate Palace Yobe State, Nigeria

In July 2010 Emir Umaru Bubaram supported a proposal by the Emir of Fika, Muhammadu Abali, to convert the old Potiskum Prison into a museum. In August 2012 during Ramadan the Pataskum Emirate Council distributed bags of millet and guinea corn to needy people under the Islamic Zakat program. The food had been donated by people of the emirate.

=== Attacks ===
In May 2012 more than thirty people were killed in an attack in the Potiskum Market. At first linked to Islamist insurgent group Boko Haram, it was later thought that armed robbers were responsible. Emir Umaru Bubaram visited the scene and condemned the attack.

==== Boko Haram ====
A mass shooting occurred at a church in Potiskum on 25 December 2012.

On November 3, 2014, a suicide bombing at a Shia march in Potiskum killed 15 people. On 10 November, a suicide bombing in a Potiskum secondary school caused the death of over 40 students. An angry mob refused to give soldiers or the State Police Commissioner access to the scene of the incident. The emirs of Fika and Potiskum said they had called on elders in their respective domains to educate the mob on the need to allow security personnel to operate.

On July 5, 2015 five people and the attacker were killed in a suicide bombing in Potiskum.

On January 14, 2020, a convoy of the Emir of Potiskum Umaru Bubaram and other travellers were attacked by gunmen on Kaduna-Zaria road causing the death of 30 people including four of the emir's aides. The emir escaped unharmed by quickly leaving his vehicle on the scene of the attack and trekking in the bush for two hours.

== Rulers ==
From 1809 to 1858 the rulers took the title Kachalla. They were:

- 1809–1817 Bauya I
- 1817–1820 Awany (Awani)
- 1820–1825 Kuduskunai
- 1825–1830 Dungari (Dangari)
- 1830–1832 Dawi (Dowi)
- 1832–33 Darama (Kunancibai)
- 1833–34 Mele
- 1834–35 Malam Bundi I (died 1835)
- 1835–1856 Mizgai
- 1856–1858 Jaji I

From 1858 the rulers took the title "Mai". They were:

- 1858–1866 Nego (Nejo)
- 1866–1893 Namiyanmda (Numainda)
- 1893–1902 Gabau (Gubbo)
- 1902–1909 Bundi II
- 1909 – 13 May 1913 Agudum

Rulers under the Fika emirate were:

- 1913–1919 Jaji II (1st time)
- 1919–1924 Vungm
- 1924–1927 Gankiyau
- 1927–1933 Bundi III
- 1933 (3 months) Jaji II (2nd time)
- 1933–1957 Bauya II
- 1957–1984 Hassan
- 1984–1993 Shuaibu

Rulers of the Pataskum emirate from 1993 to 1995 were:

- 5 June 1993 (53 days) Muhammad Atiyaye (b. 1934 – d. 1993)
- 5 August 1993 – 11 June 1995 Umaru Bubaram Ibn Wuriwa Bauya (b. 1942)

After an interregnum from 1995 to 2000, the emirate was restored on 6 January 2000. Rulers since then:

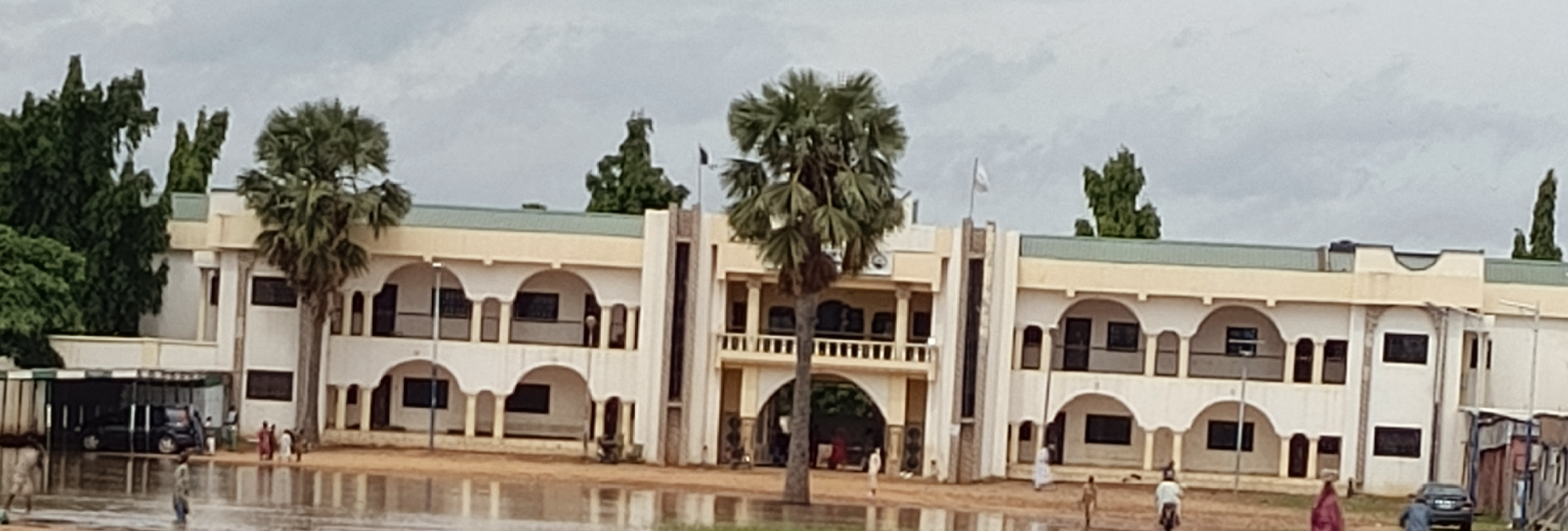
- Potiskum emirate's palace
  6 January 2000 – Umaru Bubaram Ibn Wuriwa Bauya (restored)
