= Bukola Olopade =

Nigerian sports administrator

Bukola Olopade is a Nigerian sports administrator. He served two terms as the Commissioner for Youth and Sports in Ogun State and was the chairman of the Local Organizing Committee for the 2024 National Sports Festival.

== Career ==
On November 14, 2024, President Bola Ahmed Tinubu appointed Olopade as the new Director General of the National Sports Commission. He is also the Chairman of Abeokuta Stormers SC.
