= EAS Airlines Flight 4226 =

2002 aviation accident

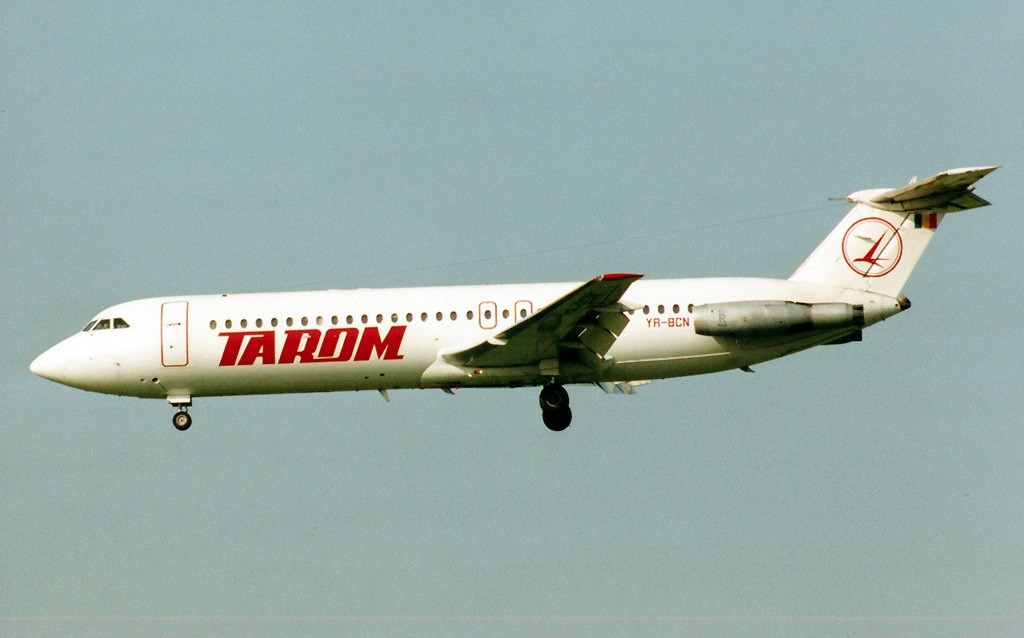
- The accident aircraft while still in operation with TAROM, pictured in 1992

Accident
- Date: 4 May 2002
- Summary: Runway overrun on takeoff due to pilot error
- Site: District of Ungwar Maja, Gwammaja, near Mallam Aminu Kano International Airport, Kano, Nigeria; 12°01′30″N 8°30′30″E
- Total fatalities: 149
- Total injuries: 47

Aircraft
- Aircraft type: BAC One-Eleven 525FT
- Operator: EAS Airlines
- ICAO flight No.: EXW4226
- Call sign: ECHOLINE 4226
- Registration: 5N-ESF
- Flight origin: Mallam Aminu Kano International Airport, Kano, Nigeria
- Destination: Murtala Muhammed International Airport, Lagos, Nigeria
- Occupants: 77
- Passengers: 69
- Crew: 8
- Fatalities: 71
- Survivors: 6 (5 passengers, 1 flight attendant)

Ground casualties
- Ground fatalities: 78
- Ground injuries: 47

EAS Airlines Flight 4226 was a scheduled domestic passenger flight from Kano to Lagos, Nigeria. On 4 May 2002, the aircraft operating the flight overran the runway on its takeoff roll and crashed into Gwammaja Quarters, a primarily Muslim densely populated residential area, located approximately three kilometres (1.9 mi; 1.6 nmi) from the airport. The aircraft burst into flames, resulting in the deaths of 71 occupants, with 6 surviving. In addition, 78 on the ground were killed. With a total of 149 fatalities, Flight 4226 is the deadliest aviation accident involving a BAC One-Eleven.

The Nigerian Accident Investigation and Prevention Bureau attributed the disaster to pilot error. The aircraft overran the runway and rolled for a few hundred meters. Dust kicked up by the plane's wheels was ingested by the engines, limiting their ability to deliver power. The extended landing gear further aggravated the condition, and the aircraft eventually crashed due to the compromised airspeed. Due to the absence of usable flight recorders, the reasons for the crew to accidentally overrun the runway could not be determined.

== Aircraft ==
The aircraft involved in the crash was a BAC One-Eleven 525FT with a registration 5N-ESF. The aircraft was manufactured in 1980 and was first delivered to TAROM with a Romanian registration of YR-BCN. In July 2001, the aircraft was acquired by EAS Airlines and entered the fleet in August. By the time of the crash, the aircraft had accumulated a total of 24,644 flight hours.

Two Rolls-Royce Spey turbofan engines powered the aircraft. The last major maintenance check was conducted in January 2001.

== Passengers and crews ==
Flight 4226 was carrying 69 passengers and 8 crew members. Among the passengers was Nigeria's Sport Minister Ishaya Mark Aku, on the flight to attend the 2002 FIFA World Cup warm-up match between Nigeria and Kenya. Julie Useni and Danjuma Useni, the wife and son of former Minister of Federal Capital Territory Jeremiah Useni, were also on board.

The commander of the flight, 49-year-old Captain Peter Abayomi Inneh, who had joined EAS Airlines in 2000 and had more than 14,000 total flight hours, of which 7,000 were on the BAC One-Eleven.The co-pilot was 47-year-old Chris Adewole Adegboye. He had accumulated a total of more than 8,000 flight hours, of which 3,350 hours were on the BAC One-Eleven. The flight engineers were Emmanuel Idoko and Muhammad Sarki.

== Accident ==
The aircraft started its takeoff roll from runway 05. Ground witnesses reported that the aircraft seemed to be accelerating slower than usual. The aircraft failed to lift off and overran the runway at a speed between V1 and VR, striking two runway lights. The landing gear struck a ground depression, causing a violent impact that rattled the entire aircraft, causing some parts of the ceiling in the cabin to come loose.

Approximately 210 metres beyond the end of the runway, the aircraft briefly became airborne, but its airspeed began to drop and entered a stall. Flight 4226 then began to swerve from side to side. The crew tried to prevent the aircraft from stalling by lowering the nose of the aircraft, but there was insufficient altitude to do so safely. The aircraft then clipped a minaret of a mosque and struck numerous houses and a local Islamic school. It then crashed into another mosque, bursting into flames. Praying services were being conducted at both mosques with at least 100 students in the school. Many buildings were destroyed, including the school and mosque.

== Casualties ==
In the aftermath of the crash, 149 people in total died, 71 on the plane and an additional 78 on the ground. At least 10 children reportedly perished in the accident. The corpses of the victims were transported to various hospitals in Kano. Most of the bodies were badly charred. (Note: The listed body count is based on the final report of the investigation. The official death toll, which is also included in the final report, stands at 103 deaths. However, the total number of fatalities based on the body count indicates a higher number of fatalities.) 56 bodies could not be identified, having been burned beyond recognition. A mass burial was held for the unidentified victims. Five passengers and one flight attendant survived the crash. In addition to the 78 people killed on the ground, 47 were injured. Of the 47, 23 suffered minor injuries whereas 24 suffered serious injuries.

Rescue workers stated that at least 30 homes had been destroyed in the crash. Nigerian Red Cross added that hundreds had been left homeless.

== Reaction and aftermath ==
Nigerian President Olusegun Obasanjo along with The Emir of Kano, Ado Bayero, and Governor of Kano State Rabiu Kwankwaso expressed their sympathies to the victims. Two days of national mourning was held, with Nigerian flags flown at half mast throughout the country.

President Obasanjo pledged a total of $86,000 federal funds to the victims of the crash, further stating that destroyed houses would be rebuilt. Spokesperson for Kano Government stated that the government of Kano would do "anything possible to alleviate their suffering". A relief committee consisted of 21 members was set up by Kano State. The committee would be in charge of collection and distribution of aids to the victims and would be headed by the deputy governor of Kano. Donations of up to 24 million Naira reportedly had been collected from the country.

The crash killed Nigeria's Sport Minister Ishaya Mark Aku. Following the death of Aku, the Nigerian Government appointed Nigerian Minister of Police Affairs Stephen Akiga as his successor. In response to the death of Ishaya Mark Aku, Nigeria Football Association cancelled the upcoming football friendly match between Nigeria and China.

A total of 56 bodies could not be identified due to their severe condition, most were burnt beyond recognition. Kano government eventually held a mass burial for the unidentified victims.

In response to the crash, Nigerian Minister of Aviation Kema Chikwe grounded every BAC One-Eleven in the country. In addition, the Nigerian government would no longer register aircraft that had exceeded 22 years old, adding that owners would be given 5 years to phase out the aircraft and remove them from service. A thorough review regarding the operation of private airliners in Nigeria would be also conducted.

== Investigation ==
Nigerian authorities opened an investigation on the crash, with Aviation Minister Kema Chikwe instituting a panel to investigate it. The Nigerian federal upper legislative chambers began a public session on the same day of the crash, discussing it as part of the investigation. Managing Director of EAS Airlines, Idris Wada, insisted that the aircraft was still in good condition. He later added that Lloyds Insurance, insurers of the BAC 1-11-500 aircraft which was involved in the crash, has sent a representative from London to investigate the cause of the crash. According to him, the aircraft involved in the crash was fitted with the engine of a grounded EAS Airlines BAC 1-11 aircraft four days before the crash, which raised questions among the senate. He claimed that the practice was not uncommon among the aviation industry.

Prior to the fatal crash, the aircraft involved in the incident had been grounded on two previous occasions regarding engine performance issues.

=== Runway overrun ===
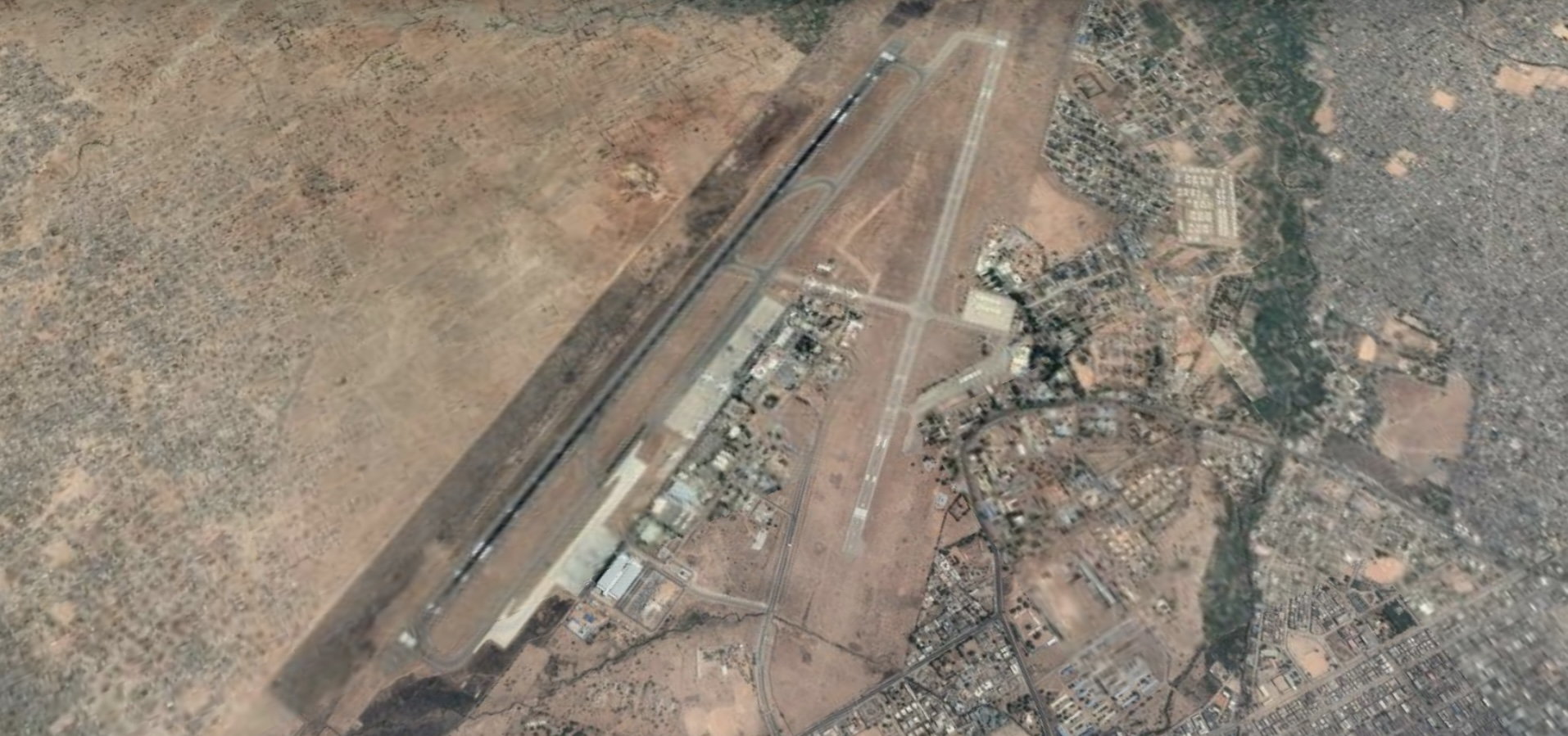
An overhead view of Kano Airport

Mallam Aminu Kano International Airport had two runways; Runway 06/24 and Runway 05/23, with Runway 06/24 being significantly longer than Runway 05/23. At the time of the crash, Runway 06/24 was being renovated, and as a result all aircraft were asked to use Runway 05/23 instead. Despite the change, the runway was long enough for the crew to conduct a safe take-off from Kano.

The cockpit voice recorder (CVR) and flight data recorder (FDR) were both heavily damaged by the impact and post-crash fire and were rendered unusable. Technicians were able to extract data from the FDR, but none of the data recorded was from flight 4226.

According to investigators, the most plausible hypothesis was due to the lackadaisical attitude of the pilots during the take-off roll. This was the first flight to Kano for both pilots. During the take-off roll, the crew did not take the shorter runway length into account. The crew were probably busy checking the engine parameters and aircraft instruments until they shifted their attention to the runway ahead of them. The take-off roll was slow, as per the testimony of the on-duty air traffic controller at the time. The airspeed was between V1 and Vr and the aircraft had used up too much runway distance during the takeoff roll. At this point, the crash was inevitable and the aircraft could not be stopped safely. The lack of judgement from both flight crew members caused the aircraft to overrun the runway. However, this theory could not be confirmed, as both the CVR and FDR were rendered unusable, giving the investigation team no data on the aircraft's performance or the conversations recorded in the cockpit. Therefore, the reasons for the runway overrun could not be definitively determined.

=== Cause of failed takeoff ===
Due to the limited data, investigators had to rely on eyewitness statements and survivor accounts. According to the air traffic controller on duty that day, during the take-off roll, the aircraft was moving sluggishly and was not at the usual speed required for take-off. Following the runway excursion, the aircraft traveled for approximately 148 metres (486 ft; 162 yd) before it finally took off from the ground. But before it managed to completely take off, the landing gear smashed onto a ground depression, which was used as a transformer pit for the approach lights. The impact kicked up large amounts of dust which were ingested by the engines, causing a reduction of thrust. The dust settled in the engine turbines between the crevices of the compressor casings. This resulted in the momentary degradation of the engine's ability to produce thrust. With the degraded performance of the engine, the aircraft could not gain altitude quickly enough.

The aircraft's poor performance at gaining altitude was worsened by the configuration of the aircraft. When it lifted off the ground, the landing gear was still in the extended position. The landing gear is normally retracted shortly after takeoff. The violent impacts created when the aircraft overran the runway could have created a startle response in the crew, causing them to fail to raise the gear. The landing gear down position would have diminished the aircraft's ability to climb adequately. The performance chart of the aircraft showed that with the landing gear lowered, the climb rate of the aircraft during takeoff would be reduced by up to 150 feet per minute (46 m/min). Due to the low altitude of the aircraft, the inability to gain altitude, and the reduced performance of the aircraft, the aircraft ended up crashing into the ground.

=== Other findings ===
The investigation also revealed problems regarding the operation of EAS Airlines, particularly on the maintenance culture and the oversight system of Nigeria's aviation industry at the time. The review regarding such issue was conducted with assistance from ICAO and members of United Kingdom's Baines-Simmons. The review discovered that the two certifying engineers who worked on the involved aircraft had been working without adequate breaks. There was no indication that the CVR and the FDR had been inspected on a daily basis and some maintenance data were left uncompleted. EAS Airlines also imposed the practice of maintaining their fleet by cannibalizing one unairworthy aircraft.

Despite the findings, investigators stated that there was no evidence that maintenance error had played a role in the crash. However, according to investigators, incomplete entries related to maintenance in the aircraft's logbook were not an uncommon occurrence. The ruling aviation authority body of Nigeria, NCAA, had not paid enough attention to the country's aviation industry. It was revealed that the NCAA had a ramp inspection plan, but it lacked detailed scrutiny to determine aircraft airworthiness.

=== Conclusion ===
The final report published by the AIPB attributed the crash to pilot error, primarily due to the crew failing to get the aircraft airborne due to a breakdown in communication and cockpit resource management and once airborne, thinking of ways to solve the problem. As a result of the accident, the AIPB recommended improvements related to supervision, stricter penalties for malpractices, as well as improvements related to aircraft flight recorders, in which the NCAA should not register an aircraft under Nigerian registration if an aircraft has not been fitted with a digital flight recorder. The NCAA also made sure that only operators who have the required spare parts are allowed to perform aircraft operations, primarily due to EAS Airlines' lax aircraft operating practices.

== See also ==
- Viasa Flight 742, another crash in which a small twinjet aircraft (a McDonnell Douglas DC-9) crashed into a crowded city area shortly after takeoff, causing a high number of ground fatalities.
