= Usman Albishir =

Nigerian politician

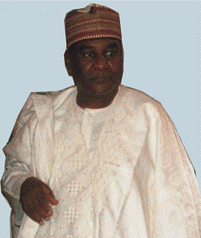

Senator of the Federal Republic of Nigeria from Yobe State North District
- In office 29 May 1999 – 5 June 2007
- Preceded by: Umar El-Gash Maina (1993)
- Succeeded by: Ahmed Ibrahim Lawan

Personal details
- Born: 15 June 1945 Nguru, Yobe State, Nigeria
- Died: 2 July 2012 (aged 67)
- Party: People's Democratic Party (PDP)

Shehu Usman Albishir (15 June 1945 – 2 July 2012) was a Nigerian senator representing Yobe North constituency of Yobe State. He was a member of the business family of Alhaji Albishir Abdullahi and Late Hajiya Fatima Albishir.

== Education ==
He attended the following schools: Nguru Central Primary School (1953–1954), Islamic Quaranic School(1954–1956), Hausari Primary School, Maiduguri (1956–1959), Nguru Senior Primary School, Nguru (1959 – 1960), Provincial Secondary School, Maiduguri (Now Government College 1964 – 1968). He obtained the following Certificates: First Primary School Leaving Certificate (1960), University of London General Certificate of Education (GCE 1966), West African School Certificate (1968).

== Business ==
After a successful completion of basic education, he joined his family business activities. He was mentored and instructed entrepreneurial skills that culminated in the formation of chains of diversified business activities ranging from manufacturing, shipping, airline, construction and merchandising.

== Politics ==
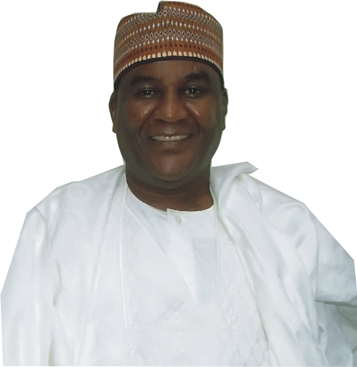
Usman Albishir

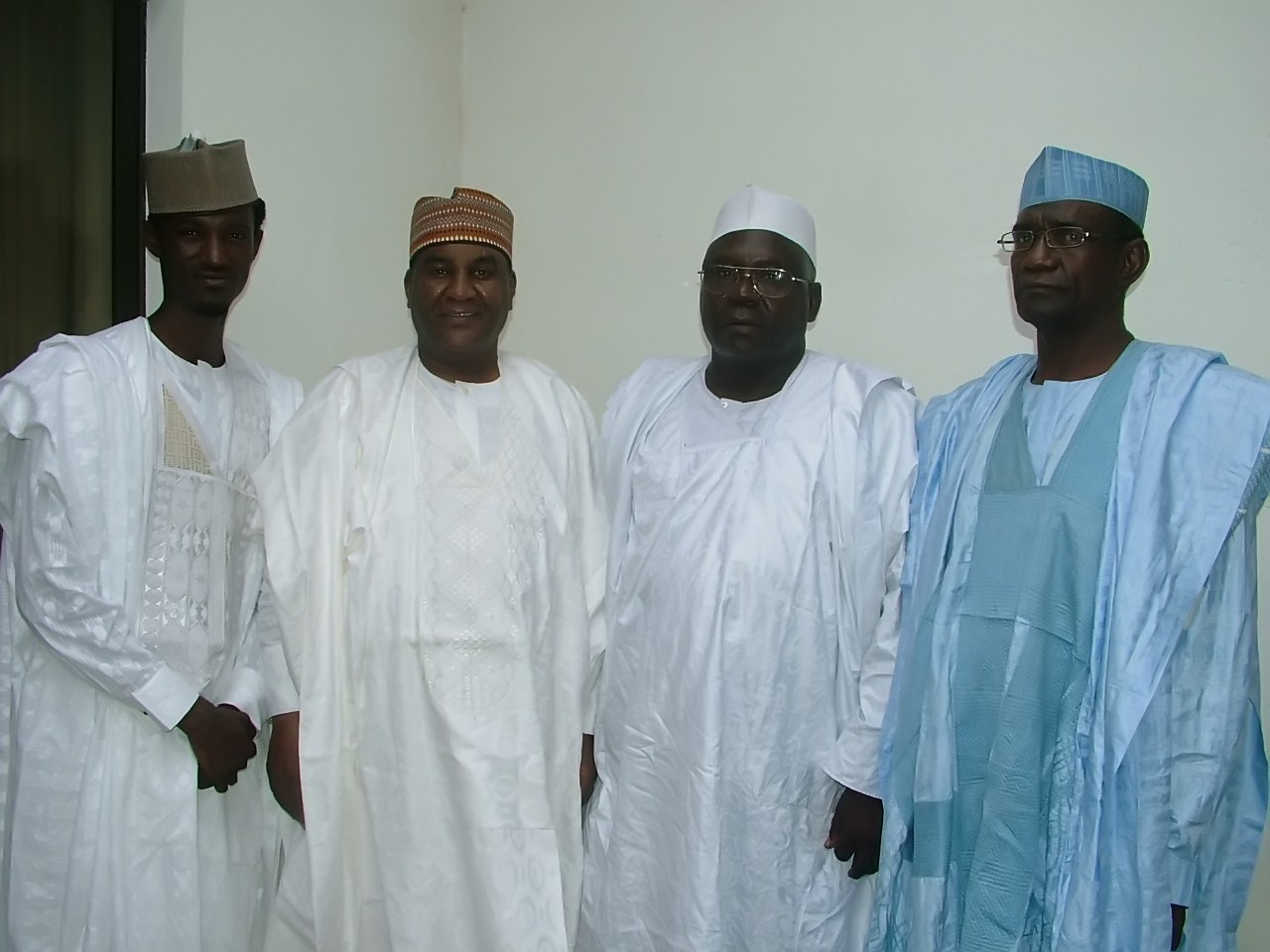
Left to Right: Mahmoud Bukar Maina, Late Senator Usman Albishir, Alh Yusuf Yunusa Mai hajja, and Alh Bukar Maina Nguru in 2010

His political career started in 1998, during the transitional programme of late General Sani Abacha, where he contested and won with landslide, senatorial election into the then National Assembly on the platform of United Nigeria Congress Party (UNCP). At the start of Fourth Republic in 1999, he contested and won the senatorial election on the platform of All Peoples' Party (APP). While in the senate, in recognition of his administrative and managerial acumen, he was elected APP Senate Leader, a position he occupied from June 1999 to April 2003. He resigned this appointment voluntarily.

In June 1999, Albishir was appointed to committees on Selection, Banking & Currency, Defense, Transport and Privatization.

He re-contested and won the Yobe North Senatorial District election in April 2003, on the All Nigeria Peoples Party (ANPP) platform.

After reelection in 2003, he was appointed Senate Minority Leader, but resigned the position under pressure in December 2004.

Albishir was a contender to be ANPP candidate for the 2007 Yobe State governorship race, supported by the incumbent Governor Bukar Abba Ibrahim, and won 382 votes against Senator Mamman Bello Ali's 88 votes in the primary election.

However, due to legal issues the party named Bello Ali as candidate and he was elected.

Albishir appealed this decision, and the case dragged through the courts until in February 2010, when the Supreme Court finally dismissed his last appeal.

Albishir later transferred to the Peoples Democratic Party (PDP) in hopes of winning the 2011 governorship election on that platform.

On 11 January 2011, at the PDP primaries held at the August 27th Stadium in Damaturu, Yobe State, Usman Albishir defeated former minister of Police Affairs Alhaji Adamu Maina Waziri and Mallam Garba Umar to clinch the party's governorship ticket for the general election in April 2011. Engineer Yakubu Bello withdrew from the race shortly before the commencement of the election while Hassan Saleh, erstwhile Secretary to Yobe State government, withdrew a few days later. Albishir scored 388 votes; Waziri got 226 while Garba Umar scored 46.

== Death ==
Usman Albishir died by car accident on July 2, 2012.
