= Fika Emirate =

Traditional state in Nigeria

Flag of Fika

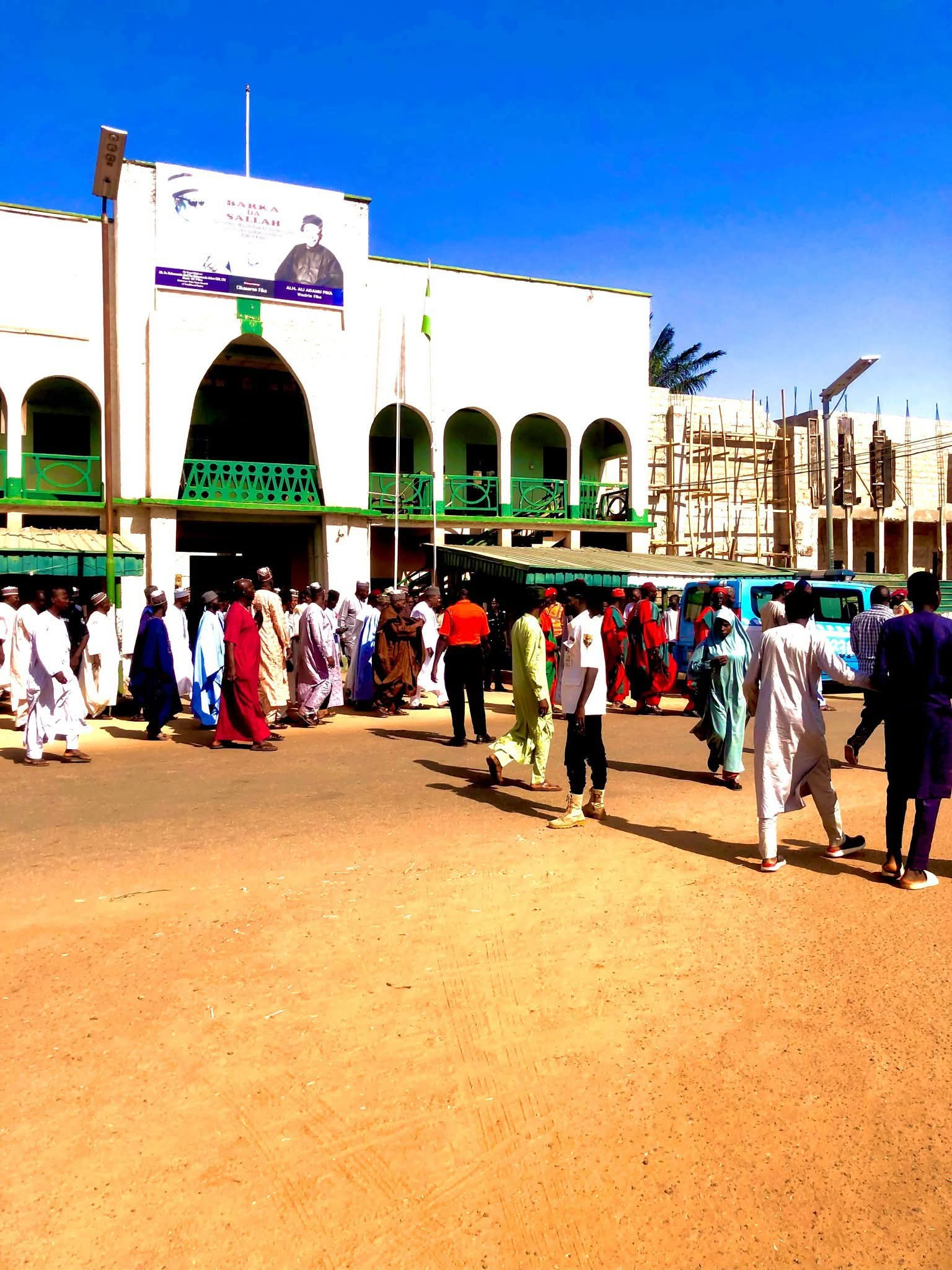
Fika Emirate

The Fika Emirate is a traditional state with headquarters in Potiskum, Yobe State, Nigeria. Dr. Muhammadu Abali Ibn Muhammadu Idrissa received his staff of office as 43rd Emir of Fika from Yobe governor Ibrahim Gaidam on 12 May 2010. The Emir (or Moi in the local language) is head of the Bole people.

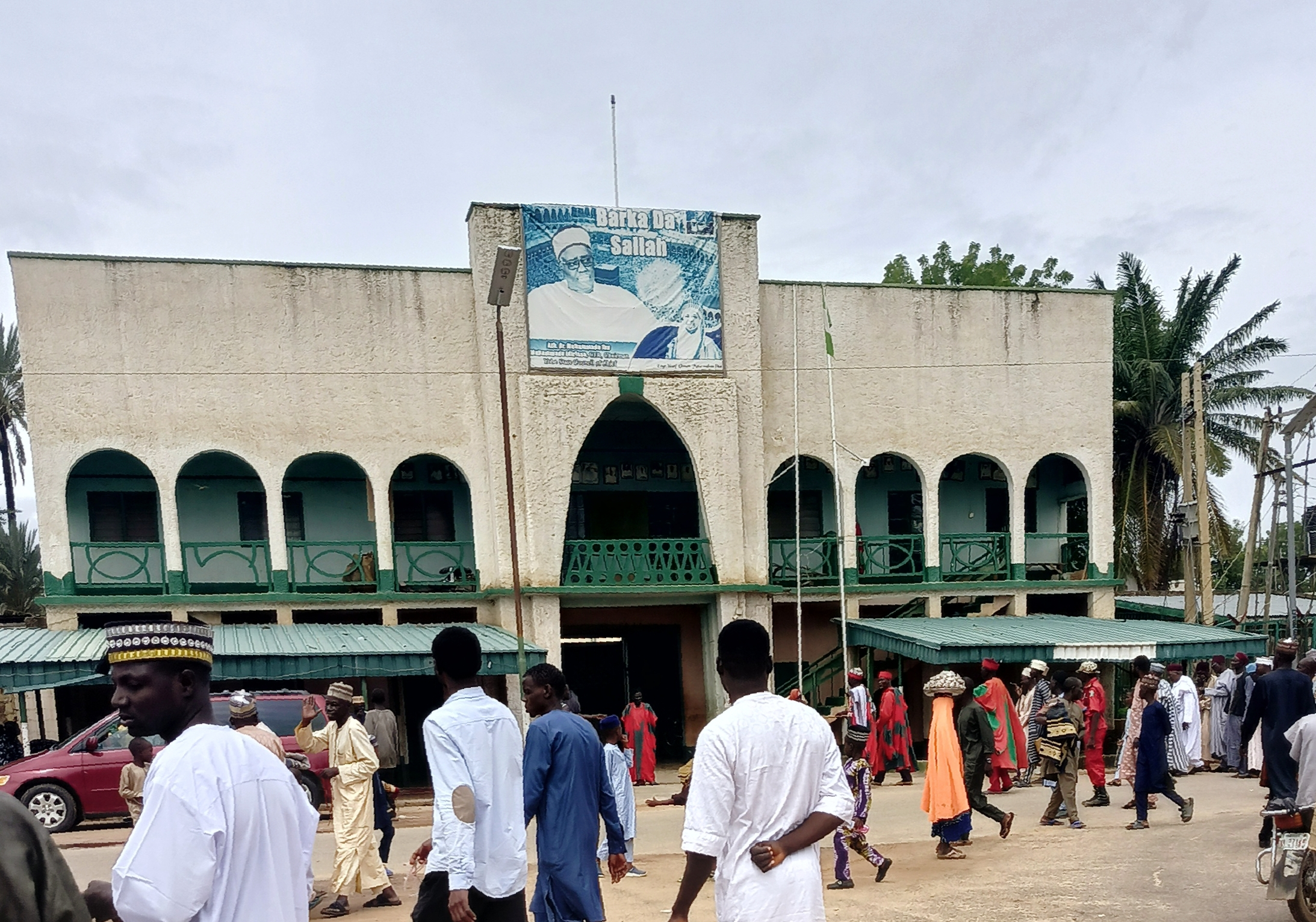
Fika Emirate Palace

The old Fika Emirate was a multi-ethnic emirate that according to tradition dates back to the 15th century. The Bole people, already converted to Islam, were said to have moved to the current location from a settlement named Daniski in 1805. The headquarters of the emirate was moved from Fika town to Potiskum in 1924. The current emir Muhammadu Idrissa succeeded Alhaji Abali Ibn Muhammadu Idrissa, who died at the age of 77 on 10 March 2009 leaving four wives and over 40 children.

On 6 January 2000 the governor of Yobe State, Bukar Abba Ibrahim, increased the number of Emirates in the state from four to thirteen. The Emir of Fika, Alhaji Muhammadu Abali, protested and brought court action, but eventually acquiesced. The emirate should not be confused with the Potiskum Emirate, created by Bukar Ibrahim as a "traditional state" for the Ngizim people. In 2009 and 2010 there was conflict between the emirate councils of Fika And Potiskum which came close to turning violent, but was resolved by the paramount Sultan of Sokoto, Sa'adu Abubakar.

== Rulers ==
Rulers of the Fike emirate:

Start	End	Ruler
1806	1822	Buraima
1822	1844	Adam
1844	1857	Disa Siri
1857	1867	Mammadi Gaganga
1867	1871	Isma`ila
1871	1882	Mammadi Buye
1882	1882	Aji
1882	1885	Mama (Muhammad)
1885	1902	Sule
1902	1922	Disa (Idris) (d. 1922)
1922	1976	Muhammadu Gana Ibn Idris (b. c.1881 – d. 1976)
Aug 1976	10 Mar 2009	Abali Muhammadu Ibn Idrissa (b. 1932/37 – d. 2009)
16 Mar 2009		Muhammadu Abali Ibn Muhammadu Idrissa (b. 1956)
