= 1992 Nigerian Senate elections in Bauchi State =

1992 Nigerian Senate election in Bauchi State

The 1992 Nigerian Senate election in Bauchi State was held on July 4, 1992, to elect members of the Nigerian Senate to represent Bauchi State. Ibrahim Lame representing Bauchi Central, Mohammed Uba Ahmed representing Bauchi East and Mohammed Bello Katagum representing Bauchi North all won on the platform of the National Republican Convention.

== Overview ==
Affiliation	Party		Total
Affiliation	SDP	NRC	Total
Before Election			3
After Election	0	3	3

== Summary ==
District	Incumbent	Party	Elected Senator	Party
Bauchi Central			Ibrahim Lame	NRC
Bauchi East			Mohammed Uba Ahmed	NRC
Bauchi North			Mohammed Bello Katagum	NRC

== Results ==
=== Bauchi Central ===
The election was won by Ibrahim Lame of the National Republican Convention.

1992 Nigerian Senate election in Bauchi State
Party	Candidate	Votes	%
NRC	Ibrahim Lame		
Total votes			
NRC hold			

=== Bauchi East ===
The election was won by Mohammed Uba Ahmed of the National Republican Convention.

1992 Nigerian Senate election in Bauchi State
Party	Candidate	Votes	%
NRC	Mohammed Uba Ahmed		
Total votes			
NRC hold			

=== Bauchi North ===
The election was won by Mohammed Bello Katagum of the National Republican Convention.

1992 Nigerian Senate election in Bauchi State
Party	Candidate	Votes	%
NRC	Mohammed Bello Katagum		
Total votes			
NRC hold			
