= 1992 Nigerian Senate elections in Benue State =

1992 Nigerian Senate election in Benue State

The 1992 Nigerian Senate election in Benue State was held on July 4, 1992, to elect members of the Nigerian Senate to represent Benue State. Iyorchia Ayu representing Benue North-West, Ameh Ebute representing Benue South and David Iornem representing Benue North-East all won on the platform of the Social Democratic Party.

== Overview ==
Affiliation	Party		Total
Affiliation	SDP	NRC	Total
Before Election			3
After Election	3	0	3

== Summary ==
District	Incumbent	Party	Elected Senator	Party
Benue North-West			Iyorchia Ayu	SDP
Benue South			Ameh Ebute	SDP
Benue North-East			David Iornem	SDP

== Results ==
=== Benue North-West ===
The election was won by Iyorchia Ayu of the Social Democratic Party.

1992 Nigerian Senate election in Benue State
Party	Candidate	Votes	%
SDP	Iyorchia Ayu		
Total votes			
SDP hold			

=== Benue South ===
The election was won by Ameh Ebute of the Social Democratic Party.

1992 Nigerian Senate election in Benue State
Party	Candidate	Votes	%
SDP	Ameh Ebute		
Total votes			
SDP hold			

=== Benue North-East ===
The election was won by David Iornem of the Social Democratic Party.

1992 Nigerian Senate election in Benue State
Party	Candidate	Votes	%
SDP	David Iornem		
Total votes			
SDP hold			
