= Aliyu Saleh Bagare =

Nigerian politician

His Excellency Aliyu Saleh Bagare

Deputy Governor of Yobe State
- In office 29 May 1999 – 29 May 2007
- Governor: Bukar Ibrahim
- Succeeded by: Ibrahim Gaidam

Personal details
- Born: Aliyu Saleh Bagare Bagare
- Party: All Nigeria Peoples Party (ANPP)

Aliyu Saleh Bagare is a Nigerian politician, who has served as a deputy governor of Yobe State since 9 January 1999. Bagare was elected alongside Bukar Abba Ibrahim who served as the governor in the 1999 Yobe State gubernatorial election. He holds the traditional chieftaincy title of Turakin Tikau of the Tikau Emirate Council.
