= Oluyemi Adeniji =

Federal Minister of Nigeria

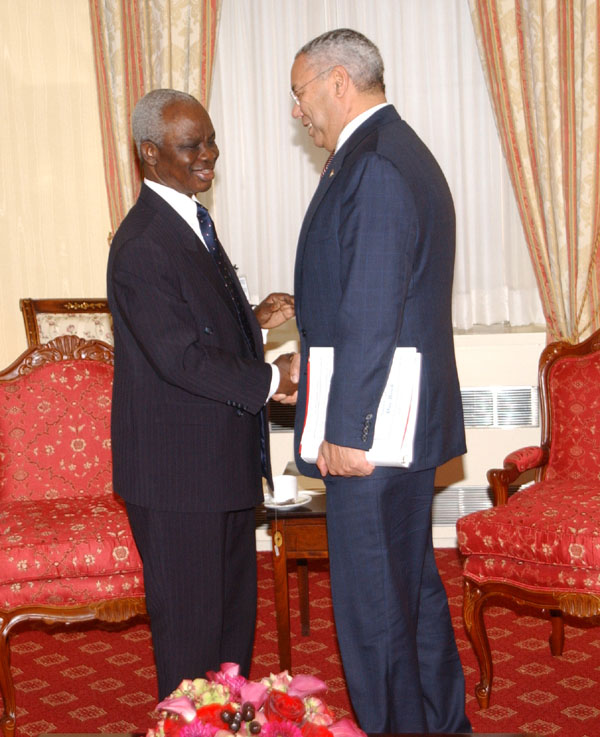
- Colin Powell with Oluyemi Adeniji in September 2003

Federal Minister of Foreign Affairs
- In office July 2003 – June 2006
- Preceded by: Sule Lamido
- Succeeded by: Ngozi Okonjo-Iweala

Federal Minister of Internal Affairs
- In office 21 June 2006 – May 2007
- Preceded by: Magaji Muhammed
- Succeeded by: Godwin Abbe

Personal details
- Born: 22 July 1934 Ijebu Ode, Ogun State, Nigeria
- Died: 27 November 2017 (aged 83) London, England

Ambassador Oluyemi Adeniji (22 July 1934 – 27 November 2017 in London) was a Nigerian career diplomat and politician who was the Special Representative of the General Secretary with the United Nations Mission in Sierra Leone (UNAMSIL) from November 19, 1999 to July 16, 2003. Later he was Foreign Minister of Nigeria from July 2003 to June 2006, then Internal Affairs Minister from 21 June 2006 to May 2007.

== Diplomatic career ==
Adeniji had a degree in History. He joined the Nigerian Foreign Service in July 1960. He served in the Ministry of Foreign Affairs and Nigerian embassies in Washington, D.C., Freetown, Sierra Leone, and Accra, Ghana. He retired from service in 1991 after serving as the Director-General of the ministry of foreign affairs. For five years he was the Nigerian Ambassador to France.

Adeniji was the United Nations Secretary-General's Special Representative for the United Nations Mission in the Central African Republic (MINURCA). The mission was responsible for providing security in Bangui and for coordinating the legislative and presidential elections held in 1998 and 1999.

He was then appointed the United Nations Secretary General's Special Representative for Sierra Leone and Head of the United Nations Mission in Sierra Leone (UNAMSIL).

== Later career ==
Adeniji was appointed Minister of Foreign Affairs in July 2003.

Beginning in early March 2008, Adeniji headed negotiations in Kenya related to that country's political crisis, following the departure of the previous head negotiator, Kofi Annan. In addition, he served on the Commission of Eminent Persons on The Role of the IAEA to 2020 and Beyond, chaired by Ernesto Zedillo, whose report Reinforcing the Global Nuclear Order for Peace and Prosperity was launched in June 2008.

Adeniji died on 27 November 2017 in London, aged 83.
