= Damishi Sango =

Nigerian politician

Damishi Tonson Sango

Minister of Sports
- In office June 1999 – January 2001
- Preceded by: Air Commodore Samson Emeka Omeruah
- Succeeded by: Ishaya Mark Aku

Personal details
- Born: 1 January 1950 (age 76) Riyom LGA, Plateau State, Nigeria

Hon Damishi Tonson Sango (born 1 January 1950) was appointed Nigerian Minister of Sports in the first cabinet of President Olusegun Obasanjo, holding office between June 1999 and January 2001. He was a challenger to become the People's Democratic Party (PDP) governorship candidate for Plateau State in 1999 and 2007, and ran for Plateau State governor on the Alliance for Democracy (AD) platform in 2003.

== Early life and career ==
Damishi Sango was born on 1 January 1950 in Ganawuri, in Riyom Local Government Area of Plateau State and belongs to the Aten minority ethnic group. He obtained a grade II teacher's certificate in 1973 and began working as an elementary school teacher, later becoming headmaster. Attending the University of Jos, he earned a BSc in history in 1982 and a Masters in Comparative Politics in 1986. He was appointed to the boards of Jos International Breweries and the Christian Pilgrim's Welfare Board.

In 1987 Sango was elected Chairman of the Barakin Ladi Local Government Area in Plateau State. In 1993 he became Plateau State's presidential nominee for the Social Democratic Party under the option A4 system. However he failed to become a candidate in the national elections, which were anyway annulled by the military administration. After the return to democracy with the Nigerian Fourth Republic, Sango was one of the three main aspirants to be PDP candidate for governor of Plateau State, the other two being David Jang and Joshua Dariye. He was thought to have come second in the PDP primaries after Jang, with Dariye third. However, the National headquarters selected Dariye as PDP candidate, and he went on to be elected governor.

== Sports Minister ==
Sango was sworn in as Sports Minister in June 1999 in President Olusegun Obasanjo's first cabinet. He later confessed that he knew nothing about sports when assigned the job. During his period of office, Nigeria competed in the All African Games in South Africa (September 1999) and the Olympic Games in Australia (September 2000), and the national football team the Super Eagles played in several international competitions. In January 2001 president Obasanjo dropped Sango from his cabinet. In December 2009, Sango criticized the practice of constantly replacing sports ministers after a year or so in office. He recommended that they should have a 10-year tenure, so they could have time to make real improvements, and could be held accountable for results.

=== Challenges ===
There was no funding for the All African Games, which started three months after Sango took office. The Ministry of Sports said that failure to provide sufficient funding on time was their main problem in preparing for the Olympics. In addition, Sango had to contend with rebellious Sports Association chairmen. In November 2002, after leaving office, Sango said there was a "mafia" in the ministry of sports that would frustrate any minister's policy or program. He made similar criticisms of the Nigeria Football Association, which were echoed by Senator Olorunnimbe Mamora in 2008 when he accused the "mafia" of stifling the growth of Nigerian sports.

=== 2000 Olympics ===
Sango was booed by the crowd in July 2000 when he attended an Athletics Championship before the Sydney Olympics, due to the poor state of preparation for the Olympics. However, funding for the Olympics had only been approved in June 2000, less than three months before the event. Sanjo was forced to rely on Cuban coaches to train Nigeria's boxing team, an offer that Cuba had made following a recent visit President Olesanjo's had made to that country. The star Nigerian football striker Nwankwo Kanu was unable to obtain a release from the Arsenal football club to play in the games.

In the 2000 games, Nigeria earned three silver medals. After the games, Sango awarded $6,000 to 4 × 400 m men's relay silver-medalist Aniefiok Udo-Obong and to his teammates for their performance. In November 2000, Sango faced a panel probing the poor performance of the Nigerian contingent at the Olympic games, testifying at a six-hour closed hearing.

=== Football ===
In January 2000, Sango flew to Malaga, Spain to visit the Super Eagles camp and check the progress of their training for the 2000 Africa Cup of Nations co-hosted by Ghana and Nigeria. This followed two serious defeats in friendly matches in Spain. In June 2000, Sango attempted to resolve a disagreement between the Nigeria Football Association (NFA) and Minaj Broadcast International related to the marketing of national league matches.

Sango faced criticism over employment of Dutch football coach Johannes Bonfrere, but in June 2000 supported him on a TV sports show, citing Bonfrere's in-depth technical knowledge of the game. He defended Bonfrere again in October 2000 after Nigeria's poor performance at the Olympics, saying that he did his best. In January 2001 he said he was unable to sack Bonfrere since he had not had any official complaint from the NFA concerning breach of contract. Sango's successor Ishaya Mark Aku later criticized Bonfrere's contract, which he considered overpaid and insufficiently specific about duties.

=== Miscellaneous ===
Sango was tough on doping, and directed the Olympic sports chairmen to monitor their athletes to avoid any embarrassment over the use of banned drugs. In November 2000, Sango challenged National Sports Association chairmen to use the 12th National Sports Festival in Bauchi as a way of discovering budding athletes to represent Nigeria internationally in the future. In December 2000 he said he would cleanse the organizations of the 24 sports associations, other than the Nigeria Football Association, to solve their endemic problems of unqualified chairmen, excessive financial demands and poor results. He praised establishment of grassroots soccer outfits in rural areas, describing them as a move in the right direction and calling on individuals and corporate bodies to give support.

== Later career ==
After leaving the Ministry of Sports and Social Development, Sango held various government appointments. In October 2006 as Chairman of the Nigerian Copyright Commission he presided over destruction of N390 million worth of copyright violating materials at the Lagos State Waste Disposal ground, including VCDs, audio CDs and books. In August 2009 President Umaru Musa Yar'Adua appointed him a member of the board of the Integrated Water Resources Management Agency. But the focus of his career was the ongoing political struggle between leading Plateau State politicians including himself, Joshua Dariye, elected Plateau State governor in April 1999 and reelected in 2003, who held office until impeached in November 2006, Jonah Jang, who was elected Plateau State governor in April 2007, Solomon Lar and Fidelis Tapgun, earlier governors of the state and Senator Ibrahim Mantu.

=== 2003 campaign ===
In October 2001 it was reported that Sango and retired Air Commodore Jonah Jang had reached an agreement to cooperate in removing the current party leadership in Plateau State, dominated by Governor Dariye, before competing independently for the post of governor. In March 2002 Sango described Dariye's recent creation of new districts and Chiefdoms as cosmetic, doing nothing to solve the urgent need to improve road and hospitals, power, water and schools. Dariye announced the formation of a group called the Plateau Elders Unity Forum, saying Jang and Sango were among the members, but they were not consulted before their names were announced. Jang later left the PDP to become the gubernatorial candidate of the All Nigeria People's Party (ANPP).

In May 2002 Sango also left the PDP. In August 2002 he was formally accepted as a member of the Alliance for Democracy (AD) party. As AD candidate for governor, Sanjo appealed to the people of Plateau State to fully participate in the voter registration exercise so they could achieve genuine change. At a massive political rally in Jos Sango told the crowd that he was just a symbol of the aspirations of ordinary men and women in the state, and described local leaders as the real moving spirit of the party. In March 2003 he said "the need to restore our state, reconstruct and build the ruins of what has become the lot of our dear state in the last four years, is the embodiment of our struggle". Just before the April 2003 elections there were rumors that the ANPP and AD had agreed that Sango would step out of the race and transfer his support to Jonah Jang. Sango denied this. Joshua Dariye was again elected on the PDP platform. Subsequently, the AD broke up in rival factions.

=== PDP infighting ===
Sango rejoined the PDP, and was one of the main challengers to Jonah Jang in the 2007 Plateau State PDP governorship primaries. He was supported in his bid by Senator Ibrahim Mantu, who had been assisted in gaining his seat by Dariye but had later worked for Dariye's impeachment. Sango was unsuccessful, with Jang winning the primaries and going on to be elected governor. In the primaries, none of the aspirants obtained 50% of the vote as required to be declared winner, although Jonah Jang gained the most votes. In the interest of party unity, Sango agreed to accept Jang as candidate rather than insist on a rerun.

After the 2007 elections there were speculations that governor Jonah Jang had removed Sango's name from the list of ministerial nominees for the state. Sango became part of a PDP faction in Plateau State that was opposed to Jonah Jang. In April 2009 the factional struggle boiled up at the national PDP convention in Abuja, with policemen removing Mr Emmanuel Imagnih, chairman of Sango's faction, from the meeting. Sango was invited to talk with President Umaru Yar'Adua, but denied that the discussion had anything to do with the incident. In a newspaper interview that month, Sango said that there was no problem, and the party was united.

In June 2009 former governor Joshua Dariye joined the anti-Jang faction. The two sides were invited to meet with the PDP's National Working Committee to resolve their differences in July 2009, but Jang declined to attend. In a September 2009 interview one of the faction members, Jimmy Cheto, stated that Jang had deliberately excluded senior members of the party including Tapgun, Dariye, Sango and Mantu. Sango went further, alleging that Jang and his PDP followers had begun discussions with opposition parties to form an alternative platform in the 2011 elections.

=== 2011 campaign ===
In April 2010 former student union leader Comrade Ashu Yakubu launched a text message campaign to make Sango a candidate in the 2011 elections. In May 2010 a group calling itself the "2011 Movement in Plateau" called for the party to make Sango its candidate, citing his selfless action in allowing Jang to become candidate in 2007 despite not having enough votes. An analysis of Sango as a possible candidate noted that he had the advantage of coming from the north of the state, with no senior contenders from that zone. He could be handicapped by coming from an ethnic minority, but had the advantage of being broadly acceptable to religious groups. An article in the Tribune paid Sango a backhanded compliment, saying he possibly lacked the necessary financial resources to run for election due to having invested much over the years in politics with little return.
