= Musa Mustapha (politician) =

Nigerian politician

Mustapha Musa Kulas
- Preceded by: Ibrahim Geidam

Senator for Yobe East

Personal details
- Born: 15 August 1975 (age 51) Damaturu, North-Eastern State (now Yobe State), Nigeria
- Party: All Progressives Congress (APC)
- Occupation: Politician
- Profession: Senator

Musa Mustapha (Kulas) (born 15 August 1975) is a Nigerian politician and a current senator of Yobe East senatorial district in Yobe State.
