= David Jemibewon =

Nigerian politician

Major General David Jemibewon

Minister of Police Affairs
- In office 1999–2000
- Succeeded by: Stephen Akiga

Military Governor of Oyo State
- In office March 1976 – July 1978
- Succeeded by: Col. Paul Tarfa

Military Governor of Western State
- In office August 1975 – March 1976

Personal details
- Born: 20 July 1940 (age 86)
- Education: NMTC; Mons Officer Cadet School; University of Lagos; Ahmadu Bello University; United States Army Command and General Staff College

Military service
- Allegiance: Nigeria
- Branch/service: Nigerian Army
- Years of service: 1960–1983
- Rank: Major General

David Medayese Jemibewon (born 20 July 1940) is a retired Nigerian Army major general who served as military governor of the now defunct Western State (August 1975 – March 1976) during the military regime of General Murtala Muhammed, governor of Oyo State after it had been created from part of the old Western State (March 1976 -July 1978) during the military regime of General Olusegun Obasanjo, and later as Minister of Police Affairs in the cabinet of President Olusegun Obasanjo after the return to democracy (1999 to 2000). He was a contender for the Kogi West Senatorial District in Kogi State.

== Early life and education ==
Jemibewon was born on 20 July 1940 in Iyah-Gbedde in Ijumu council of Kogi State. He was educated in Nigeria, England, and the United States of America. He holds the traditional title of Jagunmolu of Ibadan, Oyo State. He belongs to the Okun majority ethnic group.

== Military career ==
Jemibewon was General Officer Commanding First Infantry Division. In August 1975 he was appointed governor of Western State replacing Akintunde Aduwo, who had held office for just 30 days. In March 1976 Western State was divided into Ogun, Ondo and Oyo. Jemibewon continued as governor of Oyo State. Later he became Adjutant General of the Nigerian Army.

== Post-army career ==
After retiring from the army Jemibewon earned a degree in law at the University of Lagos. He then opened a successful legal practice. He was also involved in palm oil trading. When Obasanjo was charged and convicted for alleged complicity in a coup plot in 1995, Jemibewon and General Theophilus Yakubu Danjuma successfully interceded on his behalf with the military head of state General Sani Abacha.

Jemibewon was chairman of the constitution drafting committee of the People's Democratic Party (PDP) in 1998 during preparations for the 1998/1999 democratic elections that ushered in the Nigerian Fourth Republic. Appointed Minister for Police Affairs in Obasanjo's first cabinet in June 1999, he introduced a five-year plan for the recovery of the police, adding 33,000 police officers, setting up the Nigeria Police Service Commission, and better equipping the police to cope with the task of internal security. Speaking on behalf of Obasanjo at the 9th International Anti-Corruption Conference in South Africa, in December 1999, David Jemibewon told the conference that "To sustain democracy, we have to keep itching fingers and greedy eyes off the public till. Those in power must be accountable to the people."

In the run up to the April 2003 Senatorial elections for Kogi West, he was the main competitor to the incumbent Tunde Ogbeha for the PDP candidature. He was unsuccessful in the bid, and Ogbeha went on to be elected for a second term. However, he remained a member of both the PDP and the PDP Board of Trustees.

In August 2003 Jemibewon was listed as a director of EBS Nigeria, a relatively unknown company before June 2006 when it emerged as a big player in a N2.5 billion contract for supply of anti-retroviral drugs from the Federal Ministry of Health.

He is the proprietor of Jemibewon International Academy, a co-educational boarding school located at Km 20 on the Kabba-Ilorin highway, which was formally opened and dedicated on 20 July 2012 by the Catholic Bishop of Lokoja Diocese, Most Rev. Dr Martin Olorunmolu.

- David M. Jemibewon (1978). A combatant in government. Heinemann Educational Books (Nigeria).
- David M. Jemibewon (1989). An introduction to the theory and practice of military law in Nigeria. Friends Foundation Publishers. ISBN 978-2703-74-5.
- David M. Jemibewon (1998). The military, law and society: reflections of a general. Spectrum Books Ltd. ISBN 978-029-001-X.
- David M. Jemibewon (2001). The Nigeria police in transition: issues, problems and prospects. Spectrum Books. ISBN 978-029-307-8.
