= Ganawuri =

- Chiefdom and Town
- Location within Nigeria
- Coordinates: 09°41′N 08°42′E
- Country: Nigeria
- State: Plateau State
- LGA: Riyom

Government
  - Type: Elective monarchy
  - Atar Aten: HRH Yakubu Chaimang
- Time zone: UTC+01:00 (WAT)
- Postal code: 931
- Climate: Aw

Ganawuri is a town in Riyom Local Government Area of Plateau State in the Middle Belt region of Nigeria. The postal code for the area is 931.

== People and language ==
The indigenous people of the town are the Niten people who speak Iten, a Beromic language.

== Notable people ==
- Damishi Sango
- Gabriel Gala

== See also ==
- List of villages in Plateau State
