= Sani Daura Ahmed =

Governor of Yobe State, Nigeria

Governor of Yobe State
- In office 27 August 1991 – 2 January 1992
- Succeeded by: Bukar Abba Ibrahim

Sani Daura-Ahmed Assistant Inspector General (AIG) was the first Governor of Yobe State, Nigeria after it was split out from Borno State on 27 August 1991, holding office until January 1992 during the military regime of General Ibrahim Babangida. He handed over to the elected governor Bukar Abba Ibrahim at the start of the Nigerian Third Republic.

As Lagos State commissioner of police, speaking of a newspaper report on an incident in 1991 where two students had been killed in a clash with police, Daura said, "We are not going to let the press disturb us on what we are doing."

In October 2000, a businessman took Daura to court for alleged threats and intimidation. In May 2002, the court ordered Daura to release the businessman's detained Mercedes-Benz car. In 2003 he was a member of the Police Service Commission. He was later appointed to the Katsina State consultant committee on employment generation.
