= John Ben Kalio =

Nigerian politician

John Ibiwari Ben Kalio

Governor of Yobe State
- In office 14 August 1996 – 14 August 1998
- Preceded by: Dabo Aliyu
- Succeeded by: Musa Mohammed

Group Captain (retired) John Ibiwari Ben Kalio was Administrator of Yobe State from August 1996 to August 1998 during the military regime of General Sani Abacha. In October 1997, Yobe State Television aired a 45-minute documentary on the achievements of his predecessor, Police Commander Dabo Aliyu. According to Media Rights Agenda, Kalio ordered the arrest of the eight workers on duty at the station, which was shut down, and had them taken to his office where they were disciplined. Also as a military Governor, he invested in mechanized agriculture, he increased access to education and healthcare at the rural level, invested in social housing across the state which helped reduced the housing deficit in the newly created state and pursued numerous social programs for the poor.
