= Ishaya Mark Aku =

Nigerian politician

Minister of Sports
- In office February 2001 – May 2002
- Preceded by: Sango Damishi
- Succeeded by: Stephen Akiga

Personal details
- Died: 4 May 2002

Ishaya Mark Aku (died 4 May 2002) was a Nigerian Minister of Sports in the first cabinet of President Olusegun Obasanjo. He died in a plane crash in Northern Nigeria.

== Background ==
Aku was born in Bassa local government area of Plateau State to the late paramount ruler of the Rukuba chiefdom and qualified as a water engineer. He entered the Plateau State civil service, where he held various positions, and was a permanent secretary when appointed Sports Minister. His predecessor as Sports Minister, Damishi Sango, was his kinsman.

== Sports Minister ==
Aku was appointed Sports Minister in February 2001. He reorganized the Nigeria Football Association (NFA) to become a semi-independent body that relied less on government funding. He disbanded the Super Eagles, the National team, after they performed poorly at the 2002 African Cup of Nations in Mali. He was appointed head of the Supreme Council of Sports in Africa. Working with Chief Patrick Ekeji of the Sports Ministry, Aku started to reduce the emphasis on football to encourage other sports.

== Death ==
On 4 May 2002, Aku was among 69 passengers on board an airliner that crashed minutes after take-off in Kano. The plane went into a nose dive shortly after take-off and plowed into built-up area, killing many people on the ground. Total dead were over 148. Aku was on his way from Jos to Lagos to watch a friendly match between the Nigerian and Kenyan national teams.
