= Muhammadu Abali Ibn Muhammadu Idrissa =

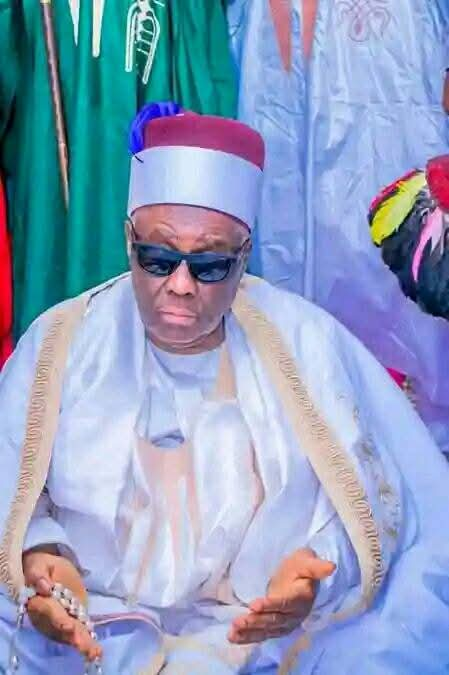

Emir of Fika
- Incumbent
- Assumed office 16 March 2009
- Preceded by: Abali Ibn Muhammadu

Personal details
- Born: 14 August 1956 (age 69) Potiskum, Yobe State, Nigeria

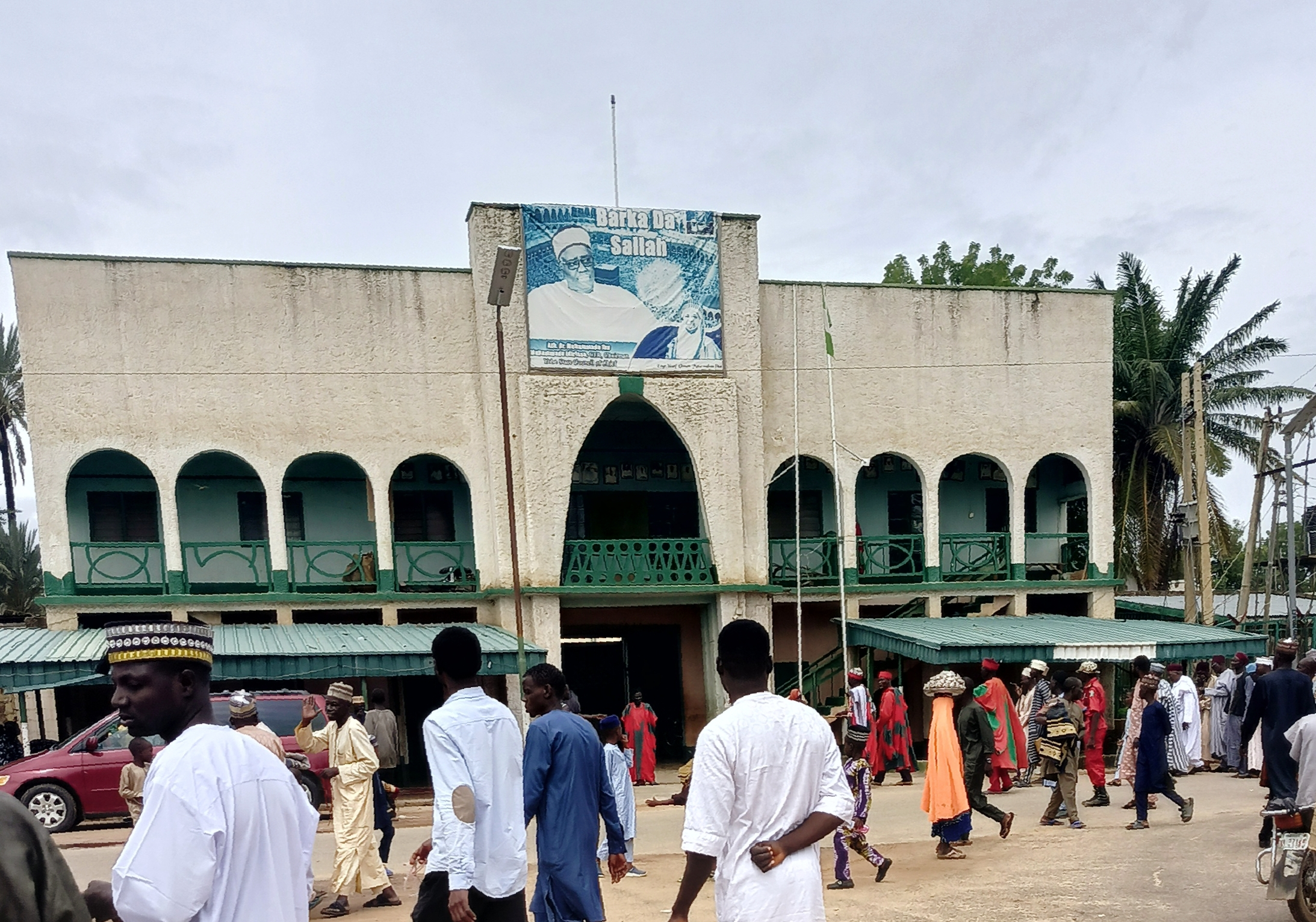
Fika Emirate

Alhaji Muhammadu Abali Ibn Muhammadu Idrissa (born 14 August 1956) was appointed 13th Emir, or traditional ruler, of the Fika Emirate on 16 March 2009. The emir's palace is in Potiskum, Yobe State, Nigeria. The Emir (or Moi in the local language) is head of the Bole people.

== Early years ==
Muhammad Abali was born in Potiskum on 14 August 1956, the eldest son of Alhaji Abali Ibn Muhammadu, the 12th Emir. He attended Kaduna Capital School (1963–1969), Barewa College, Zaria (1970–1974) and Land Dowel Tutors College in the United Kingdom (1975–1977). He went on to North Staffordshire Polytechnic (1977–1980) earning a bachelor's degree in Modern Studies. He then attended the City University London, gaining a master's degree from the Department of Sociology in 1983.

Returning to Nigeria, Muhammad Abali worked for a short period at the Owena Bank, Kano as a graduate trainee. He then joined the Nigerian Security Organization, serving in various departments including the Operations and Counter Espionage Units, and rising to the position of Senior Security/Intelligence Officer at the National Headquarters in Lagos. Resigning from the State Security Service in June 1991, he founded a firm that supplies security-related equipment and services.

He was Chief Security Officer of the Nigerian Railway Corporation from December 1998 to June 2007, and then Security Coordinator for Total/Elf at the Abuja Office.

== Emir ==
Muhammad Abali was given the title of Yeriman Fika in 2002, and on 28 February 2009 was turbaned as the District Head of Potiskum.

Muhammad Abali became emir in succession to his father in March 2009 after the Governor of Yobe State, Ibrahim Geidam, selected his name from a list of three candidates presented by the Fika Emirate kingmakers.

Although the 13th Emir since the current Emirate was founded in 1805 during the upheavals of the Fulani jihad, the Emir counts as 43rd Emir according to the traditions of his people, who trace the emirate back to the 15th century.

In April 2010 Yobe State Governor Ibrahim Gaidam presented a first class Staff of Office to Idrissa, who was also Chairman of the Yobe State Council of Chiefs. The ceremony was presided over by the Sultan of Sokoto, Alhaji Muhammadu Sa’ad Abubakar III. Notable attendees included governors Ali Modu Sheriff of Borno, Danjuma Goje of Gombe, Danbaba Suntai of Taraba and Murtala Nyako of Adamawa.

In July 2009 about 50 fanatics of the fundamentalist Boko Haram sect attacked police in Potiskum. Many women and children sought refuge in the Emir's palace. The Emir said the police were not in any way to blame for the violence. In November 2009, in his Sallah message to the people of Yobe State the Emir called on the heterogeneous community to live with one another peacefully and harmoniously.

After a major fire in Potiskum market destroyed about 210 shops and all their goods in March 2010, the Emir placed the blame on the Potiskum Local Council for failing to spend revenue from the market on improvements that would reduce the risk of fire. In December 2009, and again in June 2010 he said that traditional rulers should have a constitutional role, acting as advisors to the government over day to day issues. In an August 2010 interview he noted that the government often called on traditional rulers to resolve emergency issues such as the Boko Haram violence, and the constitution should therefore give them a more formal advisory position.

== Chancellor of UNIOYO ==
In April 2010 Idrissa was appointed the 3rd Chancellor of the University of Uyo in Akwa Ibom State. He succeeded his father, Alhaji Abali Muhammadu Idrissa, who was the 2nd Chancellor of the University. Speaking at his installation, during which he received an honorary degree of Doctor of Letters, the Emir responded to a statement by Acting President Goodluck Jonathan calling for efforts to improve university results. He said "the university must adopt a global perception if we must catch up with the Millennium Development Goals". He called on the Federal government to make education a national priority and to help the university achieve these ends.

== Awards ==
In October 2022, a Nigerian national honor of Commander Of The Order Of The Federal Republic (CFR) was conferred on him by President Muhammadu Buhari.
