= Musa Mohammed (politician) =

Nigerian politician and soldier

Governor of Yobe State
- In office August 1998 – May 1999
- Preceded by: John Ben Kalio
- Succeeded by: Bukar Abba Ibrahim

Minister of Sports and Social Development
- In office July 2003 – July 2005
- Preceded by: Stephen Akiga
- Succeeded by: Saidu Samaila Sambala

Minister of Youth Development
- In office July 2005 – June 2006
- Preceded by: Frank Nweke
- Succeeded by: S. A. Jakanda

Military service
- Allegiance: Nigeria
- Branch/service: Nigerian Army
- Rank: Colonel

Musa Mohammed is a Nigerian politician and Nigerian Army colonel who served as the Administrator of Yobe State, Nigeria from August 1998 to May 1999 during the transitional regime of General Abdulsalami Abubakar. Later he became the Minister of Sports and Social Development from July 2003 to July 2005 during the administration of President Olusegun Obasanjo.

== Career ==
=== Military ===
Musa Mohammed attended the Nigeria Defence Academy (NDA), Kaduna and the Ahmadu Bello University, Zaria. In his military career, he was an Instructor at the NDA, Brigade Major and Chief Instructor at the Nigerian Army Signal School and a General Staff Officer at Army Headquarters. Appointed administrator of Yobe State from August 1998 to May 1999, as a former military administrator he was required to retire from the army after the return to democracy.

=== Politics ===
In April 2001, he became a member of the steering committee of the United Nigeria Development Forum (UNDF), a group of former military governors. He was a contender to become the candidate of the People's Democratic Party (PDP) for Governor of Gombe State in the 2003 elections, but lost in the primaries to Mohammed Danjuma Goje, who went on to be elected Governor.

Musa Mohammed was appointed Minister of Sports and Social Development in July 2003. On 13 July 2005, in a Cabinet reshuffle he became Minister for Inter-governmental Affairs, Youth Development and Special Duties. In June 2006, he was disengaged from Obasanjo's cabinet in order for him to focus on seeking elective office in the April 2007 election.
