= Goni Modu Bura =

Nigerian politician

Goni Modu Zanna Bura

Senator for Yobe East
- Incumbent
- Assumed office 29 May 1999
- Succeeded by: Usman Adamu

Personal details
- Born: 6 January 1960 (age 66) Yobe State, Nigeria

Goni Modu Zanna Bura was elected Senator for the Yobe East constituency of Yobe State, Nigeria at the start of the Nigerian Fourth Republic, running on the People's Democratic Party (PDP) platform. He took office on 29 May 1999. After taking his seat in the Senate in June 1999 he was appointed to committees on Ethics, Environment, Health, State & Local Government and Government Affairs. He was a contender to be PDP candidate for Yobe State Governor in the 2003 elections.

Later he served as Deputy Governor of Yobe State and then was appointed Ambassador of Nigeria to Lebanon.
