= National Sports Commission =

The National Sports Commission is the Nigerian apex body responsible for regulating sports in the country, with Alhassan Yakmut serving as the last Director-General before it was scrapped by the Muhammadu Buhari government in 2015. It is headed by the Minister of Sports in Nigeria. Its origin dates as far back as 1910 with the creation of the Empire Day competition.

== Some notable moments ==
- The first time Nigeria participated in an international sporting event was in 1934 Common Wealth and Empire Day Games held in London.
- Nigeria first contingent participation was in 1950 Commonwealth Games, 1952 Olympics in Finland and 1965 All African Games in Brazzaville, Congo
- National Sports Council was established in 1962, as a parastatal under the Federal Ministry of Labour
- Became established as the National Sports Commission in 1971 (by the Federal Military Government Decree 34 of 1971)
- In 1975, Nigeria had her first Minister for Youth and Sports
- In 1995, the National Sport Commission was dissolved and replaced by the Ministry of Youth and Sports.
- In 2007, the Ministry for Sport and Social Development was again dissolved and then replaced with the National Sports Commission.

== Name changes ==
- National Sports Council (1962–1963)
- Ministry of Labour (1964 - 1971)
- National Sports Commission (1971- 1975)
- Ministry of Social Development, Youth and Sports (1975 - 1979)
- Ministry of Youth and Culture (1979 - 1982)
- Ministry of Youth, Sport and Culture (1982 - 1990)
- Ministry of Youth and Sports (1990 - 1992)
- National Sports Commission (1992 - 1995)
- Ministry of Youth and Sports (1995 - 1999)
- Ministry of Sports and Social Development (1999 - 2007)
- National Sports Commission (2007–Present)
