= Magaji Muhammed =

Nigerian politician

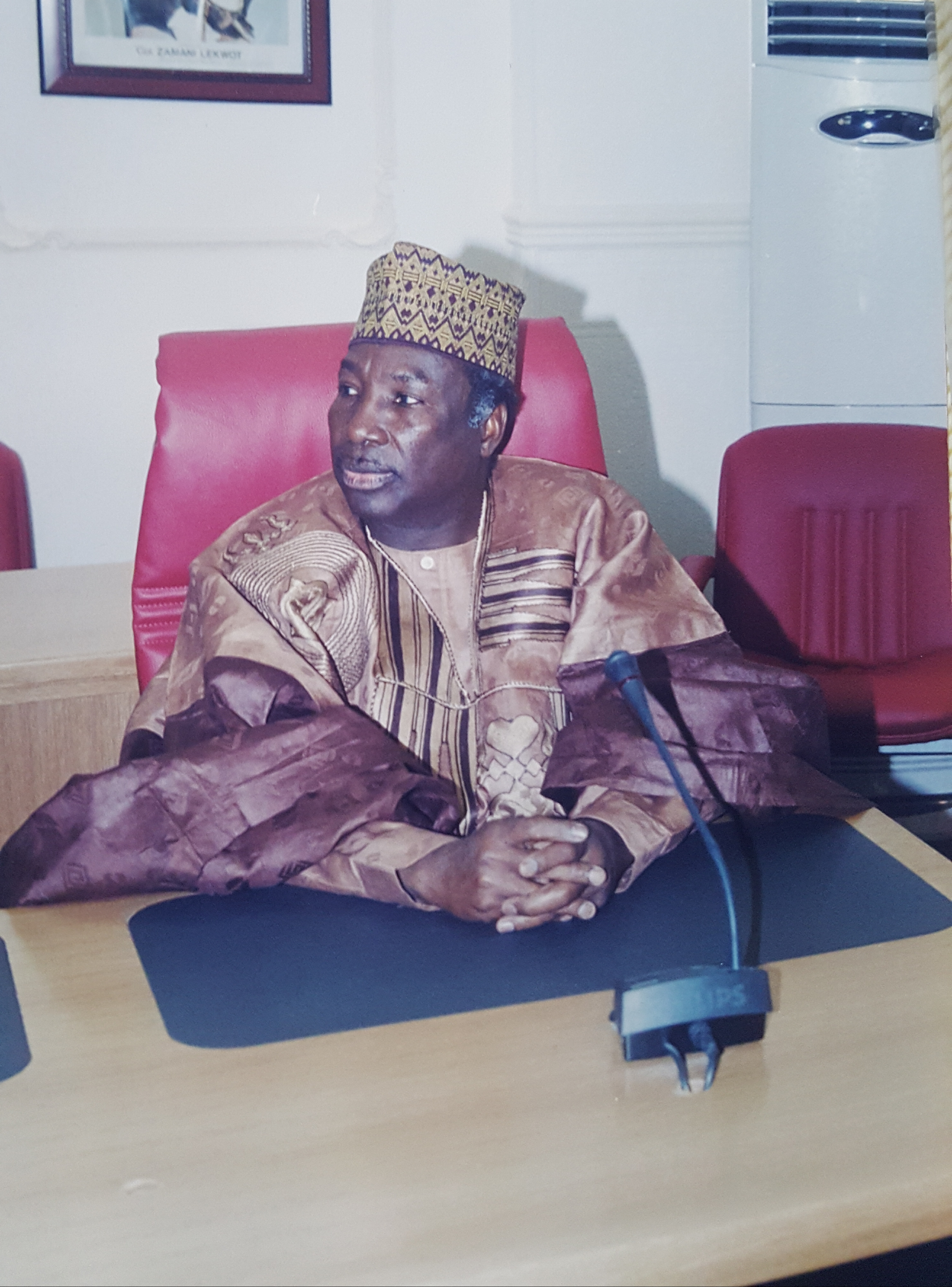

Federal Minister of Industry, Nigeria
- In office May 2003 – 13 July 2005
- Preceded by: Stephen Akiga
- Succeeded by: Fidelis Tapgun

Federal Minister of Internal Affairs
- In office 13 July 2005 – June 2006
- Preceded by: Iyorchia Ayu
- Succeeded by: Oluyemi Adeniji

Personal details
- Born: 31 December 1940 Dutsin-Ma, Katsina State, Nigeria
- Died: April 2017 (age 76)
- Party: People's Democratic Party (PDP)

Magaji Muhammed (31 December 1940 – April 2017) headed the Nigerian Federal Ministry of Internal Affairs until the June 2006, when he resigned to pursue a gubernatorial ambition, and he was succeeded by Oluyemi Adeniji. He is also a former Minister of Industries.

== Background ==
Magaji Muhammed was born on 31 December 1940 in Dutsin-Ma, Katsina State. He attended Ahmadu Bello University, Zaria as the Pioneer set of students of the university, where he earned a BA Degree in Administration. From 1965 to 1975, he was district Officer in-charge of Idoma, Wukari and Tiv Division of defunct Northern Nigeria, and Principal Assistant Secretary, Military Governor's Office, Kaduna. He also served as Administrator, Kaduna Capital Territory. In 1975, he was appointed Permanent Secretary. He joined the Federal Civil Service in 1980 and was Director, Project Implementation, Federal Ministry of Industries and Director, Commercial and Industrial Incentives, Federal Ministry of Trade and Industries.

== Obasanjo government ==
Muhammed was Nigeria's Ambassador, Extraordinary and Plenipotentiary, to the Kingdom of Saudi Arabia from 2000 to 2003. He was appointed Minister of Industry by President Olusegun Obasanjo in June 2003 and in 2005 he was appointed federal Minister of Internal affairs. Ambassador Magaji was superb and excellent as minister of Internal affairs, it was during his time that the national ID card programme and distribution was enhanced to reach all corners of the country. It was also during his time as internal affairs minister that the Nigerian Security and Civil Defence Corps was restructured and given additional function in the federal government.

In May 2006, Mohammed and his colleague Ambassador Idris Waziri the minister of Commerce resigned to contest the governors of their respective states as the rule was that political appointees had to resign from their positions if they had to contest any electoral office at that time.
