= Mohammed Maigari Dingyadi =

Nigerian politician

Mohammed Maigari Dingyadi (born 1953) is a Nigerian politician. He currently serves as the Minister of Labour and Employment. He had previously served as Minister of Police Affairs appointed on August 19, 2019 by President Muhammed Buhari. Dingyadi served as Minister of Police Affairs till 29 May 2023 when the tenure of Muhammed Buhari ended.

Dingyadi was born in Dingyadi, Sokoto. He is a 1978 graduate of Ahmadu Bello University.
