= Iyorchia Ayu =

Nigerian politician (born 1952)

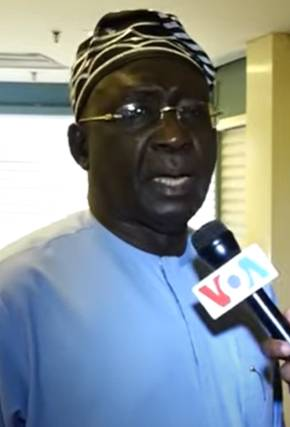
- Ayu in 2023
- Preceded by: Bala Mande

National Chairman of the Peoples Democratic Party
- Incumbent
- Assumed office 2021 on suspension since 24 March 2024
- Preceded by: Prince Uche Secondus

5th President of the Nigerian Senate
- In office 5 December 1992 – November 1993
- Preceded by: Joseph Wayas (1983)
- Succeeded by: Ameh Ebute

Federal Minister of Environment
- In office June 2005 – December 2005
- President: Olusegun Obasanjo
- Succeeded by: Helen Esuene

Federal Minister of Internal Affairs
- In office July 2003 – June 2005
- President: Olusegun Obasanjo
- Preceded by: Mohammed Shata
- Succeeded by: Magaji Muhammed

Federal Minister of Industry
- In office June 1999 – 2001
- President: Olusegun Obasanjo
- Succeeded by: Stephen Akiga

Federal Minister of Education
- In office 1993–1998

Senator for Benue North-West
- In office 5 December 1992 – 17 November 1993
- Succeeded by: Joseph Waku (1999)

Personal details
- Born: 15 November 1952 (age 73) Gboko, Northern Region, British Nigeria (now in Benue State, Nigeria)
- Party: Peoples Democratic Party
- Education: University of Jos

Iyorchia Ayu (born 15 November 1952) is a Nigerian politician; he is a former chairman of the Peoples Democratic Party (PDP) National Working Committee. A former Nigerian senator, he served as the 5th president of the Nigerian Senate in the Nigerian Third Republic (1992–1993).

He later served in various ministerial positions in the Cabinet of President Olusegun Obasanjo between 1999 and 2007.

== Early career ==
Ayu was born in Gboko in Benue State. He taught sociology in the University of Jos in Plateau State, including courses on the art and science of Marxism, and was the chairman of the Jos University chapter of Academic Staff Union of Universities (ASUU).

After entering politics, he was influential among the majority of Tiv people in his home state of Benue. He was elected senator in the Third Republic on the platform of the Social Democratic Party (SDP) and became Senate president.

In November 1993, the senate impeached Ayu, who was a strong opponent of the Interim National Government established after the elected president Moshood Kashimawo Olawale Abiola had been prevented from taking office.

However, he later became the minister for education in General Sani Abacha's military government. In March 1994 he chaired a workshop on technical education in Nigeria, seeking ways to learn from Germany, the United States, Britain and Japan.

== Obasanjo Cabinet ==
Ayu was said to be political godfather to George Akume, Governor of Benue State from 1999 to 2007.

Ayu assisted in the 1998–1999 campaign to elect President Olusegun Obasanjo on the People's Democratic Party (PDP platform). Obasanjo appointed him Industry Ministry from 1999 to 2000.

Ayu was appointed minister of internal affairs in July 2003.

In September 2003 Ayu announced that Nigeria was negotiating security pacts with its northern neighbors Niger and Chad to clamp down on smuggling, human-trafficking and cross-border banditry.

In June 2004 he inaugurated the Prisons Monitoring Committee to secure the rights of prisoners to acceptable conditions.

In August 2004, Ayu said that his ministry had started the distribution of national identity cards. The new card was to serve for identification purposes and for validation of other documents, such as passports and driving licences. It would also be a tool for controlling migration flows, generating data for government planning, and detecting crimes.

During a cabinet reshuffle in June 2005, Ayu was reassigned to become minister of environment.

At in a meeting in Rotterdam in September 2005, Ayu called for an effective, sufficient and predictable financial mechanism to provide the technical skills and infrastructure needed for African countries to handle chemicals safely.

In October that year, Ayu called for fair access to UNDP/GEF funds, and for increased allocations to developing countries.

In December 2005 he spoke at a conference on Integrated Coastal Area Management (ICAM). He praised the holistic, multi-sectoral approach of ICAM as a way to manage the regional ecosystem.

In December 2005, Obasanjo dismissed Ayu, giving no reason.

== Other activities ==
After falling out with Obasanjo, Ayu left the PDP and joined the Action Congress (AC).

=== Head of Atiku's campaign ===
He was head of the campaign to elect Vice President Atiku Abubakar as president on the AC platform in April 2007.

=== Ayu's arrest ===
In February 2007, Ayu was arrested and later arraigned by a federal court on charges of terrorism. He was later released on bail.

In March 2007, he spoke out against the failure of the Independent National Electoral Commission (INEC) to include Atiku's name on the list of candidates.

=== PDP's national chairman ===
On October 31, 2021, Ayu emerged as the new national chairman of the Peoples Democratic Party (PDP).

Ayu, a consensus candidate for the position, took over the leadership of the main opposition party alongside 20 others elected into various positions within the PDP National Working Committee.

On March 26, 2023, Iyorchia Ayu who was the national chairman of the PDP, was suspended by the party. The suspension of Ayu was effected by the Ward Executive of the party in Igyorov Ward of Gboko Local Government Area, LGA, of Benue state.

== Bibliography ==
- Ayu, Iyorchia D. (1986). Essays in popular struggle. Zim Pan African Publishers. ISBN 978-2150-02-9.
