= Ibrahim Lame =

Nigerian politician and educator (1953–2019)

Ibrahim Yakubu Lame

Senator
- In office 1992–1993

Minister of Police Affairs
- In office 17 December 2008 – March 2010
- President: Umaru Yar’Adua

Personal details
- Born: 10 February 1953 Bauchi State, Nigeria
- Died: 25 May 2019 (aged 66) Abuja, Nigeria

Ibrahim Yakubu Lame (10 February 1953 – 25 May 2019) was a Nigerian educator and politician, who was elected as senator in 1992 during the Third Republic, appointed Senior Special Assistant to President Olusegun Obasanjo in August 1999, and appointed Minister of Police Affairs by President Umaru Yar'Adua in December 2008.

== Background ==
Ibrahim Yakubu Lame was born on February 10, 1953, in Bauchi. He attended Ahmadu Bello University, Zaria, where he obtained a B.Sc. Political Science, then attended Ohio University, Athens, Ohio, United States where he earned a Ph.D. Higher Education Administration. He was appointed Assistant Registrar of Bauchi College of Arts and Science, Bauchi State, in 1978. He became the college’s principal in 1984. From 1985 to 1987 he was Commissioner for Education. In 1992 he was elected Senator. From 1998 to 1999 he was the People's Democratic Party (PDP) deputy national secretary.

In August 1999 he was appointed Senior Special Assistant to President Olusegun Obasanjo, advising on Narcotics and Financial Crime. In 2002 he was Director General of the Peoples Democratic Institute, and was seen as a possible PDP candidate for governor of Bauchi State in the April 2003 elections.

== Minister of Police Affairs ==
On 17 December 2008, President Umaru Yar'Adua appointed him Minister of Police Affairs. Soon after taking office, he noted that there were major problems with the police force. Detention cells and barracks were in bad shape, there was a severe lack of vehicles and community relations needed improvement. In November 2009, he responded to allegations that N3.5 billion released for crime prevention and control in seven cities had gone astray, saying the money was intact but there had been delays in awarding the projects.
