= Stephen Akiga =

Federal minister of Nigeria

Stephen Ibn Akiga

Minister of Industry
- In office 2000 – 30 January 2001
- Preceded by: Iyorchia Ayu
- Succeeded by: Magaji Muhammed

Minister of Police Affairs
- In office 9 February 2001 – May 2002
- Preceded by: David Jemibewon

Minister of Sports
- In office May 2002 – May 2003
- Preceded by: Ishaya Mark Aku
- Succeeded by: Musa Mohammed

Personal details
- Died: 6 September 2004 (aged 61–62)
- Party: People's Democratic Party (PDP)

Stephen Ibn Akiga (or Steve Akiga) (died 6 September 2004) was a Nigerian Minister of Industry, then Minister of Police Affairs and finally Minister of Sports in the first cabinet of President Olusegun Obasanjo.

Obasanjo dismissed his cabinet on 30 January 2001. On 9 February Stephen Akiga moved from the Ministry of Industry to Police Affairs. In May 2001 Akiga said the police could soon phase out use of sub-machine guns in an effort to stop cases of accidental discharge of bullets.

In May 2002 Akiga was appointed Minister of Sports to replace Ishaya Mark Aku, who had died in a plane crash. In August 2002 Akiga admitted that Nigeria was having difficulty in preparing to host the 2003 Africa Games, but said that a bid to host the 2012 Olympic Games was planned. In January 2003 Akiga announced that Nigeria had formed a committee to organize the bid for the 2010 soccer World Cup. In May 2003, during the delay before Obasanjo named his new cabinet following the elections, there were reports that workers in the Sports Ministry had embarked on "serious fasting and prayer" to ensure that God did not return Akiga to them.

== Death ==
Akiga died on 6 September 2004.
