= Adamu Waziri =

Nigerian politician

Adamu Maina Waziri
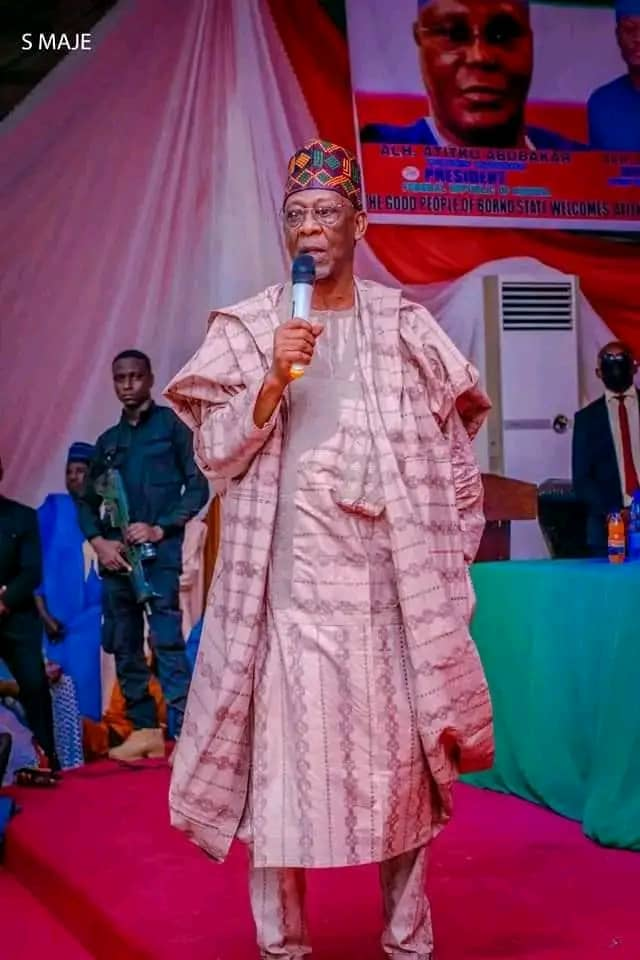

Federal Minister of State for Agriculture
- In office July 2007 – 29 October 2008

Minister of Police Affairs
- In office 6 April 2010 – 2015
- Preceded by: Ibrahim Lame
- Succeeded by: Muhammad Maigari Dingyadi

Personal details
- Born: 14 September 1952 (age 73)
- Party: PDP

Adamu Maina Waziri (born 14 September 1952) was appointed Nigerian minister of Police Affairs on 6 April 2010, when Acting President Goodluck Jonathan announced his new cabinet.

Waziri was born in Yobe State on 14 September 1952. He earned a BSc and an MBA from Ahmadu Bello University, Zaria. He became a lecturer at the University of Maiduguri in 1979.

Positions in private industry included Executive Director, Hydro Quest Nigeria and Chief Executive, Bogaru International. In the government, he served on the Students Loans Board, Federal Ministry of Education, and was Special Assistant to the Minister of Agriculture, Senior Special Assistant to the President, Coordinator of the National Poverty Eradication program and Chairman of the Road Safety Commission. He was Executive Secretary, Petroleum Technology Development Fund between 2005 and 2006.

Waziri was the People's Democratic Party (PDP) Candidate for Yobe State Governor in the 2007 elections. After the election of President Umaru Musa Yar'Adua, he was appointed Minister of State in the Federal Ministry of Agriculture and Water Resources. On 29 October 2008 he was dropped in a cabinet reshuffle. Waziri was a member of the Good Governance Group led by Ken Nnamani that led the drive for the transfer of power from Umaru Yar'Adua to Jonathan.
