= List of governors of Yobe State =

List of all governors of Yobe State

This is a list of administrators and governors of Yobe State, Nigeria. Yobe state was formed on 27 August 1991 when it was split off from Borno State.

Name	Title	Took office	Left office	Party
Sani Daura Ahmed	Administrator	28 August 1991	2 January 1992	Military
Bukar Ibrahim	Governor	2 January 1992	17 November 1993	SDP
Dabo Aliyu	Administrator	9 December 1993	22 August 1996	Military
John Ben Kalio	Administrator	22 August 1996	14 August 1998	Military
Musa Mohammed	Administrator	14 August 1998	29 May 1999	Military
Bukar Ibrahim	Governor	29 May 1999	29 May 2007	APP; ANPP
Mamman Bello Ali	Governor	29 May 2007	27 January 2009	ANPP
Ibrahim Gaidam	Governor	27 January 2009	29 May 2019	ANPP later APC
Mai Mala Buni	Governor	29 May 2019	Incumbent	APC

== See also ==
- List of state governors of Nigeria
- States of Nigeria
