= Bukar Ibrahim =

Nigerian politician (1950–2024)

Senator for Yobe East
- In office 5 June 2007 – 9 June 2019
- Preceded by: Usman Adamu
- Succeeded by: Ibrahim Gaidam

Governor of Yobe State
- In office 29 May 1999 – 29 May 2007
- Deputy: Aliyu Sale Bagare
- Preceded by: Musa Mohammed
- Succeeded by: Mamman Bello Ali
- In office January 1992 – November 1993
- Preceded by: Sani Daura Ahmed
- Succeeded by: Dabo Aliyu

Personal details
- Born: October 1950
- Died: 4 February 2024 (aged 73) Madinah, Saudi Arabia
- Party: Social Democratic Party (1991–1993); All Nigeria People's Party (1998–2014); All Progressives Congress (2014–2024)
- Spouses: Maryam Ibrahim; Aishatu Ibrahim; Khadija Ibrahim
- Education: Ahmadu Bello University
- Occupation: Politician

Bukar Abba Ibrahim (Walin Gujba) (October 1950 – 4 February 2024) was a Nigerian politician who served as the senator representing the Yobe East senatorial district from 2007 to 2019. He previously served twice as the governor of Yobe State from 1992 to 1993 and from 1999 to 2007.

== Background ==
Bukar Abba Ibrahim was born in Ancient Goniri Town now Gujba Local Government. October 1950, but never knew the precise date. He began attending Central primary school Goniri in 1957. In 1965, he proceeded to Government College in Maiduguri. After taking the West African School Certificate Examination in 1970, he was admitted to Ahmadu Bello University in 1972 where he obtained his Bachelor of Science degree in Quantity Surveying in 1975 Graduated With First Class. Thereafter, he undertook post-graduate professional training in the United Kingdom from 1981 to 1982, which led to his qualification as an associate member of the Nigeria Institute of Quantity Surveyors.

From 1985 to 1988, he worked as a civil servant in Borno State eventually becoming Commissioner of Works.

Ibrahim, a Muslim, was married to three wives: Hajiya (Dr) Maryam Ibrahim, Hajiya Aishatu Ibrahim (Late)and Khadija Ibrahim

Bukar Ibrahim died in Madinah, Saudi Arabia on 4 February 2024, at the age of 73.

== Gubernatorial career ==
In December 1991, a few months after Yobe State was created, Ibrahim contested and won the gubernatorial election under the banner of the Social Democratic Party (SDP). He held that position until in November 1993, when the military took control of government.

Nigeria transitioned from military to civilian rule beginning in late 1998. Gubernatorial elections were held in January 1999 and Ibrahim was again elected governor, this time under the banner of the All People's Party (APP), and took office on 29 May 1999. The APP was later renamed All Nigeria People's Party (ANPP) due to a factional split. He was re-elected in 2003 for a second four-year term and was one of only four incumbent (ANPP) governors to maintain their positions.

During his first term, on 5 August 1993 Ibrahim split the state's four emirates into 13. This change was reversed by the military regime of Sani Abacha. In his second term after the return to democracy, on 6 January 2000, he re-implemented the new emirates, adding Ngazargamu, Gujba, Nguru, Tikau, Pataskum, Yusufari, Gudi, Fune and Jajere. The Emir of Fika, Muhammadu Abali, protested at the break-up of his emirate and took the government to court, but eventually accepted the change.

== Senatorial career ==
In 2007, he was elected to the Senate for the Yobe East constituency. He ran for re-election in the 9 April 2011 Senatorial contest for Yobe East on the ANPP platform, and won with 115,763 votes against former Senator Lawan Jalo Zarami of the People's Democratic Party (PDP), who gained 67,438 votes.
