= Ibrahim Gaidam =

Nigerian politician (born 1956)

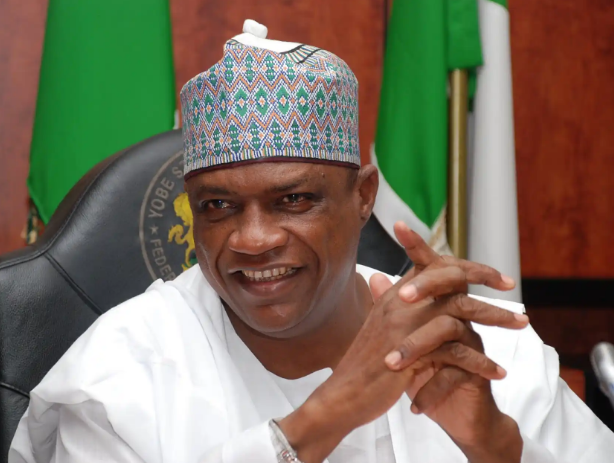

Minister of Police Affairs
- Incumbent
- Assumed office 21 August 2023
- President: Bola Tinubu
- Minister of State: Imaan Sulaiman-Ibrahim
- Preceded by: Mohammed Maigari Dingyadi

Senator for Yobe East
- In office 11 June 2019 – 21 August 2023
- Preceded by: Bukar Abba Ibrahim
- Succeeded by: Musa Mustapha

Governor of Yobe State
- In office 27 January 2009 – 29 May 2019
- Deputy: Abubakar Ali
- Preceded by: Mamman Bello Ali
- Succeeded by: Mai Mala Buni

Deputy Governor of Yobe State
- In office 29 May 2007 – 27 January 2009
- Governor: Mamman Bello Ali
- Preceded by: Aliyu Saleh Bagare
- Succeeded by: Abubakar Ali

Personal details
- Born: 15 September 1956 (age 70) Bukarti, Yunusari, Northern Region, British Nigeria (now in Yobe State, Nigeria)
- Party: All Progressive Congress (since 2013)
- Other political affiliations: All Nigeria Peoples Party (before 2013)
- Occupation: Politician

Ibrahim Gaidam (born 15 September 1956) is a Nigerian politician and the current Minister of Police Affairs since 2023. He previously served as senator representing the Yobe East senatorial district from 2019 to 2023, and as governor of Yobe State from 2009 to 2019.

Gaidam became governor of Yobe State following the death of Governor Mamman Bello Ali on 26 January 2009. He previously served as deputy to Mamman Ali from 2007 to 2009.

== Background ==
Ibrahim Gaidam was born on 15 September 1956 in Bukarti village, Yunusari local government area in present day Yobe State. He attended the Borno Teachers' College (BTC), Maiduguri from 1974 to 1979, where he obtained a Teachers' Certificate. He attended Ahmadu Bello University, Zaria from 1981 and 1983, earning a Diploma in Accountancy. Later he returned to Ahmadu Bello University, earned a BSc in Accountancy Degree in 1990 and became a member of the Certified Public Accountants of Nigeria.

== Public service career ==
As an accountant, Ibrahim Gaidam worked in several government ministries in the old Borno State, later Yobe State. He was assistant director of Finance in the Directorate of Foods, Roads and Rural Infrastructure, acting Director of Finance and Supplies in the Yobe Information and Culture Ministry. Ibrahim Gaidam left the civil service in 1995 when he was appointed the Commissioner for Youths and Sports, and then Commissioner of Commerce and Industries. He returned to the civil service and from 1997 to 2007, he was a Director in the State Finance Ministry and Permanent Secretary in various other ministries.

== Political career ==
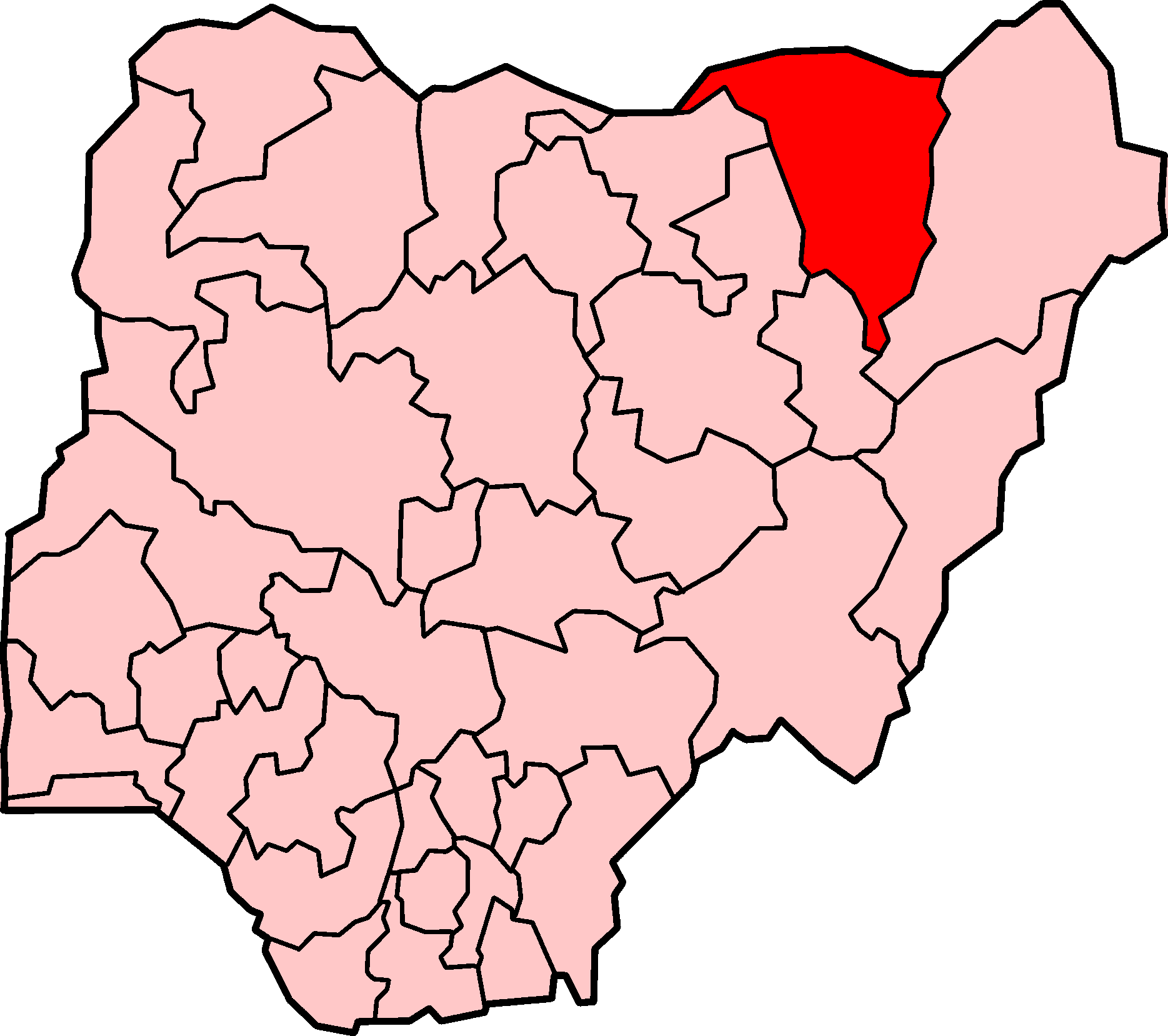
Location of Yobe State in Nigeria

In April 2007, Ibrahim Gaidam was elected deputy governor of Yobe State on the All Nigeria Peoples Party (ANPP) platform, and was sworn into office on 29 May 2007. He was sworn in as governor of Yobe State on 27 January 2009, following the death of Governor Mamman Bello Ali in Florida from a liver related problem. Alhaji Abubakar Ali, brother of Mamman Ali, was named as the new deputy governor.

Gaidam was appointed chair of the ANPP tactical committee for the 2011 elections.

Following violence and rioting incited by the Boko Haram radical Islamic sect in July 2009 in northern Nigeria, the Northern Governors' Forum (NGF) called an emergency meeting in Kaduna to discuss security matters. Of the nineteen governors of northern Nigeria, only Mu'azu Babangida Aliyu of Niger, Mohammed Namadi Sambo of Kaduna and Ibrahim Gaidam of Yobe attended in person.

In November 2009, Ibrahim Gaidam gave a Sallah goodwill message to the people of Yobe State on the occasion of the Eid el-Kabir celebration. In his speech, he cautioned youths against being incited to violence by selfish religious teachers and rumour mongers, referring to the violence in July 2009. He called on all Muslims to cooperate with each other and to co-habit peacefully with followers of other religions in the state.

Gaidam was elected on 26 April 2011 for his first full term as governor.

Gaidam was re-elected on 11 April 2015 for a second term as governor.

Geidam was elected as senator representing Yobe East in 9th NASS on 23 March 2019.

== See also ==
- List of governors of Yobe State
