= Mamman Bello Ali =

Nigerian politician (1958–2009)

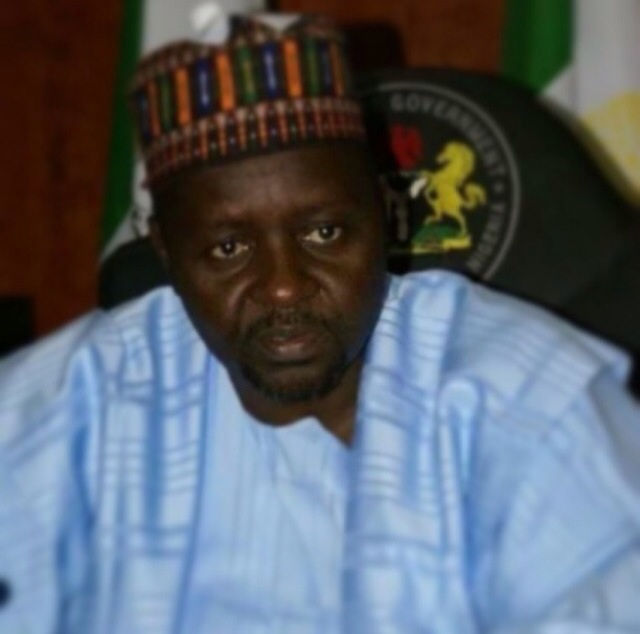

Governor of Yobe State
- In office 29 May 2007 – 26 January 2009
- Deputy: Ibrahim Geidam
- Preceded by: Bukar Abba Ibrahim
- Succeeded by: Ibrahim Geidam

Senator for Yobe South
- In office 3 June 1999 – 5 June 2007
- Succeeded by: Adamu Garba Talba

Personal details
- Born: 1958
- Died: 26 January 2009 (aged 50–51)
- Party: All Nigeria Peoples Party

Mamman Bello Ali (1958 – 26 January 2009) was a Nigerian politician who served as the governor of Yobe State from 2007 until his death in Florida USA 2009. He previously served as the senator representing the Yobe South senatorial district from 1999 to 2007. He was the chairman senate committee on public account from 1999 to 2007. He was a member of the All Nigeria Peoples Party (ANPP).

He was regarded as one of the revolutionary Yobe State leaders of all time due to his massive contributions and exceptional reforms especially in the educational and health sectors across the state.

== Personal life ==
Mamman Bello Ali was born in 1958 in Jimeta town of Adamawa state, Nigeria. Mamman lived in his father's house in Jimeta and spent most of his time there, sometimes he spent his time with his friend Alhaji Mouktar Garba Ibrahim of Attah's Family. The two places were the famous places he was mostly found during his life time. Mamman died on 26 January 2009 when he was receiving his medical treatment for leukemia in a Florida hospital.

== Education background ==
Mamman Bello Ali did his primary and secondary education in Jimeta. He attended Numan Craft School in Gongola state. Mamman, also attended Kaduna Polytechnic for his Higher National Diploma (HND). In 1982 he proceeded for his National Service (NYSC) in Kaduna and later started working in Abuja, Nigeria.

== Career ==
Mamman later, started his public career in Borno Civil service where he worked as a senior engineer for 15 years. He obtained his Higher National Diploma in Civil Engineering from Kaduna Polytechnic and two degrees in Extension and Construction from Tuskegee Institute in the United States. In 1989 Mamman became Executive Director of SGC as a joint venture till 1991 and a managing Director/CEO MAL Nigeria Limited from 1991 to 1999. He served as the chairman of the committee in the FCT for six Months and in those six months he was also the Visa-Chairman, Senate Committee on internal Affairs. Mamman was a chairman of the Senate Public Accounts Committee from 1999 to 2007 and chairman of ECOWAS Parliament Party. He also became the Governor of Yobe State in 2007 until his death in 2009.

== Contributions ==
During his stewardship, his government opened a lot of opportunities for the people of Yobe state. He constructed a lot of roads within the state thereby opening up the state for both industrial and commercial purposes. Late Mamaan provided infrastructural and school equipment to Yobe secondary school, he also up graded teacher's salary scale. Late Mamman did rehabilitation of a number of health sectors across the state.
