= 2019 Akwa Ibom State House of Assembly election =

Nigerian State election

The 2019 Akwa Ibom State House of Assembly election was held on 9 March 2019, to elect members of the Akwa Ibom State House of Assembly in Nigeria. All the 26 seats were up for election in the Akwa Ibom State House of Assembly.

Aniekan Bassey from PDP representing Uruan constituency was elected Speaker, while Felicia Bassey from PDP representing Okobo constituency was elected Deputy Speaker.

== Results ==
The result of the election is listed below.

- Aniekan Uko from PDP won Ibesikpo Asutan constituency
- David Lawrence Udofa from PDP won Eket constituency
- Felicia Bassey from PDP won Okobo constituency
- Otuekong Nse Essien from PDP won Onna constituency
- Idongesit Ntekpere from PDP won Ikot Ekpene/Obot Akara constituency
- Uduak Odudoh from PDP won Ikot Abasi/Eastern Obolo constituency
- Emmanuel Ekpenyong Bassey from PDP won Ini constituency
- Aniefiok Dennis from PDP won Etinan constituency
- Usoro Akpanusoh from PDP won Esit Eket/Ibeno constituency
- Mark Esset from PDP won Nsit Atai constituency
- Effiong Okon Bassey from PDP won Oron/Udung Uko constituency
- Udo Kerian Akpan from PDP won Oruk Anam constituency
- Aniekan Bassey from PDP won Uruan constituency
- Asuquo E. Archibong from PDP won Urue Offong Oruko constituency
- Anietie B. Eka from PDP won Uyo constituency
- Otobong Effiong Bob from PDP won Nsit Ubium constituency
- Udeme J. Otong from PDP won Abak constituency
- Mfon Frank Idung from PDP won Etim Ekpo/Ika constituency
- Godwin James Ekpo from PDP won Ibiono Ibom constituency
- Asuquo Nana Udo from PDP won Ikono constituency
- Kufre-Abasi Edidem from PDP won Itu constituency
- Okon Asuquo Frank from PDP won Mbo constituency
- Victor Patrick Ekwere from PDP won Mkpat Enin constituency
- Ifiok Okon Udoh from PDP won Nsit Ibom constituency
- Charity Friday Ido from PDP won Ukanafun constituency
- Esse Umoh from PDP won Essien udim constituency
