= 2023 Akwa Ibom State House of Assembly election =

- 11 March 2023

All 26 seats in the Akwa Ibom State House of Assembly 13 seats needed for a majority
	Majority party	Minority party	Third party
Party	PDP	YPP	APC
Last election	24 (Note: The 2019 election in the PDP-held constituency of Essien Udim was partially voided and a supplementary election was called. Although the PDP retained the seat in the supplementary election, the elections were held in early 2020 so the party's 2019 total is 24 seats.)	0	1
Seats before	24	2	0
Speaker before election
Aniekan Bassey
PDP
Elected Speaker
TBD

The 2023 Akwa Ibom State House of Assembly election took place on 11 March 2023, to elect members of the Akwa Ibom State House of Assembly. The election was held concurrent with the state gubernatorial election as well as twenty-seven other gubernatorial elections and elections to all other state houses of assembly. It was held three weeks after the presidential election and National Assembly elections.

== Electoral system ==
The members of state Houses of Assembly are elected using first-past-the-post voting in single-member constituencies.

== Background ==
In the previous House of Assembly elections, the PDP won a sizeable majority that elected Aniekan Bassey (PDP-Uruan) as Speaker. In other Akwa Ibom elections, incumbent Governor Udom Gabriel Emmanuel (PDP) won in a landslide. The PDP was also successful federally, unseating all APC senators and house members to sweep all three senates and ten House of Representatives seats as the state was easily won by PDP presidential nominee Atiku Abubakar with about 68% but still swung towards the APC and had lower turnout.

Key events during the legislative term included the belated swearing-in of the Assembly's sole APC member—Effiong Johnson (Note: This Assembly member was elected as a member of the APC but switched to the PDP during their term.) (Mbo)—in December 2019, reports on systemic misappropriation of public funds and corruption by the Assembly, and votes on various constitutional amendments in July 2022.

== Overview ==
Affiliation	Party				Total
Affiliation	PDP	APC	YPP	Vacant	Total
Previous Election	24	1	0	1 (Note: The 2019 election in the constituency of Essien Udim was partially voided and a supplementary election was called. As the supplementary election was held in early 2020, the post-2019 elections vacancy total is 1 seat.)	26
Before Election	24	0	2	0	26
After Election	TBD	TBD	TBD	TBD	26

== Summary ==
Constituency	Incumbent		Results	
Constituency	Incumbent	Party	Status	Candidates
Abak	Udeme Otong	PDP	Incumbent renominated	▌Emmanuel Udosen (APC); ▌Udeme Otong (PDP)
Eket	David Lawrence Udofa	PDP	Incumbent retiring	▌Abasiandikan Robert Nkono (APC); ▌Nsidibe Inyang Akata (PDP)
Esit Eket/Ibeno	Usoro Akpanusoh (Note: The positions of MHA Usoro Akpanusoh (YPP-Esit Eket/Ibeno) and MHA Asuquo Nana Udo (YPP-Ikono) is unclear due to their removal from the Assembly in September 2022 after their defection to the YPP. However, after the removal, Akpanusoh and Udo approached the judiciary to retain their seats.)	YPP (Note: This Assembly member was elected as a member of the PDP but switched to the YPP during their term.)	Incumbent lost renomination Incumbent nominated by new party	▌Emmanuel Israel Peter (APC); ▌Udobia Friday Udo (PDP); ▌Usoro Akpanusoh (YPP)
Essien Udim	Esse Umoh	PDP	Incumbent lost renomination	▌Uduak Etim Udom (APC); ▌Ukpong Akpabio (PDP)
Etim Ekpo/Ika	Mfon Idung	PDP	Incumbent renominated	▌Christopher Sandy Okorie (APC); ▌Mfon Idung (PDP)
Etinan	Aniefiok Dennis Akpan	PDP	Status unknown	▌Enobong Eshiet (APC); ▌Uduak Ekpo-Ufot (PDP)
Ibesikpo Asutan	Aniekan Uko	PDP	Incumbent retiring	▌Esitima Udosen (APC); ▌Ubong Attah (PDP)
Ibiono Ibom	Godwin Ekpo	PDP	Incumbent renominated	▌Ndifreke Ndanyongmong Ukem (APC); ▌Godwin Ekpo (PDP)
Ikono	Asuquo Nana Udo	YPP	Incumbent lost renomination Incumbent nominated by new party	▌Justice Tony Umoh (APC); ▌Itoro Columba (PDP); ▌Asuquo Nana Udo (YPP)
Ikot Abasi/Eastern Obolo	Uduak Odudoh	PDP	Incumbent retiring	▌John Richard Ayang (APC); ▌Selinah Isotuk Ukpatu (PDP)
Ikot Ekpene/Obot Akara	Idongesit Ntekpere	PDP	Incumbent retiring	▌Gloria Iniobong Useh (APC); ▌Jerry Otu (PDP)
Ini	Emmanuel Ekpenyong Bassey	PDP	Status unknown	▌Ernest Edet Udo (APC); ▌Lawrence Udoide (PDP)
Itu	KufreAbasi Edidem	PDP	Incumbent renominated	▌Imoh Anthony Offiong (APC); ▌KufreAbasi Edidem (PDP)
Mbo	Effiong Johnson	PDP	Incumbent nominated	▌Eyo Asuquo Okpo (APC); ▌Effiong Johnson (PDP)
Mkpat Enin	Victor Patrick Ekwere	PDP	Status unknown	▌Ini Judah Ekpo (APC); ▌Uwem Imoh-Ita (PDP)
Nsit Atai	Mark Esset	PDP	Status unknown	▌Isaac Simon Etuketuk (APC); ▌Aniefiok Attah (PDP)
Nsit Ibom	Ifiok Udoh	PDP	Incumbent retiring	▌Nathaniel Otio (APC); ▌Eric Akpan (PDP)
Nsit Ubium	Otobong Bob	PDP	Incumbent renominated	▌Utibeabasi Idem (APC); ▌Otobong Bob (PDP)
Okobo	Felicia Bassey	PDP	Incumbent retiring	▌John Asuquo Ita (APC); ▌Bassey Pius Bassey (PDP)
Onna	Otuekong Nse Essien	PDP	Status unknown	▌James Akpan Enoh (APC); ▌Sunday Udofot Johnny (PDP)
Oron/Udung Uko	Effiong Okon Bassey	PDP	Status unknown	▌Esang Bisung Uwe (APC); ▌Ekenim Onofiok (PDP)
Oruk Anam	Udo Kerian Akpan	PDP	Status unknown	▌Aniekan Solomon Abraham (APC); ▌Sampson Idiong (PDP)
Ukanafun	Charity Ido	PDP	Incumbent lost renomination	▌Ubokobong Ezekiel Umoh (APC); ▌Emem Udom (PDP)
Uruan	Aniekan Bassey	PDP	Incumbent retiring	▌Effiong Edet Awat (APC); ▌Itoro Etim (PDP)
Urue Offong/Oruko	Asuquo Edet Archibong	PDP	Status unknown	▌Effiong Okon Oboho (APC); ▌Precious Selong (PDP)
Uyo	Anietie Eka	PDP	Incumbent retiring	▌Efiok Wilson Udom (APC); ▌Uwemedimo Asuquo (PDP)

== See also ==
- 2023 Nigerian elections
- 2023 Nigerian House of Assembly elections
