= 2023 Yobe State gubernatorial election =

2023 gubernatorial election in Yobe State, Nigeria

- 18 March 2023
- Registered: 1,485,146
Nominee	Mai Mala Buni	Sharif Abdullahi
Party	APC	PDP
Running mate	Idi Barde Gubana	Abubakar Bashir Sadiq
Popular vote	317,113	124,259
Percentage	71.33%	27.95%
Governor before election
Mai Mala Buni
APC
Elected Governor
Mai Mala Buni
APC

The 2023 Yobe State gubernatorial election took place on 18 March 2023, to elect the Governor of Yobe State, concurrent with elections to the Yobe State House of Assembly as well as twenty-seven other gubernatorial elections and elections to all other state houses of assembly. The election — which was postponed from its original 11 March date — was held three weeks after the presidential election and National Assembly elections. Incumbent APC Governor Mai Mala Buni won re-election to a second term, defeating former Bade Local Government Chairman Sharif Abdullahi (PDP) by a margin of 43%.

The primaries, scheduled for between 4 April and 9 June 2022, resulted in Buni being renominated by the All Progressives Congress unopposed on 26 May while the Peoples Democratic Party nominated Abdullahi on 25 May.

On 21 March, INEC declared Buni as the victor with official totals showing him winning just over 317,000 votes (~71% of the vote) to defeat Abdullahi with about 124,000 votes (~28% of the vote). However, Abdullahi rejected the results due to alleged electoral misconduct.

== Electoral system ==
The Governor of Yobe State is elected using a modified two-round system. To be elected in the first round, a candidate must receive the plurality of the vote and over 25% of the vote in at least two-thirds of the state's local government areas. If no candidate passes this threshold, a second round will be held between the top candidate and the next candidate to have received a plurality of votes in the highest number of local government areas.

== Background ==
Yobe State is a large, diverse northeastern state in the process of recovering from the Boko Haram insurgency. Still facing threats from Boko Haram and ISWAP, the state also contended with an underdeveloped yet vital agricultural sector, desertification, and low education rates.

Politically, the 2019 elections confirmed Yobe's status as one of the most staunchly APC states in the nation as both Buhari and Buni won the state by wide margins and every single legislative seat on the senatorial, house of representatives, and house of assembly levels were carried by APC nominees.

Over the course of Buni's term, his administration stated focuses included rebuilding the state's educational system, timely payment of civil servant salaries, and upgrading and repairing transportation infrastructure. However, Buni's political situation changed about 13 months into his term when he was appointed National Caretaker Chairman of All Progressives Congress; choosing to serve in the Abuja-based position while continuing as governor was controversial, even more so after he admitted to spending only "three or four days in Yobe" every month. Questioned by the PDP over the constitutionality of holding the second job, Buni remained at the helm of the APC until the party's March 2022 convention. After leaving office, analysts questioned if Buni could successfully return to his state after withdrawing to Abuja for nearly two years and, supposedly, lobbying to become the party's vice presidential nominee instead of returning to the governorship.

== Primary elections ==
The primaries, along with any potential challenges to primary results, were to take place between 4 April and 3 June 2022 but the deadline was extended to 9 June.

=== All Progressives Congress ===
On 20 April 2022, the APC National Executive Committee announced the party's schedule for gubernatorial primaries, setting its expression of interest form price at ₦10 million and nomination form price at ₦40 million with a 50% nomination form discount for candidates younger than 40 while women and candidates with disabilities get free nomination forms. Forms were to be sold from 26 April to 6 May until the deadline was later extended to 10 May then 12 May. After the submission of nomination forms by 13 May, candidates were screened by a party committee on 14 and 15 May while 16 May was the date for the screening appeal process. Ward congresses and LGA congresses were set for between 7 and 9 May to elect delegates for the primary. Candidates approved by the screening process advanced to a primary set for 26 May, in concurrence with other APC gubernatorial primaries; challenges to the result could be made the next day.

On the primary date, Buni was the sole candidate and won the nomination unopposed. In his acceptance speech, Buni thanked the party while pledging to continue the work of his administration.

==== Nominated ====
- Mai Mala Buni: Governor (2019–present) and APC Caretaker National Chairman (2020–present)
  - Running mate—Idi Barde Gubana: Deputy Governor (2019–present)

==== Declined ====
- Mohammed Hassan: former Senator for Yobe South (2015–2019)

==== Results ====
APC primary results
Party	Candidate	Votes	%
APC	Mai Mala Buni	805	100.00%
Total votes		805	100.00%
Invalid or blank votes		20	N/A
Turnout		825	92.70%

=== People's Democratic Party ===
On 16 March 2022, the national PDP announced its gubernatorial primaries' schedule, setting its expression of interest form price at ₦1 million and the nomination form price at ₦20 million with a 50% discount for candidates between 25 and 30. Forms were to be sold until 1 April but the party later extended the deadline four times before reaching a final deadline of 22 April. After the submission of nomination forms by 25 April, candidates were screened by a party committee on 28 April while 2 May was the rescheduled date for the screening appeal process. Ward congresses were set for 29 April and LGA congresses were rescheduled for 10 May to elect delegates for the primary. Candidates approved by the screening process advanced to a primary set for 25 May, in concurrence with all other PDP gubernatorial primaries; challenges to the result could be made in the following days.

On primary day, three candidates contested an indirect primary at the August 27th Stadium in Damaturu that ended with Sharif Abdullahi emerging as the PDP nominee after results showed him winning about 55% of the delegates' votes.

==== Nominated ====
- Sharif Abdullahi: businessman and former Bade Local Government Chairman (1991–1993)
  - Running mate—Abubakar Bashir Sadiq

==== Eliminated in primary ====
- Ali Adamu Tikau
- Abba Gana Tata: state PDP chairman

==== Declined ====
- Umar Iliya Damagum: PDP Deputy National Chairman (North) (2020–present) and 2019 PDP gubernatorial nominee
- Aji Kolomi: 2019 APC gubernatorial candidate

==== Results ====
Candidates' vote share
1. Sharif Abdullahi (55.4%)
2. Ali Adamu Tikau (24.2%)
3. Abba Gana Tata (20.4%)

PDP primary results
Party	Candidate	Votes	%
PDP	Sharif Abdullahi	295	55.35%
PDP	Ali Adamu Tikau	129	24.20%
PDP	Abba Gana Tata	109	20.45%
Total votes		533	100.00%
Invalid or blank votes		6	N/A
Turnout		539	97.82%

=== Minor parties ===
- Mohammed Arabi (Action Alliance)
  - Running mate: Yahaya Lawan
- Adamu Umar (Action Democratic Party)
  - Running mate: Lawan Ibrahim
- Adamu Ahmed (Action Peoples Party)
  - Running mate: Adamu Isah Abubakar
- Mohammad Tilio Abdullahi (African Democratic Congress)
  - Running mate: Abdullahi Ahmadu
- Mohammed Bukar (Allied Peoples Movement)
  - Running mate: Musa Abubakar
- Muhammad Ahmed Yusufari (Labour Party)
  - Running mate: Salisu Abdulhamid Adaya
- Garba Umar (New Nigeria Peoples Party)
  - Running mate: Yahaya Abdullahi
- Audi Dalhatu (Social Democratic Party)
  - Running mate: Abdullahi Adamu
- Mohammed Maina (Young Progressives Party)
  - Running mate: Ari Gishuwa

== Campaign ==
In the months after the primaries, analysts noted the relative weakness of the PDP in Yobe along with several major defections from the party as reasons it would be difficult to challenge the strong APC hold on the state. However, the PDP claimed Abdullahi had mass grassroots support and would shock the APC while the APC used infrastructural projects as evidence of Buni's impact during his term in office.

By 2023, attention largely switched to the presidential election on 25 February. In the election, Yobe State voted for Atiku Abubakar (PDP); Abubakar won 52.5% of the vote, beating Bola Tinubu (APC) at 40.0%. The result—which was labeled as an upset as projections had favored Tinubu—led to increased attention on the gubernatorial race and its potential competitiveness. Gubernatorial campaign analysis from after the presidential election noted that PDP had gained momentum from the presidential results while a surprised APC was renewing campaign efforts. Nevertheless, the EiE-SBM forecast projected Buni to win while a Vanguard piece predicted that Buni was favoured but "may need to work harder for re-election."

== Projections ==
Source	Projection	As of
Africa Elects (Note: AfricaElects projections predict the likelihood of a candidate winning a state by categorizing a state as "Safe" for exceedingly likely, "Likely" for somewhat likely, and "Lean" for least likely. If no clear determination could be made, states are categorized as "tossups".)	Likely Buni	17 March 2023
Enough is Enough- SBM Intelligence (Note: EiE-SBM projections predict which candidates will win states.)	Buni	2 March 2023

== Conduct ==
=== Electoral timetable ===
On 26 February 2022, the Independent National Electoral Commission released the timetable, setting out key dates and deadlines for the election. Months later on 27 May 2022, INEC made a slight revision to the timetable, allowing parties extra time to conduct primaries.

- 28 February 2022 – Publication of Notice of Election
- 4 April 2022 – First day for the conduct of party primaries
- 9 June 2022 (Note: The original deadline was 3 June; however, INEC pushed it back to 9 June at the behest of parties.) – Final day for the conduct of party primaries, including the resolution of disputes arising from them
- 1 July 2022 – First day for submission of nomination forms to INEC via the online portal
- 15 July 2022 – Final day for submission of nomination forms to INEC via the online portal
- 12 October 2022 – Commencement of the official campaign period
- 16 March 2023 (Note: The original deadline was 9 March; however, INEC pushed it back to 16 March.) – Final day of the official campaign period

== General election ==
=== Results ===
2023 Yobe State gubernatorial election
Party	Candidate	Votes	%
AA	Mohammed Arabi		
ADP	Adamu Umar		
APP	Adamu Ahmed		
ADC	Mohammad Tilio Abdullahi		
APM	Mohammed Bukar		
APC	Mai Mala Buni		
LP	Muhammad Ahmed Yusufari		
New Nigeria Peoples Party	Garba Umar		
PDP	Sharif Abdullahi		
SDP	Audi Dalhatu		
YPP	Mohammed Maina		
Total votes			100.00%
Invalid or blank votes			N/A
Turnout			

==== By senatorial district ====
The results of the election by senatorial district.

Senatorial District	Mai Mala Buni APC		Sharif Abdullahi PDP		Others		Total Valid Votes
Senatorial District	Votes	Percentage	Votes	Percentage	Votes	Percentage	Total Valid Votes
Yobe East Senatorial District (Note: Comprising the local government areas of Bursari, Geidam, Gujba, Gulani, Tarmuwa, and Yunusari.)	TBD	%	TBD	%	TBD	%	TBD
Yobe North Senatorial District (Note: Comprising the local government areas of Bade, Jakusko, Karasuwa, Machina, Nguru, and Yusufari.)	TBD	%	TBD	%	TBD	%	TBD
Yobe South Senatorial District (Note: Comprising the local government areas of Damaturu, Fika, Fune, Nangere, and Potiskum.)	TBD	%	TBD	%	TBD	%	TBD
Totals	TBD	%	TBD	%	TBD	%	TBD

==== By federal constituency ====
The results of the election by federal constituency.

Federal Constituency	Mai Mala Buni APC		Sharif Abdullahi PDP		Others		Total Valid Votes
Federal Constituency	Votes	Percentage	Votes	Percentage	Votes	Percentage	Total Valid Votes
Bade/Jakusko Federal Constituency (Note: Comprising the local government areas of Bade and Jakusko.)	TBD	%	TBD	%	TBD	%	TBD
Bursari/Geidam/Yunusari Federal Constituency (Note: Comprising the local government areas of Bursari, Geidam, and Yunusari.)	TBD	%	TBD	%	TBD	%	TBD
Damaturu/Gujba/Gulani/Tarmuwa Federal Constituency (Note: Comprising the local government areas of Damaturu, Gujba, Gulani, and Tarmuwa.)	TBD	%	TBD	%	TBD	%	TBD
Fika/Fune Federal Constituency (Note: Comprising the local government areas of Fika and Fune.)	TBD	%	TBD	%	TBD	%	TBD
Machina/Nguru/Yusufari/Karasuwa Federal Constituency (Note: Comprising the local government areas of Karasuwa, Machina, Nguru, and Yusufari.)	TBD	%	TBD	%	TBD	%	TBD
Nangere/Potiskum Federal Constituency (Note: Comprising the local government areas of Nangere and Potiskum.)	TBD	%	TBD	%	TBD	%	TBD
Totals	TBD	%	TBD	%	TBD	%	TBD

==== By local government area ====
The results of the election by local government area.

LGA	Mai Mala Buni APC		Sharif Abdullahi PDP		Others		Total Valid Votes	Turnout Percentage
LGA	Votes	Percentage	Votes	Percentage	Votes	Percentage	Total Valid Votes	Turnout Percentage
Bade	TBD	%	TBD	%	TBD	%	TBD	%
Bursari	TBD	%	TBD	%	TBD	%	TBD	%
Damaturu	TBD	%	TBD	%	TBD	%	TBD	%
Fika	TBD	%	TBD	%	TBD	%	TBD	%
Fune	TBD	%	TBD	%	TBD	%	TBD	%
Geidam	TBD	%	TBD	%	TBD	%	TBD	%
Gujba	TBD	%	TBD	%	TBD	%	TBD	%
Gulani	TBD	%	TBD	%	TBD	%	TBD	%
Jakusko	TBD	%	TBD	%	TBD	%	TBD	%
Karasuwa	TBD	%	TBD	%	TBD	%	TBD	%
Machina	TBD	%	TBD	%	TBD	%	TBD	%
Nangere	TBD	%	TBD	%	TBD	%	TBD	%
Nguru	TBD	%	TBD	%	TBD	%	TBD	%
Potiskum	TBD	%	TBD	%	TBD	%	TBD	%
Tarmuwa	TBD	%	TBD	%	TBD	%	TBD	%
Yunusari	TBD	%	TBD	%	TBD	%	TBD	%
Yusufari	TBD	%	TBD	%	TBD	%	TBD	%
Totals	TBD	%	TBD	%	TBD	%	TBD	%

== See also ==
- 2023 Nigerian elections
- 2023 Nigerian gubernatorial elections
