= 2023 Yobe State House of Assembly election =

- 11 March 2023

All 24 seats in the Yobe State House of Assembly 13 seats needed for a majority
	Majority party	Minority party
Party	APC	PDP
Last election	23	1
Seats before	24	0
Speaker before election
Ahmed Lawan Mirwa
APC
Elected Speaker
TBD

The 2023 Yobe State House of Assembly election took place on 18 March 2023, to elect members of the Yobe State House of Assembly. The election was held concurrent with the state gubernatorial election as well as twenty-seven other gubernatorial elections and elections to all other state houses of assembly. It was held three weeks after the presidential election and National Assembly elections.

== Electoral system ==
The members of state Houses of Assembly are elected using first-past-the-post voting in single-member constituencies.

== Background ==
In the previous House of Assembly elections, the APC won a sizeable majority that elected Ahmed Lawan Mirwa (APC-Nguru II) as Speaker. In other Yobe elections, incumbent APC Governor Mai Mala Buni won in a landslide as the APC swept every House of Representatives and Senate seat along with Buhari winning the state in a landslide.

== Overview ==
Affiliation	Party		Total
Affiliation	APC	PDP	Total
Previous Election	23	1	24
Before Election	24	0	24
After Election	TBD	TBD	24

== Summary ==
Constituency	Incumbent		Results	
Constituency	Incumbent	Party	Status	Candidates
Bade East	Mohammed Maimota Kabir	APC	Incumbent renominated	▌Mohammed Maimota Kabir (APC); ▌Sadiq Yahaya (PDP)
Bade West	Gafo Mai Zabu Bizi	APC	Status unknown	▌Sanda Kara Bade (APC); ▌Saidu Dauda Dauda (PDP)
Bursari	Mala Lawan Jawa	APC	Status unknown	▌Zanna Baba Gana (APC); ▌Kolo Zanna (PDP)
Damagum	Maina Digma Gana	APC	Incumbent renominated	▌Maina Digma Gana (APC); ▌Musa Yakubu Damagum (PDP)
Damaturu I	Mohammad Bazani	APC	Status unknown	▌Nasiru Hassan Yusuf (APC); ▌Danbinta Bura (PDP)
Damaturu II	Buba Ibrahim	APC	Incumbent renominated	▌Buba Ibrahim (APC); ▌Modu Kaleranbe (PDP)
Fika/Ngalda	Yakubu Suleiman Maluri	APC	Incumbent renominated	▌Yakubu Suleiman Maluri (APC); ▌Usman Alhaji Barde (PDP)
Geidam North	Bukar Mustapha	APC	Incumbent renominated	▌Bukar Mustapha (APC); ▌Saleh Kachalla (PDP)
Geidam South	Mohammad Ali	APC	Incumbent renominated	▌Mohammad Ali (APC); ▌Mustapha Kale (PDP)
Goya/Ngeji	Ishaku Sani Audu	APC	Incumbent renominated	▌Ishaku Sani Audu (APC); ▌Babale Audu Maisamari (PDP)
Gujba	Bulama Bukar	APC	Incumbent renominated	▌Bulama Bukar (APC); ▌Mustapha Manu (PDP)
Gulani	Bularafa Bunu Zanna	APC	Incumbent renominated	▌Bularafa Bunu Zanna (APC); ▌Usman Hamisu (PDP)
Jajere	Chiroma A. Buba	APC	Incumbent renominated	▌Chiroma A. Buba (APC); ▌Mu'azu Shehu (PDP)
Jakusko	Ya’u Usman Dachia	APC	Incumbent renominated	▌Ya’u Usman Dachia (APC); ▌Badamasi Madaki (PDP)
Karasuwa	Adamu Dala-Dogo	APC	Incumbent renominated	▌Adamu Dala-Dogo (APC); ▌Haladu Buba (PDP)
Mamudo	Mohammed Isa Bello	APC	Incumbent renominated	▌Mohammed Isa Bello (APC); ▌Adamu Isa Barka (PDP)
Nangere	Saminu Musa Lawan	APC	Incumbent renominated	▌Saminu Musa Lawan (APC); ▌Muhammad Abdullahi Dagare (PDP)
Nguru I	Lawan Sani Inuwa	APC (Note: This Assembly member was elected as a member of the PDP but switched to the APC during their term.)	Incumbent nominated	▌Lawan Sani Inuwa (APC); ▌Salisu Lawan Idriss (PDP)
Nguru II	Ahmed Lawan Mirwa	APC	Incumbent renominated	▌Ahmed Lawan Mirwa (APC); ▌Musa Lawan (PDP)
Potiskum	Abdullahi Adamu Bazuwa	APC	Incumbent retiring	▌ Ahmed Adamu (APC); ▌Adamu Ibrahim Na'Ibbi (PDP)
Tarmuwa	Buba Saleh Maina	APC	Incumbent renominated	▌Buba Saleh Maina (APC); ▌Auroma Alhaji Mustapha (PDP)
Yunusari	Ahmed Dambol Musa	APC	Incumbent renominated	▌Ahmed Dambol Musa (APC); ▌Bulama Mohammed Fusami (PDP)
Yusufari	Mohammed Hassan	APC	Incumbent renominated	▌Mohammed Hassan (APC); ▌Haruna Kura (PDP)

== See also ==
- 2023 Nigerian elections
- 2023 Nigerian House of Assembly elections
