= Nse =

Nse may refer to:

== People ==
=== First name ===
- Nse Ekpenyong (1964–2022), Nigerian politician
- Nse Essien (born 1970), Nigerian politician and sports administrator manager
- Nse Ikpe-Etim (born 1974), Nigerian actress
- Nsé Ufot, activist

=== Middle name ===
- Imaobong Nse Uko (born 2004), Nigerian athlete
- Ramón Nse Esono Ebalé (born 1977), Equatorial Guinean illustrator

== Others ==
- NSE (disambiguation)
