= Eyakeno Etukudo =

Nigerian politician

Eyekeno Etukudo

Member of Akwa Ibom State House of Assembly
- In office 2011–2015
- Constituency: Ibesikpo Asutan

Personal details
- Party: Peoples Democratic Party
- Occupation: Politician

Eyakeno Etukudo is a Nigerian politician and member of the 5th Akwa Ibom State House of Assembly, representing Ibesikpo Asutan constituency. He is a member of the Peoples Democratic Party

== Background and early life ==
Eyekeno is from Asutan Ekpe, in Ibesikpo Asutan local government area, Akwa Ibom State.

== Political career ==
In 2011, Eyekeno was elected as a member representing ibesikpo Asutan in the Akwa Ibom State House of Assembly, was appointed chairman house Committee on Finance and Appropriation, Akwa Ibom State House of Assembly.
