= Muhammed Buba Jajere =

Nigerian politician

Federal Representative
- Constituency: Fika/Fune

Personal details
- Party: All Progressive Congress (Nigeria) (APC)
- Occupation: Politician

Muhammed Buba Jajere is a Nigerian politician. He is a member of the Federal House of Representatives, representing the Fika/Fune constituency of Yobe State in the 10th National Assembly of Nigeria. He also serves as the Deputy Chairman of the House of Representatives Committee on Sports.
