= NSSE =

NSSE may refer to:

- Network Security Systems Europe (United Kingdom)
- National Special Security Event (United States)
- National Survey of Student Engagement

== See also ==
- NSE (disambiguation)
