= Mohammed Sani Idriss =

Nigerian politician and academic

Commissioner for Basic and Secondary Education, Yobe State
- Incumbent
- Assumed office 2019
- Governor: Mai Mala Buni

Personal details
- Occupation: Academic, politician

Mohammed Sani Idriss is a Nigerian academic and politician from Yobe State, Nigeria. He is currently the Commissioner of Education of the Yobe State Ministry of Basic and Secondary Education after his appointment by Mai Mala Buni, the governor of Yobe State.
