= Eseme Eyiboh =

Nigerian politician

Eseme Eyiboh is a Nigerian politician. He served as a member of the Akwa Ibom State House of Assembly and represented the Eket Federal Constituency in the House of Representatives from 2007 to 2011. He is currently the Special Adviser on Media and Publicity to the Senate President of Nigeria, Godswill Akpabio.
