= General Hospital Damagum =

Public hospital in Yobe State, Nigeria

Coordinates: 11.6774°N 11.3345°E

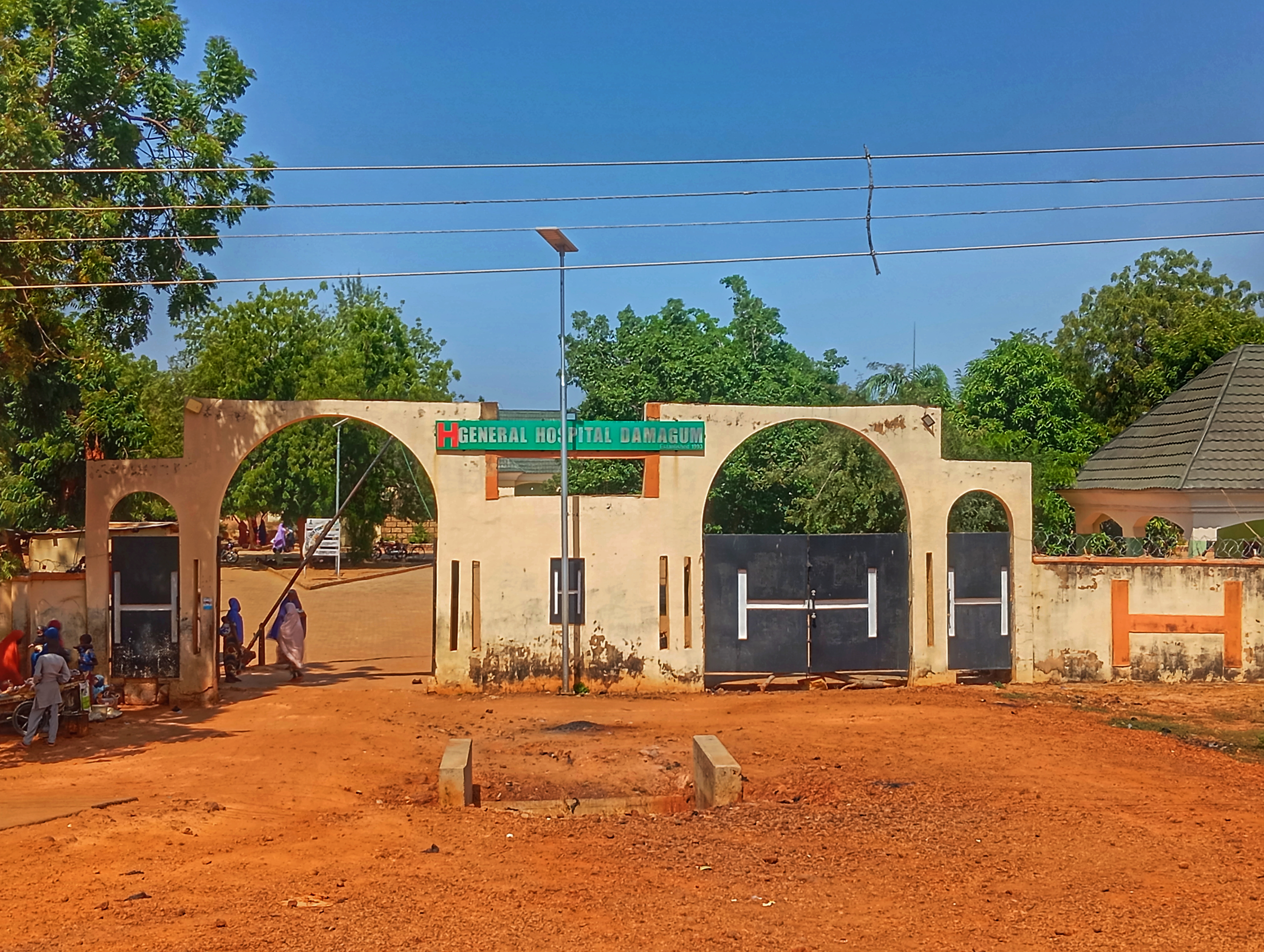

Geography
- Location: Damagum, South, Yobe State, Nigeria

History
- Opened: 1993

Links
- Lists: Hospitals in Nigeria

The Damagum General Hospital is a public hospital, located in Damagum, Fune Local Government Area, Yobe State, Nigeria. It was established in 1993, and operates on 24hours basis.

== Description ==
The Damagum General Hospital was licensed by the Federal Ministry of Health with facility code 35/14/1/2/1/0001 and registered as Secondary Health Care Centre.

== Departments ==
- Accident and Emergency Unit
- Maternity Unit
- General Out Patient Department
- Ante Natal Care (A.N.C)
- Female Ward
- Male Ward
