= Otobong =

Otobong is a given name and family name.

People with the name include:

- Edet Otobong (born 1986), Cameroonian footballer
- Otobong Bob (born 1992), Nigerian politician
- Otobong Nkanga (born 1974), Nigerian artist based in Belgium
