= Chiroma Mashio =

Nigerian politician (born 1968)

Speaker of the Yobe State House of Assembly
- Incumbent
- Assumed office 2023
- Constituency: Jajere

Personal details
- Born: 25 May 1968 (age 58) Mashio, Yobe State, Nigeria
- Education: B.Sc. Political Science
- Occupation: Politician

Chiroma Mashio is a Nigerian politician. He is the current Speaker of the Yobe State House of Assembly. He represents the Jajere Constituency and was elected unopposed as Speaker of the 8th Yobe State House of Assembly.

== Early life and education ==
Chiroma was born on May 25, 1968, in Mashio town, located in the Fune Local Government Area of Yobe State. He began his early education at Mashio Primary School before attending Government Secondary School in Damagum. In pursuit of further education, he attended Ramat Polytechnic in Maiduguri and later, the University of Maiduguri, where he earned a Bachelor of Science (B.Sc.) degree in Political Science.

== Political career ==
Chiroma political journey continued when he was elected as a Member of the Yobe State House of Assembly, representing Jajere Constituency in 1999. Over the years, he served in various committees and leadership roles within the legislative chamber. Notably, he was the Chairman of the House Committee on Finance and Appropriation during the 7th Assembly.

In the 8th Assembly, he was unanimously elected Speaker by his fellow lawmakers.
