= Moses Edet Essien =

Nigerian politician

Member of the Akwa Ibom State House of Assembly
- Incumbent
- Assumed office 2024
- Constituency: Ibiono Ibom

Personal details
- Party: Young Progressive Party
- Occupation: Politician

Moses Essien is a Nigerian politician and lawmaker. He represents Ibiono Ibom State Constituency in the Akwa Ibom State House of Assembly under the platform of the Young Progressive Party (YPP).
