= Yobe state road traffic management agency =

Nigerian traffic agency

- Abbreviation: YOROTA
- Formation: 2019
- Legal status: Active
- Purpose: Road traffic control
- Headquarters: Damaturu potiskum road
- Location: Yobe State
- Region served: Damaturu
- Official language: English
- Managing Director: Alh. Modu Bature Goneri
- Staff: 2000
- Volunteers: 100
- Website: https://yorotareg.com/redirect.html

Yobe state road traffic management agency (YOROTA) is a government agency responsible for traffic management and control, road safety, and other related matters within Yobe State. The agency was established in 2019 with the mandate of ensuring safety on the roads, reducing accidents, and ensuring the free flow of traffic. YOROTA operates in collaboration with other law enforcement agencies such as the Nigeria Police Force and the Federal Road Safety Corps (FRSC) to maintain law and order on the roads.

== History ==
Yobe state road traffic management agency YOROTA was established Governor Mai Mala Buni to ensure appropriate traffic in the state.

== Responsibilities ==
Some of the specific responsibilities of YOROTA include:

- Ensuring compliance with traffic rules and regulations
- Issuing and renewing driver's licenses and vehicle registration
- Conducting road safety campaigns and awareness programs
- Managing traffic flow and congestion on the roads
- Providing towing services for broken-down or abandoned vehicles
- Enforcing traffic rules and regulations through the use of mobile courts.
