= Uduak Ekpo-Ufot =

Nigerian politician

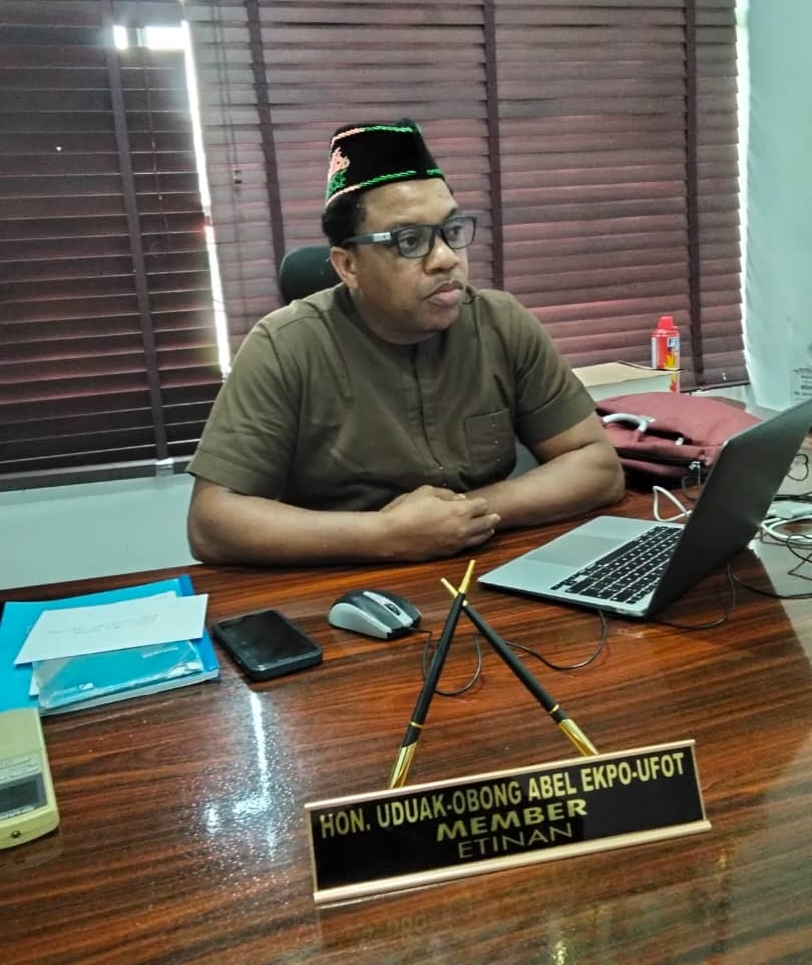

State Representative
- Constituency: Etinan

Personal details
- Party: Peoples Democratic Party (Nigeria) (PDP)
- Occupation: Politician

Uduak Ekpo-Ufot is a Nigerian politician and currently a member of parliament representing Etinan State Constituency in Akwa Ibom State House of Assembly. He is a member of the Peoples Democratic Party.

== Background and early life ==
Uduak is from Etinan local government area, Akwa Ibom state.
