= 2019 Yobe State House of Assembly election =

The 2019 Yobe State House of Assembly election was held on 9 March 2019, to elect members of the Yobe State House of Assembly in Nigeria. All the 24 seats were up for election in the Yobe State House of Assembly.

Ahmed Lawan Mirwa from APC representing Nguru II constituency was elected Speaker, while Auwal Isa Bello Danchuwa from APC representing Mamudo constituency was elected Deputy Speaker.

== Results ==
The result of the election is listed below.

- Ahmed Lawan Mirwa from APC won Nguru II constituency
- Auwal Isa Bello Danchuwa from APC won Mamudo constituency
- Mohammad Lamido from APC won Tarmuwa constituency
- Gafu Mai Zabu from APC won Bade West constituency
- Mohammad Bazani from APC won Damaturu I constituency
- Ishaku Sani Audu from APC won Goya/Ngegi constituency
- Chiroma A. Buba from APC won Fune I constituency
- Mohammad Ali from APC won Gaidam South constituency
- Bunu Zanna from APC won Gulani constituency
- 18 Adamu Dafa Dogo from APC won Karasuwa constituency
- Abdullahi Adamu Bazuwa from APC won Potiskum constituency
- Hassan Mohammad from APC won Yusufari constituency
- Yakubu Suleiman from APC won Fika/Ngalda constituency
- Mala Lawan Jawa from APC won Busari constituency
- Buba Ibrahim from APC won Damaturu II constituency
- Digima Gana from APC won Damagun constituency
- Bukar Mustapha from APC won Gaidam North constituency
- Lawan Sani Inuwa from PDP won Nguru I constituency
- Bulama Bukar from APC won Gujba constituency
- Ya'u Usman Dachia from APC won Jakusko constituency
- Saminu Musa Lawan from APC won Nangere constituency
- Ahmed Musa Dumbol from APC won Yunusari constituency
- Ahmed Musa Dumbol from APC won Yunusari constituency
- Mohammad Kabir Mai Malo from APC won Bade East constituency
