= Idi Barde Gubana =

Nigerian politician, born in 1960

His Excellency Idi Barde Gubana
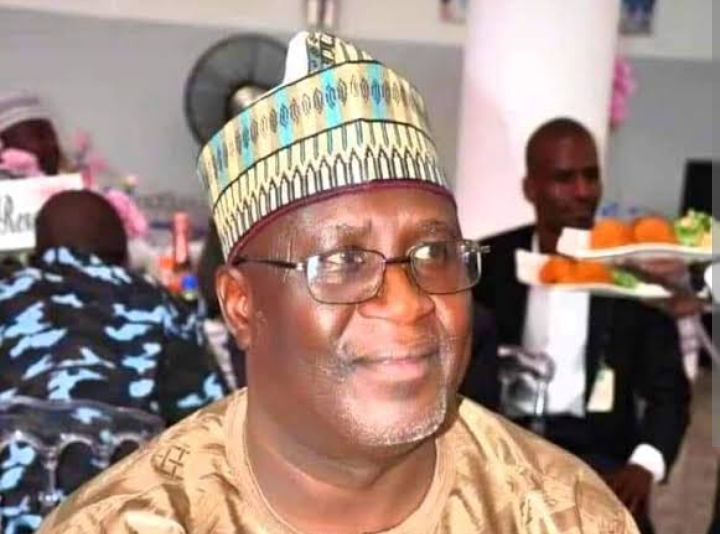
- Portrait of Idi Barde Gubana

Deputy Governor of Yobe State
- Incumbent
- Assumed office 29 May 2019
- Governor: Mai Mala Buni (since 2019)
- Preceded by: Abubakar D. Aliyu

Personal details
- Born: Idi Barde Gubana; 24 April 1960 (age 66) Gubana, Fune, Northern Region (now in Yobe State), Nigeria
- Party: All Progressive Congress
- Occupation: Politician

Alhaji Idi Barde Gubana (born 24 April 1960) is a Nigerian Karai-Karai politician, and the current deputy governor of Yobe state under governor Mai Mala Buni. He is a member of the ruling All Progressives Congress (APC) party and was elected in 2019. He was born in the Karai-Karai village of Gubana in Fune Local Government. He holds the traditional title of Waziri (Vizier) of Fune Emirate.

== Education background ==
He attended Daura primary school in 1967 where he obtained the First School Leaving Certificate in 1973, and secondary school at Borno teachers college from 1973 to 1979 where he obtained the West African Examinations Council. He went to school of social conversation Jos in 1989 for HND qualification. After that he went to university of Borno state (UNIMAID) and did his PGD in business administration after that he went to Borno State University and obtained masters qualification in 2000.

== Career ==
He worked as a class teacher in 1980 in Dawayya primary school and as head master in Gubana primary school from 1982 to 1984. In 1982 he worked in the Agriculture department in Fune local government of Yobe State. He held HOD rank in Agriculture department at Fika local government secretariat.

== Families and religion ==
Barde held from the Fune Emirate to an eastern clan of the Karai-Karai ethnic group. He is married to 3 wives and has 29 children. He holds the traditional title of Wazirin Fune. He is a Muslim.

== Politics ==
Idi Barde started his political journey in 1997 when he contested and won as executive chairman of Fune local government sit under the platform of United Nigeria Congress Party (UNCP), to represent Fune local government council. In 2000 he was appointed chairman caretaker committee in Fune local government two times to 2003. He became special assistance in special duties to the executive governor of Yobe state H.E Bukar Abba Ibrahim in 2007, after that he was appoint as a commissioner ministry of integrity and rural development. In 2008 he became special assistant at national assemble to distinguish Bukar Abba Ibrahim, and at the same time he was assistant national treasure northeast under All Nigeria Peoples Party (ANPP). In 2011 he was appointed as a commissioner ministry of agriculture of Yobe state. He was appointed again as commissioner ministry of environmental 2013, commissioner ministry of budget 2013, and deputy governor of Yobe state from 2019 until now.

=== Other political appointments ===
Before his nomination as the deputy Governor, Barde held different political appointments in various ministries. He was once a Commissioner of Agriculture, Commissioner of Environment and Commissioner of Budget and planning.
