= Dufuna canoe =

Second-oldest canoe in the world

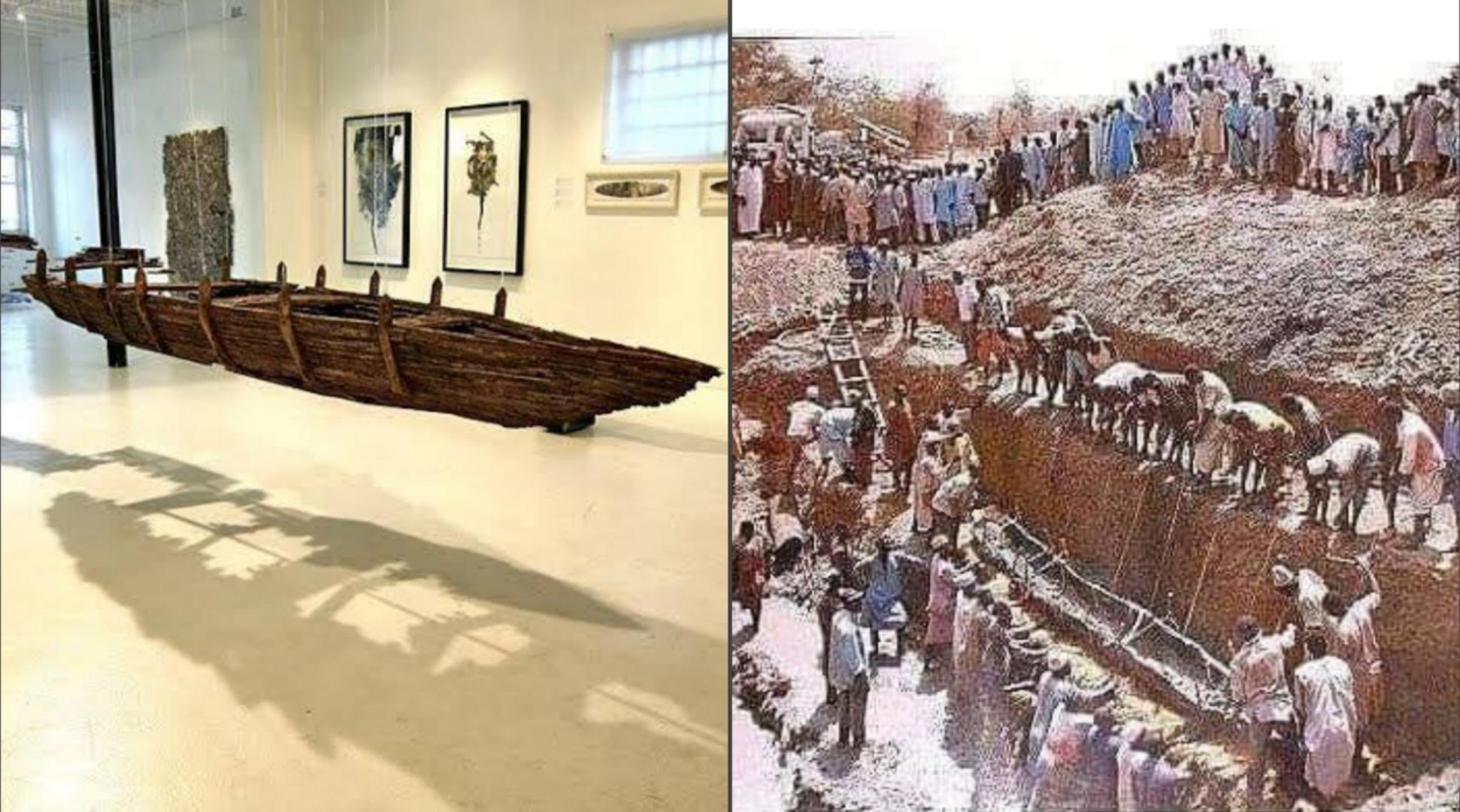
- Dufuna canoe
- Type: Dugout canoe
- Material: African mahogany
- Size: Length: 8.4 metres (28 ft); Width: 50 centimetres (20 in)
- Created: c. 6250 BC
- Discovered: 4 May 1987; Dufuna, Yobe, Nigeria
- Discovered by: Mallam Ya'u
- Present location: Damaturu, Yobe, Nigeria

The Dufuna canoe is the world's second-oldest known boat. It is a dugout canoe discovered in 1987 by a Fulani herdsman a few kilometres from the village of Dufuna in the Fune Local Government Area, not far from the Komadugu Gana River, in Yobe State, Nigeria. Radiocarbon dating of a sample of charcoal found near the site dates the canoe at 8,500 to 8,000 years old, linking the site to Lake Chad. The canoe is 8.4 metres (28 ft) long and is 0.5 metres (1 ft 8 in) tall at it largest point. It is currently located in Damaturu, Nigeria.

== Background ==
The Dufuna canoe was found in the village of Dufuna, which is located between Potiskum and Gashua, in Yobe State. On 4 May 1987, Mallam Ya'u, a Fulani cow herdsman, was digging a well and hit a hard object at 4.5 metres (15 ft). He informed his village chief about the discovery.

In 1989 and 1990, the University of Maiduguri carried out an initial exploration of the site to ascertain whether it was a canoe and to take radiocarbon dating samples of the wood. Later, a joint research project by Professors Peter Breunig and Garba Abubakar and funded by the University of Frankfurt and the University of Maiduguri would return to the site; further wood samples were taken and dated by two German laboratories.

In 1994, an archaeology team from Germany and Nigeria excavated the site. The canoe was dug out over two weeks by fifty labourers and was found to be 8.4 metres (28 ft) in length, 50 centimetres (20 in) wide and 5 cm thick. The canoe was found in a waterlogged state resting on a sandy bed with layers of clay between it and the surface protecting it in an oxygen-free environment. Examination of the canoe showed that the bow and stern had been skilfully worked to points, and that the work was carried out by "core axe-like and pick-axe bifacial tools of micro-lithic appearance". Professor Breunig said that the skill of construction showed a long development and that the canoe was not a new design. In another study by an American science team in 2015, they found that Lake Chad had shrunk by 95% in forty years and therefore it could be assumed that area of the village of Dufuna would have been part of the lake's flood plain in the distant past.

The canoe has been radiocarbon-dated at least twice, and was dated to 6556-6388 BCE and to 6164-6005 BCE, making it the oldest known boat in Africa and (after the Pesse canoe) the second-oldest worldwide. It was probably created in a longstanding boat-making tradition and used in fishing along the Komadugu Gana River. It may have been constructed by members of a population group who occupied an area extending from the western Sahara to the Nile of central Sudan and to northern Kenya.

== See also ==
- Traditional fishing boats
- List of oldest ships
- List of surviving ancient ships
