= Mirwa Ahmed Lawan =

Nigerian politician

Speaker of the Yobe State House of Assembly
- In office 2003–2023
- Constituency: Nguru II Constituency

Personal details
- Born: Yobe State, Nigeria
- Party: All Nigeria Peoples Party (ANPP)
- Occupation: Politician

Mirwa Ahmed Lawan is a Nigerian politician who served as the Speaker of the Yobe State House of Assembly, representing the Nguru II Constituency. He had been a member of the House since 2003, having first been elected under the All Nigeria Peoples Party (ANPP). He was succeeded by Musa Lawan Majakura in 2023.
