= Aniefiok Dennis =

Nigerian politician

Member of Akwa Ibom State House of Assembly
- In office June 2015 – June 2023 (re-run)
- Constituency: Etinan

Special Adviser on Legislative Matters to Godswill Akpabio
- In office 2003–2007

Senior Special Assistant on Legal Matters to Godswill Akpabio
- In office 2013–2014

Personal details
- Party: Peoples Democratic Party
- Occupation: Politician, Lawyer

Aniefiok Dennis is a Nigerian Lawyer and politician. He was a member representing Etinan State constituency in the 6th & 7th Akwa Ibom State House of Assembly. He is a member of the Peoples Democratic Party.

== Political career ==
Aniefiok Dennis' journey into public service began in 2000 when he served as the Legal Adviser to Etinan Local Government Council, a role he held until 2002. In 2001, he coordinated the Etinan Local Government Area's Constitution Review Committee during the review of Nigeria's 1999 Constitution.

He served as the Special Adviser on Legislative Matters to Hon. Enobong Eshiet, a former member of the Akwa Ibom State House of Assembly, from 2003 to 2007.

In 2007, he was appointed Special Assistant on Legal Matters to Governor Godswill Akpabio, and was promoted in 2013 to the position of the Senior Special Assistant on Legal Matters, a post he held until 2014.

Dennis was elected to represent the Etinan State Constituency in the Akwa Ibom State House of Assembly in 2015. He was appointed as the Deputy Leader of the House during his first term in the 6th Akwa Ibom State House of Assembly. He also served as the Chairman of the House Committee on Information.

He has sponsored significant bills, including:

- A Bill for a Law to Establish Akwa Ibom State College of Health Technology.
- A Bill to Eliminate Violence in Private and Public Life and Provide Remedies for Victims, a bill advocating punishment for individuals proven guilty of rape and other violent crimes in Akwa Ibom state.
- The Akwa Ibom State Administration of Criminal Justice Bill.

His motions address critical issues such as public health, infrastructural decay, and gender-based violence. Notable examples include motions on COVID-19 preventive measures, vaccination advocacy, and the urgent reconstruction of collapsed infrastructure.

== Community Development ==
Dennis has been supporting his community by facilitating numerous development projects. These include the renovation of schools, provision of classroom furniture, establishment of water supply systems, and the donation of essential equipment to support small-scale businesses. His contributions to education are particularly notable, with scholarships for law students, provision of computers to schools, and financial assistance to students in various disciplines.
