= Komadugu Gana River =

River in northeastern Nigeria

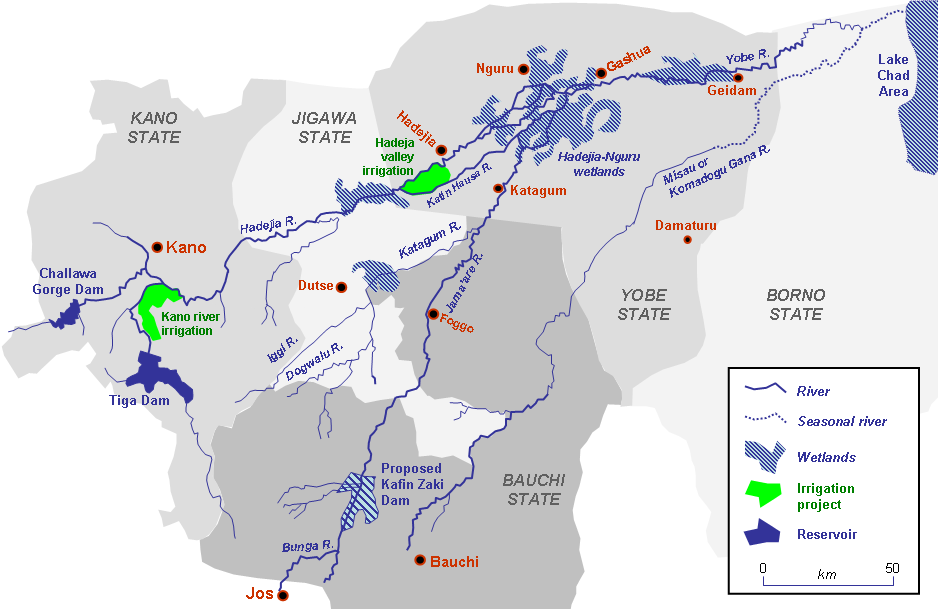
Catchment area of the Yobe River

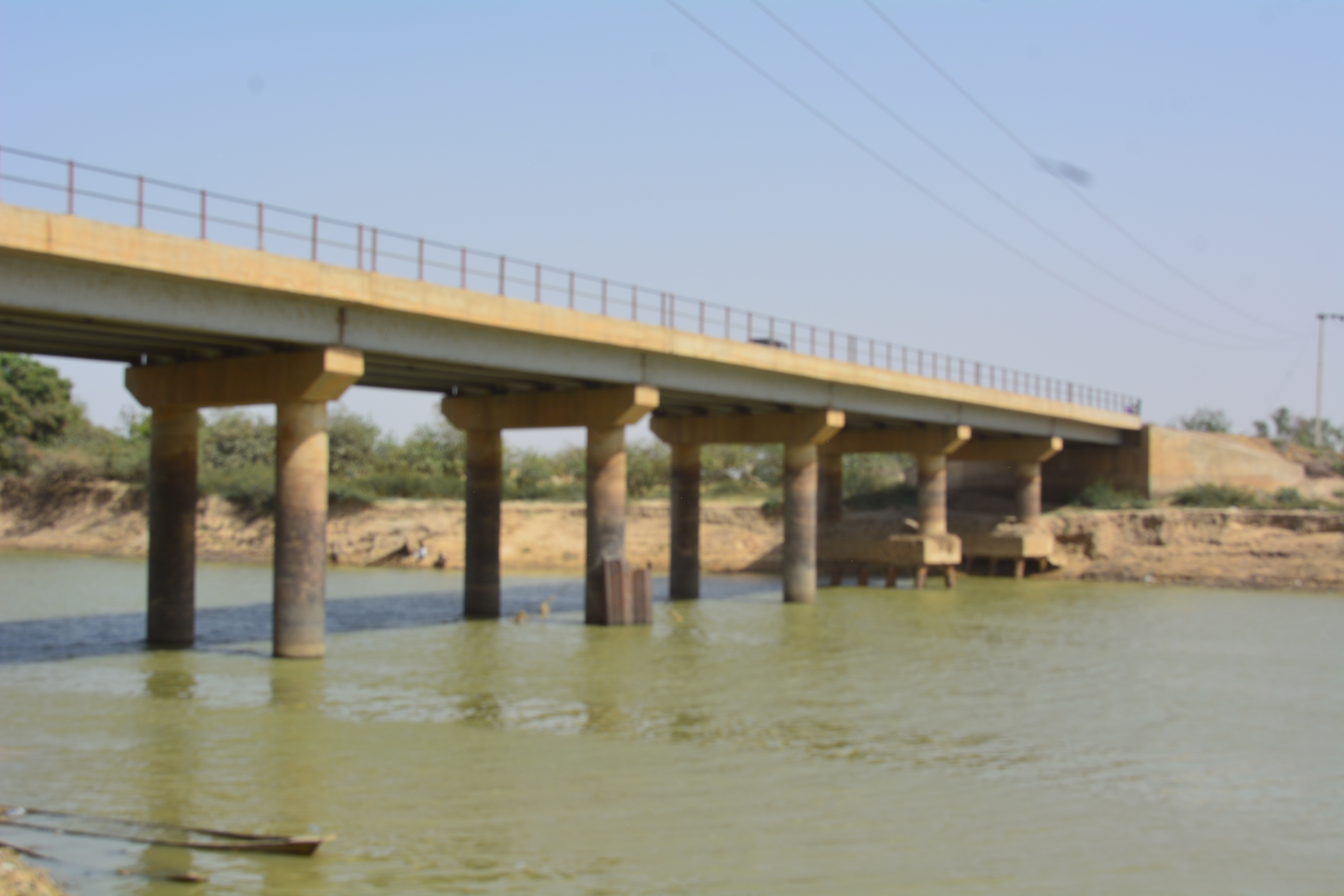

The Komadugu Gana River or Misau River is a river in the Chad Basin in northeastern Nigeria that joins the Yobe River at Damasak, in the Mobbar Local Government Area of Borno State. It rises north of Bauchi.

According to a 2011 report by the International Union for Conservation of Nature, the water flow of the river no longer reaches the Yobe.

The 8,500-year-old Dufuna canoe was discovered during a dig near the river in 1987 in the Fune Local Government Area.
