= Musa Lawan =

Nigerian politician and chieftain (1943/1944–2023)

Member of the House of Representatives of Nigeria
- In office 2019–2023
- Constituency: Biu/Bayo/Shani/Kwaya Kusar Federal Constituency

Personal details
- Party: All Progressives Congress (APC)
- Occupation: Politician

Alhaji Musa Lawan (1943/1944 – 18 August 2023) was a Nigerian politician and elder statesman who held the Matawalle of Fika and Madakin Tikau, chieftaincy titles. He was a chieftain and founding member of the ruling All Progressives Congress (APC) in Yobe State. He died at the age of 79 after a brief illness in Kano.

== Early life and education ==
Musa Lawan was born in Borno State, Nigeria.

== Political career ==
Musa Lawan is a Nigerian politician who represented the Biu/Bayo/Shani/Kwaya Kusar Federal Constituency of Borno State in the House of Representatives of Nigeria. He was elected during the 2019 general election on the platform of the All Progressives Congress (APC).

== Death ==
Lawan died in Kano on 18 August 2023, at the age of 79. He was buried on 19 August, after a funeral prayer at his residence in Potiskum, which was attended by Yobe State governor, Mai Mala Buni.
