= Musa Lawan Majakura =

Nigerian teacher and politician

- Born: Yobe state
- Citizenship: Nigeria
- Education: Atiku Abubakar College
- Occupations: Teacher, fisherman, politician

Musa Lawan Majakura is a Nigerian fisherman, teacher, and politician who is the member-elect of Yobe state house of assembly. He is from Majakura village in Nguru local government area of Yobe state. In the 2023 Yobe State House of Assembly election, he was elected into the state house of assembly as a member representing Nguru II constituency of Yobe state.

== Early life and education ==
Majakura was born into a family of businessmen in the remote village of Majakura Nguru local government area of Yobe State. He dedicated his early life to educating children in the village free of charge, noting that their constituency suffered neglect in terms of education. Majakura had his primary and secondary education both in the Nguru local government area of Yobe State. After completing his secondary education he went to Atiku Abubakar College for Legal and Islamic Studies, Nguru, for his National Diploma (ND), and later proceeded to Federal Polytechnic Damaturu, Yobe State, where he gained a Higher National Diploma.

== Entry into politics ==
In 2021, Majakura contested for the councillorship ticket for Majakura Ward on the platform of the All Progressives Congress (APC) but lost. In 2022, he defected to the Peoples Democratic Party (PDP) and eyed the seat of Nguru constituency II in the 2023 state assembly elections and scored 6,648 votes to defeat Lawan of the All Progressives Congress (APC) who got 6,466 votes as announced by the Returning Officer of the election, Habib Muhammad.ed to the Peoples Democratic Party (PDP) and eyed the seat of Nguru constituency II in the 2023 state assembly elections and scored 6,648 votes to defeat Lawan of the All Progressives Congress (APC) who got 6,466 votes as announced by the Returning Officer of the election, Habib Muhammad.

== Political controversy ==
Majakura was arrested and detained by security personnel three times for criticising the Yobe state house of assembly speaker on Facebook. However, after he regained his freedom, Majakura residents asked Musa to challenge the speaker at the polls. He duly secured PDP's ticket.
