= Nse Essien =

Nigerian politician

- Born: March 23, 1970 (age 56); Akwa Ibom, Nigeria
- Education: University of Uyo, Army School, Calabar
- Occupation: Politician
- Known for: Politics
- Spouse: Ndifreke Nse Essien

Nse Essien (born March 23, 1970) is a Nigerian politician and sports administrator. Essian is a member of the Akwa Ibom State House of Assembly and is currently serving as the Deputy Chief Whip. Essian graduated from the University of Calabar in 1984, obtaining a degree in Geology, and later joined the University of Uyo.

Essien also owns FC One Rocket and Carabana Football Academy.

== Early life and education ==
Nse Essien was born on 23 March 1970 in Akwa Ibom State, Nigeria.

== Career ==
Essien was re-elected to the Akwa Ibom State House of Assembly in the 2019 general elections to represent the Onna State Constituency. Essien also served as the deputy chief whip, and a House Committee Chairman on Security, Youth and Sports.

In 2022, Essien was appointed a Patron of the Nigeria Football Academies Championship.

== Philanthropy ==
Essian established the Carabana Football Academy, which aims to nurture young football players. He has also paid the bails of over 189 inmates incarcerated in the Nigerian Correctional Service. In 2023, Essian fulfilled a $3,000 pledge to the Flying Eagles following their win over Argentina.

== Recognition ==
In 2023, the Russian football club FDC Vista recognized him for his contributions to sports and youth development in Nigeria. He was awarded Sports Icon of the Year alongside Kunle Soname.
