= Aniekan Uko =

Nigerian politician

Special adviser to Governor Umo Eno on Legislative Affairs
- Incumbent
- In office June 2023 – June 2027
- Constituency: Ibesikpo Asutan

Speaker of Akwa Ibom State House of Assembly
- In office June 2015 – December 2015

Member of Akwa Ibom State House of Assembly
- In office 2015–2019

Personal details
- Party: Peoples Democratic Party
- Occupation: Politician

Aniekan Uko is a Nigerian Politician and member of the 7th Akwa Ibom State House of Assembly, representing Ibesikpo Asutan State Constituency. He is a member of the Peoples Democratic Party. He is also known as Iboroakam.

== Background and early life ==
Aniekan is from Mbikpong Ikot Edim in Ibesikpo Asutan Local Government Area, Akwa Ibom state.

== Political career ==
Aniekan Uko served as the Speaker of the Akwa Ibom State House of Assembly from June 2015 until December 2015. He was elected Speaker during the inauguration of the 6th Assembly in June 2015.

His tenure was cut short in December 2015 when the Court of Appeal nullified his election, leading to his removal from the position. Onofiok Luke was elected as the new Speaker of the Akwa Ibom State House of Assembly .

In 2019, he was a member of the committee on welfare and selection, and in the same year, he co-sponsored a Bill: A Law to Eliminate Violence in Private and Public Life, Prohibit all forms of Violence Against Persons and to Provide Maximum Protection and Effective Remedies for Victims and Punishment of Offenders and for Related Matters, a bill advocating punishment for individuals proven guilty of rape and other violent crimes in Akwa Ibom state.

He currently serves as the honorary special adviser to Governor, Umo Eno on Legislative affairs.

== Philanthropy and Community Development ==
Aniekan is known for supporting his constituents through education, business aid, and community development. His efforts have improved the lives of many in Ibesikpo Asutan and set a standard for meaningful representation.

== Recognition/Award ==
Aniekan Uko has been honored for his work as a lawmaker. He was named the Best State Lawmaker in Nigeria for his efforts in creating bills, supporting his constituency, and empowering people by the Parliamentary Staff Association of Nigeria (PASAN) in collaboration with Papyrus Magazine. He also received the award for being the Best in Parliamentary Practice in Nigeria, recognizing his skills and dedication to legislative work.
