= Felicia Bassey =

Nigerian politician

Deputy Speaker of the Akwa Ibom State House of Assembly
- Constituency: Okobo State Constituency

Personal details
- Born: Akwa Ibom State, Nigeria
- Occupation: Politician

Felicia Bassey is a Nigerian politician. She served as a member of the Akwa Ibom State House of Assembly, representing the Okobo State Constituency. She also held the position of Deputy Speaker of the Akwa Ibom State House of Assembly.
