= Otobong Bob =

Nigerian politician

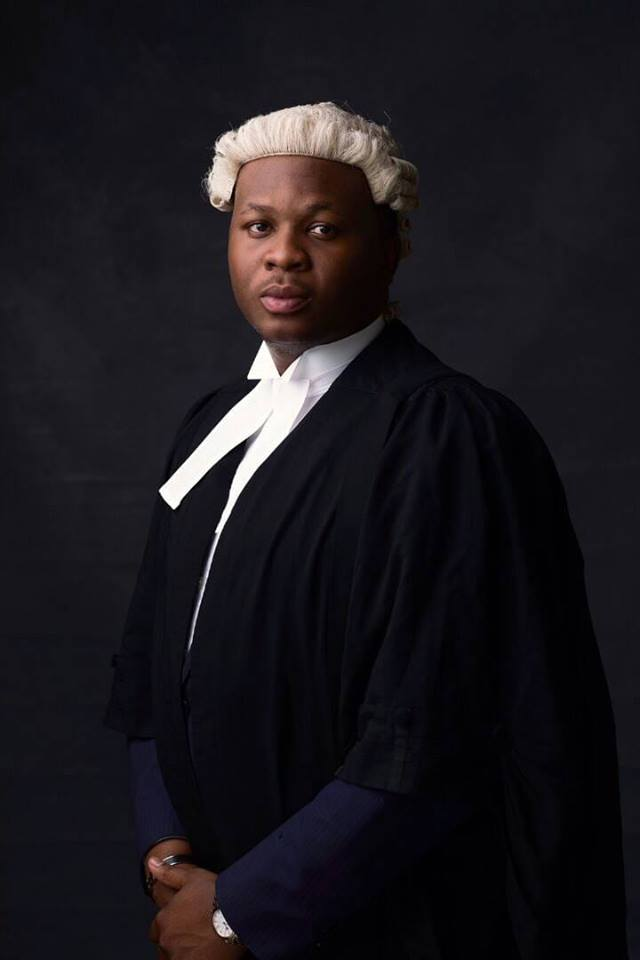
Barr Otobong Bob

Barr Otobong Bob is a Nigerian lawyer and politician from Nsit-Ubium in Akwa Ibom State of Nigeria. He is the member representing Nsit-Ubium State Constituency in the Akwa Ibom State House of Assembly and is the youngest Law Maker in Nigeria

== Birth ==
He was born on 18 August 1992 into the family of Senator Effiong Dickson Bob who is a Nigerian Senator, as well as the prochancellor and chairman of the governing council of the University of Benin

== Education ==
He started his primary education at Mobil Pegasus Primary School, Eket in Akwa Ibom State in 1997.

In 2003, he enrolled into Jephthah Secondary School, Port Harcourt in 2003 but later moved over to Greensprings School, Lagos where he completed his secondary education. He proceeded to Brooke House College, United Kingdom in 2008 and passed out in 2010 with Advanced Level Certificate.

In 2011, he was admitted into the University of Buckingham, United Kingdom for a six months preliminary legal studies. In July that same year he registered at the Faculty of Law of the University of Buckingham and graduated with the Bachelor of Laws Honours degree in the Second Class Upper Division.

In July 2013, he was at the Nigerian Law School and on graduation with the B. L., he was later called to the Nigerian Bar Association.

He returned to the United Kingdom for a Master's Degree in Law, this time at the University of Warwick.

In 2008, he was with Alex Izinyon, SAN and CO to sharpen his knowledge of the law as applicable in Nigeria. In June 2014, he was with Obla SAN and CO where he studied legal drafting, legal research and more. Again, in September 2014, he perfected the art of legal drafting at Alex Izinyon, SAN and CO.

In 2015, he did the Joint Columbia Law School and Chartered Institute of Arbitrators course in international arbitration. Earlier, he had been adjudged to have performed the best in Electronic Business Law in the University of Buckingham.

== Work ==
Otobong Effiong Bob, Esq returned to Nigeria to practice law having completed the mandatory one-year National Youth Service Corps programme.

On 5 October 2018, Otobong Effiong Bob, Esq was nominated by the PDP in Nsit Ubium to fly the flag of the party in the election into the Akwa Ibom State House of Assembly to represent Nsit Ubium State Constituency. He polled 127 votes out of a total of 128 accredited delegates.

Otobong Effiong Bob, Esq embarked on a vigorous and elaborate campaign that took him to all the 88 political units in Nsit Ubium.

On 9 March 2019 that intensive campaign paid off as Otobong Effiong Bob, Esq was elected by the people of Nsit Ubium to represent them in the 7th Akwa Ibom State House of Assembly.

On 28 March 2019, the youngest elected member of the Akwa Ibom State House of Assembly, Otobong Effiong Bob, Esq was presented with the Certificate of Return by the State Resident Electoral Commissioner.

Hon Otobong Effiong Bob, Esq was inaugurated as a member of the 7th Akwa Ibom State House of Assembly on Monday 10 June 2019 setting the stage for the people of Nsit Ubium State Constituency to get quality, effective and efficient representation.

Hon Otobong Effiong Bob is the Chairman of the House Committee on Rules, Business, Ethics and Privileges as well as membership of many other House committees.
