= Yobe State House of Assembly =

Coordinates: 11°44′41″N 11°59′40″E

Type
- Type: Unicameral

History
- Founded: 27 August 1991

Leadership
- Speaker: The Right Honourable Chiroma Buba Mashio
- Deputy Speaker: The Honourable Ya'u Usman Dachia
- Majority Leader: The Honourable Nasiru Hassan Yusuf
- Minority Leader: The Honourable Sadiq Yahaya

Meeting place
- Yobe State House of Assembly Complex, Yobe

Yobe State House of Assembly is the legislative arm of the Yobe State Government. It is a unicameral body consisting of 24 members elected into 24 state constituencies and presided by a Speaker.The assembly is responsible for enacting laws, Providing Budgets and Overseeing the activities of the State Government under the 1999 Nigerian Constitution. The current Speaker of the house is Hon. Chiroma Buba Mashio. The age of voting is 18.

== Members ==
Yobe State House of Assembly consists of 24 elected representatives from each constituency since the 2023 Yobe State House of Assembly electionobe state house of assembly election]].

Constituency	Representative
Bade west	Muhammad maimato kabir
Bade east	Sanda kyari Bade
Bursari	Jawa Mala Lawan
Damagum	Maina Digma Gana
Damaturu I	Bazam Muhammad
Damaturu II	Buba Ibrahim kalallawa
Fika/Ngalda	Yakubu suleiman maluri
Geidam North	Bukar Musatpha
Geidam South	Muhammad Ali
Goya/Ngeji	Ishaku Sani Audu
Gujba	Bulama Bukar
Gulani	Bularafa Bunu Zanna
Jajere	Rt. Hon. chiroma Buba Mashio (speaker)
Jakusko	Hon. Ya'u Usman Dachia (Deputy speaker)
karasuwa	Ahmad Dala-dogo
Mamudo	Muhammad Isa Bello
Nangere constituency	Saminu musa Lawan
Nguru I	Lawan Sani inuwa
Nguru II	Ahmad lawan mirwa
Potiskum	Abdullahi Adamu Bazuwa
Tarmuwa	Buba Saleh Maina
Yunusari	Ahmad Dambol Musa
Yusufari	Muhammad Hassan
