= Usoro Akpanusoh =

Nigerian politician

Usoro Akpanusoh is a Nigerian politician. He served as a member representing the people of Esit Eket/Ibeno State Constituency in the 6th Akwa Ibom State House of Assembly.
