= 2023 Nigerian state legislative elections =

2023 Nigerian state legislative elections may refer to:

- 2023 Abia State House of Assembly election
- 2023 Kano State House of Assembly election
- 2023 Adamawa State House of Assembly election
- 2023 Akwa Ibom State House of Assembly election
- 2023 Yobe State House of Assembly election

== See also ==
[[Category: 2023 elections in Nigeria]]
