= Kufreabasi Edidem =

Nigerian politician

Deputy Speaker of the Akwa Ibom State House of Assembly
- Incumbent
- Assumed office 9 June 2023
- Constituency: Itu

Personal details
- Party: People's Democratic Party (PDP)
- Occupation: Politician

Kufreabasi Edidem is a Nigerian politician and the Deputy Speaker of the 8th Akwa Ibom State House of Assembly representing Itu state constituency under the platform of Peoples Democratic Party.

== Political career ==
Edidem has represented the Itu State Constituency in the Akwa Ibom State House of Assembly. He was first elected in the 2019 election and was re-elected in 2023 on the platform of the People's Democratic Party (PDP). On 9 June 2023, Edidem was elected Deputy Speaker of the 8th Akwa Ibom State House of Assembly. Before becoming Deputy Speaker, he served as Chairman of the House Committee on Commerce, Culture and Tourism. He had also served as Chairman of Itu Local Government Council.
