= Udeme Otong =

Nigerian politician

Udeme Otong is a Nigerian politician and the speaker of the 8th Akwa Ibom State House of Assembly under Peoples Democratic Party representing Abak State constituency. Hails from Abak Itenge, Abak Local Government Area
