= 2019 Nigerian House of Representatives elections in Yobe State =

The 2019 Nigerian House of Representatives elections in Yobe State was held on February 23, 2019, to elect members of the House of Representatives to represent Yobe State, Nigeria.

== Overview ==
Affiliation	Party		Total
Affiliation	APC	PDP	Total
Before Election	5	1	6
After Election	6	0	6

== Summary ==
District	Incumbent	Party	Elected Rep	Party
Bade/Jakusko	Zakariya'u Galadima	APC	Zakariya'u Galadima	APC
Bursari/Geidam/Yunusari	Goni Bukar Lawan	APC	Lawan Shettima Ali	APC
Damaturu/Gujba/Gulani/Tarmuwa	Khadija Bukar Abba Ibrahim	APC	Khadija Bukar Abba Ibrahim	APC
Fika/Fune	Ismaila Ahmad Gadaka	APC	Abubakar Yerima	APC
Machina/Nguru/Yusufari/Karasuwa	Sidi Yakubu	APC	Tijjani Zannah Zakariya	APC
Nangere/Potiskum	Sabo Garba	PDP	Ibrahim-Umar Potiskum	APC

== Results ==
=== Bade/Jakusko ===
A total of 12 candidates registered with the Independent National Electoral Commission to contest in the election. APC candidate Zakariya'u Galadima won the election, defeating PDP Hassan Kaikaku and 10 other party candidates. Galadima received 62.39% of the votes, while Kaikaku received 36.63%.

2019 Nigerian House of Representatives election in Yobe State
Party	Candidate	Votes	%
APC	Zakariya'u Galadima	53,066	62.39%
PDP	Hassan Kaikaku	31,155	36.63%
Others		838	0.99%
Total votes		85,059	100%
APC hold			

=== Bursari/Geidam/Yunusari ===
A total of 2 candidates registered with the Independent National Electoral Commission to contest in the election. APC candidate Lawan Shettima Ali won the election, defeating PDP Hassan Abba. Ali received 88.49% of the votes, while Abba received 11.51%.

2019 Nigerian House of Representatives election in Yobe State
Party	Candidate	Votes	%
APC	Lawan Shettima Ali	59,823	88.49%
PDP	Hassan Abba	7,784	11.51%
Others			
Total votes		67,607	100%
APC hold			

=== Damaturu/Gujba/Gulani/Tarmuwa ===
A total of 2 candidates registered with the Independent National Electoral Commission to contest in the election. APC candidate Khadija Bukar Abba Ibrahim won the election, defeating PDP Habu Babayo. Ibrahim received 88.25% of the votes, while Babayo received 11.75%.

2019 Nigerian House of Representatives election in Yobe State
Party	Candidate	Votes	%
APC	Khadija Bukar Abba Ibrahim	78,953	88.25%
PDP	Habu Babayo	10,508	11.75%
Others			
Total votes		89,461	100%
APC hold			

=== Fika/Fune ===
A total of 3 candidates registered with the Independent National Electoral Commission to contest in the election. APC candidate Abubakar Yerima won the election, defeating PDP Zainab Boni Haruna and 1 other candidate. Yerima received 64.29% of the votes, while Boni Haruna received 35.40%.

2019 Nigerian House of Representatives election in Yobe State
Party	Candidate	Votes	%
APC	Abubakar Yerima	64,207	64.29%
PDP	Zainab Boni Haruna	35,352	35.40%
Others		309	0.31%
Total votes		99,868	100%
APC hold			

=== Machina/Nguru/Yusufari/Karasuwa ===
A total of 2 candidates registered with the Independent National Electoral Commission to contest in the election. APC candidate Tijjani Zannah Zakariya won the election, defeating PDP Ali Garba. Zakariya received 76.08% of the votes, while Garba received 23.92%.

2019 Nigerian House of Representatives election in Yobe State
Party	Candidate	Votes	%
APC	Tijjani Zannah Zakariya	86,358	76.08%
PDP	Ali Garba	27,145	23.92%
Others			
Total votes		113,503	100%
APC hold			

=== Nangere/Potiskum ===
A total of 4 candidates registered with the Independent National Electoral Commission to contest in the election. APC candidate Ibrahim-Umar Potiskum won the election, defeating PDP Sabo Garba and 2 other party candidates. Potiskum received 57.29% of the votes, while Garba received 36.87%.

2019 Nigerian House of Representatives election in Yobe State
Party	Candidate	Votes	%
APC	Ibrahim-Umar Potiskum	61,874	57.29%
PDP	Sabo Garba	39,817	36.87%
Others		6,316	5.85%
Total votes		108,007	100%
APC hold			
