= NSE =

NSE may refer to:

== Stock exchanges ==
- Nagoya Stock Exchange, Japan
- Nairobi Stock Exchange, Kenya
- Nigerian Stock Exchange, Lagos
- National Stock Exchange of India (NSE), Mumbai, India
- National Stock Exchange, the former name of Vilnius Stock Exchange, Lithuania

== Transportation ==
- Network SouthEast, a former sector of British Rail
- North–South Expressway (Malaysia)
- North–South Expressway, Singapore
- Norwegian Air Sweden, a Swedish low-cost airline

== Education ==
- Norwegian School of Economics, a business school in Bergen, Norway
- National Spanish Examinations, an online assessment for students studying Spanish as a second language in the United States
- National Student Exchange, an exchange program for American and Canadian undergraduate students

== Computing ==
- Namespace Shell Extension, see shell extension
- Network Search Engine, a device that helps computer network routers accelerate one of the most common functions: searching for patterns/addresses in data packets
- Network Software Environment, an early project aware revision control system implemented on top of the Source Code Control System
- Nmap Scripting Engine, a feature of the Nmap security scanner that allows users to write (and share) simple scripts

== Science ==
- Navier–Stokes equations, describing motion of fluid substances
- Neuron-specific enolase, is an enzyme used to identify neuronal cells and cells with neuroendocrine differentiation
- Neutron spin echo, an spectroscopic method, using inelastic neutron scattering
- Nash-Sutcliffe model efficiency coefficient, a statistical index

== Other uses ==
- National Support Element, a military term for a supply and support unit deployed primarily in Hungary
- National Society for Epilepsy, a United Kingdom-based epilepsy charity
- New Schubert Edition, a 20th–21st century edition of the complete works of Franz Schubert
- Non-Speaking Extra, an extra
- NSE: Net Sphere Engineer, a 2004 manga by Tsutomu Nihei
- Nu Skin Enterprises, a direct selling multi-level marketing company
