= Aniekan Bassey =

Nigerian Politician (born 1942)

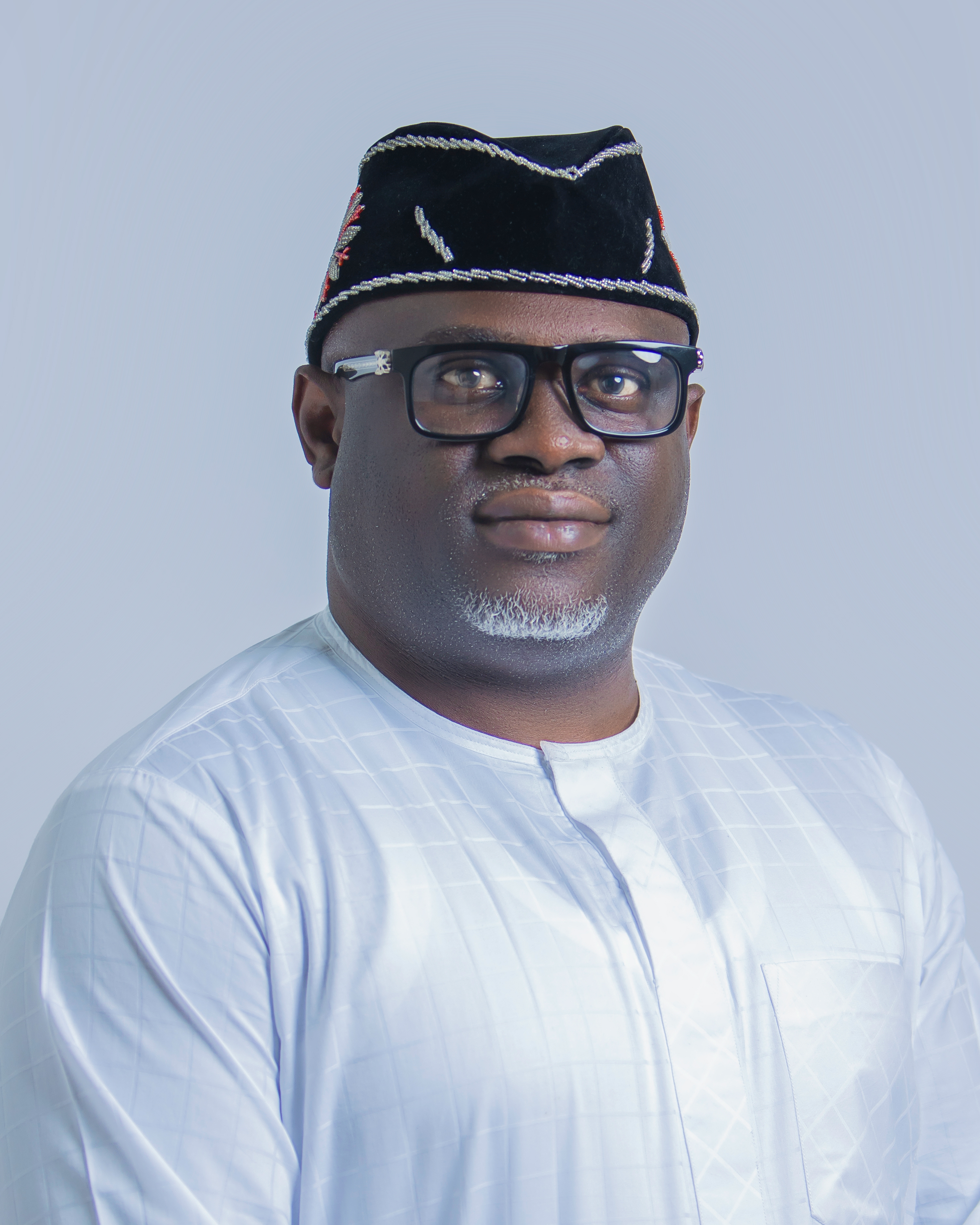
- Senator Aniekan Bassey

Deputy Chairman of the Senate Committee on Agriculture Production Services and Rural Development
- Incumbent
- Assumed office 13 June 2023
- Constituency: Akwa Ibom North-East Senatorial District

Senator for Akwa Ibom North-East
- Preceded by: Bassey Albert

Personal details
- Party: Peoples Democratic Party (Nigeria) (2014–present)
- Spouse: Itohowo Aniekan Bassey
- Education: University of Uyo
- Occupation: Politician; Businessman
- Website: aniekanbassey.org

Aniekan Etim Bassey is a Nigerian businessman and politician who is currently serving in the 10th Senate as Senator representing the Akwa Ibom North-East Senatorial District and Deputy Chairman of the Senate Committee on Agriculture Production Services and Rural Development. He served as the 7th Speaker of the Akwa Ibom State House of Assembly, representing Uruan State Constituency from 2015 to 2023. He has been an Executive Member, Commonwealth Parliamentary Association (Africa Region) since 2021. During his tenure as Speaker of the Akwa Ibom State House of Assembly, he also served as Vice Chairman of the Conference of Speakers of State Legislatures in Nigeria, Chairman, South-South Speakers Forum and Chairman of the House Committee on Parliamentary Affairs.

He is the Chairman of RHAB-YESS Foundation, a project he developed aimed at discovering, mentoring and supporting young Akwa Ibom entrepreneurs and rural women with scholarships for indigent students. The Foundation also aims to provide shelter to vulnerable widows in Akwa Ibom State.
