= Mai Mala Buni =

Nigerian politician (born 1967)

His Excellency Mai Mala Buni CON
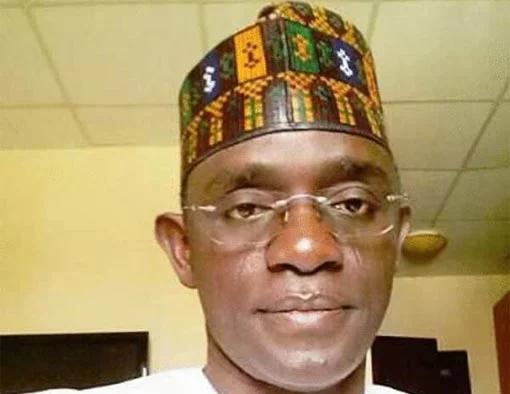

Governor of Yobe State
- Incumbent
- Assumed office 29 May 2019
- Deputy: Idi Barde Gubana
- Preceded by: Ibrahim Geidam

Caretaker Chairman of the All Progressives Congress
- In office 25 June 2020 – 22 March 2022
- Preceded by: Adams Oshiomhole
- Succeeded by: Abdullahi Adamu

National Secretary of the All Progressives Congress
- In office 14 June 2014 – March 2019
- Preceded by: Tijjani Tumsah
- Succeeded by: Victor Giadom

Personal details
- Born: 19 November 1967 (age 58) Gujba, North-Eastern State (now in Yobe State), Nigeria
- Party: All Progressive Congress
- Education: Espam Formation University; Leeds Beckett University
- Occupation: Politician

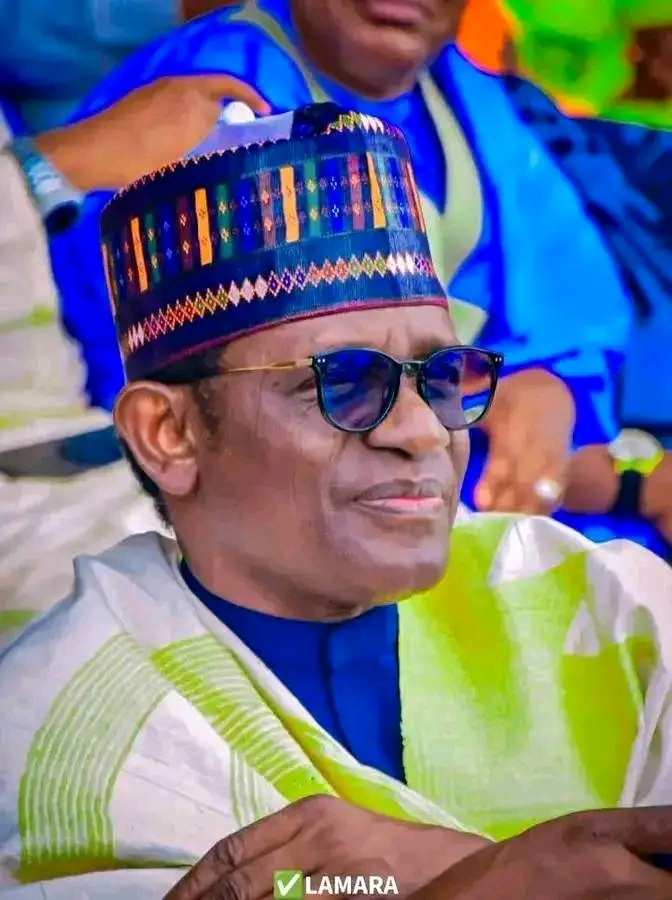
Governor of Yobe state

Mai Mala Buni CON (born 19 November 1967) is a Nigerian politician who has been serving as the governor of Yobe State since 2019. He was elected as governor during the 2019 Nigeria general elections under the platform of the All Progressives Congress. Prior to his election as governor, he held the position of national secretary of the All Progressives Congress.

== Early life and education ==
Buni was born on 19 November 1967 in Buni Yadi, Gujba, then North-Eastern State. As it is with the tradition in Northern Nigeria, Buni started memorising the Quran at an early age under the tutelage of his parents and other clerics before his enrolment into Buni Gari central primary school where he obtained the First School Leaving Certificate in 1979.

After completing his primary education, Buni gained admission into Government Secondary School Goniri in 1979 and obtained the West African Examinations Council certificate in 1985.

While in active politics, Buni enrolled as a part-time student at the Espam Formation University, Benin Republic where he obtained a B.Sc. Degree in International relations in 2014. He holds a Master's degree in International relations from Leeds Beckett University, United Kingdom.

== Private business ==
With a background in the family business of trade and transport, Buni also ventured into business at a very young age after completion of his secondary education. The quest to establish a factory to start a private company in furniture, took Mai Mala Buni to College of Vocational Science and Technology where he obtained Diploma certificate in 2012.

Mai Mala Buni chaired the board of several companies among which are:

- MBG Integrated farms Ltd
- MMB Petroleum and Chemical Company Nig. Ltd
- MBG Construction and General Services Ltd
- Buni Gari and Company Nig. Ltd
- Bright View Capital Alliance Ltd
- Subi Mega Global Solutions Ltd
- Rehab Synergy Nig. Ltd
- First Integrated and Logistics Services Ltd

== Politics ==
Mala Buni started his political journey in 1992 when he contested and won a Councilor seat under the platform of National Republican Convention (NRC) party, to represent Buni ward in the Gujba Local Government Area Council. He was subsequently elected as the speaker of the council.

He became a senior legislative assistant in Nigeria's National assembly in 2000, and in 2004, he was appointed member of the University of Uyo governing council.

In 2006, he was unanimously elected Chairman of the Advanced Congress of Democrats in Yobe state and when in 2007, members of the Action Congress party in the state entered into alliance with the Advanced Congress of Democrats to form a formidable force on the platform of the Action Congress, the alliance unilaterally penciled him down unopposed for the Chairman of the Action Congress party and was subsequently elected where he served as chairman from 2007 to 2010.

In 2011, Buni joined the then ruling All Nigeria Peoples Party (ANPP) in Yobe state and was appointed Special Adviser on Political Affairs and Legislative Matters to Yobe state Governor Ibrahim Gaidam. In 2013 after the merger of the mega political parties to form the All Progressives Congress (APC), Mai Mala Buni became the pro tem state secretary of the party in Yobe state and was subsequently elected the pioneer state Chairman of the All Progressives Congress in Yobe state.

In 2014, Mai Mala Buni became the first elected National Secretary of the All Progressives Congress. It was that same regime of the party that ushered in the administration of President Muhammadu Buhari in 2015. His commitment to serving the party, automatically earned him a second term as the national secretary in 2018.

While serving as APC national secretary and board Chairman of the Nigeria Shippers Council, he was nominated, endorsed and elected as flag bearer of APC for the 2019 Yobe State gubernatorial election.

During the 2019 general elections, Hon. Mai Mala was elected as the fourth Executive Governor of Yobe state when he scored the highest votes of 444,013 to beat his opponent Alhaji Bello Iliya of the People Democratic Party (PDP) who scored 95, 703 only.

In June 2020, the national working committee of All Progressive Congress (APC) party was dissolved and in its place, a new interim committee was inaugurated and is chaired by Hon. Mai Mala Buni will also serve as chairman of the party's extraordinary convention committee.

The committee is saddled with the responsibility of steering the activities of the party for an initial period of six months and also to prepare and conducingt the party's extraordinary national convention.

During a national executive council meeting held at the state house Abuja on 8 December 2020, the tenure of the interim committee/extraordinary convention committee was extended for another six months.

== Yobe State Governor ==
On 29 May 2019, during his inauguration as the executive governor of Yobe state, Mai Mala Buni stated that "Our administration would strive to ensure prompt payment of counterpart funds to the Universal Basic Education Commission (UBEC), to enable the State access UBEC grants to improve primary education. We would equally build more schools classrooms, employ more teachers as well as improve teachers' incentives, and provide additional instructional materials to meet the requirements of such communities. This approach would be replicated in the secondary education sector; we will equally make the teaching profession attractive and education more functional. The payment of examination fees by the government to students in public schools would be sustained. Parents and guardians in the state would be free from the burden of paying school and examination fees for their wards. In order to improve and encourage pupil enrollment in our schools, this administration will partner with the Federal Government for the implementation of the Home Grown Feeding Program."

As of April 2020, the state government under his leadership has spent over 2.1 billion naira in the construction of 7 model primary school in different locations in Yobe State. The projects are aimed at decongesting schools in the urban areas that are currently overstretched as a result of fleeing internally displaced eprsons.

Yobe State being among the worst-hit states affected by Boko Haram insurgency, Governor Mai Mala Buni has facilitated the return of many internally displaced persons (IDPs) by reconstruction of their houses and provision of livelihood support packages. The state in conjunction with the African Development Bank under the Agro-Processing, Productivity Enhancement, and Livelihood Improvement Support, APPEALS, Project has distributed livelihood support packages to over 5,000 IDPs.

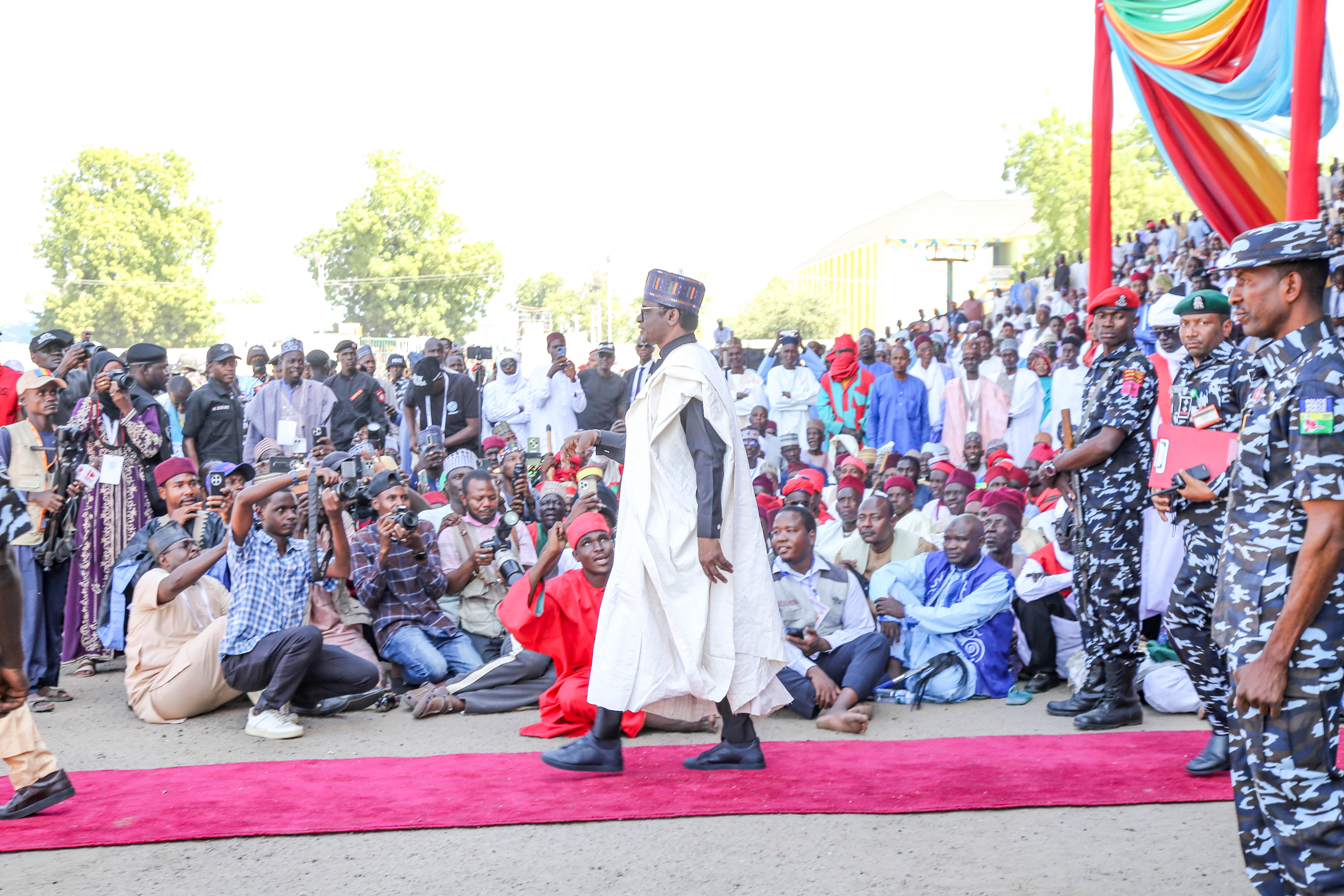
Mai Mala Buni at Kanem Borno Cultural Summit 2026.

In September 2020, the government inaugurated the construction of houses for IDPs. The project was sponsored by the Nigerian National Petroleum Corporation (NNPC), Shell Petroleum Development Company of Nigeria Limited (SPDC) Joint Venture (JV), Shell Nigeria Exploration and Production Company Limited (SNEPCO) and Total Nigeria Plc.

In the health sector, government has constructed 53 out of 178 proposed functional Primary Health Care Centers provided with laboratories, pharmacies, Malemand Femafemale wards, housing quarters for health personnel posted to these centers for 24/7 service to the communities.

In housing development, 1,800 housing units under the first phase of the state's mass housing program are currently under construction in the six urban centers of the state, while the construction of another set of 1,800 units under the second phase is expected to take off after the completion of the first phase.

== Award ==
In October 2022, a Nigerian national honor of Commander Of The Order Of The Niger (CON), was conferred on him by President Muhammadu Buhari.

== See also ==
- Yobe State
- List of governors of Yobe State
- List of villages in Yobe State
- List of current state governors in Nigeria
- Nigeria Governors' Forum
