= Fune =

- LGA
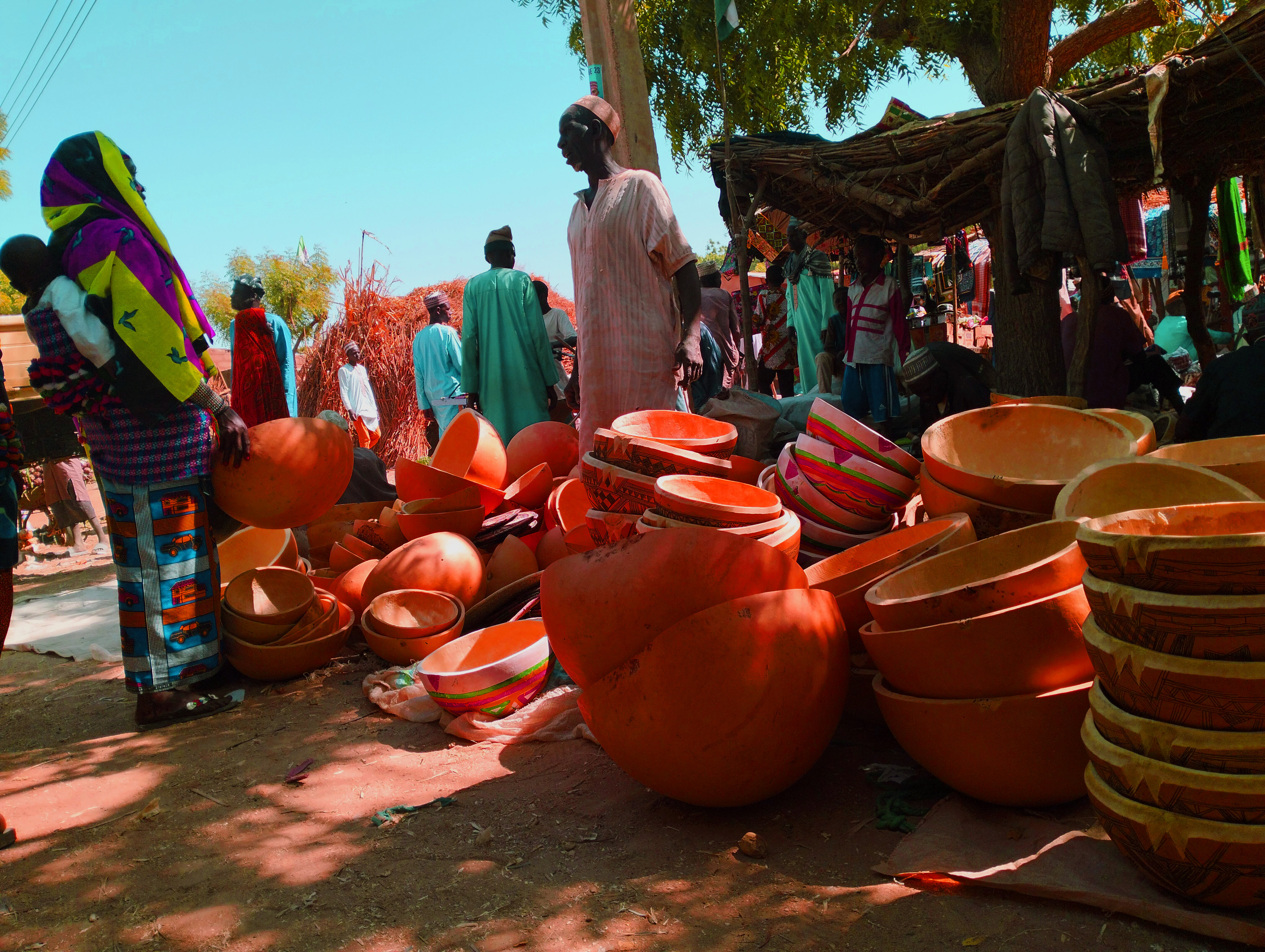
- A Fulani Woman buying a Calabash in the Kolere market, Fune, Yobe State
- Motto: Fune tafi Jam'iyya
- Interactive map of Fune
- Location in Nigeria
- Coordinates: 11°53′N 11°54′E
- Country: Nigeria
- State: Yobe State
- Headquarter: Damagum

Government
  - Local Government Chairman: Baba Goni Bade (APC)

Area
  - Total: 4,948 km^{2} (1,910 sq mi)

Population (2006 census)
  - Total: 300,760
  - Density: 60.78/km^{2} (157.4/sq mi)
- Time zone: UTC+1 (WAT)
- 3-digit postal code prefix: 622
- ISO 3166 code: NG.YO.FU

Fune is a Local Government Area (LGA) in Yobe State, Nigeria. Its headquarters are in the town of Damagum in the southwest of the area on the A3 highway at 11°40′39″N 11°20′04″E. It has an area of 4,948 km^{2} and a population of 300,760 at the 2006 census. The postal code of the area is 622.

== Geography/climate ==
The northeasterly line of equal latitude and longitude passes through the area, including 11°30′00″N 11°30′00″E. Fune LGA occupies a total land area of 4,948 square kilometres or 1,910 square miles. It experiences two distinct seasons: the dry season and the rainy season. During the dry season, the region is characterized by intense sunshine and elevated temperatures. Flowing through Fune LGA is the Komadugu Gana River. The average temperature in this area is approximately 34°C/93°F.

== Economic ==
The primary economic activity in Fune LGA revolves around agriculture, encompassing the cultivation of various crops. Additionally, residents engage in the rearing of livestock such as cattle, goats, and donkeys. Trade plays a pivotal role in the local economy, with Fune LGA hosting several markets, including the renowned Ngelzarma cattle market. Furthermore, the people of Fune LGA are involved in diverse economic pursuits, including hunting, pottery, and matmaking.

== People ==
The main settlement tribe of Fune local governments are Karai-karai, Kanuri, Bura-Pabir, Ngizim, and Fulani. The current emir of Fune is Alhaji (Dr.) Saleh Idriss Ibn Uthman with his palace situated at Damagum, the head quarterof Fune local government.

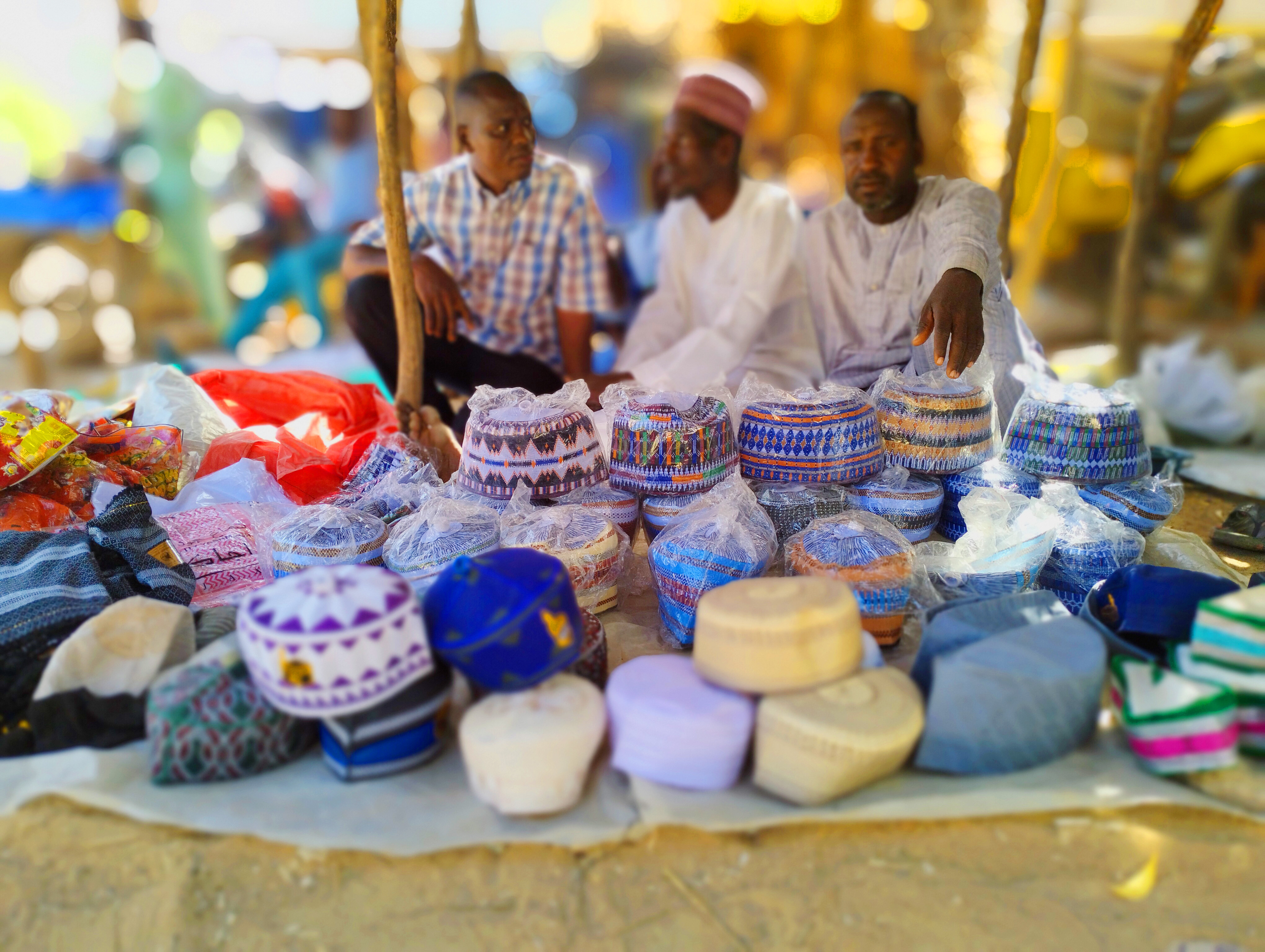

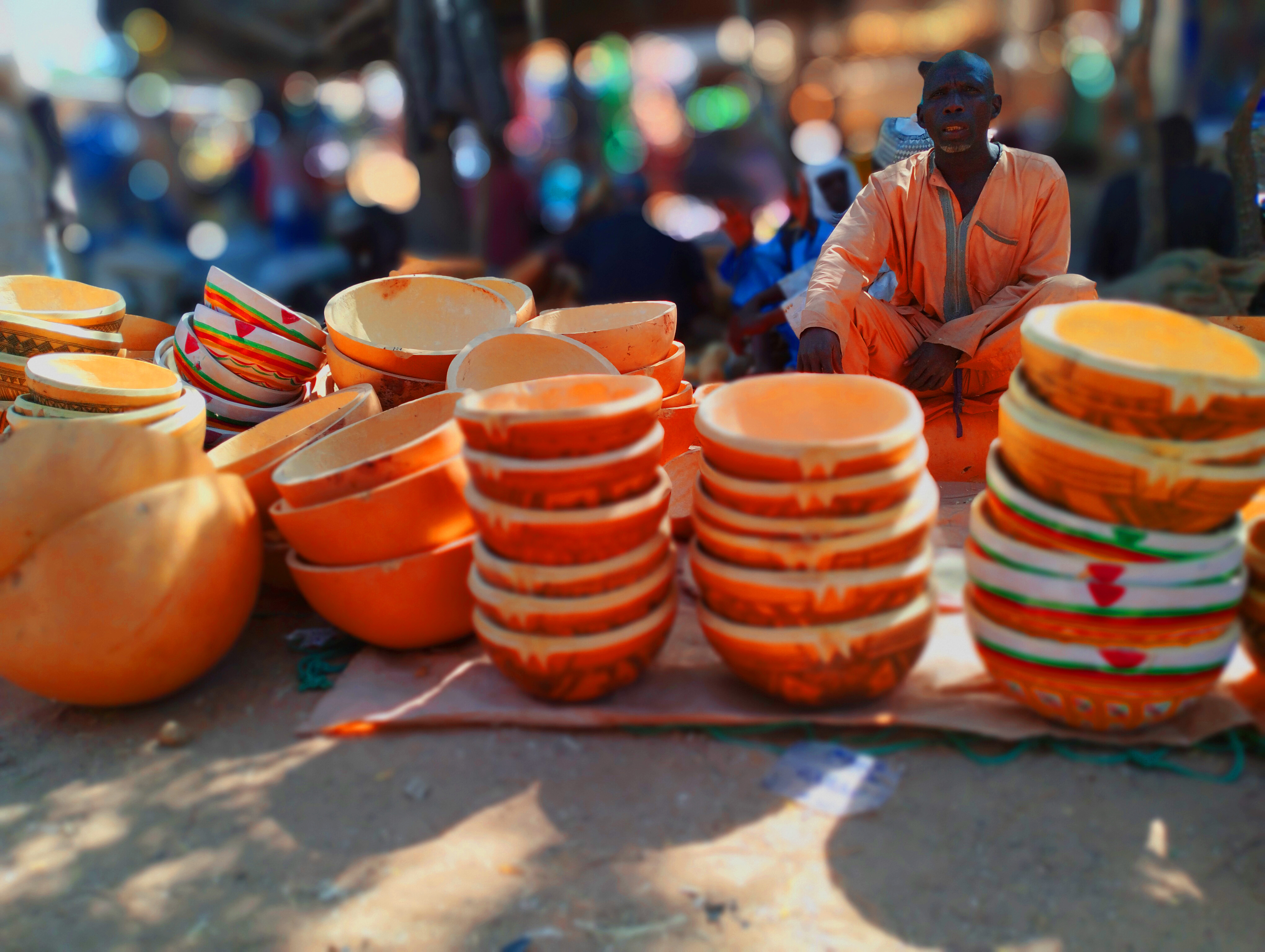

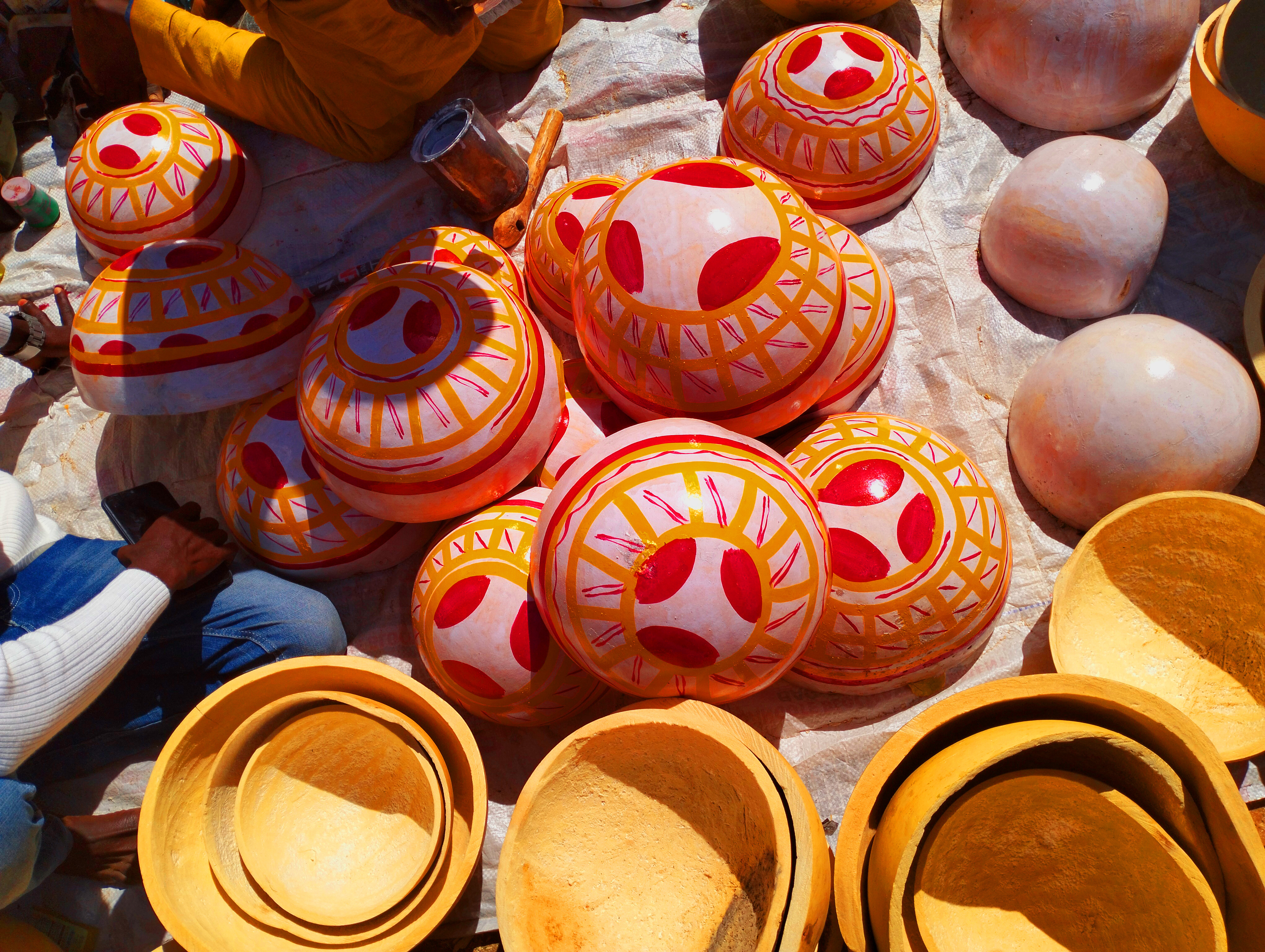
Decorated Calabash sell at Kolere market

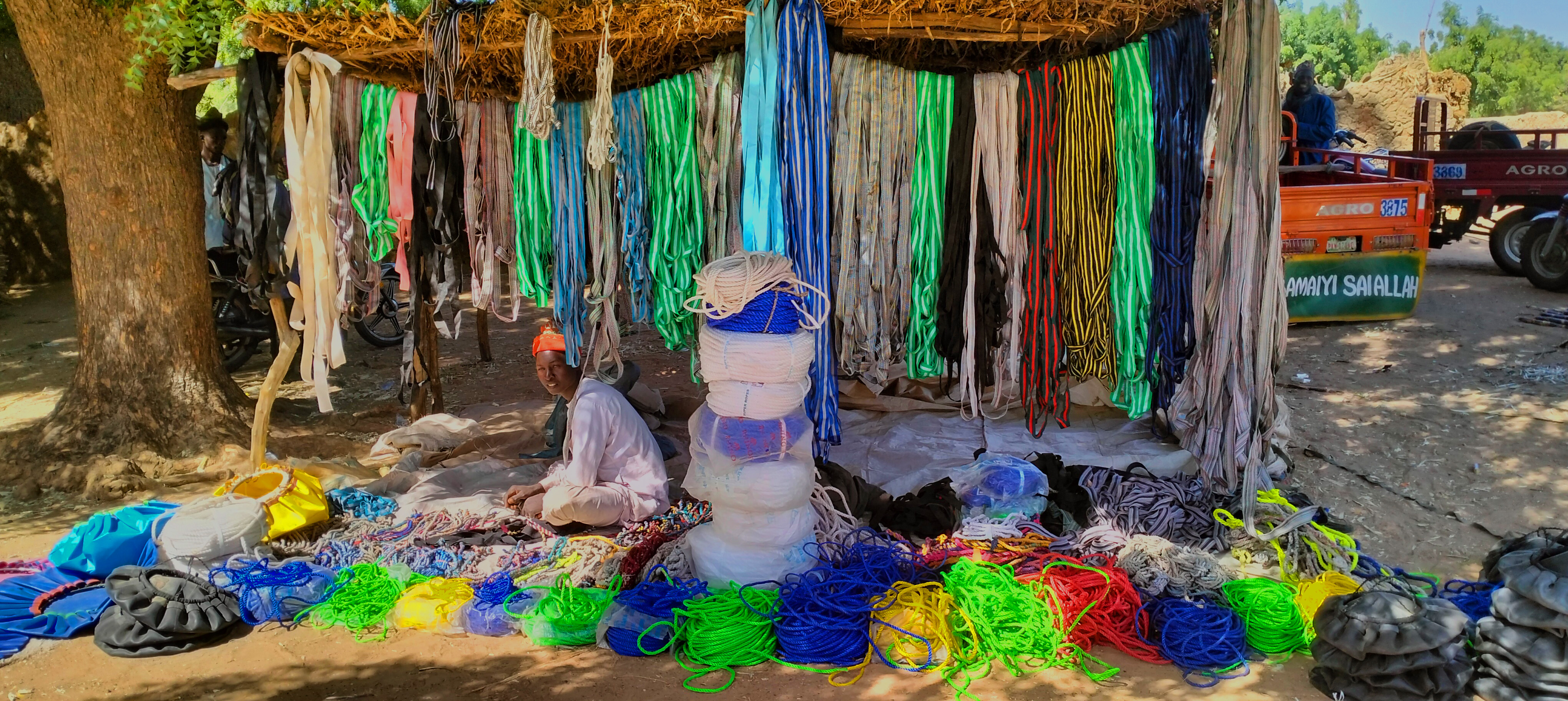

== Historical monuments ==
In 1987, the 8,000-year-old Dufuna canoe was discovered in Fune, near the village of Dufuna and the Komadugu Gana River.

== See also ==
- List of Local Government Areas in Yobe State
