= Akwa Ibom State House of Assembly =

- Akwa Ibom State

History
- Preceded by: Aniekan Bassey

Leadership
- Akwa Ibom House of Assembly, Speaker, PDP Nigeria since June 9, 2023

The Akwa Ibom State House of Assembly is the state legislature of Akwa Ibom State in Nigeria. It is located at Udoudoma Avenue, a business district. The Akwa Ibom State House of Assembly is currently under the People's Democratic Party which is the current party ruling Akwa Ibom State. There have been seven different houses of assemblies the very first one was inaugurated 2 October 1998. There are currently 26 members of the House of Assembly, representing one of the various local government areas in Akwa Ibom.

The present speaker of the House of Assembly is Rt.Hon. Udeme Otong, honorable member representing Abak State Constituency, the 8th assembly speaker of the Akwa Ibom State House of Assembly Nigeria.

The current deputy Speaker is Rt. Hon. Kufreabasi Edidem, Hon. Member representing Itu State Constituency.

== Members ==
Akwa Ibom State house of assembly has 26 members. The current set elected in 2023 general elections form members of the 8th State Assembly and are listed below

Members of the 8th Assembly
Name	Position	Constituency	Party
Udeme Otong	Speaker	Abak	
Nsidibe Akata	Member	Eket	
Udobia Friday Udo	Member	Esit Eket/Ibeno	
Prince Ukpong Akpabio	Member	Essien Udim	
Mfon Idung	Member	Etim Ekpo/Ika	
Uduak Obong Ekpo	Member	Etinan	
Ubong Attah	Member	Ibesikpo Asutan	
Moses Essien	Member	Ibiono Ibom	
Asuquo Nana Udo	Member	Ikono	
Mrs. Selinau Ukpatu	Member	Ikot Abasi/Eastern Obolo	
Jerry Anson Otu	Member	Ikot Ekpene/Obot Akara	
Lawrence Udoide	Member	Ini	
KufreAbasi Edidem	Deputy Speaker	Itu	
Effiong Johnson	Member	Mbo	
Uwem Peter	Member	Mkpat Enin	
Prince-Aniefok Okon	Member	Nsit Atai	
Eric Akpan	Member	Nsit Ibom	
Otobong Bob	Member	Nsit Ubium	
Bassey Pius Bassey	Member	Okobo	
Otuekong Nse Essien	Member	Onna	
Mrs. Kenim Victor	Member	Oron/Udung Uko	
Samson Idiong	Member	Oruk Anam	
Emem Etokabasi Udom	Member	Ukanafun	
Itorobong Etim	Member	Uruan	
Mrs. Precious Selong	Member	Urue Offong/Oruko	
Uwemedimo Dianabasi	Member	Uyo	
