= Khady Camara =

Senegalese environmental activist

- Born: Senegal
- Occupations: climate activist and environmental organizer
- Known for: Founder of Vacances Vertes; climate justice activism
- Style: voice for environmental issues in Senegal, advocating for women's active participation in climate discussions and local conservation efforts.

Khady Camara is a Senegalese climate activist and environmental organizer who has led community marches and campaigns advocating for climate justice. She is the founder and leader of the ecofeminist association Vacances Vertes, which promotes environmental education, green entrepreneurship, and ecosystem restoration in Senegal. Camara has helped organize annual women's climate marches in Dakar and has advocated for a stronger international commitments on climate policy.

== Early activism ==
Camara emerged as a voice for environmental issues in Senegal, advocating for women's active participation in climate discussions and local conservation efforts. She organized grassroots protests and marches calling for climate justice ahead of international climate summits such as COP28.

Through the Vacances Vertes association, Camara works to educate communities, especially women and youth, about environmental protection, tree planting, and sustainable living practices. The organization has conducted campaigns aimed at reforestation and agroecology.

== Public advocacy ==
Camara's activism includes mobilizing rural and urban communities to demand that developed nations meet their climate commitments and support climate adaptation efforts in Africa. She has emphasized the impacts of climate change on agriculture, food security, and women's livelihoods.
