= Desertification in Nigeria =

Desertification problem in Nigeria

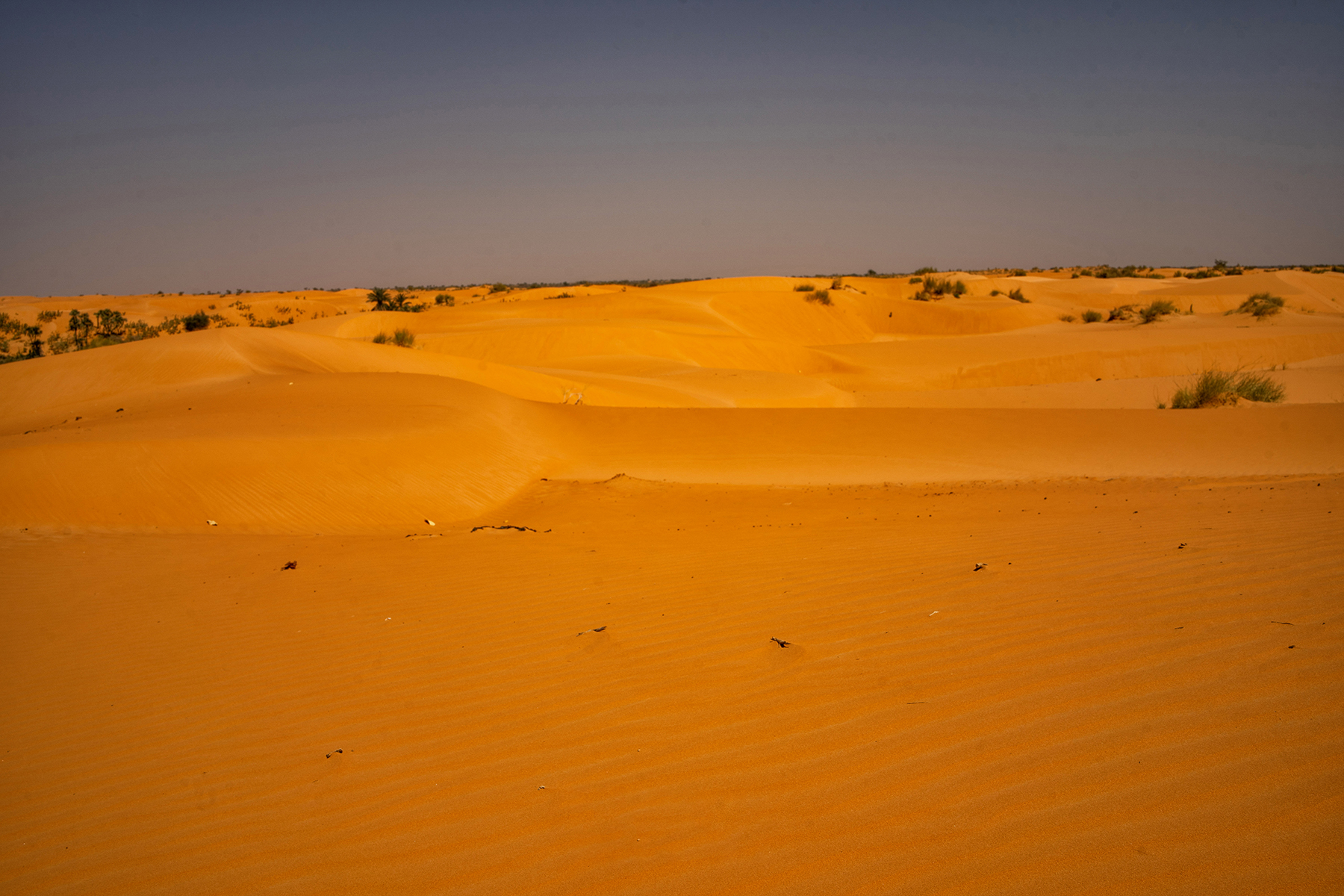
Tulo Tulo Desert dunes, Potiskum, Yobe State

The severity of desertification in the drylands of the world made the United Nations Organization to adopt a Convention to Combat Desertification (CCD) in 1994. Nigeria approved the National Action Programme (NAP) as a primary tool for the implementation of the Convention in 1997.

Nigeria is a country with most part of its area extending into the Sudano-sahelian belt, which joins the northern Guinea savanna. Nigeria has an estimated population of 113 million where human activities continues to take its toll on the environment, which ultimately results in desertification.

Desertification gets severe in the drylands of the country with increase in human attempts to exploit the resources of the ecological zone in the face of persistent drought. Before today, Nigeria has been tackling the problem of desertification the best way it could, but with little success. There is need that this should be addressed in a systemic manner in order to ensure that these lands keep supporting human and natural resources.

== Current Situation and Scale of Desertification in Nigeria ==
Desertification is one of the issues of environmental concern in Nigeria, particularly the northern part of the country. According to UNEP in 1993, Northern Nigeria has one of the highest rates of deforestation in the world at about 3.5%, caused by land degradation, increase in agricultural intensity, over-grazing of livestock, and demand for fuel by cutting down trees. Very little effort has been directed to monitoring across the entire northern region bordering the Sahel.

Annually, Nigeria loses up to 350,000 hectares of land to desert encroachment which as resulted to demographic displacements in villages across 11 states in the North. Nigeria loses approximately $5.1billion every year owing to rapid encroachment of drought and desert in most parts of the north.

According to the Nigerian government, desertification now affects 43% of Nigeria’s landmass (~923,000 km²), threatening the livelihoods of over 40 million people. Over 40 million Nigerians livelihoods are threatened. In some northern states (Bauchi, Borno, Gombe, Jigawa, Kano, Katsina, Kebbi, Sokoto, Yobe, Zamfara), 50%–75% of land is reportedly desertifying.

== Causes of desertification in Nigeria ==
Natural causes such as climate change, increased variability of droughts, human activities such as inappropriate use of technologies in agriculture and land management, land demand by the rapid growth population of the country are the agents of desertification in Nigeria.

The National Environmental Standards and Regulations Enforcement Agency (NESREA) notes that overgrazing, bush burning, deforestation, and compacted soil contribute heavily.

According to a 2009-2010 study, 50%–75% of certain northern states are affected due to soil vulnerability and land pressure.

=== Natural Causes ===
Variation in climate is the most natural cause of desertification and drought in the dry lands of Nigeria. Other natural causes of desertification include the poor physical conditions of soils, vegetation, topography.

=== Human activities ===
The Human impact on the environment factor is mainly the disruption of the ecological system caused by poor land use and increasing pressure on the available resources by the growing population. Precisely, there are four primary causes which are over-exploitation, over-grazing, deforestation and poor irrigation practices, influenced by changes in population, climate and socio-economic conditions. Improper land-use practices and poor land management. Wood Extraction for fuel and construction Without other sources of energy also contributes to the disruption, the demand for fuel wood is on steady increase as a result of increasing population and rapid urbanization. Bush burning is also an agent which is done by human during land clearing for agriculture, hunters in search of game, set fire onto the vegetation, and cattle herdsmen who set fire to dry grass to stimulate growth of dormant grass buds. Herdsmen in search of suitable pastures over graze on farmlands.

== Impact of desertification ==
=== Desertification’s consequences are wide-ranging ===
- Food insecurity

Desertification has become a source of threat to food production. It is equally believed that the hostile impact of climate change in Northern Nigeria constitutes a serious threat to national security and strategies against poverty alleviation in the country as those mostly affected are the most vulnerable in the security that live in the villages destroyed by this persistent occurrence.

- Livelihood displacement:

Rural and pastoral communities face displacement and resource conflict due to declining land quality.

== Efforts at combating desertification in Nigeria ==
In order to combat desertification, the Nigeria government has established several initiatives in the agriculture sector including afforestation and reforestation programs, dissemination of proven agricultural technologies and sustainable agricultural practices, and promotion of efficient energy sources. Efforts also include involving local communities in conservation programs, intensifying international cooperation, inventorying degraded lands, adopting an integrated approach to address desertification on multiple levels, cooperating with organizations, and ensuring food security by reviewing and enforcing cattle routes and grazing reserves.

These efforts are complicated by the need to feed a rapidly increasing population in a region where natural resources are dwindling and over 90 percent of national food production depends on small holder farmers who lack the capacity to increase food production without degrading land.

=== National policies ===
The Federal Government of Nigeria focuses on combating desertification through various national policies, such as developing action programs, raising public awareness, strengthening institutions, promoting sustainable practices, encouraging community participation, and establishing early warning systems.

=== Tree-planting initiatives ===
Planting of trees is one of suggested solutions to replenishing the biodiversity of the land areas. There are several agencies, different state governments in Nigeria that are encouraging their citizens to plant tree in order to combat desertification.

== Organizations committed to fighting desertification in Nigeria ==
- National Agency for the Great Green Walls (NAGGW)
