= Reforestation in Nigeria =

Environmental efforts to restore forest cover in Nigeria

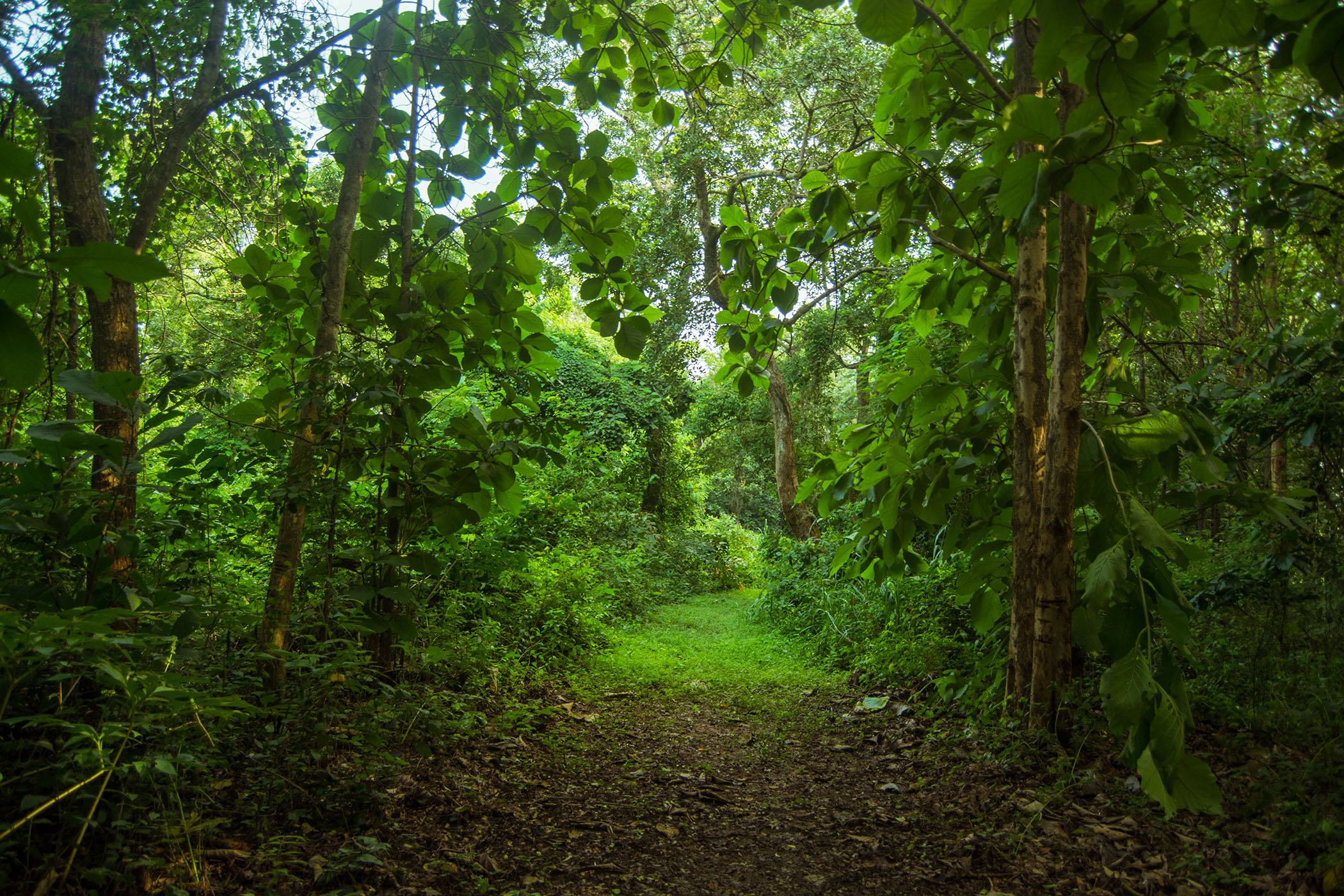
Forest nursery located in the compound of the Federal University of Agriculture, Abeokuta

Reforestation in Nigeria employs both natural and artificial methods. Reforestation involves the deliberate planting of trees and restoring forested areas that have been depleted or destroyed. It involves a planned restocking of the forest to ensure sustainable supply of timber and other forest products. Reforestation, in essence, involves replenishing forests to guarantee a consistent and sustainable supply of timber and various other forest resources. This objective can be accomplished through either natural regeneration techniques or artificial regeneration methods. Both of these approaches have been utilized in the reforestation efforts within Nigeria's forests. At the initiation of the reforestation program in Nigeria, the natural regeneration approach was chosen for two primary reasons. Firstly, it aimed to preserve the rainforest in its original state by allowing it to regenerate naturally from the existing seed bank in the soil. Secondly, and of significant importance, this method was selected due to budgetary constraints, as there were insufficient funds available to establish plantations through direct means.

== Background ==
Reforestation, generally, has many advantages. Equatorial forests, such as those in Nigeria, are often biodiverse ecosystems that support various flora and fauna, promoting ecological balance. Forests play a crucial role in absorbing carbon dioxide from the atmosphere and act as carbon sinks. Sequestering carbon reduces greenhouse gas emissions. Reforestation helps prevent erosion by stabilizing soil, reducing runoff, and promoting humus production from organic matter in situ. Forests play a vital role in regulating water cycles and maintaining healthy Nigerian watersheds. Reforestation helps protect water sources, improves water quality, and reduces the risk of flooding, benefiting both urban and rural communities. Reforestation and afforestation promotes the sustainable management of forest resources, including timber, non-timber forest products, and medicinal plants.

== History ==
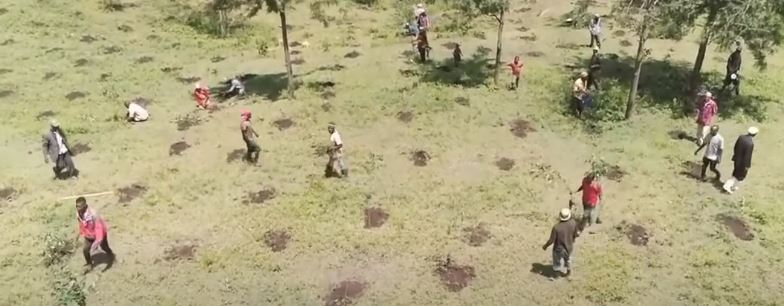
Planting of trees

Early attempts at reforestation were based on the tropical shelterwood system of forest regeneration which did not yield the desired result. This forced the Nigerian government to switch over to the artificial regeneration through the establishment of forest plantation in the country. The choice of plants for the plantations were based on industrial needs and growth rate of the plants. As a result, the tropical hardwood such as Milicia excelsa and Antiaris africana were shoved aside and replace with exotic and fast growing species like Tectona grandis (Teak), eucalyptus, pines, and Gmelina arborea. Tectona grandis and eucalyptus were preferred because of their straight poles and hardness, which make them fantastic for use as electric transmission poles, while Gmelina and pine were preferred for pulp production, which is used in the manufacture of newsprint and paper.

In 1997, Nigeria's areas of estimated forest plantation was 150,000 hectares. Between 1970 and 1984, 82,434 hectares of plantation were established. By 1998, Nigeria has 196,000 ha and 704 ha in protected areas outside the forest reserves. Between 1985 and 2005, three percent of Nigeria's forest reserves were plantations. In 2010, Nigeria had a total plantation area of 382,000 ha. Gmelina and teak make up about 44 percent of the total trees in the plantation.

At the initiation of the reforestation program in Nigeria, the natural regeneration approach was chosen for two primary reasons. Firstly, it aimed to preserve the rainforest in its original state by allowing it to regenerate naturally from the existing seed bank in the soil. Secondly, and of significant importance, this method was selected due to budgetary constraints, as there were insufficient funds available to establish plantations through direct means.

During the implementation of the Timber Stand Improvement (TSS) initiative, a concurrent endeavor emerged, wherein select colonial forest officers ventured into pioneering trials of artificial regeneration within the confines of Nigeria's moist forest zone. In the year 1930, this distinctive initiative was spearheaded by J. D. Kennedy at Sapoba in Edo State and D. MacGregor at Olokemeji in Oyo State. Notably, these innovative trials encompassed the cultivation of both indigenous and exotic tree species and were meticulously executed within the structured framework of the Taungya Farming System.

== Environmental context ==
The environmental context refers to the general state and conditions of the surroundings within a particular region or area. This encompasses various factors, together with natural resources, ecosystems, climate, and human sports. In Nigeria, the environmental context is various and complicated. It's miles characterized by an extensive range of ecosystems, including rainforests, savannas, wetlands, and coastal areas. Nigeria is located in West Africa and has a tropical climate, with a wet season and a dry season.

== Deforestation trends in Nigeria ==
Deforestation in Nigeria has been a significant environmental issue for several decades. It is primarily driven by various factors, including:

1. Agricultural Expansion: The need for land to cultivate crops and rear livestock is a major driver of deforestation. Small-scale subsistence farming as well as large-scale commercial agriculture contribute to this trend.
2. Logging and Timber Industry: The demand for timber and wood products, both domestically and internationally, leads to extensive logging activities. This is often done unsustainably, leading to the degradation of forested areas.
3. Infrastructure Development: Construction of roads, urban expansion, and other infrastructural developments often require clearing large areas of forest.
4. Mining Activities: Extractive industries, such as oil and mining, can result in the destruction of forests.
5. Population Growth and Urbanization: The rapid increase in population and urbanization leads to increased demand for housing and services, which can put pressure on forested areas.

=== Impact on biodiversity and ecosystems ===
1. Loss of Biodiversity: Deforestation in Nigeria leads to the loss of numerous plant and animal species. Forests are incredibly biodiverse, and when they are cleared, many species lose their habitats and are at risk of extinction.
2. Disruption of Ecosystems: Forests play a crucial role in maintaining a balance within ecosystems. Their removal can disrupt the delicate relationships between plants, animals, and microorganisms.
3. Soil Erosion and Degradation: Tree roots help hold soil in place, preventing erosion. Deforestation can lead to increased soil erosion, reducing soil fertility, and impacting agricultural productivity.
4. Climate Regulation: Forests act as carbon sinks, absorbing carbon dioxide from the atmosphere. When trees are cut down, this stored carbon is released back into the atmosphere, contributing to climate change.

== Climate change ==
Deforestation contributes significantly to climate change. When trees are removed, the carbon stored in them is released as carbon dioxide (CO_{2}), a greenhouse gas that contributes to climate change.

=== Reforestation as a mitigation strategy ===
Reforestation involves the replanting of trees in areas that have been previously deforested. It is a crucial strategy to mitigate the impacts of deforestation. Here are some key points regarding reforestation:

1. Carbon Sequestration: Reforestation helps to sequester carbon from the atmosphere, reducing greenhouse gas concentrations.
2. Habitat Restoration: It provides habitats for a wide range of species, helping to restore biodiversity.
3. Soil Protection: Trees help stabilize soil, preventing erosion and maintaining soil fertility.
4. Water Regulation: Forests play a vital role in regulating water flow in rivers and streams, reducing the risk of floods and ensuring a steady water supply.
5. Community Benefits: Reforestation can provide economic opportunities for communities through sustainable forestry practices, as well as supporting ecotourism.
6. Climate Resilience: Well-planned reforestation efforts can enhance the resilience of ecosystems and communities to the impacts of climate change.

== Current practice in reforesting Nigeria's forest estate ==
The historical trajectory of deforestation in Nigeria has exhibited a persistent upward trend since the inception of organized forestry development in 1906. During this period, both natural and artificial reforestation methods were not overlooked, although a significant proportion of initial plantings occurred on experimental and trial plots situated within forest reserves.

The transition from the Tropical Shelterwood System, which proved ineffective in forest regeneration, prompted early foresters to adopt artificial regeneration practices through the establishment of forest plantations across the nation. These plantations, as previously mentioned, encompassed a diverse array of both indigenous and exotic tree species, primarily selected based on their suitability for industrial purposes and their rapid growth characteristics.

The imperative of introducing exotic and fast-growing tree species into plantation development in Nigeria emerged due to the prolonged maturation period observed in tropical hardwoods such as Milicia excelsa and Antiaris africana, which typically spans 60 to 80 years. Notable exotic species were incorporated into the forestry landscape, including Tectona grandis and various Eucalyptus species, primarily on account of their straight boles and hardness. These attributes rendered them well-suited for applications such as electricity transmission line infrastructure.

A glimmer of optimism shines on the four core Niger Delta States, namely Akwa Ibom, Bayelsa, Delta, and Rivers, through the ongoing Niger Delta Biodiversity Project, which was initiated in 2013 within the region. The Community Biodiversity Action Plan represents a dedicated environmental restoration initiative. In collaboration with the Federal Government of Nigeria, the United Nations Development Programme (UNDP) and the Global Environment Facility (GEF) have embraced the Community Biodiversity Action Plan (CBAP) as a comprehensive strategy to address the pressing issues of deforestation and the consequential loss of biodiversity within the rural communities of the Niger Delta.

== Techniques ==
One of the major problems facing Nigerian forests is the shifting-cultivation method of farming, which depletes forests. Shifting cultivation is a method of farming in which a farmer relocates his farm to another place after a period of about three years, as a result of decline in crop yield. The row cropping system may be an alternative to shifting cultivation. The row-cropping method involves a compromise between row cropping and forestry. It involves the growing of food crops and forest crops together, as long as the forest crops allow sunlight to penetrate and reach the food crops. By this system, the land will be in continuous production, providing income to farmers and at the same time preserve the ecosystem.

== Challenges and considerations for reforestation in Nigeria ==
However, reforestation initiatives in Nigeria faces many obstacles. Among these challenges are inability of the country to maintain basic standard of acquiring regular and up-to-date information on its forest reserves. Most of the information used in making decision on Nigerian forests are based on obsolete information and extrapolation from very old data. In many states, for a period of 10 years (2005–2015), there was low level of government patronage on forest activities, as a result of lack of funds and non-functioning of pulp and paper industry, for which the government oversight was established. Nigerian government has made minimal investment in forestry management due to budgetary limitations.

1. Land Tenure and Ownership: Determining land rights and ownership can be complex, as multiple stakeholders may have claims to forested areas. Clearing up land tenure issues is essential for successful reforestation efforts.
2. Species Selection and Biodiversity: It's important to choose tree species that are native or well-suited to the local ecosystem. This promotes biodiversity and ensures that the newly planted trees can thrive.
3. Community Engagement and Participation: Engaging local communities in the reforestation process is crucial. They should be involved in planning, implementation, and management to ensure long-term success.
4. Monitoring and Evaluation: Establishing a robust monitoring and evaluation system helps track the progress of reforestation efforts, including survival rates of planted trees, biodiversity recovery, and carbon sequestration.
5. Sustainable Forest Management: Reforestation efforts should be part of a broader strategy for sustainable forest management. This includes practices like selective logging, agroforestry, and fire prevention.

== See also ==
- Deforestation in Nigeria
- Fuel wood utilization in Nigeria
- Environmental issues in the Niger Delta
