= Deforestation in Nigeria =

Causes and effects of forest loss in Nigeria

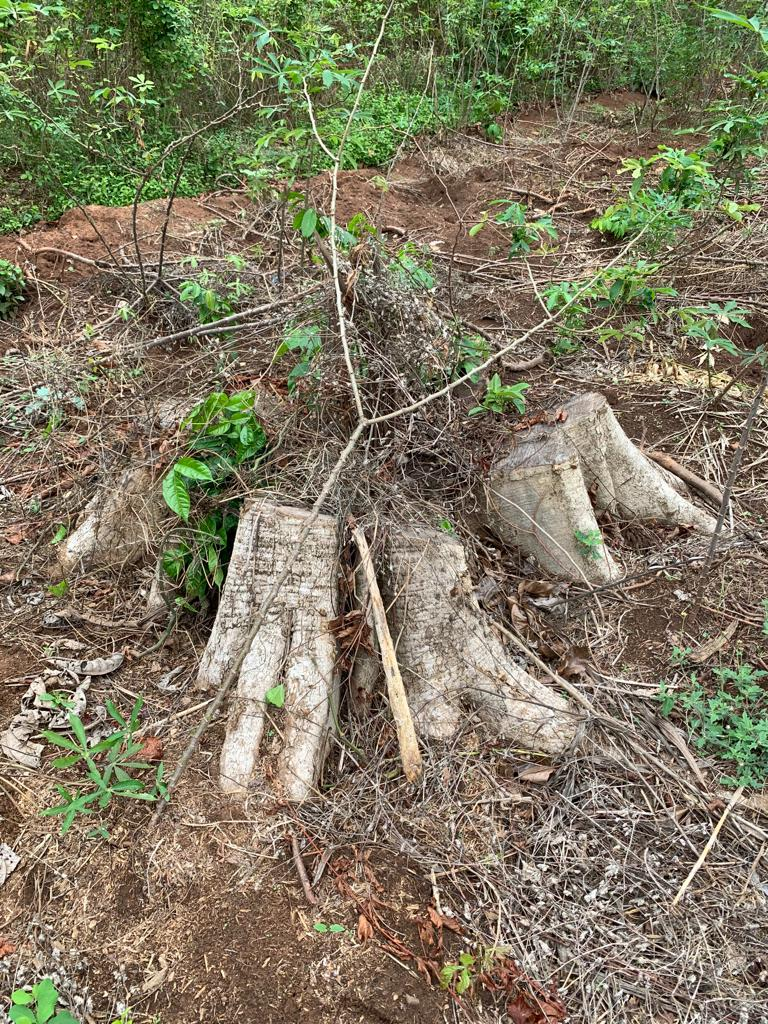
Deforestation in Anambra State, Nigeria

The extensive and rapid clearing of forests (deforestation) within the borders of Nigeria has significant impacts on both local and global scales.Deforestation estimates in Nigeria stand at 163 Kha/year, with 12% of tree cover lost between 2001 and 2022.

Activities such as expanding agriculture, logging, urbanisation, and infrastructure development contributes to deforestation and presents various challenges against afforestation efforts. Deforestation in Nigeria has raised concerns regarding its link to poverty and its environmental consequences.

== History and context ==
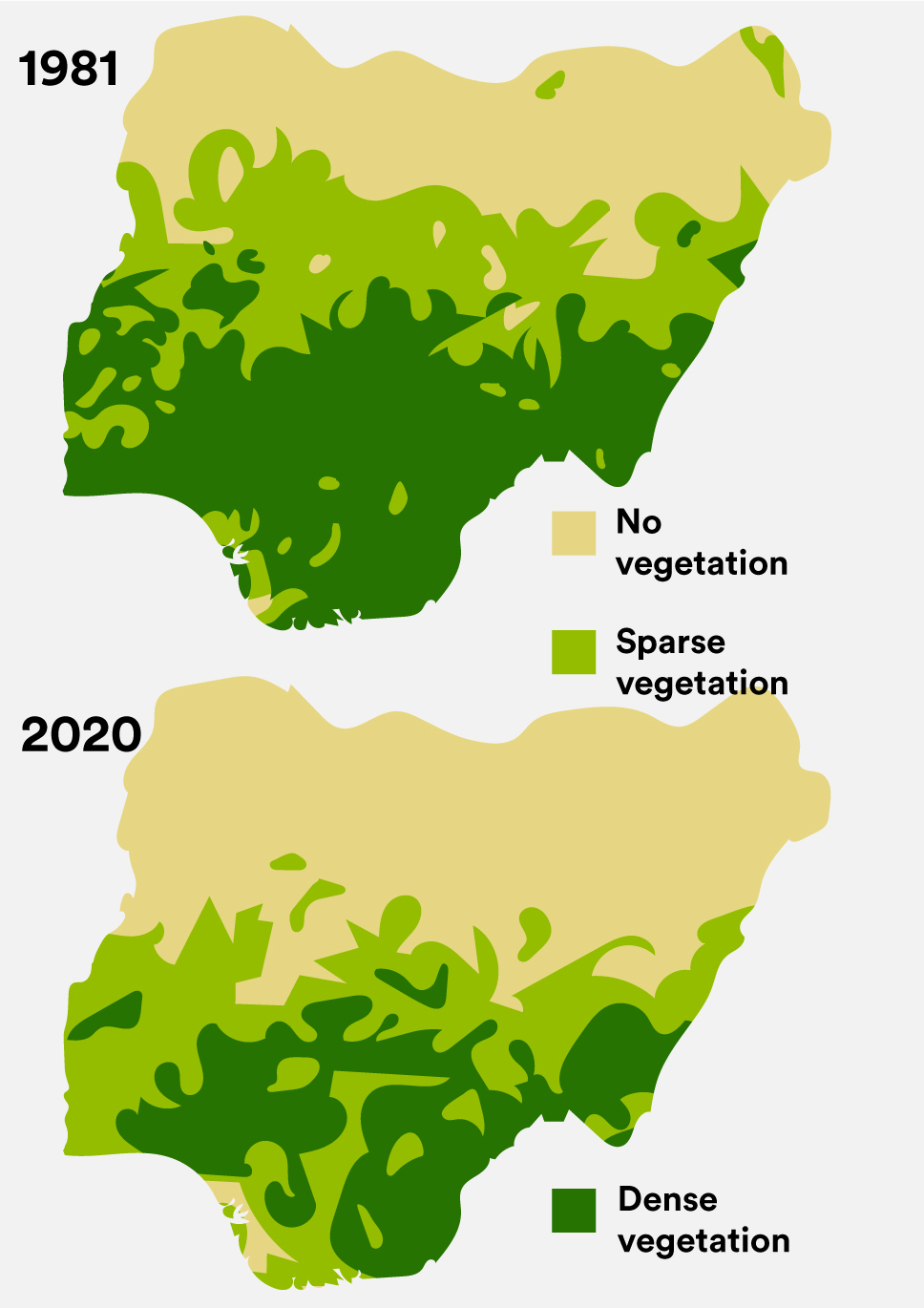
Deforestation 1981 - 2020

Nigeria is recognised for its ecological biodiversity. It is considered one of the richest biodiversity hotspots globally, significantly contributing to the country's economic prosperity. Historically, significant forest reservations have been established in Nigeria, representing 27% of the total forest cover and 10 per cent of the land area, approximately 96,518 square kilometres (37,266 sq mi). Two-thirds of these reserves are in the savanna region, while the remaining percentages are in tropical forest zones in the south, freshwater swamps, and mangroves in the coastal region.

Nigeria's Forest Reserves consist of 1,160 designated areas covering approximately 107,527.02 square kilometres (41,516.41 sq mi). These reserves constitute around 11% of Nigeria's total landmass, spread across 362 local government areas. Notably, Lewechi forest reserve in Okigwe, Imo state, is the smallest, covering an area of 0.47 square kilometres (0.18 sq mi), whereas Borgu forest reserve in New Bussa, Niger state, is the largest, encompassing an area of 3,786.58 square kilometres (1,462.01 sq mi).

In 1960, the country had eight national parks, 445 forest reserves, twelve strictly nature reserves, and 28 game reserves. Despite conservation efforts, these areas have experienced high levels of human activities leading to deforestation, encroachment, and degradation. The eight national parks are Gumpti Park, Kainji Lake Park, Cross River Park, Old Oyo Park, Chad Basin Park, Yankari Park, Kamuku Park, and Okomu Park. The deforestation problem, compounded by human activity, has severely impacted Nigeria's rich biodiversity, including 864 bird species, 285 mammal species, 203 reptile species, 117 amphibian species, 775 fish species, and 4,715 species of higher plants. The population of rare Cross River gorillas has notably decreased due to poaching and habitat destruction. Deforestation has caused economic challenges, affecting agricultural yield and livelihoods. Environmental issues, including deforestation, have led to conflicts and even the execution of environmental activists such as Ken Saro-Wiwa, a Nobel Peace Prize nominee.

== Deforestation overview ==
Deforestation refers to the removal of vegetation without simultaneous replanting for various economic or social purposes. This process has multifaceted adverse effects on the natural environment, contributing to soil erosion, loss of biodiversity, wildlife reduction, land degradation, and desertification. Furthermore, deforestation significantly impacts agriculture, leading to conflict and affecting overall quality of life. These primary forests encompass areas with no visible signs of human activities. Notably, deforestation intensifies carbon dioxide circulation, contributing to greenhouse gas emissions.

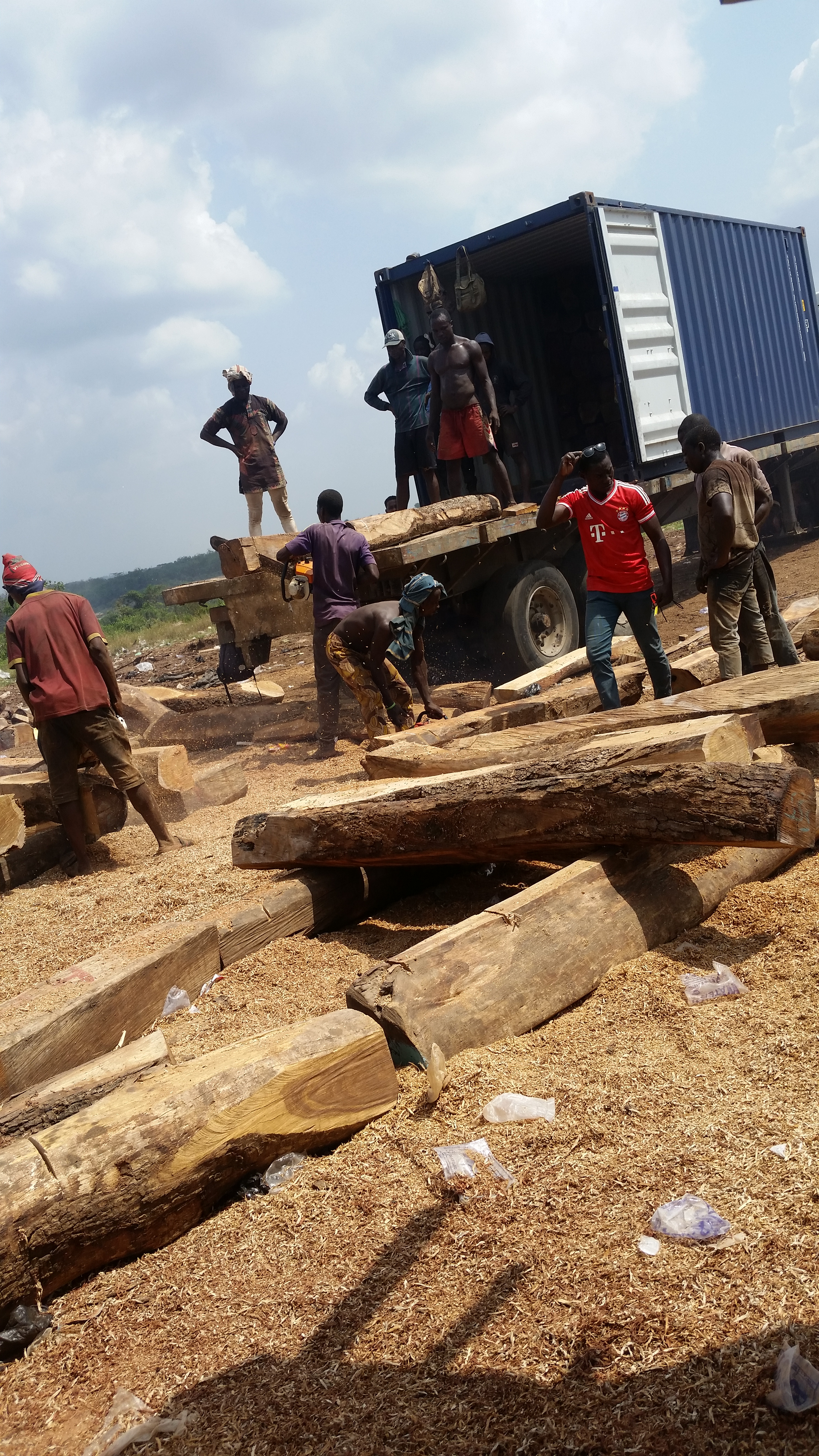
Men loading squared logs in a truck in Nigeria

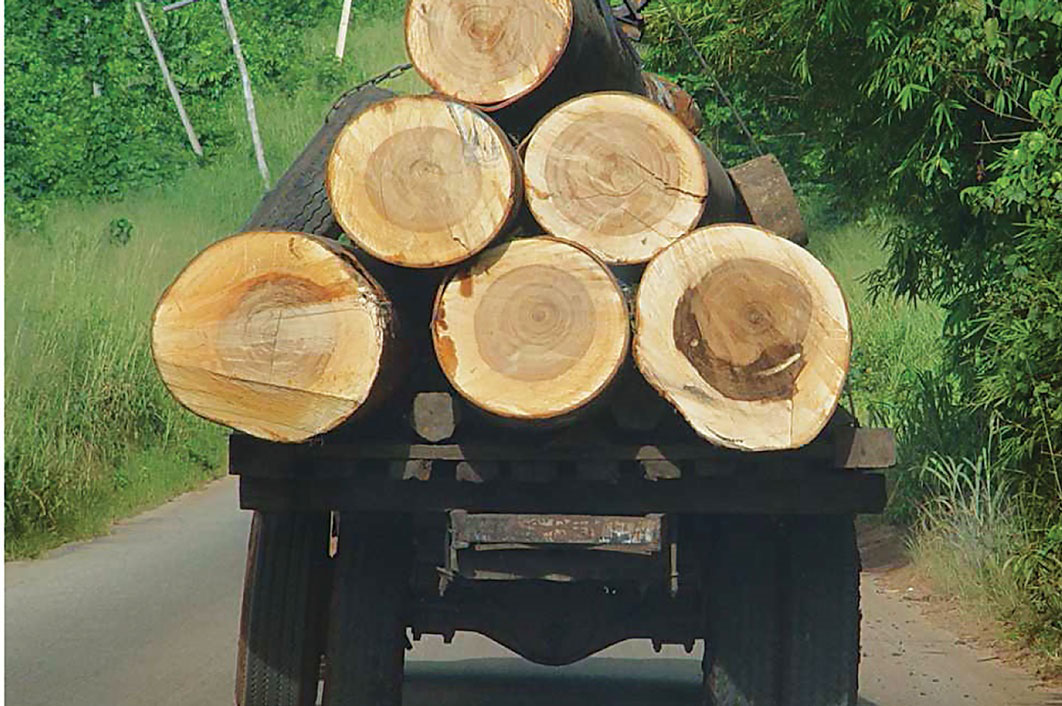
Human causes of forest depletion: Felled trees

The Food and Agriculture Organization outlines criteria for sustainable forest management, such as; maintaining forest resources, biodiversity, health, and productive, protective, and socio-economic functions. These benchmarks are presently not met, posing potential detrimental effects if not addressed promptly.

From 2001 to 2022, Nigeria lost 1.25 Mha of tree cover, and experienced a deforestation rate of 163 Kha/year, the 15th fastest rate among nations. (The fastest being Brazil with 1,700 Kha/year)

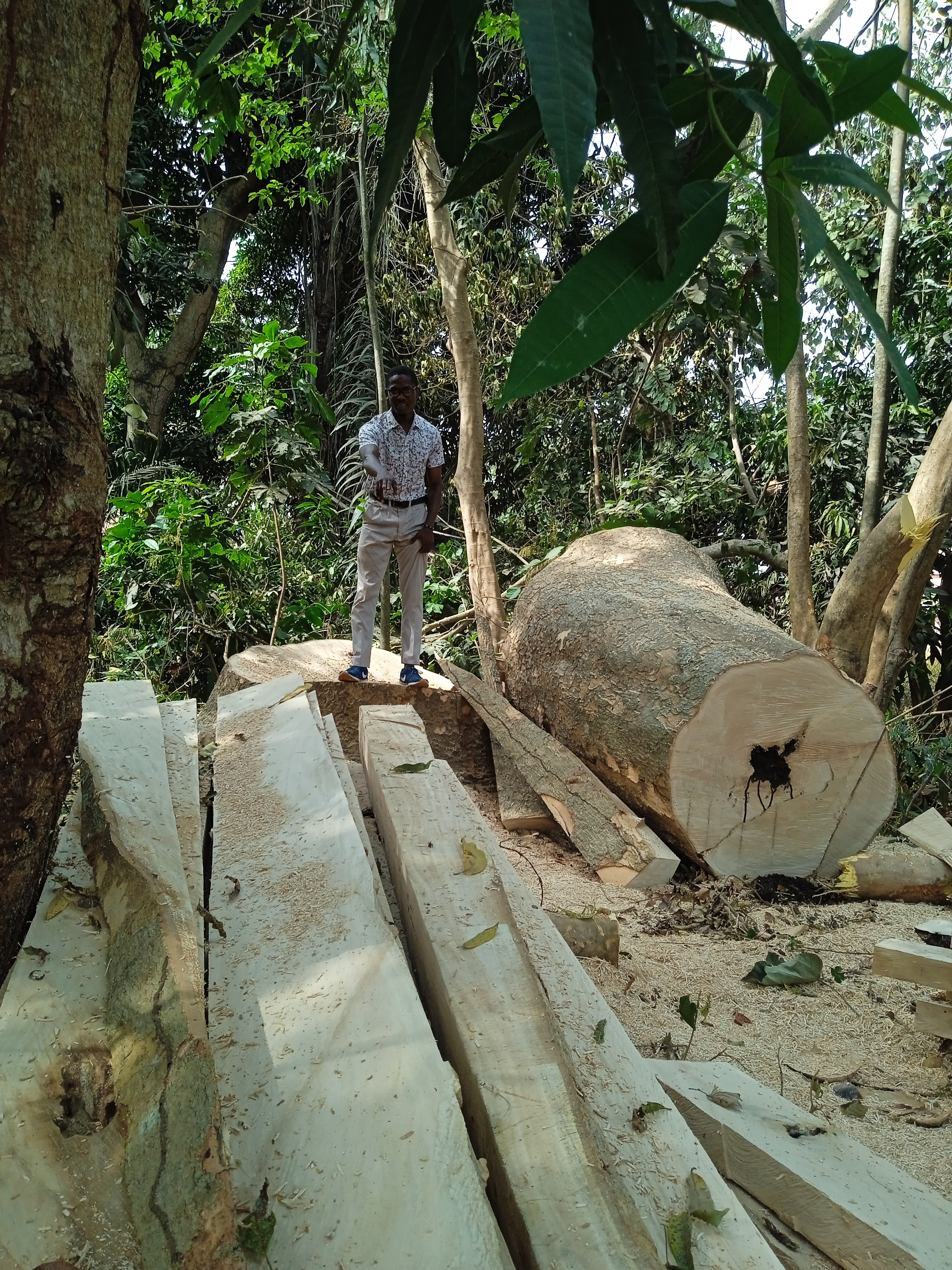
Loss of Ancient Tree Species through Logging

The nation has lost 12% of its relative tree cover since 2000, accounting for 0.27% of the global total.

The country faces a massive risk of desertification due to extensive deforestation, which compromises once-fertile land. Studies from 1901 to 2005 found a temperature increase of 1.1°C in Nigeria, surpassing the global average of 0.74°C. During the same period, rainfall decreased by 81mm, with significant changes occurring in the 1970s.

The alarmingly rapid deforestation is attributed to the demand for fuel wood. Approximately 90% of the Nigerian population depends on kerosene for cooking, but due to its unavailability or high cost, 60% resort to using fuel wood. Rural areas observe higher usage, influencing livelihoods, while poverty remains a significant driver of deforestation.

Despite an increase in national parks and reserves, only 3.6% of Nigeria is protected under the International Union for Conservation of Nature categories I-V. Inadequate forest management by the Department of Forestry since the 1970s is a significant contributor to the deteriorating ecosystem. The country lacks decisive measures to combat illegal logging and lower the deforestation rate.

Deforestation jeopardises various environmental, economic, and societal facets, potentially leading to forest degradation, characterised by extreme soil erosion, loss of nutrients, and extinction of plant and animal species. Additionally, this environmental issue is further aggravated by climate change, potentially causing an upsurge in diseases, pests, and forest fires. The foremost cause, considered an indirect driver of deforestation, is the most significant. While Nigeria's forests make a substantial contribution to the GDP, diligent policies to regulate human activities within forests and preserve this valuable resource are lacking. This disconnect between fiscal policies and the value of forest resources, coupled with inadequate incentives for alternatives, leads to issues like high fossil fuel prices, unemployment, and underfunded forest management initiatives.

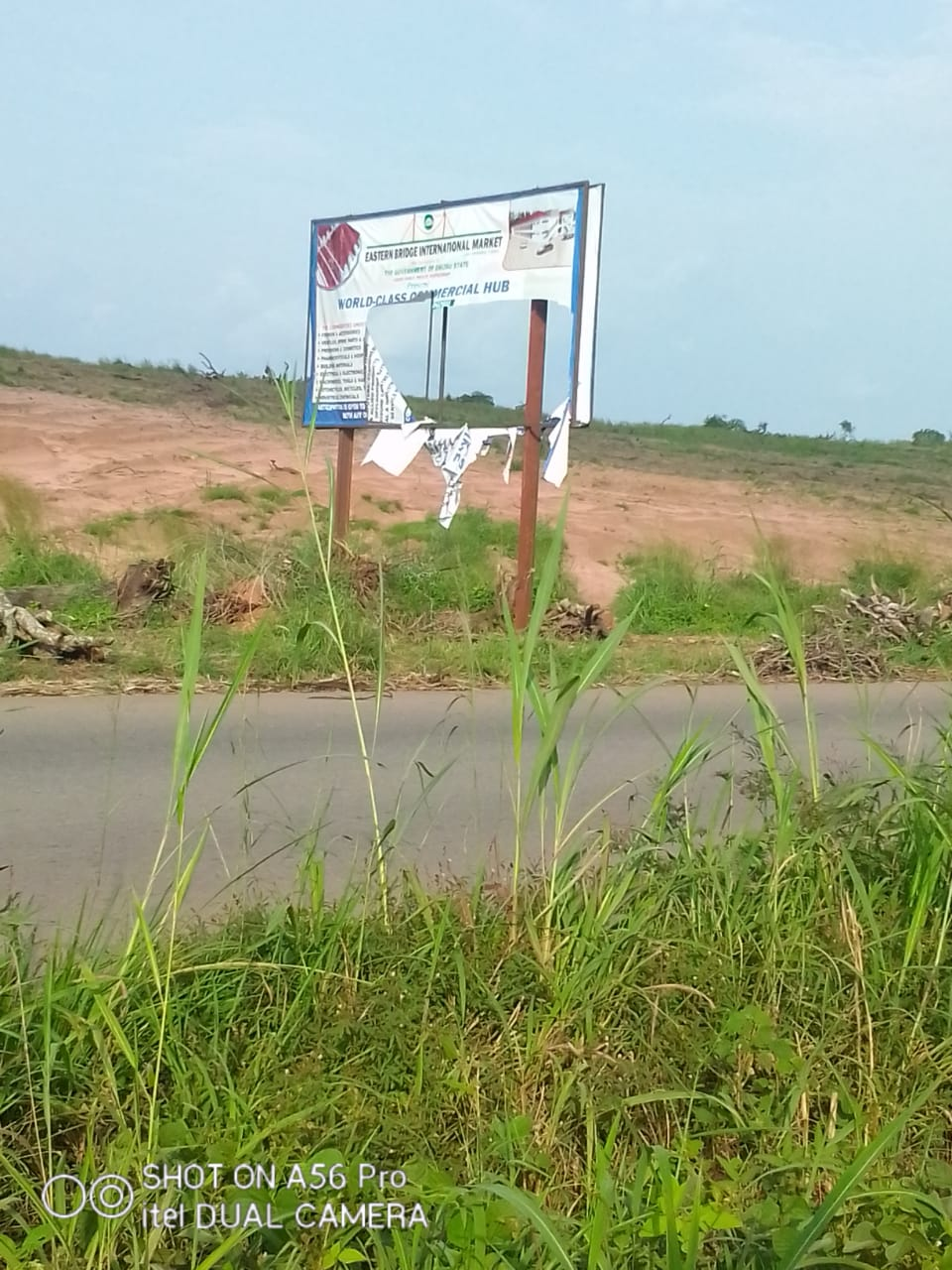
Field Survey October 2023

== Several elements contribute to deforestation in Nigeria ==
About 60% of tropical forest clearing in Nigeria is for agricultural settlement. Shifting agriculture, involving underbrushing, felling, and slash-and-burn methods, leads to permanent destruction of rainforests, responsible for approximately half of tropical deforestation. Over a century, Nigeria's land area decreased from 60 million hectares to 9.6 million hectares, marking significant forest loss due to infrastructural expansions and industrial setups. These developments often encroach upon forests, impacting local livelihoods without assured benefits or compensation.

Deforestation in Nigeria is influenced by various factors, including climate change (albeit a minor fraction), logging, biotic agents, and manual deforestation by individuals and organisations. Primary drivers include agriculture expansion, logging, legal and illegal felling and urbanisation. For instance, recent findings highlighted a 99.2-hectare land allocation for an international market in Enugu State, leading to deforestation at Opi in Nsukka Local Government Area (Field Survey, October 2023).

== Impact of logging ==
The impact of logging on deforestation involves; cutting down trees, processing them locally, and transporting them via trucks, contributing significantly to global deforestation.

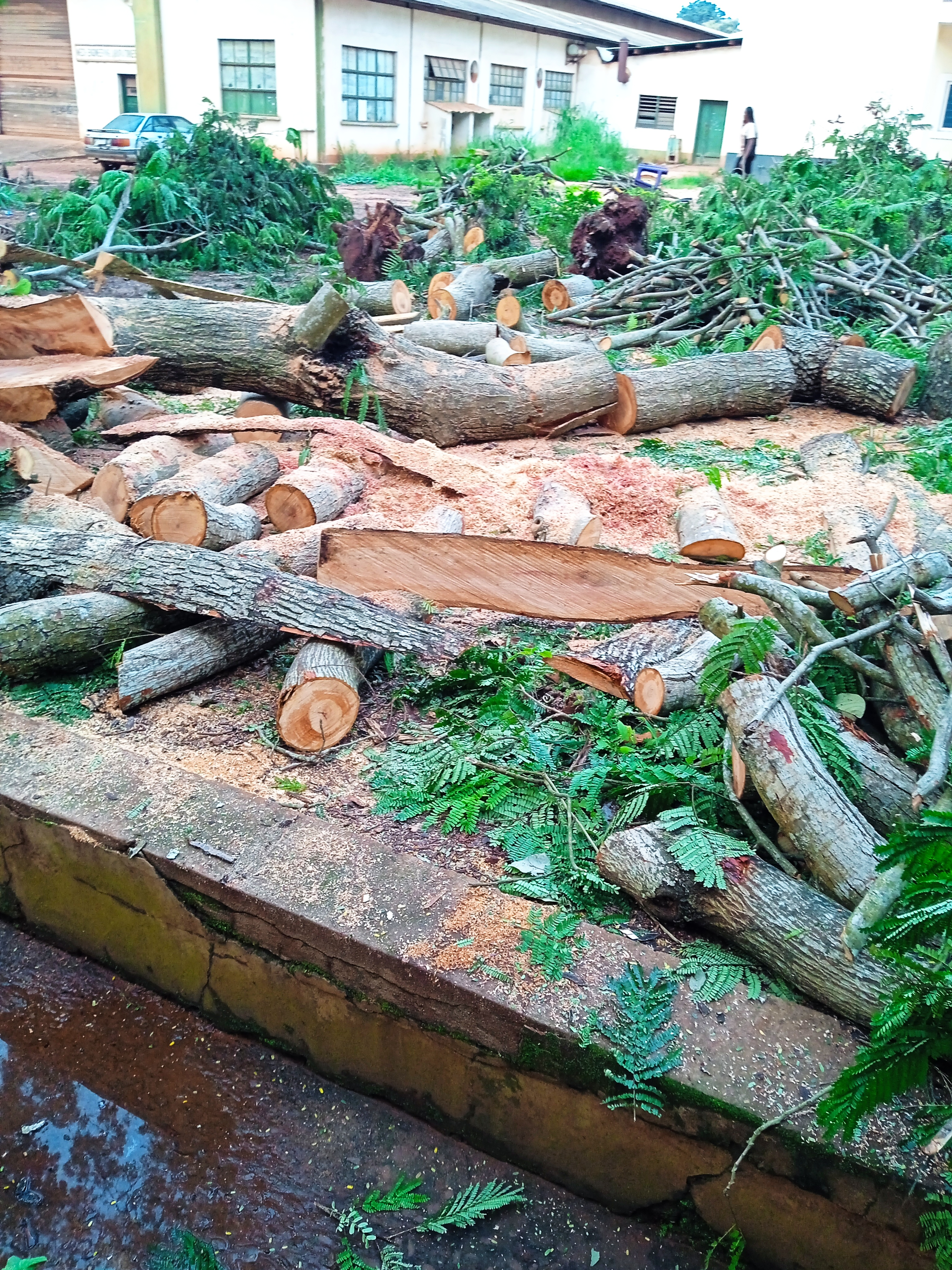
Tree logging, deforestation effect

When companies engage in commercial logging, it leads to deforestation. Logging industries provide wood varieties like ebony, mahogany, teak, and meranti to the global market, leading to a depletion of forests. Transporting logs involves two methods: water transportation in swampy areas and road transportation where equipment can move smoothly.

Various actors engage in wood logging in Nigeria, including the World Trade Organization (WTO), multilateral banks (World Bank, Inter-American Development Bank, Asian Development Bank, African Development Bank), international financial institutions (International Monetary Fund), transnational and national businesses, development agencies, and governments. These actors play various roles but also have detrimental effects on indigenous populations, underdeveloped nations, and the global community.

Global asymmetries in economic development contribute to a divide between industrialised and underdeveloped nations. Multilateral institutions pressure local governments to settle foreign obligations, leading to environmental damage and increased poverty. Development plans emphasise export-oriented exploitation of natural resources, focusing on wood as a profitable business, neglecting other forest dimensions like biodiversity, food, or medicinal plants.

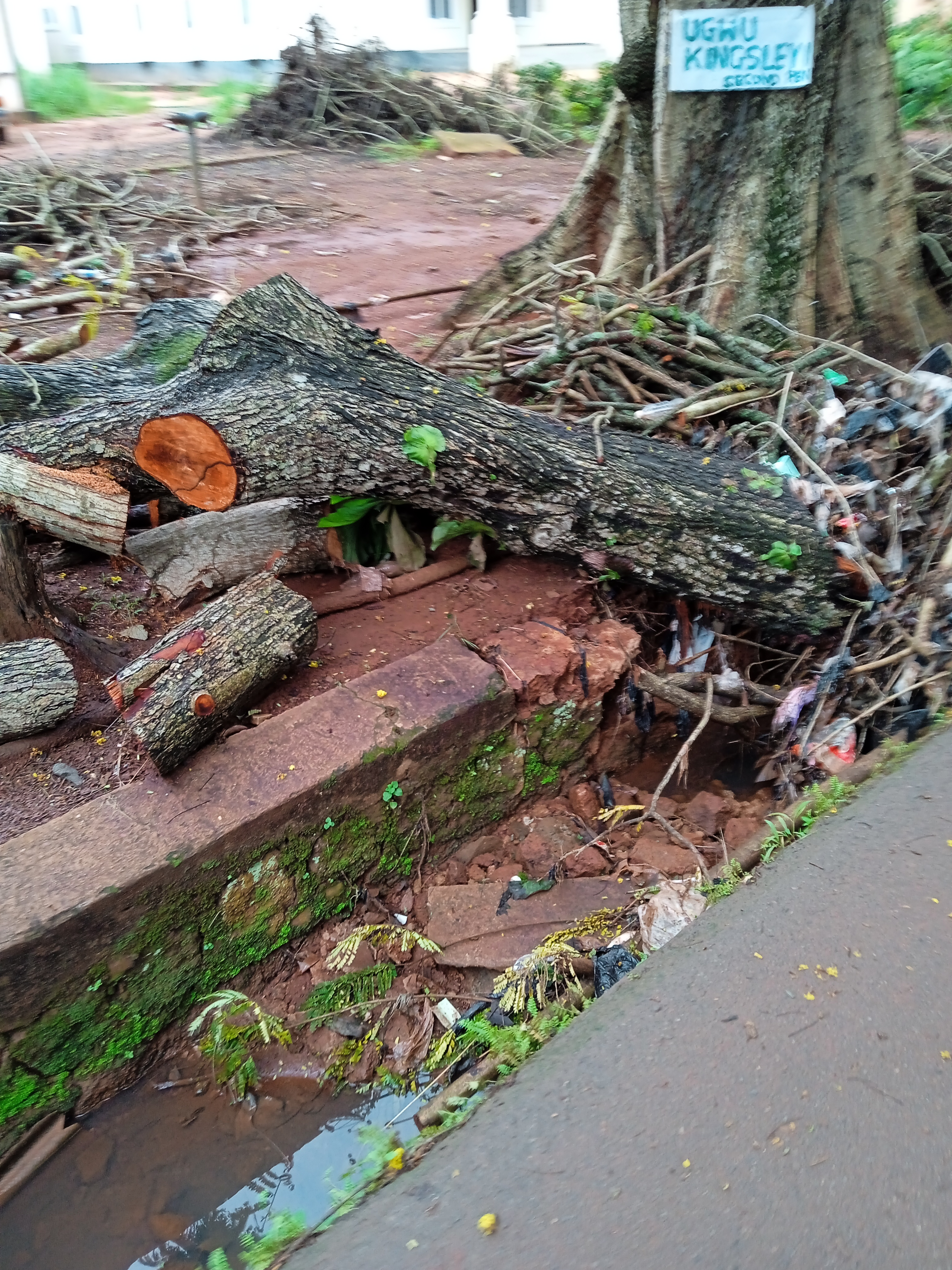
Gutter blockage by logged wood

National governments support logging operations despite local inhabitants' presence in the forests due to vested interests of the ruling class and transnational corporations. Selective logging has a modest impact compared to incidental damage caused by the machinery used, which significantly alters the forest ecosystem, inhibiting tree regeneration and threatening biodiversity.

Deforestation in Nigeria has significant environmental consequences, including soil erosion, declining biodiversity, altered climate, increased carbon emissions, population declines, and increased risks of landslides and flooding. Ecosystems are disrupted, limiting access to clean water.

Addressing deforestation by protecting forests and promoting sustainable practices is crucial to mitigate its adverse impacts on the environment and ensure long-term environmental health.

=== Agriculture ===
The growing population in Nigeria has intensified the demand for food, leading to annual destruction of large forest areas by bush burning or logging to create farmland. Shifting cultivation, a farming practice where farmers relocate in search of fertile land, accelerates land deterioration and forces exploration of new forest borders, thereby increasing deforestation.

In Nigeria, disputes between local farmers and Fulani herdsmen during the 1960s led to property destruction, displacement, and livelihood disruption. Grazing practices are a significant contributor to deforestation, and addressing these crises requires governance, justice, equity, and adherence to rule of law.

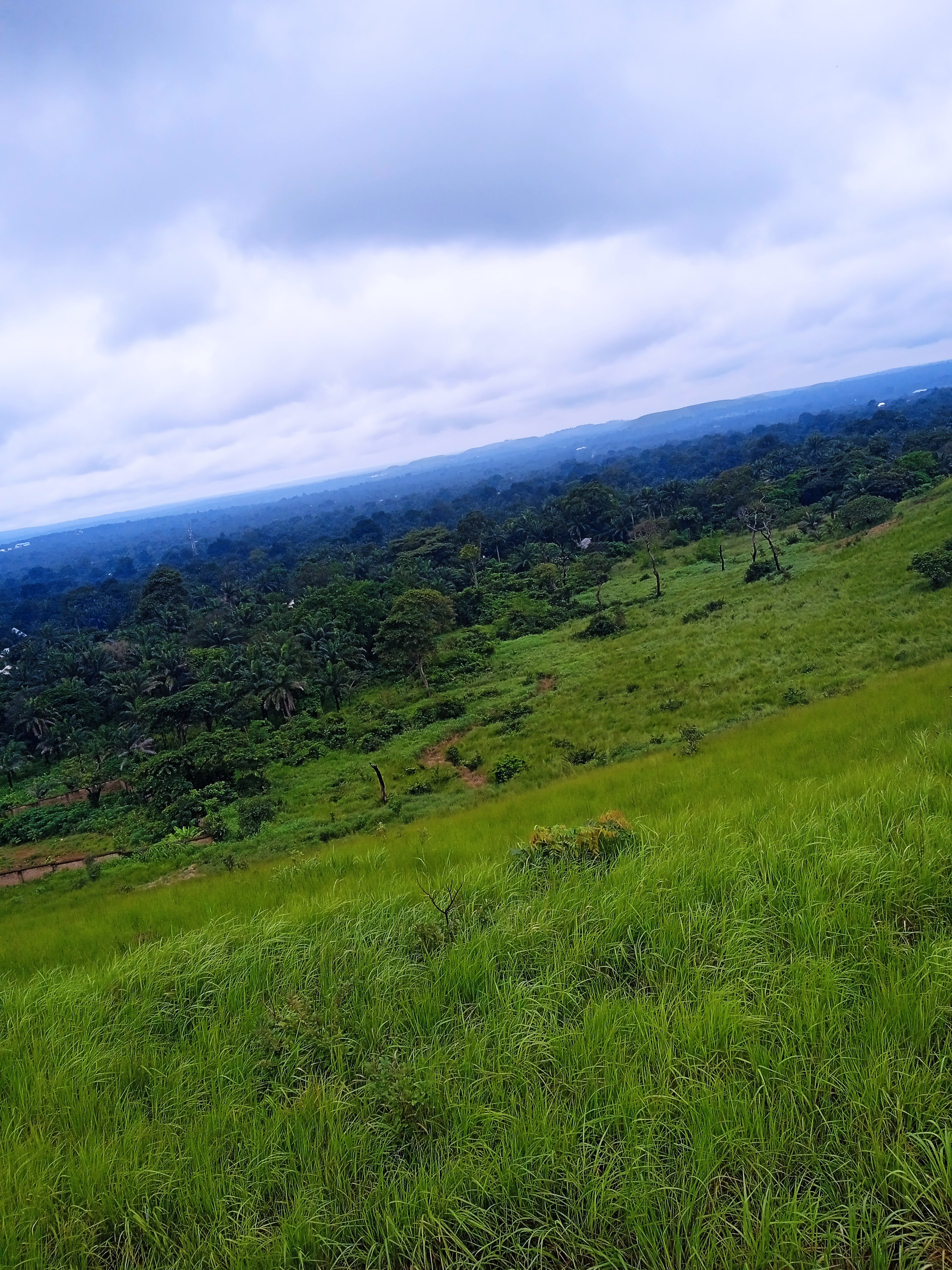
Region not deforested. Maintaining the biodiversity

==== Small ruminant farming ====
Small ruminant farming involves raising animals like sheep and goats for their meat, milk, and other products. While a sustainable practice for food production, it can contribute to deforestation in various ways.

Reducing the impact of small ruminant farming on deforestation can be achieved through sustainable grazing methods, such as rotating grazing areas and using less destructive methods. Moreover, improving the efficiency of animal feed production using sustainable sources can help mitigate the impact on forests. Raising awareness of the environmental impacts among farmers can encourage the adoption of more sustainable practices.

=== Petroleum exploration ===
Petroleum exploration and exploitation in the southern part of Nigeria have had significant impacts on the swamp forest ecosystem and mangrove forests in the Niger Delta region. According to the Department of Petroleum Resources, approximately 419 oil spills have occurred on land, resulting in the loss of an estimated 5 to 10 per cent of the mangrove forest area. The inadequate coordination of pipelines and environmental concerns has left many in the region unemployed, with limited farming opportunities and a diminished forest reserve to rely on.

The expectation that fuel provision would sustain communities has been affected by conflicts arising from oil theft, pitting indigenous groups against the government. These conflicts, coupled with oil spills, have also compromised the quality of drinking water, posing a threat to public health.

The oil spills in the Niger Delta region have resulted in deforestation, ecological degradation, and the disruption of ecosystem services and natural resources. This spillage has notably impacted agricultural practices and biodiversity across a variety of ecosystems, encompassing land, swamp, and offshore regions. The region, comprising a diverse population of forty ethnic groups and 250 languages, grapples with persistent oil spills and misuse of crude oil, significantly affecting both the environment and their quality of life. This diverse populace is deeply concerned about the environmental consequences within the Niger Delta region (NDRN).

=== Fuelwood burning ===
According to the World Meteorological Organization, Nigeria is a leading producer of Liquefied petroleum gas (LPG) and has a large reserve of natural gas. However, the high cost of cooking gas and kerosene has caused the majority of rural and semi-urban households to resort to using wood for cooking. Over 120 million Nigerians rely on firewood and charcoal for their cooking needs, according to the International Energy Agency. Research by the World Wildlife Fund (WWF) estimates that wood used for cooking accounts for about half of the trees that are removed illegally from forests globally, with a majority coming from developing countries such as Nigeria. Nigeria heavily relies on wood as a source of fuel for cooking and heating, especially in rural areas. The demand for fuelwood and charcoal leads to excessive tree cutting, contributing to deforestation. Enugu State is experiencing deforestation due to the demand for firewood.

=== Urban growth ===
As a result of the high influx of people to urban areas, there has been a need for rapid development and the provision of necessary social amenities like roads, airports, railways, bridges, and schools in these parts of the country, which are now threats to the forests as trees and vegetation are cut down or burned to achieve these development plans.

For instance, most first-generation and second-generation universities like the University of Calabar were in highly forested areas, but the need to establish these schools made way for the destruction of these areas. It is noted that Nigeria is blessed with biological resources, but due to human activities, the country is losing its nature.

=== Corruption ===
Corruption poses a significant challenge in Nigeria and plays a major role in facilitating illegal logging by both companies and forest officials. These illegal logging activities contribute to deforestation, causing significant environmental and economic consequences. An area equivalent to the size of a football field is illegally cleared every two seconds.

The illegal trade of timber and its products results in substantial economic losses and environmental damages. The increasing demand for wood products has made the forestry sector lucrative, thereby promoting the prevalence of illegal logging. This destructive practice poses the primary threat to the existing tree population. Corruption is also pervasive within government institutions, leading to the exploitation of forest resources for personal gain and power. Unfortunately, these actions prioritise short-term economic benefits without considering the long-term consequences.

The lack of integrity within the judiciary system contributes to the continuation of illegal logging, further exacerbating the issue of deforestation. Nigeria has faced threats of human health and even the health of its forests as a result of bad governance. It is noticed that the leaders are careless about the welfare state of their citizens and do not care about the natural resources given to us for human advancement and development.

==== Governmental corruption ====
Corrupt government officials are often paid off by illegal logging companies to make them ignore their activities. Do not support corrupt politicians and systems. Reduction of corruption will go a long way towards reducing deforestation overall. In many poorer countries, the lack of police presence and law enforcement means that illegal deforestation often goes unpunished and unnoticed for many years, even though it is destroying the country's economy and resource wealth. For example, 70 per cent of Indonesia's timber exports come from illegal logging. Besides leaving behind extensive damage to the Rainforest, the country is also losing around US$3.7 billion every year in lost revenue. Thus, illegal logging does more harm than good to the country.

=== Population growth ===
The rapid growth of the population and the resulting demographic pressure have had a significant impact on deforestation in Nigeria. As the most populous country in Africa, Nigeria currently has a population of 162.5 million people. This demographic situation becomes a pressing issue when combined with high levels of poverty, as approximately 70 per cent (105 million) of Nigerians live below the poverty line.

The consequences of overpopulation are evident in the increased construction of residential and public areas. This extensive urbanisation leads to the disturbance of soil, making it more vulnerable to erosion and flooding. The United Nations Environmental Programme (UNEP) has highlighted that Africans are experiencing deforestation at a rate twice that of the global average, underscoring the severity of the problem in Nigeria. The combination of population growth, poverty, and rapid urbanisation exacerbates deforestation in Nigeria, with detrimental consequences for the environment and communities. Efforts to address these challenges require a comprehensive approach that considers sustainable development and environmental conservation.

=== Grazing ===
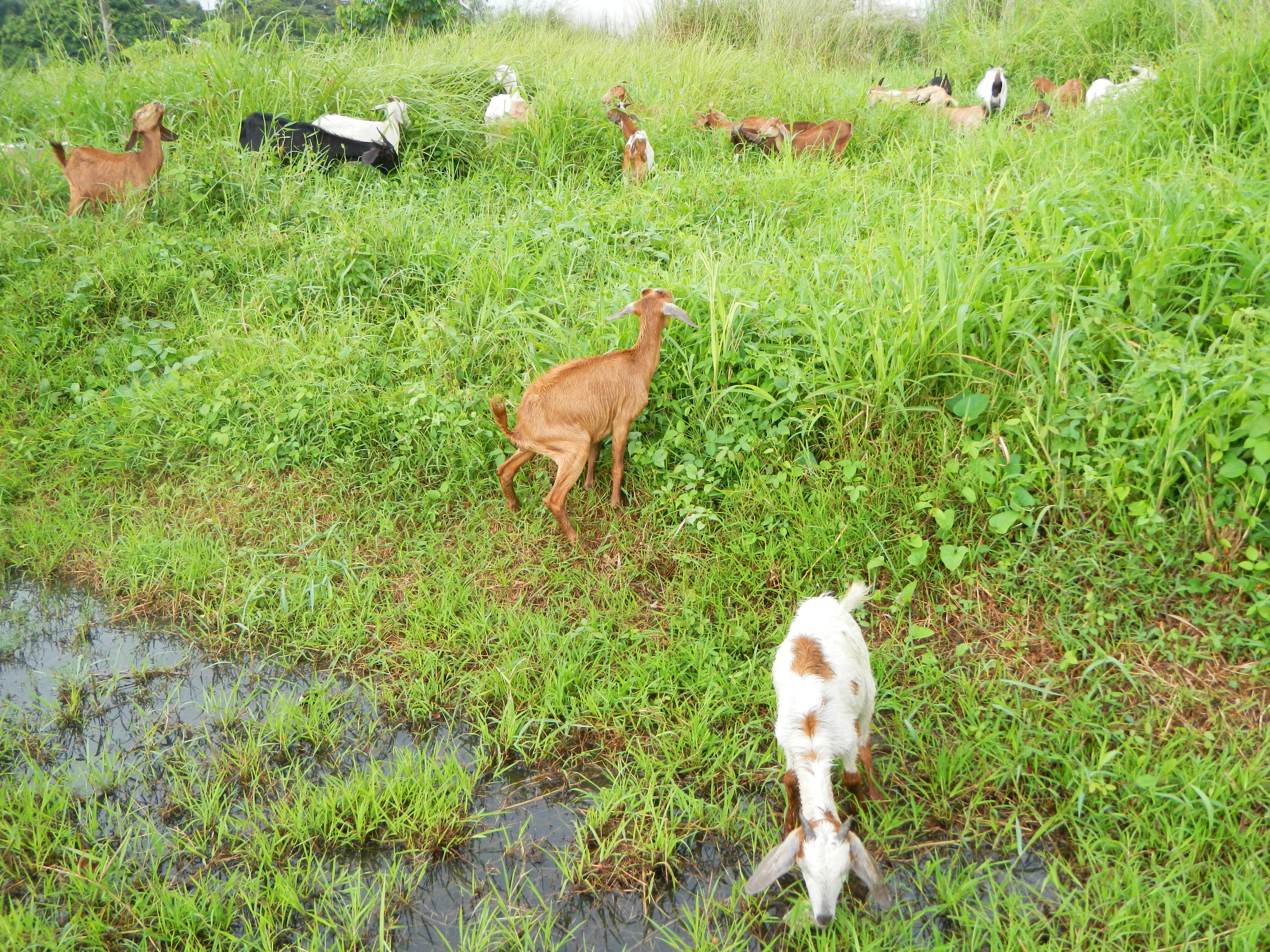
Grazing of animals as a form of deforestation

It is commonly known that excessive grazing promotes the vegetation of derived Savannah to gradually evolve into Sudan Savannah, given that these animals eat tree saplings, especially during the dry season when there isn't enough grass to sustain them. Furthermore, due to these animals' consumption of older tree branches and tree seedlings, deforestation occurs. Grazers, who rear cattle, cows, and other animals, contribute to this deforestation.

=== Fire ===
Although forest fires have been linked to naturally occurring phenomena like lightning and volcanoes, people are the primary cause of forest fires. Because it is moist for the majority of the year, the Rainforest is significantly more resistant to fire than the Savannah, however it is extremely susceptible to wildfires during the dry season. The majority of the trees, including their seedlings, are killed when the Rainforest is continuously burned, resulting in grasslands.

However, due to their extremely thick bark, the shorter Savannah trees can withstand fire. For forestry and agricultural operations, fire is a tool for site preparation. It is employed to lessen the amount of underbrush and tree debris. Herdsmen light fires in order to provide their animals with new growth. Hunters may also use fire to evict wild animals. The impact of fire can be highly disastrous since tropical Rainforests, which include a wide diversity of trees, require a long time to restore themselves.

== Impact on affected regions ==
A study conducted from 2001 to 2020 by the Nigeria Deforestation Rates & Statistics identified Edo, Ondo, Cross River, Taraba, and Ogun states as the most affected regions. However, the rainforest country profile cited Kwara, Niger, Oyo, Ogun, and Edo as the most impacted states. Edo State experienced the most significant forest loss, reaching 268,000 hectares compared to the average loss of 28,200 hectares. Other affected areas in Nigeria include Delta, Kogi, Osun, Ekiti, Bayelsa, and Oyo states.

The extensive demand for cocoa and palm oils in Cross River and Ondo States has notably contributed to environmental degradation.

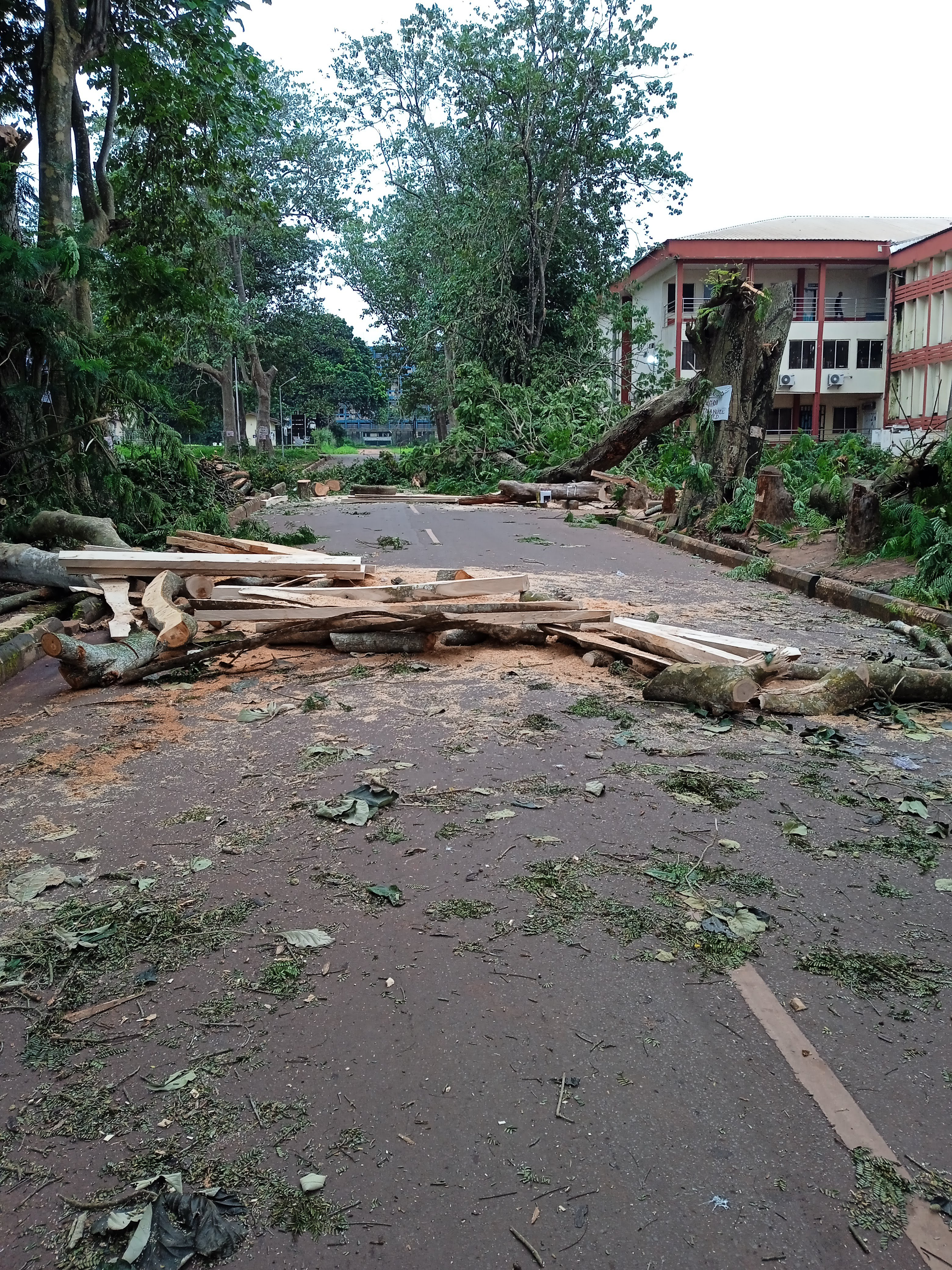
Tree logging causing road block

== Consequences of deforestation in Nigeria ==
Forests play a critical role in mitigating climate change by absorbing carbon dioxide (CO_{2}) from the atmosphere. Deforestation contributes to increased carbon emissions, exacerbating global warming and climate change. The reduction in trees that absorb carbon dioxide results in excess emissions, harming all species, including humans. They also maintain soil fertility and prevent erosion. Deforestation causes soil erosion, reducing agricultural productivity and causing soil loss and gullies. Aquatic trees' roots, critical for fish and other species, diminish due to deforestation.

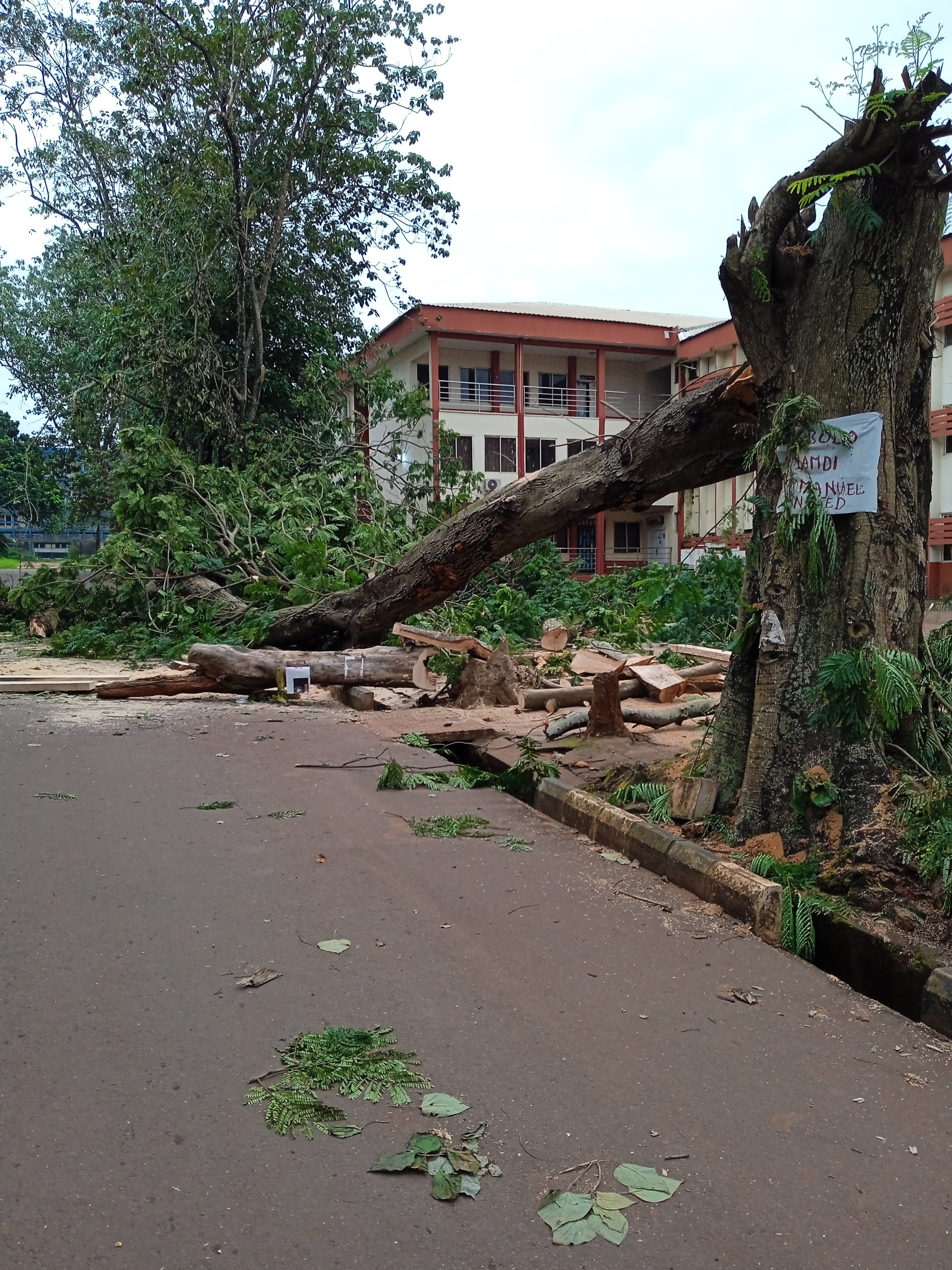
Logging of a healthy ancient tree leading to gutter destruction, pavement destruction and road blockage

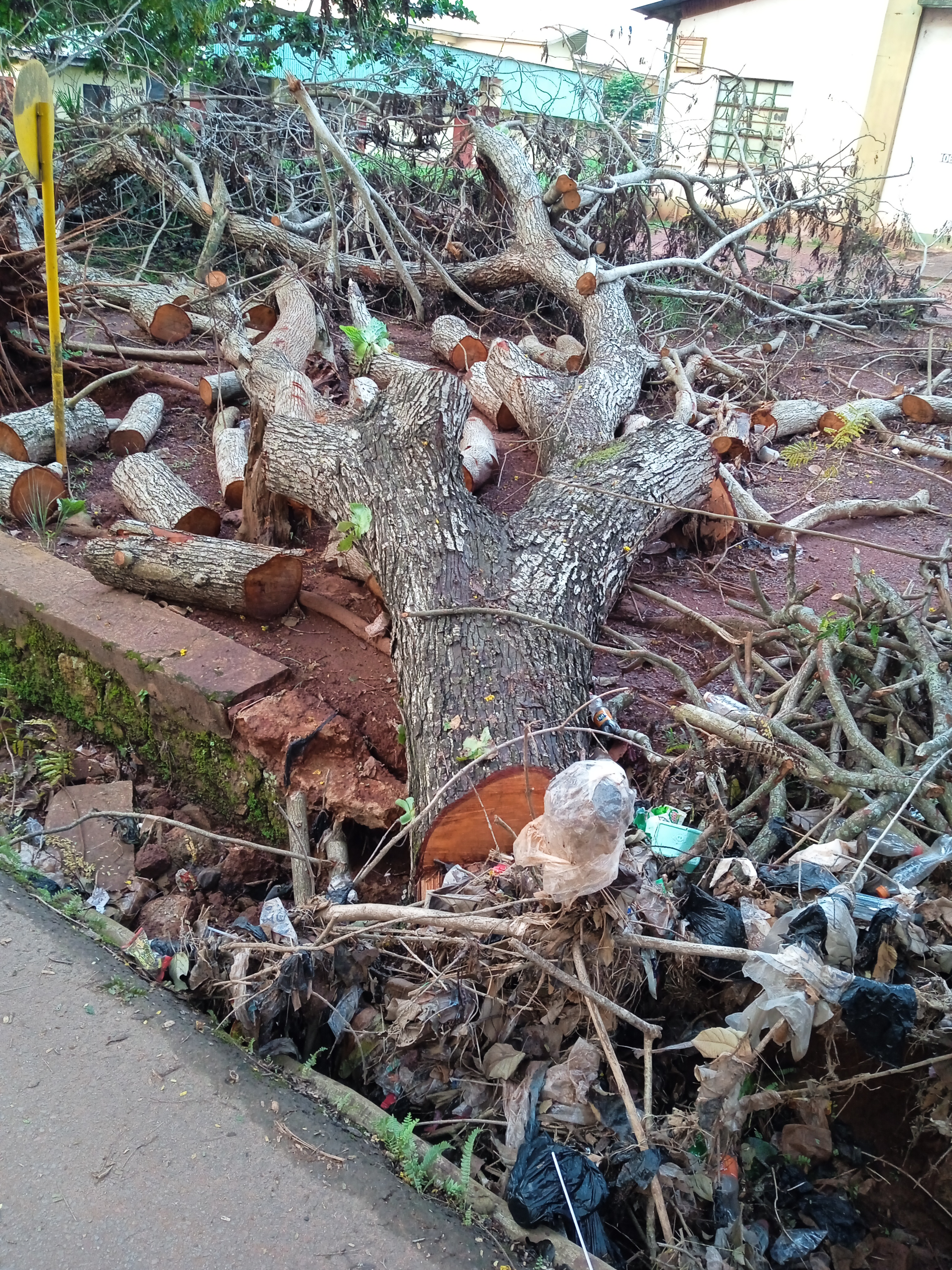
Town's drainage system damaged by careless logging

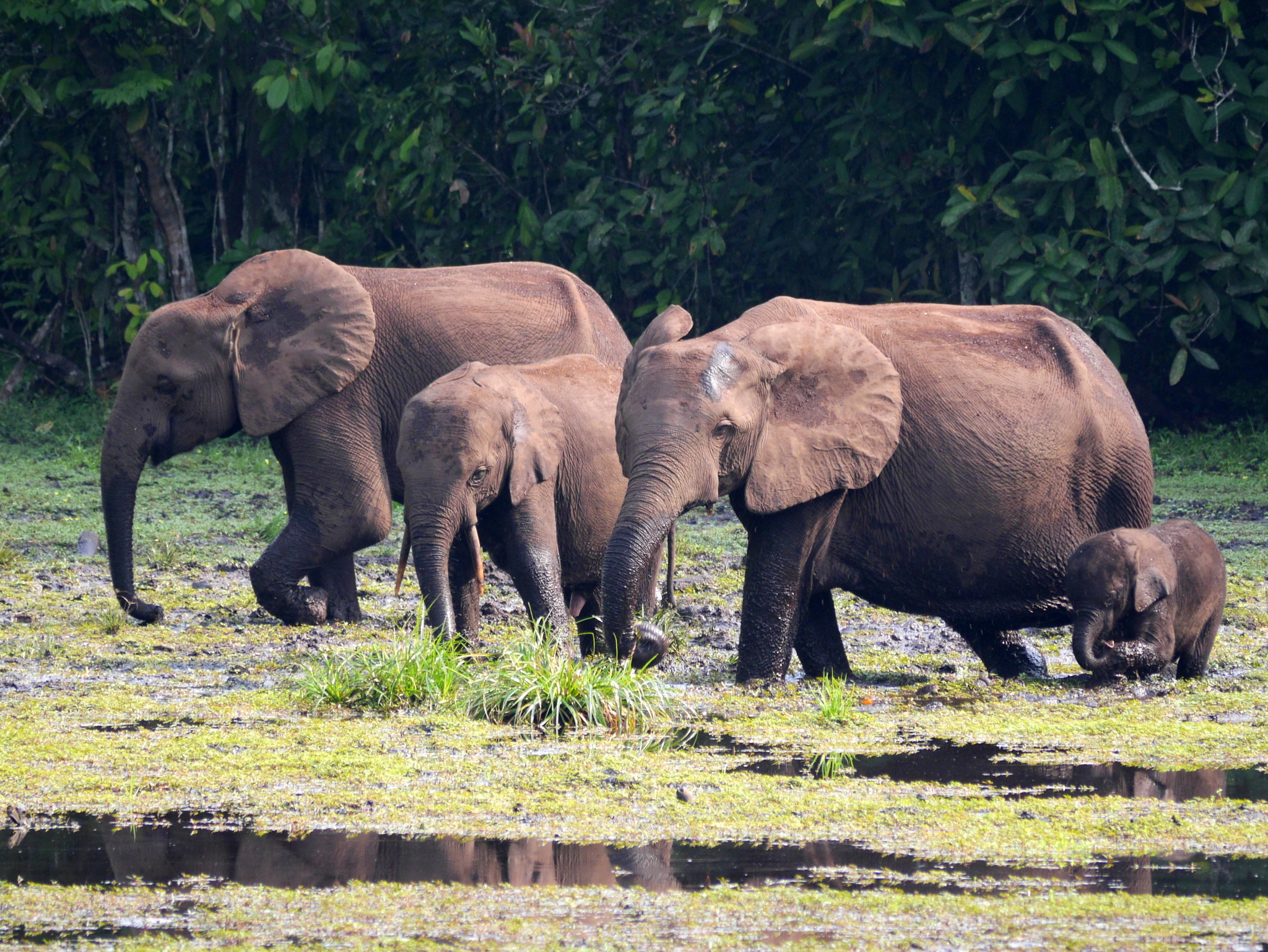
A group of African Forest Elephants, a species that could be threatened by deforestation in Nigeria.

Deforestation poses risks to Nigeria's paper industry, which heavily relies on wood pulp obtained from natural forests or plantations. Reduced wood supply can escalate production costs and quality degradation due to exposure to pests, diseases, fire, and pollution.

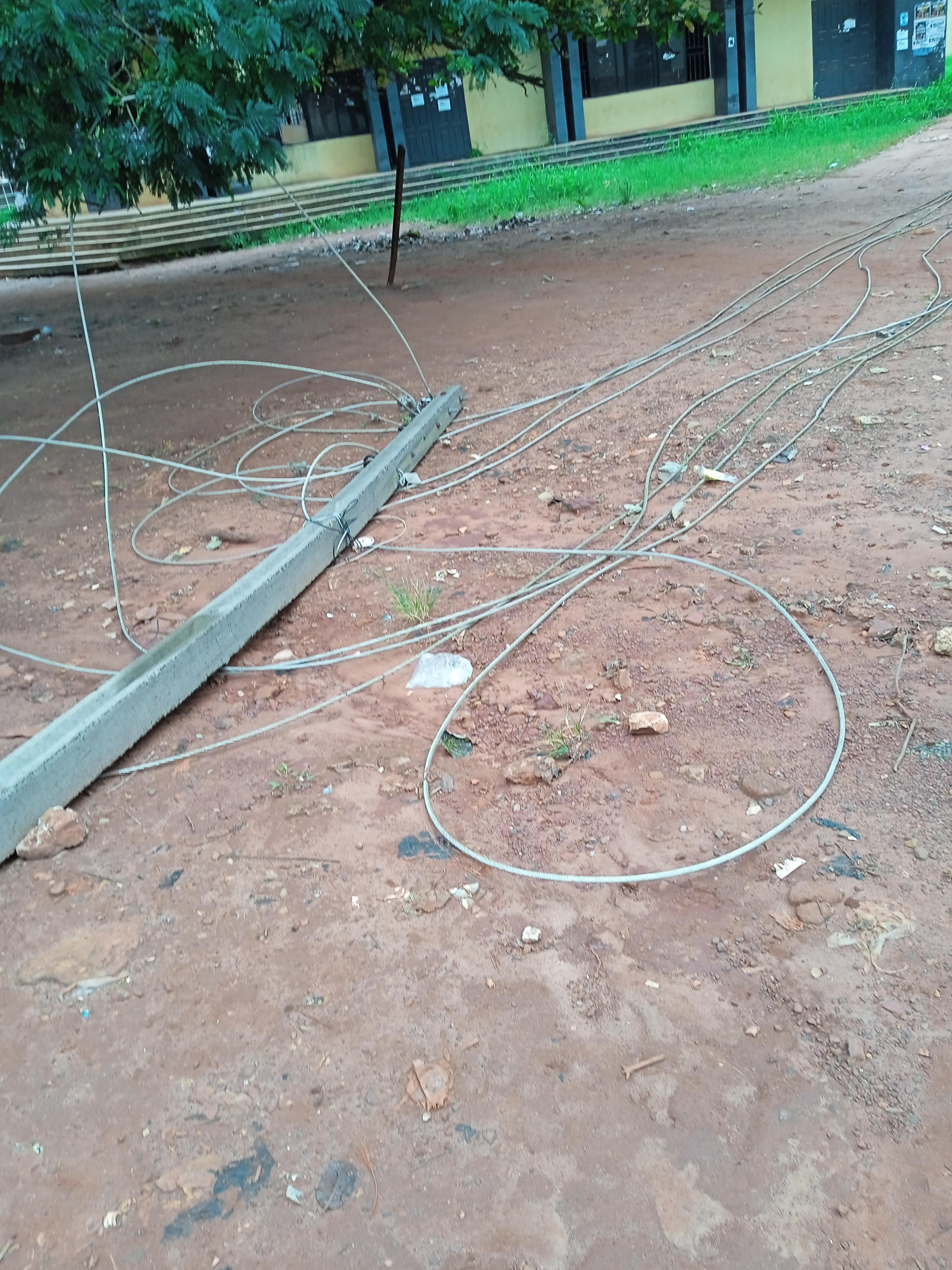
An electrical poll being damaged by logging

== Addressing deforestation in Nigeria ==
The demands on forests are varied, leading to a lack of coordinated strategies for forest protection. Indigenous communities seek to conserve forests for traditional needs, while others clear them for financial gains, causing conflict over the forest value accounting system. Developed countries shows interest in preserving Nigeria's tropical forests but provide inadequate financial support for forest conservation efforts. Issues like insufficient funding, seedling preservation challenges, and a long maturity period for trees hamper reforestation efforts. Farmers opt for quicker maturing crops, affecting the reforestation process.

Environmentalists propose deforestation alternatives but face challenges in implementation. Poverty forces individuals to clear forests for immediate food needs, with limited alternatives available. Government initiatives, while well-intended, often result in further deforestation, creating challenges in the effort to curb forest depletion. Numerous challenges, such as land use conflicts, financial constraints, public ignorance, and encroachment by herders, contribute to the rising deforestation rates in Nigeria.

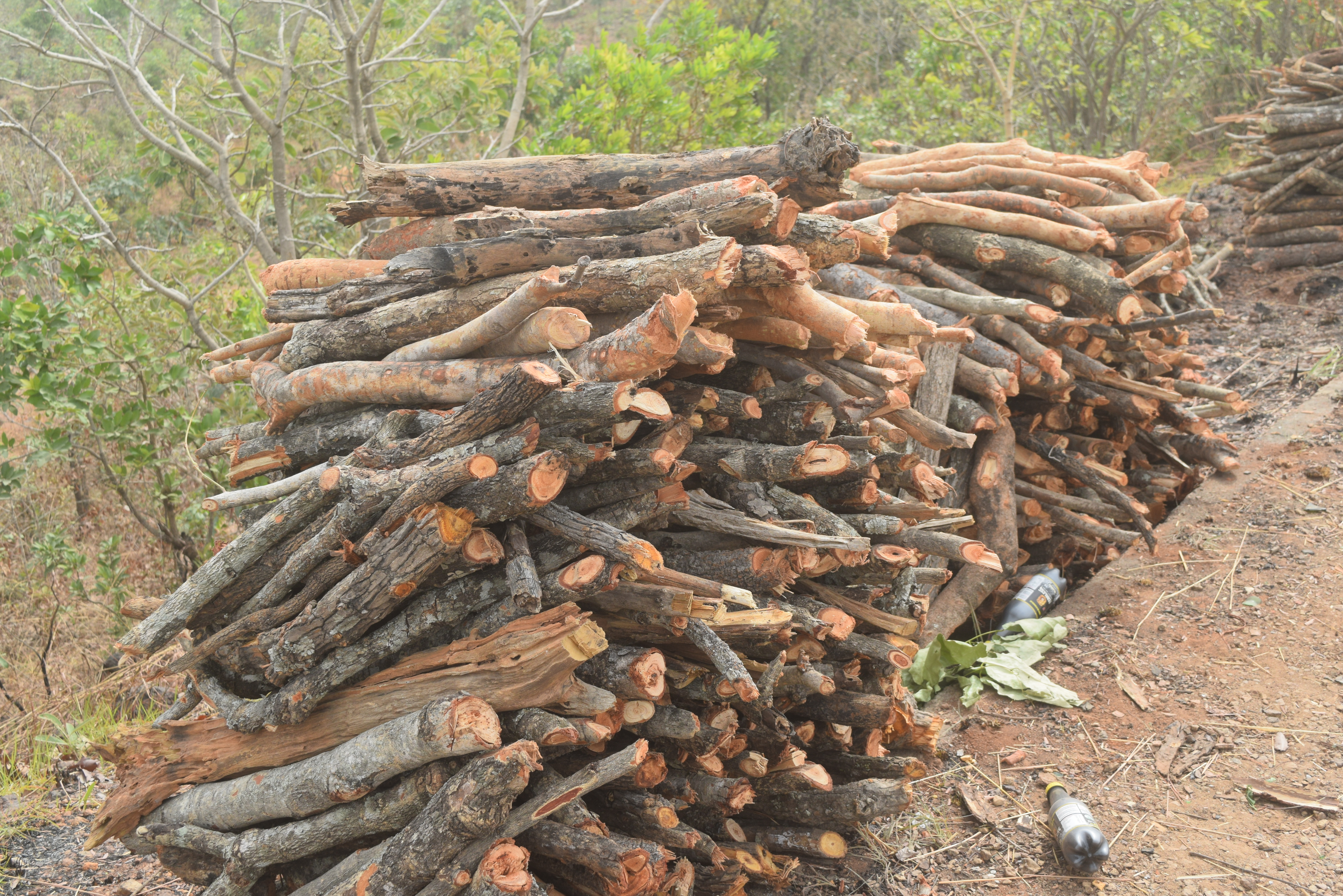
commercial fuelwood gathering for poverty reduction

=== Solutions ===
Several methods can combat deforestation in Nigeria:

- Implementing alley cropping, timber tree planting, mined area rehabilitation, and private sector tree planting to restore forest cover and ecosystem services.
- Enforcing government laws, promoting eco-forestry practices, and encouraging the use of alternative energy sources.
- Encouraging sustainable agricultural practices, preventing illegal logging, and promoting reduce, reuse, recycle principles for paper products.

Numerous international and local organisations such as Greenpeace, World Wildlife Fund, and others strive to protect forests through sustainable practices.

== Mitigating deforestation in Nigeria ==
Carbon sequestration and afforestation stand as promising solutions to combat deforestation in Nigeria and the broader global climate change crisis. Deforestation bears significant environmental, economic, and social consequences such as biodiversity loss, ecosystem disruption, and increased greenhouse gas emissions.

=== Carbon sequestration ===
Nigeria launched a National REDD+ Strategy (Reducing Emissions from Deforestation and Forest Degradation) to address deforestation and forest-related emissions.

== Initiatives and responses ==
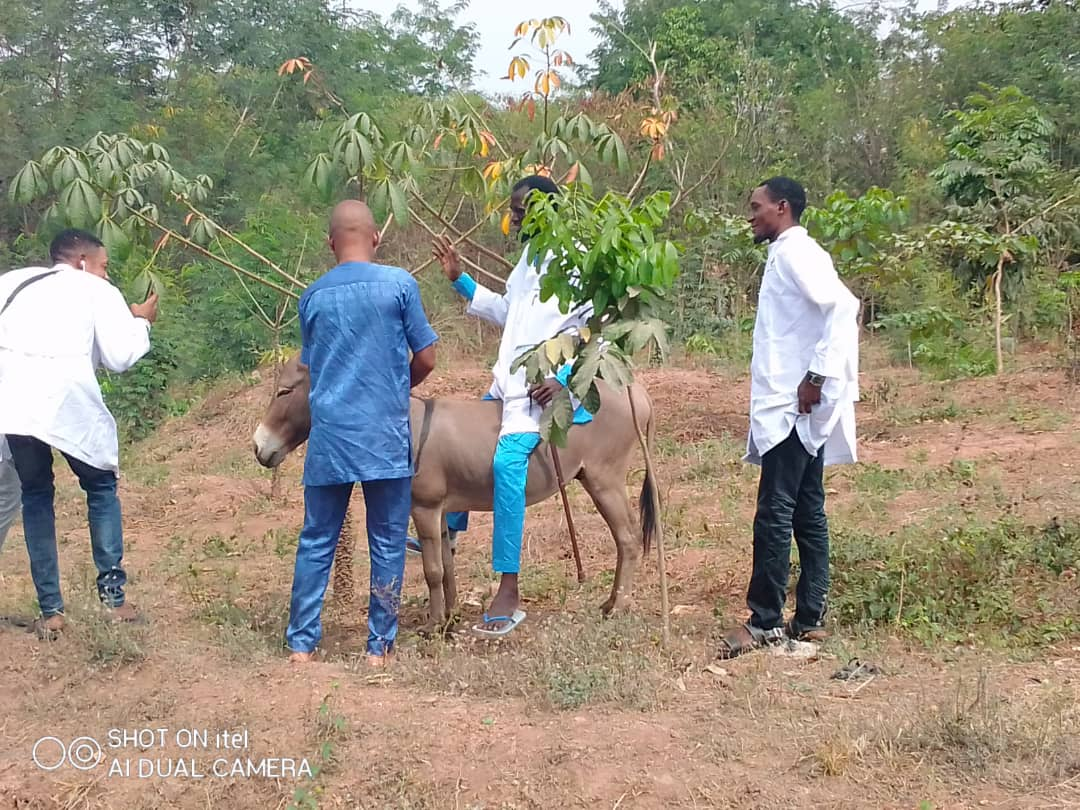
The Forestry Research Institute of Nigeria promotes learning about sustainable forestry practices in the country.

One approach, established in 2005, involved a collective effort by the Coalition for Rainforest Nations to reduce deforestation rates, subsequently lowering CO_{2} emissions. Participating developing countries would receive funding upon successfully reducing emissions, a concept aligned with REDD (Reducing emissions from deforestation and forest degradation). REDD, focusing on carbon credits, offers a financial incentive for more sustainable practices.

In 2017, the Federal government of Nigeria joined other West African countries in pledging to restore approximately 10 million acres of degraded land under the African Forest Landscape Restoration Initiative (AFR100) and the Bonn Challenge.

Kwara State's government proposed a plan to plant 2.5 million trees by 2047, aiming to combat deforestation in collaboration with the Nigerian Conservation Foundation. The initiative began with planting 15,000 seedlings in three communities within the state.

The non-governmental organisation Foliage (Fold for Liberal Age Charity Initiative) partnered with Ondo State in a pledge to plant one million trees across the state, under the theme, "Plant a tree, Save a life."

At a global level, in November 2021, Nigeria, along with over a hundred nations, pledged to halt deforestation by 2030, committing to raise $19.2 billion to stop and reverse tree loss.

Additionally, in 2021, Nigeria initiated the Reducing Emissions from Deforestation (REDD+) program, aiming to reduce deforestation in collaboration with the World Bank's Forest Carbon Sharing Facility.

== Tree cover extent and loss ==
Global Forest Watch publishes annual estimates of tree cover loss and 2000 tree cover extent derived from time-series analysis of Landsat satellite imagery in the Global Forest Change dataset. In this framework, tree cover refers to vegetation taller than 5 m (including natural forests and tree plantations), and tree cover loss is defined as the complete removal of tree cover canopy for a given year, regardless of cause.

For Nigeria, country statistics report cumulative tree cover loss of 1,438,632 ha (14,386.32 km^{2}) from 2001 to 2024 (about 14.3% of its 2000 tree cover area). For tree cover density greater than 30%, country statistics report a 2000 tree cover extent of 10,048,743 ha (100,487.43 km^{2}). The charts and table below display this data. In simple terms, the annual loss number is the area where tree cover disappeared in that year, and the extent number shows what remains of the 2000 tree cover baseline after subtracting cumulative loss. Forest regrowth is not included in the dataset.

Annual tree cover loss in Nigeria, 2001–2024. View chart definition.
Tree cover extent in 2000 minus cumulative tree cover loss in Nigeria, 2001–2024 (loss-only residual; does not account for gain). View chart definition.

Annual tree cover extent and loss
Year	Tree cover extent (km2) (Note: This residual measure does not include forest regrowth.)	Annual tree cover loss (km2)
2001	100,053.57	433.86
2002	99,730.11	323.46
2003	99,596.31	133.80
2004	99,449.86	146.45
2005	99,317.05	132.81
2006	99,055.38	261.67
2007	98,809.65	245.73
2008	98,534.94	274.71
2009	98,282.03	252.91
2010	97,954.21	327.82
2011	97,415.31	538.90
2012	97,065.59	349.72
2013	96,631.23	434.36
2014	95,944.86	686.37
2015	95,535.58	409.28
2016	94,813.69	721.89
2017	93,103.24	1,710.45
2018	91,905.02	1,198.22
2019	91,036.07	868.95
2020	90,044.07	992.00
2021	89,072.13	971.94
2022	88,010.23	1,061.90
2023	87,157.56	852.67
2024	86,101.11	1,056.45

== REDD+ forest reference emission levels and monitoring ==
Under the UNFCCC REDD+ framework, Nigeria has submitted multiple forest reference emission level (FREL) benchmarks. On the UNFCCC REDD+ Web Platform, the country’s 2018 subnational submission for Cross River State, 2019 national submission, and 2026 revised national submission are listed; the 2018 and 2019 FRELs are marked as assessed, while the 2026 submission is listed as under technical assessment. The platform lists the other Warsaw Framework elements—national strategy, safeguards, and a national forest monitoring system—as “not reported” for these submissions.

The first assessed FREL, submitted in 2018, was subnational in scope and covered only “reducing emissions from deforestation” in Cross River State, an area chosen because it contains about half of Nigeria’s remaining tropical high forest. Following the technical assessment and a modified submission, the assessed FREL was 8,922,467.1 t CO2 eq per year for the historical reference period 2000–2014. It included above-ground and below-ground biomass and reported CO2 only, while excluding deadwood, litter and soil organic carbon.

A second FREL, submitted in 2019, expanded coverage to the whole country and was assessed at 32,397,230 t CO2 eq per year for the historical reference period 2006–2016. The technical assessment reported that this national benchmark still covered only reducing emissions from deforestation, but expanded pool coverage to include deadwood and applied a country-specific forest definition of a minimum area of 0.5 hectares, minimum tree height of 3 metres and minimum canopy cover of 15%. In 2026, a revised national FREL was submitted and remains under technical assessment; that submission proposes a broader benchmark averaging 58,403,033 t CO2 eq per year for 2017–2021, adds forest degradation to deforestation, expands gases to include CH_{4} and N_{2}O, and states that activity-data assessment was carried out through Nigeria’s national forest monitoring system, although no standalone NFMS submission is listed on the REDD+ Web Platform.

== See also ==
- Environmental issues in the Niger Delta
- Nigeria gully erosion crisis
- Fuel wood utilization in Nigeria
- Wood industry in Nigeria
- Reforestation in Nigeria
- Bush burning in Nigeria
