= Wood industry in Nigeria =

Industry dealing with Wood in Nigeria

The Wood Industry in Nigeria have been undergoing a process of structural adjustment over the course of the last six decades, aligned with the growth and development unfolding within the economy.

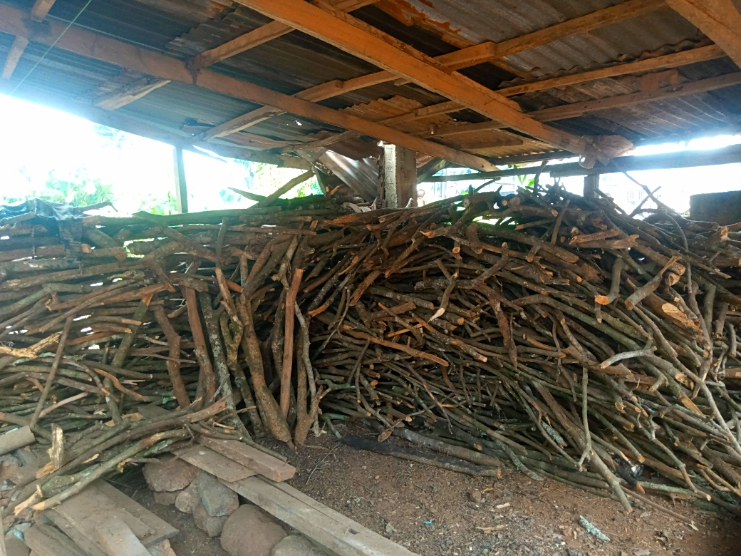
A local commercial firewood store

== History ==
The status of Nigeria as the foremost wood producer in Africa was underscored by an estimated annual harvest surpassing 100 million cubic meters in 1998.

== Production process ==
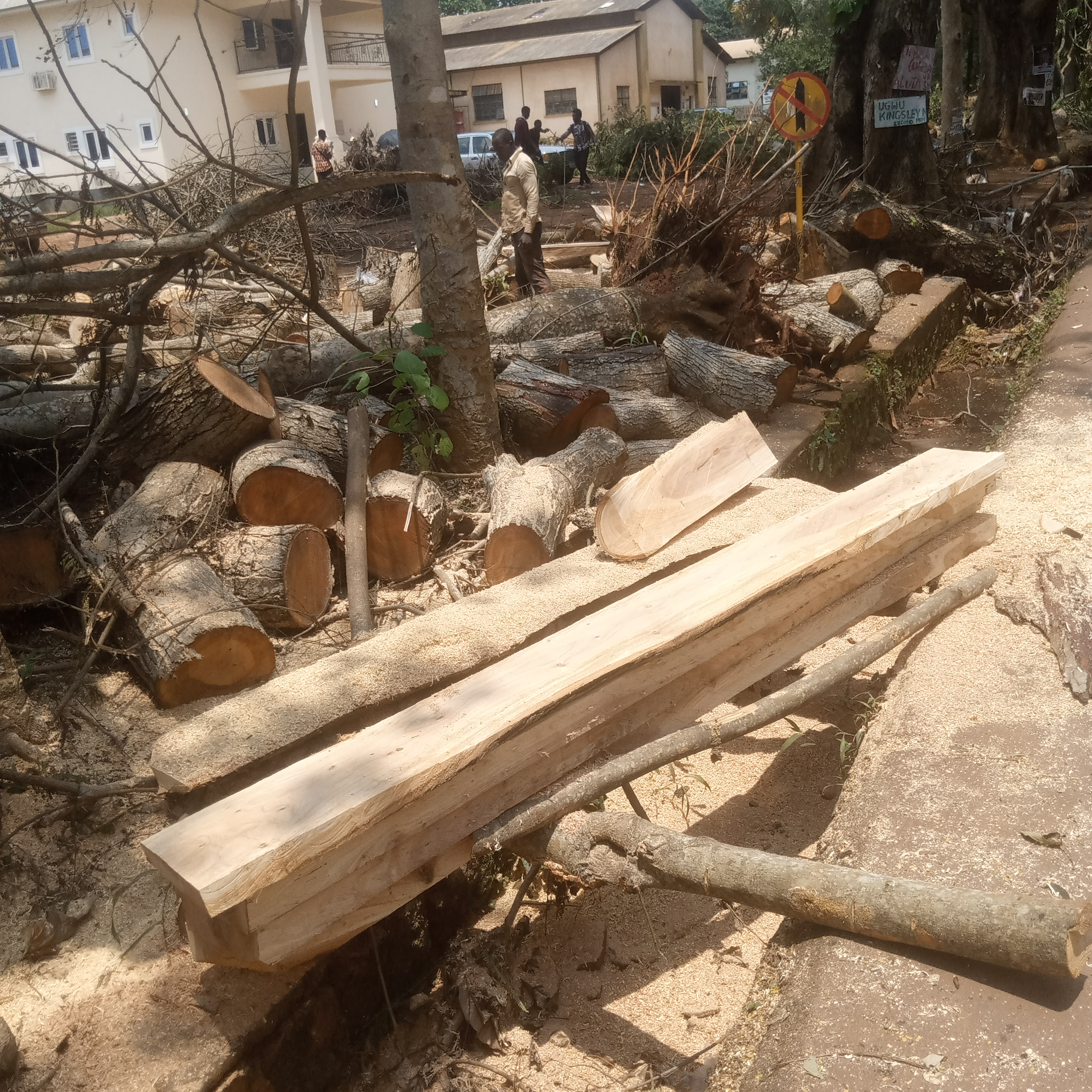
Planks made from a tree that has been cut down at UNN, Enugu Nigeria

Wood sourced from the wood industry in Nigeria undergoes processing within a range of wood processing sectors, encompassing furniture manufacturing, sawmill industries, plywood mills industries, pulp and paper facilities, as well as particleboard mills. As of 2010, workers are typically not given any safety training.

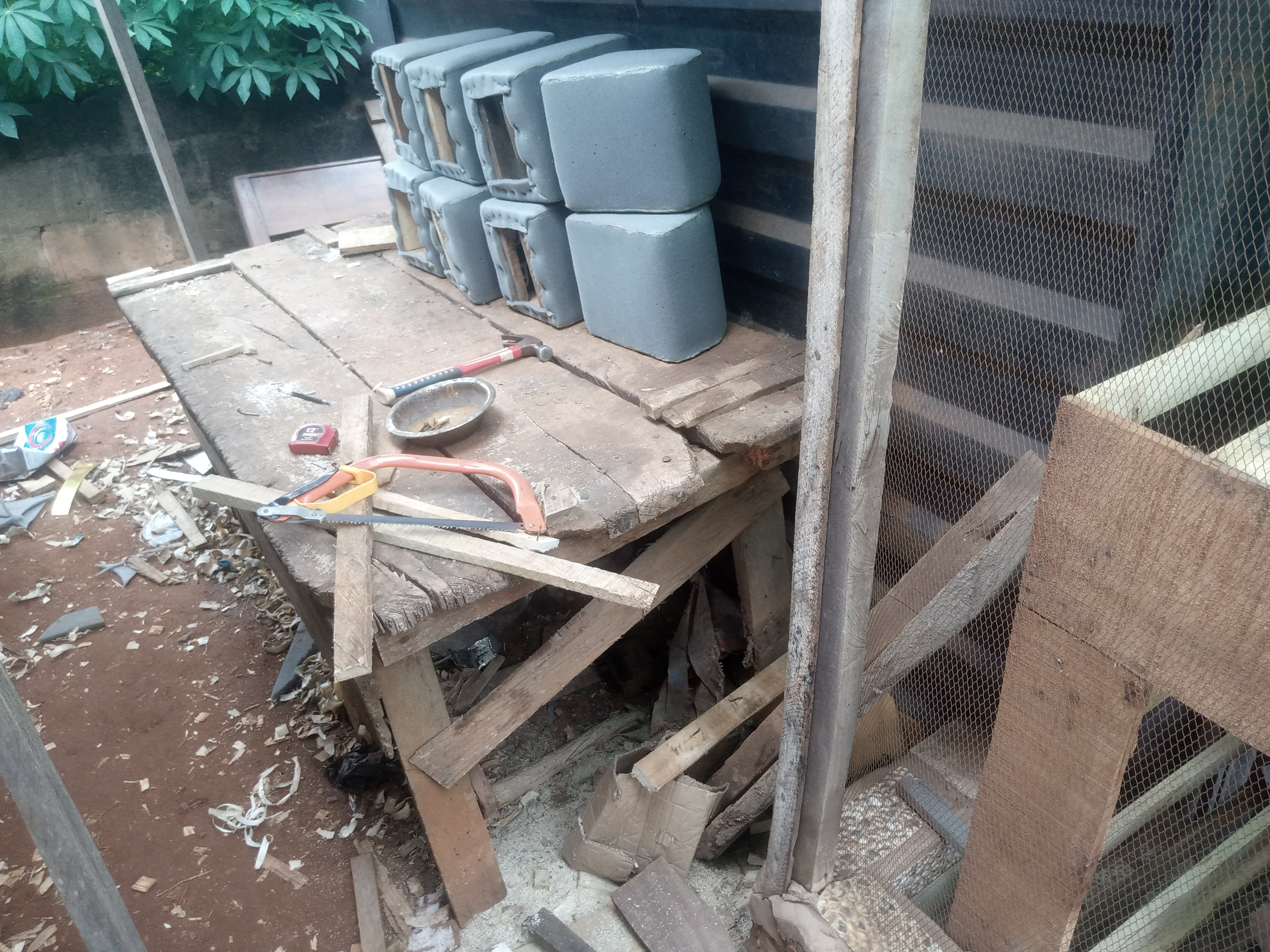
A Carpentry workshop in Nsukka

- Plywood Milling Industries - In 2019, Akwa Ibom State government commissioned some ply mill industries in Akwa Ibom like Lim Timber & Plywood Industry.
- Pulp and Paper Facilities - The increased demand for paper products in Nigeria can be attributed to population growth.

=== Paper pulp industry ===
Paper mills in Nigeria have faced various challenges over the years, such as lack of maintenance, obsolete equipment, inadequate power supply, and scarcity of raw materials. As a result, they have either become moribund or are operating at low capacity.

Nigeria relies heavily on imported paper products.

== Common wood usage in Nigeria ==
- Wood for Architectural Purpose - The utilization of these wood species is prevalent among a majority of individuals in the construction of shops, residences, shrines, animal enclosures, and yam storage structures. Currently, the impact of modernization has led to a gradual substitution of traditional architectural wood applications with contemporary building materials such as cement blocks, bricks, aluminum roofing sheets, window glass, and steel rods.
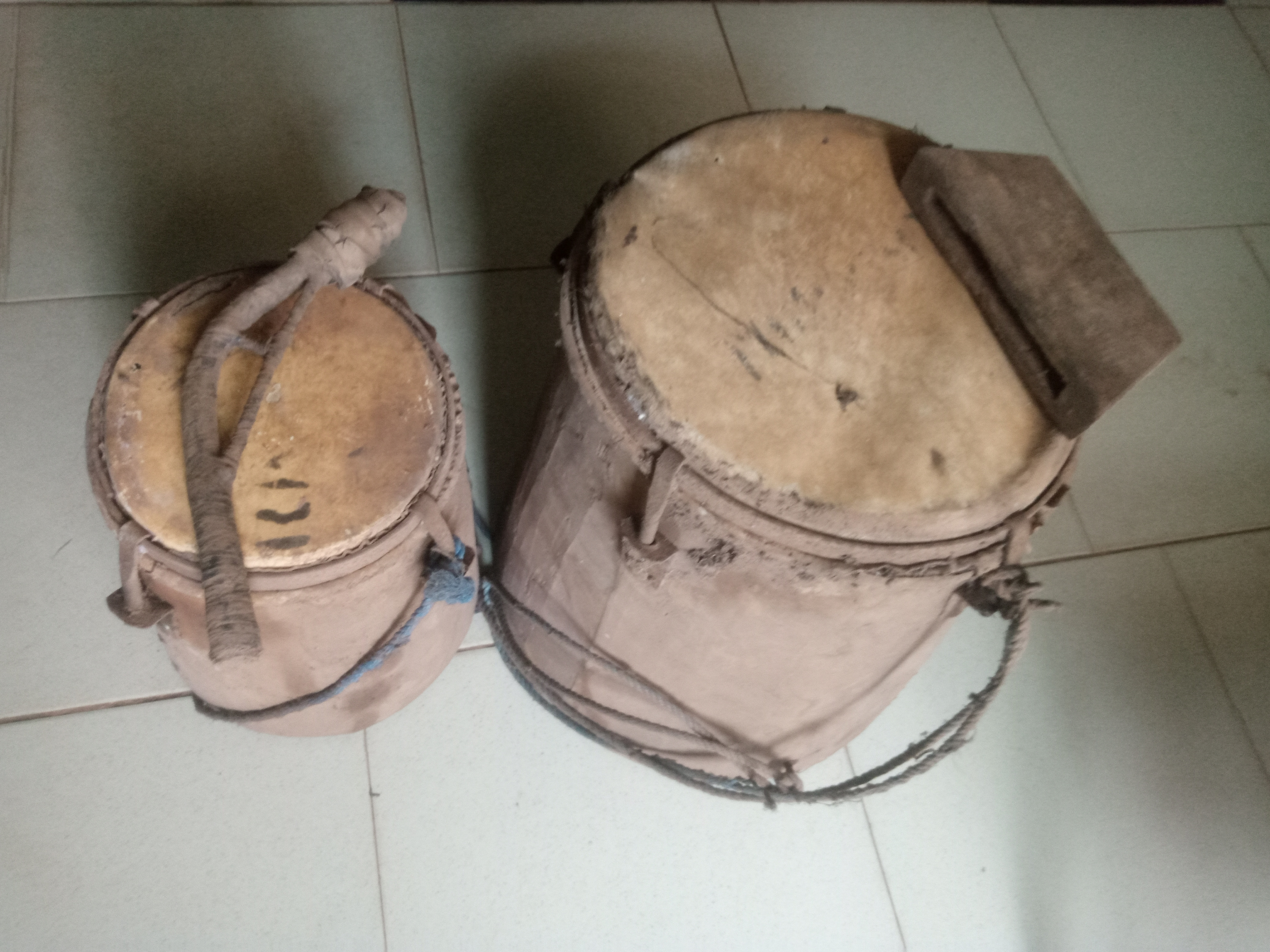
- Local drums made of wood
  Wood for Musical Instruments - A wide array of musical instruments, encompassing flutes, drums, gongs, bongo drums, okbokolo, ichaka, and others, are crafted from various wood types within the Anaocha, Anambra, Nigeria. These materials range from hardwoods like Iroko to softer varieties such as Akpu (Ceiba pentandra), spanning both historical and contemporary contexts.
- Wood for Carving Religious Figurines - Softwood types such as Akanta (Rauvolfia vomitoria), Ngwu (Alba feminea), Akpu (C. pentandra), and Ube (Dacryodes edulis) are used by most wood carvers in Anaocha for carving figurines and other sacred objects such as Ikenga, Agwu, masquerade masks, and royal stools/drums. This aspect of wood usage in the area is very important because it affirms the people's support for African cosmology and preference in carved objects made with good wood.
- Wood as a Source of Energy Supply - Fuelwood constitutes the main source of fuel for cooking, as more than 76% of Nigerians use fuelwood, leaving only 26% for cooking gas, kerosene, coal, and electricity. Sources of fuelwood include deadwoods, dry branches, twigs, wet/life woods, sawdust from wood, and charcoal extracted from wood. Users of fuelwood in the study area include smiths, palm oil millers, cassava (garri) producers, and bakery industries, among others.
- Wood for Household Furniture - Furniture produced from wood sources in the study area included upholstery, cane chairs, basket, broom, mat, and mortar/pestle. All these constitute household materials used for subsistence living in the study area. Oga tree provides major raw material for cane weaving, and cane crafts are produced in various sizes and shapes to serve different purposes. Its products include cane cupboard, cane bed, cane chair, cane basket, and cane mirror. Baskets, on the contrary, are produced in large quantities, ranging from large to medium and small to extra small sizes serving different purposes.
- Wood for Casket Production - Across various Igbo-speaking communities and broader regions, wooden materials including bamboo stems and banana leaves were historically employed for interring individuals from varied social strata. In contemporary contexts, wood is meticulously fashioned into a distinct form known as a casket, exclusively designated for the burial of deceased individuals.
- Wood for Fortification - During antiquity, wooden resources such as Ogilisi (Newbouldia laevis) and palm fronds (Elaeis guineensis) served as primary materials for constructing fences and gates surrounding numerous compounds within Igbo communities. This practice persists within the Anaocha Local Government Area, in Nigeria where palm fronds, Ogilisi, and lumber sourced from palm trees continue to be utilized for reinforcing family compounds among those without access to cement blocks. Wood also finds application in delineating boundaries for compounds, agricultural lands, villages, and towns.

== See also ==
- Fuel wood utilization in Nigeria
- Deforestation in Nigeria
