= Climate Summit =

Climate Summit may refer to:

- The 2014 UN Climate Summit held in New York on 23 September 2014
- The 2019 UN Climate Action Summit held in New York on 23 September 2019
