= Firewood in Nigeria =

Deforestation and use of fuel wood in Nigeria

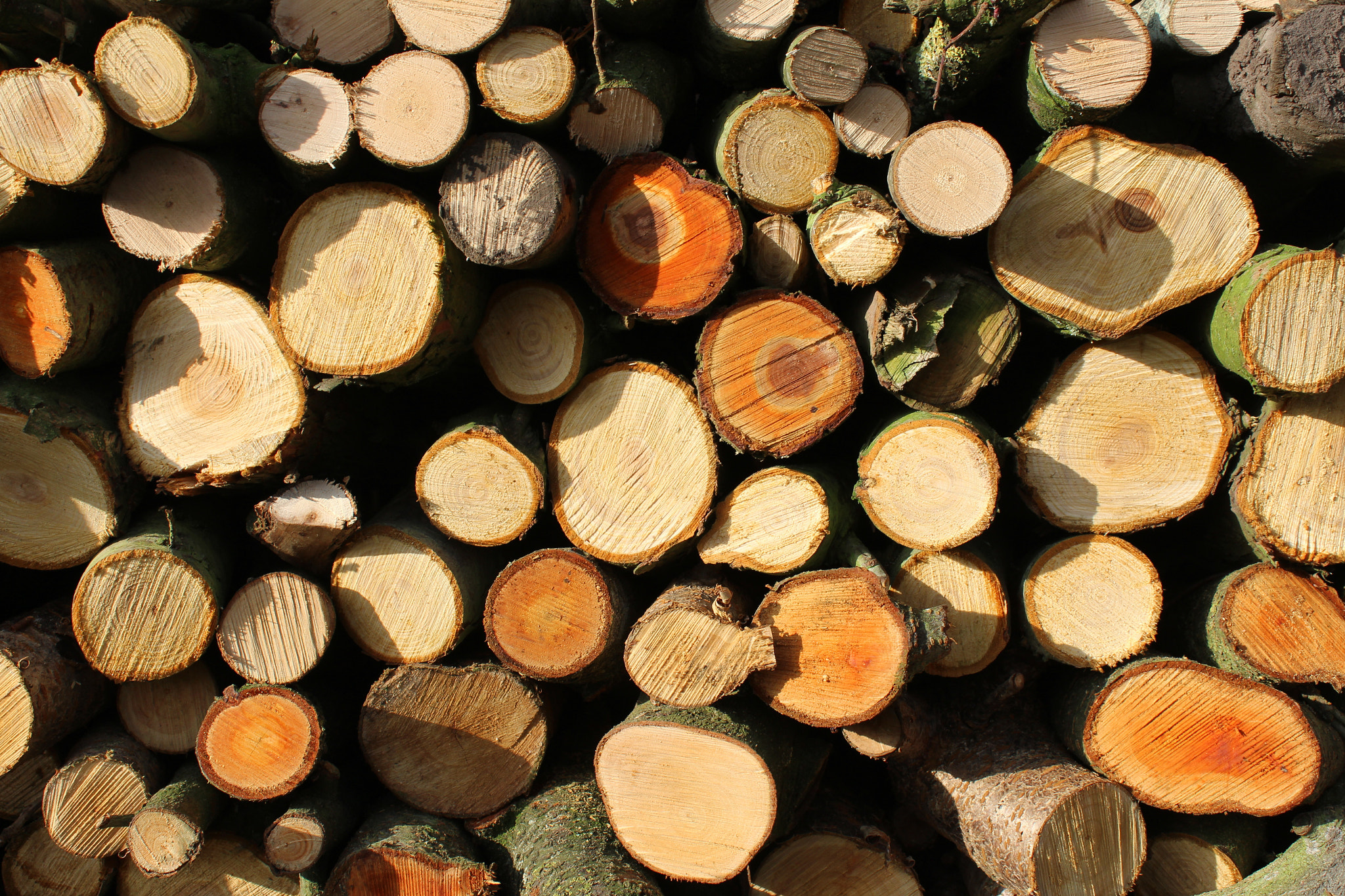
Firewood/fuelwood

In Nigeria, firewood is a traditional source of energy for domestic and commercial use. Firewood is derived from cutting and burning wood materials such as logs and twigs. It has long been prevalent among rural and sometimes urban dwellers.

Also in Nigeria, as in numerous other developing nations, a significant portion of the population lacks access to modern energy alternatives. Consequently, they heavily depend on traditional biomass fuels such as crop waste and wood to fulfill their basic energy requirements, particularly for home and commercial cooking purposes.

This reliance on firewood has implications for deforestation, as the unsustainable harvesting of wood for fuel contributes to the degradation of forests and the loss of biodiversity. The excessive demand for firewood places immense pressure on forest resources, leading to the depletion of woodlands and the disruption of delicate ecosystems. Furthermore, deforestation exacerbates climate change by releasing carbon dioxide, a greenhouse gas, into the atmosphere. This approach would not only aid in biodiversity conservation but also contribute to the expansion of national vegetation cover.

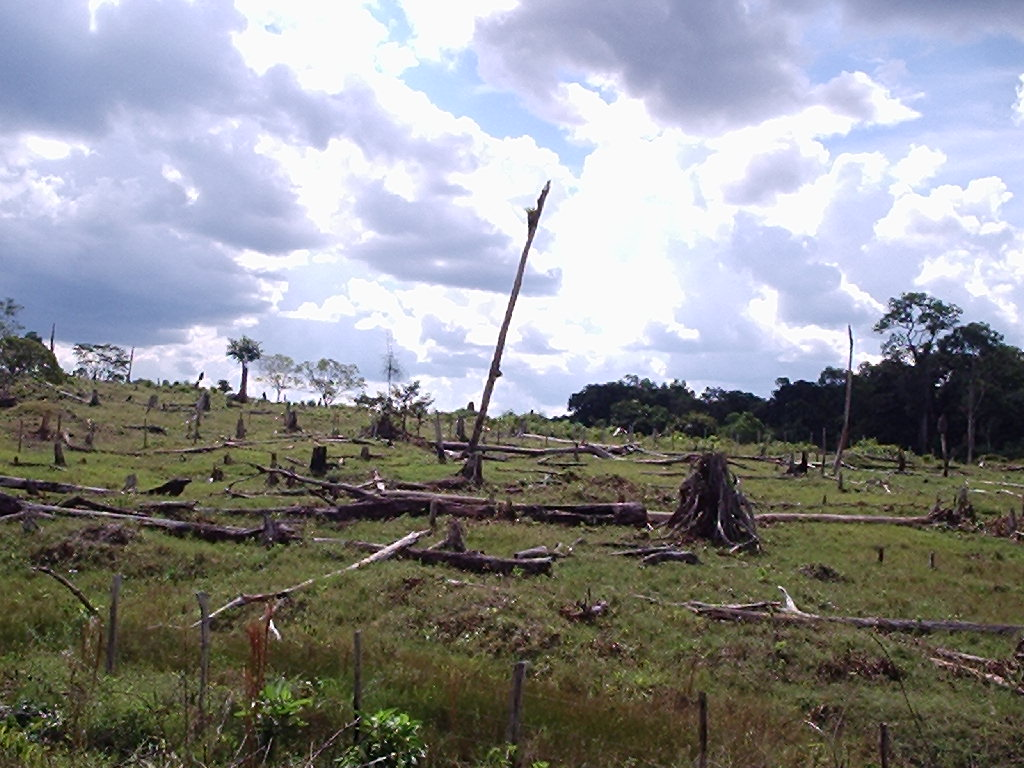
Deforestation of rainforest

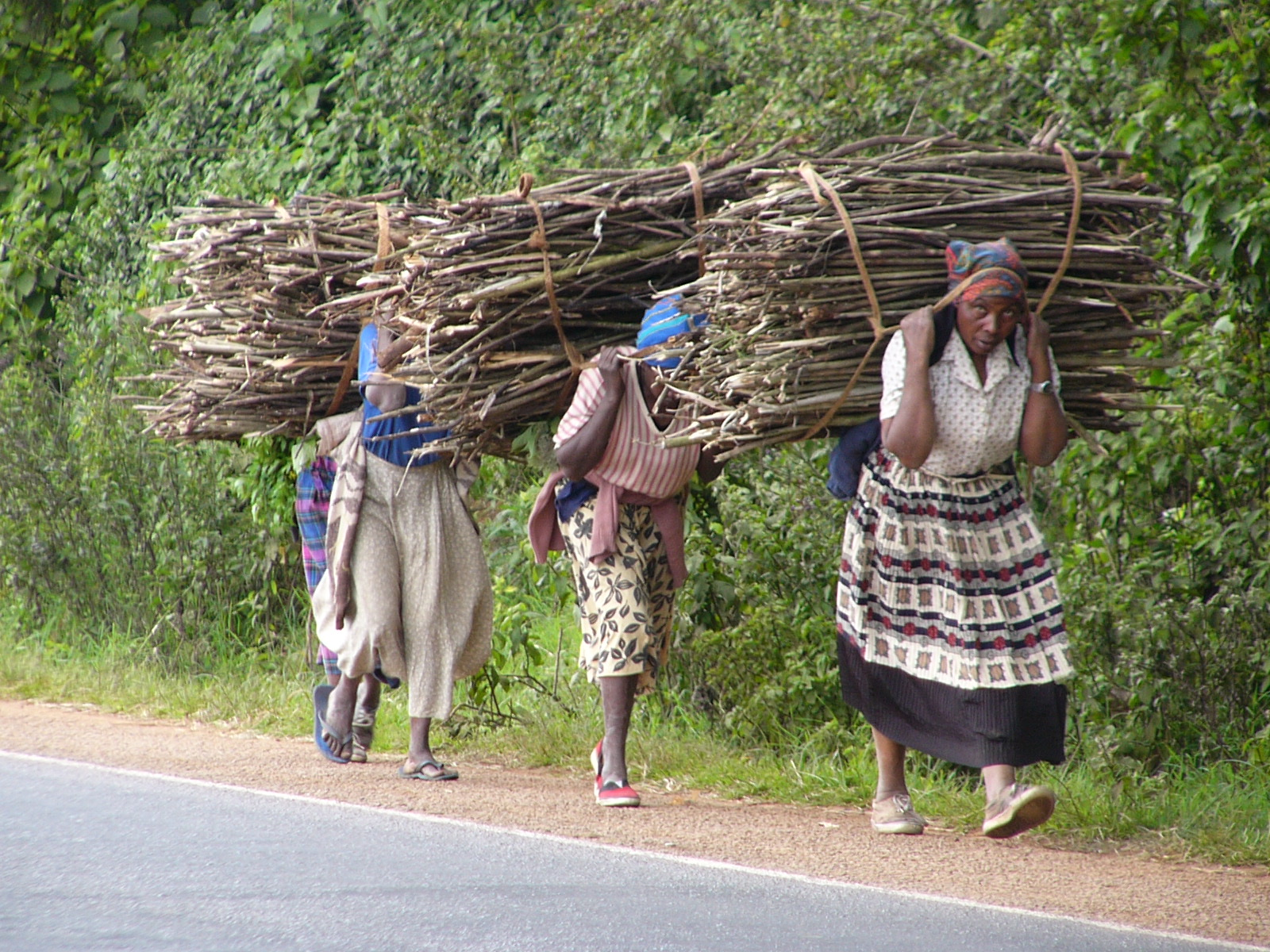
African women carrying firewood

== Government policies and initiatives ==
The Nigerian government has implemented various policies and initiatives to reduce firewood use, addressing the environmental and social challenges associated with its utilization. These efforts aim to conserve forests, improve energy efficiency, and transition to alternative energy sources.

To address deforestation and the loss of forest ecosystems caused by firewood utilization, the Nigerian government has implemented forest conservation and management strategies, such as the National Forest Policy. The National Forest Policy for the sustainable utilization of Nigeria's forest resources was introduced during the commemoration of the International Day of Forests in 2022. The policy was launched in Abuja, the capital of Nigeria. Other strategies include the establishment of protected areas, national parks, and forest reserves to safeguard valuable forest resources. The government collaborates with local communities, Non-Governmental Organizations (NGOs), and other stakeholders to develop sustainable forest management plans, promoting responsible harvesting practices and reforestation initiatives. By enforcing regulations and raising awareness about the importance of forest conservation, the government strives to preserve the ecological integrity and biodiversity of Nigerian forests.

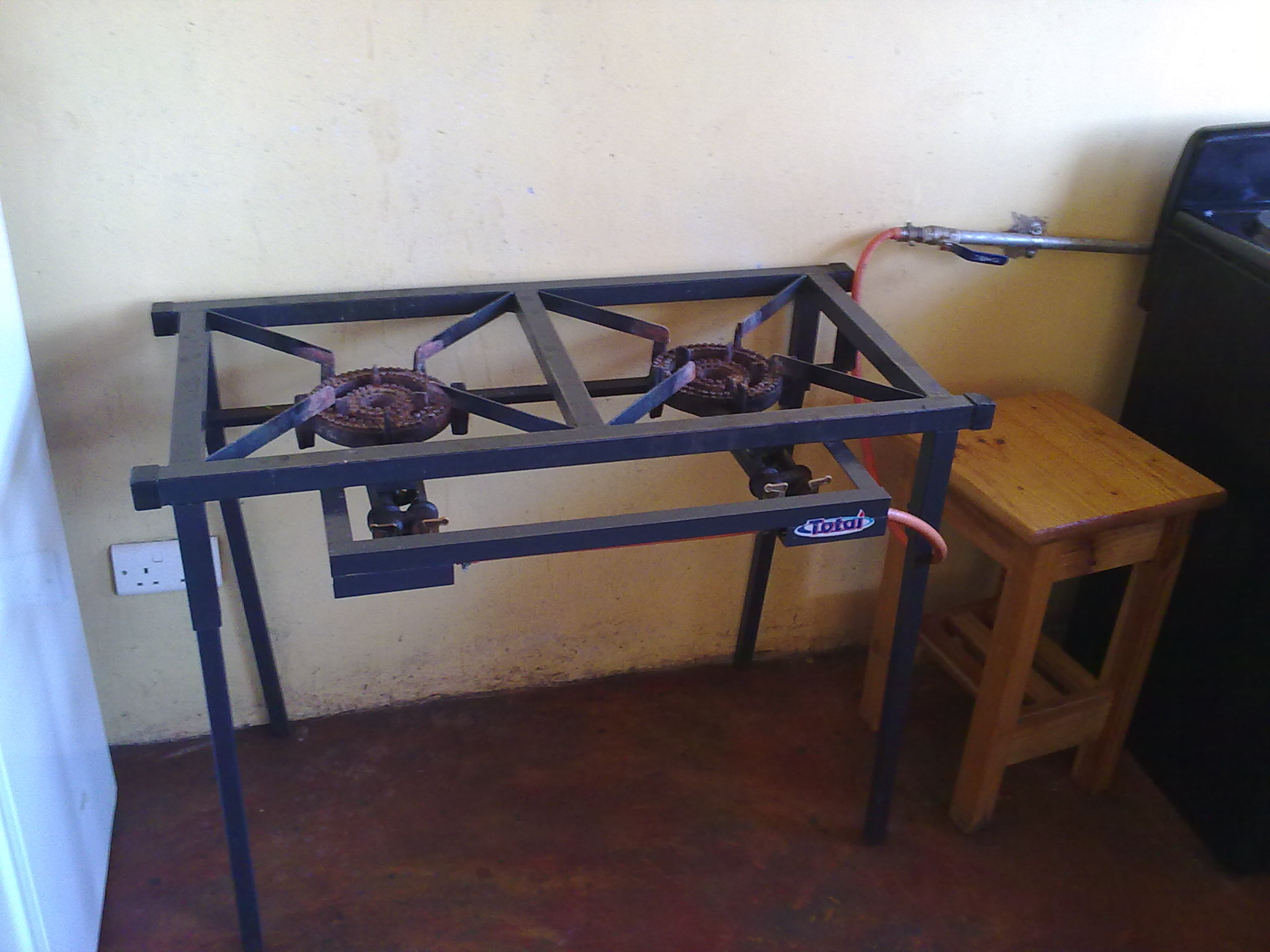
Clean and sustainable cooking using biogas stove

The promotion of efficient cooking technologies is a key aspect of the government's efforts to address the environmental and health concerns associated with fuel wood utilization. Traditional cooking methods, such as open fires and rudimentary stoves, are highly inefficient and contribute to high levels of smoke and indoor air pollution. The government promotes the adoption and distribution of these efficient cooking technologies through awareness campaigns, subsidies, and partnerships with NGOs and private sector entities. On October 5, 2021, the Federal Government of Nigeria joined forces with key stakeholders to ensure the successful implementation of Nationally Determined Contributions (NDCs) aimed at promoting the adoption of clean and efficient cooking technologies throughout the country.

Recognizing the need to transition away from firewood as a primary source of energy, the Nigerian government is actively promoting the use of alternative energy sources. This includes promoting the adoption of clean and renewable energy technologies such as solar power, wind energy, and biogas. In August 2022, Nigeria introduced its Energy Transition Plan. The plan encompasses key sectors such as power, cooking, oil and gas, transport, and industry. Vice President Yemi Osinbajo, along with other stakeholders in the energy sector, unveiled the plan, which outlines Nigeria's roadmap towards achieving net-zero emissions by 2060. By diversifying the energy mix and reducing reliance on fuel wood, the government aims to mitigate deforestation, improve air quality, and contribute to climate change mitigation efforts.

== Sustainable energy practices in Nigeria ==
The future outlook for energy practices in Nigeria is gradually shifting towards more sustainable alternatives, aiming to address the environmental, social, and economic challenges associated with firewood utilization. Efforts are being made to promote cleaner energy sources, improve energy efficiency, and foster sustainable practices in the country.

To ensure a sustainable future, there is also a need to prioritize sustainable forest management and conservation efforts. This involves implementing robust policies and regulations to prevent illegal logging, deforestation, and degradation of forest ecosystems. By promoting responsible and sustainable forest practices, which includes but not limited to, responsible harvesting practices, reforestation initiatives, Nigeria can protect its valuable forest resources, preserve biodiversity, and mitigate the adverse impacts of fuel wood utilization.

Community engagement, education, and awareness programs are crucial for fostering a culture of forest conservation and sustainable resource use. The Green Vision for Community Development Initiative (GVCDI), a Non-Governmental Organization (NGO), provided training to community members in Cross Rivers State on forest protection techniques to combat deforestation. In 1981, the Ekuri community in Nigeria, independently conceptualized a formal community forest management initiative. Their aim was to ensure the preservation of their heritage, sustain livelihoods, foster community development, reduce poverty, and prevent the negative consequences experienced by other communities that had lost their forests. This initiative was born out of the community's internal motivation and foresight, without any external influence.

One of the key focus areas for a sustainable energy transition in Nigeria is the promotion of renewable energy sources. The government, in collaboration with private sector entities and international partners, is investing in renewable energy infrastructure. These sources offer significant potential to diversify the energy mix, reduce greenhouse gas emissions, and provide access to clean and affordable energy, particularly in rural areas.

In parallel with the transition to renewable energy, enhancing energy efficiency is another crucial aspect of sustainable energy practices. Improving energy efficiency in sectors such as residential, commercial, agricultural, and industrial areas can contribute to reducing energy demand and optimizing resource utilization. This includes the promotion of energy-efficient appliances, building design and insulation standards, and the implementation of energy management systems. By adopting energy-efficient technologies and practices, Nigeria can reduce energy waste, lower energy costs, and lessen the environmental impact associated with energy consumption.

== See also ==
- Deforestation in Nigeria
- Firewood
- Wood industry in Nigeria
