= Bush burning in Nigeria =

Environmental hazard in Nigeria

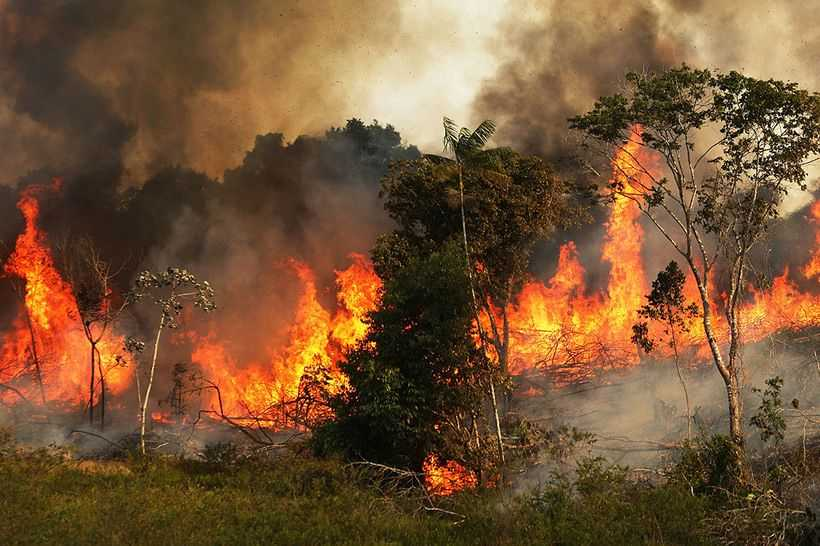
- A bush fire in Nigeria
- Date: Ongoing
- Location: Nigeria
- Type: Environmental hazard
- Cause: Agricultural practices, hunting, pest control, accidental ignition
- Outcome: Air pollution, soil degradation, loss of biodiversity, greenhouse gas emissions, damage to infrastructure and livelihoods
- Deaths: Unknown
- Injuries: Unknown
- Displaced: Unknown

Bush burning is the practice of setting fire to vegetation, either intentionally or accidentally, in Nigeria. It is a common occurrence during the dry season when the grasses and weeds are dry and flammable. Bush burning is mainly done for agricultural purposes, such as clearing land for cultivation, controlling pests, and enhancing soil fertility. It is also done for hunting, as some hunters use fire to drive out animals from their hiding places. However, bush burning has many negative effects on the environment, health, and economy. It causes air pollution, soil degradation, loss of biodiversity, greenhouse gas emissions, damage to infrastructure and livelihoods, and increased vulnerability to climate change.

== Causes ==
Bush burning in Nigeria is caused by various factors, including:

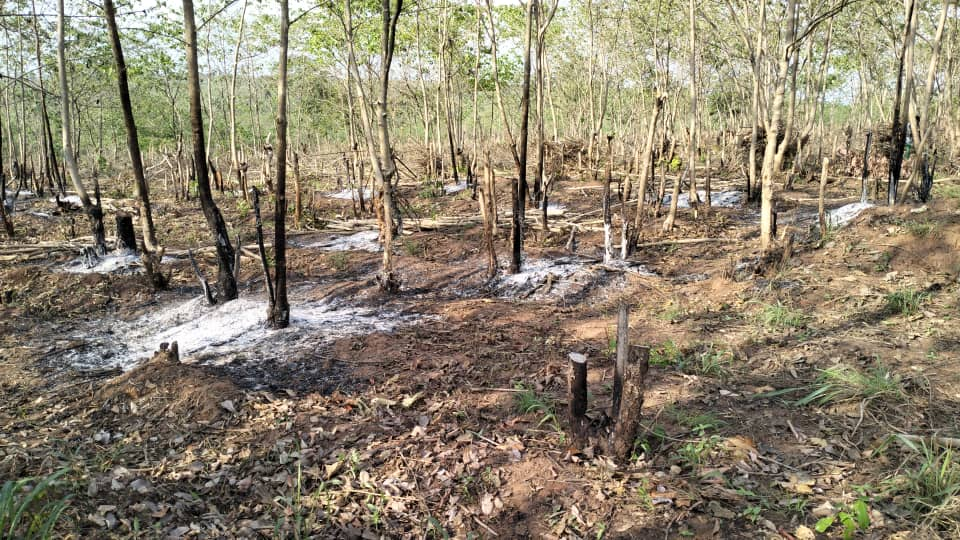
Bush burning at Ugwuoba getting set for farming in Enugu State

- Agricultural practices: Some farmers use fire to clear land for cultivation, especially in the savanna and forest zones. They believe that burning the vegetation will make the land easier to till, kill weeds and pests, and add nutrients to the soil. However, this practice is often done without proper planning, control, or monitoring, and can result in uncontrolled fires that spread to other areas.
- Hunting: Some hunters use fire to flush out animals from their hiding places, such as rodents, reptiles, and birds. They also use fire to create paths and access points in the bush. However, this practice can also result in uncontrolled fires that destroy the habitat and food sources of the wildlife.
- Pest control: Some livestock owners use fire to control pests that affect their animals, such as ticks, fleas, and tsetse flies. They also use fire to stimulate the growth of fresh grass for grazing. However, this practice can also result in uncontrolled fires that damage the vegetation and soil.
- Accidental ignition: Some fires are caused by accidental ignition from various sources, such as lightning, sparks from vehicles or machines, discarded cigarettes, fireworks, or cooking stoves. These fires can also spread rapidly and cause extensive damage.

== Effects ==
Bush burning in Nigeria has many negative effects on the environment, health, and economy, such as:

- Air pollution: Bush burning produces large amounts of smoke, ash, and particulate matter that pollute the air and reduce visibility. The smoke can also contain harmful substances, such as carbon monoxide, nitrogen oxides, sulfur dioxide, and volatile organic compounds, that can affect human and animal health. The smoke can also contribute to the formation of ozone and smog, which can aggravate respiratory and cardiovascular diseases.
- Soil degradation: Bush burning destroys the organic matter and nutrients in the soil, making it less fertile and productive. It also reduces the soil moisture and increases the soil temperature, making it more susceptible to erosion and compaction. It also alters the soil pH and microbial activity, affecting the soil quality and health.
- Loss of biodiversity: Bush burning destroys the habitat and food sources of many plants and animals, reducing their diversity and abundance. It also kills or displaces many species, especially those that are rare, endangered, or endemic. It also affects the genetic diversity and evolutionary processes of the surviving species.
- Greenhouse gas emissions: Bush burning releases large amounts of greenhouse gases, such as carbon dioxide, methane, and nitrous oxide, that contribute to global warming and climate change. These gases can also affect the regional and global climate patterns, such as rainfall, temperature, and wind.
- Damage to infrastructure and livelihoods: Bush burning can damage or destroy infrastructure, such as roads, bridges, buildings, power lines, and communication networks, affecting the transportation, communication, and service delivery. It can also damage or destroy livelihood assets, such as crops, livestock, food stocks, and equipment, affecting the food security, income, and well-being of the people.
- Increased vulnerability to climate change: Bush burning reduces the resilience and adaptive capacity of the ecosystems and communities to cope with the impacts of climate change, such as drought, flood, heat wave, and disease outbreak. It also reduces the potential of the ecosystems and communities to mitigate climate change, such as by sequestering carbon, regulating water, and providing ecosystem services.

== Regulations and alternatives ==
Bush burning in Nigeria is regulated by various laws and policies, such as the National Environmental Standards and Regulations Enforcement Agency (NESREA) Act, the National Policy on Environment, the National Forest Policy, and the National Climate Change Policy. These laws and policies aim to prevent, control, and manage bush burning and its effects, as well as to promote sustainable land management and environmental protection.

However, the enforcement and implementation of these laws and policies are often weak and ineffective, due to various challenges, such as lack of awareness, resources, coordination, and political will. Moreover, some of these laws and policies are outdated and do not reflect the current realities and challenges of bush burning and climate change.

Therefore, there is a need for more effective and efficient regulations and alternatives for bush burning in Nigeria, such as:

- Awareness and education: There is a need to raise awareness and educate the public, especially the farmers and hunters, about the causes and effects of bush burning, as well as the benefits and methods of alternative practices. This can be done through various channels, such as media, campaigns, workshops, and extension services.
- Alternative practices: There is a need to promote and adopt alternative practices that can achieve the same or better results as bush burning, without causing harm to the environment and health. Some of these practices include: mechanical clearing, mulching, composting, crop rotation, intercropping, agroforestry, integrated pest management, controlled burning, and firebreaks.
- Incentives and sanctions: There is a need to provide incentives and sanctions to encourage and discourage certain behaviors and actions related to bush burning. Some of these incentives and sanctions include: subsidies, loans, grants, awards, recognition, penalties, fines, prosecution, and confiscation.
- Monitoring and evaluation: There is a need to monitor and evaluate the implementation and impact of the laws, policies, and practices related to bush burning. This can be done through various methods, such as remote sensing, field surveys, interviews, and feedback. This can also help to identify and address the gaps, challenges, and opportunities for improvement.

== See also ==
- Deforestation in Nigeria
- Environmental issues in Nigeria
- Wildfire
