= Climate of Nigeria =

Climate zones in Nigeria

Nigeria map of Köppen climate classification

The climate of Nigeria is mostly tropical. Nigeria has three distinct climatic zones, two seasons, and an average temperature ranging between 21 °C and 35 °C. Two major elements determine the temperature in Nigeria: the climatic change towards the sun and the atmosphere's transparency (as determined by the dual interplay of rainfall and humidity). Its rainfall is mediated by three distinct conditions including convectional, frontal, and orographical determinants. Statistics from the World Bank Group showed Nigeria's annual temperature and rainfall variations, the nation's highest average annual mean temperature was 28.1 °C in 1938, while its wettest year was 1957 with an annual mean rainfall of 1,441.45 mm (56.750 in).

The climate has a significant impact on the country's agriculture, economy, and society. The rainy season is the most important time for agriculture, as it is the time when most crops are planted and harvested. The dry season is a time of drought, which can lead to water shortages and crop failures. The high temperatures and humidity can also be uncomfortable and can lead to health problems. Nigeria's climate is influenced by its geographical location, topography, and the interactions of various air masses. Nigeria is situated in West Africa, between latitudes 4°N and 14°N, and longitudes 2°E and 14°E. It experiences a tropical climate characterized by distinct wet and dry seasons.

== Climate of the country ==
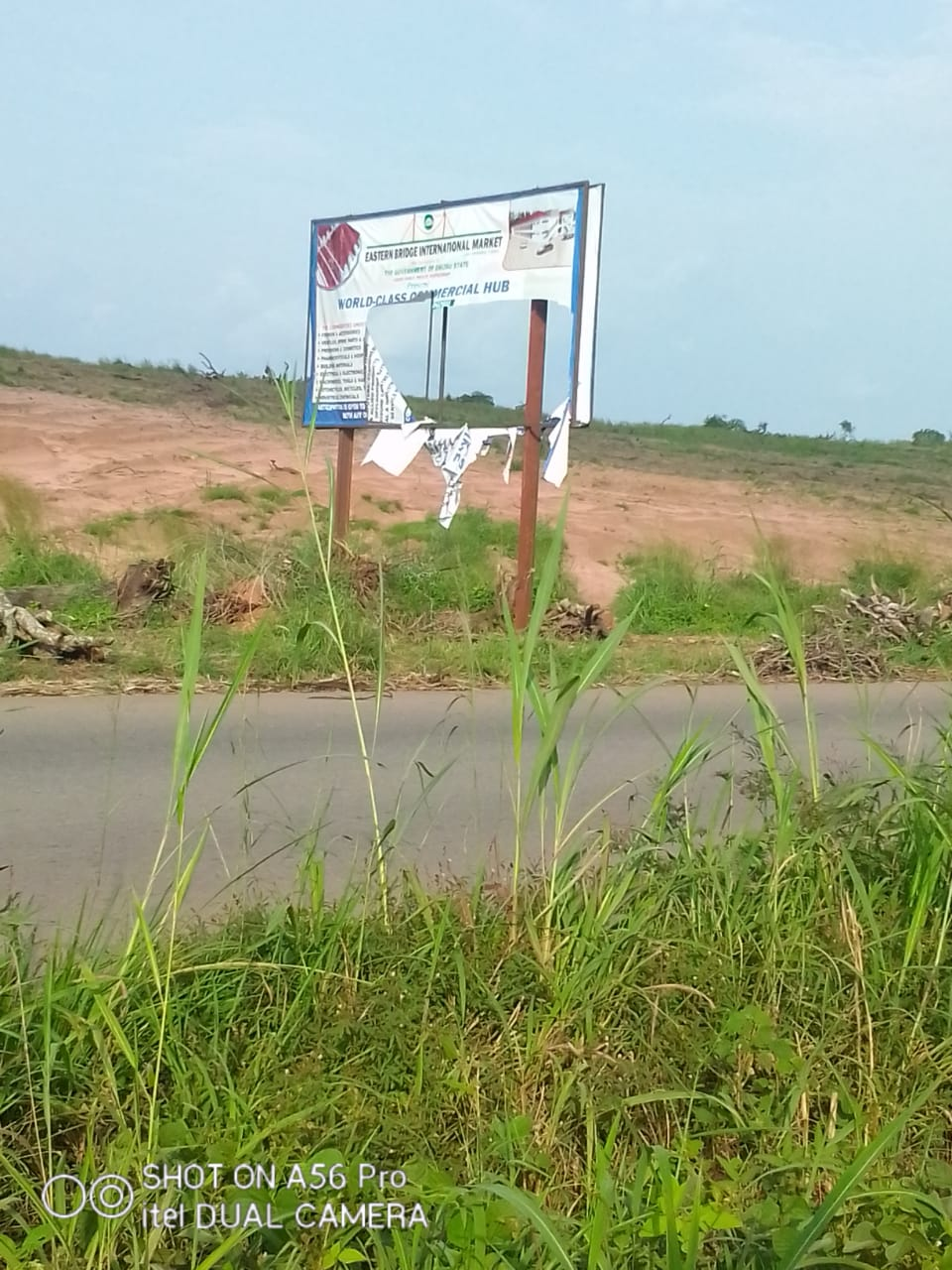
Opi Environment

Nigeria has three distinct climatic zones. According to the Nigerian Meteorological Agency, it is mainly tropical. It can be categorized into three including the tropical monsoon climate in the southern part, the tropical savannah climate, and Sahelian hot and semi-arid climate in the northern parts of the country. While temperature and rainfall plays key roles in the determination of the country's climate, rainfall has been opined to be the key element based on its relevance and implications for agriculture.

=== Tropical monsoon climate (Am) ===
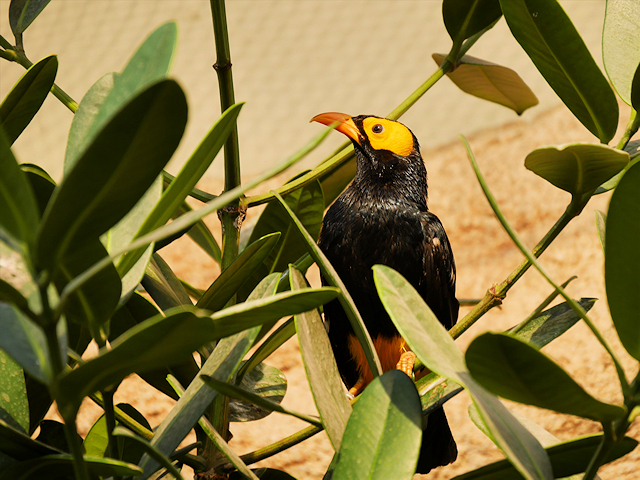
tropical monsoon

Tropical monsoon climate can be found in south southern part of the nation. This climate generally has an estimated average annual rainfall of 2,000 mm (6.6 ft) which varies for both the coastal areas and the inland regions. During the dry season, regions with this climate have a monthly mean temperature ranging from 23 °C (73 °F) during nighttime to 31 °C (88 °F) at daytime. Port Harcourt, Delta and Bayelsa are examples of regions experiencing Tropical monsoon. The Am climate is found in the northern regions of Nigeria. It is characterized by a shorter wet season and a longer dry season compared to the Aw climate. The average annual rainfall ranges from 600 to 1,200 mm. The wet season usually lasts from May to September, while the dry season extends from October to April.

=== Tropical savannah climate (Aw) ===
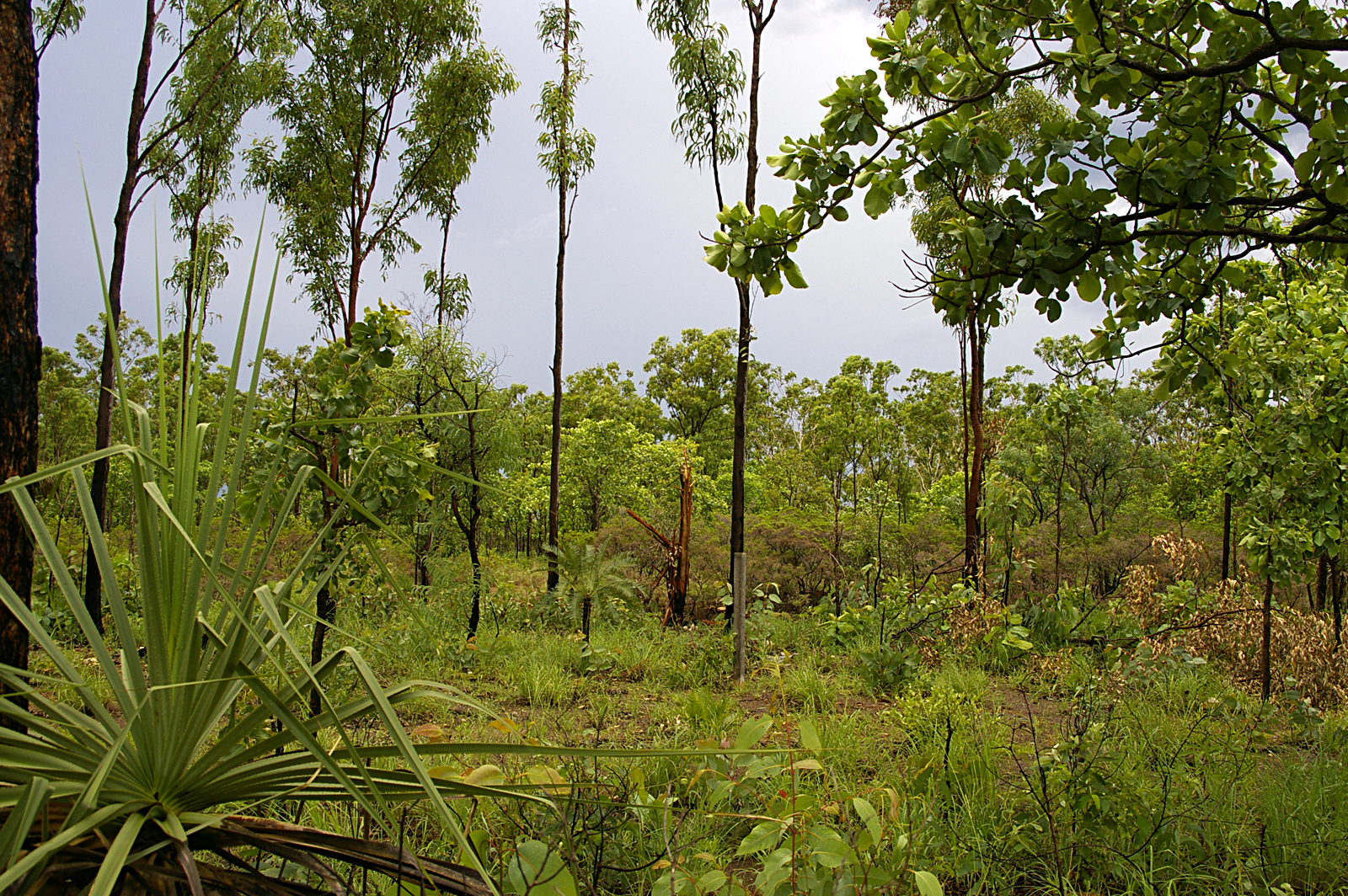
Tropical savanna

The tropical savannah climate is also called tropical wet and dry climate, as they tend to have both wet and dry seasons. It could be either a lengthy dry season and a relatively short wet season; or a lengthy wet season and a relatively short dry season. The tropical savannah climate has a mean annual rainfall of about 1,200 mm (3.9 ft) or below, while the monthly mean temperature ranges from 22 °C (72 °F) during nighttime to 33 °C (91 °F) at daytime. Lagos State is an example of a state with this type of climate. However, most central and southern parts of the nation also have this climate.

=== Sahelian hot (BWh) and semiarid climates (BSh) ===
The Sahelian hot and semiarid climates have average daytime temperatures of 35 °C (95 °F) and 21 °C (70 °F) at nighttime. Regions experiencing this climate are majorly part of the Northern part of Nigeria and they experience very low annual mean rainfall below 700 mm (2.3 ft). Northern states like Kaduna, Jigawa and Sokoto are examples.

== Climatic Zones of the Country ==
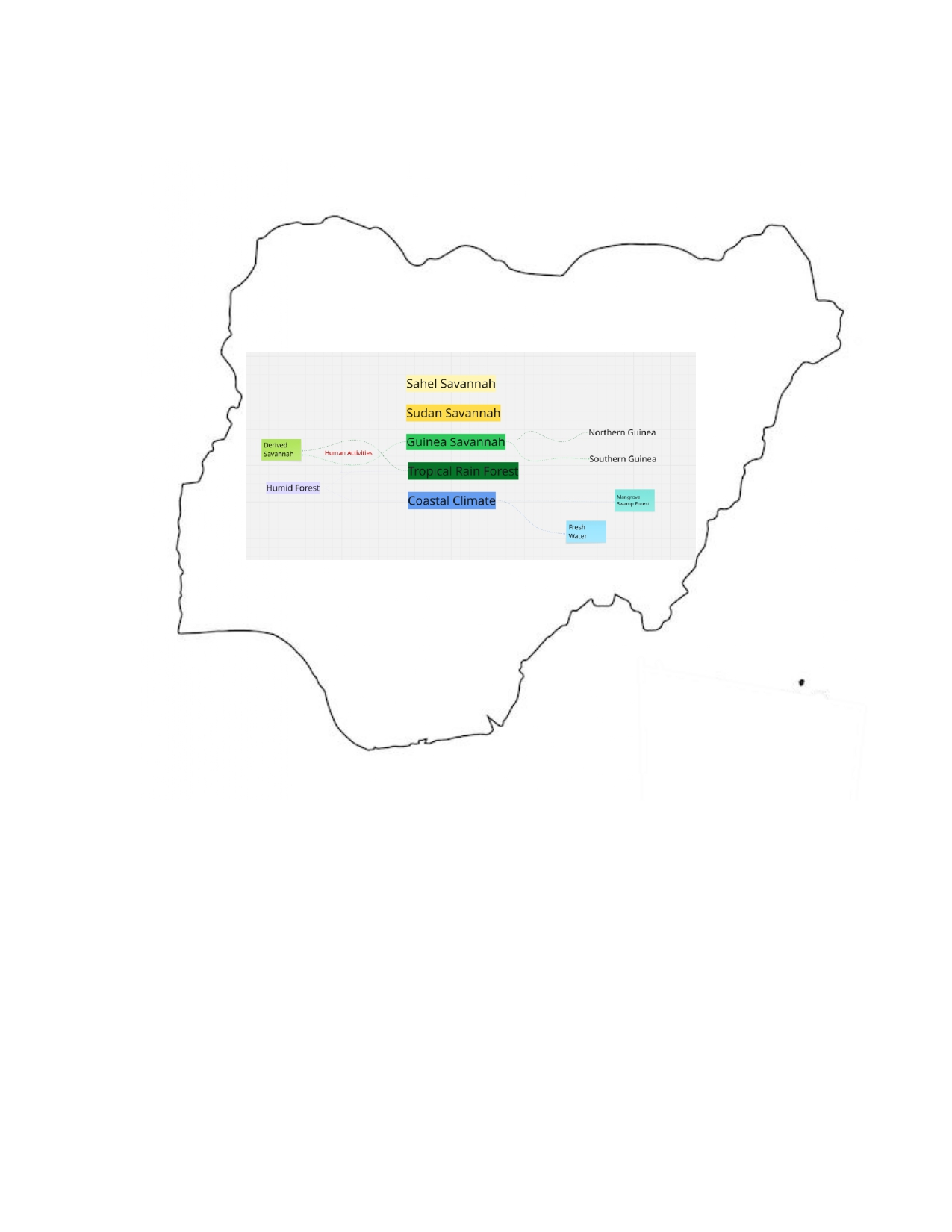
A flowchart showing the different climatic zones in Nigeria

- Sahel Savannah
- Sudan Savannah
- Guinea Savannah
- Tropical Rain Forest
- Coastal Climate

== Seasons ==
Nigeria has two seasons in a year: dry and wet.

=== Dry season ===
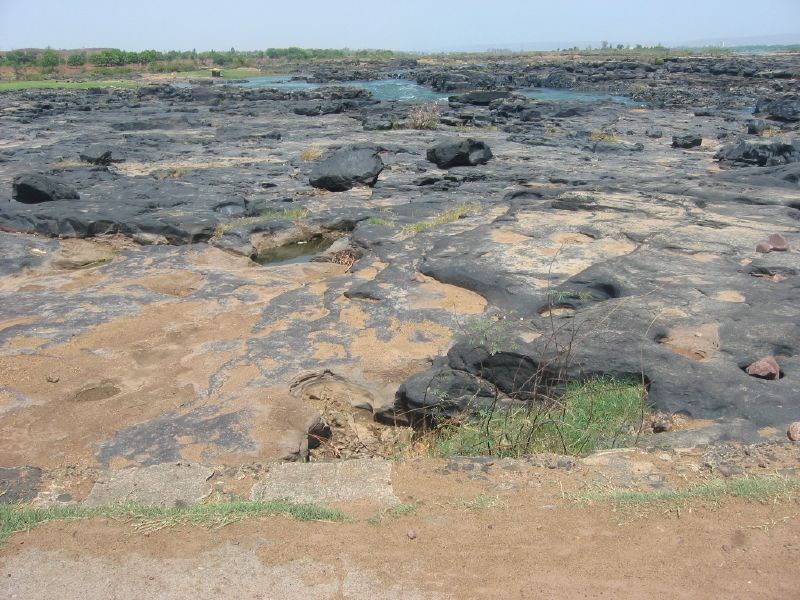
Niger river bed in dry season

The dry season is accompanied by the dusty northeast winds where midday temperatures that can sometimes reach 100 °F (38 °C). During the dry season, there are lesser rainfalls, more sun and lower humidity. This period falls between October and April every year. It is normal to experience harmattan and dry spells during this period. The harmattan usually appears from December to January. 1983 holds the record as the driest year Nigeria has ever seen since 1981.

=== Wet season ===
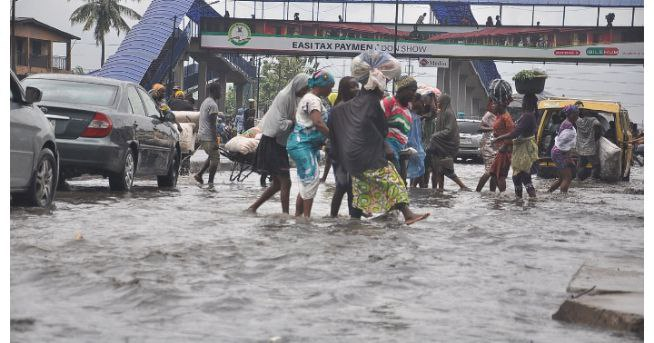
flood caused by heavy rain in Lagos Express way.

The wet season is also referred to as rainy season. It falls between April and September every year. The wet season is particularly noticeable on the southeastern coast, where annual rainfall reaches about 130 inches (330 cm), where temperatures rarely exceed 90 °F (32 °C). 2019 holds the record as the wettest year Nigeria has ever seen since 1981.

== Temperature ==
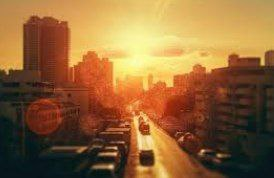
Temperature rise as sun radiates on a city

Nigeria experiences high temperatures throughout the year, influenced by its location near the equator. The average annual temperature ranges from 25 °C to 32 °C, with regional variations based on factors such as elevation and proximity to water bodies.

The average monthly temperature in Nigeria is between 24 °C and 30 °C.

The highest temperatures are usually seen between February and April during the dry season and are called the hot season. It falls between February and March ranging from 39.5 to 39.9 °C (103.1 to 103.8 °F) in the south, and March to May ranging from 42.9 °C to 44.5 °C in the north. In 2021, this period lasted until May.

In 2020, Nigeria saw a slight increase with southern states recording a mean average temperature of 30 °C - 32 °C while northern states had a record of 34 °C to 37 °C. Nigeria recorded 2021 as the year with the highest temperature in 40 years.

== Examples ==
Climate data for Vandeikya (1980–2024)
Month	Jan	Feb	Mar	Apr	May	Jun	Jul	Aug	Sep	Oct	Nov	Dec	Year
Mean daily maximum °C (°F)	30.0 (86.0)	31.7 (89.1)	31.7 (89.1)	30.6 (87.1)	29.4 (84.9)	28.3 (82.9)	27.8 (82.0)	27.2 (81.0)	27.8 (82.0)	28.3 (82.9)	29.4 (84.9)	29.4 (84.9)	31.7 (89.1)
Daily mean °C (°F)	23.9 (75.0)	25.6 (78.1)	26.7 (80.1)	26.7 (80.1)	26.1 (79.0)	25.0 (77.0)	24.4 (75.9)	24.4 (75.9)	24.4 (75.9)	25.0 (77.0)	25.0 (77.0)	23.9 (75.0)	25.1 (77.2)
Mean daily minimum °C (°F)	18.9 (66.0)	20.6 (69.1)	22.8 (73.0)	23.3 (73.9)	23.3 (73.9)	22.8 (73.0)	22.2 (72.0)	21.7 (71.1)	22.2 (72.0)	22.2 (72.0)	21.1 (70.0)	18.9 (66.0)	21.7 (71.1)
Average precipitation mm (inches)	2.54 (0.10)	12.70 (0.50)	55.88 (2.20)	119.38 (4.70)	175.26 (6.90)	208.28 (8.20)	215.90 (8.50)	228.60 (9.00)	254.00 (10.00)	210.82 (8.30)	48.26 (1.90)	2.54 (0.10)	1,534.16 (60.40)
Average precipitation days (≥ 1.0 mm)	0.6	2.5	10.9	18.2	22.7	22.9	23.0	24.2	25.4	23.2	7.0	0.6	181.0
Average relative humidity (%) (at 15:00 LST)	36.3	55.8	85.0	96.3	99.5	99.6	99.9	99.3	99.6	99.3	69.1	36.9	81.4
Source: Weather spark

Climate data for Okada Town, Nigeria
Month	Jan	Feb	Mar	Apr	May	Jun	Jul	Aug	Sep	Oct	Nov	Dec	Year
Mean daily maximum °C (°F)	34.3 (93.7)	34 (93)	32.8 (91.0)	31.2 (88.2)	30.1 (86.2)	28.7 (83.7)	28.1 (82.6)	28 (82)	28.5 (83.3)	29.5 (85.1)	30.8 (87.4)	33 (91)	30.7 (87.3)
Daily mean °C (°F)	27.5 (81.5)	27.8 (82.0)	27.4 (81.3)	26.6 (79.9)	25.9 (78.6)	24.9 (76.8)	24.3 (75.7)	24.3 (75.7)	24.5 (76.1)	25.1 (77.2)	26 (79)	26.9 (80.4)	25.9 (78.7)
Mean daily minimum °C (°F)	22.6 (72.7)	24 (75)	24.6 (76.3)	24.2 (75.6)	23.6 (74.5)	22.9 (73.2)	22.4 (72.3)	22.2 (72.0)	22.4 (72.3)	22.7 (72.9)	23.2 (73.8)	22.7 (72.9)	23.1 (73.6)
Average precipitation mm (inches)	24 (0.9)	42 (1.7)	95 (3.7)	159 (6.3)	210 (8.3)	244 (9.6)	247 (9.7)	233 (9.2)	252 (9.9)	194 (7.6)	63 (2.5)	20 (0.8)	1,783 (70.2)
Average rainy days	5	8	16	18	20	20	21	20	20	19	11	5	183
Average relative humidity (%)	61	71	80	86	88	90	89	87	89	89	85	71	82
Mean monthly sunshine hours	7.8	7.0	6.2	5.7	5.3	4.5	4.2	3.9	4.3	4.8	5.4	7.4	66.5
Source: Climate-Data.org

Climate data for Ebenebe
Month	Jan	Feb	Mar	Apr	May	Jun	Jul	Aug	Sep	Oct	Nov	Dec	Year
Mean daily maximum °C (°F)	32.6 (90.7)	33.8 (92.8)	33.9 (93.0)	33.5 (92.3)	32 (90)	30.4 (86.7)	29 (84)	28.1 (82.6)	29.6 (85.3)	30.8 (87.4)	32.3 (90.1)	32.8 (91.0)	31.6 (88.8)
Mean daily minimum °C (°F)	27.4 (81.3)	28.4 (83.1)	29 (84)	28.7 (83.7)	27.6 (81.7)	26.3 (79.3)	25.6 (78.1)	25.2 (77.4)	25.8 (78.4)	26.5 (79.7)	27.5 (81.5)	27.3 (81.1)	27.1 (80.8)
Average precipitation mm (inches)	3 (0.1)	35 (1.4)	17 (0.7)	100 (3.9)	150 (5.9)	78 (3.1)	125 (4.9)	80 (3.1)	50 (2.0)	222 (8.7)	106 (4.2)	0 (0)	966 (38)
Average rainy days	2	2	4	5	5	5	10	7	5	12	6	0	63
Source: Climate-data.org

Climate data for Lagos (Murtala Muhammed International Airport) 1961–1990, extremes: 1886–present
Month	Jan	Feb	Mar	Apr	May	Jun	Jul	Aug	Sep	Oct	Nov	Dec	Year
Record high °C (°F)	40.0 (104.0)	37.1 (98.8)	37.0 (98.6)	39.6 (103.3)	37.0 (98.6)	37.6 (99.7)	33.2 (91.8)	33.0 (91.4)	33.2 (91.8)	33.7 (92.7)	39.9 (103.8)	36.4 (97.5)	40.0 (104.0)
Mean daily maximum °C (°F)	32.2 (90.0)	33.2 (91.8)	32.9 (91.2)	32.2 (90.0)	30.9 (87.6)	29.3 (84.7)	28.2 (82.8)	28.3 (82.9)	28.9 (84.0)	30.3 (86.5)	31.4 (88.5)	31.8 (89.2)	30.8 (87.4)
Daily mean °C (°F)	27.3 (81.1)	28.4 (83.1)	28.5 (83.3)	28.0 (82.4)	27.0 (80.6)	25.6 (78.1)	25.2 (77.4)	25.0 (77.0)	25.5 (77.9)	26.4 (79.5)	27.2 (81.0)	27.2 (81.0)	26.8 (80.2)
Mean daily minimum °C (°F)	22.4 (72.3)	23.7 (74.7)	24.1 (75.4)	23.7 (74.7)	23.2 (73.8)	21.9 (71.4)	22.3 (72.1)	21.8 (71.2)	22.1 (71.8)	22.4 (72.3)	23.0 (73.4)	22.5 (72.5)	22.8 (73.0)
Record low °C (°F)	12.6 (54.7)	16.1 (61.0)	14.0 (57.2)	14.9 (58.8)	20.0 (68.0)	21.2 (70.2)	15.0 (59.0)	19.0 (66.2)	13.0 (55.4)	17.9 (64.2)	11.1 (52.0)	11.6 (52.9)	11.1 (52.0)
Average precipitation mm (inches)	13.2 (0.52)	40.6 (1.60)	84.3 (3.32)	146.3 (5.76)	202.4 (7.97)	315.5 (12.42)	243.0 (9.57)	121.7 (4.79)	160.0 (6.30)	125.1 (4.93)	39.7 (1.56)	14.8 (0.58)	1,506.6 (59.31)
Average precipitation days (≥ 1.0 mm)	1.5	2.8	6.6	9.0	12.5	16.2	13.2	11.6	12.7	11.2	4.9	2.1	104.3
Average relative humidity (%)	81	79	76	82	84	87	87	85	86	87	84	82	83
Average dew point °C (°F)	21 (70)	24 (75)	25 (77)	25 (77)	24 (75)	24 (75)	23 (73)	23 (73)	24 (75)	24 (75)	24 (75)	23 (73)	24 (74)
Mean monthly sunshine hours	164.3	168.0	173.6	180.0	176.7	114.0	99.2	108.5	114.0	167.4	186.0	192.2	1,843.9
Mean daily sunshine hours	5.3	6.1	5.6	6.0	5.7	3.8	3.2	3.5	3.8	5.4	6.2	6.2	5.1
Source 1: Deutscher Wetterdienst (humidity, 1952–1967), NOAA (monthly sun hours)
Source 2: Meteo Climat (record highs and lows) Time and Date (dewpoints, 2005-2015) Weather Atlas (daily sun hours)

Climate data for Port Harcourt (1961-1990 normals)
Month	Jan	Feb	Mar	Apr	May	Jun	Jul	Aug	Sep	Oct	Nov	Dec	Year
Mean daily maximum °C (°F)	32.4 (90.3)	33.4 (92.1)	32.6 (90.7)	32.1 (89.8)	31.2 (88.2)	30.0 (86.0)	28.8 (83.8)	28.7 (83.7)	29.3 (84.7)	30.2 (86.4)	31.3 (88.3)	31.8 (89.2)	31.0 (87.8)
Mean daily minimum °C (°F)	21.2 (70.2)	22.5 (72.5)	23.3 (73.9)	23.2 (73.8)	23.2 (73.8)	22.7 (72.9)	22.4 (72.3)	22.4 (72.3)	22.4 (72.3)	22.4 (72.3)	22.4 (72.3)	21.4 (70.5)	22.5 (72.5)
Average rainfall mm (inches)	22.2 (0.87)	56.5 (2.22)	116.3 (4.58)	183.6 (7.23)	222.7 (8.77)	273.3 (10.76)	356.5 (14.04)	326.8 (12.87)	367.1 (14.45)	263.1 (10.36)	96.9 (3.81)	25.9 (1.02)	2,310.9 (90.98)
Average rainy days	2.2	4.6	8.6	11.6	14.2	16.5	19.7	19.8	20.1	14.4	5.9	2.1	139.7
Average relative humidity (%) (at 15:00 LST)	54.6	57.0	65.3	70.1	74.1	78.5	81.1	81.6	81.3	77.7	69.3	58.5	70.8
Mean monthly sunshine hours	142.6	123.2	114.7	132.0	139.5	102.0	77.5	74.4	78.0	102.3	132.0	148.8	1,367
Mean daily sunshine hours	4.6	4.4	3.7	4.4	4.5	3.4	2.5	2.4	2.6	3.3	4.4	4.8	3.7
Source 1: World Meteorological Organization
Source 2: NOAA (sun and relative humidity, 1961–1990)

Climate data for Abuja
Month	Jan	Feb	Mar	Apr	May	Jun	Jul	Aug	Sep	Oct	Nov	Dec	Year
Record high °C (°F)	36.0 (96.8)	38.4 (101.1)	39.7 (103.5)	39.0 (102.2)	39.3 (102.7)	34.0 (93.2)	32.0 (89.6)	31.2 (88.2)	31.0 (87.8)	35.0 (95.0)	37.9 (100.2)	37.6 (99.7)	39.7 (103.5)
Mean daily maximum °C (°F)	33.7 (92.7)	37.1 (98.8)	37.0 (98.6)	34.9 (94.8)	33.7 (92.7)	30.4 (86.7)	28.9 (84.0)	28.4 (83.1)	29.3 (84.7)	30.1 (86.2)	34.7 (94.5)	34.8 (94.6)	32.8 (91.0)
Daily mean °C (°F)	26.1 (79.0)	28.7 (83.7)	30.5 (86.9)	28.9 (84.0)	28.6 (83.5)	26.9 (80.4)	25.9 (78.6)	24.8 (76.6)	25.4 (77.7)	27.0 (80.6)	28.0 (82.4)	27.6 (81.7)	27.4 (81.3)
Mean daily minimum °C (°F)	19.2 (66.6)	22.2 (72.0)	25.4 (77.7)	24.5 (76.1)	24.4 (75.9)	23.4 (74.1)	23.1 (73.6)	22.4 (72.3)	22.7 (72.9)	23.6 (74.5)	21.1 (70.0)	20.8 (69.4)	22.7 (72.9)
Record low °C (°F)	15.0 (59.0)	18.6 (65.5)	20.0 (68.0)	21.7 (71.1)	21.6 (70.9)	20.8 (69.4)	20.3 (68.5)	20.0 (68.0)	20.0 (68.0)	21.6 (70.9)	17.0 (62.6)	17.0 (62.6)	15.0 (59.0)
Average rainfall mm (inches)	3 (0.1)	7 (0.3)	16 (0.6)	73 (2.9)	137 (5.4)	187 (7.4)	216 (8.5)	272 (10.7)	233 (9.2)	117 (4.6)	7 (0.3)	2 (0.1)	1,270 (50.1)
Average rainy days	0.1	0.2	1.3	3.2	9.4	10.3	13.0	17.2	15.9	8.0	0.3	0.1	79
Source: Deutscher Wetterdienst.

Climate data for Benin City
Month	Jan	Feb	Mar	Apr	May	Jun	Jul	Aug	Sep	Oct	Nov	Dec	Year
Record high °C (°F)	34.4 (93.9)	36.1 (97.0)	36.1 (97.0)	35.6 (96.1)	35.0 (95.0)	33.3 (91.9)	31.7 (89.1)	31.1 (88.0)	32.8 (91.0)	32.8 (91.0)	34.4 (93.9)	34.4 (93.9)	36.1 (97.0)
Mean daily maximum °C (°F)	31.9 (89.4)	33.3 (91.9)	33.0 (91.4)	32.4 (90.3)	31.6 (88.9)	29.9 (85.8)	27.9 (82.2)	27.9 (82.2)	28.8 (83.8)	30.3 (86.5)	31.8 (89.2)	32.0 (89.6)	30.9 (87.6)
Daily mean °C (°F)	25.8 (78.4)	26.7 (80.1)	26.7 (80.1)	26.4 (79.5)	25.9 (78.6)	24.9 (76.8)	23.8 (74.8)	23.7 (74.7)	24.3 (75.7)	25.0 (77.0)	25.9 (78.6)	25.7 (78.3)	25.4 (77.7)
Mean daily minimum °C (°F)	21.4 (70.5)	22.1 (71.8)	22.6 (72.7)	22.6 (72.7)	22.6 (72.7)	21.9 (71.4)	21.6 (70.9)	21.2 (70.2)	21.8 (71.2)	21.8 (71.2)	22.1 (71.8)	21.2 (70.2)	21.9 (71.4)
Record low °C (°F)	12.8 (55.0)	13.3 (55.9)	18.3 (64.9)	19.4 (66.9)	19.4 (66.9)	18.3 (64.9)	16.7 (62.1)	16.1 (61.0)	18.9 (66.0)	18.9 (66.0)	15.6 (60.1)	14.4 (57.9)	12.8 (55.0)
Average rainfall mm (inches)	18 (0.7)	33 (1.3)	97 (3.8)	168 (6.6)	213 (8.4)	302 (11.9)	320 (12.6)	211 (8.3)	318 (12.5)	241 (9.5)	76 (3.0)	15 (0.6)	2,012 (79.2)
Average rainy days (≥ 0.3 mm)	2	4	9	12	16	20	23	19	25	21	7	2	160
Average relative humidity (%)	84	81	84	85	87	90	93	92	91	89	86	84	87
Mean monthly sunshine hours	179.8	178.0	173.6	177.0	176.7	144.0	99.2	89.9	81.0	148.8	192.0	213.9	1,853.9
Mean daily sunshine hours	5.8	6.3	5.6	5.9	5.7	4.8	3.2	2.9	2.7	4.8	6.4	6.9	5.1
Source: Deutscher Wetterdienst

Climate data for Kano (1981-2010)
Month	Jan	Feb	Mar	Apr	May	Jun	Jul	Aug	Sep	Oct	Nov	Dec	Year
Mean daily maximum °C (°F)	29.0 (84.2)	32.4 (90.3)	36.4 (97.5)	39.1 (102.4)	37.1 (98.8)	35.4 (95.7)	32.0 (89.6)	30.9 (87.6)	32.3 (90.1)	34.5 (94.1)	33.1 (91.6)	29.9 (85.8)	33.5 (92.3)
Mean daily minimum °C (°F)	13.7 (56.7)	16.2 (61.2)	20.4 (68.7)	24.5 (76.1)	25.0 (77.0)	23.7 (74.7)	22.1 (71.8)	21.2 (70.2)	21.9 (71.4)	21.2 (70.2)	17.1 (62.8)	14.2 (57.6)	20.1 (68.2)
Average rainfall mm (inches)	0.0 (0.0)	0.7 (0.03)	1.9 (0.07)	8.1 (0.32)	71.3 (2.81)	118.7 (4.67)	209.0 (8.23)	311.2 (12.25)	137.0 (5.39)	14.1 (0.56)	1.0 (0.04)	0.0 (0.0)	873 (34.37)
Average rainy days	0	0	1	2	8	11	17	21	14	2	1	0	72
Average relative humidity (%) (at 15:00 LST)	17.0	13.2	13.2	19.1	29.5	44.5	58.9	63.6	55.0	30.1	18.1	17.4	31.6
Mean monthly sunshine hours	244.9	232.4	238.7	234.0	263.5	261.0	229.4	220.1	240.0	266.6	264.0	260.4	2,955
Mean daily sunshine hours	7.9	8.3	7.7	7.8	8.5	8.7	7.4	7.1	8.0	8.6	8.8	8.4	8.1
Source 1: World Meteorological Organization & Danish Meteorological Institute (rainfall & rain days)
Source 2: NOAA (sun and relative humidity, 1961–1990)

Climate data for Maiduguri (1961-1990 normals)
Month	Jan	Feb	Mar	Apr	May	Jun	Jul	Aug	Sep	Oct	Nov	Dec	Year
Record high °C (°F)	40 (104)	42 (108)	44 (111)	46 (115)	47 (117)	42 (108)	43 (109)	36 (97)	38 (100)	39 (102)	39 (102)	38 (100)	47 (117)
Mean daily maximum °C (°F)	31.9 (89.4)	34.6 (94.3)	37.8 (100.0)	40.1 (104.2)	39.4 (102.9)	36.4 (97.5)	33.2 (91.8)	32.0 (89.6)	33.7 (92.7)	36.4 (97.5)	34.2 (93.6)	32.3 (90.1)	35.2 (95.4)
Daily mean °C (°F)	21.8 (71.2)	24.8 (76.6)	29.3 (84.7)	32.6 (90.7)	32.5 (90.5)	30.2 (86.4)	27.5 (81.5)	26.6 (79.9)	27.2 (81.0)	27.9 (82.2)	24.9 (76.8)	23.2 (73.8)	27.4 (81.3)
Mean daily minimum °C (°F)	12.6 (54.7)	15.3 (59.5)	19.7 (67.5)	21.9 (71.4)	25.5 (77.9)	24.5 (76.1)	22.9 (73.2)	22.3 (72.1)	22.4 (72.3)	20.7 (69.3)	16.0 (60.8)	13.1 (55.6)	19.9 (67.8)
Record low °C (°F)	8 (46)	10 (50)	15 (59)	12 (54)	18 (64)	19 (66)	20 (68)	19 (66)	20 (68)	15 (59)	10 (50)	5 (41)	5 (41)
Average precipitation mm (inches)	0.0 (0.0)	0.0 (0.0)	0.3 (0.01)	13.0 (0.51)	30.5 (1.20)	73.8 (2.91)	147.1 (5.79)	193.2 (7.61)	83.0 (3.27)	11.1 (0.44)	0.0 (0.0)	0.1 (0.00)	552.1 (21.74)
Average precipitation days (≥ 1.0 mm)	0.0	0.0	0.5	1.6	4.0	7.0	10.7	10.7	6.8	1.4	0.0	0.0	42.7
Average relative humidity (%) (at 15:00 LST)	15.4	11.2	12.0	17.5	28.4	38.4	55.5	63.4	54.8	30.2	19.0	19.6	30.2
Mean monthly sunshine hours	266.6	249.2	257.3	237.0	263.5	249.0	217.0	204.6	225.0	285.2	282.0	275.9	3,012.3
Mean daily sunshine hours	8.6	8.9	8.3	7.9	8.5	8.3	7.0	6.6	7.5	9.2	9.4	8.9	8.3
Source 1: NOAA, Climate Charts (latitude: 11°51'N; longitude: 013°05'E; elevation: 354m, 1161')
Source 2: Voodoo Skies for record temperatures

Climate data for Ibadan
Month	Jan	Feb	Mar	Apr	May	Jun	Jul	Aug	Sep	Oct	Nov	Dec	Year
Record high °C (°F)	37.2 (99.0)	38.9 (102.0)	38.3 (100.9)	37.2 (99.0)	35.0 (95.0)	33.3 (91.9)	31.7 (89.1)	31.7 (89.1)	35.6 (96.1)	33.3 (91.9)	33.9 (93.0)	35.6 (96.1)	38.9 (102.0)
Mean daily maximum °C (°F)	32.3 (90.1)	34.0 (93.2)	33.5 (92.3)	32.3 (90.1)	31.2 (88.2)	29.6 (85.3)	27.8 (82.0)	27.2 (81.0)	28.5 (83.3)	29.7 (85.5)	31.3 (88.3)	31.9 (89.4)	30.8 (87.4)
Daily mean °C (°F)	25.7 (78.3)	26.9 (80.4)	26.9 (80.4)	26.3 (79.3)	25.6 (78.1)	25.1 (77.2)	23.6 (74.5)	23.1 (73.6)	23.9 (75.0)	24.3 (75.7)	25.6 (78.1)	25.5 (77.9)	25.2 (77.4)
Mean daily minimum °C (°F)	20.9 (69.6)	21.9 (71.4)	22.5 (72.5)	22.0 (71.6)	21.7 (71.1)	21.6 (70.9)	21.2 (70.2)	20.7 (69.3)	21.8 (71.2)	21.7 (71.1)	21.6 (70.9)	20.7 (69.3)	21.5 (70.7)
Record low °C (°F)	10.0 (50.0)	11.1 (52.0)	15.0 (59.0)	18.3 (64.9)	17.8 (64.0)	17.8 (64.0)	16.1 (61.0)	15.6 (60.1)	17.2 (63.0)	17.8 (64.0)	15.6 (60.1)	11.1 (52.0)	10.0 (50.0)
Average rainfall mm (inches)	10 (0.4)	25 (1.0)	91 (3.6)	135 (5.3)	152 (6.0)	188 (7.4)	155 (6.1)	86 (3.4)	175 (6.9)	160 (6.3)	46 (1.8)	10 (0.4)	1,233 (48.5)
Average rainy days (≥ 0.3 mm)	1	3	7	9	14	17	15	13	18	18	7	1	123
Average relative humidity (%)	76	73	77	82	85	87	89	88	88	87	83	79	83
Mean monthly sunshine hours	198.4	197.8	186.0	180.0	195.3	147.0	86.8	65.1	93.0	164.3	207.0	220.1	1,940.8
Mean daily sunshine hours	6.4	7.0	6.0	6.0	6.3	4.9	2.8	2.1	3.1	5.3	6.9	7.1	5.3
Source: Deutscher Wetterdienst

Climate data for Jos (1961–1990 normals)
Month	Jan	Feb	Mar	Apr	May	Jun	Jul	Aug	Sep	Oct	Nov	Dec	Year
Mean daily maximum °C (°F)	27.3 (81.1)	28.7 (83.7)	30.4 (86.7)	30.2 (86.4)	28.2 (82.8)	26.6 (79.9)	24.4 (75.9)	24.3 (75.7)	26.1 (79.0)	27.8 (82.0)	28.0 (82.4)	27.2 (81.0)	27.4 (81.3)
Daily mean °C (°F)	21.3 (70.3)	22.9 (73.2)	24.9 (76.8)	25.7 (78.3)	24.5 (76.1)	22.7 (72.9)	21.4 (70.5)	20.9 (69.6)	21.9 (71.4)	22.9 (73.2)	22.7 (72.9)	21.5 (70.7)	22.8 (73.0)
Mean daily minimum °C (°F)	12.7 (54.9)	15.1 (59.2)	17.7 (63.9)	18.3 (64.9)	18.0 (64.4)	17.2 (63.0)	16.7 (62.1)	16.5 (61.7)	16.7 (62.1)	16.3 (61.3)	14.4 (57.9)	13.1 (55.6)	16.1 (61.0)
Average precipitation mm (inches)	0.4 (0.02)	2.8 (0.11)	29.8 (1.17)	92.9 (3.66)	159.8 (6.29)	198.5 (7.81)	303.8 (11.96)	290.1 (11.42)	197.6 (7.78)	38.3 (1.51)	0.3 (0.01)	0.5 (0.02)	1,314.8 (51.76)
Average precipitation days (≥ 0.1 mm)	0.1	0.2	1.4	6.9	11.6	15.6	20.6	19.9	16.2	4.0	0.1	0.1	96.7
Average relative humidity (%)	14.1	13.6	19.6	38.7	58.3	66.0	75.8	76.2	64.2	42.0	20.8	16.5	42.1
Mean monthly sunshine hours	282.1	254.8	238.7	204.0	204.6	198.0	158.1	139.5	177.0	238.7	285.0	288.3	2,668.8
Mean daily sunshine hours	9.1	9.1	7.7	6.8	6.6	6.6	5.1	4.5	5.9	7.7	9.5	9.3	7.3
Source 1: NOAA
Source 2: Climate-Data.orgJos (altitude: 1185m, mean temperatures)

Climate data for Sokoto (1981–2010)
Month	Jan	Feb	Mar	Apr	May	Jun	Jul	Aug	Sep	Oct	Nov	Dec	Year
Mean daily maximum °C (°F)	32.1 (89.8)	34.8 (94.6)	38.6 (101.5)	40.6 (105.1)	39.0 (102.2)	36.2 (97.2)	32.8 (91.0)	31.3 (88.3)	32.8 (91.0)	36.0 (96.8)	36.1 (97.0)	32.9 (91.2)	35.3 (95.5)
Daily mean °C (°F)	24.5 (76.1)	27.1 (80.8)	31.2 (88.2)	33.7 (92.7)	33.1 (91.6)	30.9 (87.6)	28.2 (82.8)	27.2 (81.0)	28.0 (82.4)	29.7 (85.5)	28.3 (82.9)	25.3 (77.5)	28.9 (84.1)
Mean daily minimum °C (°F)	16.9 (62.4)	19.4 (66.9)	23.8 (74.8)	26.9 (80.4)	27.3 (81.1)	25.6 (78.1)	23.6 (74.5)	23.1 (73.6)	23.2 (73.8)	23.4 (74.1)	20.5 (68.9)	17.7 (63.9)	22.6 (72.7)
Average rainfall mm (inches)	0.0 (0.0)	0.1 (0.00)	1.5 (0.06)	4.8 (0.19)	46.5 (1.83)	80.0 (3.15)	186.6 (7.35)	200.5 (7.89)	109.8 (4.32)	17.2 (0.68)	0.0 (0.0)	0.0 (0.0)	647 (25.47)
Average rainy days (≥ 0.2 mm)	0	0	0	1	4	7	11	14	8	2	0	0	47
Average relative humidity (%)	24	19	21	34	50	62	76	83	80	64	36	27	48
Mean monthly sunshine hours	288.3	268.4	275.9	255.0	272.8	279.0	229.4	186.0	237.0	303.8	300.0	300.7	3,196.3
Mean daily sunshine hours	9.3	9.5	8.9	8.5	8.8	9.3	7.4	6.0	7.9	9.8	10.0	9.7	8.8
Source 1: World Meteorological Organization
Source 2: Deutscher Wetterdienst (humidity, 1951–1965 and sun, 1952–1961)

Climate data for Bayelsa State
Month	Jan	Feb	Mar	Apr	May	Jun	Jul	Aug	Sep	Oct	Nov	Dec	Year
Record high °C (°F)	40.0 (104.0)	42.0 (107.6)	39.0 (102.2)	39.0 (102.2)	38.0 (100.4)	36.0 (96.8)	32.0 (89.6)	32.0 (89.6)	34.0 (93.2)	34.0 (93.2)	36.0 (96.8)	39.0 (102.2)	42.0 (107.6)
Mean daily maximum °C (°F)	35.69 (96.24)	34.42 (93.96)	33.5 (92.3)	33.54 (92.37)	32.48 (90.46)	30.14 (86.25)	28.52 (83.34)	28.65 (83.57)	29.18 (84.52)	30.72 (87.30)	32.53 (90.55)	34.39 (93.90)	31.98 (89.56)
Daily mean °C (°F)	30.8 (87.4)	30.41 (86.74)	30.0 (86.0)	29.96 (85.93)	29.13 (84.43)	27.42 (81.36)	26.28 (79.30)	26.35 (79.43)	26.73 (80.11)	27.65 (81.77)	28.91 (84.04)	29.98 (85.96)	28.64 (83.55)
Mean daily minimum °C (°F)	24.19 (75.54)	25.26 (77.47)	25.77 (78.39)	25.71 (78.28)	25.2 (77.4)	24.08 (75.34)	23.53 (74.35)	23.5 (74.3)	23.78 (74.80)	24.13 (75.43)	24.72 (76.50)	24.38 (75.88)	24.52 (76.14)
Record low °C (°F)	19.0 (66.2)	21.0 (69.8)	22.0 (71.6)	24.0 (75.2)	22.0 (71.6)	20.0 (68.0)	19.0 (66.2)	20.0 (68.0)	19.0 (66.2)	20.0 (68.0)	21.0 (69.8)	20.0 (68.0)	19.0 (66.2)
Average rainfall mm (inches)	56.33 (2.22)	127.78 (5.03)	182.43 (7.18)	226.58 (8.92)	302.0 (11.89)	339.79 (13.38)	388.13 (15.28)	293.59 (11.56)	379.35 (14.94)	340.96 (13.42)	204.2 (8.04)	57.05 (2.25)	2,898.19 (114.11)
Average rainy days (≥ 1.0 mm)	10.45	19.09	27.45	26.27	27.82	29.09	30.27	28.0	29.27	29.09	26.91	12.45	296.16
Average relative humidity (%)	64.94	73.23	77.34	78.4	81.11	85.19	86.07	83.96	85.37	84.72	81.46	68.96	79.23
Source: tcktcktck

Climate data for Afikpo
Month	Jan	Feb	Mar	Apr	May	Jun	Jul	Aug	Sep	Oct	Nov	Dec	Year
Mean daily maximum °C (°F)	32.6 (90.7)	33.8 (92.8)	33.8 (92.8)	33.4 (92.1)	32 (90)	30.8 (87.4)	29.3 (84.7)	28.6 (83.5)	29.9 (85.8)	30.8 (87.4)	32.1 (89.8)	32.6 (90.7)	31.6 (89.0)
Daily mean °C (°F)	27.5 (81.5)	28.5 (83.3)	29 (84)	28.7 (83.7)	27.6 (81.7)	26.7 (80.1)	25.4 (77.7)	25.6 (78.1)	26 (79)	26.6 (79.9)	27.4 (81.3)	27.4 (81.3)	27.2 (81.0)
Mean daily minimum °C (°F)	22.5 (72.5)	23.2 (73.8)	24.2 (75.6)	24 (75)	23.3 (73.9)	22.6 (72.7)	22.2 (72.0)	22.7 (72.9)	22.2 (72.0)	22.4 (72.3)	22.8 (73.0)	22.3 (72.1)	22.9 (73.1)
Average precipitation mm (inches)	19 (0.7)	34 (1.3)	84 (3.3)	159 (6.3)	247 (9.7)	261 (10.3)	303 (11.9)	270 (10.6)	309 (12.2)	269 (10.6)	57 (2.2)	10 (0.4)	2,022 (79.5)
Source: Climate-Data.org (altitude: 62m)

== Climate change ==
Over the years, Nigeria has slowly become prone to various hazards due to change in climate. With the southern and coastal places at a risk of flooding due to rising sea levels. Further, they are also threatened with waterborne disease and vulnerable to more. States in the northern part of the country are experiencing higher temperatures, lesser rainfalls and are threatened by drought, famine, and food scarcity.

=== Climate action ===
Nigeria joined the UN Environment's Climate and Clean Air Coalition in 2012 with the vision of reducing short-lived climate pollutants across ten high-impact sectors.

Nigeria's Nationally Determined Contribution (NDC) was made with a pledge to reduce GHG emissions by 45 percent conditionally by 2030 after Nigeria adopted the Paris Agreement under the President Buhari regime. Nigeria further passed the Climate Change Bill in November 2021. A bill which shows the country's commitment to a long-term vision of a net zero target for 2050 to 2070.

== Extra ==
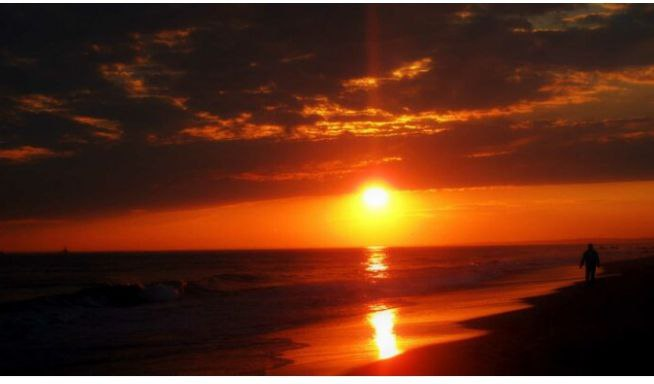

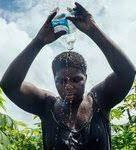
A woman pouring water on her head to reduce high body temperature

According to Nigerian Meteorological Agency (NIMET), Nigeria, with an annual mean temperature of 26.9 °C has Air pollution remains a significant environmental and public health concern in Nigeria. However, there are still considerable gaps in data collection, research infrastructure, and effective policy implementation. Recent studies have highlighted emerging trends and persistent challenges in air quality monitoring and governance, emphasizing the need for improved infrastructure and stronger policy responses to mitigate public health risks experienced heatwave with temperatures above 35 °C and with high occurrence rates in the northern part of the country. The northern part is more vulnerable to heat waves due to the hot semi-arid climate. In 2019, Nigeria experienced a heatwave with northern states experiencing high occurrences as Minna had a temperature of 42.2 °C. With 46.4 °C in 2010, the Nigerian city Yola had the highest recorded temperature in the list of countries and territories affected by extreme temperatures.

=== Floods ===
During the wet season, it is not unusual to experience rainfalls that can cause flooding in some parts of the nation. In 2012, the country experienced its worst in 40 years with an estimated loss of N2.6 trillion. A total of 363 people were killed and over 2,100,000 displaced.

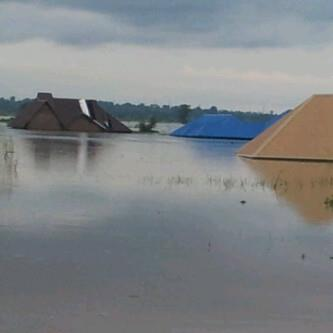
Houses submerged in Makurdi, Nigeria due to the flooding

The 2017 flooding that occurred during the rainy season in Benue state was another disaster that displaced a thousand people. In 2021, 32 out of Nigeria's 36 states had cases of flooding according to the National Emergency Management Agency, reporting 155 lives lost between August and October.

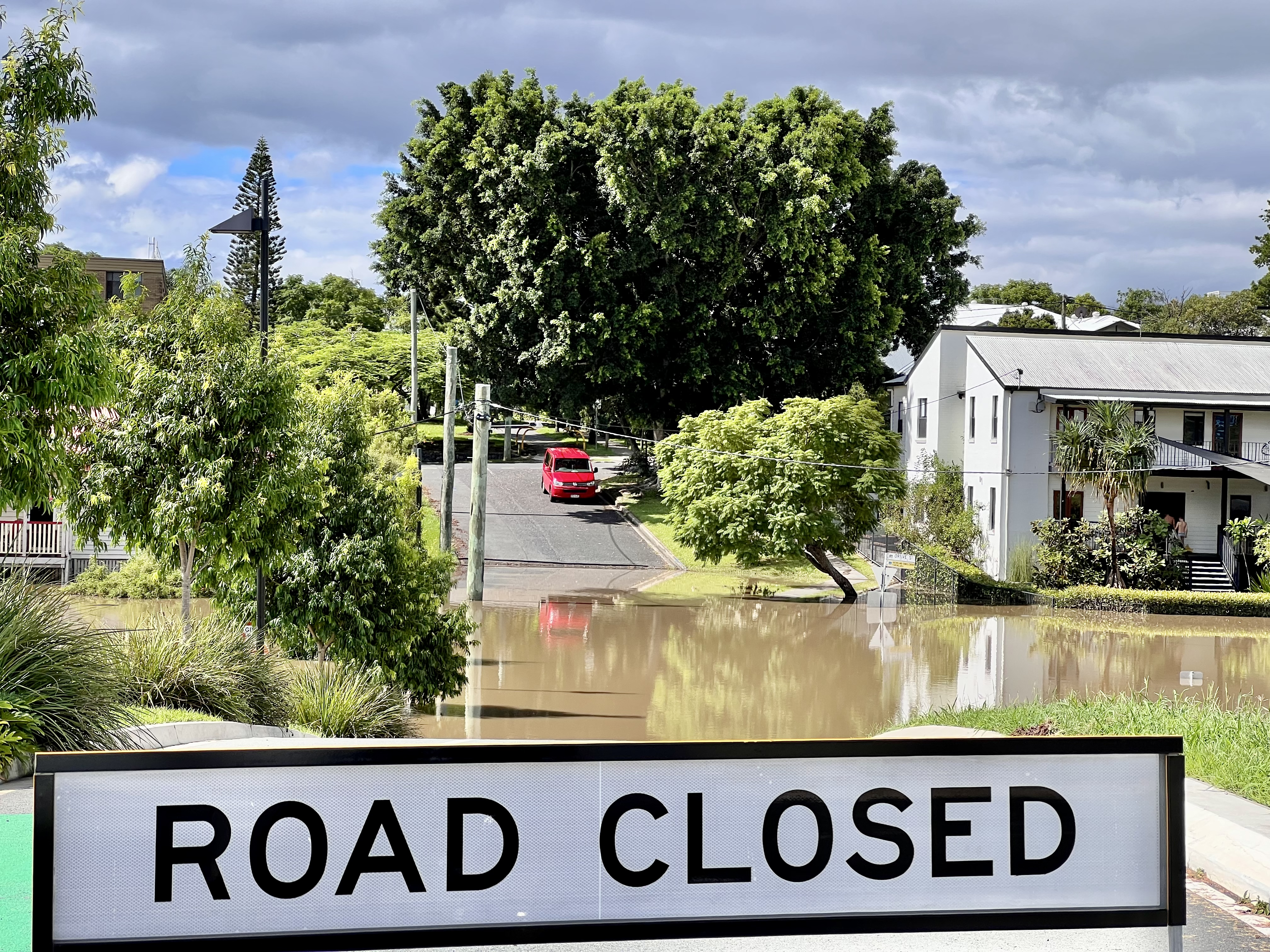

=== Droughts ===
Nigeria was also among the affected countries that suffered severe famine in the 2012 Sahel drought.

Prolonged drought in Nigeria has led to desertification and land scarcity for farming and livestock. This forces farmers and herders to migrate to new areas, often resulting in violent conflicts, with over 2,000 casualties in 2018. Despite these challenges, some Plateau State residents are reluctant to leave, rebuilding their communities after destruction. Satellite images from NASA reveal severe desertification, affecting about 900,000 km^{2} (350,000 mi^{2}; 220,000,000 acres; 90,000,000 ha) of savanna grassland between the 1960s and 1986.

Drought is a recurring issue in Nigeria, particularly in the arid north, with historical famines documented in various years. A recent survey by SBMIntel found that 79% of Nigerian farmers were impacted by drought and flooding in 2020, with 26.3% experiencing significant harvest disruptions. This poses a threat to national food security.

== See also ==
- 2020 African Sahel floods
- Drought in Nigeria
- Geography of Nigeria
- Sustainable Development Goals and Nigeria
- Heatwaves in Nigeria
