= Diphtheria in Nigeria =

Health issues in Nigeria

Diphtheria, an infection caused by Corynebacterium diphtheriae, has caused multiple outbreaks in Nigeria, including in 2011, 2022, 2023, and 2024.

== 2011 outbreak ==
The 2011 outbreak was limited to Borno State, with 98 cases and 21 fatalities being reported.

== 2023-2025 outbreak ==
An outbreak of diphtheria in Kano State in northern Nigeria was reported in late December 2022. From 2 July 2023, Nigeria experienced an unusual increase in diphtheria cases across multiple states. Between 30 June and 31 August 2023, a total of 5,898 suspected cases were reported across 59 Local Government Areas (LGAs) in 11 states. By 27 August 2023, 234 additional suspected cases were recorded in 20 LGAs across five states. Laboratory confirmation was obtained for one case from 22 collected samples, while 18 cases were epidemiologically linked, and 141 were classified as clinically compatible.

By October 2023, 14,000 cases had been reported and over 600 people had died from the outbreak, with more than 500 of the deaths occurring in Kano State. Other states that were heavily impacted were Borno, Yobe, Katsina, Jigawa and Kaduna. Most of the deaths were children who had not been vaccinated against the disease. By February 2025, cases had risen to 24,864, and deaths to 1,264.

The World Health Organization (WHO) conducted a risk assessment of the outbreak, categorizing the risk level as high at the national level but low at regional and global levels. In response, the Nigeria Centre for Disease Control (NCDC), in collaboration with WHO and other health partners, has implemented public health interventions, including vaccination campaigns, enhanced disease surveillance for early detection, case management, and public awareness initiatives.

=== Responses and intervention ===
The outbreak of diphtheria in Nigeria has prompted an urgent response from health authorities, including the Nigeria Centre for Disease Control (NCDC) and the Federal Ministry of Health. Surveillance systems have been strengthened to detect and report new cases promptly, while rapid response teams have been deployed to affected areas to contain the spread. Vaccination campaigns have been intensified, especially in high risk communities, targeting unvaccinated children and adults. Public health education initiatives have also been launched to raise awareness about the symptoms, transmission, and prevention of diphtheria, emphasizing the importance of early medical intervention. Efforts have been made to improve laboratory capacity for quick and accurate diagnosis to facilitate timely treatment.

Intervention strategies have included the distribution of diphtheria antitoxin and antibiotics such as erythromycin and penicillin to health facilities treating infected individuals. In collaboration with international partners like the World Health Organization (WHO) and UNICEF, the government has secured additional vaccines and medical supplies to curb the outbreak. Contact tracing and isolation measures have been implemented to prevent further transmission, while healthcare workers have received special training on case management and infection control. Community engagement has played a crucial role in dispelling vaccine misinformation and encouraging compliance with routine immunization. Despite these efforts, challenges such as vaccine hesitancy, inadequate healthcare infrastructure, and difficult to reach communities continue to hinder full containment, necessitating sustained governmental and global support.

== See also ==
Heatwave in Nigeria
