= Geography of Nigeria =

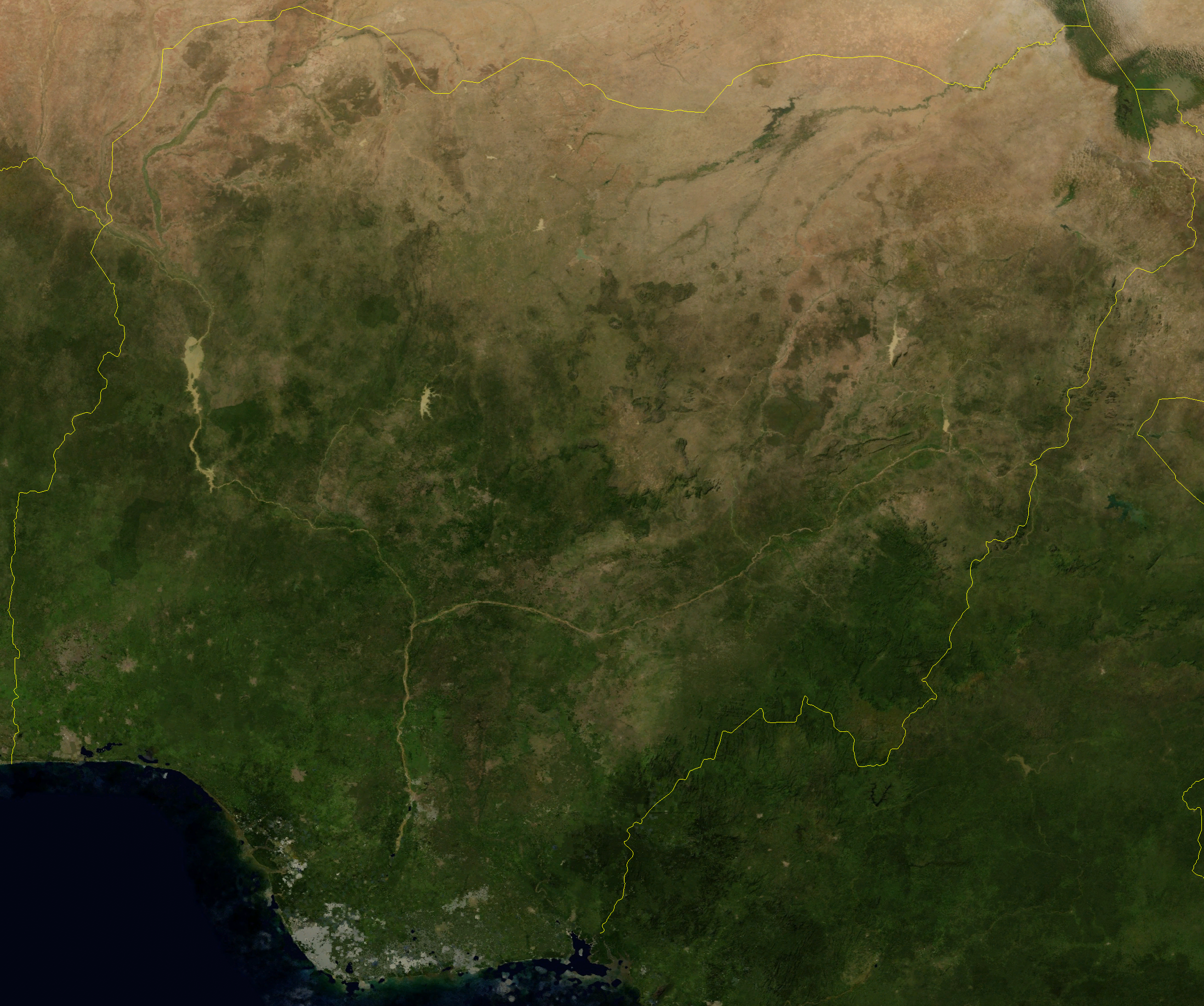
- Continent: Africa
- Region: West Africa
- Coordinates: 9.0820°N 8.6753°E
- Area: Ranked 31st
  - Total: 923,768 km^{2} (356,669 sq mi)
  - Land: 98.59%
  - Water: 1.41%
- Coastline: 853 km (530 mi)
- Borders: Total land borders: 4,047 km (2,515 mi); Cameroon: 1,690 km (1,050 mi); Niger: 1,497 km (930 mi); Benin: 773 km (480 mi); Chad: 87 km (54 mi); São Tomé and Príncipe: Maritime boundary, Gulf of Guinea; Equatorial Guinea: Maritime boundary, Gulf of Guinea
- Highest point: Chappal Waddi; 2,419 m (7,936 ft)
- Lowest point: Atlantic Ocean, 0 m (0 ft)
- Longest river: Niger River, 1,111.88 km (691 mi)
- Largest lake: Kainji Lake; 1,243 km^{2} (480 sq mi)
- Natural resources: petroleum, natural gas, tin, columbite, iron ore, coal, limestone, niobium, lead, zinc, arable land
- Natural hazards: drought, bush fire, landslide
- Environmental issues: air pollution, water pollution, oil spillage, lead exposures, poor waste management, deforestation, desertification, erosion, flooding
- Exclusive economic zone: 217,313 km^{2} (83,905 mi^{2})

Location of Nigeria

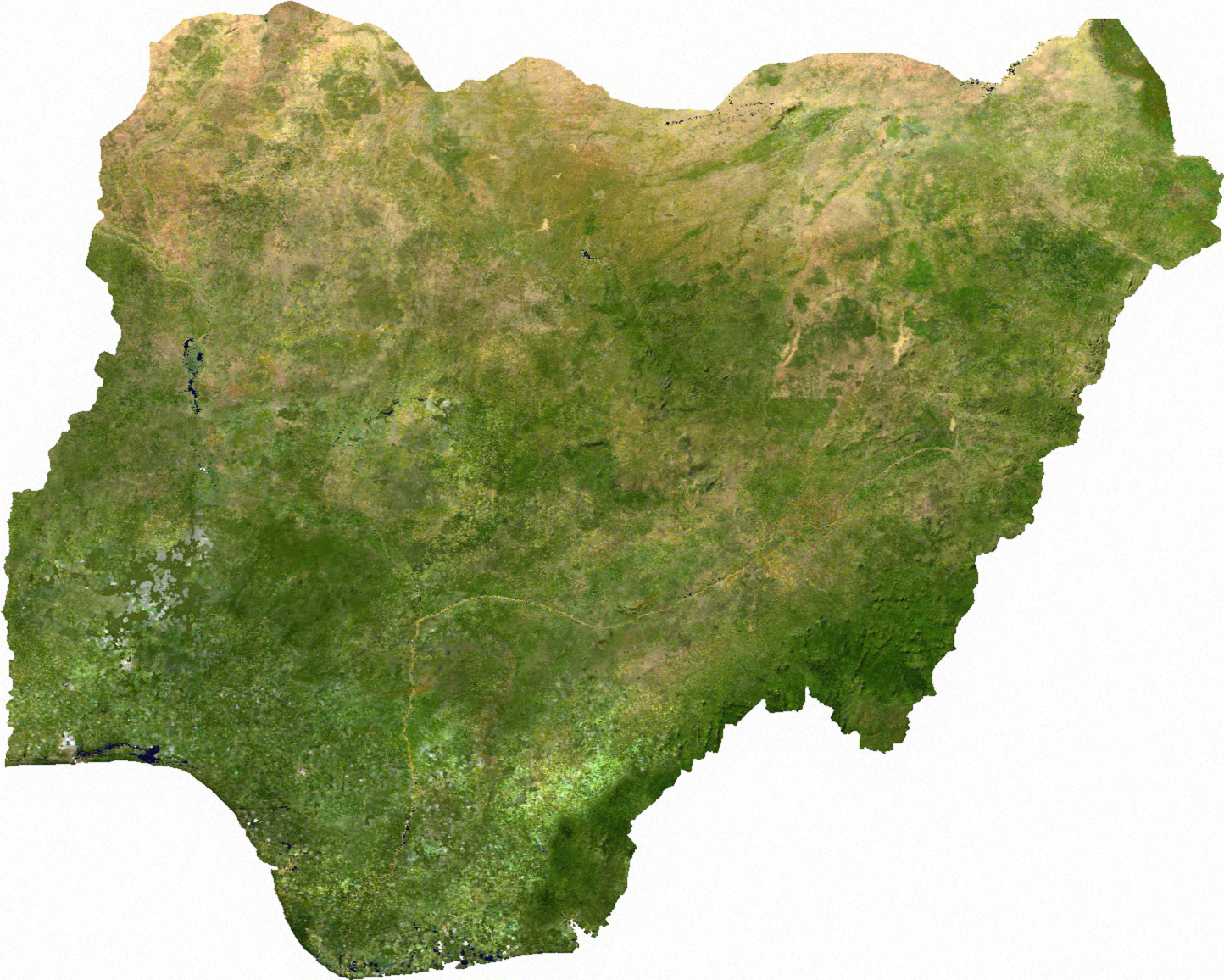
Satellite image of Nigeria

Nigeria is a country in West Africa. It shares land borders with the Republic of Benin to the west, Chad and Cameroon to the east, and Niger to the north. Its coast lies on the Gulf of Guinea in the south and it borders Lake Chad to the northeast. Notable geographical features in Nigeria include the Adamawa Plateau, Mambilla Plateau, Jos Plateau, Obudu Plateau, Niger River, Benue River, and Niger Delta.

Nigeria is in the tropics, where the climate is very humid and seasonally wet. Nigeria has majorly four climate types; these climate types are generally gradated from south to north. Nigeria's principal streams are the Niger, from which it got its name, and the Benue, the primary tributary of the Niger. The country's most elevated point is Chappal Waddi (or Gangirwal) at 2,419 metres or 7,936 feet, situated in the Adamawa mountains in the Gashaka-Gumti Public Park, Taraba State, on the border with Cameroon.

The capital of Nigeria is Abuja, situated in the centre of the country, while Lagos is the country's major port, monetary center and largest city. Communicated in dialects are English (official), Hausa, Igbo, and Yoruba. It is assessed that Nigeria has around 250 different ethno-etymological gatherings.

== Area data ==
Area
- Total: 923,768 km^{2} (356,669 sq mi)
  - country rank in the world: 31st
- Land: 910,770 km^{2} (351,650 sq mi)
- Water: 13,000 km^{2} (5,000 sq mi)

Area comparative
- Australia comparative: slightly smaller than South Australia
- Canada comparative: slightly smaller than British Columbia
- United States comparative: slightly less than three times the size of New Mexico

== Climate ==
The tropical monsoon climate, designated by the Köppen climate classification as Am, is found in the southern part of the country. This climate is influenced by the monsoons originating from the South Atlantic Ocean, which are brought into the country by the (maritime tropical) MT air mass, a warm moist sea-to-land seasonal wind. Its warmth and high humidity gives it a strong tendency to ascend and produce copious rainfall, which is a result of the condensation of water vapour in the rapidly rising air. The tropical monsoon climate has a very small temperature range. The temperature ranges are almost constant throughout the year; for example, Warri in the southern part of Nigeria records a maximum of 28 °C (82.4 °F) for its hottest month while its lowest temperature is 26 °C (78.8 °F) in its coldest month.

The southern part of Nigeria experiences heavy and abundant rainfall. These storms are usually convectional in nature because of the region's proximity to the equatorial belt. The annual rainfall received in this region is very high. Parts of the Niger Delta receives over 4,000 millimetres or 160 inches of annual rainfall, while the southeast receives between 2,000 and 3,000 millimetres (80 and 120 in). The southern region of Nigeria experiences a double rainfall maxima with two high peaks. The first rainy season starts in March, ending in June. The August break, a short dry season, follows, followed by a short rainy season in September and a long dry season in October.

Köppen climate classification map of Nigeria

The tropical savanna climate, characterized by distinct rainy and dry seasons, dominates western to central Nigeria. It has a single peak in the summer and consistently high temperatures above 18 °C or 64.4 °F. Abuja, Nigeria's capital, experiences a temperature range of 18.45 to 36.9 °C (65.2 to 98.4 °F). The dry season occurs from December to March and is hot and dry with the Harmattan wind, a continental tropical (CT) air mass laden with dust from the Sahara, prevailing throughout this period.

With the Intertropical Convergence Zone swinging northward over West Africa from the Southern Hemisphere in April, heavy showers coming from pre-monsoonal convective clouds mainly in the form of squall lines also known as the north easterlies formed mainly as a result of the interactions of the two dominant airmasses in Nigeria known as the maritime tropical (south westerlies) and the continental tropical (north easterlies), begins in central Nigeria while monsoons arrive in July, bringing with it high humidity, heavy cloud cover and heavy rainfall lasting until September when the monsoons gradually begin retreating southward to the southern part of Nigeria. Rainfall totals in central Nigeria varies from 1,100 mm (43.3 in) in the lowlands to over 2,000 mm (78.7 in) along the south western escarpment of the Jos Plateau.

A hot semi-arid climate (BSh) is predominant within the Sahel in the northern part of Nigeria. Annual rainfall totals are low. The rainy season in the northern part of Nigeria lasts for three to four months (June to September). The rest of the year is hot and dry with temperatures climbing as high as 40 °C (104.0 °F) . Potiskum, Yobe State in the northeast of Nigeria recorded Nigeria's lowest ever temperature of 2.8 °C (37.0 °F).

Highland climates are found on highlands regions in Nigeria. Highlands over 1,520 metres (4,987 ft) above sea level are cool enough to reach the temperate climate line in the tropics thereby giving the highlands, mountains and the plateau regions standing above this height, a cool mountain climate.

=== Annual rainfall ===
Rainfall in the coastal belt of the Niger Delta is heavy due to the closeness of the Delta region to the equator. Annual rainfall totals vary from 2,400 millimetres or 94 inches at Port Harcourt to as much as 4,870 millimetres or 192 inches at Forcados, a coastal town in the Niger Delta, 4,200 millimetres or 165 inches at Bonny, and 3,070 millimetres or 121 inches in Calabar, the rainiest city with over one million people in Nigeria. As one moves northward and eastward, annual rainfall declines steadily to around 650 millimetres or 26 inches at Sokoto in the northwest and as low as 400 millimetres or 16 inches in the extreme north of Yobe and Borno States, which under the sweltering conditions that prevail is dry enough to be a hot arid climate (Köppen BWh).

=== Trade winds ===
==== Tropical maritime air mass ====
The tropical maritime air mass (MT) is responsible for Nigeria's rainy season. This wind begins in February in the southern part of Nigeria while it takes longer for the wind to fully cover the whole of the country, reaching the northern part of Nigeria in June. Its presence a result of the northward retreat of the Harmattan. The northward retreat of the tropical continental air mass (CT) is caused by the sun's northward shift from the tropic of capricorn in the southern hemisphere to the tropic of cancer in the northern hemisphere. This shift begins from February and ends in June, when the sun is fully overhead at the tropic of cancer. During this northward migration of the sun as a result of the earth tilting along its axis, the sun crosses the equator (around March), moving over West Africa. West Africa comes directly under the sun at this time. The whole of West Africa is heated intensely as result of the increased insolation. Temperatures can climb as high as 35 °C (95.0 °F) over West Africa during this time. Temperatures in the northern part of Nigeria can go as high as 48 °C (118.4 °F) in cities like Maiduguri.

High temperatures and increased insolation cause low pressure in West Africa and Nigeria between March and May. The Saharan continental air mass weakens due to land surface overheating, causing the atmosphere to expand and become lighter. The air mass retreats, and the sun's rays enter Nigeria's atmosphere more intensely than during Harmattan. The heating of the West Africa land mass creates a low pressure region over West Africa. This low pressure zone aid in the development of the tropical maritime air mass from the south Atlantic.

The tropical maritime air mass is a warm, humid and unstable trade wind. Convection currents form within the airmass whenever there is little instability in the airmass as a result of a slight to a very high orographic uplift in mountainous regions like the Obudu Plateau or the heating of the land which can trigger the formation of cumulonimbus cloud leading to thunderstorms within the air mass. During the dominance of the tropical maritime air mass, mornings are bright and sunny, the sun's heating of the land in the mornings and afternoons sets up convectional currents, these currents rise vertically, cumulonimbus clouds are formed, and torrential downpours can occur in the afternoon.

The African easterly wave is another major contributor of rainfall during the summer monsoons months of May to September. The nature of this wave changes at about 15 degrees north latitude. The waves that pass south of this latitude carry moisture and create convection that leads to rain clouds. Nigeria's location in the wetter part of the easterly waves south of the 15 degrees north latitude creates wetter climatic conditions for Nigeria, especially during the monsoons.

==== Tropical continental air mass ====
The tropical continental air mass, locally known as the Harmattan, is a wind originating from North Africa which crosses the Sahara into West Africa. Nigeria's dry season from December to March is dominated by a dusty tropical continental air mass, which creates a haze and hinders visibility. Originating near the equator, it generates dust rather than precipitation. Despite its impact on transportation, the low humidity helps farmers dry their crops.

=== Temperature ===
Nigeria's seasons and temperature variance are determined by rainfall with rainy season and dry season being the major seasons in Nigeria. The rainy season of Nigeria brings in slightly cooler weather to the country as a result of an increased cloud cover that acts as a blockage of the intense sunshine of the tropics by blocking much of the Sun's rays in the rainy season (and trapping some heat in the ground, making it not too cold); this in turn cools the land, and the winds above the ground remain cool thereby making for cooler temperatures during the rainy season. Despite the temperatures being cooler in the rainy season, the rainy season also has an increased temperature at night compared to the dry season. Also afternoons in the rainy season can be hot and humid. In the rainy season it is damp, and the rainfalls are usually abundant.

The dry season of Nigeria is a period of less cloud cover in the southern part of Nigeria to virtually no cloud cover in the northern part of Nigeria. The Sun shines through the atmosphere with little obstructions from the clear skies making the dry season in Nigeria a period of warmer weather conditions. In the middle of the dry season around December, the dust brought in by the Harmattan partially blocks the sun's rays, which lowers temperatures. But with the withdrawal of this wind around March to April following the onset of the rainy season, temperatures can go as high as 44 °C (111.2 °F) in some parts of Nigeria.

Semi-temperate weather conditions prevail on the highlands in central Nigeria above 1,200 metres (3,937 ft) above sea level, namely the Jos Plateau. Temperatures on the Jos plateau ranges between 16 and 25 °C (61 and 77 °F) which are cool all year round. Temperate weather conditions occur on the highlands along the Nigeria Cameroon border, in the eastern part of Nigeria. Highlands in these region attain an average height of more than 1,524 m (5,000 ft) to some standing above 2,000 metres (6,562 ft) above sea level. The climate on these highlands is temperate all year round. The major highlands in this region are the Obudu Plateau above 1,584 m (5,197 ft), Mambilla Plateau above 1,524 m (5,000 ft) and Mt. Chappal Waddi above 2,000 m (6,562 ft).

=== Examples ===
Climate data for Bayelsa State
Month	Jan	Feb	Mar	Apr	May	Jun	Jul	Aug	Sep	Oct	Nov	Dec	Year
Record high °C (°F)	40.0 (104.0)	42.0 (107.6)	39.0 (102.2)	39.0 (102.2)	38.0 (100.4)	36.0 (96.8)	32.0 (89.6)	32.0 (89.6)	34.0 (93.2)	34.0 (93.2)	36.0 (96.8)	39.0 (102.2)	42.0 (107.6)
Mean daily maximum °C (°F)	35.69 (96.24)	34.42 (93.96)	33.5 (92.3)	33.54 (92.37)	32.48 (90.46)	30.14 (86.25)	28.52 (83.34)	28.65 (83.57)	29.18 (84.52)	30.72 (87.30)	32.53 (90.55)	34.39 (93.90)	31.98 (89.56)
Daily mean °C (°F)	30.8 (87.4)	30.41 (86.74)	30.0 (86.0)	29.96 (85.93)	29.13 (84.43)	27.42 (81.36)	26.28 (79.30)	26.35 (79.43)	26.73 (80.11)	27.65 (81.77)	28.91 (84.04)	29.98 (85.96)	28.64 (83.55)
Mean daily minimum °C (°F)	24.19 (75.54)	25.26 (77.47)	25.77 (78.39)	25.71 (78.28)	25.2 (77.4)	24.08 (75.34)	23.53 (74.35)	23.5 (74.3)	23.78 (74.80)	24.13 (75.43)	24.72 (76.50)	24.38 (75.88)	24.52 (76.14)
Record low °C (°F)	19.0 (66.2)	21.0 (69.8)	22.0 (71.6)	24.0 (75.2)	22.0 (71.6)	20.0 (68.0)	19.0 (66.2)	20.0 (68.0)	19.0 (66.2)	20.0 (68.0)	21.0 (69.8)	20.0 (68.0)	19.0 (66.2)
Average rainfall mm (inches)	56.33 (2.22)	127.78 (5.03)	182.43 (7.18)	226.58 (8.92)	302.0 (11.89)	339.79 (13.38)	388.13 (15.28)	293.59 (11.56)	379.35 (14.94)	340.96 (13.42)	204.2 (8.04)	57.05 (2.25)	2,898.19 (114.11)
Average rainy days (≥ 1.0 mm)	10.45	19.09	27.45	26.27	27.82	29.09	30.27	28.0	29.27	29.09	26.91	12.45	296.16
Average relative humidity (%)	64.94	73.23	77.34	78.4	81.11	85.19	86.07	83.96	85.37	84.72	81.46	68.96	79.23
Source: tcktcktck

Climate data for Ebenebe
Month	Jan	Feb	Mar	Apr	May	Jun	Jul	Aug	Sep	Oct	Nov	Dec	Year
Mean daily maximum °C (°F)	32.6 (90.7)	33.8 (92.8)	33.9 (93.0)	33.5 (92.3)	32 (90)	30.4 (86.7)	29 (84)	28.1 (82.6)	29.6 (85.3)	30.8 (87.4)	32.3 (90.1)	32.8 (91.0)	31.6 (88.8)
Mean daily minimum °C (°F)	27.4 (81.3)	28.4 (83.1)	29 (84)	28.7 (83.7)	27.6 (81.7)	26.3 (79.3)	25.6 (78.1)	25.2 (77.4)	25.8 (78.4)	26.5 (79.7)	27.5 (81.5)	27.3 (81.1)	27.1 (80.8)
Average precipitation mm (inches)	3 (0.1)	35 (1.4)	17 (0.7)	100 (3.9)	150 (5.9)	78 (3.1)	125 (4.9)	80 (3.1)	50 (2.0)	222 (8.7)	106 (4.2)	0 (0)	966 (38)
Average rainy days	2	2	4	5	5	5	10	7	5	12	6	0	63
Source: Climate-data.org

Climate data for Lagos (Murtala Muhammed International Airport) 1961–1990, extremes: 1886–present
Month	Jan	Feb	Mar	Apr	May	Jun	Jul	Aug	Sep	Oct	Nov	Dec	Year
Record high °C (°F)	40.0 (104.0)	37.1 (98.8)	37.0 (98.6)	39.6 (103.3)	37.0 (98.6)	37.6 (99.7)	33.2 (91.8)	33.0 (91.4)	33.2 (91.8)	33.7 (92.7)	39.9 (103.8)	36.4 (97.5)	40.0 (104.0)
Mean daily maximum °C (°F)	32.2 (90.0)	33.2 (91.8)	32.9 (91.2)	32.2 (90.0)	30.9 (87.6)	29.3 (84.7)	28.2 (82.8)	28.3 (82.9)	28.9 (84.0)	30.3 (86.5)	31.4 (88.5)	31.8 (89.2)	30.8 (87.4)
Daily mean °C (°F)	27.3 (81.1)	28.4 (83.1)	28.5 (83.3)	28.0 (82.4)	27.0 (80.6)	25.6 (78.1)	25.2 (77.4)	25.0 (77.0)	25.5 (77.9)	26.4 (79.5)	27.2 (81.0)	27.2 (81.0)	26.8 (80.2)
Mean daily minimum °C (°F)	22.4 (72.3)	23.7 (74.7)	24.1 (75.4)	23.7 (74.7)	23.2 (73.8)	21.9 (71.4)	22.3 (72.1)	21.8 (71.2)	22.1 (71.8)	22.4 (72.3)	23.0 (73.4)	22.5 (72.5)	22.8 (73.0)
Record low °C (°F)	12.6 (54.7)	16.1 (61.0)	14.0 (57.2)	14.9 (58.8)	20.0 (68.0)	21.2 (70.2)	15.0 (59.0)	19.0 (66.2)	13.0 (55.4)	17.9 (64.2)	11.1 (52.0)	11.6 (52.9)	11.1 (52.0)
Average precipitation mm (inches)	13.2 (0.52)	40.6 (1.60)	84.3 (3.32)	146.3 (5.76)	202.4 (7.97)	315.5 (12.42)	243.0 (9.57)	121.7 (4.79)	160.0 (6.30)	125.1 (4.93)	39.7 (1.56)	14.8 (0.58)	1,506.6 (59.31)
Average precipitation days (≥ 1.0 mm)	1.5	2.8	6.6	9.0	12.5	16.2	13.2	11.6	12.7	11.2	4.9	2.1	104.3
Average relative humidity (%)	81	79	76	82	84	87	87	85	86	87	84	82	83
Average dew point °C (°F)	21 (70)	24 (75)	25 (77)	25 (77)	24 (75)	24 (75)	23 (73)	23 (73)	24 (75)	24 (75)	24 (75)	23 (73)	24 (74)
Mean monthly sunshine hours	164.3	168.0	173.6	180.0	176.7	114.0	99.2	108.5	114.0	167.4	186.0	192.2	1,843.9
Mean daily sunshine hours	5.3	6.1	5.6	6.0	5.7	3.8	3.2	3.5	3.8	5.4	6.2	6.2	5.1
Source 1: Deutscher Wetterdienst (humidity, 1952–1967), NOAA (monthly sun hours)
Source 2: Meteo Climat (record highs and lows) Time and Date (dewpoints, 2005-2015) Weather Atlas (daily sun hours)

Climate data for Port Harcourt (1961-1990 normals)
Month	Jan	Feb	Mar	Apr	May	Jun	Jul	Aug	Sep	Oct	Nov	Dec	Year
Mean daily maximum °C (°F)	32.4 (90.3)	33.4 (92.1)	32.6 (90.7)	32.1 (89.8)	31.2 (88.2)	30.0 (86.0)	28.8 (83.8)	28.7 (83.7)	29.3 (84.7)	30.2 (86.4)	31.3 (88.3)	31.8 (89.2)	31.0 (87.8)
Mean daily minimum °C (°F)	21.2 (70.2)	22.5 (72.5)	23.3 (73.9)	23.2 (73.8)	23.2 (73.8)	22.7 (72.9)	22.4 (72.3)	22.4 (72.3)	22.4 (72.3)	22.4 (72.3)	22.4 (72.3)	21.4 (70.5)	22.5 (72.5)
Average rainfall mm (inches)	22.2 (0.87)	56.5 (2.22)	116.3 (4.58)	183.6 (7.23)	222.7 (8.77)	273.3 (10.76)	356.5 (14.04)	326.8 (12.87)	367.1 (14.45)	263.1 (10.36)	96.9 (3.81)	25.9 (1.02)	2,310.9 (90.98)
Average rainy days	2.2	4.6	8.6	11.6	14.2	16.5	19.7	19.8	20.1	14.4	5.9	2.1	139.7
Average relative humidity (%) (at 15:00 LST)	54.6	57.0	65.3	70.1	74.1	78.5	81.1	81.6	81.3	77.7	69.3	58.5	70.8
Mean monthly sunshine hours	142.6	123.2	114.7	132.0	139.5	102.0	77.5	74.4	78.0	102.3	132.0	148.8	1,367
Mean daily sunshine hours	4.6	4.4	3.7	4.4	4.5	3.4	2.5	2.4	2.6	3.3	4.4	4.8	3.7
Source 1: World Meteorological Organization
Source 2: NOAA (sun and relative humidity, 1961–1990)

Climate data for Abuja
Month	Jan	Feb	Mar	Apr	May	Jun	Jul	Aug	Sep	Oct	Nov	Dec	Year
Record high °C (°F)	36.0 (96.8)	38.4 (101.1)	39.7 (103.5)	39.0 (102.2)	39.3 (102.7)	34.0 (93.2)	32.0 (89.6)	31.2 (88.2)	31.0 (87.8)	35.0 (95.0)	37.9 (100.2)	37.6 (99.7)	39.7 (103.5)
Mean daily maximum °C (°F)	33.7 (92.7)	37.1 (98.8)	37.0 (98.6)	34.9 (94.8)	33.7 (92.7)	30.4 (86.7)	28.9 (84.0)	28.4 (83.1)	29.3 (84.7)	30.1 (86.2)	34.7 (94.5)	34.8 (94.6)	32.8 (91.0)
Daily mean °C (°F)	26.1 (79.0)	28.7 (83.7)	30.5 (86.9)	28.9 (84.0)	28.6 (83.5)	26.9 (80.4)	25.9 (78.6)	24.8 (76.6)	25.4 (77.7)	27.0 (80.6)	28.0 (82.4)	27.6 (81.7)	27.4 (81.3)
Mean daily minimum °C (°F)	19.2 (66.6)	22.2 (72.0)	25.4 (77.7)	24.5 (76.1)	24.4 (75.9)	23.4 (74.1)	23.1 (73.6)	22.4 (72.3)	22.7 (72.9)	23.6 (74.5)	21.1 (70.0)	20.8 (69.4)	22.7 (72.9)
Record low °C (°F)	15.0 (59.0)	18.6 (65.5)	20.0 (68.0)	21.7 (71.1)	21.6 (70.9)	20.8 (69.4)	20.3 (68.5)	20.0 (68.0)	20.0 (68.0)	21.6 (70.9)	17.0 (62.6)	17.0 (62.6)	15.0 (59.0)
Average rainfall mm (inches)	3 (0.1)	7 (0.3)	16 (0.6)	73 (2.9)	137 (5.4)	187 (7.4)	216 (8.5)	272 (10.7)	233 (9.2)	117 (4.6)	7 (0.3)	2 (0.1)	1,270 (50.1)
Average rainy days	0.1	0.2	1.3	3.2	9.4	10.3	13.0	17.2	15.9	8.0	0.3	0.1	79
Source: Deutscher Wetterdienst.

Climate data for Benin City
Month	Jan	Feb	Mar	Apr	May	Jun	Jul	Aug	Sep	Oct	Nov	Dec	Year
Record high °C (°F)	34.4 (93.9)	36.1 (97.0)	36.1 (97.0)	35.6 (96.1)	35.0 (95.0)	33.3 (91.9)	31.7 (89.1)	31.1 (88.0)	32.8 (91.0)	32.8 (91.0)	34.4 (93.9)	34.4 (93.9)	36.1 (97.0)
Mean daily maximum °C (°F)	31.9 (89.4)	33.3 (91.9)	33.0 (91.4)	32.4 (90.3)	31.6 (88.9)	29.9 (85.8)	27.9 (82.2)	27.9 (82.2)	28.8 (83.8)	30.3 (86.5)	31.8 (89.2)	32.0 (89.6)	30.9 (87.6)
Daily mean °C (°F)	25.8 (78.4)	26.7 (80.1)	26.7 (80.1)	26.4 (79.5)	25.9 (78.6)	24.9 (76.8)	23.8 (74.8)	23.7 (74.7)	24.3 (75.7)	25.0 (77.0)	25.9 (78.6)	25.7 (78.3)	25.4 (77.7)
Mean daily minimum °C (°F)	21.4 (70.5)	22.1 (71.8)	22.6 (72.7)	22.6 (72.7)	22.6 (72.7)	21.9 (71.4)	21.6 (70.9)	21.2 (70.2)	21.8 (71.2)	21.8 (71.2)	22.1 (71.8)	21.2 (70.2)	21.9 (71.4)
Record low °C (°F)	12.8 (55.0)	13.3 (55.9)	18.3 (64.9)	19.4 (66.9)	19.4 (66.9)	18.3 (64.9)	16.7 (62.1)	16.1 (61.0)	18.9 (66.0)	18.9 (66.0)	15.6 (60.1)	14.4 (57.9)	12.8 (55.0)
Average rainfall mm (inches)	18 (0.7)	33 (1.3)	97 (3.8)	168 (6.6)	213 (8.4)	302 (11.9)	320 (12.6)	211 (8.3)	318 (12.5)	241 (9.5)	76 (3.0)	15 (0.6)	2,012 (79.2)
Average rainy days (≥ 0.3 mm)	2	4	9	12	16	20	23	19	25	21	7	2	160
Average relative humidity (%)	84	81	84	85	87	90	93	92	91	89	86	84	87
Mean monthly sunshine hours	179.8	178.0	173.6	177.0	176.7	144.0	99.2	89.9	81.0	148.8	192.0	213.9	1,853.9
Mean daily sunshine hours	5.8	6.3	5.6	5.9	5.7	4.8	3.2	2.9	2.7	4.8	6.4	6.9	5.1
Source: Deutscher Wetterdienst

Climate data for Kano (1981-2010)
Month	Jan	Feb	Mar	Apr	May	Jun	Jul	Aug	Sep	Oct	Nov	Dec	Year
Mean daily maximum °C (°F)	29.0 (84.2)	32.4 (90.3)	36.4 (97.5)	39.1 (102.4)	37.1 (98.8)	35.4 (95.7)	32.0 (89.6)	30.9 (87.6)	32.3 (90.1)	34.5 (94.1)	33.1 (91.6)	29.9 (85.8)	33.5 (92.3)
Mean daily minimum °C (°F)	13.7 (56.7)	16.2 (61.2)	20.4 (68.7)	24.5 (76.1)	25.0 (77.0)	23.7 (74.7)	22.1 (71.8)	21.2 (70.2)	21.9 (71.4)	21.2 (70.2)	17.1 (62.8)	14.2 (57.6)	20.1 (68.2)
Average rainfall mm (inches)	0.0 (0.0)	0.7 (0.03)	1.9 (0.07)	8.1 (0.32)	71.3 (2.81)	118.7 (4.67)	209.0 (8.23)	311.2 (12.25)	137.0 (5.39)	14.1 (0.56)	1.0 (0.04)	0.0 (0.0)	873 (34.37)
Average rainy days	0	0	1	2	8	11	17	21	14	2	1	0	72
Average relative humidity (%) (at 15:00 LST)	17.0	13.2	13.2	19.1	29.5	44.5	58.9	63.6	55.0	30.1	18.1	17.4	31.6
Mean monthly sunshine hours	244.9	232.4	238.7	234.0	263.5	261.0	229.4	220.1	240.0	266.6	264.0	260.4	2,955
Mean daily sunshine hours	7.9	8.3	7.7	7.8	8.5	8.7	7.4	7.1	8.0	8.6	8.8	8.4	8.1
Source 1: World Meteorological Organization & Danish Meteorological Institute (rainfall & rain days)
Source 2: NOAA (sun and relative humidity, 1961–1990)

Climate data for Maiduguri (1961-1990 normals)
Month	Jan	Feb	Mar	Apr	May	Jun	Jul	Aug	Sep	Oct	Nov	Dec	Year
Record high °C (°F)	40 (104)	42 (108)	44 (111)	46 (115)	47 (117)	42 (108)	43 (109)	36 (97)	38 (100)	39 (102)	39 (102)	38 (100)	47 (117)
Mean daily maximum °C (°F)	31.9 (89.4)	34.6 (94.3)	37.8 (100.0)	40.1 (104.2)	39.4 (102.9)	36.4 (97.5)	33.2 (91.8)	32.0 (89.6)	33.7 (92.7)	36.4 (97.5)	34.2 (93.6)	32.3 (90.1)	35.2 (95.4)
Daily mean °C (°F)	21.8 (71.2)	24.8 (76.6)	29.3 (84.7)	32.6 (90.7)	32.5 (90.5)	30.2 (86.4)	27.5 (81.5)	26.6 (79.9)	27.2 (81.0)	27.9 (82.2)	24.9 (76.8)	23.2 (73.8)	27.4 (81.3)
Mean daily minimum °C (°F)	12.6 (54.7)	15.3 (59.5)	19.7 (67.5)	21.9 (71.4)	25.5 (77.9)	24.5 (76.1)	22.9 (73.2)	22.3 (72.1)	22.4 (72.3)	20.7 (69.3)	16.0 (60.8)	13.1 (55.6)	19.9 (67.8)
Record low °C (°F)	8 (46)	10 (50)	15 (59)	12 (54)	18 (64)	19 (66)	20 (68)	19 (66)	20 (68)	15 (59)	10 (50)	5 (41)	5 (41)
Average precipitation mm (inches)	0.0 (0.0)	0.0 (0.0)	0.3 (0.01)	13.0 (0.51)	30.5 (1.20)	73.8 (2.91)	147.1 (5.79)	193.2 (7.61)	83.0 (3.27)	11.1 (0.44)	0.0 (0.0)	0.1 (0.00)	552.1 (21.74)
Average precipitation days (≥ 1.0 mm)	0.0	0.0	0.5	1.6	4.0	7.0	10.7	10.7	6.8	1.4	0.0	0.0	42.7
Average relative humidity (%) (at 15:00 LST)	15.4	11.2	12.0	17.5	28.4	38.4	55.5	63.4	54.8	30.2	19.0	19.6	30.2
Mean monthly sunshine hours	266.6	249.2	257.3	237.0	263.5	249.0	217.0	204.6	225.0	285.2	282.0	275.9	3,012.3
Mean daily sunshine hours	8.6	8.9	8.3	7.9	8.5	8.3	7.0	6.6	7.5	9.2	9.4	8.9	8.3
Source 1: NOAA, Climate Charts (latitude: 11°51'N; longitude: 013°05'E; elevation: 354m, 1161')
Source 2: Voodoo Skies for record temperatures

Climate data for Ibadan
Month	Jan	Feb	Mar	Apr	May	Jun	Jul	Aug	Sep	Oct	Nov	Dec	Year
Record high °C (°F)	37.2 (99.0)	38.9 (102.0)	38.3 (100.9)	37.2 (99.0)	35.0 (95.0)	33.3 (91.9)	31.7 (89.1)	31.7 (89.1)	35.6 (96.1)	33.3 (91.9)	33.9 (93.0)	35.6 (96.1)	38.9 (102.0)
Mean daily maximum °C (°F)	32.3 (90.1)	34.0 (93.2)	33.5 (92.3)	32.3 (90.1)	31.2 (88.2)	29.6 (85.3)	27.8 (82.0)	27.2 (81.0)	28.5 (83.3)	29.7 (85.5)	31.3 (88.3)	31.9 (89.4)	30.8 (87.4)
Daily mean °C (°F)	25.7 (78.3)	26.9 (80.4)	26.9 (80.4)	26.3 (79.3)	25.6 (78.1)	25.1 (77.2)	23.6 (74.5)	23.1 (73.6)	23.9 (75.0)	24.3 (75.7)	25.6 (78.1)	25.5 (77.9)	25.2 (77.4)
Mean daily minimum °C (°F)	20.9 (69.6)	21.9 (71.4)	22.5 (72.5)	22.0 (71.6)	21.7 (71.1)	21.6 (70.9)	21.2 (70.2)	20.7 (69.3)	21.8 (71.2)	21.7 (71.1)	21.6 (70.9)	20.7 (69.3)	21.5 (70.7)
Record low °C (°F)	10.0 (50.0)	11.1 (52.0)	15.0 (59.0)	18.3 (64.9)	17.8 (64.0)	17.8 (64.0)	16.1 (61.0)	15.6 (60.1)	17.2 (63.0)	17.8 (64.0)	15.6 (60.1)	11.1 (52.0)	10.0 (50.0)
Average rainfall mm (inches)	10 (0.4)	25 (1.0)	91 (3.6)	135 (5.3)	152 (6.0)	188 (7.4)	155 (6.1)	86 (3.4)	175 (6.9)	160 (6.3)	46 (1.8)	10 (0.4)	1,233 (48.5)
Average rainy days (≥ 0.3 mm)	1	3	7	9	14	17	15	13	18	18	7	1	123
Average relative humidity (%)	76	73	77	82	85	87	89	88	88	87	83	79	83
Mean monthly sunshine hours	198.4	197.8	186.0	180.0	195.3	147.0	86.8	65.1	93.0	164.3	207.0	220.1	1,940.8
Mean daily sunshine hours	6.4	7.0	6.0	6.0	6.3	4.9	2.8	2.1	3.1	5.3	6.9	7.1	5.3
Source: Deutscher Wetterdienst

Climate data for Jos (1961–1990 normals)
Month	Jan	Feb	Mar	Apr	May	Jun	Jul	Aug	Sep	Oct	Nov	Dec	Year
Mean daily maximum °C (°F)	27.3 (81.1)	28.7 (83.7)	30.4 (86.7)	30.2 (86.4)	28.2 (82.8)	26.6 (79.9)	24.4 (75.9)	24.3 (75.7)	26.1 (79.0)	27.8 (82.0)	28.0 (82.4)	27.2 (81.0)	27.4 (81.3)
Daily mean °C (°F)	21.3 (70.3)	22.9 (73.2)	24.9 (76.8)	25.7 (78.3)	24.5 (76.1)	22.7 (72.9)	21.4 (70.5)	20.9 (69.6)	21.9 (71.4)	22.9 (73.2)	22.7 (72.9)	21.5 (70.7)	22.8 (73.0)
Mean daily minimum °C (°F)	12.7 (54.9)	15.1 (59.2)	17.7 (63.9)	18.3 (64.9)	18.0 (64.4)	17.2 (63.0)	16.7 (62.1)	16.5 (61.7)	16.7 (62.1)	16.3 (61.3)	14.4 (57.9)	13.1 (55.6)	16.1 (61.0)
Average precipitation mm (inches)	0.4 (0.02)	2.8 (0.11)	29.8 (1.17)	92.9 (3.66)	159.8 (6.29)	198.5 (7.81)	303.8 (11.96)	290.1 (11.42)	197.6 (7.78)	38.3 (1.51)	0.3 (0.01)	0.5 (0.02)	1,314.8 (51.76)
Average precipitation days (≥ 0.1 mm)	0.1	0.2	1.4	6.9	11.6	15.6	20.6	19.9	16.2	4.0	0.1	0.1	96.7
Average relative humidity (%)	14.1	13.6	19.6	38.7	58.3	66.0	75.8	76.2	64.2	42.0	20.8	16.5	42.1
Mean monthly sunshine hours	282.1	254.8	238.7	204.0	204.6	198.0	158.1	139.5	177.0	238.7	285.0	288.3	2,668.8
Mean daily sunshine hours	9.1	9.1	7.7	6.8	6.6	6.6	5.1	4.5	5.9	7.7	9.5	9.3	7.3
Source 1: NOAA
Source 2: Climate-Data.orgJos (altitude: 1185m, mean temperatures)

Climate data for Sokoto (1981–2010)
Month	Jan	Feb	Mar	Apr	May	Jun	Jul	Aug	Sep	Oct	Nov	Dec	Year
Mean daily maximum °C (°F)	32.1 (89.8)	34.8 (94.6)	38.6 (101.5)	40.6 (105.1)	39.0 (102.2)	36.2 (97.2)	32.8 (91.0)	31.3 (88.3)	32.8 (91.0)	36.0 (96.8)	36.1 (97.0)	32.9 (91.2)	35.3 (95.5)
Daily mean °C (°F)	24.5 (76.1)	27.1 (80.8)	31.2 (88.2)	33.7 (92.7)	33.1 (91.6)	30.9 (87.6)	28.2 (82.8)	27.2 (81.0)	28.0 (82.4)	29.7 (85.5)	28.3 (82.9)	25.3 (77.5)	28.9 (84.1)
Mean daily minimum °C (°F)	16.9 (62.4)	19.4 (66.9)	23.8 (74.8)	26.9 (80.4)	27.3 (81.1)	25.6 (78.1)	23.6 (74.5)	23.1 (73.6)	23.2 (73.8)	23.4 (74.1)	20.5 (68.9)	17.7 (63.9)	22.6 (72.7)
Average rainfall mm (inches)	0.0 (0.0)	0.1 (0.00)	1.5 (0.06)	4.8 (0.19)	46.5 (1.83)	80.0 (3.15)	186.6 (7.35)	200.5 (7.89)	109.8 (4.32)	17.2 (0.68)	0.0 (0.0)	0.0 (0.0)	647 (25.47)
Average rainy days (≥ 0.2 mm)	0	0	0	1	4	7	11	14	8	2	0	0	47
Average relative humidity (%)	24	19	21	34	50	62	76	83	80	64	36	27	48
Mean monthly sunshine hours	288.3	268.4	275.9	255.0	272.8	279.0	229.4	186.0	237.0	303.8	300.0	300.7	3,196.3
Mean daily sunshine hours	9.3	9.5	8.9	8.5	8.8	9.3	7.4	6.0	7.9	9.8	10.0	9.7	8.8
Source 1: World Meteorological Organization
Source 2: Deutscher Wetterdienst (humidity, 1951–1965 and sun, 1952–1961)

Climate data for Okada Town, Nigeria
Month	Jan	Feb	Mar	Apr	May	Jun	Jul	Aug	Sep	Oct	Nov	Dec	Year
Mean daily maximum °C (°F)	34.3 (93.7)	34 (93)	32.8 (91.0)	31.2 (88.2)	30.1 (86.2)	28.7 (83.7)	28.1 (82.6)	28 (82)	28.5 (83.3)	29.5 (85.1)	30.8 (87.4)	33 (91)	30.7 (87.3)
Daily mean °C (°F)	27.5 (81.5)	27.8 (82.0)	27.4 (81.3)	26.6 (79.9)	25.9 (78.6)	24.9 (76.8)	24.3 (75.7)	24.3 (75.7)	24.5 (76.1)	25.1 (77.2)	26 (79)	26.9 (80.4)	25.9 (78.7)
Mean daily minimum °C (°F)	22.6 (72.7)	24 (75)	24.6 (76.3)	24.2 (75.6)	23.6 (74.5)	22.9 (73.2)	22.4 (72.3)	22.2 (72.0)	22.4 (72.3)	22.7 (72.9)	23.2 (73.8)	22.7 (72.9)	23.1 (73.6)
Average precipitation mm (inches)	24 (0.9)	42 (1.7)	95 (3.7)	159 (6.3)	210 (8.3)	244 (9.6)	247 (9.7)	233 (9.2)	252 (9.9)	194 (7.6)	63 (2.5)	20 (0.8)	1,783 (70.2)
Average rainy days	5	8	16	18	20	20	21	20	20	19	11	5	183
Average relative humidity (%)	61	71	80	86	88	90	89	87	89	89	85	71	82
Mean monthly sunshine hours	7.8	7.0	6.2	5.7	5.3	4.5	4.2	3.9	4.3	4.8	5.4	7.4	66.5
Source: Climate-Data.org

Climate data for Vandeikya (1980–2024)
Month	Jan	Feb	Mar	Apr	May	Jun	Jul	Aug	Sep	Oct	Nov	Dec	Year
Mean daily maximum °C (°F)	30.0 (86.0)	31.7 (89.1)	31.7 (89.1)	30.6 (87.1)	29.4 (84.9)	28.3 (82.9)	27.8 (82.0)	27.2 (81.0)	27.8 (82.0)	28.3 (82.9)	29.4 (84.9)	29.4 (84.9)	31.7 (89.1)
Daily mean °C (°F)	23.9 (75.0)	25.6 (78.1)	26.7 (80.1)	26.7 (80.1)	26.1 (79.0)	25.0 (77.0)	24.4 (75.9)	24.4 (75.9)	24.4 (75.9)	25.0 (77.0)	25.0 (77.0)	23.9 (75.0)	25.1 (77.2)
Mean daily minimum °C (°F)	18.9 (66.0)	20.6 (69.1)	22.8 (73.0)	23.3 (73.9)	23.3 (73.9)	22.8 (73.0)	22.2 (72.0)	21.7 (71.1)	22.2 (72.0)	22.2 (72.0)	21.1 (70.0)	18.9 (66.0)	21.7 (71.1)
Average precipitation mm (inches)	2.54 (0.10)	12.70 (0.50)	55.88 (2.20)	119.38 (4.70)	175.26 (6.90)	208.28 (8.20)	215.90 (8.50)	228.60 (9.00)	254.00 (10.00)	210.82 (8.30)	48.26 (1.90)	2.54 (0.10)	1,534.16 (60.40)
Average precipitation days (≥ 1.0 mm)	0.6	2.5	10.9	18.2	22.7	22.9	23.0	24.2	25.4	23.2	7.0	0.6	181.0
Average relative humidity (%) (at 15:00 LST)	36.3	55.8	85.0	96.3	99.5	99.6	99.9	99.3	99.6	99.3	69.1	36.9	81.4
Source: Weatherspark

Climate data for Afikpo
Month	Jan	Feb	Mar	Apr	May	Jun	Jul	Aug	Sep	Oct	Nov	Dec	Year
Mean daily maximum °C (°F)	32.6 (90.7)	33.8 (92.8)	33.8 (92.8)	33.4 (92.1)	32 (90)	30.8 (87.4)	29.3 (84.7)	28.6 (83.5)	29.9 (85.8)	30.8 (87.4)	32.1 (89.8)	32.6 (90.7)	31.6 (89.0)
Daily mean °C (°F)	27.5 (81.5)	28.5 (83.3)	29 (84)	28.7 (83.7)	27.6 (81.7)	26.7 (80.1)	25.4 (77.7)	25.6 (78.1)	26 (79)	26.6 (79.9)	27.4 (81.3)	27.4 (81.3)	27.2 (81.0)
Mean daily minimum °C (°F)	22.5 (72.5)	23.2 (73.8)	24.2 (75.6)	24 (75)	23.3 (73.9)	22.6 (72.7)	22.2 (72.0)	22.7 (72.9)	22.2 (72.0)	22.4 (72.3)	22.8 (73.0)	22.3 (72.1)	22.9 (73.1)
Average precipitation mm (inches)	19 (0.7)	34 (1.3)	84 (3.3)	159 (6.3)	247 (9.7)	261 (10.3)	303 (11.9)	270 (10.6)	309 (12.2)	269 (10.6)	57 (2.2)	10 (0.4)	2,022 (79.5)
Source: Climate-Data.org (altitude: 62m)

== Topography ==
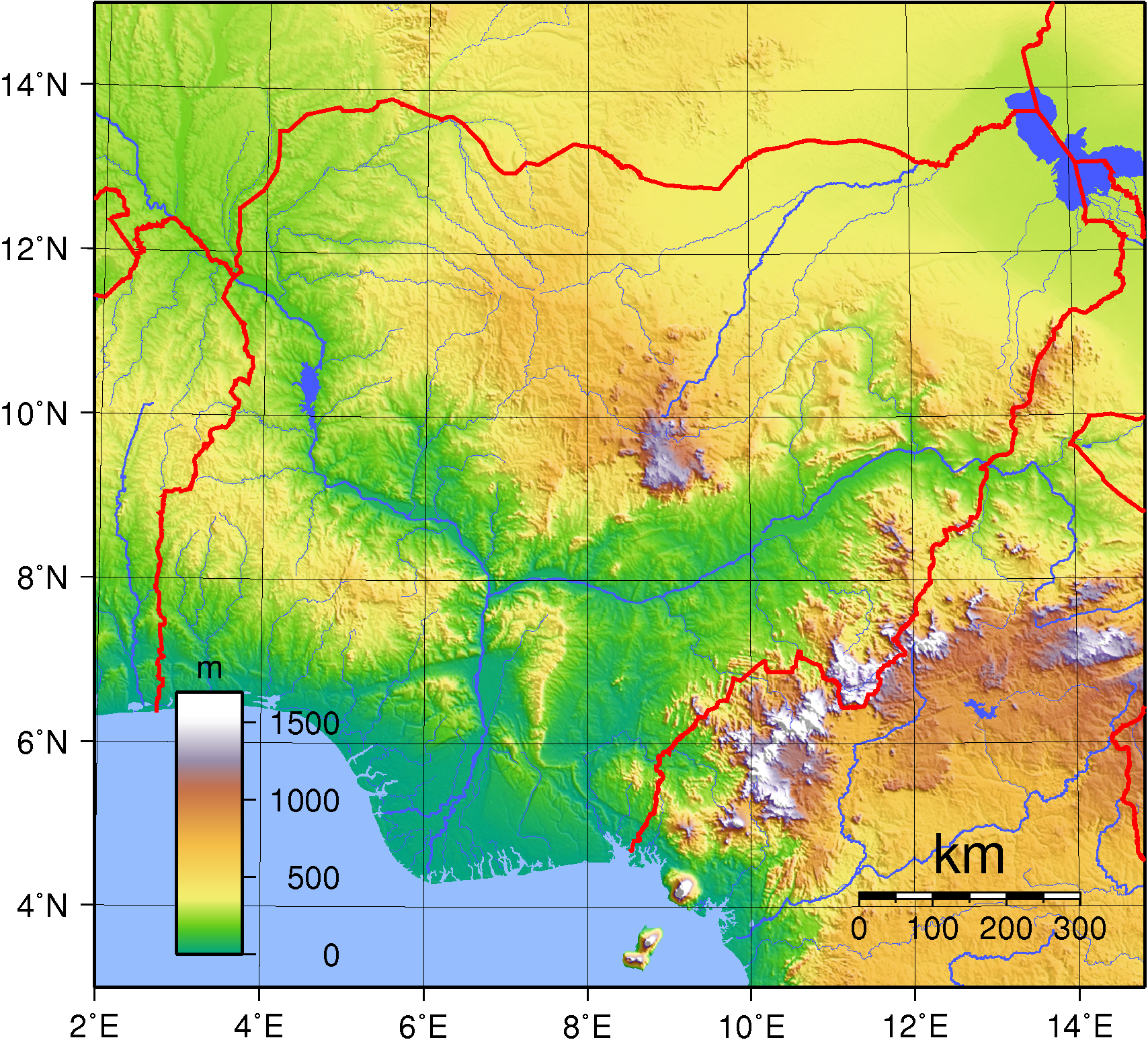
Topography of Nigeria

Nigeria's most expansive topographical region is that of the Niger and Benue River valleys, which merge into each other and form a "y" shaped confluence at Lokoja. Plains rise to the north of the valleys. To the southwest of the Niger there is "rugged" highland, and to the southeast of the Benue hills and mountains are found all the way to the border with Cameroon. Coastal plains are found in both the southwest and the southeast.

=== Niger Delta ===
The Niger Delta is located in the southern part of Nigeria. It is one of the world's largest arcuate fan-shaped river deltas. The riverine area of the Niger Delta is a coastal belt of swamps bordering the Atlantic. The mangrove swamps are vegetated tidal flats formed by a reticulate pattern of interconnected meandering creeks and tributaries of the Niger River. About 70% of Nigeria's crude oil and gas production is from the area. A recent global remote sensing analysis suggested that there were 1,244 km^{2} (480 sq mi) of tidal flats in Nigeria, making it the 27th ranked country in terms of tidal flat area.

== Vegetation ==
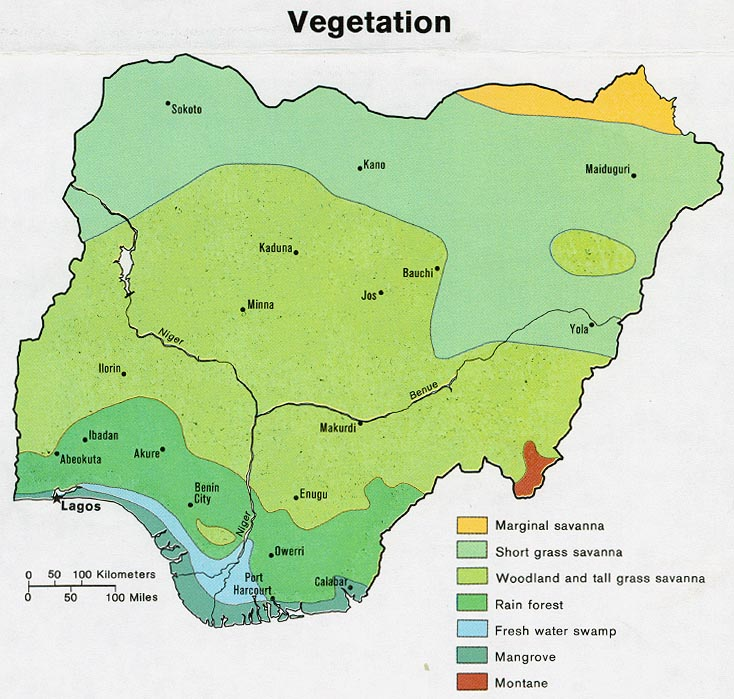
Vegetation map of Nigeria.

Nigeria is covered by three types of vegetation: forests (where there is significant tree cover), savannahs (insignificant tree cover, with grasses and flowers located between trees), and montane land (least common and mainly found in the mountains near the Cameroon border). Both the forest zone and the savannah zone are divided into three parts.

Some of the forest zone's most southerly portion, especially around the Niger River and Cross River deltas, is mangrove swamp. North of this is fresh water swamp, containing different vegetation from the salt water mangrove swamps, and north of that is rain forest.

The savannah zone's three categories are divided into Guinean forest-savanna mosaic, made up of plains of tall grass which are interrupted by trees, the most common across the country; Sudan savannah, with short grasses and short trees; and Sahel savannah patches of grass and sand, found in the northeast.

=== Plant ecology ===
Nigeria has numerous tree species, of which the majority of them are native while few are exotic. A high percentage of man-made forests in the country is dominated by exotic species. This culminated from the assumption that exotic trees are fast-growing. However, studies have also investigated the growth of indigenous trees in with that of exotic species. Due to overexploitation, the remaining natural ecosystems and primary forests in Nigeria are restricted to the protected areas which include one biosphere reserve, seven national parks, one World Heritage site, 12 Strict Nature Reserves (SNRs), 32 game reserves/wildlife sanctuaries, and hundreds of forest reserves. These are in addition to several ex-situ conservation sites such as arboreta, botanical gardens, zoological gardens, and gene banks managed by several tertiary and research institutions

Many countries in Africa are affected by Invasive Alien Species (IAS). In 2004, the IUCN–World Conservation Union identified 81 IAS in South Africa, 49 in Mauritius, 37 in Algeria and Madagascar, 35 in Kenya, 28 in Egypt, 26 in Ghana and Zimbabwe, and 22 in Ethiopia. However, very little is known about IAS in Nigeria, with most technical reports and literature reporting fewer than 10 invasive plants in the country. Aside from plant invaders, Rattus rattus and Avian influenza virus were also considered IAS in Nigeria. The initial entry of IAS into Nigeria was mainly through exotic plant introductions by the colonial rulers either for forest tree plantations or for ornamental purposes. The entry of exotic plants into Nigeria during the post-independence era was encouraged by increasing economic activity, the commencement of commercial oil explorations, the introduction through ships, and the introduction of ornamental plants by commercial floriculturists.

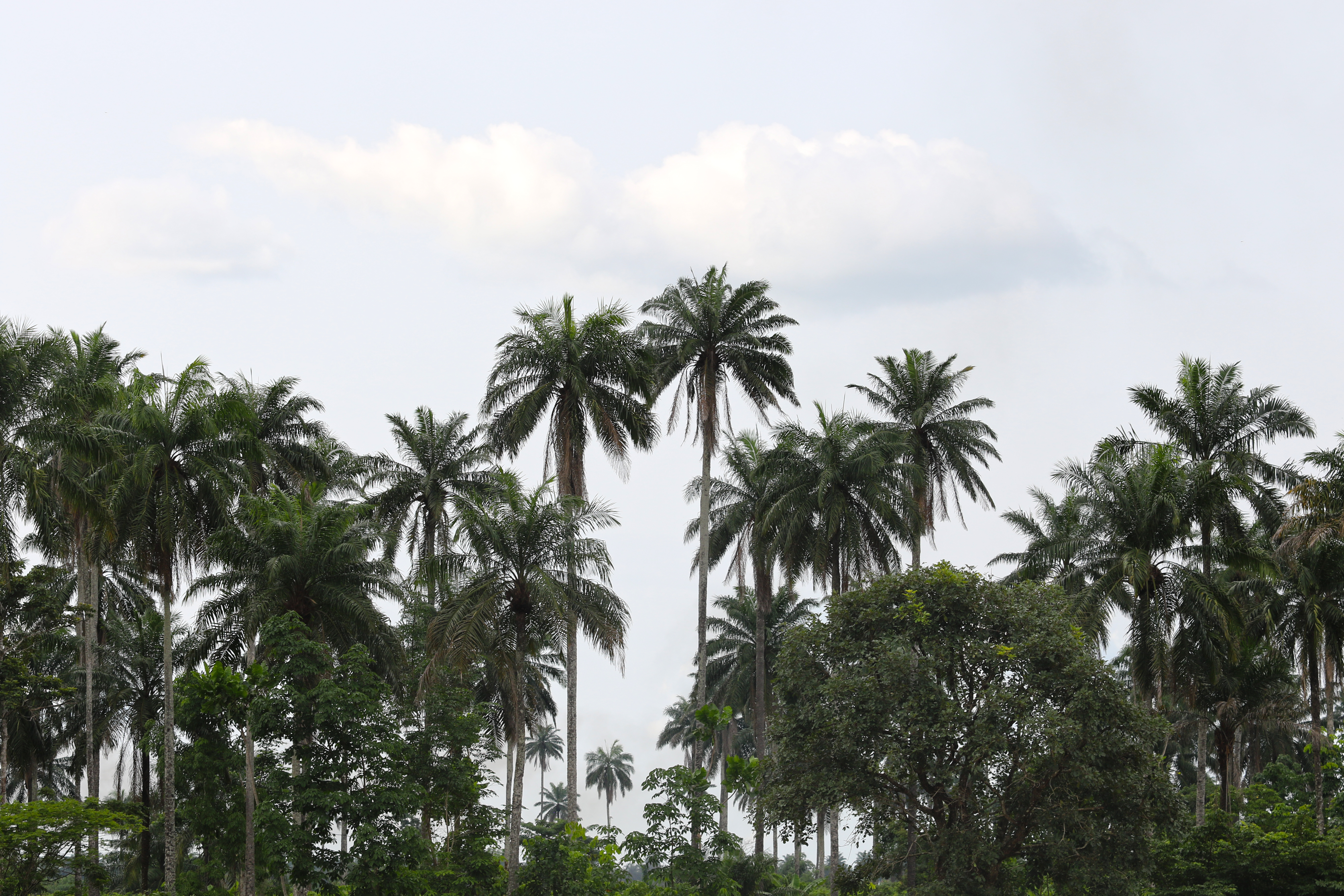
Palm plantation in Delta State

In the semi-arid and dry sub-humid savannas of West Africa, including Nigeria, numerous species of herbaceous dicots especially from the genera Crotalaria, Alysicarpus, Cassia and Ipomea are known to be widely used in livestock production. Quite often they are plucked or cut and fed either as fresh or conserved fodders. The utilization of these and many other herbs growing naturally within the farm environment is opportunistic.

Many other species native to Nigeria, including soybean and its varieties, serve as an important source of oil and protein in this region. There are also many plants with medicinal purposes that are used to aid the therapy in many organs. Some of these vegetations include Euphorbiaceae, which serve the purpose of aiding malaria, gastrointestinal disorders respectively and many other infections. Different stress factors such as droughts, low soil nutrients and susceptibility to pests have contributed to Maize plantations being an integral part of agriculture in this region.

As industrialization has increased, it has also put species of trees in the forest at risk of air pollution and studies have shown that in certain parts of Nigeria, trees have shown tolerance and grow in areas that have a significant amount of air pollution

== Natural resources and land use ==
Nigeria's natural resources include but are not limited to petroleum, tin, columbite, iron ore, coal, limestone, lead, zinc, natural gas, hydropower, and arable land.

== Extreme points ==
This is a list of the extreme points of Nigeria, the points that are farther north, south, east or west than any other location.

- Northernmost point – unnamed location on the border with Niger immediately northwest of the town of Chadawa, Sokoto State.
- Easternmost point – unnamed location on the border with Cameroon immediately east of the village of Munyego, Borno State.
- Southernmost point – unnamed headland south of the town of Egeregere, Bayelsa State.
- Westernmost point – unnamed location on the border with Benin Republic immediately east of the Beninoise town of Jabata, Oyo State.

== See also ==
- ISO 3166-2:NG
- Climate change in Nigeria
- Administrative divisions of Nigeria
- Heat wave in Nigeria
- Climate of Nigeria
