= Heatwaves in Nigeria =

Weather phenomenon

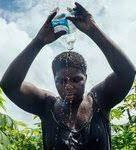
A woman pouring water on her head to reduce high body temperature

Heatwaves in Nigeria are often due to excessively high temperatures, often accompanied by dry conditions and increased humidity. These extreme weather events have become more frequent in recent years, exacerbated by climate change and environmental degradation. Nigeria, being a tropical country, experiences varying temperature fluctuations, but heat waves pose severe challenges, particularly in urban centres where concrete structures and limited vegetation amplify heat retention. The frequency and intensity of heat waves have increased, leading to significant impacts on public health, agriculture, and economic activities.

== Causes ==
Climate change in Nigeria is a primary driver of heat waves, as rising global temperatures have intensified the frequency and duration of extreme heat events. The increasing concentration of greenhouse gases in the atmosphere has led to elevated surface temperatures, causing prolonged heat waves across the country. Nigeria, being situated in a tropical climate zone, is particularly vulnerable to these changes, with states in the northern region experiencing the most extreme conditions. The shifting climate patterns have also disrupted traditional weather cycles, making heat waves more unpredictable and severe.

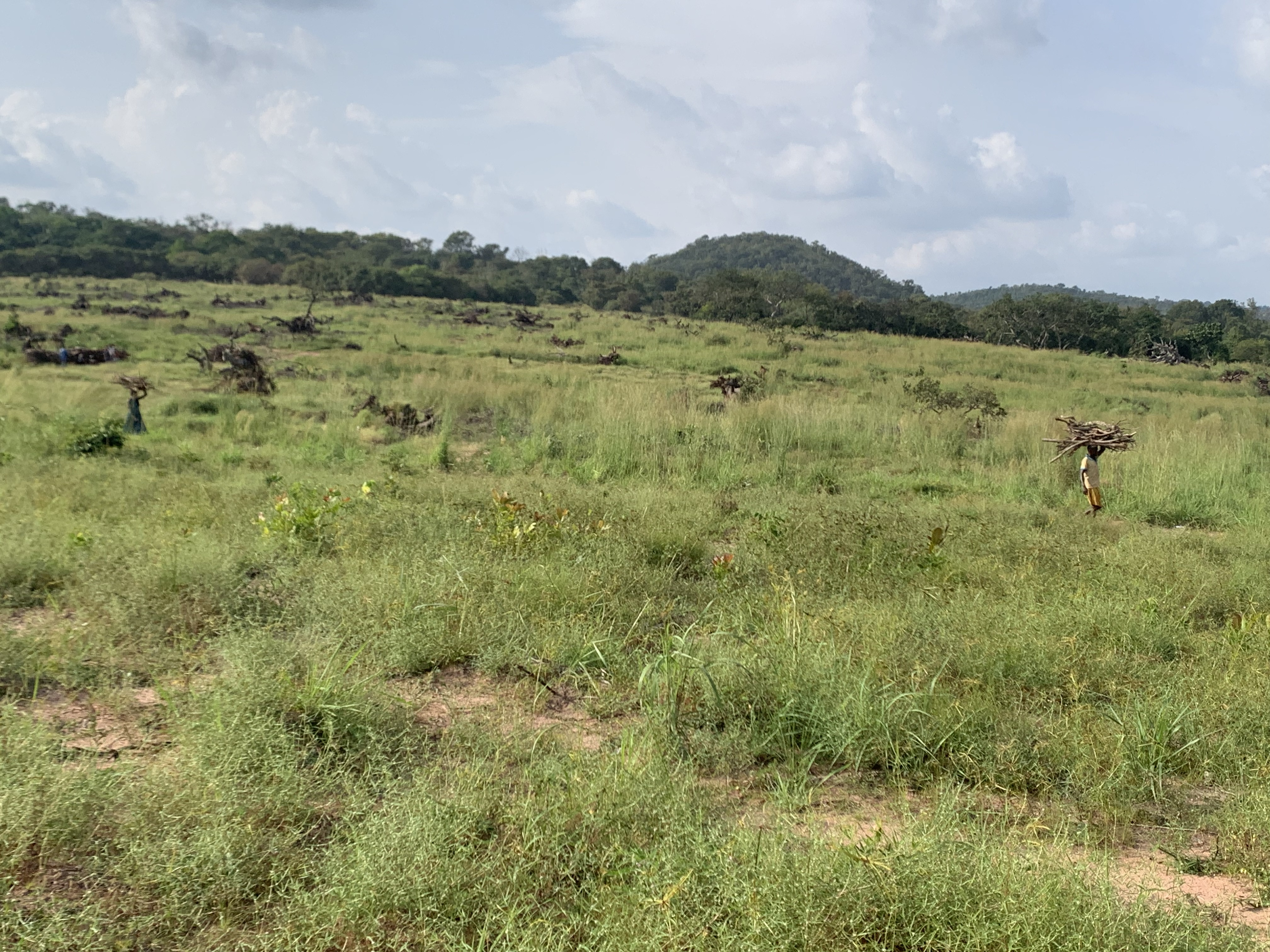
Deforestation in Nigeria

- Deforestation has significantly contributed to heat waves in Nigeria, as widespread tree felling for agriculture, urban expansion, and fuel wood reduces the natural cooling effect of forests. Vegetation plays a crucial role in regulating temperatures by providing shade and releasing moisture into the atmosphere. However, as more land is cleared for development, urban areas experience an intensified heat island effect, where temperatures are notably higher than in surrounding rural areas. This phenomenon is especially pronounced in major cities such as Lagos, Abuja, and Kano, where green spaces are diminishing rapidly.
- Agricultural practices, such as large scale irrigation and the overuse of chemical fertilizers, contribute to rising temperatures in some regions of Nigeria. Excessive irrigation can lead to increased humidity, creating conditions that amplify heat waves, while chemical fertilizers release greenhouse gases that contribute to global warming. Poor land management practices, including overgrazing and soil degradation, further exacerbate these effects, making rural communities more susceptible to extreme heat events.
- Air pollution, particularly from vehicle emissions, industrial activities, and open burning of waste, has worsened heat waves in Nigeria. Pollutants such as black carbon and ozone trap heat in the atmosphere, leading to increased surface temperatures. Cities with high levels of air pollution experience more intense heat waves, as smog and greenhouse gases prevent heat from escaping, creating a warming effect known as localized climate change.

== Impact ==
Heat waves in Nigeria have profound health implications, particularly for vulnerable populations such as children, the elderly, and individuals with pre existing medical conditions. Prolonged exposure to extreme heat increases the risk of dehydration, heat exhaustion, and heatstroke, which can be fatal if not promptly treated. Healthcare facilities often experience a surge in heat-related illnesses during periods of extreme temperatures, straining medical resources and infrastructure. Also, high temperatures intensify respiratory conditions such as asthma and other chronic illnesses due to increased air pollution and deteriorating air quality, particularly in urban areas with heavy industrial activity and vehicular emissions.

== Notable heat waves ==
In March 2019, Nigeria experienced one of its most intense heat waves, with temperatures exceeding 45°C (113°F) in some northern states. The extreme heat led to increased hospital admissions and power shortages. Many communities in Sokoto, Kano, and Maiduguri reported water shortages, and cases of heat related illnesses surged, particularly among children and the elderly.

The 2020 heat wave saw record breaking temperatures, particularly in states such as Katsina, Bauchi, and Yobe. The extreme heat triggered a rise in cases of heat exhaustion and heatstroke, leading to public health warnings. The power grid was heavily strained as electricity demand for cooling soared, resulting in frequent blackouts across major cities.

The 2023 heat wave was particularly severe, with cities like Abuja, Lagos, and Kano recording temperatures above 42°C (108°F). Reports indicated a rise in heat-related illnesses and economic slowdowns in affected regions. Several schools and businesses had to adjust their operating hours to minimize exposure to extreme heat. Additionally, an increase in wildfires was recorded in some agricultural zones, further exacerbating the challenges posed by the prolonged heat.

== See also ==
- Geography of Nigeria
- Sustainable Development Goals and Nigeria
- Climate of Nigeria
