= Nigeria's Climate Change Act, 2021 =

Nigeria's Climate Change Act, 2021 is an Act of the National Assembly of Nigeria. The act requires the government to establish a National Climate Change Action Plan and a five-year carbon budget, with specific annual targets. The act establishes the National Council on Climate Change. This Council is tasked with executing the National Climate Change Action Plan and has control over the newly established Climate Change Fund.

== Background ==
In November 2021, President Buhari authorized the Nigeria's Climate Change Act, 2021 to become law. This enactment establishes a legal structure for Nigeria, facilitating the pursuit of its climate objectives, long-term social and economic stability, as well as resilience. Building upon the President's commitment expressed at COP 26 in Glasgow to reach net zero by 2060, the Act sets forth a comprehensive goal of attaining net zero emissions spanning from 2050 to 2070.

The Act includes significant provisions that outline the following key aspects:

- The government is required to establish a National Climate Change Action Plan and a five-year carbon budget, complete with quantified annual objectives. Both these measures are subject to validation by the Federal Executive Council. The initial carbon budget is set to receive approval by November 2022.
- The formation of the National Council on Climate Change is stipulated, defining its composition and responsibilities. This Council assumes the role of executing the National Climate Change Action Plan and overseeing the administration of the newly introduced Climate Change Fund. The Fund's funding allocation will be determined through parliamentary deliberations and will facilitate the operations of the Council itself, along with financial support. Collaborating with the environment ministry, the Council will coordinate global climate action and sector-specific initiatives. Additionally, it will focus on identifying and implementing high-priority adaptation measures.
