= Sustainable Development Goals and Nigeria =

Set of 17 global development goals defined by the United Nations for the year 2030

- Mission statement: "A blueprint to achieve a better and more sustainable future for all by 2030"
- Commercial?: No
- Type of project: Non-Profit
- Location: Global
- Owner: Supported by United Nations & owned by the community
- Founder: United Nations
- Established: 2015
- Website: nigeria.un.org

Sustainable Development Goals and Nigeria is about how Nigeria is implementing the Sustainable Development Goals within the thirty-six states and its Federal Capital Territory (FCT). The Sustainable Development Goals (SDGs) consist of seventeen global goals designed as a "blueprint to achieve a better and more sustainable future for all". Each of the 17 goals is expected to be achieved by 2030 in every country around the world.

Nigeria is one of the countries that presented its Voluntary National Review (VNR) in 2017 and 2020 on the implementation of the SDGs at the High-Level Political Forum on Sustainable Development (HLPF). In 2020, Nigeria ranked 160 on the 2020 world's SDG Index. The government affirmed that Nigeria's current development priorities and objectives are focused on achieving the SDGs.

The Lagos SDGs Youth Alliance is another pivotal SDGs Initiative in Nigeria aimed at promoting the involvement of youth in achieving the 2030 Agenda and supporting long-term sustainable development strategy of Lagos state.

== Background ==
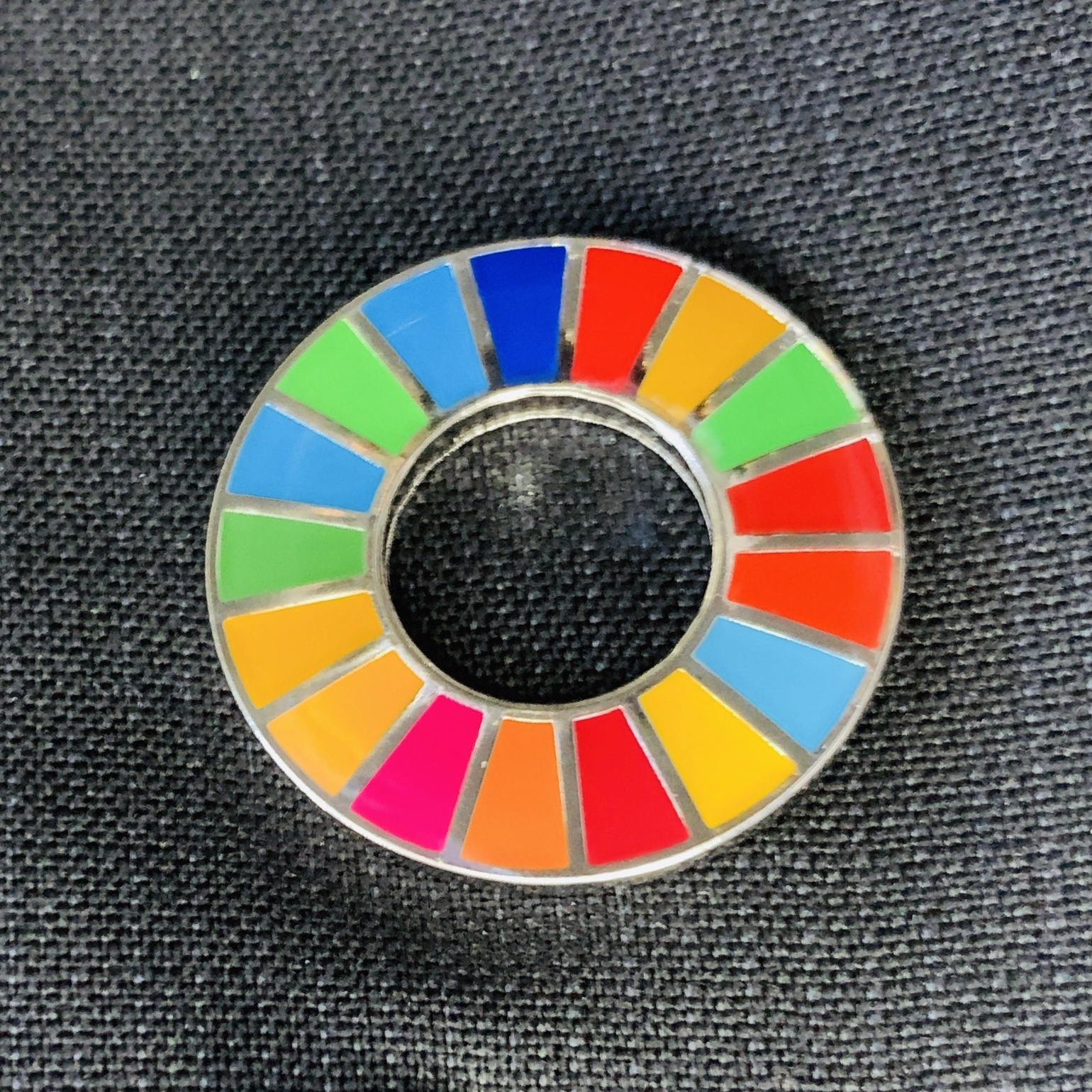
SDGS in Nigeria

Nigeria became a member of the United Nations (UN) on 7 October 1960. Nigeria is the most populous nation in Africa and has the seventh-highest population in the world. Nigeria gained independence on 1 October 1960. In 2012, Nigeria contributed the fifth largest number of peacekeepers to United Nations peacekeeping operations.

The SDGs or Project 2030 is a global call to put an end to poverty, secure the planet and ensure that everyone enjoys peace and prosperity by 2030. It was adopted by 193 countries with Nigeria as one of its country members. The SDGs are a set of seventeen interconnected goals which have targets with at least one or two indicators for each target. The implementation of "Global Goals" for all kicked off in January 2015. Its objectives are to ensure social inclusion, protect the environment and foster economic growth. Governments, private sector, research, academia and civil society organizations (CSOs) receive support from the UN as the SDGs encourage partnerships. It ensures the right choices are adopted now to improve life for future generations in a sustainable way. The SDGs are blueprints for the world to experience peace and prosperity at the fullest by 2030.

According to an agreement between the Nigerian government and the United Nations, it aims to align its development priorities in partnership with CSOs and the private sector to achieve the SDGs together. Agenda 2030 is designed to build a sustainable world around the five P's, namely; People, Planet, Prosperity, Peace, and Partnerships, which span across the 17 SDGs. In 2017, Nigeria was among 44 member countries of the United Nations to present its Voluntary National Review (VNR) on the implementation of the 2030 Agenda and the SDGs at the High-level Political Forum on Sustainable Development (HLPF). The government, non-governmental organizations, and academic institutions are working towards these goals in Nigeria.

== Progress on selected SDGs ==
=== Goal 3 - Good Health and Well-Being ===
According to the United Nations, at least 400 million people lack access to basic healthcare and 40% have no social protection. The Sustainable Development Goals aim to reduce neglected tropical diseases, AIDS, hepatitis, water-borne diseases and other communicable diseases. The Nigeria Economic Recovery and Growth Plan was launched to align the SDGs with a target of 2030. Among the goals is to reduce the maternal mortality ratio to 70/100,000 live births.

=== Goal 4 - Education ===
In 2016, Nigeria's Universal Basic Education Commission (UBEC) reported that it has the highest number of out-of-school children in the world, an estimated 10.5 million. Hence, the implementation of the State Universal Basic Education Board's provision for free Universal Basic Education for every Nigerian child of school-going age.

=== Goal 5 - Gender Equality ===
In 2000, Nigeria passed into law the National Policy on Women guided by the global instrument of the Convention on the Elimination of All Forms of Discrimination Against Women (CEDAW). In 2015, a National Bureau of Statistics report showed improvement in girls' access to education, with enrollment for females in primary and secondary schools increased from 46.7% and 47.1% in 2010 to 48.3% and 47.9% respectively in 2015.

=== Goal 6 - Clean Water and Sanitation ===
According to UNICEF, poor water supply and sanitation cost the Nigerian economy approximately 1.3% of GDP annually.

=== Goal 7 - Affordable and Clean Energy ===
Nigeria has one of the highest energy access deficits globally, with about 90 million Nigerians (50% of the population) lacking access to grid electricit. Nigeria claims to achieve a 13% contribution of hydroelectricity to the electricity generation mix by 2020; a 1% contribution of wind energy to the nation's electricity generation mix by 2020; and a 3% and 6% contribution of solar energy to the nation's electricity generation mix by 2020 and 2030 respectively.

=== Goal 9 - Industry, Innovation and Infrastructure ===
Technological progress in Nigeria is dependent on access to information, digital platforms and the Internet. A 2013 Small and Medium Enterprises Development Agency of Nigeria (SMEDAN) report showed there are over 70 million Micro Small and Medium-sized Enterprises (MSMEs) contributing 50% of the nation's GDP, but it was noted that less than 5% of these businesses have adequate access to financial credit. The priority areas of assistance to these MSMEs are access to finance, provision of infrastructure, and regular power supply.

== Reporting structures ==
In 2017, Nigeria volunteered to be among the countries to review the progress of the 2030 Agenda. Voluntary National Review (VNR) presentations are annual reviews presented to the UN High-level Political Forum on Sustainable Development (HLPF). Nigeria was among 44 United Nations member states to present a Voluntary National Review on the implementation of the 2030 Agenda and the SDGs at HLPF.

In 2020, Nigeria also volunteered with other 46 countries for VNR. The review focuses on:

- Poverty (SDG 1)
- Health and well-being (SDG 3),
- Education (SDG 4),
- Gender equality (SDG 5)
- Inclusive economy (SDG 8),
- Enabling an environment of peace and security (SDG 16)
- Partnerships (SDG 17)

The focus areas are based on the current development priorities and objectives. "The report was given in spite of the COVID-19 pandemic which is believed to slow down the progress of the 2030 Agenda."

== Performance ==
=== 2020 Voluntary National Review ===
In July 2020, President Muhammadu Buhari presented the Voluntary National Review at the HLPF's second panel session, online for the first time due to the COVID-19 pandemic. He gave the progress of seven of the SDGs which are referred to as core to the country at large.

=== Financing ===
On 1 July 2020, Nigeria officially commenced the process of designing and implementing an Integrated National Financing Framework (INFF) for financing national development priorities and achieving the SDGs. The Integrated National Financing Framework (INFF) is a United Nations initiative to support countries in operationalizing the agreements of the Addis Ababa Action Agenda (AAAA) for financing the SDGs. UNDP has been supporting the government and its people by addressing development challenges, strengthening and building institutions that promote inclusive sustainable development and democratic governance. For example, during the COVID-19 crisis, UNDP partnered with Japan to support Nigeria's health and socio-economic response.

== Challenges ==
The year 2020, which is referred to as "Decade of Action" is said to have slow progress regards the progress of SDGs as reported by President Muhammadu Buhari during Nigeria's 2020 Voluntary National Review (VNR)." The focus of the report was on issues of poverty (SDG-1) and an inclusive economy (SDG-8), health and wellbeing (SDG-3), education (SDG-4), gender equality (SDG-5), the enabling environment of peace and security (SDG-16), and partnerships (SDG-17).

== Society and culture ==
=== Higher education ===
There are various institutions across the country committed to creating SDGs awareness, one of these is the University of Ibadan Centre for Sustainable development (CESDEV). The Centre was established by the University of Ibadan as a demonstration of the university's commitment to sustainable development.

=== Events ===
==== Lagos SDGs Week ====
The Lagos SDSs Week is an annual week-long event commemorated by coalescing cross-sectoral stakeholders to synergise Altruism, Advocacy & Action with a view to identifying solutions, reviewing progress, amplifying awareness, collaborating and reaffirming commitment towards accelerating efforts to achieve the 2030 SDGs. The SDGs week features the following programmes: Mr. Governor's Virtual Meet-And-Greet with Lagos SDGs Enablers, Open Goal Adoption by Prominent Lagosians, Neighbourhood Outreach Campaign, Future of Lagos Hackathon, Lagos Local Government / LCDAs Discourse on SDGs. These programmes are intrinsically linked in their purpose to fast-track efforts towards progress for the delivery of the SDGs in Lagos State.

== Organizations ==
This is a list of organizations accelerating Sustainable Development Goals in Nigeria:

- UNDP in Nigeria
- Nigeria Youth SDGs Network
- International Climate Change Development Initiative
- Australian High Commission Nigeria
- Lagos SDGs Youth Alliance
- Teach SDGs
- Nigeria Climate Innovation Center (NCIC)
- Susbridge Solutions

== See also ==
- Climate change in Nigeria
- Deforestation in Nigeria
