= Rita Idehai =

Nigerian environmental activist and social entrepreneur

Rita Idehai (born in the 1990s) is a Nigerian environmental activist, geoscientist, and social entrepreneur best known as the founder and Chief Executive Officer of Ecobarter, a social enterprise focused on sustainable waste management, circular economy solutions, and community‑based climate action in Nigeria. Her work combines waste‑to‑value innovation, public education on environmental sustainability, and empowerment of marginalized groups to address climate‑related challenges such as flooding, pollution, and greenhouse gas emissions.

== Early life and education ==
Rita Idehai grew up in Nigeria and developed an early interest in environmental issues through her upbringing and academic training. She studied geosciences at Obafemi Awolowo University, where coursework in environmental geophysics sparked her interest in sustainability and human‑environment interactions. After graduating in 2013 and completing national service, she began focusing her career on sustainable waste management as a means of addressing environmental degradation and climate impacts.

== Career ==
In 2018, Idehai founded Ecobarter, a sustainable waste‑management enterprise that leverages innovative systems — including a waste‑to‑currency model and digital platforms — to encourage households and communities to recycle and repurpose waste materials. The organisation’s activities include servicing formal and informal waste collection, recycling and repurposing materials, and deploying technology such as reverse vending machines to incentivize recycling.

Ecobarter has operated across major Nigerian cities including Abuja, Lagos, and Ogun State, engaging thousands of households in waste collection schemes designed to reduce pollution and improve resilience to climate‑related hazards such as flooding. The platform also supports micro‑business development by enabling users to earn points redeemable for cash or services in exchange for recyclable wastes, contributing to a circular economic model.

== Advocacy and impact ==
Idehai’s work is grounded in environmental education and sustainable practice, with a strong focus on community participation and marginalized group empowerment. Ecobarter runs sensitisation programs and collaborates with local communities to promote responsible waste management, reduce environmental pollution, and support livelihoods for informal waste workers and internally displaced women.

By addressing the link between waste management and **climate change impacts** — such as methane emissions from open dumping and blocked drainage systems that worsen flooding — her approach contributes to behavioural change and climate adaptation at the community level.

== Recognition ==
Rita Idehai has received media recognition for her environmental leadership and innovation in sustainable waste management. Publications including TheCable and Empower Africa have featured her as a notable figure in Nigeria’s environmental sustainability landscape. In 2024, Idehai and Ecobarter were recognised as winners of the YouthADAPT Challenge, a climate adaptation initiative by the Global Center on Adaptation and partners, for projects aimed at combating urban flooding through sustainable waste management in Nigerian communities.

== See also ==
- Climate change in Nigeria
- Circular economy
- Waste management
