= Dahiru Muhammad Hashim =

Nigerian doctor and environmentalist

Dr. Dahiru Muhammad Hashim is a Nigerian medical doctor, environmentalist, and public servant. He is the Commissioner for Environment and Climate Change in Kano State, Nigeria, known for spearheading climate resilience projects and environmental policy reforms in the state. Hashim has coordinated major afforestation and land restoration initiatives, led the development of Kano’s Climate Change Policy, and founded a reforestation NGO called the Panacea Foundation. He has represented Kano State at international climate forums including the U.N. Climate Change Conferences and the Africa Climate Summit. Dahiru received national and international honors such as the ISTF Green Award in 2025.

== Early life and education ==
Hashim was born and raised in the Kurna community of Kano State, an area that in his youth was verdant but later suffered severe deforestation. He trained as a medical doctor (earning an M.B.B.Ch. in Egypt in 2019) and initially practiced medicine in Kano. Witnessing rising cases of respiratory and other illnesses linked to environmental degradation, Hashim developed an interest in addressing root environmental causes of public health problems. He pursued additional training in climate leadership and environmental management, positioning him at the intersection of healthcare and environmental policy.

== Environmental career and ACReSAL project ==
Transitioning from clinical practice, Hashim became actively involved in environmental sustainability initiatives in Kano. In 2018, he founded the Panacea Foundation, a non-governmental organization focused on tree planting and environmental education in communities. Through campaigns like #GreenUpKano and a “Catch Them Young” school program, the foundation engaged local youths, traditional leaders, and farmers in planting trees and nurturing green space. Within its first three years, Panacea Foundation was credited with planting over 100,000 trees across Kano State, rejuvenating school grounds, roadsides, and other public areas, and fostering community awareness about climate change.

In 2023, Hashim was appointed the Project Coordinator for the Kano State Agro-Climatic Resilience in Semi-Arid Landscapes (ACReSAL) project – a World Bank-supported climate resilience program. In this role, he led ambitious afforestation and land restoration efforts. By late 2024, the Kano ACReSAL project under Hashim’s leadership had planted over two million trees across rural areas of the state and rehabilitated 106 km of shelterbelts (windbreak forests) to combat desertification. The project also restored about 21,261 hectares of degraded land through tree-planting campaigns, a feat for which the World Bank and Nigeria’s national ACReSAL management unit formally commended Hashim and his team. To sustain these gains, Hashim introduced initiatives such as establishing environmental clubs in schools to educate youth on sustainability and involving local communities in monitoring and protecting newly planted trees. He earned a Leadership Award from the Legislative Writers Forum of the National Assembly in 2024, recognizing his efforts in combating climate change in Kano State

== Commissioner for Environment and Climate Change ==
In late 2024, Governor Abba Kabir Yusuf nominated Dahiru Hashim to serve as Kano State Commissioner for Environment and Climate Change, and he assumed office by January 2025. Upon taking charge of the ministry, Hashim outlined an agenda of strengthening environmental governance, pollution control, and climate adaptation in the state. One of his early initiatives was to introduce new environmental protection laws aimed at curbing pollution. In April 2025, he formally unveiled a set of laws and regulations addressing issues such as industrial waste discharge, indiscriminate dumping, and open defecation These measures included the Kano State Environmental Pollution Control Law 2022 and new Pollution and Waste Control Regulations 2025, which provided stricter enforcement tools against polluters Hashim launched an eight-week public sensitisation campaign to educate residents, businesses, and local authorities on compliance with the new environmental laws. He also coordinated with the state judiciary to establish mobile environmental courts for the swift prosecution of environmental offenses. These reforms, emphasizing public awareness and enforcement, were designed to ensure a cleaner, healthier Kano.

As Commissioner, Hashim continued to advance climate change mitigation and adaptation policies. Notably, he drafted and championed the Kano State Climate Change Policy, which was inaugurated in June 2025. He described the policy as a strategic roadmap aligning Kano’s development with national and global climate objectives, and stressed that meaningful climate action requires a guiding framework. The policy was developed through a participatory process involving at least eight sectoral ministries (including health, commerce, transport, and industry) to ensure it is comprehensive and community-owned. Under Hashim’s guidance, the Ministry of Environment began integrating this climate policy into all relevant sectors and reviewing existing environmental bylaws to create a detailed implementation plan. Observers noted that Kano’s climate policy was one of the first sub-national climate action plans in Nigeria, positioning the state as a leader in localized climate governance.

Hashim also oversaw programs to boost climate resilience and urban greening. He launched annual mass tree-planting campaigns (such as a “3 Million Trees Planting” initiative flagged off in 2024) and secured government approval to strengthen forestry services. In 2025, he announced increases in the salaries and numbers of forest rangers in Kano, to enhance protection of forests against illegal logging. His ministry further pursued projects on waste management and the creation of a circular economy hub to tackle plastic waste (in line with World Environment Day commitments) and advocated for cleaner energy alternatives to reduce deforestation.

== Climate advocacy and international engagement ==
Dahiru Hashim has been active on the global stage as an environmental advocate. He has participated in multiple United Nations Climate Change Conferences as part of Nigeria’s delegation. Notably, he attended the COP27 summit in Sharm El-Sheikh, Egypt in 2022, where he represented Nigeria and contributed to discussions on sustainable solutions. He was subsequently involved in the COP28 summit in Dubai (2023) and COP29 in Baku, Azerbaijan (2024), sharing Kano State’s experiences in climate mitigation and learning from international best practices. Hashim is an official delegate to the UN Framework Convention on Climate Change (UNFCCC) and has been a member of the UNFCCC’s youth constituency, through which he amplifies youth perspectives in climate diplomacy.

In addition to the UN climate conferences, Hashim was a participant in the Africa Climate Summit held in Nairobi, Kenya in September 2023. At that summit – which convened African leaders, experts, and civil society to drive continental climate action – Hashim highlighted Kano’s climate initiatives. He shared insights on providing clean cooking stoves to rural communities to curb deforestation and emphasized community engagement as key to building resilience in semi-arid regions. His presence underscored the role of sub-national actors in the broader climate agenda. Hashim has also engaged with various international networks and training programs: for example, he was selected as a Climate Leadership Fellow (Cohort 4), through which he honed leadership skills for driving climate action globally.

== Awards and honours ==
In May 2025, he received the ISTF Green Award at the International Society of Tropical Foresters (ISTF) Nigeria conference held in Kano. This award – bestowed by a professional forestry and environmental body – honored Hashim’s outstanding leadership in promoting sustainability and forest conservation. During the award ceremony, Hashim dedicated the accolade to all stakeholders working toward a greener Kano, calling it “a recognition of what we’ve achieved together”

Earlier, in December 2024, the Legislative Writers Forum (a media professionals’ forum of the Nigerian National Assembly press corps) presented Hashim with a Leadership Award. The award cited his achievements as the Kano ACReSAL Project Coordinator, particularly his effective climate change interventions at the state level. Hashim has also been commended by the World Bank and Nigeria’s Federal ACReSAL coordinators for restoring over 21,000 hectares of degraded land under the ACReSAL initiative.

Hashim is affiliated with several professional and scientific organizations. He is a member of the Nigerian Environmental Society and has been recognized as a Fellow of the African Institute of Waste Management and Environmental Studies (FAIWMES)

== See also ==
- Climate change in Nigeria
