= Nigeria and the World Bank =

World Bank

The World Bank is an institution that was established in 1944 and since 1958 has provided Nigeria with low interest rate loans and grants through the International Development Association(IDA) and International Bank for Reconstruction and Development (IBRD). As of 2018, it consists of 189 member countries. Its primary goal was to help and rebuild countries after the World War 2. But now, its goal is to eradicate poverty in every member country. After her independence in 1960, Nigeria officially joined the World Bank on March 30, 1961. As the World Bank's goals and outreach in different countries have diversified, they have gradually over the years organized the bank into five agencies to tackle specific issues in low and middle-income countries. Since then, Nigeria has partnered up with the IDA, specifically built to help low income countries and give out loans for very low interest rates, and the IBRD.

== History ==
Nigeria is currently the most populated country in Africa and it is also the biggest oil exporter and in addition to this, it has the second biggest economy in Africa. All of these qualities make it a country with great economic potential, but Nigeria also faces great development challenges. It was not until 1999 that a democratic regime finally took over Nigeria under President Olusegun Obasanjo. From there on relations with the World Bank and Nigeria flourished. The World Bank has been working with Nigeria to reduce the high rate of poverty, create better human capital, diversify the country's revenue through non-oil sectors, and help with economic management. Up until 2004, the World Bank was slow to release funds and most projects were relatively going slow and have proved unsatisfactory. Through 2000 to 2007 the World Bank was set on making reforms in macro stability and governance. According to the World Bank evaluations, this was classified as being moderately satisfactory. The other pillars that were focused on were social service delivery, community empowerment, and creating a basis for non-oil growth. These all proved to be moderately unsatisfactory according to the World Bank evaluation. Although change was slow, by 2007 better results started to come from the projects in Nigeria. In 2016, Nigeria ranked as the 12th highest loan recipient from the World Bank with 6.6 billion dollars. As of 2018, the World Bank has a total of 31 projects in 772 locations in Nigeria. This all adds up to $9.21 billion worth of programs in sectors of like social protection, health, agriculture, fishing, forestry, energy, public administration and other areas in need of refinement. By 2018 the World Bank has approved over 225 projects in Nigeria since 1958, most of which happened through IDA credits and IBRD loans.

== World Bank Success in Nigeria ==
Despite the risks that are associated with most projects, they are carried out by the World Bank and Nigeria with the intention of making the country's infrastructure better. Some have proven to not be successful, but many others have been successful and changed the lives of Nigeria's inhabitants. The World Bank has made progress in many areas like, urban and rural development, energy production, agriculture, etc... The Rural Access and Mobility Project (RAMP) is one of the World Bank's successful projects. This project's aim was to build and rebuild roads to ameliorate social conditions and bring business in certain communities. Since 2008, 150 new river crossings and over 464 kilometers of rural road has been built or improved. This resulted in children finally being able to go to school during the rainy seasons. In addition to this, 4.6 million tons of agricultural produce has been transported compared to the previous amount of 3.5 million tons. It also led to a decrease in cost of transportation and an increase in population in the area; which is still increasing up to this date. Through this period, new small and medium business like fishing farms, poultry farms, sawmills, and new markets submerged alongside these roads. Another successful project was the Nigeria National Energy Development Project (NEPD). It started in 2005 and by the closing of this project in 2012, they manage to deliver more efficient energy to 4.4 million consumers in Nigeria. They connected 40 communities and over 24,600 household all over the country with 8,100 meters of grid. The National Fadama Project has been so successful that it was renewed a second and third time with a slightly different focus each time to keep improving farmers situations while staying on the path of Nigeria's Agricultural Transformation agenda. It is a project that has been active since 1993 and is still going on as of 2018. Over time it has turned the act of farming into a profitable business and has groomed farmers to be “Agro-preneurs”. It has also reduced the level of poverty in areas it was established in.

== Recent focus ==
Although there has been progress through recent projects in Nigeria, more needs to be done to bring the country up to speed. In July 2018, The World Bank decided to extend its Country Partnership Strategy with Nigeria until June 30, 2019. In doing so, 7 new projects worth $2.1 billion were approved to start in Nigeria. These projects will be carried out through multiple IDA credits. The main focus of these projects is on key sectors that will lead to economic growth and stability in the upcoming years alongside the Economic Recovery and Growth Plan (ERGP). Through this, the already existing Nigeria Erosion and Watershed Management Project (NEWMAP) was also funded with $400 million to reduce and work against soil and gully erosion and land degradation in several states across Nigeria. NEWMAP was created by the World Bank and Federal Ministry of Environment after president Goodluck Jonathan asked the World Bank to intervene and help with the erosion in Southeastern Nigeria and land degradation in the North.

=== Sub national/central government ===
$750 million has been released toward the State Fiscal Transparency, Accountability and Sustainability Project and $125 million towards the Fiscal Governance and Institutions Project. These two projects will work together in order to strengthen the fiscal transparency and make national statistic records and public finance credible. This will result in a boost in trust of the government. Through these projects they will make sure to properly oversee that resources towards services such as education, health, and water are being properly allocated. These PforR (Program for Result) projects approved on July 27, 2018, will continue until December 2022.

=== Human development: health and gender ===
A total of $232 million will be allocated toward The Accelerating Nutrition Results in Nigeria Project. $225 million coming from IDA credits and the other 7 million as a grant from the Global Financing Facility. This project is set to close in December 2023. In Nigeria, Malnutrition rates since 2008 have not changed on a large scale. They have had a history of long-term malnutrition that is spread out unevenly across Nigeria. Malnutrition is affecting about 44% percent of children under the age of five. Putting them at risk of not developing to their fullest potential or at risk of dying. This project is aimed toward pregnant women, adolescent girls, and children under the age of five. It will benefit over 8.7 million people.$150 million IDA credits is being put toward the Nigeria Polio Eradication Support Project part of the effort to eradicate polio worldwide. This project will bring oral polio immunizations to at least 80% national target in each Nigerian states participating. This will help reduce infant mortality and lessen risks of polio in both adults and children. The Nigeria women project is targeting women over the age of 18 and will directly benefit a total of 324,000 women all across Nigeria, motivating them to become members of Women Affinity Groups (WAG) that will bring about proper training and skill enhancements that will introduce more women into the Nigerian economic sector. This project focuses on women economic empowerment and paves a way for their voices to be heard. This is the first World Bank project in Nigeria to focus mainly on one specific gender. It is funded through $100 million credit from the IDA.

=== Energy ===
The Nigeria Electrification Project (NEP) is being financed through $350 million IDA credits from the World Bank. The goal is to be able to provide long-term and reliable electricity to households, small and medium enterprises, universities, and teaching hospital through solar hybrid mini grids and stand-alone solar systems. The North Core/Dorsale Nord Regional Power Inter-connector Project was approved in 2018 as a joint project that will not only help Nigeria, but also Benin, Burkina Faso and Niger. Connecting these four countries to high voltage transmission lines will enable to take part in an effective regional energy trade. The World Bank has committed $465.5 million towards this project. $275.6 million came in the form of credit and the rest as a grant from the IDA. As a result, this project will bring more reliable and affordable electricity to households and businesses. Therefore, creating competition in businesses that will help business grow and create jobs and help the economy in each sovereign state.
