= National Agency for the Great Green Walls =

National Agency for the Great Green Wall (NAGGW)
- Abbreviation: NAGGW
- Founder: Federal Government of Nigeria
- Type: Federal Government Agency
- Purpose: Climate Change
- Headquarters: Abuja, Nigeria
- Region served: Nigeria
- Owner: Federal Republic of Nigeria
- Key people: Alhaji Saleh Abubakar

The National Agency for the Great Green Wall (NAGGW) is a Nigerian federal agency under the Federal Ministry of Environment (Nigeria), established to address land degradation and desertification, boost food security and support communities to adapt to climate change in the Nigerian states of Sokoto, Kebbi, Kastina, Zamfara, Kano, Jigawa, Bauchi, Gombe, Yobe, Borno, and Adamawa. The NAGGW serves as the Nigerian focal point for the actualisation of the vision of the African Union’s Great Green Wall of the Sahara and the Sahel project. The mission of the NAGGW is to halt and reverse land degradation, prevent depletion of biological diversity, ensure that by 2025, ecosystems are resilient to climate change and continue to provide essential services that would contribute to human welfare and poverty eradication.

== History ==
The National Agency for the Great Green Wall (NAGGW) was established by Act of Parliament in 2015 to implement the vision of the African Union and its Heads and State of Governments Great Green Wall of the Sahara and the Sahel project Initiative (GGWSSI) of 2007. The initiative centred on the efforts to combat land degradation, drought and desertification and other menace orchestrated by impacts of climate change and a strive in the implementation process to improve on the livelihoods of the affected communities and reduce apparent manifestation of poverty and building the resilience of the people on the phenomena of climate change. The scope of the implementation process of the GGW programme covers the northern frontline States (Adamawa, Borno, Bauchi, Gombe, Jigawa, Kano, Katsina, Zamfara, Sokoto, Kebbi, and Yobe).

== Intervention and projects ==
- Ecological Fund Supporting Great Green Wall Activities (EFO)
- Massive afforestation and reforestation activities supported by the Natural Resources Development Fund (NRDF);
- Action Against Desertification (AAD) Project supported by the Food and Agriculture Organization (FAO) of the United Nations and the European Union (EU).

== Leadership ==
The agency is headed by a Director General appointed by the President of the Federal Republic of Nigeria, responsible for the execution of the policies, programmes and plans as approved by the council; and the day-to-day administration of the Agency. The current DG is Saleh Abubakar who was appointed by President Bola Tinubu in 2024.
