= Federal Ministry of Environment (Nigeria) =

Government organization in Abuja, Nigeria

Organisation overview
- Jurisdiction: Government of Nigeria
- Headquarters: Abuja, Nigeria
- Organisation executive: Balarabe Abbas Lawal, Minister of the Environment
- Website: environment.gov.ng

The Federal Ministry of Environment is a ministry of the Federal Government of Nigeria created in 1999 with a mandate to address environmental issues and to ensure the effective coordination of all environmental matters in the country. The ministry works to ensure the control of environmental issues and the protection and conservation of natural resources. It also formulates policies and supervises activities for curbing desertification and deforestation; the management of flood, erosion and pollution; as well as climate change and clean energy.

Balarabe Abbas Lawal is the current Minister of Environment. He took charge of the affairs of the ministry in 2023 after he was appointed by President Bola Ahmed Tinubu.

== Responsibilities ==
The ministry plays various roles involving the national goals on desertification, deforestation, pollution, and waste management. It also superintends over climate change and clean energy issues and enforces environmental standards and regulations in different parts of the country.

== Agencies ==
The ministry fulfils its responsibilities through its departments and parastatals. Some of these parastatals include:

- National Biosafety Management Agency (NBMA)
- National Park Service (NPS)
- National Agency for the Great Green Wall
- National Oil Spill Detection and Response Agency (NOSDRA)
- National Environmental Standards and Regulations Enforcement Agency (NESREA)

The ministry also supervises and provides fund for research institutes such as the Forestry Research Institute of Nigeria (FRIN), and the Environmental Health and Registration Council of Nigeria (EHORECON), among others.

== Ministers of Environment ==
- Bala Mohammed Mande (2003–2005)
- Iyorchia Ayu (June 2005–December 2005)
- Helen Esuene (January 2006–January 2007)
- Halima Tayo Alao (26 July 2007 – 29 October 2008)
- John Odey (17 December 2008–March 2010)
- Lawencia Mallam (2014–2015)
- Amina Mohammed (11 November 2015 – 15 December 2016)
- Mohammad Mahmood Abubakar (2021–2022)
- Mohammed Hassan Abdullahi (6 April 2022 – 29 May 2023)
- Balarabe Abbas Lawal (since 9 October 2023)

== Achievements of the Ministry ==
One of the major achievements of the Federal Ministry of Environment is the initiation of the Ogoniland clean-up programme of the Nigerian government. Ogoniland is one of the communities in the oil-rich Niger Delta region that has been devastated by the exploration activities of oil-producing companies. Other achievements of the ministry and its parastatals include the Clean and Green initiatives in the States of Nigeria, the Great Green Wall Programme, and the Nigeria Erosion and Watershed Management Project.
