= Abdulkadir Meyere =

Nigerian physician and politician

Abdulkadir Muazu Meyere

Secretary to the State Government of Kaduna State
- Incumbent
- Assumed office October 2023
- Governor: Uba Sani
- Preceded by: Balarabe Abbas Lawal

Personal details
- Born: 1960s Kaduna State, Nigeria
- Occupation: Physician, civil servant, politician

Abdulkadir Muazu Meyere (born 1960s) is a Nigerian physician, civil servant, and politician. He worked for more than three decades in the Federal Public Service, holding senior positions across several ministries, and in October 2023 was appointed Secretary to the State Government of Kaduna State.

== Career ==
Meyere began his service in the Federal Public Service as a Medical Officer II. He later advanced through various roles and, in 2011, became Director of Sports Medicine at the Federal Ministry of Youth and Sports. In 2017, he was appointed a Federal Permanent Secretary. During his tenure, he served in ministries including the Federal Ministry of Mines and Steel Development and the Federal Ministry of Agriculture and Rural Development, before retiring from the federal civil service.

After leaving federal service, Meyere worked as Senior National Consultant to the Food and Agriculture Organization of the United Nations on the "Hand in Hand Initiative in Nigeria". This programme involved collaboration with federal ministries, agencies, and selected states to advance Sustainable Development Goals 1 and 2.

In October 2023, Governor Uba Sani appointed him Secretary to the State Government of Kaduna, succeeding Balarabe Abbas Lawal.
