= Nigeria gully erosion crisis =

Environmental disaster

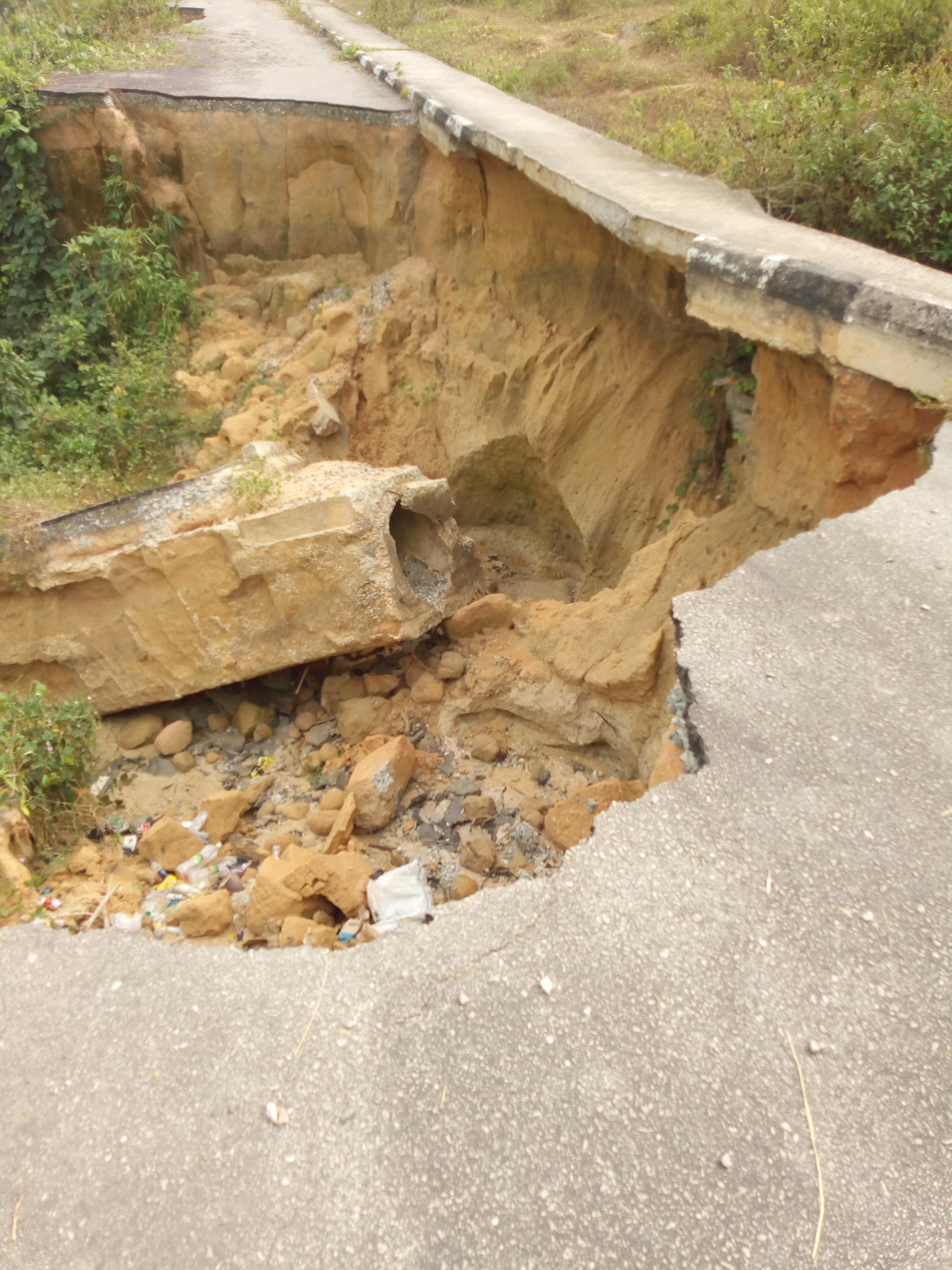
A gully in Calabar, Nigeria

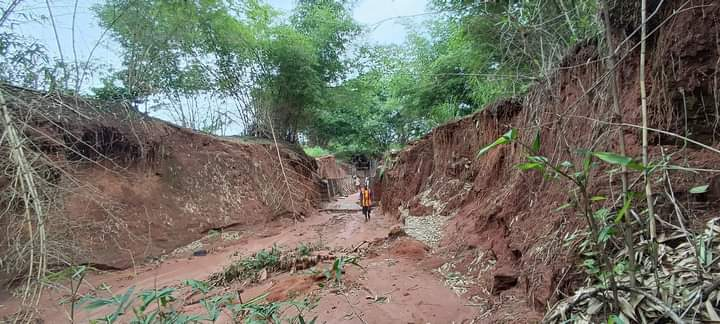
Impact of gully erosion

The Nigerian gully erosion crisis has been underway since before 1980. It is an ecological, environmental, economic, and humanitarian disaster resulting in land degradation, as well as the loss of lives and properties worth millions of dollars. The estimated number of gullies in the country is at 3,000.

Gully erosions occur due to sandy soil being unable to withstand the run-off and eventually eroding away, leaving gaping gullies that swallow homes and other infrastructure. Gullies and areas exposed to erosion in South Eastern Nigeria tripled from about 1.33% (1,021 km^{2}) in 1976 to about 3.7% (2,820 km^{2}) in 2006, making the region the most affected in the country.

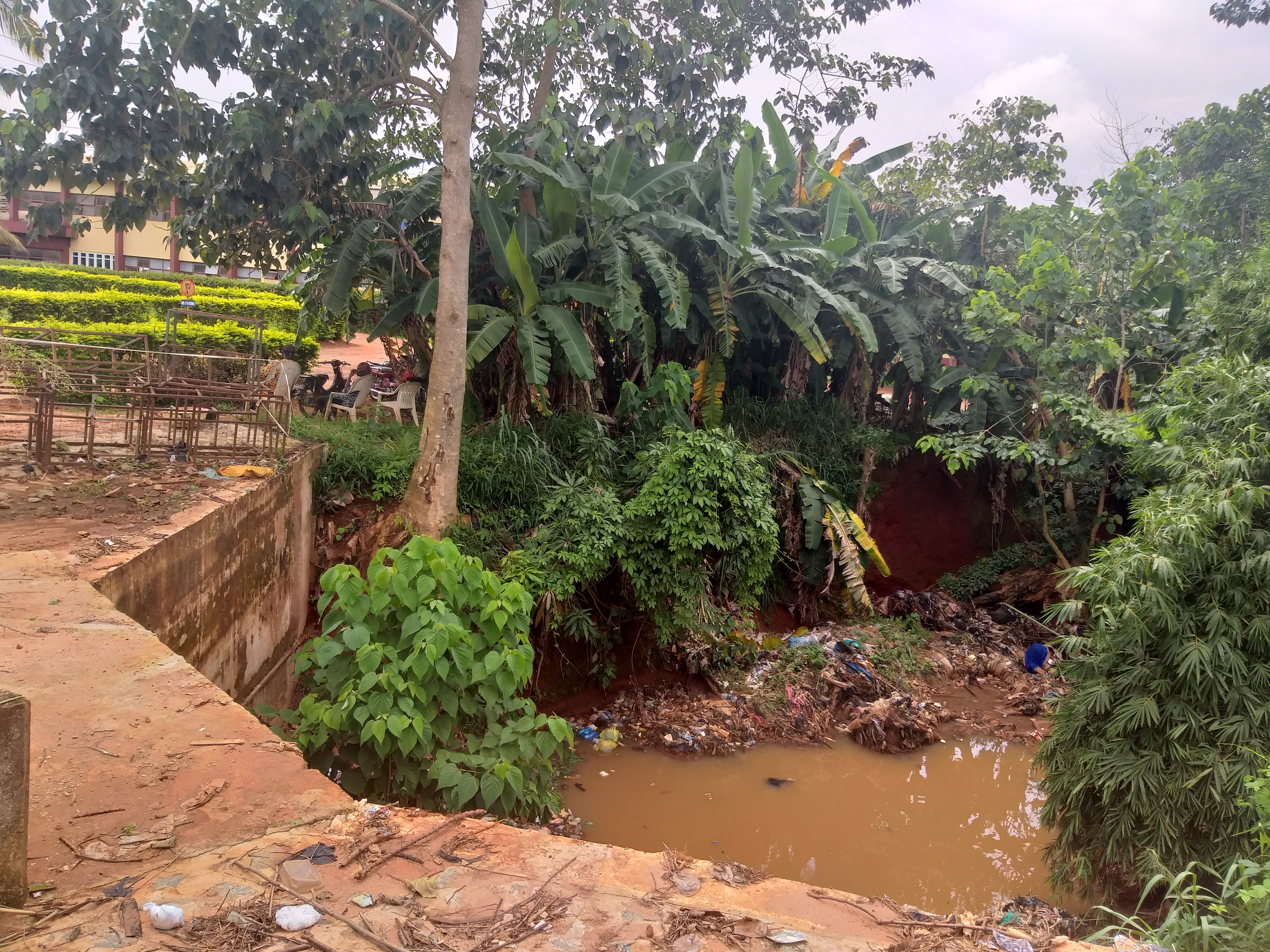
Gully erosion at University of Nigeria Secondary School, Nsukka, Nigeria, South East.

The South East region of Nigeria has suffered then environmental hazard of this erosion for long, mostly as a result of heavy rainfall leading to flooding. The change in climate has been referenced as the cause. Many farms, homes and other buildings have been affected.

== Causes ==
Gullies are majorly caused by surface runoff. The erosion occurs notably in gullies, which grow wider and deeper with each rainfall. Many of the gullies have become ravines, which can be dozens or hundreds of feet deep. Some natural processes can bring about gullies, such as heavy rainfall, poor soil infiltration and unfavorable catchment shape.

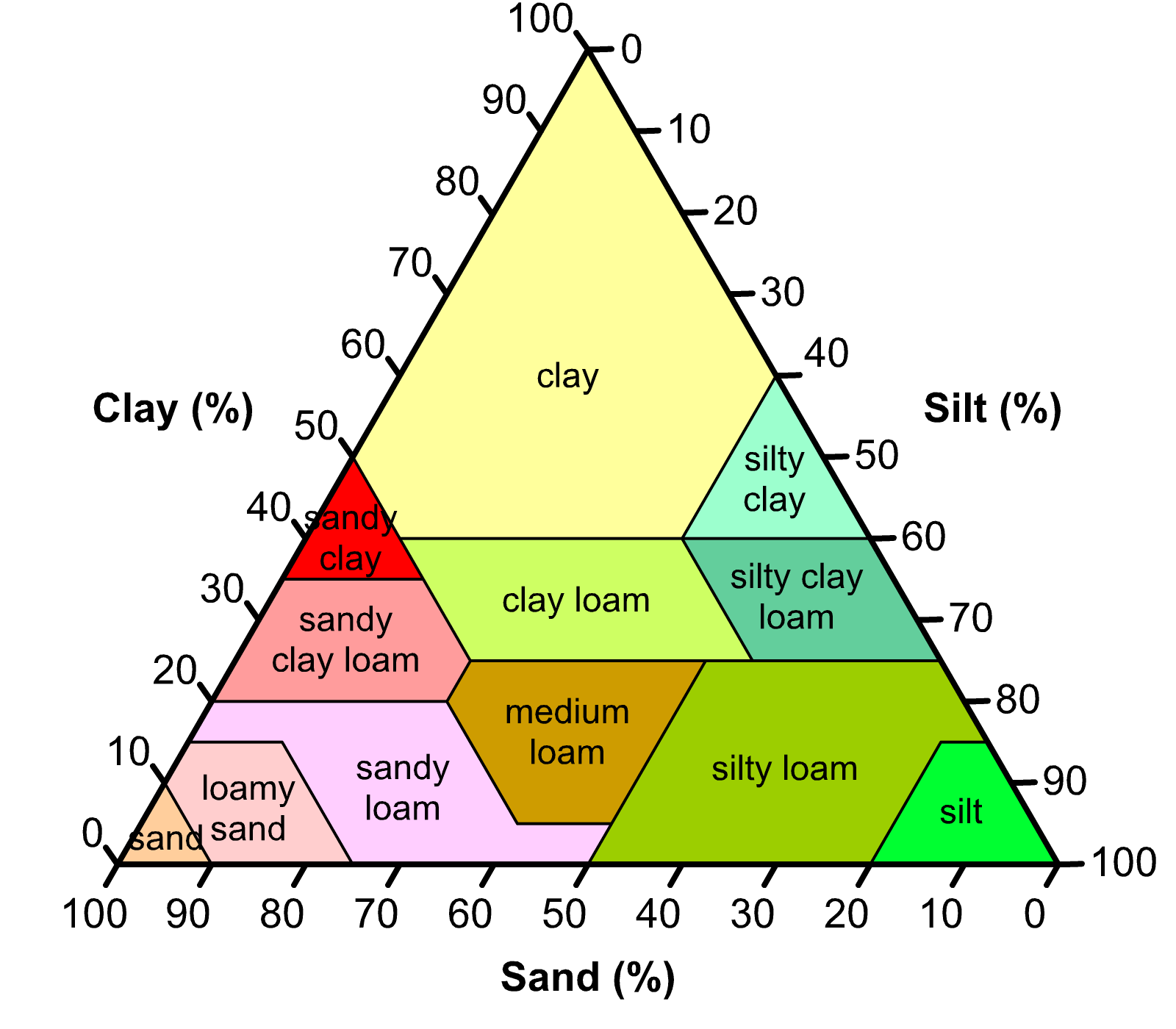
Zephyris (Richard Wheeler)- Soil types by clay, silt and sand composition

The process of gully formation is expedited by the types of soil in South Eastern Nigeria: sandy clay and loamy sand. These are soil types that have greater amounts of sand than clay, loam, or silt.

The soil type or texture determines how water flows through it. Soil types with predominantly sandy characteristics allow for pockets of space that water easily moves through. For this reason, sandy soils do not have the ability to hold nutrients and support plant life. Without plants extending their roots into the soil and solidifying it, the chances of soil erosion increase even more. Since erosion plays a large role in soil depletion in this area, it is important to consider fertilization and irrigation when attempting to grow crops.

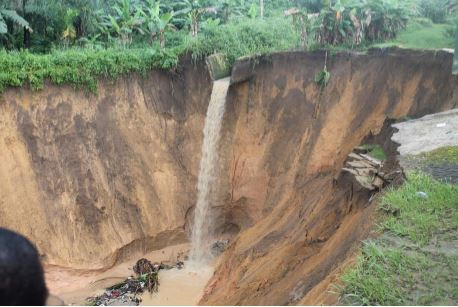
Poorly terminated drain, a major cause of gully erosion

Climate in Nigeria has an extreme impact on the gully formations. For an area that is predominantly dry, the intensity of the rain often leads to flooding and large amounts of water in one location. The rainfall in Nigeria can be considered aggressive, with large raindrop sizes and high amounts being released at once. The texture of soil cannot support the water and thus erodes away, and with no vegetation, the process is sped up. However, in Nigeria, the more significant causes of gully formation can be largely attributed to human activities such as:

- Poor road design, construction and abrupt termination of drains: When drains are not properly terminated, the flow in them, usually with high pressure, will disperse the earth below, causing gullies rather than flow to lower catchment areas.
- Poor waste management practices: poor waste management practices such as dumping of refuse into drains and waterways prevent the proper flow of water. This practice results in flooding and if unchecked, it can lead to erosion of the top layer of the soil.
- Unsustainable land use practices: practices such as improper sand mining strips away the top soil and tilling process associated with crop cultivation loosens the top soil, creating paths for runoff.

Though concentrated in several towns and states in the south-eastern part of the country, the crisis affects all Nigerians indirectly. Homes and structures routinely collapse, as the gullies expand with each rainy season. Unchecked, the phenomenon will eventually transform the region into a badland.

== Topography ==
The topography of South Eastern Nigeria determines its vulnerability to water erosion. There are three types in the area: plains and lowlands, uplands, and highlands. The highlands, which consist of cuesta landscapes, are resistant to erosion due to their soil composition, but they serve as paths for the water to runoff and erode the lowland areas.

A geomorphologist, G. Ofomata, discovered a relationship between the slope of the hills and the severity of the erosion occurring. On a 15 percent slope, there was a much greater total soil loss than on a compared 1 percent slope. Regardless if they are convex or concave, the sloped lowlands are at risk, due to their poor soil characteristics and the angle at which the soil can erode.

== Impact ==
There are two levels of impact caused by gully formations:

- Environmental Impact
- A loss of agricultural land results in less vegetation, which is unable to support the soil, thus causing more erosion.
- There is increased siltation in rivers leading to flooding, negatively impact aquatic life in Nigeria, such as characin and torpedo robbers.
- With increased sedimentation in waterways, water quality is reduced and reservoirs are more likely to need treatment at water utilities.
- Mammals, birds, and plants are predominately affected by the erosion crisis.
- Inaccessible roads.
- Unfavorable catchment shape.
- Human impact
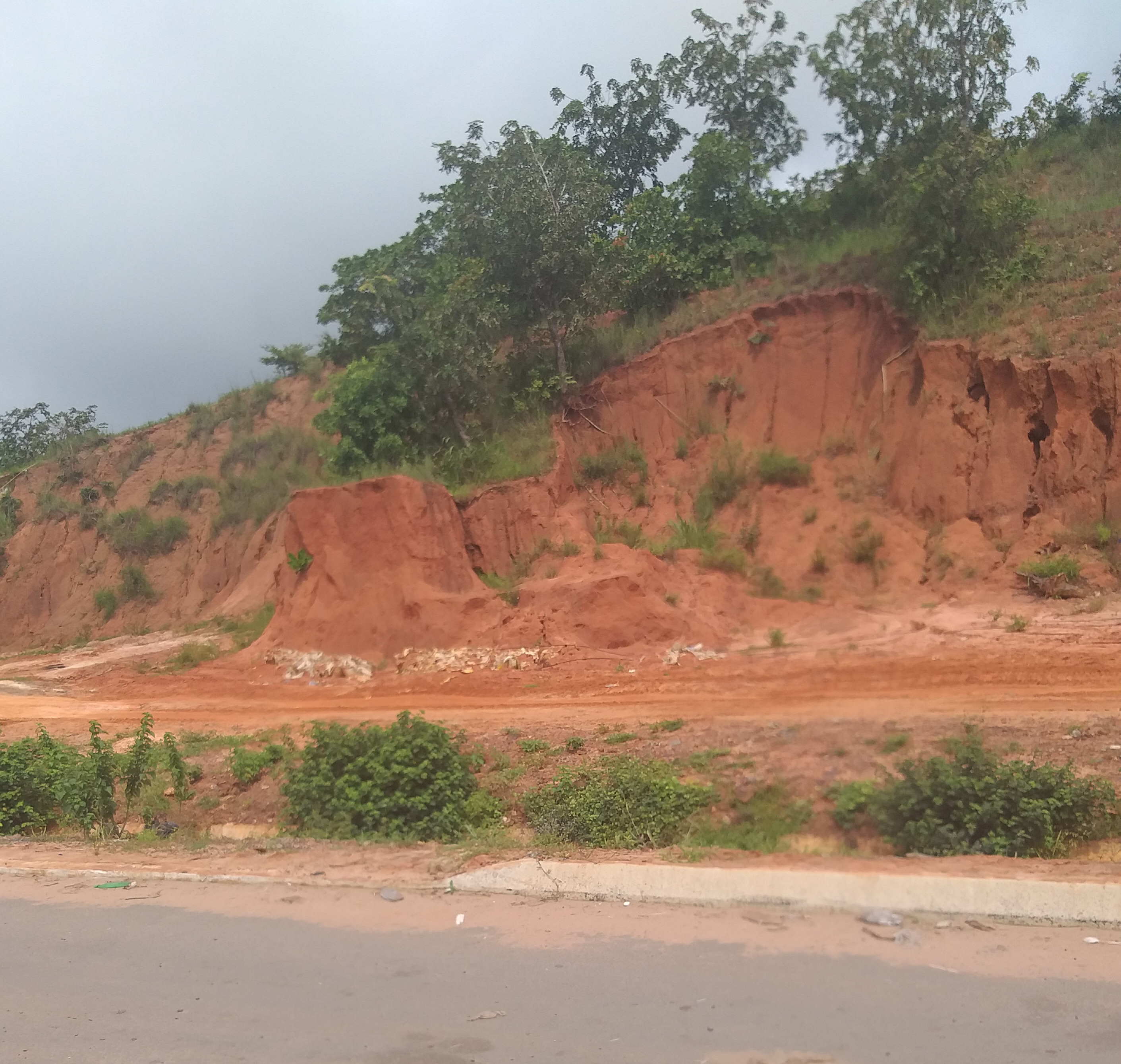
- Impact of gully erosion on roads, along 9th mile road Enugu, Nigeria.
  Loss of infrastructure including roads, houses, and other real estate.
- Loss of food sources due to less agricultural land.
- Thousands displaced following the gully incidences.People are unable to take their farm products to the market

== Major interventions ==
In 2010, President Goodluck Ebele Jonathan made a request to the World Bank Nigeria office for assistance in addressing the challenges of gully erosion, emerging Land degradation and environmental insecurity in the country. This request resulted in the formation of the Nigeria Erosion and Watershed Management Project (NEWMAP), an eight-year multi-sectoral project aimed at addressing gully erosion in the Southern Nigeria and land degradation in the Northern Nigeria. The development objective of the NEWMAP is to reduce vulnerability to soil erosion in targeted sub-watersheds with a portfolio of US$508 million plus an additional financing of $400 million.

Before this intervention, several interventions failed to address the challenge of gully erosion mainly because of inefficiencies in designing proper structures and lack of commitment by the locals to take action. However, in some areas like Madona gully site, Awhum community Enugu State, and Okudu community Imo State, some sustainable interventions base on good practices were employed. These interventions addressed the problem of gully erosion in those areas.

== See also ==
- Soil erosion
