= Climate change in Nigeria =

Emissions, impacts and response of Nigeria related to climate change

Satellite image of Lake Chad, showing it shrinking between 1984 and 2018

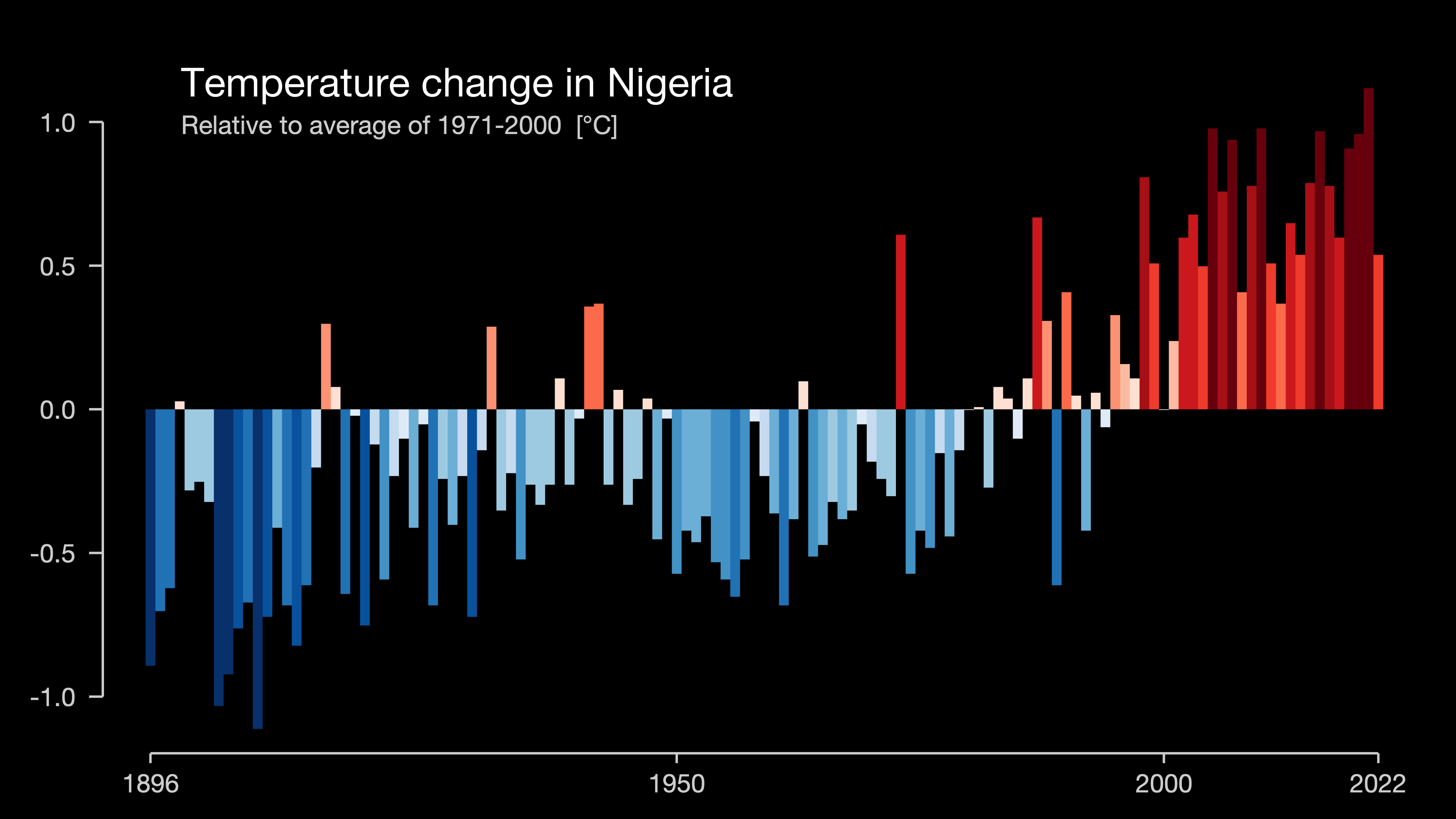
Temperature change in Nigeria; each bar represents the average temperature over that year.

Climate change in Nigeria has caused increasing temperatures and rainfall variability (increasing in coastal areas and declining in continental areas) resulting in drought, desertification, rising sea levels, erosion, floods, thunderstorms, bush fires, landslides, land degradation and more frequent, extreme weather conditions. Climate change is leading to biodiversity loss, reduced food and water security, increasing poverty, conflict, displacement, economic instability and negative health outcomes in Nigeria. Nigeria is highly vulnerable to and not well prepared to deal with the effects of climate change. The agricultural sector is particularly most vulnerable.

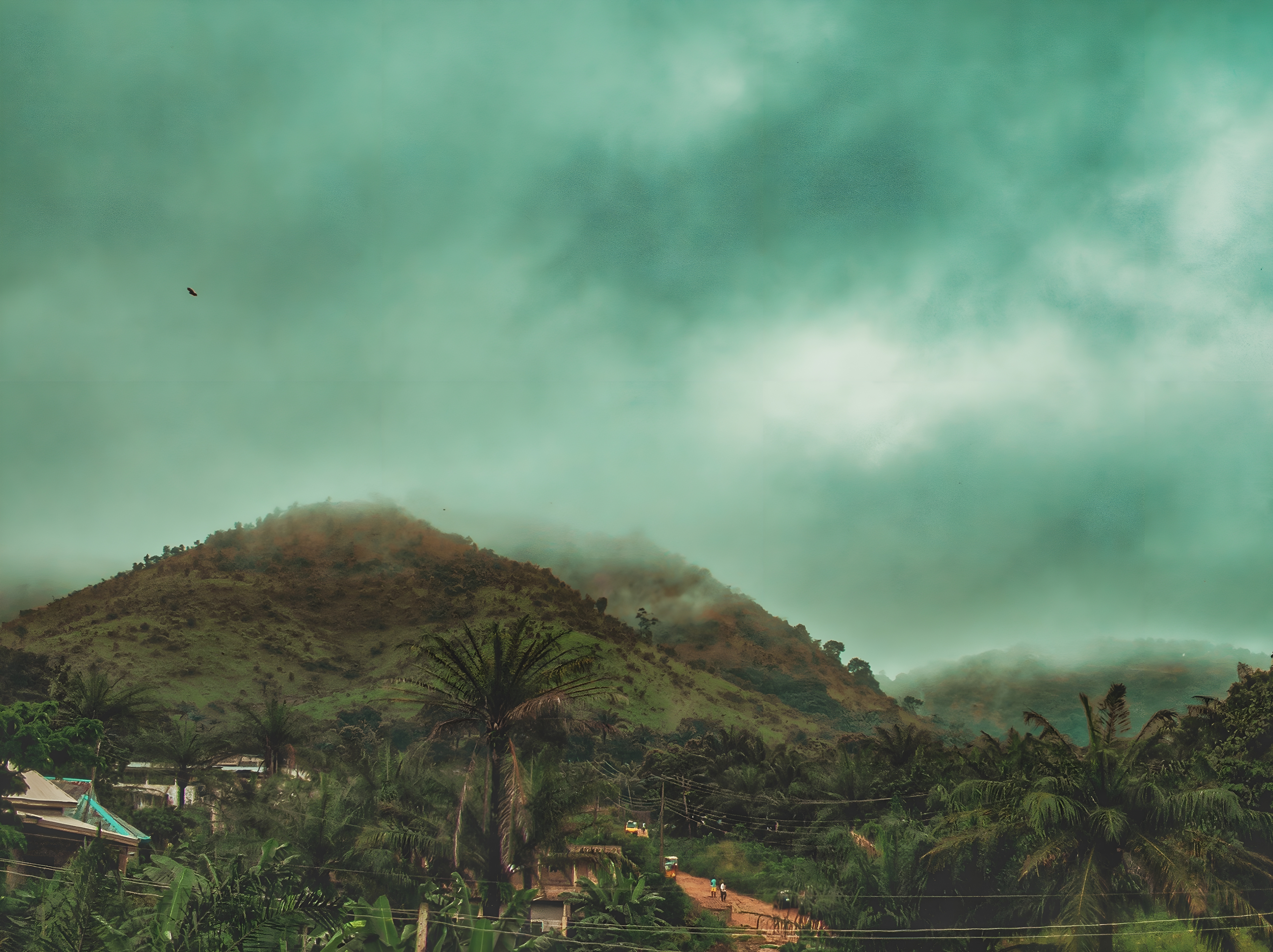
A thick layer of Harmattan fog in Enugu State

Nigeria is in the top 25 highest greenhouse gas emitters, contributing 0.8% of the global total emissions. Nigeria has committed to cut greenhouse gas emissions by 20% on its own, and by 47% if it receives international support, by 2030. The country has also committed to net zero by 2060. Nigeria's climate change mitigation and adaptation plans focus on agriculture and food security (through e.g.: climate-smart agriculture), forests and biodiversity, water resources, energy and infrastructure (e.g.: transitioning to renewable energies like solar), health, human settlement, industry and commerce, transportation and communication. While there is some discussion about necessary capacity building at the individual, group and community level to engage in climate change responses, there is less attention given to higher levels of capacity building at the state and national level.

The challenges of climate change are not the same across all geographical areas of the country. This is because of the two precipitation regimes: high precipitation in parts of the Southeast and Southwest and low in the Northern Region. These regimes can result in aridity, desertification and drought in the north; erosion and flooding in the south and other regions.

== Greenhouse gas emissions ==
Cumulative greenhouse gas emissions by country and region - bar chart

In the year 2023, Nigeria's total greenhouse gas emissions was 60.73 million metric tons of carbon dioxide equivalent (MtCO2e), which is less than 0.8% of global emissions. This means that emissions per person per year is less than 2 tons, compared to the global average of over 6 tons. However, Nigeria is in the top 25 highest emitters in the world. These greenhouse gases, mainly carbon dioxide and methane are mostly generated from oil and gas production, land-use change, forestry, agriculture and fugitive emissions. The economy is very dependent on oil production, so it may be hard to reach the target of net zero emissions by 2060.

Economists say that gasoline subsidies are "ruinous". It is recorded that the transportation sector is responsible for 28% of the greenhouse gas emissions in 2021. The main source of these emissions is the combustion of fossil fuels, such as gasoline and diesel, in cars. The production of electricity, which makes up 25% of emissions, also adds to the emissions of greenhouse gases. The industrial sector, responsible for 23% of emissions, mostly employs fossil fuels for chemical reactions and energy production. 13% of emissions, including heat and refrigeration in buildings, come from the commercial and residential sectors. Livestock and agricultural soils are the main sources of agriculture, which contributes 10% of emissions. 12% of emissions are offset by land use and forestry, since managed forests have been a net sink for emissions since 1990.

In order to warm the biosphere to a temperature suitable for human habitation, greenhouse gases (GHGs) absorb and reemit a considerable portion of the 161 W m−2, making them indispensable for life on Earth. Global surface temperatures have recently increased due to biosphere warming caused by rising GHG concentrations in the atmosphere. Since 1750, agriculture has produced 10–14% of all anthropogenic greenhouse gas emissions worldwide each year, directly influencing five of the main radiative sources of climate forcing. More greenhouse gases are impacted by agriculture than not.

== Impacts on the natural environment ==
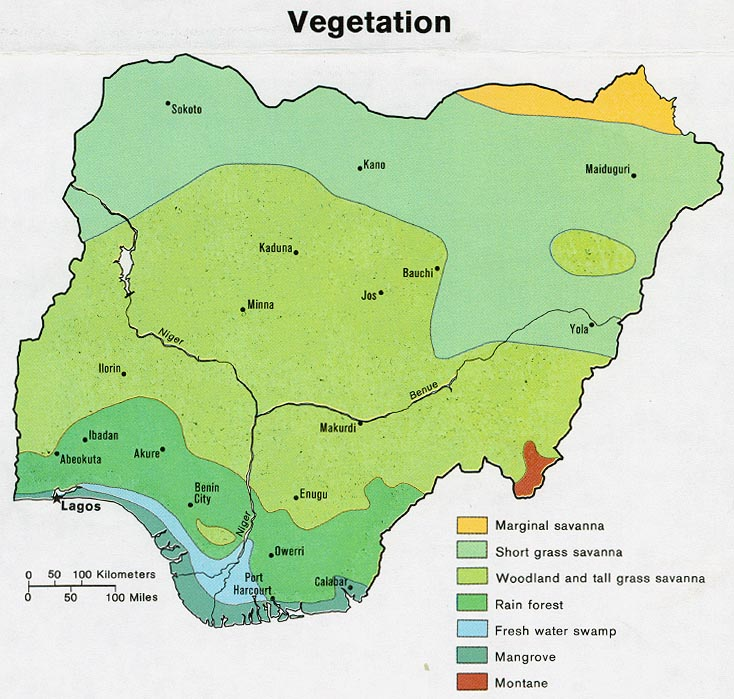
Vegetation cover map of Nigeria in 1979

Köppen climate classification map for Nigeria for 1980–2016

2071–2100 map under the most intense climate change scenario. Mid-range scenarios are currently considered more likely.

=== Current climate ===
Nigeria has three different climate zones: a Sahelian hot and semi-arid climate in the north, a tropical monsoon climate in the south, and a tropical savannah environment in the center regions. While the core regions only get one rainy and one dry season, the southern parts see heavy rainfall from March to October. There is a lot of annual variances in the north, which causes droughts and flooding. The mean annual temperature of the country varies greatly between coastal and interior regions; the plateau has a mean temperature between 21 °C and 27 °C, while the interior lowlands typically see temperatures above 27 °C. There is variation in rainfall from April to October, and the average annual temperature is 26.9 °C.

Nigeria has a tropical climate with two seasons: (wet and dry). Inland areas especially those in the northeast, experience the greatest fluctuations in temperatures as before the outset of rains, temperatures sometimes rise as high as 44 °C and drops to 6 °C between December and February. In Maiduguri, the maximum temperature may rise to 38 °C in April and May while in the same season frosts might occur at night.

For example, in Lagos, the average high is 31 °C and low is 23 °C in January and 28 °C and 23 °C in June. The southeast regions especially located around the coast like Bonny Island (south of Port Harcourt), east of Calabar receive the highest amount of annual rainfalls of around 4,000 millimeters.

==== Changes in climate ====
Climate change in Nigeria is shifting climate regions. The desert region in the North is receding North, steppe (Grassland) region in the North is set to expand southwards, the tropical savanna climate is expanding, and tropical monsoon regions in the South are moving northwards, replacing tropical rainforest.

==== Increase in temperature ====
The effects of the temperature increase are unbearable for residents, particularly those living in communities hosting gas flare plants. The increase in temperature causes bodily rashes, among other things, and hinders the growth of food crops. According to the journal of environmental and occupational health, anthropogenic activities of human causes damage to the environment such as increase in global warming. The availability of nutrients, plant and root growth, and seed germination are all affected by soil temperature. High temperatures hinder a plant's regular growth, photosynthesis, and flowering since they do not improve plant physiology.

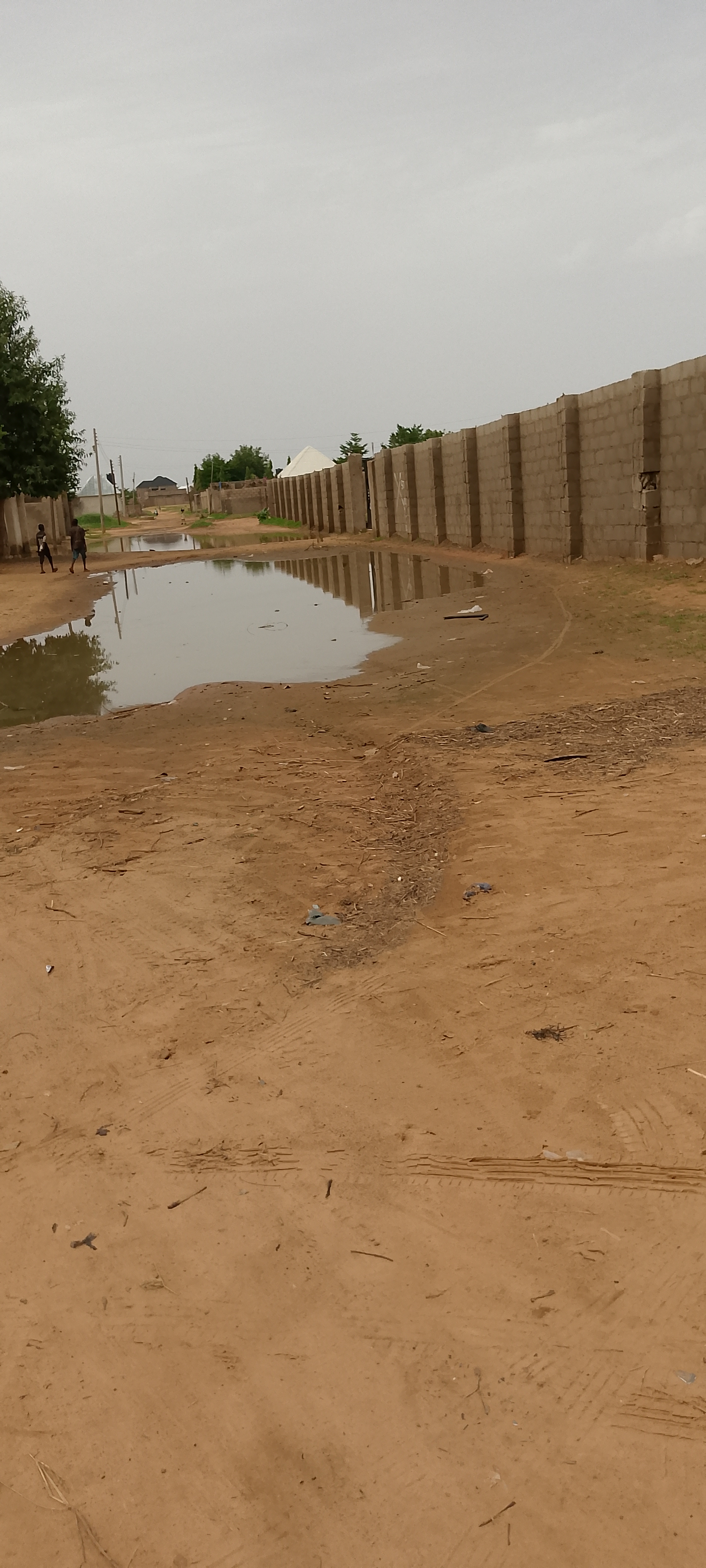
Nigerian flood

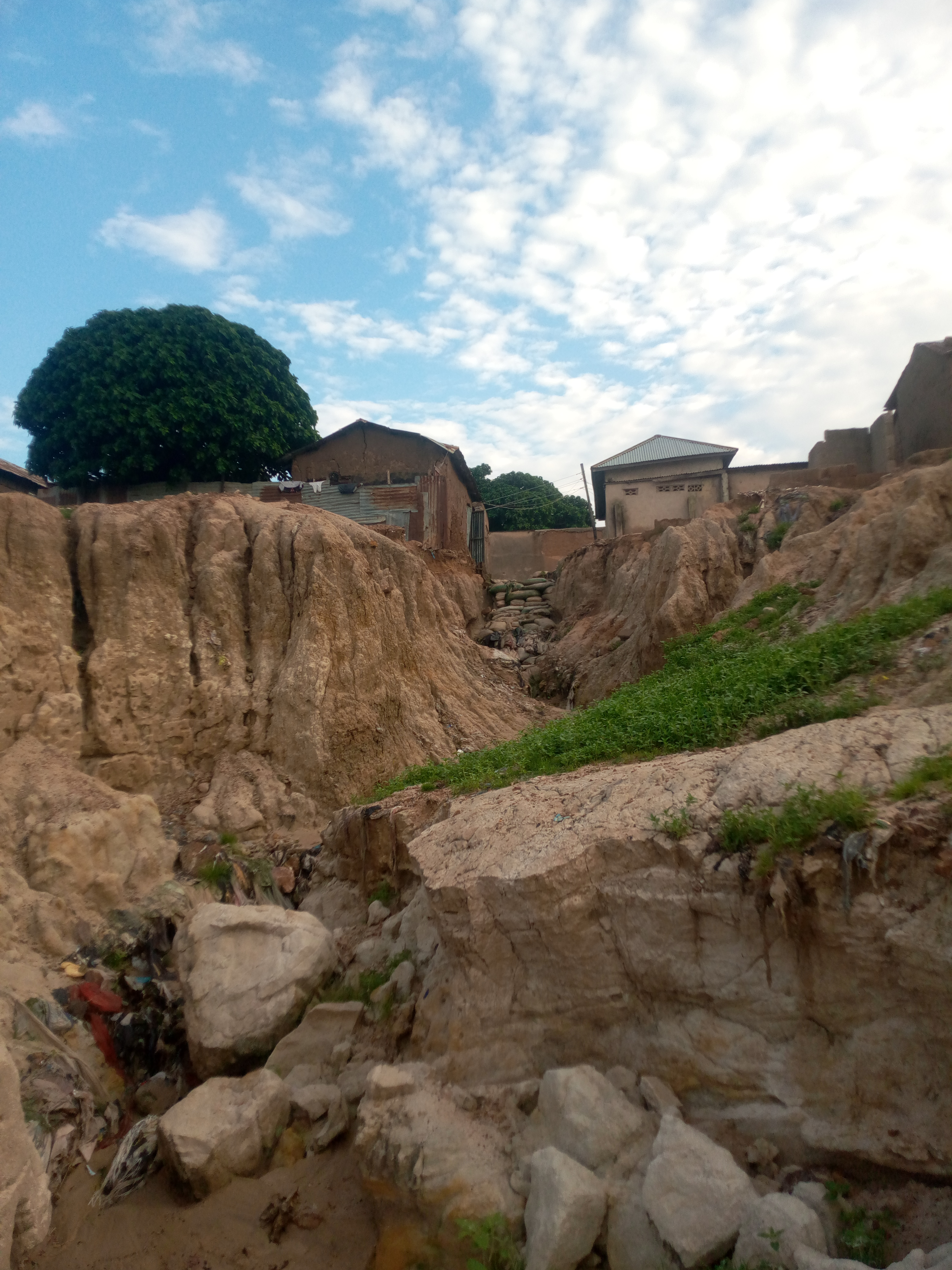
land degradation (Erosion crisis)

Rising sea levels, fluctuating rainfall, higher temperatures, flooding, droughts, desertification, land degradation, and an increase in the frequency of extreme weather events are all contributing factors to Nigeria's changing climate. Forecasts indicate that this will continue to cause significant runoffs and flooding in several locations. Forecasts of the climate indicate that every biological zone will see a notable rise in temperature. Although there is some literature showing the effects of and solutions to climate change, the majority of it concentrates on the farming industry and specific farming locales. Increased focus must be paid to capacity building at the state and federal levels, as well as increased implementation of mitigation and adaptation measures.

The Nigerian Meteorological Service (NiMet) issues a warning about rising temperatures, especially in the north, which can lead to an increase in hospital admissions for elderly patients, neonates, and children due to heatstroke, cardiovascular, respiratory, and cerebrovascular illnesses.

Due to climate change, Northern Nigeria is seeing greater heatwaves and lengthier, more erratic rainfall. New problems such extreme droughts, floods, deforestation, pollution, and food shortages have resulted from this. Daily living has been impacted by climate change, and many individuals have had to modify their behavior to cope. Due to the heat, some students have missed class or experienced health issues. Others have fallen behind in their academics and suffered from migraines. The extra strain might have a disastrous effect on Nigeria's underfunded, overcrowded, and fiercely competitive educational system.

According to historical data from 2012 to 2019 used to examine trends in temperature and rainfall in Agbani, Enugu State. The climate from 2020 to 2050 was forecasted via Trend Regression analysis to be wetter and hotter. In 2018 and 2015 there were the most and lowest amounts of rainfall, respectively. The months of January, July, and March had the highest monthly mean rainfall, respectively. Also, between 2020 and 2050, farmers expect a wetter environment.

=== Ecosystems ===
An ecosystem is a complex and interconnected community of living organisms, their physical environment, and the interactions between them. The concept of ecosystems was first introduced by the British ecologist Arthur Tansley in 1935, who defined it as "the whole system. including not only the organism-complex, but also the whole complex of physical factors forming what we call the environment". This definition highlights the importance of considering both living organisms and their environment when studying ecosystems.

Ecosystems are characterized by the flow of energy and the cycling of nutrients. Energy enters an ecosystem through primary producers, such as plants or algae, which capture sunlight and convert it into chemical energy through photosynthesis. This energy is then transferred to higher trophic levels as organisms feed on each other, forming food chains and food webs.

Ecosystems are sustained by the cycling of nutrients. Nutrients, such as carbon, nitrogen, and phosphorus, are essential for the growth and survival of organisms. These elements are recycled within the ecosystem through various processes like decomposition, nutrient uptake by plants, and consumption by animals. This recycling ensures a continuous supply of nutrients for the organisms within the ecosystem.

Ecosystems provide numerous ecological services that are vital for the well-being of both the natural world and human society. For instance, forests act as carbon sinks, absorbing and storing large amounts of carbon dioxide, a greenhouse gas that contributes to climate change. Wetlands play a crucial role in water purification and flood control. Coral reefs provide habitat for numerous marine species and act as natural barriers against storms.

Ecosystems are facing numerous threats due to human activities, such as deforestation, pollution, climate change, and habitat destruction (Millennium Ecosystem Assessment, 2005). These disturbances can disrupt the delicate balance of an ecosystem, leading to species extinction, loss of biodiversity, and the degradation of ecosystem services.

To better understand and manage ecosystems, scientists employ various approaches, including ecological modeling, field observations, and experimentation. These tools help researchers study the interactions between organisms, identify key ecological processes, and assess the impacts of human activities on ecosystems. Ecosystem management strategies aim to promote sustainable practices that maintain or restore the integrity and functioning of ecosystems.

Years ago, Nigeria experienced climate change disaster which happened in the Northeastern region which is now Borno and Yobe states the territory along the southern part of Lake Chad dried up. Due to logging and over dependence on firewood for cooking, a greater part of Nigeria's Guinean forest-savanna mosaic region has been stripped of its vegetation cover. Similarly, the forest around Oyo State has been reduced to grassland. The lack of sufficient cover trees and other vegetation can cause natural change, desertification, and soil breaking down, flooding, and extended ozone exhausting substances in the environment.

=== Sea level rise and floods ===
In late August 2012, Nigeria was hit by the worst flooding ever experienced in 40 years. This affected 7 million people in communities across 33 states including kogi state. More than 2 million people out of the affected 7 million were driven from their homes by rising waters.

Nigeria experienced another flooding caused by heavy seasonal rains in 2013 which brought further misery to a population that was still recovering from the 2012 fatal floods. Many mud-brick homes collapsed and families' belongings were ruined. Dug wells which are sources of potable water were also polluted. The states of Abia, Bauchi, Benue, Jigawa, Kebbi, Kano, Kogi and Zamfara were most affected by the floodwaters which lasted for 48 hours. The situation in Kaduna and Katsina was aggravated by the collapse of earth dams. According to the National Emergency Management Agency, more than 47,000 people were affected. This lesser number of people affected is attributed to the lessons of the 2012 floods which prepared the country for a better response.

In Nigeria, areas around the coastal regions are at risk of rising sea level. For example, the Niger Delta area is extremely vulnerable to flooding at a risk of rising sea level and a victim of extreme oil pollution. Climate change was the reason behind the flood that took place in Southern Nigeria in 2012. The flood was responsible for the loss of houses, farms, farm produce, properties and lives. According to the statistics released in 2014 by National Emergency Management Agency (NEMA), about 5,000 houses and 60 homes were affected in a windstorm that occurred in four states in the South-West region.

== Impacts to Nigeria and its economy ==
The country is likely to experience exacerbate floods, droughts, heat waves and hamper agricultural production in hotter and drier seasons.

=== Health ===
NIMET has predicted an increased incidence of malaria due to climate change, and other diseases that will be higher in areas with temperatures ranging between 18 and 32 °C and with relative humidity above 60 percent.

=== Economic ===
==== Agriculture ====
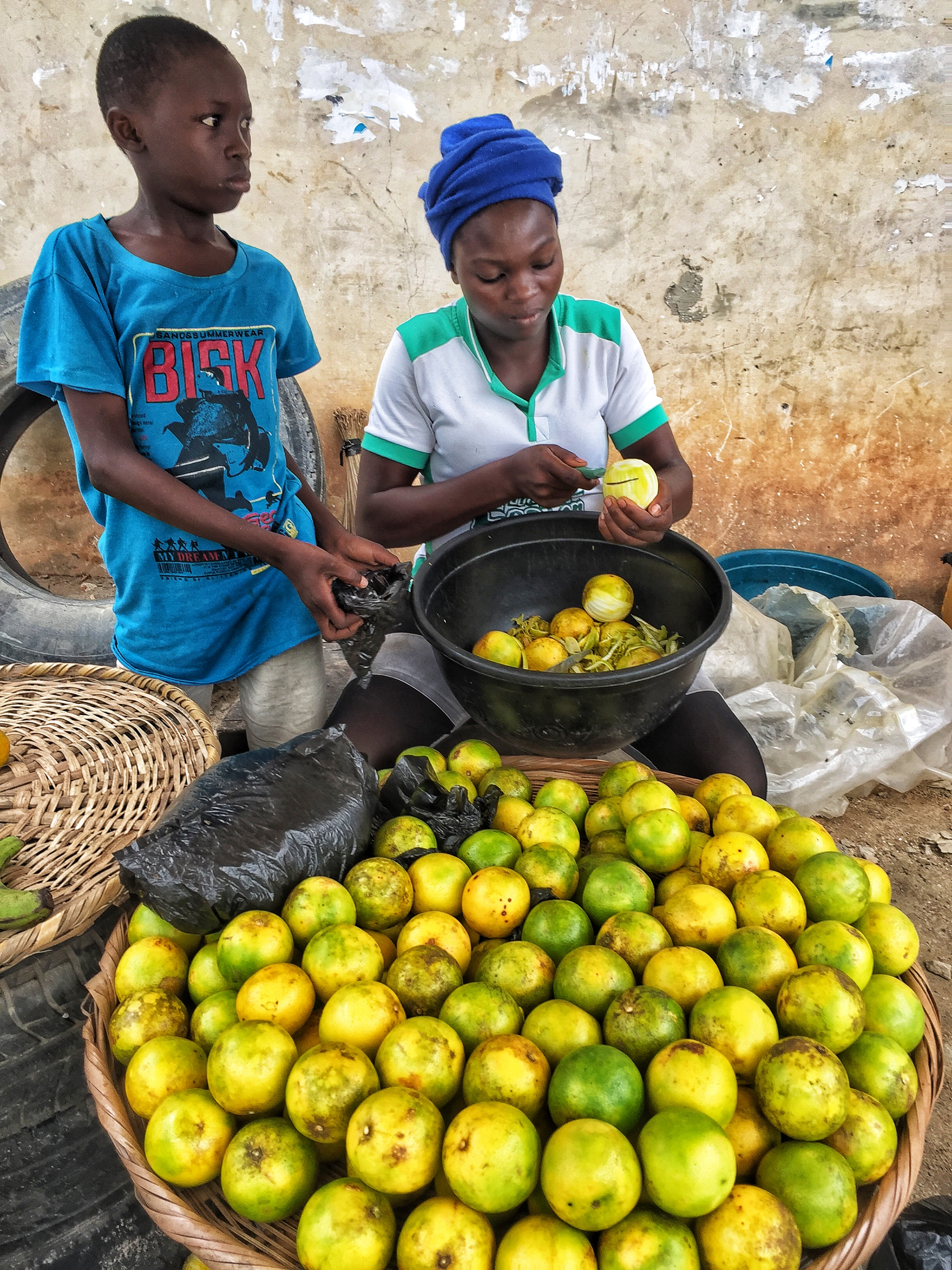
Agriculture is one of the sectors affected by climate change in Nigeria (street vendor in Lagos).

Climate change is exerting a profound and multifaceted impact on agriculture in Nigeria, with discernible shifts in weather patterns, an increase in both the frequency and intensity of droughts and floods, and unsettling temperature variations. Agriculture remains the mainstay of the Nigerian economy in spite of oil as it employs two-thirds of the entire working population. The sector is fraught with challenges as agricultural production is still mainly rainfall and subject to weather vagaries. Farmers find it hard to plan their operations due to unpredictable rainfall vagaries. Increase in the total amount of rainfall and extreme temperature would have more of a negative effect on staple crops productivity. However, in northern states such as Borno, Yobe, Kaduna, Kano and Sokoto most crops might benefit economically. Crops such as millet, melon, sugarcane that are grown in the north will most likely benefit from extreme temperature.

The sector is also plagued with:

- an outdated land tenure system that limits access to land (1.8 hectares or 4.4 acres per farming household)
- reduced irrigation development capacity (cropped land under irrigation less than one percent)
- lack of access to other agricultural improvements and support indicated by low adoption of technologies, limited access to fertilizers, inadequate storage facilities and limited market access.
- financial restrictions of limited access to credits; expensive farm inputs

All of these combined, have reduced agricultural productivity to, for example, average cereal production of 1.2 metric tons per hectare [0.48 long ton/acre; 0.54 short ton/acre]). This is coupled with high postharvest losses and wastage.

Urgent adaptation and mitigation measures are imperative to safeguard Nigeria's agricultural sector and ensure food security in the face of an ever-changing climate.

=== Agriculture and Food Security ===
Nigeria's economy is heavily dependent on agriculture, which is particularly vulnerable to the impacts of climate change. The majority of the population relies on subsistence farming, growing crops such as maize, cassava, yams, and millet, and raising livestock. However, the changing climate poses multiple challenges for farmers.

Longer dry spells in the northern regions and unpredictable rainy seasons in the south threaten agricultural productivity. Farmers who depend on predictable rainfall for irrigation now find it increasingly difficult to plan for the future. This can lead to crop failures, increased poverty, and food shortages, especially in rural areas.

In addition to changing rainfall patterns, increasing temperatures are also harming soil quality, reducing the land's fertility. Higher temperatures combined with droughts create conditions that make it harder for crops to thrive, leaving farmers with fewer resources to sustain their livelihoods. As a result, food insecurity is becoming a growing issue, further exacerbating poverty levels in rural communities.

Droughts and desertification have had significant impacts on northern Nigerian communities that rely on rain-fed farming. As water and fertile land become scarcer, nomadic herders are moving south in search of better grazing areas. This migration has led to conflicts with local farmers over limited resources. Additionally, the nomadic cattle herders can bring zoonotic diseases, and climate change may make these health risks even worse.

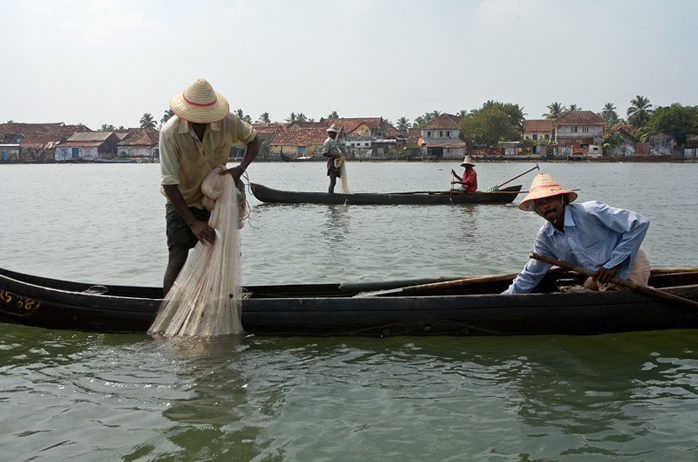
Fishermen

==== Fisheries ====
The fishery sub-sector in Nigeria contributes about 3–4 percent to the country's annual GDP. It is also a key contributor to the nutritional requirements of the population as it constitutes about 50 percent of animal protein intake. The sector also provides income and employment for a substantial number of small traders and artisanal fishermen. Over the past few years, capture fisheries have been declining and despite high potential Nigeria has in both fresh water and marine fisheries, domestic fish production still falls short of total demand. This has led to a high dependence on imports. To reduce importation dependence, aquaculture has been made one of the priority value chains targeted for development by the government. Climate change affects the characteristics and nature of water resources due to rising sea levels and extreme weather events. Increased salinity and shrinking lakes and rivers are also threats to the viability of inland fisheries.

==== Forestry ====
Nigeria is endowed with variety of forest resources, from savannas in the north to rainforests in the south, and diverse species which fulfill a number of environmental functions. These include wildlife, medicinal plants and herbs, watershed protection, hydrological regime stabilization and carbon sequestration. Forests regulate global climate and serve as a major agent of carbon exchange in the atmosphere. In Nigeria, natural forests have reduced drastically and its impacts on climate change are increasing. Erosion and excessive wind reduces the amount of forestry produce, such as wood and cane. Forests are under significant pressure not only from climate change but also from increasing populations and greater demand for forest resources.

The excessive exploitation of these forest resources is a source of concern as it is a threat to the economic, environmental and social wellbeing of Nigerians. Apart from providing a significant proportion of global timber and fuel.

In Nigeria, forestry is important to both the economy and attempts to preserve the environment.

Nigeria's woods may be generally divided into three different kinds based on their distribution and characteristics:

1. Rainforests: Located in the southern region of the country, these forests are characterized by high rainfall, dense vegetation, and a wide variety of tree species. They include the freshwater swamp forest and the tropical lowland rainforest.
2. Guinea savanna woodland: These savannas are found in the center of Nigeria and are distinguished by a mixture of trees and grasses. They serve as a transitional area between the southern rainforests.

== Strengthening defences ==
To address the situation, Nigeria initiated the Nigeria Erosion and Watershed Management Project (NEWMAP) in 2012. This project embraced progressive integrated methods centered around active community involvement. By its completion in 2022, NEWMAP successfully connected poverty reduction efforts with sustainable ecosystems and enhanced disaster-risk prevention. This comprehensive strategy has had a positive impact on the well-being and safety of over 12 million individuals across 23 states in Nigeria.

NEWMAP implemented various mechanisms to safeguard Nigerians from the potential impacts of future climate change. The project restored dozens of gully sites and built nearly 60 catchments to effectively control erosion. To enhance preparedness, warning and monitoring systems were put in place. Stormwater diversion plans were devised, and solid waste management was improved to reduce the likelihood of flooding during heavy rainfall events. These efforts aimed at fortifying the nation against the adverse effects of climate change and enhancing resilience in the face of environmental challenges.

In order to assist farmers in managing droughts effectively, climate-smart agricultural innovations have been introduced, focusing on water conservation. These innovations include the widespread implementation of solar-powered drip irrigation systems and rainwater harvesting techniques. These measures aim to optimize water usage, allowing farmers to adapt to challenging climate conditions and ensure more sustainable agricultural practices during periods of water scarcity.

=== Climate adaptation or mitigation ===
Climate Carbon mitigation is an issue for the world's economies as they work to combat climate change and advance environmental and socioeconomic sustainability. However, for most of African countries, including Nigeria, the carbon footprint is low yet the effects of the climate crises is in the country is huge. The world's economy cannot abruptly quit using fossil fuels, since that would mean the end of the current way of life. Without the fossil fuel economy, materials for computers or smartphones, or the ability for online communications would end. Fossil fuels are necessary for all aspects of modern living, including food, clothing, shelter, water, entertainment, and others.

Adapting to the effects of the climate crises falls on the whole population, despite individuals in domestic settings not being a significant source of greenhouse gas emissions. Consequent disruptions, especially in areas like agriculture and health, cause ripple effects on human migration, gender inequality, food security and standards of living.

=== The Great Green Wall ===
The Great Green Wall project was adopted by the African Union in 2007, initially conceived as a way to combat desertification in the Sahel region and hold back expansion of the Sahara desert by planting a wall of trees stretching across the entire Sahel. The current focus of the project is to create a mosaic of green and productive landscapes across North Africa by promoting water harvesting techniques, greenery protection, and improving indigenous land use techniques. The ongoing goal of the project is to restore 100 million hectares (250 million acres) of degraded land and capture 250 million Tonnes of carbon dioxide, and create 10 million jobs in the process all by 2030.

== Policies and legislation ==
Nigeria ratified the Paris Agreement, an international deal aimed at tackling climate change, in 2017 and has pledged to reduce its greenhouse gas emissions by 20% by 2030 with the condition of 45% of international support. Also, in demonstration of the country's seriousness in approaching climate action, President Muhammadu Buhari signed the country's climate change bill into law in November 2021.

=== Mitigation and adaptation policy ===
To mitigate the adverse effect of climate change, not only did Nigeria sign the Paris Agreement to reduce emissions, in its national climate pledge, it also committed to attempting to eliminate gas flaring by 2030 and has devised a National Forest Policy. There have been efforts to stimulate the adoption of climate-smart agriculture and the planting of trees.

The increasing vulnerability to extreme climatic change in Nigeria is exacerbated by accelerated urbanization, which is pushing more people into capital cities and other regions. This expansion is encroaching on flood plains and coastal areas, heightening the risks of coastal floods. To address these challenges, promoting planned human settlements and intensive urban infrastructure development is crucial. Additionally, the government must implement policy interventions and allocate increased funding for climate-related projects to protect properties and lives in susceptible areas and build resilience to climate change impacts.

To enhance adaptation to climate-related disasters in Nigeria, a comprehensive and structured plan for climate change adaptation must include coastal states and flood plains. The implementation of national initiatives like the Great Green Wall and the Climate Change Act is essential to combat desertification, food shortages, and climate change impacts. Proper funding and implementation of the Nigeria Climate Change Commission are vital to provide strong institutional support for vulnerable states in the country. Prioritizing these measures will improve Nigeria's resilience and capacity to cope with climate-related challenges and foster sustainable development.

=== Nigeria Energy Transition Plan ===
In 2021 during COP 26, the then Nigerian President, President Muhammadu Buhari, unveiled the Nigerian Energy Transition Plan as part of country's commitment towards achieving NET Zero by the year 2060. The plan included a timeline and framework for achieving reduced emissions in certain sector of the country such as Oil and Gas, Cooking, Transport and Industry and Power. This is in a bid to help slow down the change in climate.

Nigeria's Energy Transition Plan (ETP) is a long-term strategy to decarbonize the country's energy sector and achieve net-zero emissions by 2060. The ETP was launched in August 2022 and is based on a data-driven approach that identifies the most cost-effective pathways to decarbonization.

The ETP key sector:

- Power: The ETP aims to increase the share of renewable energy in the power sector to 30% by 2030 and 60% by 2060. This will be achieved through the deployment of solar, wind, and hydro power projects, as well as the development of a national grid.
- Cooking: The ETP aims to transition to clean cooking fuels by 2030. This will be achieved through the promotion of solar-powered cooking stoves and the development of a national gas grid.
- Industry: The ETP aims to decarbonize the industrial sector by 2060. This will be achieved through the adoption of energy-efficient technologies and the use of renewable energy sources.
- Transportation: The ETP aims to electrify the transportation sector by 2060. This will be achieved through the deployment of electric vehicles and the development of a national charging infrastructure.

The Nigeria ETP is a comprehensive and ambitious plan that has the potential to transform the country's energy sector. The plan in its efforts to address climate; change and achieve sustainable development. Commentary about the plan by the Africa Policy Research Institute argues that the energy transition lives alongside multiple other significant transitions, including demographics, political, and digital, that make the fossil fuel phaseout politically challenging.

The plan aims to achieve net-zero emissions by 2060. In the policy framework of the document, gas will be used as a transition fuel in the power and cooking sectors. The plan creates significant investment opportunities in the solar, wind, and hydrogen sectors, but multiple analysts describe a significant financing gap for the plan.

Another important sector for emissions is the from deforestation and land use practices within its Agriculture, Land use, land-use change, and forestry (AFOLU) sector, which are as substantial as those from the oil and gas industry and account for about 30% of the country's total emissions. Commentators emphasize that the government, while emphasizing the transition to renewable energy, must also implement transformative policies in the AFOLU sector, including reforestation initiatives, broadening access to clean electricity, and socioeconomic reforms aimed at job creation and poverty reduction, to address the intertwined challenges of climate change, economic growth, and social equity.

=== International cooperation ===
The UNDP is committed to supporting Nigeria and a UNDP-NDC Support Programme is already fully in motion. One of their goals is having increased engagement with the government and private sector.

== Public perception ==
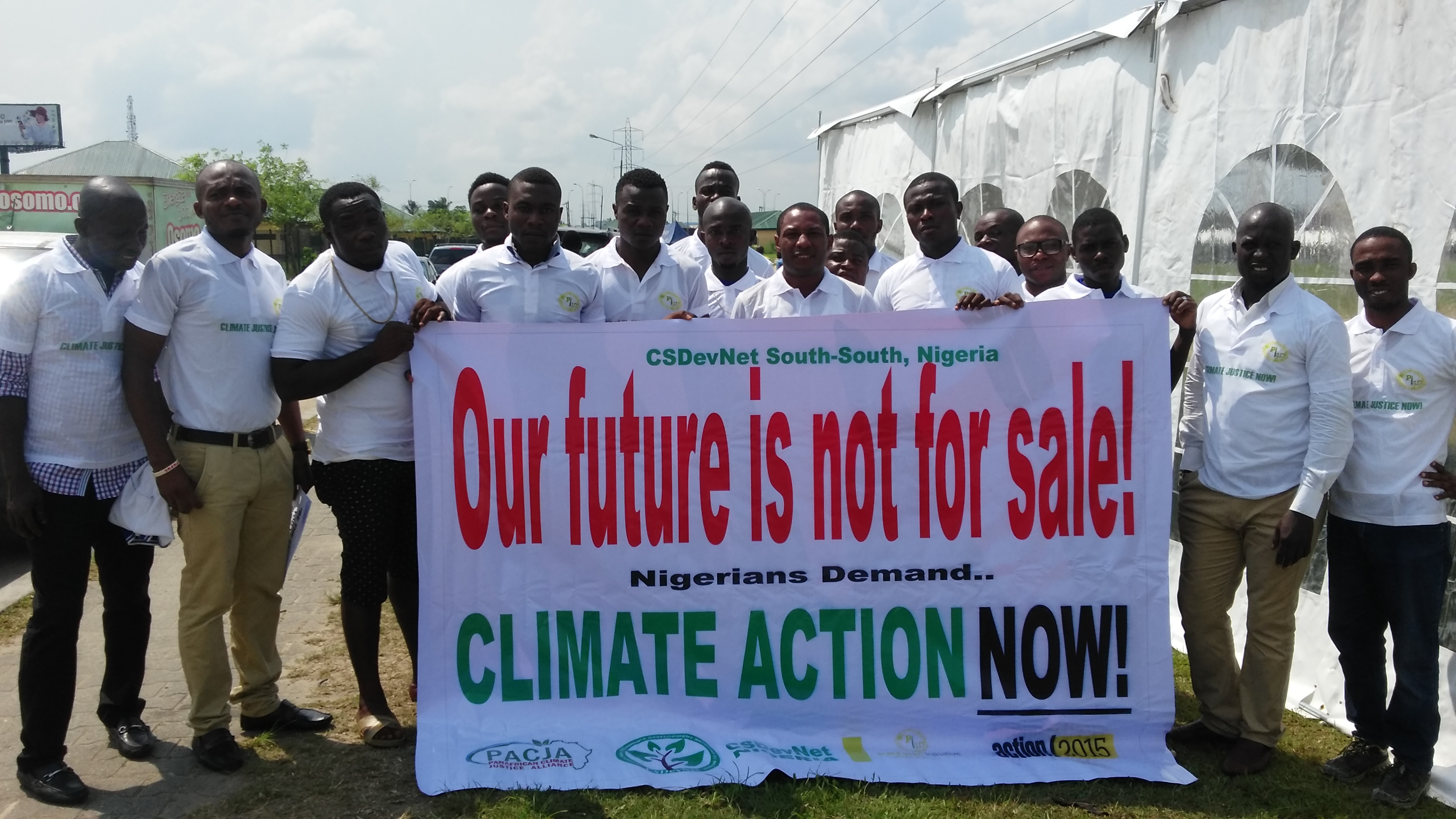
Protesters in Port Harcourt joining the Global Climate March in the lead-up to the 2015 United Nations Climate Change Conference

A study of students at University of Jos, found that 59.7% of respondents had good knowledge about climate change, and understood its connection to issues like fossil fuel, pollution, deforestation and urbanization.

A survey of 1019 people in rural communities in southwestern Nigeria found respondents had good knowledge about the effects but poor knowledge about the causes of climate change, with many attributing supernatural causes to climate change. Some of the challenges with the non-specialist communities include lack of contextual information about climate change, language communication barrier in the local language.

== See also ==
- Agriculture in Nigeria
- Drought in Nigeria
- Environmental, social, and corporate governance
- Geography of Nigeria
- Sustainable Development Goals and Nigeria
- Climate of Nigeria
