= Mohammed Hassan Abdullahi =

Nigerian lawyer and politician (born 1968)

Barrister Mohammed Hassan Abdullahi
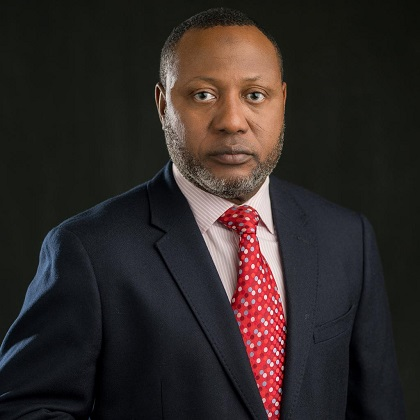
- Mohammed in 2020

Minister of Environment
- In office 6 April 2022 – 29 May 2023
- President: Muhammadu Buhari
- Preceded by: Mohammad Mahmood Abubakar
- Succeeded by: Balarabe Abbas Lawal

Personal details
- Born: 21 April 1968 (age 58) Uke, Karu, Benue-Plateau State (now in Nasarawa State), Nigeria
- Citizenship: Nigeria
- Education: Usmanu Danfodiyo University; Nigerian Law School
- Occupation: Politician; lawyer

Mohammed Hassan Abdullahi (born 21 April 1968) is a Nigerian lawyer and politician. He was appointed Nigeria's Minister of Environment by President Muhammadu Buhari in April 2022, having been redeployed from the Ministry of Science and Technology where he was Minister of State. He served in his new position until May 2023. He was Attorney General and Commissioner for Justice for Nasarawa State and the Secretary to the State Government (SSG). He is a solicitor and advocate of the Supreme Court of Nigeria.

== Early life and education ==
Mohammed Hassan Abdullahi was born in Uke, in present-day Karu local government area of Nasarawa state. He attended Central Primary School Uke from 1973 to 1979 where he obtained his first school leaving certificate. Between 1979 and 1984, he studied at Government Secondary School, Uke, where he received his West African School Certificate and General Certificate of Education. In 1990, he received a Combined Honours Bachelor of Laws in Common/Sharia Law from Usmanu Danfodiyo University, Sokoto, and was called to the Nigerian Bar in 1991 after graduating from the Nigerian Law School, Lagos. He served in the compulsory National Youth Service Corps (NYSC) in Enugu State, under Mssrs Ukpabi, Ukpabi & Co. (Legal Practitioners).

== Career ==
In 1993, Abdullahi began his career as a lawyer with Messrs Ola Olanipekun & Co. (Prime Chambers), as an Associate Attorney. He is Founding Partner Tafida Chambers (Messrs Hammart & CO. Solicitors/Advocates), Abuja. Between 2006 and 2011 he was vice president, Administrative and Regulatory, Intercell Tech. Limited; and company secretary/Legal Adviser of Transnational Corporation of Nigeria, Lagos. Between 2000 and 2002, he served as Deputy general manager/company secretary, Nasarawa Investment & Property Development Company, after serving as chairman, Karu local government in 1996.

He was appointed into the Nasarawa State Executive Council by Governor Abdullahi Adamu, and served as Attorney General and Commissioner for Justice and Special Adviser from 2003 to 2005. He is described as a bedrock of principles and a moral compass.

He was appointed Secretary to the State Government of Nasarawa by Governor Umaru Tanko Al-Makura and served from 2017 to 2019 before his appointment into the Federal Executive council by President Muhammadu Buhari.

During his ministerial screening at the Senate, there were appeals from some senators for him to enjoy the privilege reserved for former lawmakers to 'take a bow'; with little or no scrutiny. Their appeals were based on his previous exploits in state governance. He however answered a few questions on women empowerment and security.

After his successful screening, he was assigned by President Muhammadu Buhari to serve in his cabinet as Minister for State, Science and Technology. In April 2022, he was appointed by the president as the Minister of Environment.

== Membership ==
- Nigerian Bar Association
- International Bar Association

== See also ==
- Cabinet of Nigeria
