= National Biosafety Management Agency =

National agency in Nigeria

- NBMA

Agency overview
- Formed: 2015
- Jurisdiction: Federal Government of Nigeria
- Headquarters: Abuja, Nigeria
- Agency executives: Director General/Chief Executive Officer; Agnes Yemisi Asagbra
- Parent department: Federal Ministry of Environment
- Website: nbma.gov.ng

The National Biosafety Management Agency (NBMA) is an agency under the Federal Ministry of Environment in Nigeria. It was instituted by the National Assembly of the Federal Republic of Nigeria and the bill was signed by the President Goodluck Jonathan into law in April, 2015. The agency was established by the National Biosafety Management Agency Act of 2015 amended in 2019 which serves as a regulatory body guiding modern biotechnology activities in Nigeria to ensure the safeguarding of lives and the environment from the adverse effect of biotechnology activities in Nigeria.

== Objectives of the Agency ==
- Provides and ensures biosecurity protocols guiding biotechnology activities in the country.
- Provision of access to safe, ethical and good use of biotechnological products.
- Ensuring sustenance of acceptance and profitable biotechnology technology to support innovation.
- Promote global competition and export of homemade biotechnology products
- Development of legislations in tandem with international regulations to ensure the safety of biotechnology activities in the country.

== Structure of the Agency ==
The National Biosafety Management Agency is presently made up of six major departments;

1. Administration and Finance
2. Planning, Research and Statistics
3. Biosecurity
4. Environmental Biosafety and General Release Department
5. Biosafety Enforcement and Operations Department
6. Socio-Economic and Food Safety Department

== Achievements of the Agency ==
As parts of its mandate to sensitize the public on the safety of biotechnology activities, the agency in recent past visited the law enforcements agencies to carry out sensitization program on the enforcement and regulation of genetically modified products in the country. The agency also carries out training of personnel that will manage its laboratory to ensure international standards. Also, the agency host its annual conference where it does not fail to enlighten the public and the government on the safety of biotechnology products and also the importance of attaching safety measures while carrying out biotechnological researches. As part of its plan to improve standard practices in biotechnology in Nigeria, the agency has begun the drafting of regulations guiding genome editing in Nigeria.
