= Saleh Abubakar =

Nigerian Public Servant

Saleh Abubakar (born November 27, 1958) is a Nigerian civil servant and administrator. He is the current Director-General of the National Agency for the Great Green Wall (NAGGW), appointed in July 2024 by President Bola Tinubu. He previously served as the Head of the Civil Service of Yobe State and has held various administrative roles in the Yobe State Government.

== Early life and education ==
Saleh Abubakar was born in Gashu'a, Bade Local Government Area, Yobe State, Nigeria. He attended Central Primary School, Gashu'a (1965–1972) and later studied at General Murtala Mohammed College (GMMC), Yola (1972–1976). He completed a pre-degree program at the School of Basic Studies, Zaria (1977–1978) before earning a Bachelor of Science (B.Sc.) in Political Science from Ahmadu Bello University, Zaria in 1982.

== Career ==
=== Early career ===
Abubakar began his career in the Borno State Civil Service in 1983. In 1984, he joined the Ministry of External Affairs (now the Ministry of Foreign Affairs). He returned to the Borno State Civil Service in 1989 as an Administrative Officer.

=== Yobe State Civil Service ===
Following the creation of Yobe State in 1991, Abubakar was appointed Director of Political Affairs in the Governor’s Office. He later served as:

- Director of Administration, Governor’s Office (1995)
- Deputy Permanent Secretary, Administration (1999)
- Deputy Permanent Secretary, Ministry of Land and Survey (2004)
- Deputy Permanent Secretary, Administration, Governor’s Office (2006)
- Permanent Secretary/Chief of Staff to the Governor (2007–2017)

=== Head of Civil Service (Yobe State) ===
On April 4, 2017, Abubakar was appointed as the Head of the Civil Service of Yobe State by Governor Ibrahim Gaidam. He succeeded Alhaji Dauda Yahaya, who retired from the position.

=== Director-General of the National Agency for the Great Green Wall ===
In July 2024, President Bola Tinubu appointed Abubakar as the Director-General of the National Agency for the Great Green Wall (NAGGW). The agency is responsible for implementing Nigeria’s initiatives to combat desertification and promote sustainable land management.

== Awards ==
Member of the Order of the Federal Republic (MFR) – 2022
