= Drought in Nigeria =

Climate changes in Nigeria

Long-term drought in Nigeria has resulted in desertification and a shortage of land for raising cattle and growing crops. To acquire land for farming or grazing, farmers and herdsmen are encouraged to go to new areas, which frequently leads to violence. Herders and farmers have been engaged in increasingly violent fights over the previous two years. More than 2,000 people lost their lives in 2018. However, many residents of the Villages in Nigeria's Plateau State are unwilling to relocate because it is their home. When a community is burned down, new bricks are created to repair the destroyed homes.

Drought is a phenomenon that occurs in Nigeria and impacts the whole nation. The arid and semi-arid regions are more sensitive than the dryer south, but the degree of vulnerability varies. In Northern Nigeria, drought resulted in famines in the years 1914, 1924, 1935, 1943, 1951–1954, 1972–1973.

A recent survey conducted in seven states of Nigeria by SBMIntel, an Africa-focused research firm, showed that approximately 79% of Nigerian farmers were impacted by the damaging effects of drought and flooding in 2020. Among them, 26.3% experienced significant disruptions to their harvests due to extreme weather conditions. About 52.60% were somewhat affected, while 21.1% reported no impact from the drought and flooding. The survey, titled "Nigerians just want to eat," highlights the major challenges faced by Nigerian farmers and food transporters, which could potentially hinder national food security. It was published this month.

== Effects ==
Drought has led to an increase in global climate change which affects the growth of crops and livestock and the demand for sustainable development.

Drought has also led to deadly land grabs. In the past few years there have been a growing number of skirmishes between farmers and cattle herders searching for pasture and water.

The significant impact of drought in Northern Nigeria has been evident over the past years, affecting crops and farmers' produce in the region. Drought is characterized by prolonged absence or insufficient distribution of precipitation, resulting in a long-term deficiency of rainfall in a specific area. This situation leads to water stress and widespread crop failure when the rain fails to meet the evapo-transpiration demands of the crops.

Experts have labeled the 2022 floods in Nigeria as the most severe since 2012. These floods have devastated crops on more than 500,000 hectares of farmlands, affecting numerous smallholder and commercial farmers throughout the country.

Climate change affects Nigeria's hydro power generation, as it leads to unpredictable rainfall and drought patterns, impacting water levels in dams like Kainji Dam. During drought, the hydro power output decreases, affecting national power distribution and disrupting industrial activities that rely on a stable power supply. Conversely, excessive rainfall due to climate change can result in severe flooding in neighboring communities.

== Causes ==
=== Climatic Causes ===
- Low Rainfall: Part of the Sahel region, experiences highly variable and often below average rainfall, which Is a primary driver of drought
- High Temperature: Rising temperatures due to global climate change increase evaporation, drying out soil and water sources
- Changing wind and pressure patterns: Disruptions in the West African Monsoon can reduce seasonal rains.

==== Human Causes ====
- Deforestation: Clearing forests for agriculture reduces the land’s ability to retain water, exacerbating dryness.
- Overgrazing: Large herds of livestock remove vegetation cover, leading to soil degradation and desertification.
- Poor water management: Inefficient irrigation, dam management, and lack of water storage increase vulnerability during dry periods.
- Urban expansion and land use change: Growing cities and farmland reduce natural vegetation and water infiltration.

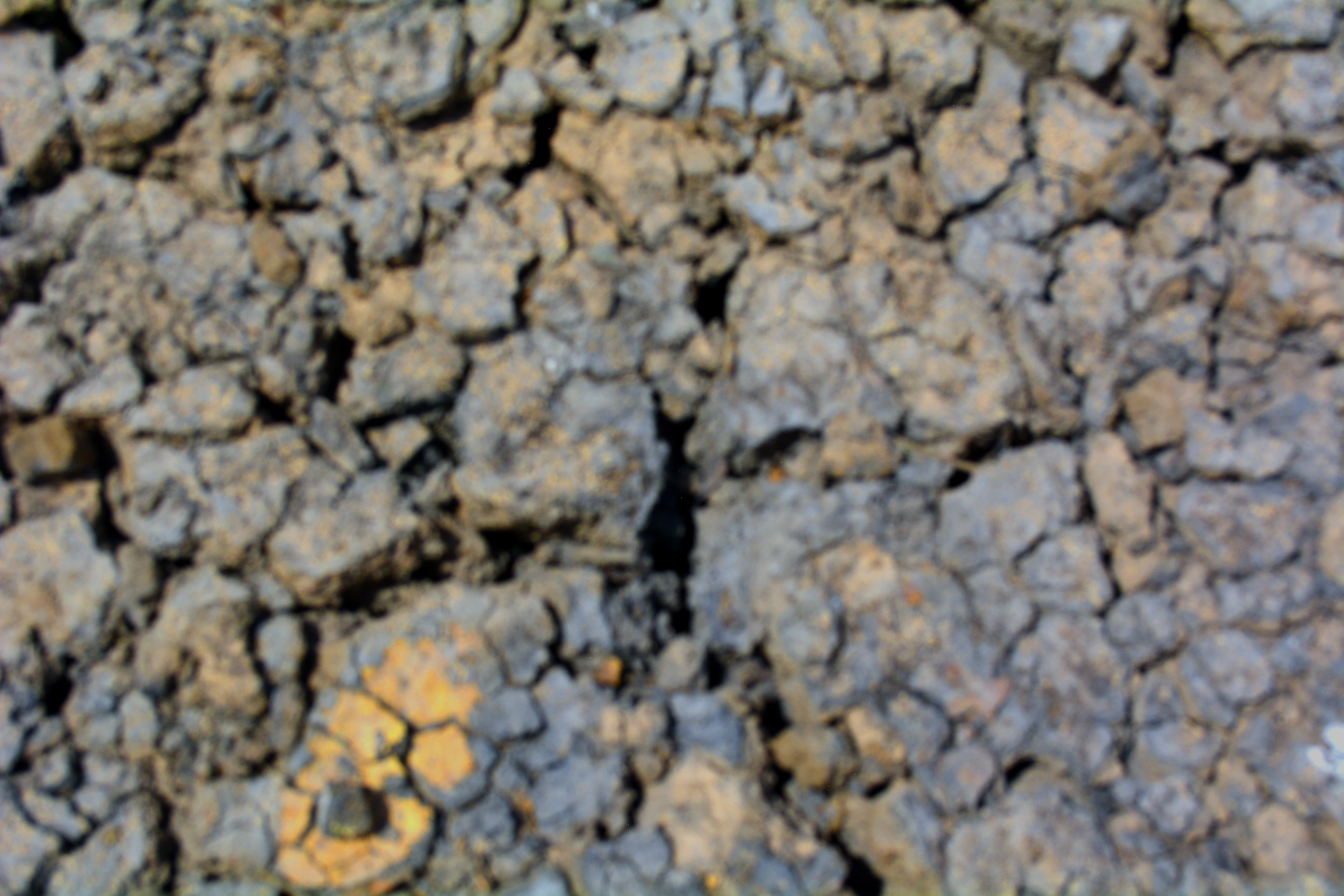
rasuwa

The combination of climatic variability and human activities accelerates desertification, particularly in Northern Nigeria. Drought is often compounded by soil degradation, which further limits agricultural productivity and water availability.

== States Affected by Droughts ==
The following states includes; Sokoto, Katsina, Zamfara, Kebbi, Jigawa and Kano in the north-west and Borno, Yobe, Gombe, Bauchi and Adamawa States in the north-eastern part of the country are mainly affected by droughts.

Other states that are being affected of recent are Kwara, Niger etc.

== Climate ==
The Harmattan season which occurs between the end of November and the middle of March brings about drought in Nigeria. It sometimes creates big clouds of dust which can result in dust storms or sandstorms. The wind can increase fire risk and cause severe crop damage.

== Government agency ==
The National Environmental (Desertification Control and Drought Mitigation) Regulations, 2011 play roles in the regulation of desertification in Nigeria. They also play important roles in sensitizing Nigerians about the causes and dangers of Desertification. They achieve this by encouraging reforestation, reseeding, afforestation and conservation of areas under desertification.
