= Balarabe Abbas Lawal =

Nigerian politician (born 1958)

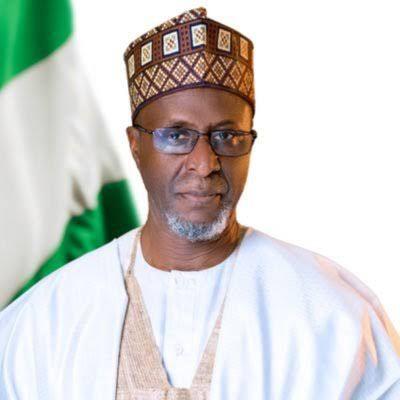
- Official Portrait

Minister of Environment
- Incumbent
- Assumed office 9 October 2023
- President: Bola Tinubu
- Preceded by: Mohammed Hassan Abdullahi

Personal details
- Born: 5 February 1958 (age 68) Zaria, Northern Region, Nigeria
- Party: All Progressives Congress
- Education: Master's Degree
- Alma mater: Ahmadu Bello University
- Occupation: Politician; Public servant
- Cabinet: Bola Tinubu

Balarabe Abbas Lawal (born 5 February 1958) is a Nigerian public servant and politician who is the current Minister of Environment of Nigeria.

== Education ==
Lawal attended Barewa College for his secondary education. He later earned a bachelor’s degree and a master’s degree in political science from Ahmadu Bello University, Zaria.

== Career ==
Lawal served as Secretary to the Kaduna State Government under Governor Uba Sani from 30 May 2023 until his appointment as Minister of Environment in October 2023. He previously held the same position under Governor Nasir El-Rufai from May 2015 to May 2023.

He also served as Chief of Staff to El-Rufai during his tenure as minister of the Federal Capital Territory from July 2003 to July 2007. From September 1999 to February 2001, Lawal was Special Assistant to the Minister of State for Education. Between February 2001 and May 2003, he also served as Special Assistant to the Minister of State for Defence for the Nigerian Army.
