= Nigeria Erosion and Watershed Management Project =

Project addressing climate-related environmental issues in Nigeria

Agency overview
- Formed: 2010
- Type: Government environmental agency
- Headquarters: Abuja
- Agency executive: Balarabe Abbas Lawal

Nigeria Erosion and Watershed Management Project (NEWMAP) is a World Bank assisted project aimed at addressing the Nigerian gully erosion crisis in Southeastern Nigeria and land degradation in Northern Nigeria on a multi-dimensional scale. This project was born out of the request for assistance made by President Goodluck Ebele Jonathan to World Bank in 2010. He requested for assistance in tackling severe gully erosion in Southern Nigeria, land degradation in Northern Nigeria and environmental insecurity. The project is being monitored by the Federal Ministry of Environment. Some aspects of the project includes erosion and watershed management infrastructure investments, erosion and watershed management institutions and information services and climate change response.

== Background ==
The board approved the project on May 8, 2012. It commenced operation on September 16, 2013, with the appointment of Amos Abu, Ruth Jane Kennedy-Walker, and Grant Milne as team leaders, the Federal Ministry of Environment as the implementing agency, and a total project cost of US$650 million and committed amount of World Bank of US$500 million. It is an 8-year project, expected to end on June 30, 2020.

The project commenced full operation in 2013 with seven pilot states, namely Abia, Anambra, Cross River, Ebonyi, Edo, Enugu and Imo State which suffered threats by gully erosion to infrastructure and livelihood. In 2015, the project scaled to meet the environmental needs of twelve more States, namely Delta, Oyo, Sokoto, Gombe, Plateau, Kogi, Kano, Akwa Ibom, Borno, Nasarrawa, Katsina and Niger states.

== Achievements ==
Some achievements of the project since its inception in 2010 includes;

- Giving grants to individuals that have been affected with erosion and land degradation activities in states under its jurisdiction to embark on other activities and also support their resettlement in new locations.
- The project has also led to the installation of Meteorological stations, hydrological stations, automated flood early warning equipment across places that are on the bank of the rivers.
- Creation of the special climate fund that is targeted at controlling gully erosion, flood and land risk and also rainfall issues that can lead to environmental issues.
- Creation of gully catchment in different states in the area with high erosion and flooding issues in Nigeria.
- Development of Nigeria Innovative Green bonds which seeks to fund projects that are related to environmental and climate issues in Nigeria.
- Providing support for climate related environmental issues in Nigeria.
