= Ogbaru boat disaster =

2022 disaster in Anambra State, Nigeria

- Date: 7 October 2022
- Time: 11:00–12:00 (WAT, UTC+01:00)
- Location: Umunankwo, Ogbaru, Anambra State, Nigeria; 5°55′N 6°42′E
- Type: Capsized boat
- Deaths: 76

Disaster location

The Ogbaru boat disaster, also called the Ogbaru boat mishap or Anambra boat mishap, was the accidental sinking of a boat on the Niger River in Nigeria on 7 October 2022, causing 76 deaths. It took place during the 2022 Nigeria floods.

== Background ==
Boat accidents are common in Nigeria; in 2021 there were major incidents in Kebbi State (killing 98) and in Kano State (killing 29). 2022 has seen severe floods in the country, exacerbated by climate change. According to Agence France Presse, "Boat accidents are common in Nigeria because of overloading, speeding, poor maintenance and disregard of traffic rules."

== Accident ==
The boat, designed for a complement of 50 people, was carrying 85 passengers fleeing the floods in the region, which had reached roof level. The captain was inexperienced, and the engine broke down. The boat struck the submerged Osamala bridge and capsized. 9 of the passengers survived, while 76 drowned.

Early reports claimed that 30 people had been rescued and only about 8 lost, but President Muhammadu Buhari confirmed the death toll at 76.

== Reactions ==
Minister of Labour and Employment, Chris Ngige described the Ogbaru boat mishap as a "disaster of monumental proportions."

President Buhari reportedly "directed the relevant agencies to check the safety protocols on the vessels plying the waters to ensure their river-worthiness." He acknowledged the efforts of the Nigerian Inland Waterways Authority (NIWA) and the National Emergency Management Agency (NEMA), and offered prayers for the dead.
