= Nigerian refugees in Niger =

Refugees in Niger

Nigerian refugees in Niger are people from Nigeria but taking refuge in Niger. This is predominantly as a result of the Boko haram insurgency in North-Eastern Nigeria. As of July 2016, there are 280,000 refugees in Diffa region of Niger and approximately 6,000 and 10,000 displaced persons in refugee camp of Sayam Forage and Kabelawa respectively.

According to a report by the National Emergency Management Agency, there 138,321 refugees in Niger.
