= Zubaida Umar =

Nigerian government official

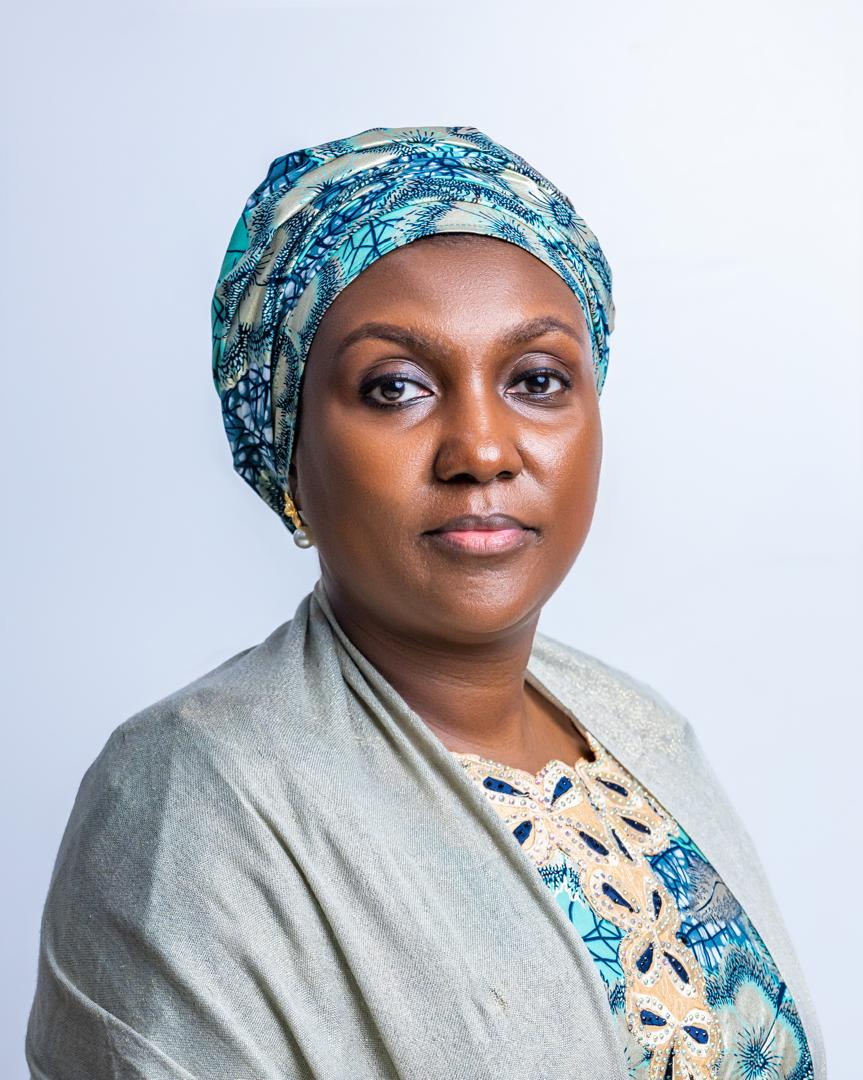

Director General of the National Emergency Management Agency
- Incumbent
- Assumed office March 15, 2024
- President: Bola Tinubu

Personal details
- Born: May 21, 1977 (age 49)
- Education: Ahmadu Bello University; Robert Gordon University
- Occupation: Public Servant, Administrator

Zubaida Umar Abubakar (born 21 May 1977) is a Nigerian public servant, administrator, and Director General of the National Emergency Management Agency (NEMA), appointed on March 15, 2024, by President Bola Ahmed Tinubu. She is a native of Birnin Kebbi in Kebbi State in the Northern part of Nigeria.

== Early life and education ==
Zubaida Umar Abubakar was born in Nigeria on 21 May 1977.

Zubaida attended Essence International Secondary School in Kaduna before studying Business Administration at Ahmadu Bello University, Zaria. She later earned a master's degree in International Trade from Robert Gordon University Business School in Scotland. Umar is also a member of the Chartered Institute of Bankers of Nigeria (CIBN), the Association of National Accountants of Nigeria (ANAN), and the Institute of Credit Administration (ICA).

== Career ==
Zubaida Umar began her career at Nigeria's Debt Management Office, where she served from 2000 to 2006. In 2006, she entered the mortgage industry with her employment at the Federal Mortgage Bank of Nigeria (FMBN). Over her tenure at FMBN, she held multiple strategic positions, rising from Senior Manager in the Managing Director's office to executive director, Finance and Corporate Services.

Her roles included Deputy General Manager for Organizational Resourcing (2009–2011), Deputy General Manager for Policy and Strategy (2011–2013), Zonal Coordinator for the FCT, Kogi, and Niger States (2013–2016), Group Head of Corporate Communications (2018–2020), and General Manager for the FCT Zone (2020–2022). In April 2022, she was appointed executive director of Finance and Corporate Services, a position she held until she was appointed NEMA's Director General in 2024.

== Personal life ==
Zubaida Umar is the daughter of Col. Dangiwa Umar, a retired military officer and former Governor of Kaduna State, renowned for his advocacy for justice and democracy. Her maternal grandfather, Mallam Yahaya Gusau, was a prominent Northern leader who significantly contributed to education and community development. He was one of Nigeria's pioneer civil servants post-independence, rising to the position of Permanent Secretary before serving as the Minister of Economic Development and Reconstruction during General Yakubu Gowon's administration.

Her paternal grandfather, the late Umar Waziri Gwandu, was a former Education Commissioner of the Old Sokoto State. The Federal Polytechnic Birnin Kebbi is named in his honour.

Zubaida is married to Kashim Tumsah, a lawyer, diplomat, businessman, and recipient of Nigeria's national honour, Member of the Order of the Federal Republic (MFR).
