= 2012 Nigeria floods =

2012 disaster in Nigeria

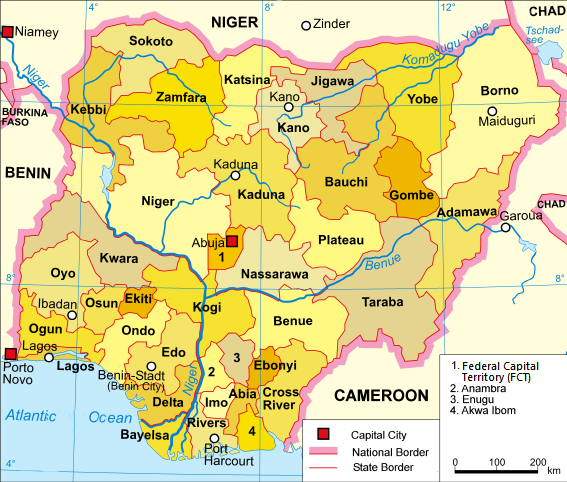
- Nigeria
- Date: July – October 2012
- Location: Adamawa, Taraba, Plateau, and Benue States were worst affected.
- Deaths: 363 people killed, over 2,100,000 displaced.

The 2012 Nigeria floods began in early July 2012. It killed 363 people and displaced over 2.1 million people as of 5 November 2012. According to the National Emergency Management Agency (NEMA), 30 of Nigeria's 36 states were affected by the floods and the two most affected areas were Kogi and Benue States. The floods were termed as the worst in 40 years, and affected an estimated total of seven million people. The estimated damages and losses caused by the floods was N2.6 trillion.

== Causes ==
Nigeria suffers from seasonal flash floods during its annual rainy season. They are sometimes lethal, especially in the rural areas and overcrowded slums, where drainage is poor or does not exist at all.

== July ==
On 2 July 2012, many Nigerian coastal and inland cities experienced heavy rains, and residents of Lagos were "gasping for breath" due to the flooding. In addition, there was gridlock on major roads, causing people to cancel or postpone appointments they may have had. Thousands of stranded commuters had to pay increased fares for the few bus drivers who were willing to risk travelling on the roads, and construction of work by the Nigerian government on the inner Oke-Afa Road took a "heavy toll."

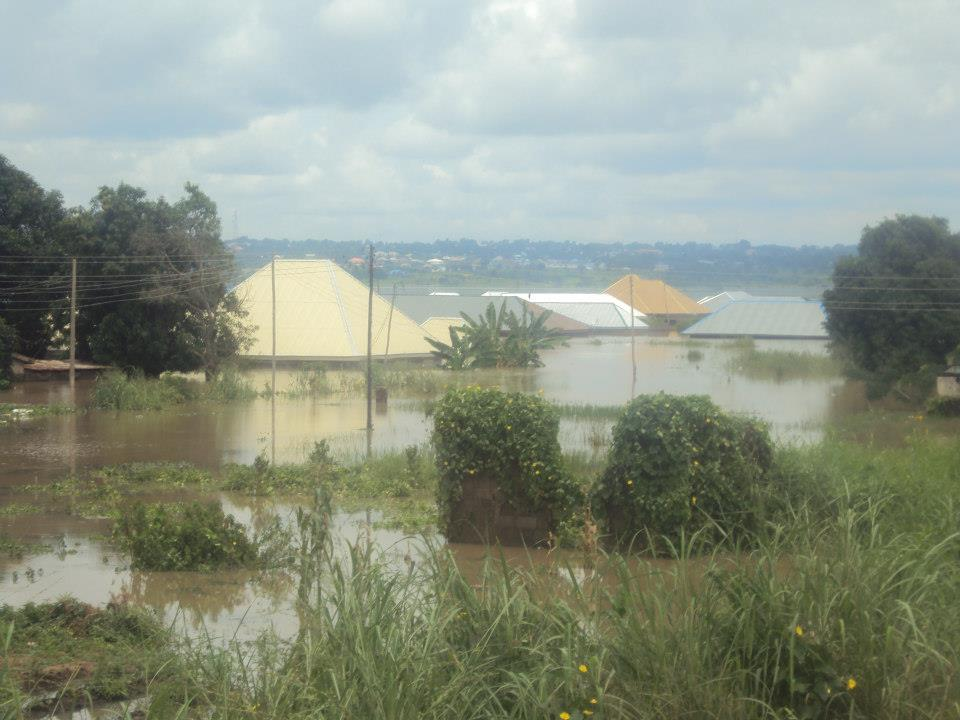
Water Submerged settlement

In mid-July 2012, flooding in the Ibadan metropolis caused some residents at Challenge, Oke-Ayo, and Eleyele to flee from their residences and save their lives. The flooding also prevented some Christians from attending churches in the morning, while a few bridges caved in. The Nigerian government said that certain structures on waterways had to be demolished as a result of the flooding, while Commissioner for Information and Orientation, Bosun Oladele, announced that there weren't any casualties from the flooding.

In late July 2012, at least 39 people were killed due to flooding in the central Nigerian Plateau State. Heavy rainfall caused the Lamingo dam to overflow near Jos, sweeping across a number of neighbourhoods in Jos, and approximately 200 homes were submerged or destroyed. In addition, at least 35 people were missing, while Manasie Phampe, the head of the Red Cross in the state, announced that relief efforts were ongoing. The floods left 3,000 people homeless, many of whom are taking refuge in government buildings in Jos.

== August ==
In mid-August, flooding killed at least 33 people in Plateau State, and co-ordinator of the National Emergency Management Agency in central Nigeria, Abdussalam Muhammad, said that homes were destroyed while roads and bridges were washed away, obstructing relief efforts. Over 12,000 people were affected by the flooding in six districts of the state, while hundreds were rendered homeless.

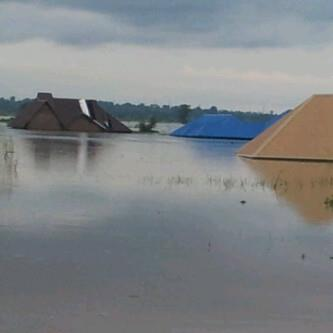
Submerged Houses in Makurdi

== September ==
Release of water from the Lagdo Reservoir in Cameroon caused the deaths of 30 people in Benue State.

In Anambra State, the flooding affected many local government areas and communities, especially those in the riverine areas that included Ayamelu, Ogbaru, Anambra West and Anambra East. It was reported that flooding displaced about 2 million people in Anambra State in 2012. The Governor, Peter Obi arranged for vehicles and boats to evacuate the community dwellers who were trapped in their homes as well as those that escaped to the tree tops to avoid being washed away. Emergency relief materials were sent to different displaced camps were flood victims were sent to.

== October ==
In early-October, the floods spread to Delta State and Bayelsa State and rendered about 120,000 people homeless, according to state authorities and the Nigerian Red Cross. Several temporary displacement sites set up were also flooded forcing people to flee. In Yenagoa, 3,000 people were sleeping at the Ovom State Sports Complex. In Delta State, among the buildings destroyed by the floods were 20 health clinics, five hospitals, many schools, churches and government buildings. Schools were either closed or occupied by internally displaced persons. The floods also spread across Benue State where a local river overflowed causing the displacement of over 25,000 people.

On 9 October, Nigerian President Goodluck Jonathan released 17.6 billion naira (US$111 million) to various states and agencies for damage response, flood relief and rehabilitation.

Lokoja Flood 2012

Kogi State was the worst affected with 623,900 people being displaced and 152,575 hectares of farmland destroyed, according to a NEMA coordinator. Jonathan called the floods "a national disaster".

== See also ==
- 2022 Nigeria floods
- List of deadliest floods
