= 2022 Nigeria floods =

Major floods in Nigeria in 2022

- Map of Nigeria
- Date: May – October 2022
- Location: Nigeria
- Cause: Heavy rains, climate change
- Deaths: 612 people killed, 1.4 million displaced
- Property damage: Over 200,000 homes completely or partially destroyed, 110,000 hectares of farmland destroyed

The 2022 Nigeria floods affected many parts of the country. From the Federal Government Data, the floods had displaced over 1.4 million people, killed over 603 people, and injured more than 2,400 people. About 82,035 houses had been damaged, and 332,327 hectares of land had also been affected.

While Nigeria typically experiences seasonal flooding, this flood was the worst in the country since the 2012 floods.

As of October, over 200,000 homes were completely or partially destroyed by the floods. On 7 October, a boat carrying people fleeing the floods capsized on the Niger River, causing 76 deaths.

The flooding was caused by heavy rainfall and climate change as well as the release of water from the Lagdo Dam in neighbouring Cameroon, which began on 13 September. Flooding, which affected Nigeria, Niger, Chad, and the surrounding region, began in the early summer of 2022 and ended in October.

== Causes ==
The Nigerian government has blamed the floods of 2022 on unusually heavy rains and climate change. United Nations Humanitarian Coordinator for Nigeria, Matthias Schmale said that the flooding could be largely explained by climate change. Climate change in Nigeria has been responsible for flooding, droughts, decreased air quality, and the loss of habitat.

A climate modeling study by the World Weather Attribution project estimated that the floods were rendered far more likely and much more intense by climate change. They modeled the June to September rainfall in the Lake Chad and lower Niger river catchment areas, looking at total rainfall and intense rain weeks.

Flooding was exacerbated on 12 September with the perennial release of water from the Lagdo Dam in neighbouring Cameroon. Excess water released from the dam cascades down River Benue and its tributaries, flooding communities in the states of Kogi, Benue as well as other states in the northeast. When Lagdo Dam was constructed in 1982, there was an agreement by Nigerian authorities to build a second, twin dam in Adamawa State to contain the overflow. Known as the Dasin Hausa Dam project, it was to be situated in Dasin Village of the Fufore local government area, but it was never built by the Nigerian government.

Nigerian Minister of Humanitarian Affairs, Disaster Management & Social Development, Sadiya Umar Farouq, said that "there was enough warning and information about the 2022 flood" she blamed local governments, states, and communities for not acting promptly despite the warnings.

The indiscriminate construction on natural flood plains and storm water paths together with poor drainage systems in many residential areas clog channels with waste. Lax enforcement of environmental laws have only exacerbated problems even further.

== Impact ==
While Nigeria regularly experiences seasonal flooding, the floods of 2022 have been the worst since the 2012 Nigeria floods. Flooding began in early summer and has affected 33 of Nigeria's 36 states.

Over two million people have been affected by the flooding. As of October, over 600 people have been killed and over 2,400 have been injured. By August there had been 372 deaths. A cholera outbreak in northeast Nigeria was attributed to the contamination of water sources by flooding and has been responsible for the deaths of at least 64 people.

The floods have completely or partially destroyed over 200,000 homes. Many Nigerians who live on flood plains cannot afford to move and simply return to their residences once water levels return to normal after the annual floods.

Flooding has also destroyed an estimated 110,000 hectares of agricultural land. Additionally, supplies of fuel have been disrupted by the floods. During the crisis, prices of food have been inflated by 23%.

According to the United Nations's Food and Agriculture Organization and World Food Programme, Nigeria faces a high risk of catastrophic hunger levels. In a briefing on 13 October, UN Humanitarian Coordinator for Nigeria Matthias Schmale indicated that 19 million people in Nigeria were food insecure and 14.7 million children were at risk of malnutrition. Some 400,000 children in the north and northeast of the country and another 500,000 in the northwestern states of Sokoto, Zamfara, and Katsina were at risk for severe acute malnutrition.

The flooding is expected to continue through November for the southern states of Anambra, Delta, Rivers, Cross River and Bayelsa. Three of Nigeria's reservoirs, Kainji, Jebba, and Shiroro, are expected to overflow.

=== Flooding by location ===
==== Adamawa state ====
In late August, severe flooding in Adamawa State caused 10 fatalities and damaged dozens of homes.

==== Anambra state ====
On 7 October 2022, 76 people drowned after an overloaded boat fleeing the flood capsized. The overflow of River Niger and downpour fuelled the rise of the water level. Riverine communities in the state have been submerged by the ravaging flood.

The three-storey Madonna Catholic Church in Iyiowa, Anambra West collapsed due to flooding on 9 October.

There are 28 IDP camps in Anambra state, where flood victims are sheltered and taken care of during flood emergency times. To reduce the stress and struggles for the flood victims, internally displaced camps (IDPs) were set up in different locations in Anambra state.

- Crowther Memorial Primary School Camp, Onitsha, Anambra State: This camp housed flood victims from different communities that included Mmiata-Anam, Umudora-Anam, Nzam, Ukwala, Inoma, and Owele from Anambra West Local Government Area of Anambra state. The inmates at the camp were about 1,800. 5 pregnant women delivered their babies in Crowther Memorial Primary School Camp, Onitsha. However, they were taken to General Hospital Onitsha for proper care after the delivery at the IDP camp.
- Onitsha North Council Area Internally Displaced People (IDP): The IDP camp housed about 400 people from Umuoba Anam and Ekpe Nneyi, Umueri in Anambra East Council Area. There were also flood victims from Delta State were accommodated in the camp where relief materials and other essentials were distributed.
- Ogbaru Local Government Area Camp: This is situated in Atani community. However, flood came and submerge the local government headquarter while the inmates were there. People came around with canoes and evacuated the flood victims that were trapped. It became a double tragedy for the flood victims.
- Umueri IDP camp
- Aguleri IDP camp

==== Bayelsa state ====
In the south region, bayelsa, it was gathered that 300 communities were affected by flood. Not fewer than 1.3 million people were victims of the natural disaster. About 96 persons have died while about 1.2 million people are displaced. Report says Findings on the impacts of the 2022 flooding on the residents of Yenagoa, Bayelsa State capital, show that over 71 to 77 per cent of residents were affected through building collapse, household items lost, livestock destroyed and many others.

==== Delta state ====
Between 26 November and 7 December 2022, it was identified that 78,640 individuals were affected by the floods in 18 locations in Delta State.

==== Jigawa state ====
Floods struck Jigawa State from August to September, where at least 92 people died.

==== Kano state ====
Earlier in the year, the Nigerian Meteorological Agency gave warning of an impending floods in the state.

==== Kogi state ====
Lokoja, situated at the confluence of the Benue and Niger rivers, is among the worst-affected areas of the flooding.

==== Niger state ====
In Mariga, Niger State, over 1,500 corpses were washed away from a cemetery. Officials said that 650 of the bodies were found and were reburied.

==== Yobe state ====
Severe flooding struck Yobe State in July and killed four people.

== See also ==
- 2022 Africa floods
- 2022 food crises
- Climate change in Nigeria
- List of dams and reservoirs in Nigeria
