= National Emergency Management Agency (Nigeria) =

Nigerian Government Agency

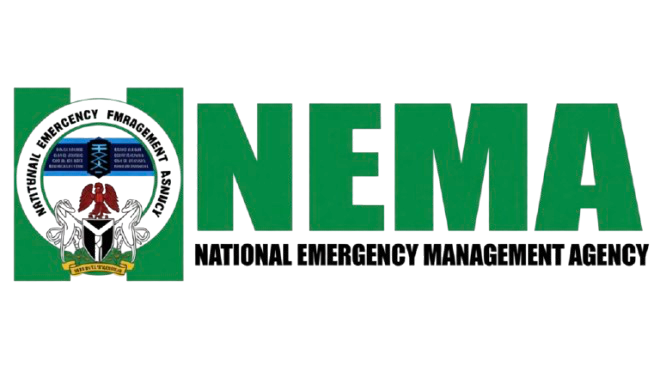

Agency overview
- Formed: 1999
- Jurisdiction: Government of Nigeria
- Headquarters: Abuja
- Minister responsible: Zubaida Umar, Director General
- Website: nema.gov.ng

The National Emergency Management Agency is an agency in Nigeria. The agency focuses on disaster management in all parts of the country. The agency was established in 1999, and functions to formulate policies relating to disaster management in Nigeria. Prior to this, disaster management was handled by the National Emergency Relief Agency (NERA), which was founded in 1976. NEMA was formally established via Act 12 of 23 March 1999, later amended by Act 50 of 1999, replacing NERA to manage disasters in Nigeria.

The agency coordinates with state-level emergency agencies called States’ Emergency Management Agencies, such as the Edo State Emergency Management Agency. These agencies were authorized by the NEMA act which created the national service. As of 2026, 34 of the 36 states of Nigeria had state level agencies.

== Functions ==
The NEMA Act vested the power of overseeing fiascos in Nigeria NEMA. As indicated by the empowering regulation; the Organization will among different things:

- Figure out strategy on movements of every sort connecting with the catastrophe the executives in Nigeria and co-ordinate the plans and projects for productive and impact reaction to fiascos at public level;
- Screen the condition of readiness of all.

== Major operations ==
NEMA has coordinated federal responses to large-scale natural disasters in Nigeria. During the 2012 flood disaster, the agency reported approximately 360 deaths and the displacement of around 2.3 million people across multiple states. During the 2022 flood season, NEMA coordinated relief efforts across 34 of the 36 states, addressing a crisis that displaced over 1.4 million people and caused widespread infrastructural damage. The agency also manages responses to recurring hazards, including windstorms, epidemics, and displacement linked to regional insecurity.

== Facilities and infrastructure ==
=== Mission Control Centre (MCC) ===
The mission Control Center is situated in the Central command of NEMA which is a computer structure satellite innovation that utilizes the COSPAS-SARSAT tech framework/facility. The framework is intended to pick trouble cautions and area information to aid Search and Salvage Activity, utilizing rocket and ground offices to recognize and find the signs of misery reference points working on 406 MHz. At the point when there is a trouble alert from the guide situated on a boat or airplane, the satellite framework communicates the sign to the ground fragment offices from where the information is handled and sent to the fitting Mission Control Center (MCC).

=== Geographic Information System (GIS) ===
NEMA laid out a Geography Information System lab for early advance notice and accuracy in light of the administration. The lab gathers spatial information, analyze them and plans valuable data that assists with helping reactions to problems. It is one of the larger offices of the organization for its debacle risk decrease program.

=== Mobile clinics ===
Time is a vital component in solving problems of the board. In acknowledgment of this, the organization acquired endorsement and obtained offices for versatile facilities that have been decisively positioned in Abuja, Kaduna, Lagos and Port Harcourt to be conveyed in case of any serious debacle. While game plans are on to secure a greater amount of the facilities, the organization has likewise obtained a lot of ambulances positioned in Abuja and every one of the six zonal workplaces.

== Directors General ==
- Muhammad Sani-Sidi
- Abbas Idriss
- Zubaida Umar (since March 15, 2024)

== Challenges and criticism ==
NEMA has faced scrutiny regarding its operational efficiency and resource allocation. Academic and humanitarian reports note that bureaucratic bottlenecks and funding shortages have led to delays in the distribution of relief materials to affected populations. Coordination challenges persist between the federal agency and state-level emergency management bodies, particularly in regions where local agencies lack statutory backing or operational capacity. In response, NEMA has initiated strategic reviews and advocated for reforms to the national disaster relief policy to streamline early action and resource deployment.
