= Edo State Emergency Management Agency =

Agency managing emergency in Edo State, Nigeria

Edo State Emergency Management Agency is an agency in Edo State, Nigeria responsible for response to natural disasters. The agency cooperates with the National Emergency Management Agency to coordinate responses to disasters. The agency was reorganized in 2017 to integrate it more with other security agencies in the state and produce a more proactive response to potential natural disasters.

The agency coordinates responses to local flooding. After multiple major floods, the agency began taking a proactive approach to work with local governments to prevent flooding before flooding events.

== See also ==
- Edo State Public Procurement Agency
