= Lagdo Reservoir =

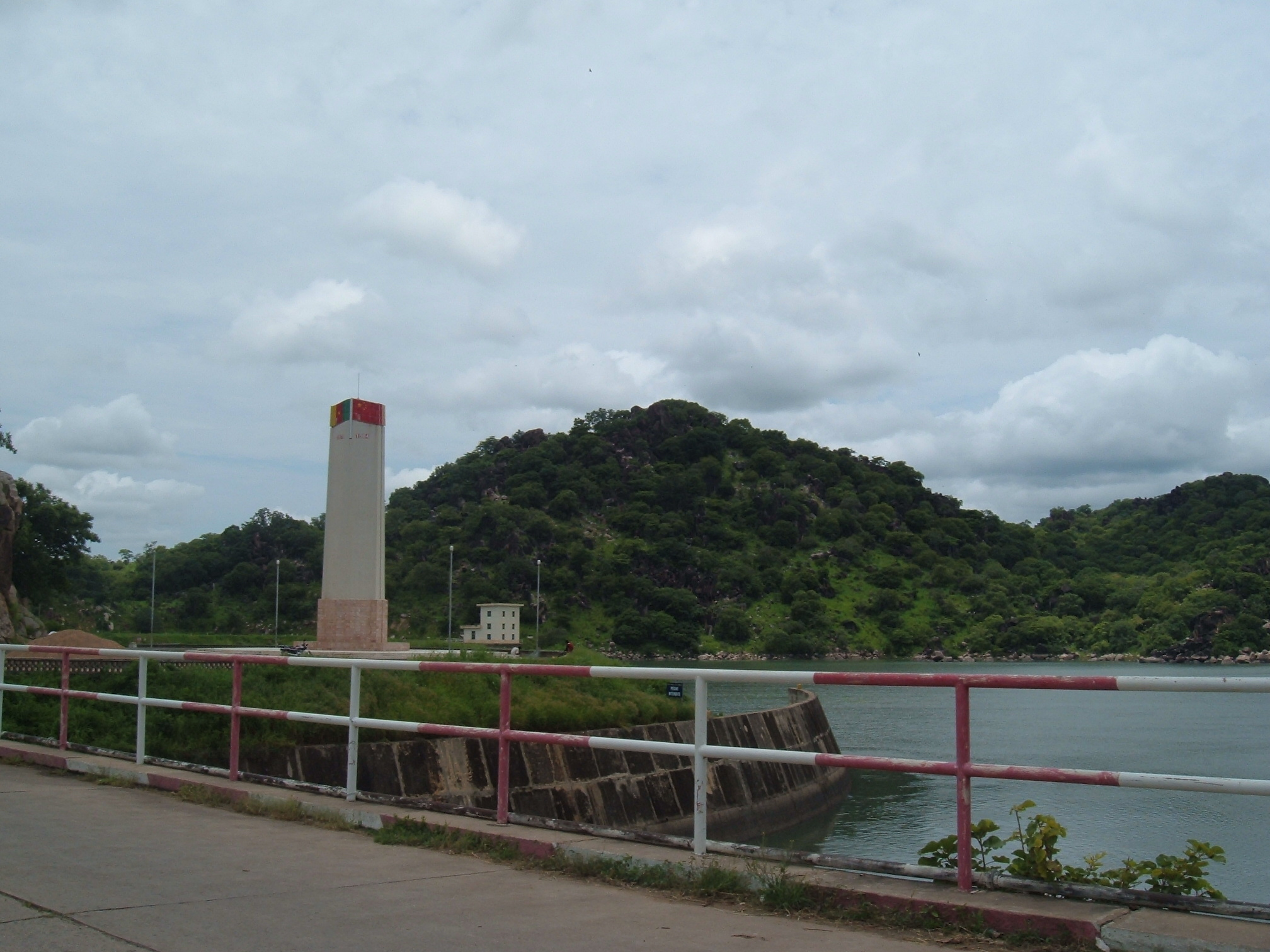
- Lagdo Reservoir in 2007

- Location within Cameroon Location within Africa
- Location: North Province
- Coordinates: 8°53′N 13°58′E
- Type: reservoir
- Primary inflows: Benue River
- Primary outflows: Benue River
- Basin countries: Cameroon
- Built: 1977–1982
- Surface area: 586 km^{2} (226 sq mi)

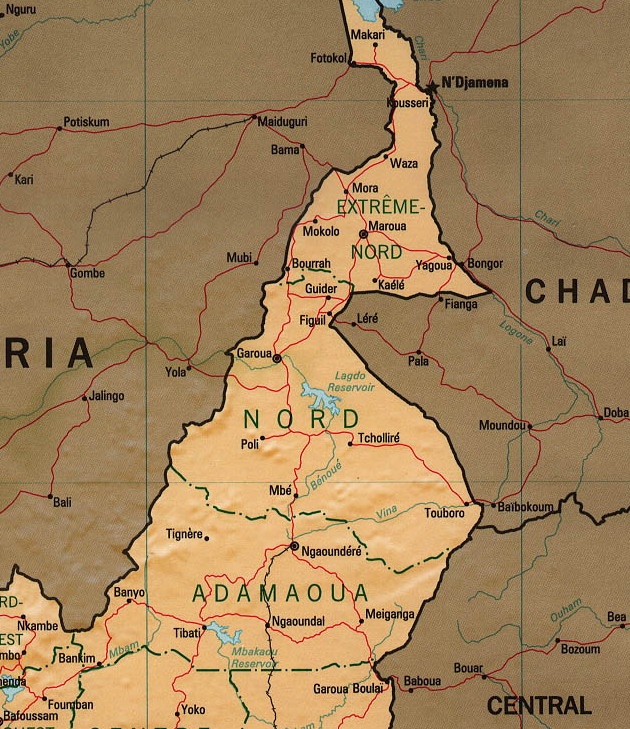
Location of Lagdo Reservoir in the centre in northern Cameroon.

Lagdo Reservoir is a reservoir located in the Northern Province of Cameroon, on the Benue River, in the Niger basin. The lake covers an area of 586 km^{2}.

== History ==
The Lagdo dam was built between August 1977 and July 1982 by a combination of engineers and Chinese workers, along with Cameroonian labourers. The company that managed the construction was the China International Water & Electric Corp. International power company AES Corporation runs the hydroelectric dam.

Its construction was intended to supply electricity to the northern part of the country and allow the irrigation of 15,000 hectares of crops downstream. The dam is 308 m long, 40 m in height and 9 m thick.

Its reservoir has a potential of 7.7 billion cubic meters. However, due to its aging and the silting up of its reservoir, its capacity has deteriorated over time reaching 1.6 billion m^{3} in 2021.

=== Location ===
The dam is located 50 km south of the city of Garoua on the Benue River. The dam is located within the Arrondissement de Lagdo in the Département de la Benoué in the North Province. It is situated more exactly at 8°53′N 13°58′E.

== Floods ==
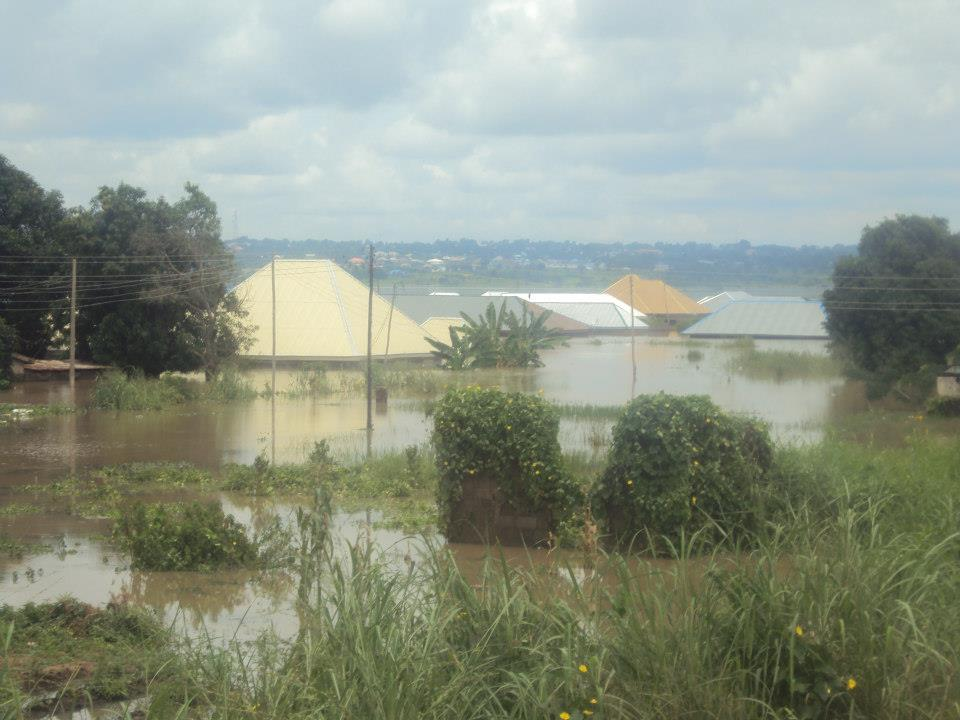
Houses submerged in Makurdi, Nigeria due to the flooding of Ladgo reservoir (2012).

In 2012, water released from the dam flooded areas including Adamawa State in Nigeria, resulting in more than 10 deaths and the loss of properties worth thousands of dollars. A bigger effect of the flooding was at the lower Benue river region where more than 10,000 homes were submerged for more than two weeks. This left more than 10,000 hectares of farmland flooded and the streets of Makurdi occupied by crocodiles and other dangerous creeping creatures.

In September 2022, an operation to release a portion of water from the Lagdo Dam began to secure its installations. Consequently, Nigerian authorities have indicated that the discharge of water from Lagdo caused farmland to be submerged and heavy flooding in 13 states, thus causing the death of 25 people in Adamawa State for instance. However, the Nigerian Minister of Water Resources, Suleiman Adamu Kazaure, stated that 80% of the floods in Nigeria are caused by rainfall and not the Lagdo Reservoir, and confirmed that the cause of the flood was due to water flowing from the tributaries of Katsina Ala River and others into Benue River due to heavy downpour.

The absence of dams to contain water released from the Lagdo Dam at any point in time has been identified as a major cause for flooding in Nigeria.

== Environmental and Social Impact ==
The construction and operation of the Lagdo Dam have had both positive and negative impacts on the surrounding environment and local communities.

=== Environmental Impact ===
- Disruption of River Ecology: The damming of the Benue River altered natural flow patterns, affecting fish migration, aquatic habitats, and biodiversity downstream.
- Silting: Over the years, sediment accumulation has significantly reduced the reservoir’s capacity, decreasing its efficiency and increasing the risk of flooding.
- Climate Resilience: The reservoir serves as an important water storage system in a region prone to drought, helping to buffer against seasonal rainfall variability caused by climate change.

=== Social Impact ===
- Displacement: The creation of the reservoir led to the displacement of several communities. Although some were relocated, reports suggest that resettlement programs were limited in scope and support.
- Livelihoods: The dam has facilitated irrigation and fishing in the reservoir, supporting agriculture and food production. However, seasonal flooding downstream, especially in Nigeria, continues to disrupt farming, destroy homes, and threaten public health.
- Transboundary Tensions: The release of water from the Lagdo Dam has occasionally strained relations between Cameroon and Nigeria, particularly when sudden discharges lead to downstream flooding without adequate warning or coordination.

Efforts have been made to improve cross-border communication, including the establishment of joint committees to share hydrological data. However, experts continue to call for more integrated, basin-wide water resource management strategies in the Niger Basin to mitigate risks and enhance sustainability.

== Political and Flood Mitigation Approaches ==
=== Political Context ===
Flood risks from Cameroon’s Lagdo Dam have long been a source of tension between Nigeria and Cameroon. Both countries initially agreed that Cameroon would construct the Lagdo Dam, while Nigeria would build the Dasin Hausa Dam downstream to regulate water flow and reduce flood risks along the Benue River. The Dasin Hausa Dam was also intended to support irrigation and electricity generation in northern Nigeria.

However, despite repeated studies and budgetary allocations over the years, the Nigerian government has not completed the Dasin Hausa Dam. The project has faced persistent delays due to bureaucratic inefficiencies, inconsistent funding, and lack of political prioritization. Although the Nigerian Senate renewed calls for the project’s completion as recently as November 2023, actual progress remains limited.

=== Flood Mitigation Measures ===
In lieu of a permanent solution, Nigeria has implemented short- and medium-term flood mitigation strategies:

- Early Warning Systems: Agencies such as the Nigeria Hydrological Services Agency (NIHSA) monitor dam releases and issue alerts. For example, in September 2024, NIHSA closely tracked inflows and coordinated controlled releases from Lagdo to reduce downstream impact.
- Emergency Response: The National Emergency Management Agency (NEMA) manages relocation efforts and distributes relief materials. However, these interventions are often reactive and constrained in scope.
- Federal Allocations: In 2024, the Nigerian government approved ₦108 billion for nationwide flood prevention projects, including dam maintenance and river dredging, following recommendations from the Presidential Committee on Flood Disaster Prevention.
- Community Preparedness: States along the Benue River are urged to heed evacuation warnings, though residents are frequently reluctant due to concerns about property and livelihood loss.

Experts argue that while these measures offer short-term relief, they do not address the root cause of recurrent floods. Completing the Dasin Hausa Dam is widely seen as the most sustainable solution to mitigate the flooding triggered by Lagdo Dam operations.

Political and Flood Mitigation Approaches
Approach	Description	Challenges
Bilateral Dam Plan	Lagdo (Cameroon) and Dasin Hausa (Nigeria) dam coordination	Nigeria's dam incomplete; political delays
Federal Budget Support	Allocations for flood control and infrastructure	Inconsistent disbursement
Early Warning Systems	Real-time monitoring and alerts during dam releases	Temporary, lacks preventive impact
Emergency Relief	Relocation and assistance led by NEMA	Reactive, not long-term
River Dredging	Senate-backed inclusion in 2024 federal budget	Implementation delays
