= List of polytechnics in Nigeria =

This article provides a list of polytechnics in Nigeria, as well as agricultural colleges and other tertiary educational institutes that provide practical training. It does not include universities or teachers' training institutions.

The polytechnics and colleges are regulated by the National Board for Technical Education (NBTE). The need for Polytechnics and Technical colleges in Nigeria arose during the third National Development Plan (1975 - 1980) which identified serious lack of technical know-how as a constraint towards the execution of the plan. This led to the establishment of the NBTE to manage the running of Technical colleges.

Polytechnics in Nigeria typically offer 2 year National Diploma(ND) program which can optionally be furthered at a Higher National Diploma(HND) program if desired.

Polytechnics and Technical Colleges are owned by Federal, State and Private institutions.

== Federal Institutions ==
Name	State	Location	Website
Air Force Institute of Technology	Kaduna State	Airforce Base, Kaduna	https://afit.edu.ng
Akanu Ibiam Federal Polytechnic	Ebonyi State	Unwana	https://akanuibiampoly.edu.ng
Auchi Polytechnic	Edo State	Auchi	https://auchipoly.edu.ng/ap/
Federal Polytechnic Ekowe	Bayelsa State	Ekowe	
Federal Polytechnic Idah	Kogi State	Idah	https://www.fepoda.edu.ng/
Federal Polytechnic Ile-Oluji	Ondo State	Ile Oluji	https://fedpolel.edu.ng/
Federal Polytechnic Kabo	Kano State	Kabo	https://fedpolykabo.edu.ng/
Federal Polytechnic Kaltungo	Gombe State	Kaltungo	https://fedpolyklt.edu.ng/
Federal Polytechnic Kaura-Namoda	Zamfara State	Kaura Namoda	https://fedponam.edu.ng/
Federal Polytechnic Ngodo Isuochi	Abia State	Aba North	
Federal Polytechnic of Oil and Gas Bonny	Rivers State	Bonny	https://fedpolybonny.edu.ng/
Federal Polytechnic Oko	Anambra State	Aguata	https://federalpolyoko.edu.ng/
Federal Polytechnic, Ado-Ekiti	Ekiti State	Ado Ekiti	https://fedpolyado.edu.ng/
Federal Polytechnic Ayede	Oyo State	Ayede	https://federalpolyayede.edu.ng/
Federal Polytechnic Bali	Taraba State	Bali	https://fedpolybali.edu.ng/
Federal Polytechnic, Bauchi	Bauchi State	Bauchi	https://fptb.edu.ng/
Federal Polytechnic, Bida	Niger State	Bida	https://fedpolybida.edu.ng/
Federal Polytechnic Damaturu	Yobe State	Damaturu	https://www.fedpodam.edu.ng/
Federal Polytechnic Daura	Katsina State	Daura	https://fedpolydaura.edu.ng/
Federal Polytechnic Ede	Osun State	Ede	https://www.federalpolyede.edu.ng/
Federal Polytechnic, Ilaro	Ogun State	Ilaro	https://federalpolyilaro.edu.ng/
Federal Polytechnic Monguno	Borno State	Monguno	https://fedpolymonguno.edu.ng/
Federal Polytechnic, Mubi	Adamawa State	Mubi	https://fpmubieportal.edu.ng/
Federal Polytechnic Nasarawa	Nasarawa State	Nasarawa	https://fpn.edu.ng/
Federal Polytechnic, Nekede	Imo State	Nekede	https://fpno.edu.ng/
Federal Polytechnic Nyak Shendam	Plateau State	Shendam	https://fedpolynyakshendam.edu.ng/
Federal Polytechnic, Offa	Kwara State	Offa	https://fedpoffaonline.edu.ng/
Federal Polytechnic Ohodo	Enugu State	Ohodo	https://fedpod.edu.ng/
Federal Polytechnic Orogun	Delta State	Orogun	https://www.fepo.edu.ng/
Federal Polytechnic Ugep	Cross River State	Ugep	https://fedpolyugep.edu.ng/
Federal Polytechnic Ukana	Akwa Ibom State	Ukana	https://fedpolyukana.edu.ng/
Federal Polytechnic Wannune	Benue State	Tarka	https://fedpolywannune.edu.ng/
Hussaini Adamu Federal Polytechnic	Jigawa State	Kazaure	https://www.hafedpoly.edu.ng/
Kaduna Polytechnic	Kaduna State	Kaduna	https://kadunapoly.edu.ng/
Maritime Academy of Nigeria	Akwa Ibom State	Oron	https://maritimeacademy.gov.ng/
National Institute of Construction Technology and Management	Edo State	Uromi	https://www.nict.edu.ng/
Nigerian Army College of Environmental Science and Technology	Benue State	Makurdi	
Nigerian College of Aviation Technology	Kaduna State	Zaria	https://ncat.gov.ng/
Petroleum Training Institute	Delta State	Effurun	https://pti.edu.ng/
Waziri Umaru Federal Polytechnic	Kebbi State	Birnin Kebbi	https://wufpbk.edu.ng/index/
Yaba College of Technology	Lagos State	Yaba	https://www.yabatech.edu.ng/

== State Institutions ==
Name	State	Location	Website
Abdu Gusau Polytechnic	Zamfara State	Talata Mafara	https://agpmafara.edu.ng/
Ogbonnaya Onu Polytechnic (Abia State Polytechnic)	Abia State	Aba	https://abiastatepolytechnic.edu.ng/
Abraham Adesanya Polytechnic	Ogun State	Ijebu-Igbo	https://aapoly.edu.ng/
Abubakar Tatari Polytechnic	Bauchi State	Bauchi	https://atapoly.edu.ng/
Adamawa State Polytechnic	Adamawa State	Yola	http://adamawapoly.edu.ng/
Adeseun Ogundoyin Polytechnic	Oyo State	Eruwa	https://aope.edu.ng/
Akawe Torkula Polytechnic	Benue State	Makurdi	
Akwa Ibom State College of Arts and Science	Akwa-Ibom State	Ikono	
Akwa Ibom State Polytechnic	Akwa Ibom State	Ikot Ekpene	https://akwaibompoly.edu.ng/
Anambra State Polytechnic	Anambra State	Awka North	https://www.anspoly.edu.ng/
Bayelsa State Polytechnic	Bayelsa State	Ekeremor	https://bayelsastatepoly.edu.ng/
Benue State Polytechnic	Benue State	ugbokolo	https://benpolyonline.edu.ng/
Binyamu Usman Polytechnic	Jigawa State	Hadejia	https://bupoly.edu.ng/
College of Administration, Management and Technology, Potiskum	Yobe State	Potiskum	
College of Agriculture, Science and Technology, Gujba	Yobe State	Gujba	
College of Agriculture, Science and Technology, Lafia	Nasarawa State	Lafia	https://coastlafia.edu.ng/
Cross River Institute of Technology and Management	Cross River State	Ugep	
D.S Agbenro ICT Polytechnic, Itori-Ewekoro	Ogun State	Ewekoro	https://dsadegbenropoly.edu.ng/
Delta State Maritime Polytechnic	Delta State	Burutu	https://dsmt.edu.ng/
Delta State Polytechnic, Ogwashi-Uku	Delta State	Aniocha South	https://mydspg.edu.ng/
Delta State Polytechnic, Otefe-Oghara	Delta State	Ethiope West	https://ogharapoly.edu.ng/
Edo State Polytechnic Usen	Edo State	Ovia South West	https://edopoly.edu.ng/
Ekiti State College of Agriculture and Technology	Ekiti State	Ado-Ekiti	https://ekscotech.edu.ng/
Gateway Polytechnic, Saapade	Ogun State	Saapade	https://new.gaposa.edu.ng/
Gombe State Polytechnic	Gombe State	Bajoga	https://gspb.edu.ng/
Hassan Usman Katsina Polytechnic	Katsina State	Katsina	
Imo State Polytechnic	Imo State	Oru East	https://imopoly.edu.ng/
Institute of Management and Technology, Enugu	Enugu State	Enugu East	https://imt.edu.ng/
Isa Mustapha Agwai Polytechnic, Lafia	Nasarawa State	Lafia	https://imap.edu.ng/
Jigawa State Polytechnic	Jigawa State	Dutse	https://jigpoly.edu.ng/
Kano State Polytechnic	Kano State	Kano	https://kanopoly.edu.ng/
Katsina Institute of Technology and Management	Katsina State	Katsina	https://www.ksitm.edu.ng/
Kebbi State Polytechnic	Kebbi State	Dakingari	https://kespodak.edu.ng/
Kenule Beeson Saro-Wiwa Polytechnic, Bori	Rivers State	Bori	https://kenpoly.edu.ng/web2/
Kogi State Polytechnic	Kogi State	Lokoja	https://www.kogistatepolytechnic.edu.ng/
Kwara State Polytechnic	Kwara State	Ilorin	https://www.kwarastatepolytechnic.edu.ng/
Mai-Idris Alooma Polytechnic, Geidam	Yobe State	Geidam	https://miapoly.edu.ng/
Moshood Abiola Polytechnic	Ogun State	Abeokuta	https://mapoly.edu.ng/
Niger State Polytechnic	Niger State	Zungeru	https://www.nigerpoly.edu.ng/home.php
Nuhu Bamalli Polytechnic	Kaduna State	Zaria	https://nubapoly.edu.ng/
Ogun State Institute of technology	Ogun State	Igbesa	https://ogitech.edu.ng/
Osun State College of Technology	Osun State	Esa-Oke	https://oscotechesaoke.edu.ng/oscosite/
Osun State Polytechnic	Osun State	Iree	https://ospoly.edu.ng/ospolyhome/
Oyo State College of Agriculture and Technology	Oyo State	Igboora	https://oyscatech.edu.ng/
Plateau State Polytechnic	Plateau State	Barkin-Ladi	https://plapoly.edu.ng/
Captain Elechi Amadi Polytechnic (formerly Port-Harcourt Polytechnic)	Rivers State	Port-Harcourt	https://ceapoly.edu.ng/
Ramat Polytechnic	Borno State	Maiduguri	
Rufus Giwa Polytechnic	Ondo State	Owo	
Taraba State Polytechnic	Taraba State	Suntai	https://tarabapoly.edu.ng/
The Oke-Ogun Polytechnic	Oyo State	Saki	https://tops.edu.ng/
The Polytechnic Ibadan	Oyo State	Ibadan	
The Polytechnic Iresi	Osun State	Iresi	https://thepolytechniciresi.edu.ng/
Umaru Ali Shinkafi Polytechnic	Sokoto State	Wamako	https://uasp.edu.ng/

== Private Institutions ==
Name	State	Location	Website
Ajayi Polytechnic	Ekiti State	Ikere	https://ajayipolytechnic.edu.ng/
Al-Hikmah	Nasarawa State	Karu	https://alhikma.edu.ng/
Allover Central Polytechnic	Ogun State	Sango-Ota	
American Polytechnic	Oyo State	Wasimi	https://wapoly.edu.ng/
Ashi Polytechnic	Benue State	Anyin	
Bellarks Polytechnic	Benue State	Kwale	https://www.bellarkspoly.edu.ng/
Best Solution Polytechnic	Ondo State	Akure	https://www.bestpotech.edu.ng/
Bolmor Polytechnic	Oyo State	Ibadan	https://bpi.edu.ng
Brainfill Polytechnic	Akwa-Ibom State	Ikot-Ekpene	https://brainfillpolytechnic.edu.ng/
British Transatlantic Polytechnic	Ondo State	Akure	https://www.britishpoly.edu.ng/
Calvary Polytechnic	Delta State	Ika North East	https://calvarypoly.edu.ng/
Citi Polytechnic	Federal Capital Territory	Bwari	https://citipolytechnic.edu.ng/
Coastal Polytechnic	Lagos State	Badagry	https://coastalpoly.edu.ng/
Covenant Polytechnic	Abia State	Aba	https://covenantpolytechnic.com/
Crown Polytechnic	Ekiti State	Ado-Ekiti	https://crownpolytechnic.edu.ng/
Daboss Polytechnic	Osun State	Idominasi	https://www.dabosspolytechnic.edu.ng/
Distinct Polytechnic	Osun State	Ekosin	https://distinctpoly.edu.ng/
Dorben Polytechnic	FCT	Bwari	https://www.dorbenpolytechnic.edu.ng/
Eastern Polytechnic	Rivers State	Port-Harcourt	https://easternpolytechnic.org/
Edward Olaseni Polytechnic	Ondo State	Akoko	
Ekiti City Polytechnic	Ekiti State	Umuooke	https://ekiticitypolytechnic.edu.ng/
Eko College of Management and Technology(Ekocity)	Lagos State	Ikotun	https://new.ekocity.edu.ng/
El-thomp Polytechnic	Akwa-Ibom State	Abak	https://el-thomp-edu.ng/
Enville Polytechnic	Lagos State	Ikeja	https://envillepoly.edu.ng/
Fidei Polytechnic	Benue State	Gboko	
First City Polytechnic	Ogun State	Abeokuta	https://firstcitypoly.edu.ng/
Foundation Polytechnic	Akwa-Ibom State	Ikot-Ekpene	https://foundationpoly.com.ng/index.php/aboutus
Gboko Polytechnic	Benue State	Gboko	https://gbokopoly.edu.ng/
Global Polytechnic	Edo State	Benin	https://www.theglobalpolytechnic.edu.ng/
Gloryland Polytechnic	Kogi State	Ankpa	
Gozie Anyachebelu Oragram Polytechnic	Anambra State	Oraukwu	https://gozpoly.com/about-us/
Grace Polytechnic	Lagos State	Surulere	
Graceland Polytechnic	Kwara State	Offa	
Grundtvig Polytechnic	Anambra State	Oba	https://grundtvigpolytechnic.com/
Harry Pass Polytechnic	Benue State	Mkar	
Harvard Polytechnic	Kwara State	Ilorin	https://harvardpolytechnic.edu.ng/
Heritage Polytechnic	Akwa-Ibom State	Eket	https://heritagepoly.edu.ng/
Hope Polytechnic	Akwa Ibom State	Ikono	
I-con Universal Polytechnic	Osun State	Oshogbo	https://i-conuniversalpoly.edu.ng/
Ibadan City Polytechnic	Oyo State	Ibadan	https://icp.edu.ng/
Ibom Metropolitan Polytechnic	Akwa Ibom State	Atan Offot	https://www.ibommetropoly.edu.ng/site/
Igbajo Polytechnic	Osun State	Igbajo	https://www.igbajopolytechnic.edu.ng/
Iheachukwu Madubuike Institute of Technology	Abia State	Umunneochi	https://www.imit.edu.ng/
Inspire Polytechnic	Lagos State	Yaba	https://inspirepolytechnic.edu.ng/
Intercontinental College of Technology	Benue State	Makurdi	https://ictmakurdi.com/
Interlink Polytechnic	Osun State	Ijebu-Jesa	https://www.interlinkpolytechnic.edu.ng
Iwo City Polytechnic	Osun State	Iwo	https://iwocitypoly.com/
Kings Polytechnic	Edo State	Ubiaja	https://kingspolytechnic.com/
Lagos City Polytechnic	Lagos State	Ikeja	
Landmark Polytechnic	Ogun State	Aiyetoro	https://landmarkpolytechnic.edu.ng/
Lens Polytechnic	Kwara State	Offa	https://lenspolytechnic.edu.ng/
Lighthouse Polytechnic	Edo State	Orhionmwon	
Loam Polytechnic	Akwa Ibom State	Ikono	https://www.loampolytechnic.edu.ng
Madonna College of Health Technology	Abia State	Umuahia South	https://www.macohtech.edu.ng/
Marist Polytechnic	Enugu State	Enugu	https://marist.tenece.com/#
Mater Dei Polytechnic	Enugu State	Ugwuoba	
Montgomery Polytechnic	Ekiti State	Ikere	https://montgomerypolytechnic.edu.ng/
Mustibrah Polytechnic	Kano State	Tudun Fulani	https://mustibrah.edu.ng/
NACABS Polytechnic	Nasarawa State	Akwanga	https://nacabspoly.edu.ng
Nation Builders Polytechnic	Delta State	Asaba	https://nabcotech.edu.ng/
Newland Polytechnic	Kwara State	Ilorin	https://www.newlandpolytechnic.edu.ng/
NOGAK Polytechnic	Cross River State	Ikom	
Novelty Polytechnic	Oyo State	Kishi	
Odaji Agbo Polytechnic	Cross River State	Ayeko-Yala	
Oduduwa Polytechnic	Lagos State	Idimu	https://www.oduduwapolytechnic.edu.ng/
Our Saviour Institute of Science and Technology	Enugu State	Enugu	https://osisat.edu.ng/poly/
Paramount Polytechnic	Lagos State	Ejigbo	https://paramountpolytechnic.edu.ng/
Prime Polytechnic	Kogi State	Ajaokuta	
Raindrops Institute of Management and Technology	Imo State	Orsu	
Ronik Polytechnic	Lagos State	Ejigbo	https://ronikpolytechnic.edu.ng/
SAF Polytechnic	Osun State	Iseyin	https://safpolytechnic.edu.ng/
Shaka Polytechnic	Edo State	Benin City	https://shakapoly.edu.ng
Stars Polytechnic	Ogun State	Ota	https://www.starspoly.edu.ng/
Sure Foundation Polytechnic	Akwa Ibom State	Ikot-Akai	https://www.sfp.edu.ng/
Temple Gate Polytechnic	Abia State	Aba	https://tgp.edu.ng/
The Polytechnic, Adoka	Benue State	Adoka	
The Polytechnic, Igbo-Owu	Kwara State	Igbo-Owu	http://thepolytechnicigboowu.edu.ng/
The Polytechnic, Ile-Ife	Osun State	Ile-Ife	
TimeOn Kairos Polytechnic	Lagos State	Agege	https://tkevi.edu.ng
Trinity Polytechnic	Akwa Ibom State	Uyo	https://trinitypoly.edu.ng/
Ultra Excellence Polytechnic	Akwa Ibom	Ikono	
Unique College of Management and Technology	Lagos State	Ikotun	
United Polytechnic	Plateau State	Jos	https://www.unipoly.edu.ng
Villanova Polytechnic	Osun State	Obokun	
Vineyard Polytechnic	Nasarawa	Karu	https://vineyardpoly.com/
Westland Polytechnic	Osun	Ilobu	https://vineyardpoly.com/

== Colleges of Nursing ==
Name	State	Ownership	Location	Website
AB Naibi College of Nursing Sciences	Taraba State	Private	Lau	

== See also ==
- List of agricultural universities and colleges
- List of universities in Nigeria
- List of federal polytechnic in nigeria
