= Federal Polytechnic =

Federal Polytechnic may refer to:

== Nigeria ==
- Federal Polytechnic, Ado-Ekiti, Ekiti State
- Federal Polytechnic, Ayede, Oyo State
- Federal Polytechnic, Bauchi, Bauchi State
- Federal Polytechnic Bida, Niger State
- Federal Polytechnic, Ede, Osun State
- Federal Polytechnic, Idah, Kogi State
- Federal Polytechnic, Ilaro, Ogun State
- Federal Polytechnic, Ile-Oluji, Ondo State
- Federal Polytechnic, Kaura-Namoda, Zamfara State
- Federal Polytechnic, Mubi, Adamawa State
- Federal Polytechnic Nasarawa, Nasarawa State
- Federal Polytechnic, Nekede, Imo State
- Federal Polytechnic, Offa, Kwara State
- Federal Polytechnic, Oko, Anambra State
- Federal Polytechnic, Ukana, Akwa Ibom State
- Yaba College of Technology, renamed in 1979-1980 as Federal Polytechnic Yaba

== Switzerland ==
- ETH Zurich, previously Federal Polytechnic Institute

== See also ==
- List of polytechnics in Nigeria
