= Dorben Polytechnic =

Polytechnic in Niger State, Nigeria

Coordinates: 9°19′0″N 7°21′0″E

- Motto: Standard Education At Its Peak
- Type: Private
- Established: 1995; 31 years ago
- Location: Bwari, Niger State, Nigeria
- Campus: Rural
- Colours: Blue; White
- Website: poly.dorben.edu.ng
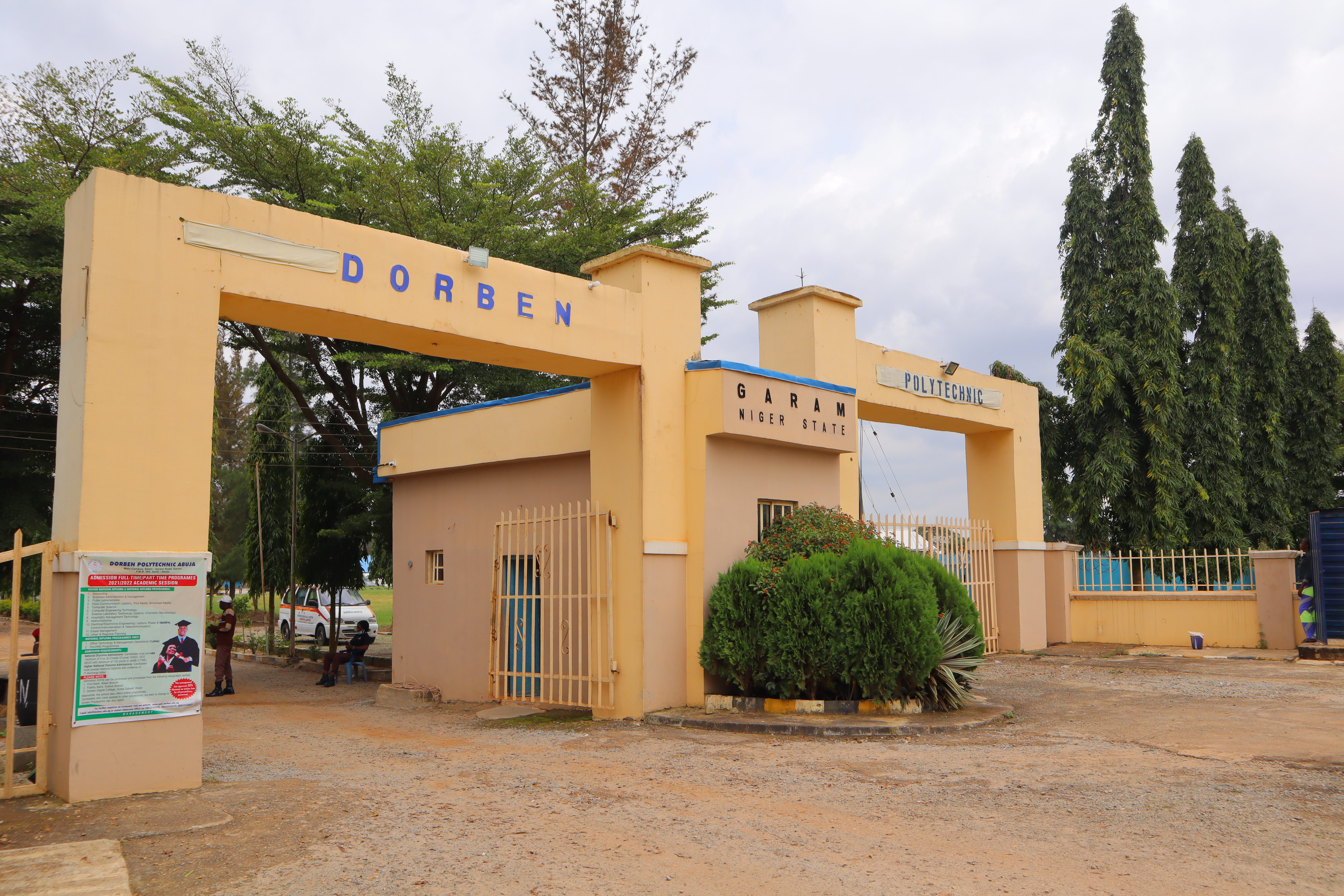

Dorben Polytechnic, is a private tertiary institution accredited by the Federal Ministry of Education (FME) and the National Board for Technical Education (NBTE) in Nigeria, West Africa. Dorben Polytechnic was established to provide high quality academic studies for individuals Who intend to develop careers as profession.

Dorben Polytechnic (formerly Abuja School of Accountancy and Computer Studies-ASACS) has its main campus located in Garam, Niger State, Nigeria, and another campus just to the north in Suleja, Niger State. It is usually addressed as Dorben Polytechnic (Bwari) Abuja, since it originally had its main campus in Bwari, Abuja (and which is where the process of accreditation started). Privately owned, the polytechnic provides training leading to the award of National Diploma (ND) and Higher National Diploma (HND) programs for students who intend to work as accountants, computer specialists, administrators, and managers.

== History ==
It was incorporated in 1995 and was approved and accredited as a school by the National Board for Technical Education and the Nigerian Federal Ministry of Education in 1999. Starting with just 250 students, as of 2010, Dorben had more than 3500 students and over 45 faculty members. Before being accredited as a polytechnic in 2007, the school had to acquire 50 hectares of land and have a minimum of one hundred million naira bank guarantee and mount core engineering programs.

In September 2008, the National Association of Nigerian Students bestowed an award of Excellence on the chairman of the management board of the Dorben Polytechnic, Dr. A.B. Ekwere. Speaking in October 2009, Ekwere said that four lecturers who had been sacked for examination malpractices were seeking the help of local chiefs to beg for their reinstatement. He was not sympathetic, and said that the institution made every effort to prevent cheating on exams.

== Schools ==
The institution offers a range of courses and programs in National Diploma and Higher Diploma with Major Faculty on the following programmes;

School of Business Studies

- Business Administration and Management
- Accountancy
- Office Technology and Management
- Public Administration
- Mass Communication

School of Natural and Applied Sciences

- Mathematics and Statistics
- Science Laboratory Technology
- Computer Science
- Hospitality Management

School of Engineering and Environmental Studies

- Electrical/Electronic Engineering
- Computer Engineering technology
- Urban and Regional Planning
- Estate Management
Campus of Dorben polytechnic

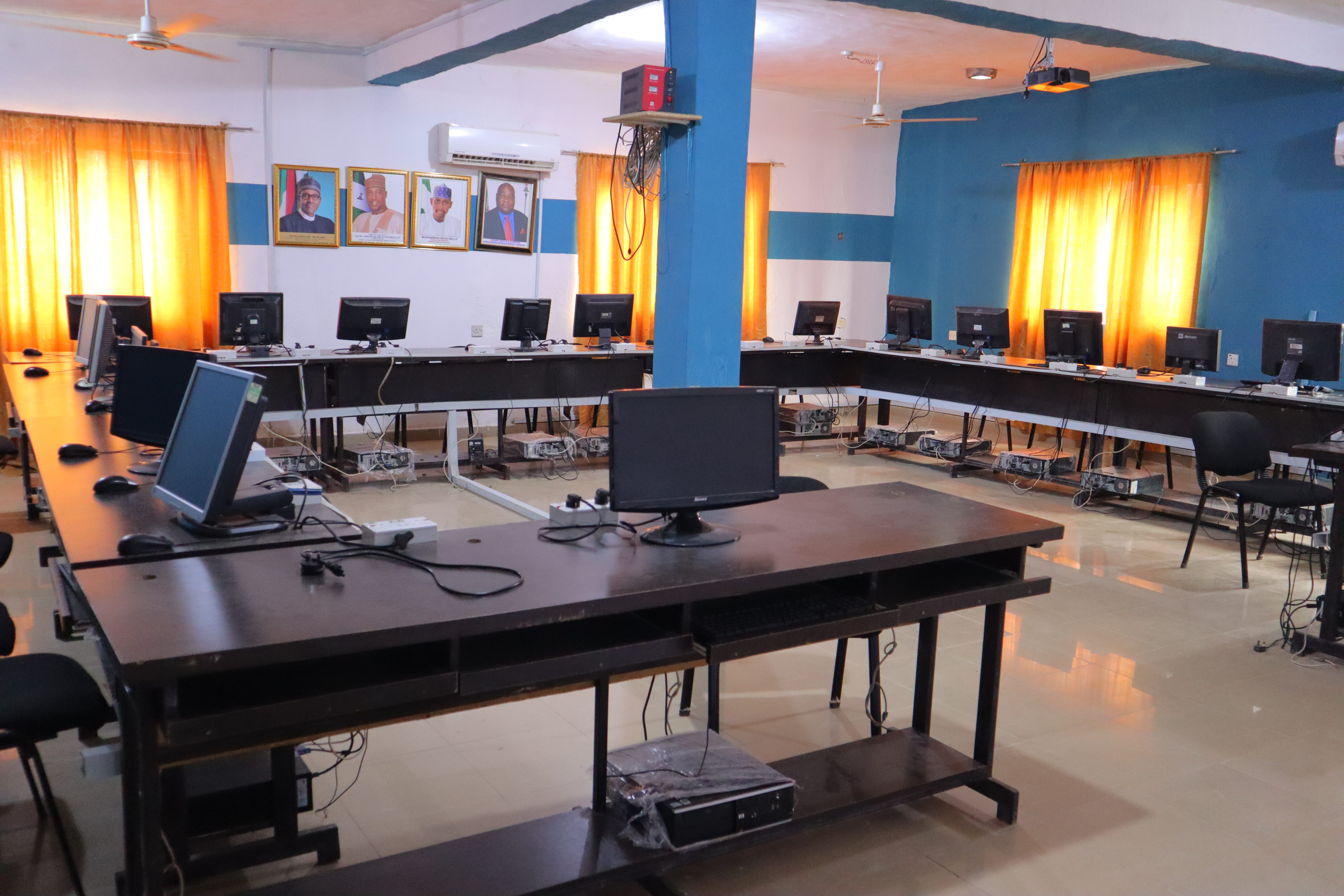
E-Learning center

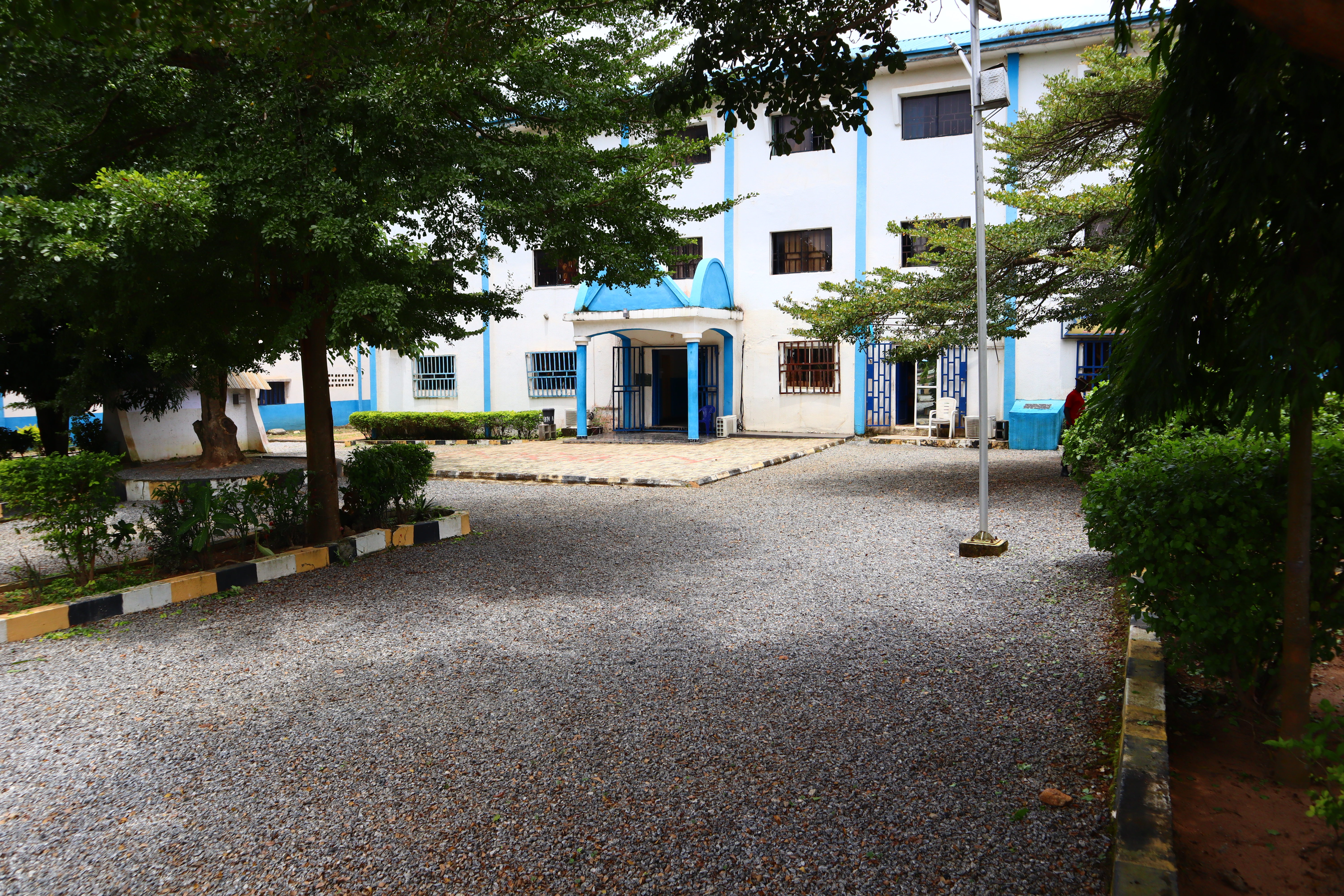
Administration building

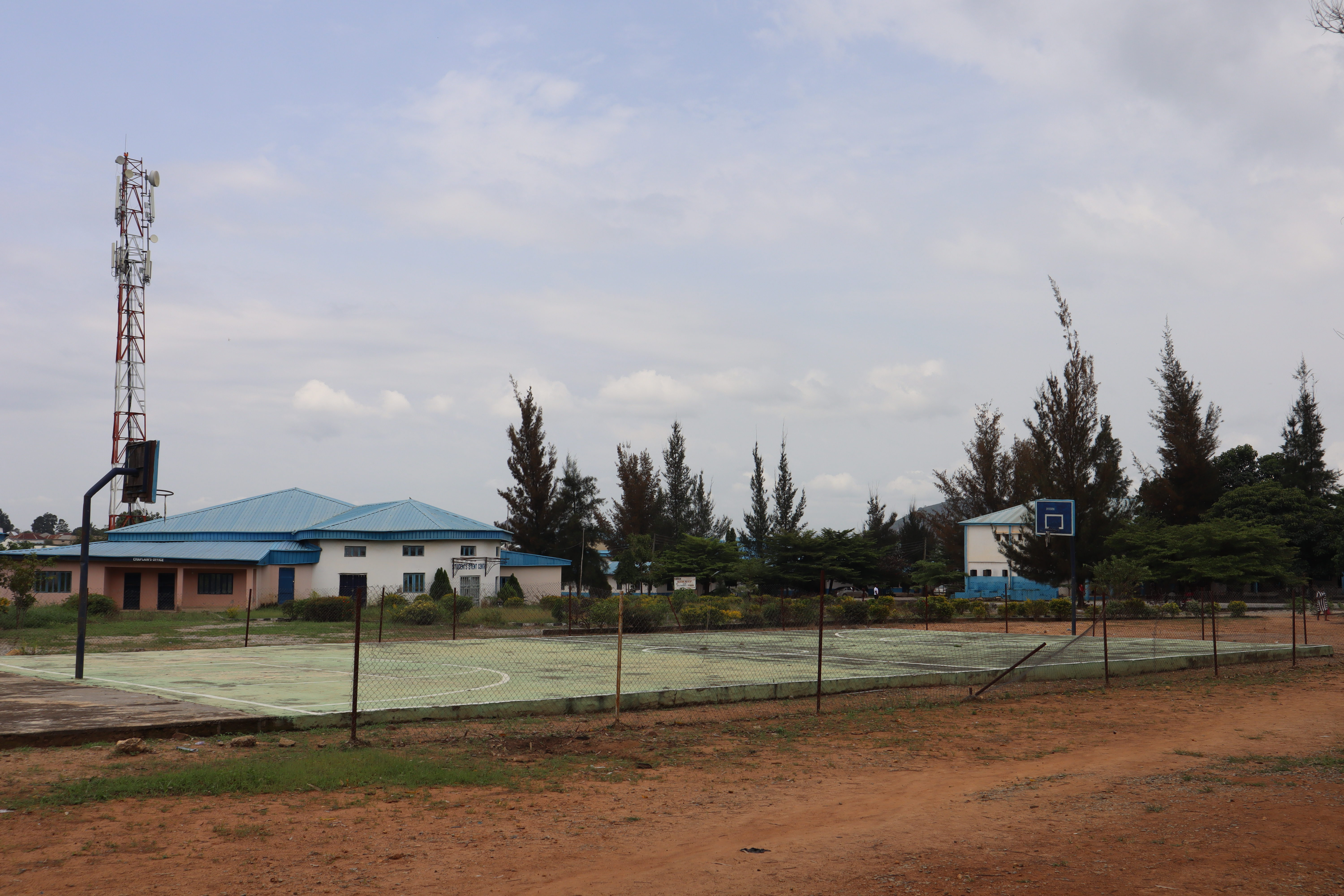
Sports arena

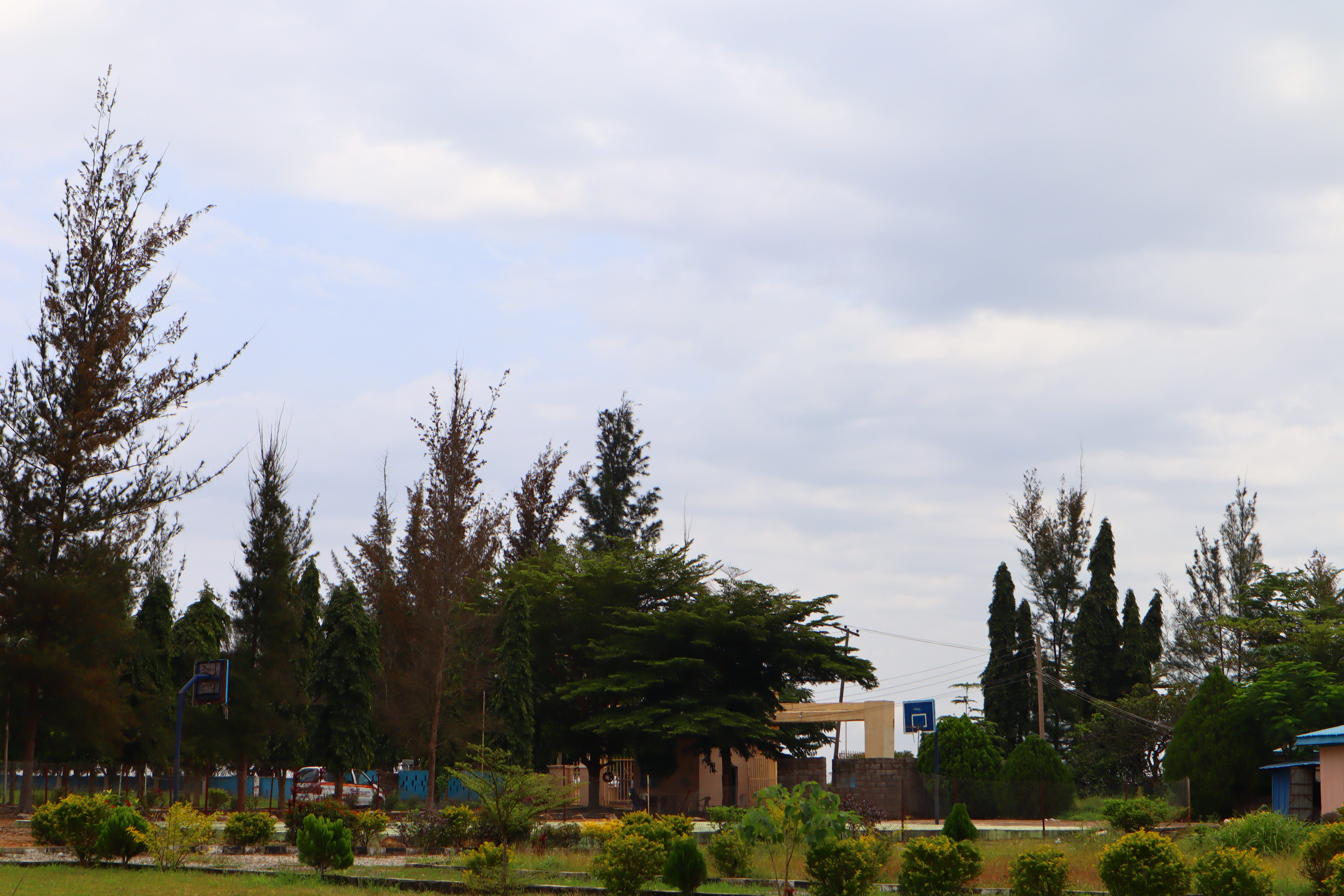
Campus grounds

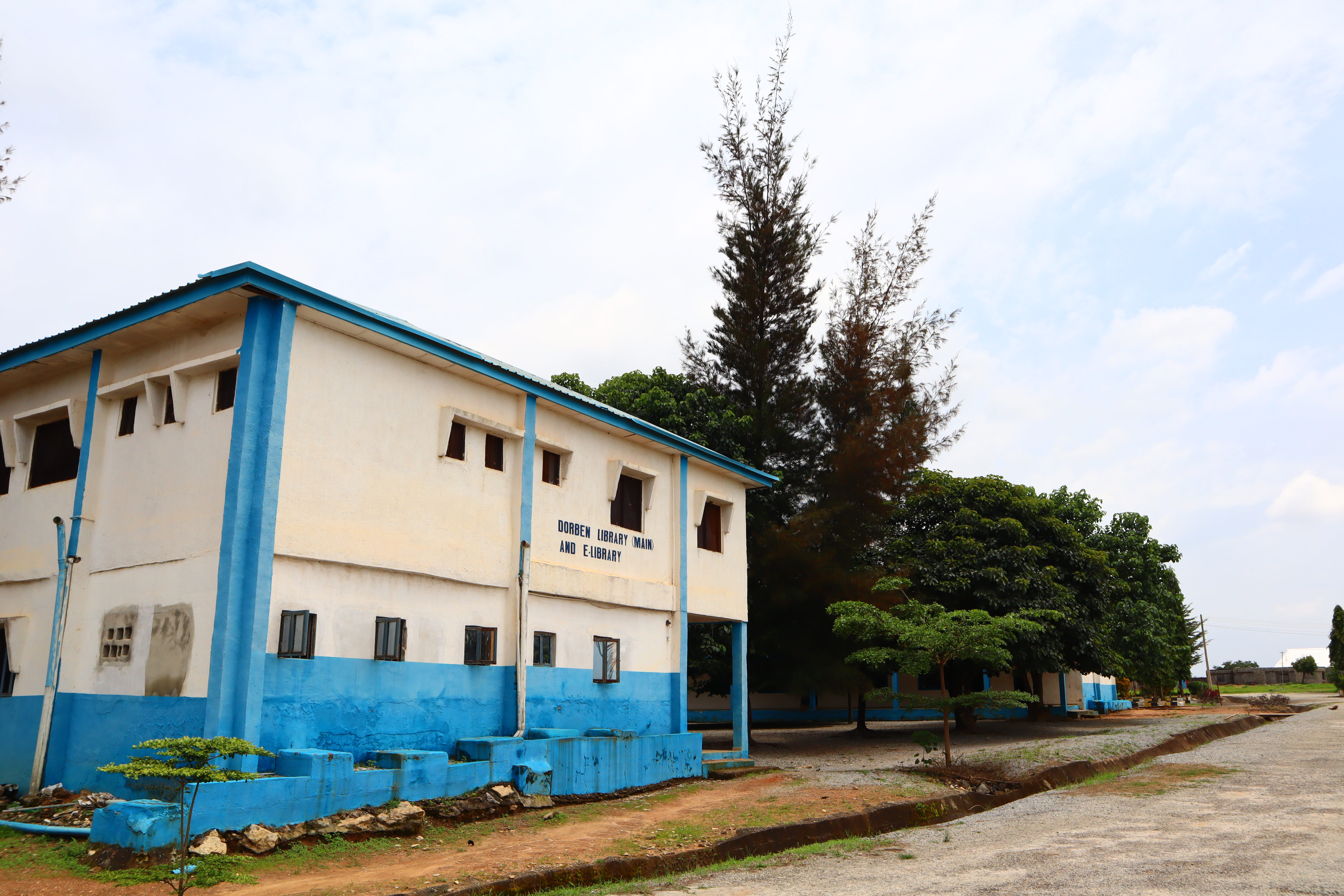
Library building

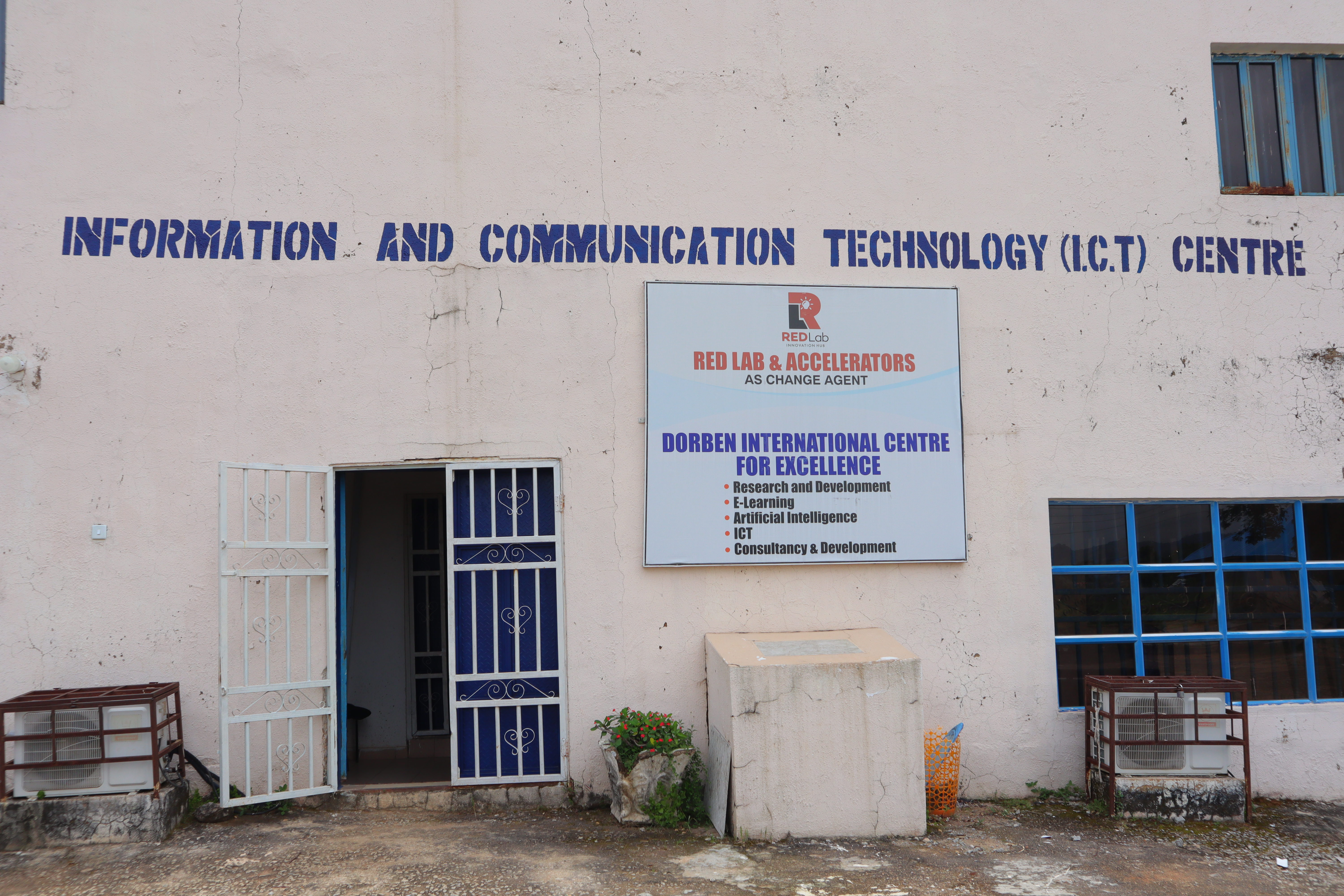
Information and Communication centre

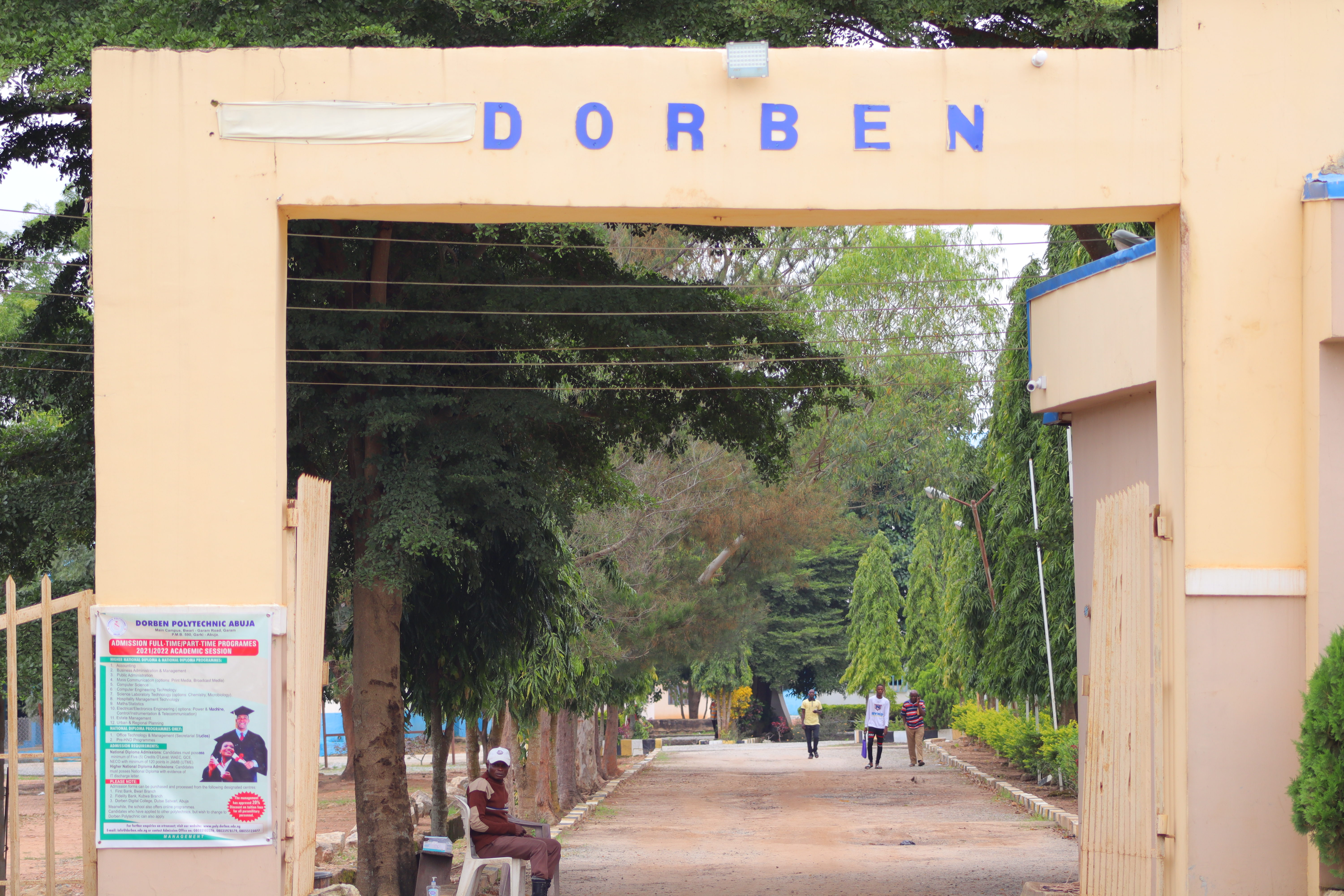
Polytechnic Entrance

== Open, Distance and Flexible E-Learning(ODFEL)Programmes ==
The Open, Distance, and Flexible E-learning Program( ODFEL) offers National Diploma, Higher Diploma, and Certificate courses. The ODFEL program gives students the freedom to learn from anywhere, anytime, and anyhow. This allows the learner to do other business and study at their convenient time.

== Library ==
The Library host information resources both online and database which support teaching and learning in the school.

== See also ==
- List of polytechnics in Nigeria
