= Akwa Ibom State Polytechnic =

State Polytechnic in Nigeria

Coordinates: 5°9′25″N 7°40′11″E

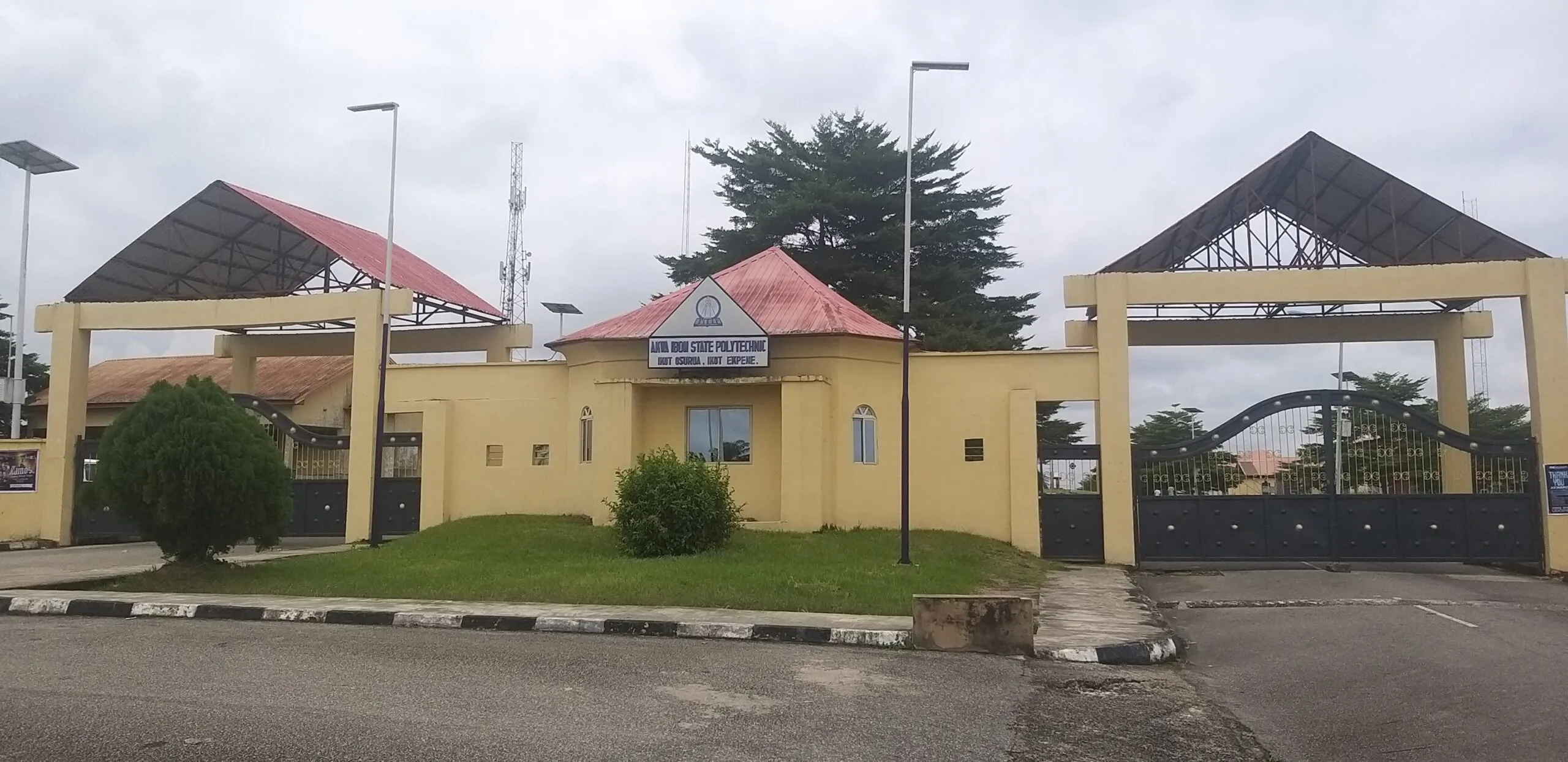
- Type: State Polytechnic
- Established: 1991
- Founder: Akwa Ibom State Government
- Location: Ikot Ekpene, Akwa Ibom
- Website: akwaibompoly.edu.ng

Akwa Ibom State Polytechnic is a tertiary learning institution in Ikot Osurua, Ikot Ekpene, Akwa Ibom State, Nigeria. It was founded in 1991. The institution is accredited by the National Board for Technical Education (NBTE) with the mandate to provide access to education in technology and commerce. it offers both ordinary and higher national diplomas to students on graduation.

== History ==
Akwa Ibom State Polytechnic was established by Akwa Ibom State of Akwa Ibom State Government edict no:11 of 1991. The decision to establish the institution was taken after the creation of Akwa Ibom state from Cross River State in 1987, the official commissioning of the institution took place on Friday 24 January 1992. A total of 961 students were admitted and registered in fifteen academic programmes established by the Ministry of Education. The programmes were Science, Environmental Studies, Communication Arts and Engineering

== Library ==
The polytechnic library has digital information resources that support teaching and learning in the institutions and the library is open from 8 to 9 o'clock daily.

== Courses ==
The polytechnic runs various courses under schools/faculties such as Applied Sciences, Communication Arts, Preliminary Studies, Business and Management, Engineering, Environmental Studies and Legal Studies.

School of Applied Sciences

- Department of Computer Science
- Department of Hotel and Catering Management
- Department of Science Technology
- Department of Statistics

School of Business Management

- Department of Accountancy
- Department of Business Administration
- Department of Office Technology & Management
- Department of Marketing
- Department of Public Administration
- Department of Legal Studies

School of Communication Arts

- Department of Arts and Design
- Department of General Studies
- Department of Mass Communication

School of Engineering

- Department of Civil Engineering
- Department of Electrical/ Electronic Engineering
- Department of Mechanical Engineering

School of environmental Studies

- Department of Architecture
- Department of Building Technology
- Department of Estate Management
- Department of Surveying and Geo-Informatics
- Department of Quantity Surveying
- Department of Urban and Regional Planning

The polytechnic is owned by Akwa Ibom State. In 2019, the Governor of the State promised to give the institution a grant of One hundred million naira to ensure that all the courses they offer are fully accredited.

== Part-time/Evening Programme Courses ==
=== School of Applied Sciences ===
- Science Laboratory Technology
- Computer Science
- Statistics

=== School of Business and Management ===
- Accountancy
- Banking & Finance
- Business Administration
- Marketing
- Office Technology & Management
- Public Administration

=== School of Communication Art ===
- Mass Communication

=== School of Engineering ===
- Electrical/ Electronic Engineering Technology
- Computer Engineering
- Civil Engineering Technology

=== School of Environmental Studies ===
- Architecture Technology
- Building Technology
- Estate Management
- Quantity Surveying
- Urban and Regional Planning

== Entrepreneur/skill/partnership ==
Akwa ibom polytechnic partner with SMEDAN to create a skill acquisition club in the school. The partnership is to help students in acquiring entrepreneur skills closer to them on self development.

== Ranking ==
In 2023 Akwa poly is ranked the second polytechnic in Nigeria.

== See also ==
- List of polytechnics in Nigeria
