= Temple Gate Polytechnic =

Private Polytechnic in Nigeria

- Motto: Knowledge and Skill to serve humanity
- Type: Private
- Established: 2009
- Affiliations: National Board for Technical Education
- Rector: Mrs. Chinedu Ibisi
- Location: (Nigeria) Aba, Abia State, Nigeria
- Campus: Urban
- Nickname: Great Eagles
- Website: tgp.edu.ng

Temple Gate Polytechnic is a private Nigerian tertiary institution that was established in 2005 and accredited by the National Board for Technical Education in 2009. The polytechnic is located in Aba, Abia State and it offers National Diploma and Higher Diploma courses in undergraduate levels.

== See also ==
- List of polytechnics in Nigeria
