= Shaka Polytechnic =

Private tertiary institution in Benin City, Nigeria

Location
- Shaka Polytechnic, Avbiama, Benin City 300104, Edo; Benin, Edo; Nigeria
- 6.3395°N 5.6520°E

Information
- Former name: Nigeria Institute of Computer Science
- School type: Private owned Polytechnic
- Established: 6 February 1986
- Founder: Late Donaldson Shaka Momodu
- Website: https://shakapoly.edu.ng/programme/

Shaka Polytechnic in Benin City, Nigeria, is a privately owned tertiary institution which was established on 6 February 1986 as the Nigerian Institute of Computer Science.

== Background ==
The school was founded by Late Donaldson Shaka Momodu. It has its main campus at Evbo-Ewedo, Egba Way, along Benin-Auchi Road and the first campus at 1, Prince Shaka Momodu Street, Ogiso Quarters, Benin City. The institution became accredited as a Polytechnic by the National Board for Technical Education (NBTE) in 2013. The polytechnic is under the leadership of Henrietta Shaka Momodu.

== Academic programmes ==
The institution runs four schools/faculties with a total of nine academic programmes for the award of National Diploma(ND) and Higher National Diploma(HND);

School of Business and Management

- Accountancy
- Business Administration and Management
- Marketing
- Mass Communication

School of Applied Science

- Computer Science
- Statistics

School of Engineering

- Electrical/Electronics Engineering
- Computer Engineering

School of Environmental Science

- Estate Management

== See also ==
- List of Polytechnics in Nigeria
