= Isa Mustapha Agwai I Polytechnic =

Tertiary institution in Lafia, Nigeria

- Former names: Nasarawa State Polytechnic, Lafia (2000–2019)
- Type: Public Polytechnic
- Established: 15 August 2000
- Rector: Dr. Nurudeen Mu’azu Maifata (Acting)
- Location: Lafia, Nasarawa State, Nigeria
- Campus: Urban (Jos Road, Lafia)
- Affiliations: National Board for Technical Education
- Website: imap.edu.ng

Isa Mustapha Agwai I Polytechnic (IMAP) is a state owned tertiary institution in Lafia, Nasarawa state, Nigeria. It was established on 15 August 2000 as the Nasarawa state polytechnic, Lafia by former governor of Nassarawa state, Abdullahi Adamu. Dr. Nuruddeen Mu'azu Maifata is the rector of the installation.

In 2019, the institution was renamed in honour of the late Emir of Lafia, Alhaji Isa Mustapha Agwai I (1935–2019). The main campus is located along Jos Road, about 5 kilometres from Lafia town.

== Academics ==
The polytechnic consists of five schools: Business and Management Studies, Applied Sciences, Engineering Technology, Environmental Studies, and General Studies. It offers National Diploma (ND), Higher National Diploma (HND), and other remedial and consultancy programmes.

== Library ==
The library, established in 2001, contains over 30,000 volumes and an e-library with ICT facilities.

== See also ==
- List of polytechnics in Nigeria
