= Heritage Polytechnic =

Location
- Eket; Nigeria
- 4.6567°N 7.9759°E

Information
- Type: Privately owned polytechnic institute
- Faculty: Engineering Science and Technology Environmental Science Management Sciences
- Color: green
- Website: http://www.heritagepoly.edu.ng
- Accredited

Heritage Polytechnic, Eket, Akwa Ibom state, is a privately owned polytechnic institute located in Ikot Udota, Eket local Government Area of Akwa Ibom State, Nigeria.

== Background ==
The institution founded by Emmanuel J. Ekott who is a Chemical Engineer took off in 1996 as Christian Continuing Education Centre. By 1999, it metamorphosed to Christian Institute of Continuing Education. In 2000, the institution became known as Heritage College and it was licensed by the National Board for Technical Education as a Polytechnic in 2010.

== Courses ==
The institution has four Faculties and runs their programmes under these departments;

Faculty of Engineering

- Department of Computer Engineering
- Department of Electrical and Electronic Engineering

Faculty of Environmental Studies

- Department of Estate Management
- Department of Quantity Surveying
- Department of Building Technology

Faculty of Management Sciences

- Department of Mass Communication
- Department of Business Administration and Management
- Department of Accountancy
- Department of Marketing
- Department of Public Administration
- Department of Theology

Faculty of Science and Technology

- Department of Computer Science
- Department of Science Laboratory Technology
- Department of Statistics
- Department of Biochemistry
- Department of Environmental Biology
- Department of Microbiology
- Department of Physics and Electronics

== See also ==
List of Polytechnics in Nigeria
