= Lagos City Polytechnic =

Private Polytechnic in Nigeria

- Type: Private
- Established: 1990
- Accreditation: National Board for Technical Education
- Location: Ikeja, Lagos state, Nigeria
- Website: https://lagoscitypolytechnic.edu.ng/

Lagos City Polytechnic is a privately owned polytechnic in Ikeja, Lagos, Nigeria. It provides National Diploma courses in Accountancy, Banking & Finance and Business Studies. The Lagos City Computer College is affiliated with the polytechnic.

The polytechnic is recognized by the National Board for Technical Education.

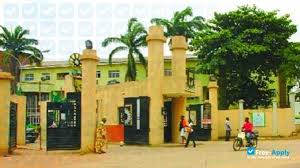

The polytechnic was established in 1990 by Engineer Babatunde Odufuwa as the first private tertiary educational institution in Nigeria. It gained official recognition in 1995. In December 2002 the polytechnic held its second convocation ceremony, where about 300 students received Higher Diplomas or National Diplomas. The institution was criticized in 2006 by a Sunday Sun reporter who found lax admission procedures and inadequate staff.

== See also ==
- List of polytechnics in Nigeria
