= Suleiman Dikko =

Chief Judge of Nasarawa State, Nigeria

Suleiman Dikko (born 31 December 1955) is a Nigerian lawyer who is the current Chief Judge of Nasarawa State.

In 2019, Dikko threatened to dismiss judges who arrive late in court for case hearings. He also warned the Nigerian Police that he would stop signing arrest warrants to the police for delayed prosecution of crime suspects already remanded in prison.

In February 2019, the Judiciary Staff Union of Nigeria (JUSUN) called for Dikko to be removed from his position as Chief Judge for illegal deductions from judiciary workers’ salaries. Later that month, Dikko was prevented from gaining access to his office for hours before eventual being allowed access to his office after pleading with protesting judiciary workers.

In May 2020, Dikko granted pardons to 20 inmates in Nasarawa State in a move to decongest prisons.

== Career ==
Dikko was called to the Nigerian Bar in October 1986. He was appointed a Judge of the High Court in Lafia, Nasarawa State in April 1986, presiding over High Court No.1.
