= Kings Polytechnic =

Private polytechnic in Nigeria

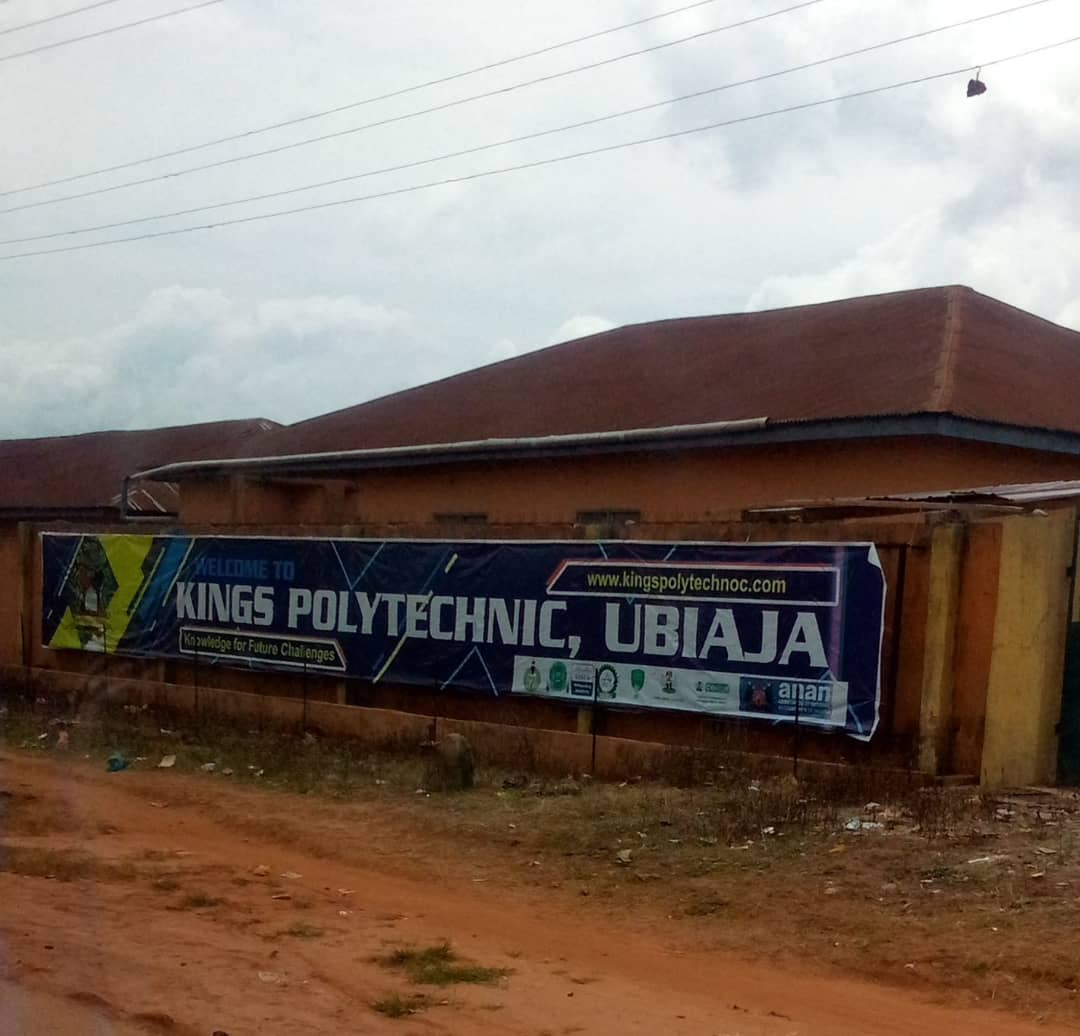
Kings Polytechnic, Ubiaja

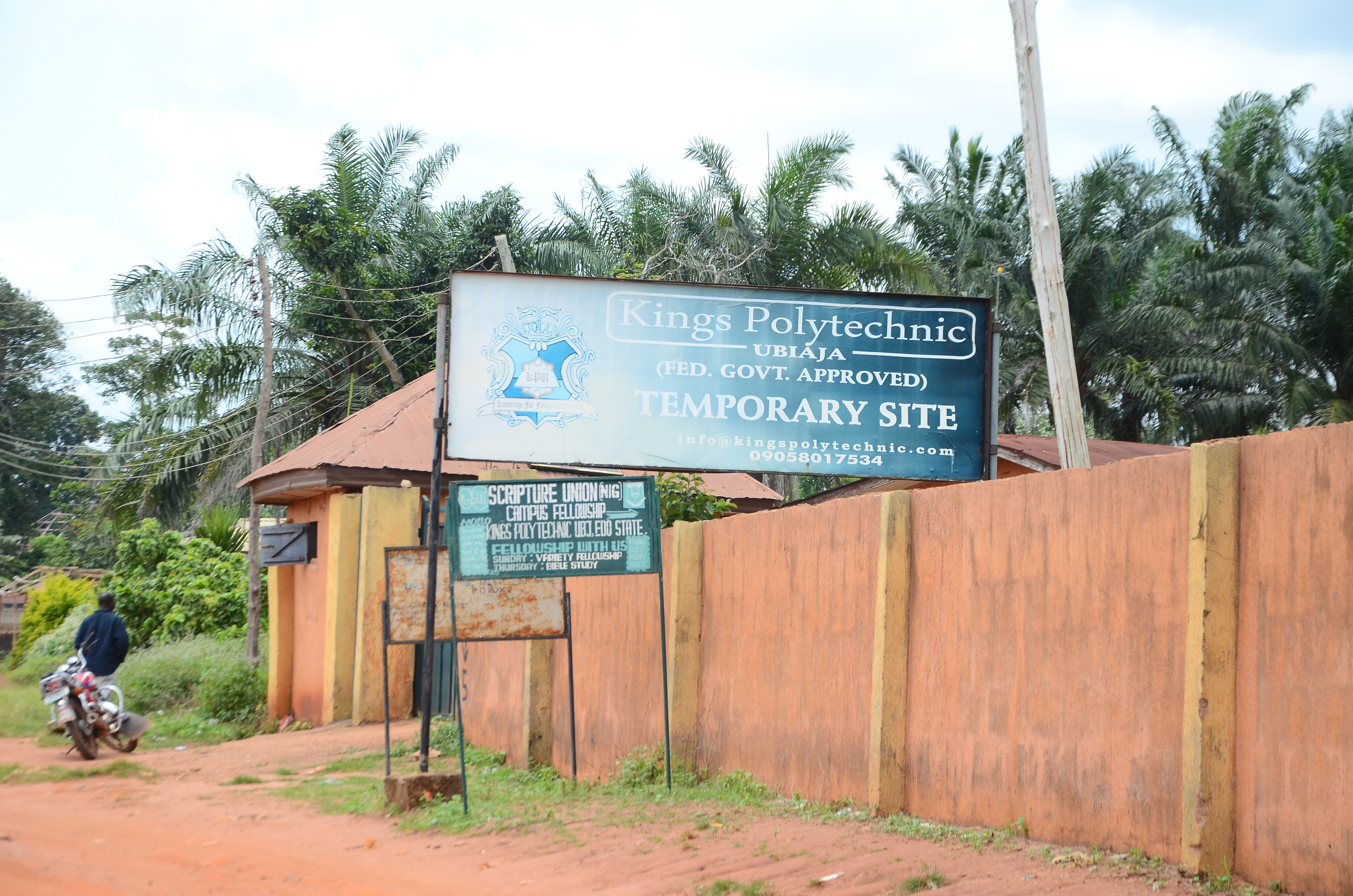
Kings Polytechnic

Kings Polytechnic is a private polytechnic in Ubiaja, Nigeria.

== History ==
It is an offspring of the new Era Institute of Technology, Ubiaja, which was established in 2005. The desire for the change from an institute to a polytechnic was a result of the foresight of the proprietor, Chief Sir Francis Anegbode Ijewere, a retired chief of banking operations of the Central Bank of Nigeria. He saw in a polytechnic greater opportunity in the areas of technology and skills acquisition than an institute, especially in the sidelined zone, like Esan South East local government area of Edo State, in opportunities for tertiary education.

Pursuant to this change, he followed the due process of establishing a private polytechnic, by applying to the National Board for Technical Education, the statutory body set up by the Federal Government to manage and control all matters relating to polytechnic education in Nigeria. In response to the application, the NBTE gave him a printed document on "Guidelines and Procedure for the Establishment of Private Polytechnics, Monotechnics and Similar Tertiary Institutions in Nigeria".

Following the guidelines, the proprietor put in place a temporary site. He obtained all the needed resources (structures, equipment, and staffs both academic and non-academic), and acquired over 50 hectares of land for the permanent site. He thereafter invited the NBTE for advisory/approval invitation, which took place in April 2007.

The polytechnic was given approval by the Hon. Minister of Education, to commence business with effect from January 29, 2010.

== Programs ==
- School of Engineering and Applied Sciences
- School of Business and Management Studies
- School of Environmental Studies

== Courses ==
The institution offers the following courses;

- Accountancy
- Architectural Technology
- Building Technology
- Business Administration and Management
- Agricultural Engineering/Technology
- Electrical/Electronics Engineering
- Estate Management
- Mass Communication
- Quantity Surveying
- Science Laboratory Technology

== See also ==
- List of Polytechnics in Nigeria
