= Federal Polytechnic, Kaura-Namoda =

- Type: Public
- Established: June 1983
- Accreditation: National Board for Technical Education
- Location: Kaura-Namoda, Zamfara State, Nigeria
- Website: https://fedponam.edu.ng/

The Federal Polytechnic, Namoda is based in Kaura-Namoda, Zamfara State, Nigeria. It was founded in June 1983 by President Shehu Shagari, and has over 5,000 students. The Polytechnic is accredited by the National Board for Technical Education. It provides full-time and part-time courses in Technology, Applied Science, Commerce and Management, leading to National Diplomas and Higher National Diplomas. The Polytechnic is the only tertiary educational Institution in the town of 300,000. Currently it has more than 500,000 students. In November 2009, the Africa Youths International Development Foundation signed a memorandum of understanding to provide financial support to upgrade the facilities. The current rector is Dr Yahaya Muhammad Bande. The federal polytechnic Kaura Namoda has 41 years of establishment.

== See also ==
- List of polytechnics in Nigeria
- Education in Nigeria
