= Sidi Bage =

Emir of Lafia

Emir of Lafia, the Hon. Justice Sidi Dauda Bage

Judge of the High Court of Nigeria
- In office 9 November 1992 – 4 December 2016

Justice, Court of Appeal of Nigeria
- In office 10 December 2007 – 4 December 2016

Justice of the Supreme Court of Nigeria
- In office 5 December 2016 – 26 March 2019
- Appointed by: Muhammadu Buhari, President of Nigeria

Emir of Lafia
- Incumbent
- Assumed office 26 March 2019
- Appointed by: Umaru Tanko Al-Makura, Governor of Nassarawa State

Personal details
- Born: Sidi Duada Bage; 22 May 1956 (age 70) Lafia, Nassarawa State, Nigeria
- Occupation: Traditional ruler; Jurist (1992–2016)

Sidi Dauda Bage (born 22 May 1956), is a retired Nigerian jurist who presides as the 17th Emir of Lafia, a customary emirate in Nigeria. He succeeded the 16th emir, Isa Mustapha Agwai (r. 1974–2019), on 26 March 2019.

== Early life and education ==
Bage was born in Lafia, in Nigeria's Nassarawa State. He attended the local Dunoma Primary School before going to the government secondary school in Lafia, 1970–1974. His initial legal training was at the Ahmadu Bello University Zaria, where he obtained a diploma in law in 1977. He continued his legal education with an LLB Honours degree in 1980, before attending the Nigerian Law School Lagos. He was called to the bar in 1981.

== Legal career ==
Bage was appointed a Justice of the Supreme Court of Nigeria in 2016 by President Muhammadu Buhari.

== Emir ==
Bage was chosen as Lafia's ruler upon the death of Isa Mustapha Agwai I, on 10 January 2019 the 16th Emir of Lafia. This was done by its Emirate Council's traditional selectors, whose entitlement to do so is bestowed by custom, recognised in modern law; these "kingmakers" vote to select the traditional ruler in accordance with chieftaincy laws. Bage is from the Dalla Dunama (the 'Dalla ruling house') of the Kanuri, one of the two houses eligible for selection as emir in Lafia, in an accordance with a 1986 government regulation—the other house being the Ari Dunama, of which the 16th emir was a member. The Emir of Lafia is ranked eighth in Nigeria's order of precedence for traditional rulers.

As emir, Bage belongs to the Nassarawa State Council of Traditional Rulers and Chiefs and is its chairman. During Bage's reign as emir, he has been active in cultural affairs, including patronage of the Salah festival, and promotion of the Kanuri language. He has overseen the redesign of the emir's palace in Lafia. He is the chairman of the religious support society Jama'atu Nasril Islam in Benue-Plateau State. Bage was appointed sheikh and grand khalif for Nassarawa State of the Sufi tariqa, the Tijaniyyah order.

The president of Nigeria, Muhammadu Buhari recognised Bage with an award given for peaceful and orderly rule.

== See also ==
- List of Hausa people
- List of Nigerian traditional states
