= Federal Polytechnic Monguno =

Tertiary Institution in Nigeria

- Type: Public
- Established: 5 January 2021
- Location: Monguno, Borno, 612101, Nigeria; 12.6837°N 13.5870°E
- Campus: Rural
- Website: fedpolymonguno.edu.ng

Federal Polytechnic Monguno is a public polytechnic located in Monguno, Borno State, northeast Nigeria.

== Background ==
Federal Polytechnic Monguno was established in January 2021 by the Federal Government of Nigeria as the first federal polytechnic in Borno State. The establishment aimed to provide technical and vocational education in the region, addressing the lack of federal institutions in northeastern Nigeria. The polytechnic commenced with eight academic programs across three schools, offering courses in fields such as business administration, accountancy, agricultural science, and computer science.

== Library ==
The library has information resources that support teaching and learning in the institutions.

== See also ==
- List of polytechnics in Nigeria
