= Eastern Polytechnic, Port Harcourt =

Private polytechnic in River State, Nigeria

Eastern Polytechnic
- Motto: Where Tradition Meets Innovation
- Type: Private
- Established: 2008 (18 years ago)
- Founders: Dr. S. A. N. Egwu, JP
- Chairman: Prof. Jerry Agada
- Location: 34 Ogboroama Street, Port Harcourt, Rivers State, Nigeria
- Website: easternpolytechnic.org

Eastern Polytechnic is the first private polytechnic in Rivers State, Nigeria. It was established in 2008 and has its main campus in Rumuokwurusi, Port Harcourt. From the start, the institution has consistently relied on the ideals of innovation, entrepreneurship and commitment, to equip its students with the skills and knowledge to succeed in a wide range of careers. The current rector is Rev. Fr. Malachy Aguzuru C.S.Sp, who was ordained to the priesthood on 9 July 2005.

The establishment of Eastern Polytechnic was approved by the Federal Ministry of Education (FME). The institution is also accredited by the National Board for Technical Education.

== Courses ==
Eastern Polytechnic offers National diploma and higher National diploma courses at undergraduate levels. The general duration for the ND programme is two years. As of February 2016, courses accredited by the NBTE include:

- Accountancy
- Computer science
- Public administration
- Mass communication
- Computer engineering and Technology
- Business administration and management
- Electrical/Electronic engineering

== Governing Council ==
The institution has a governing council comprising a chairman and members appointed by the proprietor to serve for a period of two years. They may be renominated or reappointed but may not serve more than two terms.
