= Federal Polytechnic, Idah =

Polytechnic in Idah, Kogi State, Nigeria

- Motto: Technology for Self Reliance
- Type: Public
- Established: 1977
- Affiliations: National Board for Technical Education
- Rector: David Baba D, PhD
- Location: (Nigeria) Idah, Kogi State, Nigeria; 7.1425°N 6.7914°E
- Campus: Urban
- Language: English
- Website: fepoda.edu.ng

The Federal Polytechnic Idah, formerly Idah College of Technology, is a federal government-owned tertiary institution established in 1977 in Idah, Kogi State. It is approved by the National Board for Technical Education and it also offers National Diploma and Higher National Diploma courses at undergraduate levels with the aim of “training competitive manpower for development”.

== Schools ==
- The Polytechnic now has 50 academic programmes, twenty-five (25) departments constituted into five schools viz:
- School of Business Studies
- School of Engineering
- School of Environmental Studies
- School of Technology
- Administrative and General Studies

== Available Courses ==
The available list of courses offered by Federal Polytechnic Idah include:

1. ACCOUNTANCY
2. ARCHITECTURAL TECHNOLOGY
3. BUILDING TECHNOLOGY
4. BUSINESS ADMINISTRATION & MANAGEMENT
5. CIVIL ENGINEERING TECHNOLOGY
6. COMPUTER SCIENCE
7. ELECTRICAL/ELECTRONIC ENGINEERING TECHNOLOGY
8. ESTATE MANAGEMENT AND VALUATION
9. FOOD TECHNOLOGY
10. FOUNDRY ENGINEERING TECHNOLOGY
11. HOSPITALITY MANAGEMENT
12. LEISURE AND TOURISM MANAGEMENT
13. LIBRARY AND INFORMATION SCIENCE
14. MARKETING
15. MECHANICAL ENGINEERING TECHNOLOGY
16. METALLURGICAL ENGINEERING TECHNOLOGY
17. OFFICE TECHNOLOGY AND MANAGEMENT
18. PUBLIC ADMINISTRATION
19. QUANTITY SURVEYING
20. SCIENCE LABORATORY TECHNOLOGY
21. STATISTICS
22. SURVEYING AND GEO-INFORMATICS
23. URBAN AND REGIONAL PLANNING

== See also ==
- List of polytechnics in Nigeria
