= Mai-Idris Alooma Polytechnic =

Higher education institution in Geidam, Yobe, Nigeria

Mai Idris Alooma Polytechnic
- Type: Public
- Established: 2003
- Rector: Dr Wakil Gana Kafiya PhD
- Location: Geidam, Yobe State, Nigeria
- Website: Official website

The Mai Idris Alooma Polytechnic is a state government higher education institution located in Geidam, Yobe State, Nigeria. The current rector is Dr Wakil Gana Kafiya PhD.

== History ==
The Mai Idris Alooma Polytechnic was established in 2003.

== Courses ==
The institution offers the following courses;

- Science Laboratory Technology
- Computer Science
- Statistics
- Architectural Technology
- Electrical/Electronic Engineering Technology
- Accountancy
- Business Administration And Management
