= Ejigbo, Lagos =

Suburb of Lagos, Nigeria

Coordinates: 6.552°N 3.307°E

Ejigbo-Lagos is a suburb of the city of Lagos, in Lagos State, Nigeria a Local Council Development Area (LCDA) within the Oshodi-Isolo local government area. In 2009, the Executive Chairman was the Hon. Kehinde Bamigbetan. The newly elected Chairman of Ejigbo LCDA is Hon. Monsuru Oloyede Bello (Obe). He was elected in July 2017.

== Wards ==
There are six (6) wards in Ejigbo LCDA:

- Aigbaka
- Ailegun
- Fadu
- Ifoshi
- Ilamose
- Oke-Afa
