= Federal Polytechnic, Bauchi =

Tertiary Institution in Nigeria

Federal Polytechnic Bauchi
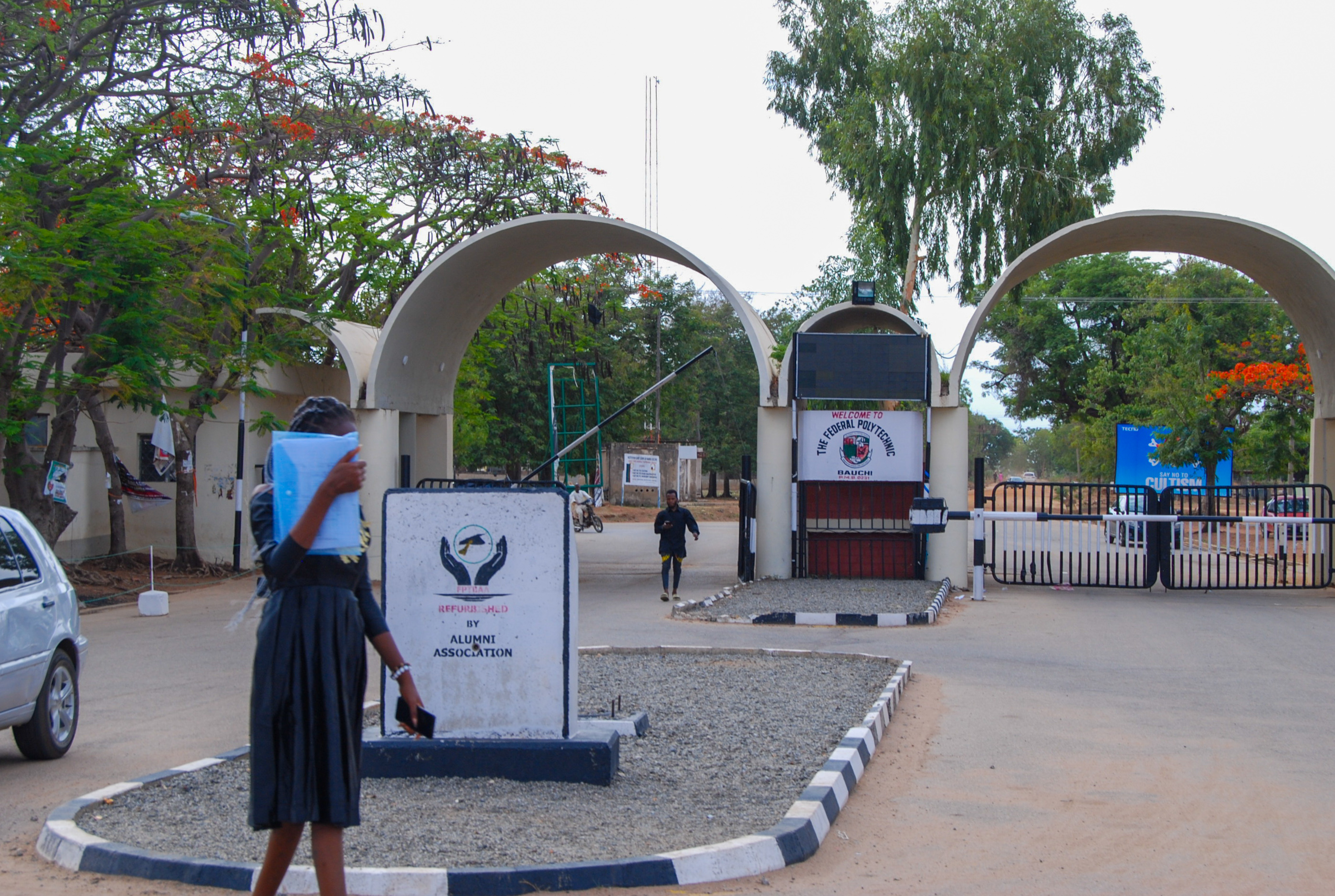
- Federal Polytechnic Bauchi Main Gate
- Motto: manufarmur gwanan cewa cikin sana’oi
- Type: Polytechnic
- Established: July 1979
- Rector: Alh. Sani Usman
- Location: Bauchi, Bauchi Town, Bauchi State, Nigeria; 10.257°N 9.768°E
- Campus: Urban
- Colors: Red, Green and Gray.
- Website: fptb.edu.ng

Federal Polytechnic, Bauchi is a polytechnic located in Bauchi, a traditional emirate and the capital of Bauchi State, North-East of Nigeria.

== Background ==
Federal Polytechnic Bauchi was established in July 1979 through Decree 33(Act 33) of the Federal Republic of Nigeria alongside six other institutions with a mandate to run full-time and/or part-time programmes on Technology, Applied Science, Commerce, Management and in other relevant fields needed for driving the development of Nigeria. It is situated at Gwallameji village, Bauchi - Dass Road. The current Rector of the polytechnic is Alh. Sani Usman. The institutions which offers programmes leading to the award of National Diploma and Higher National Diploma was granted approval in 2020 to run nine degree courses in affiliation with Abubakar Tafewa Balewa University, Bauchi.

== Courses ==
The institution offers the following courses;

- Accountancy
- Agricultural and Environmental Engineering Technology
- Agricultural Technology
- Animal Health and Production Technology
- Architectural Technology
- Banking and Finance
- Building Technology
- Business Administration and Management
- Chemical Engineering Technology
- Computer Science
- Electrical/Electronic Engineering
- Estate Management and Valuation
- Food Technology
- Hospitality Management
- Leisure and Tourism Management
- Mass Communication
- Mechanical Engineering Technology
- Office Technology and Management
- Public Administration
- Quantity Surveying
- Science Laboratory Technology
- Statistics
- Surveying and Geo-informatics

== See also ==
- List of Polytechnics in Nigeria
