= Lafia =

Capital city of Nasarawa State, Nigeria

Lafia Lafiyan
- LGA and city
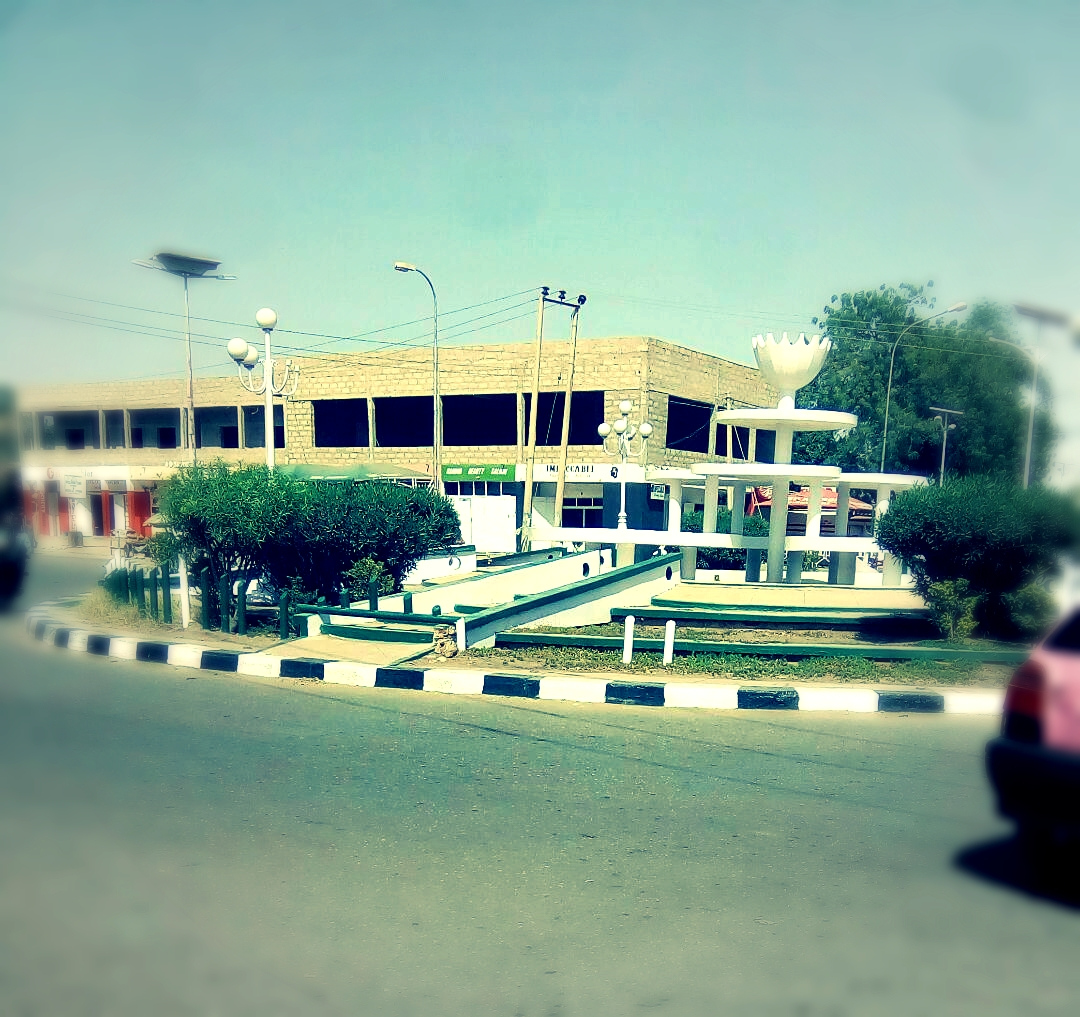
- Nickname: Lafia Garin Madidi
- Location within Nigeria
- Coordinates: 8°29′30″N 8°31′0″E
- Country: Nigeria
- State: Nasarawa

Government
  - Emir: Hon. Justice Sidi Bage Muhammad I JSC Rtd.
  - LGA Chairman: Alh. Muhammad Halliru arabo

Area
  - Total: 2,827 km^{2} (1,092 sq mi)

Population (2022 est)
  - Total: 509,300
  - Density: 180.2/km^{2} (466.6/sq mi)
- Time zone: UTC1 (WAT)
- Climate: Aw

Lafia is a city in Nigeria's North Central region. It is the capital and largest city of Nasarawa State, with a population of 509,300 inhabitants as of the 2021 census. It is the headquarters of the Lafia Emirate Council.

== History ==
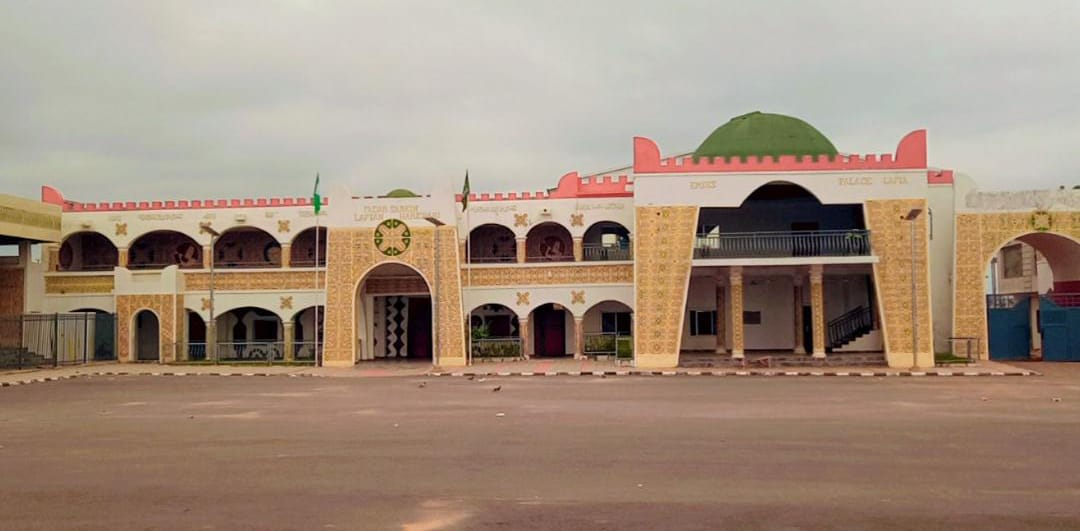
Lafia Emir's Palace

Lafia, also known as Lafian bare-bari, is the capital city of Nasarawa State, North Central Nigeria. Founded by Muhammadu Dunama in late 18th century on the site south of Shabu village. The town now has its 17th Emir in the person of Hon. Justice Sidi Bage Muhammad I JSC rtd. Lafia became the capital of a prominent local chiefdom in the late 19th century. During the rule of Mohamman Agwai (1881–1903), the Lafia market became one of the most important in the Benue Valley, and a trade route was opened to Loko (56 mi [90 km] southwest), a Benue River port. In 1903, the British, who controlled Northern Nigeria recognized Chief Musa as Lafia's first emir. The emirate formed the major part of the Lafia Division of Benue province. In 1967, the town became part of Benue-Plateau state, and in 1976, it was allocated to Plateau state. The original inhabitants of Lafia are mainly by the Kanuri, Fulani Gwandara, Alago, Migilli (Koro). It also has large populations of Hausa. This is due to the hospitable nature of the indigenes and has made the city a miniature Nigeria.

Modern Lafia aside from being an administrative and educational centre, it is also a collecting point for sesame seeds, soybeans, and is a trading centre for yams, sorghum, millet, and cotton. Besides farming, cotton weaving and dyeing are traditionally important activities of the town's inhabitants. Livestock farming is also a prominent activity especially amongst the Fulani herdsmen.

The two royal families of Ari and Dallah Dunama of the Kanuri people (Bare-Bari) are the ruling houses of the Lafia Emirate. The current Emir is Sidi Bage, from the Dallah Dunama royal family. He succeeded the longest reigning Emir, HRH Isa Mustapha Agwai I (1976–2019).

== Lafia Central Mosque ==
The Lafia Central Mosque (Arabic: النصراوا لافيا), also known as the Nasarawa State Mosque, is the state mosque of Nasarawa. The mosque was built in 1971 and is open to the non-Muslim public, except during congregational prayers.

== Institutions ==
Lafia is home to the Federal University of Lafia, Nasarawa State University Faculty of Agriculture Lafia Campus, Isa Mustapha Agwai I Polytechnic Lafia, School of Nursing And Midwifery, School of Health Technology LAFIA, College of Agriculture Lafia, and a study centre of the National Open University of Nigeria. It has a large number of primary and secondary schools. The St Williams Cathedral, situated along Jos Road, is the headquarters of the Lafia diocese and still under construction.

It is situated on the trunk railway from Port Harcourt and on the main highway between Makurdi and Jos. The population per the 2006 census in Lafia local government area was estimated as 330,712.

== Climate ==
Lafia has hot, humid, partly cloudy dry seasons, oppressive, overcast rainy seasons, with temperatures that range from 18 °C (64 °F) to 36 °C (97 °F) all year round. It rarely gets below 15 °C (59 °F) or rises over 39 °C (103 °F).

Climate data for Lafia (1991–2020)
Month	Jan	Feb	Mar	Apr	May	Jun	Jul	Aug	Sep	Oct	Nov	Dec	Year
Record high °C (°F)	40 (104)	42 (108)	42.2 (108.0)	42 (108)	40 (104)	36.8 (98.2)	34.5 (94.1)	41 (106)	35 (95)	37 (99)	40 (104)	39 (102)	42.2 (108.0)
Mean daily maximum °C (°F)	35.6 (96.1)	37.6 (99.7)	38.2 (100.8)	36.2 (97.2)	33.5 (92.3)	31.6 (88.9)	30.6 (87.1)	30.0 (86.0)	30.8 (87.4)	32.4 (90.3)	35.2 (95.4)	35.6 (96.1)	33.9 (93.0)
Daily mean °C (°F)	27.3 (81.1)	30.1 (86.2)	32.0 (89.6)	30.9 (87.6)	29.0 (84.2)	27.6 (81.7)	26.9 (80.4)	26.5 (79.7)	26.8 (80.2)	27.8 (82.0)	28.1 (82.6)	26.8 (80.2)	28.3 (82.9)
Mean daily minimum °C (°F)	19.0 (66.2)	22.6 (72.7)	25.8 (78.4)	25.7 (78.3)	24.5 (76.1)	23.5 (74.3)	23.2 (73.8)	23.0 (73.4)	22.9 (73.2)	23.2 (73.8)	21.0 (69.8)	18.0 (64.4)	22.7 (72.9)
Record low °C (°F)	11 (52)	10.8 (51.4)	15 (59)	18 (64)	17 (63)	16 (61)	19.7 (67.5)	18.2 (64.8)	19 (66)	17 (63)	13.5 (56.3)	10.5 (50.9)	10.5 (50.9)
Average precipitation mm (inches)	1.6 (0.06)	4.8 (0.19)	12.4 (0.49)	87.2 (3.43)	157.1 (6.19)	214.8 (8.46)	239.1 (9.41)	309.0 (12.17)	235.7 (9.28)	143.6 (5.65)	5.1 (0.20)	0.1 (0.00)	1,410.4 (55.53)
Average precipitation days (≥ 1.0 mm)	0.1	0.3	0.8	4.4	7.9	10.1	12.1	14.4	13.4	8.0	0.5	0.0	72.1
Average relative humidity (%)	37.4	38.8	52.4	69.0	78.6	82.7	84.7	86.3	85.6	82.9	63.3	45.1	67.2
Source: NOAA

=== Temperature ===
From January through April, Lafia endures a hot season with daily highs typically exceeding 34 °C (94 °F). The hottest month is March, which averages highs of 36 °C (97 °F) and lows of 24 °C (75 °F). Highs below 30 °C (86 °F) are experienced for 4.0 months during the chilly season. The coldest month is December, which has highs of 32 °C (90 °F) and lows of 18 °C (65 °F).

=== Growing Period ===
In Lafia, the term "growing season" refers to the longest stretch of time of the year during which temperatures are not below freezing (0 °C, 32 °F). With a base of 10 °C (50 °F) and a top of 30 °C (86 °F), growing degree days are a measurement of yearly heat accumulation used to forecast plant and animal development.

Temperatures in Lafia are sufficiently warm year round that it is not entirely meaningful to discuss the growing season in these terms.

== Sports ==
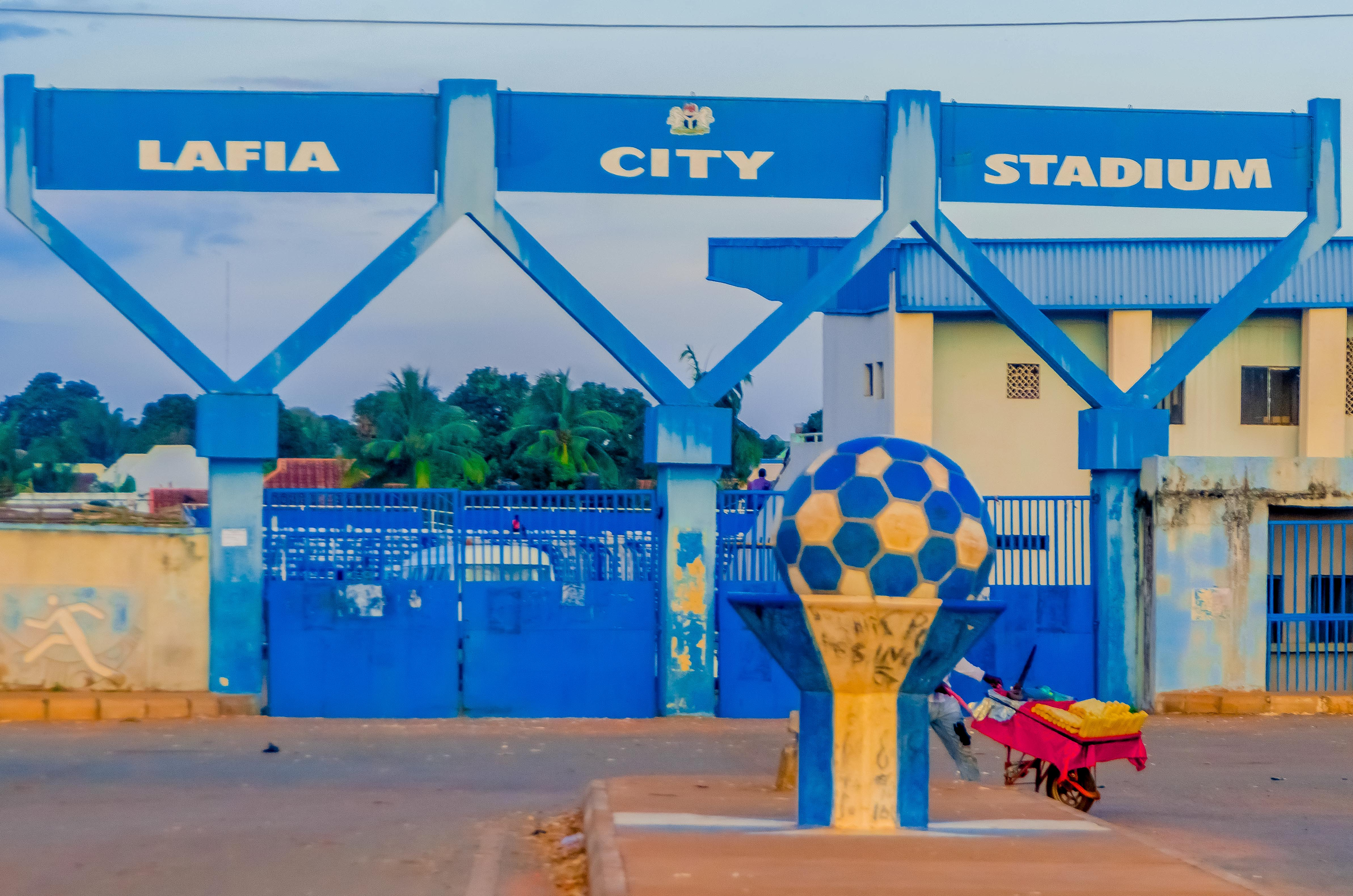
Lafia city stadium

Lafia is the location of Nasarawa United, a football club whose stadium is Lafia Township Stadium.

== Transportation ==
Lafia is served by the main narrow gauge railway from Port Harcourt.

== See also ==
- Railway stations in Nigeria
