= Bwari =

- City and local government area
- Interactive map of Bwari
- Country: Nigeria
- Territory: Federal Capital Territory

Area
  - Total: 1,031 km^{2} (398 sq mi)

Population (2022 est)
  - Total: 500,100
  - Density: 485.1/km^{2} (1,256/sq mi)
- Time zone: UTC+1 (WAT)

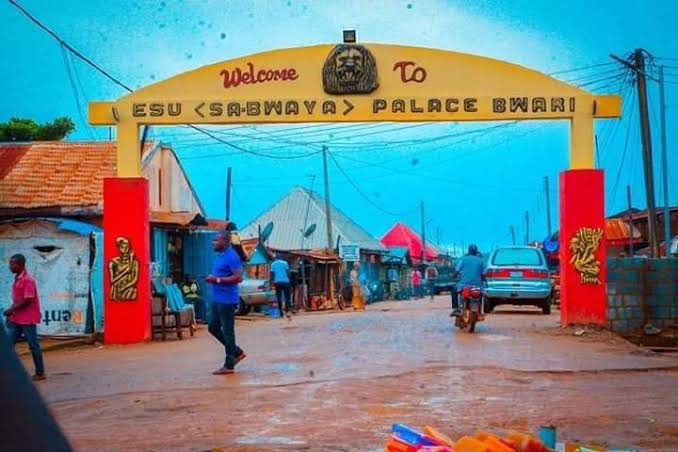
Esu Bwari Palace

Bwari is a city and local government area in the Federal Capital Territory in Nigeria. The original inhabitants of the town are the Gbagyi speaking people. The paramount ruler is the Esu who is otherwise known as Sa-bwaya. However, with the establishment of FCT in Abuja many changes occurred; including the turbaning of late Musa Ijakoro (of Koro ethnic minority, and from Suleja Emirate where parts of Abuja’s land was carved out) as District Head of Bwari in 1976, and his elevation as Sarki of Bwari to the position of a second class status in 1997 by the Ministry of the Federal Capital Territory under the then minister, General Jeremiah Useni.

Following the complaints and confrontation by the Gbagyis over the elevation of the Sarki’s stool to a second class status, the FCT administration then elevated the Esu’s stool to a third class position with the aim of calming the tension; but this did not pacify the Gbagyis as they claimed to be the majority and original inhabitants of the town. The Gbagyis have also claimed that there was an understanding that after the death of Ijakoro, the "Sarki of Bwari" position would cease to exist; but this did not happem, as his son, Muhammad Auwal Ijakoro took over as the new Sarki of Bwari after his demise.

On Christmas Day of 2017, there was communal clash between the Hausa [who majorly support the Sarki on religious grounds] and Gbagyi communities that engulfed the Bwari district of Abuja over same Chieftaincy dispute, in which two people were confirmed dead with properties including the Bwari Main Market burnt.

Bwari plays host to important institutions and public establishments such as:

- Bwari Area Council Secretariat.
- Bwari General Hospital.
- Nigerian Law School, Bwari.
- Joint Admission & Matriculation Board (JAMB) HQ's.
- JAMB UTME Computer-Based Testing Centre, Kogo.
- Dorben Polytechnic, Abuja(now operating from its permanent site in Garam, Niger State).
- Veritas [Catholic] University.

Politically, Bwari Area Council has at the helm of affairs an elected chairman with ten elected councilors representing the ten wards.

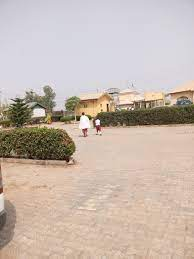
Bwari Medical Center

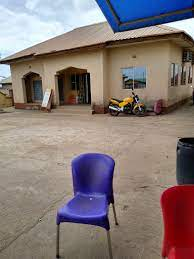
Bwari Post office

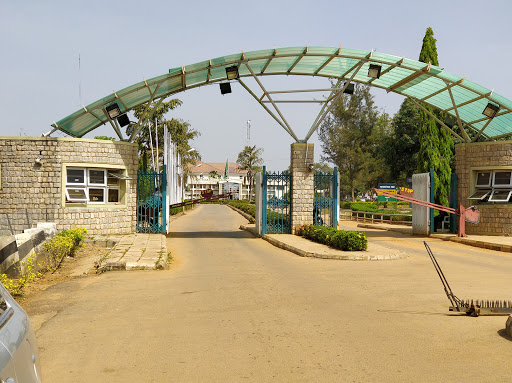
Bwari law school post office

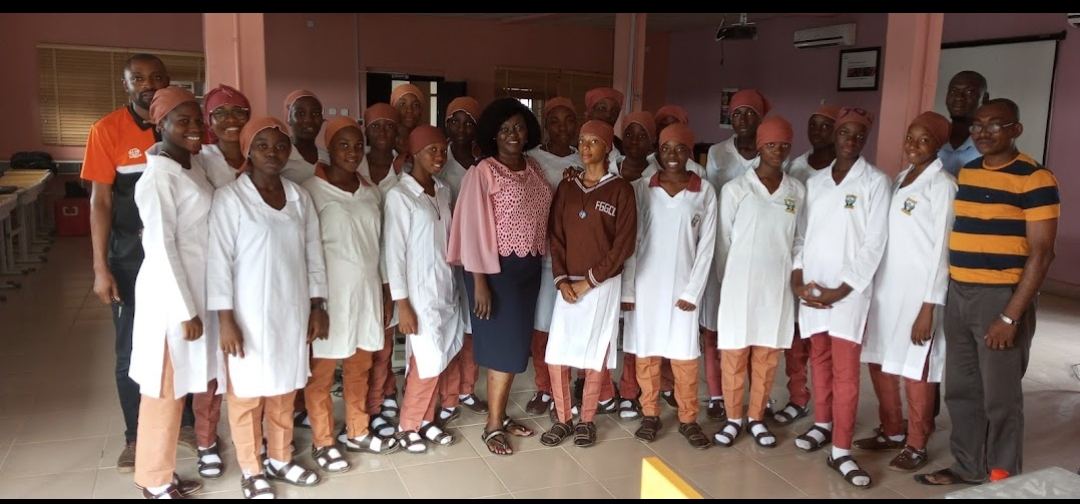
Federal Government Girls College Bwari

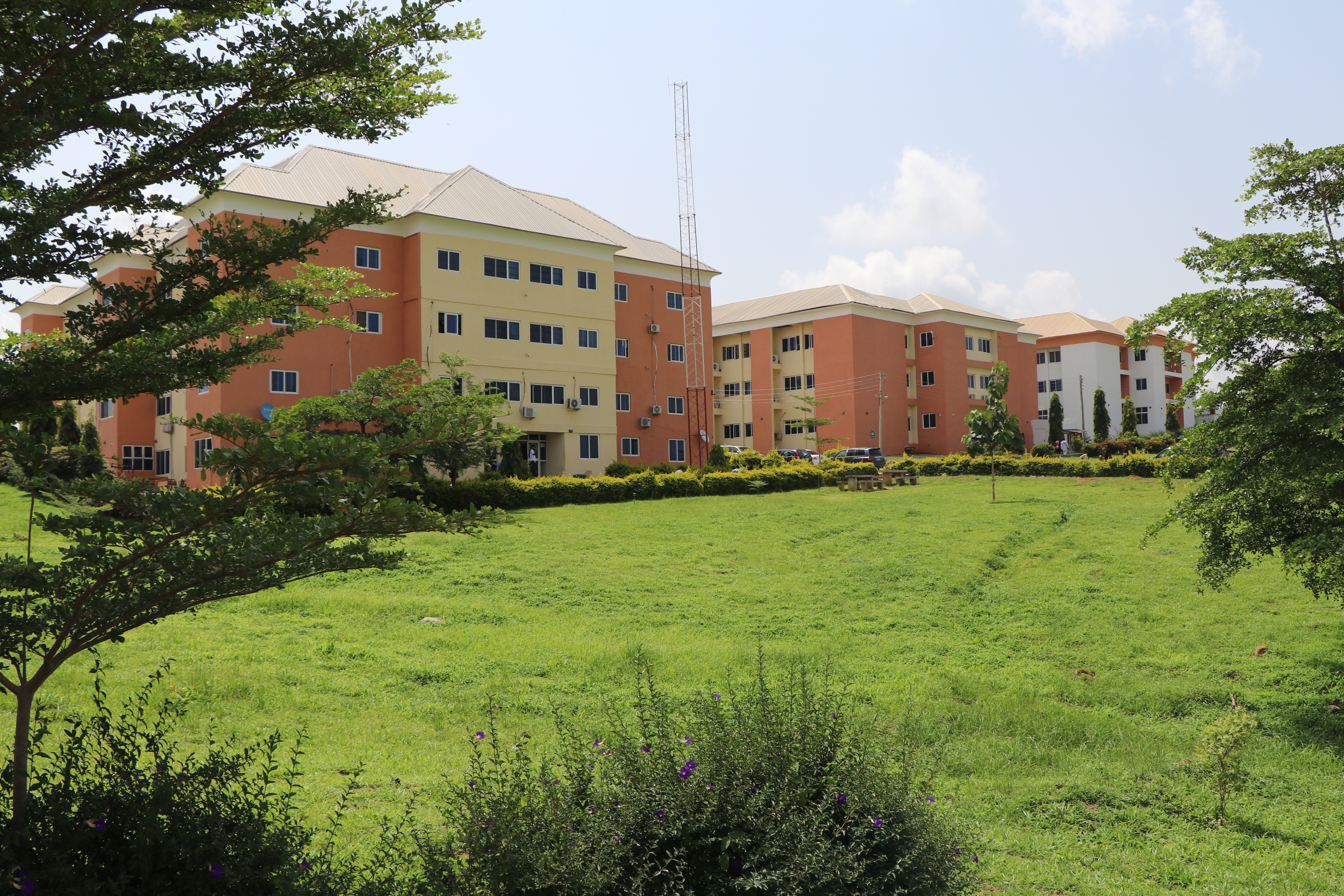
Veritas University. In Bwari

According to NIPOST's website, Bwari Area Council has the following towns/villages, with the Postcode 901101: Apugye, Barago, Baran Rafi, Barangoni, Barapa, Bazango Bwari, Bunko, Byazhi, Chikale, Dankoru, Dauda, Donabayi, Duba, Dutse Alhaji, Gaba, Galuwyi, Gidan Babachi, Gidan Baushe, Gidan Pawa, Gudupe, Gutpo, Igu, Jigo, Kaima, Karaku, Karawa, Kasaru, Katampe, Kawadashi, Kawu, Kikumi, Kimtaru, Kogo, Kubwa, Kuchibuyi, Kuduru, Kurumin Daudu, Kute, Kwabwure, Kuchikwo, Panda, Panunuki, Paspa, Payi, Piko, Piyawoyi, Rugan S/Fulani, Ruriji, Sabon Gari, Sagwari, Shere, Simape, Sumpe, Sabon Bwari, T/Danzaria, T/Manu, Tokulo, Tudun Wada, Tunga Bijimi, Tunga-Adoka, Tungan Sarkin, Ushafa, Yaba, Yajida, Yaupe, Yayidna, Zango, Zuma.

== History ==
Its history dates as far back as the seventeenth century when a Zaria-based hunter came to the area in the company of his family to hunt. Legend has it that at the time there existed a place known as Bwayape, (Bwari Hill) which means ‘pound here’. He had given his wife some millet. She asked him where she could pound it and he said, ‘pound here’; thus the origin of the name.

Bwaya later metamorphosed into the name Bwari. The four children of the hunter went swimming and were given the task of retrieving a precious object from the depth of the river. It turned out that it was the last of the four who succeeded at the task. However, because of his place in the family he could not ascend the throne and his elder brother Tayebebe was crowned instead followed by Dadadogunyi. That object is still a symbol in the turbanning process of the Bwari people.

== Climate ==
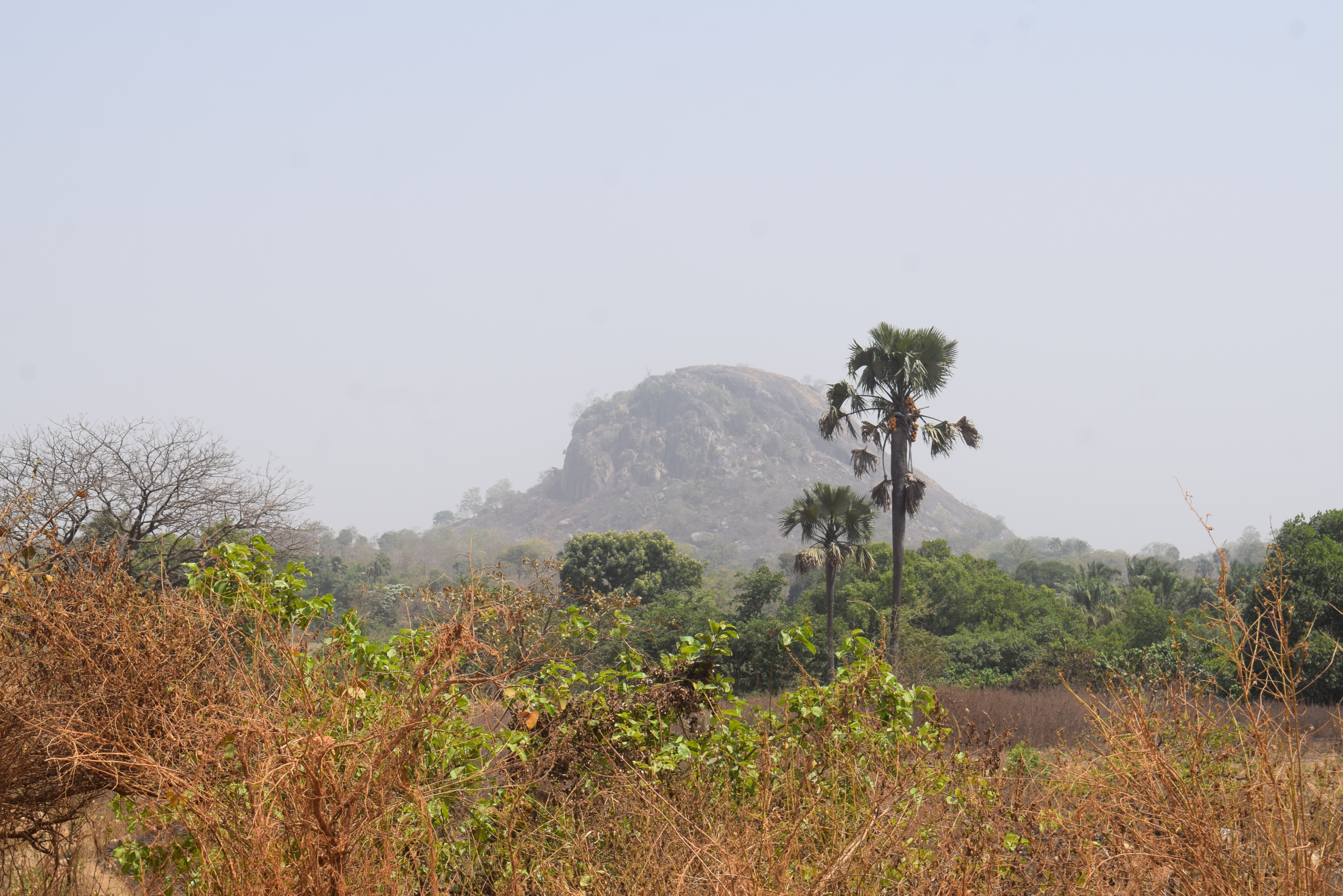
Tasha Bwari Hills

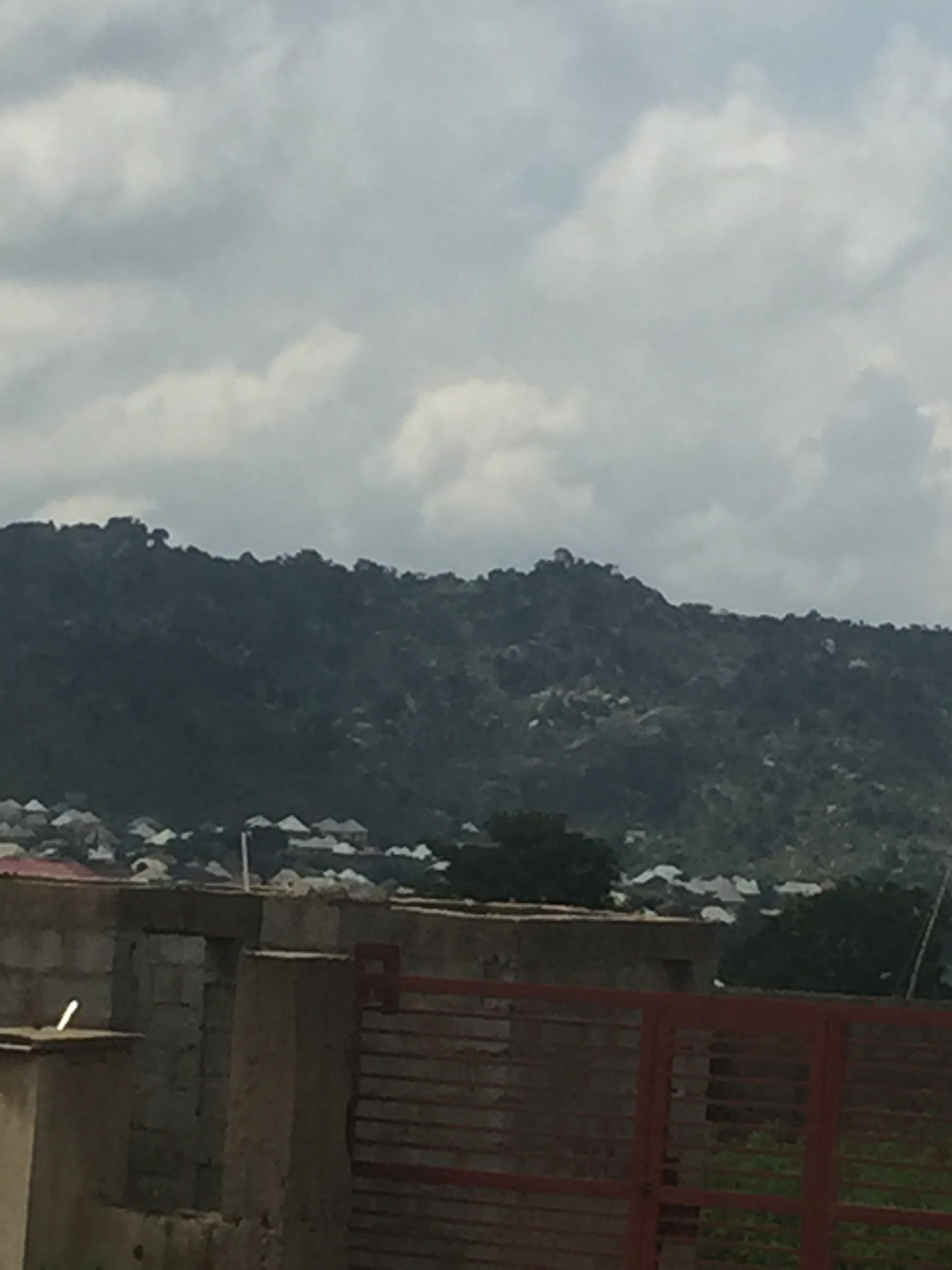
Rock in Bwari Local Government Area

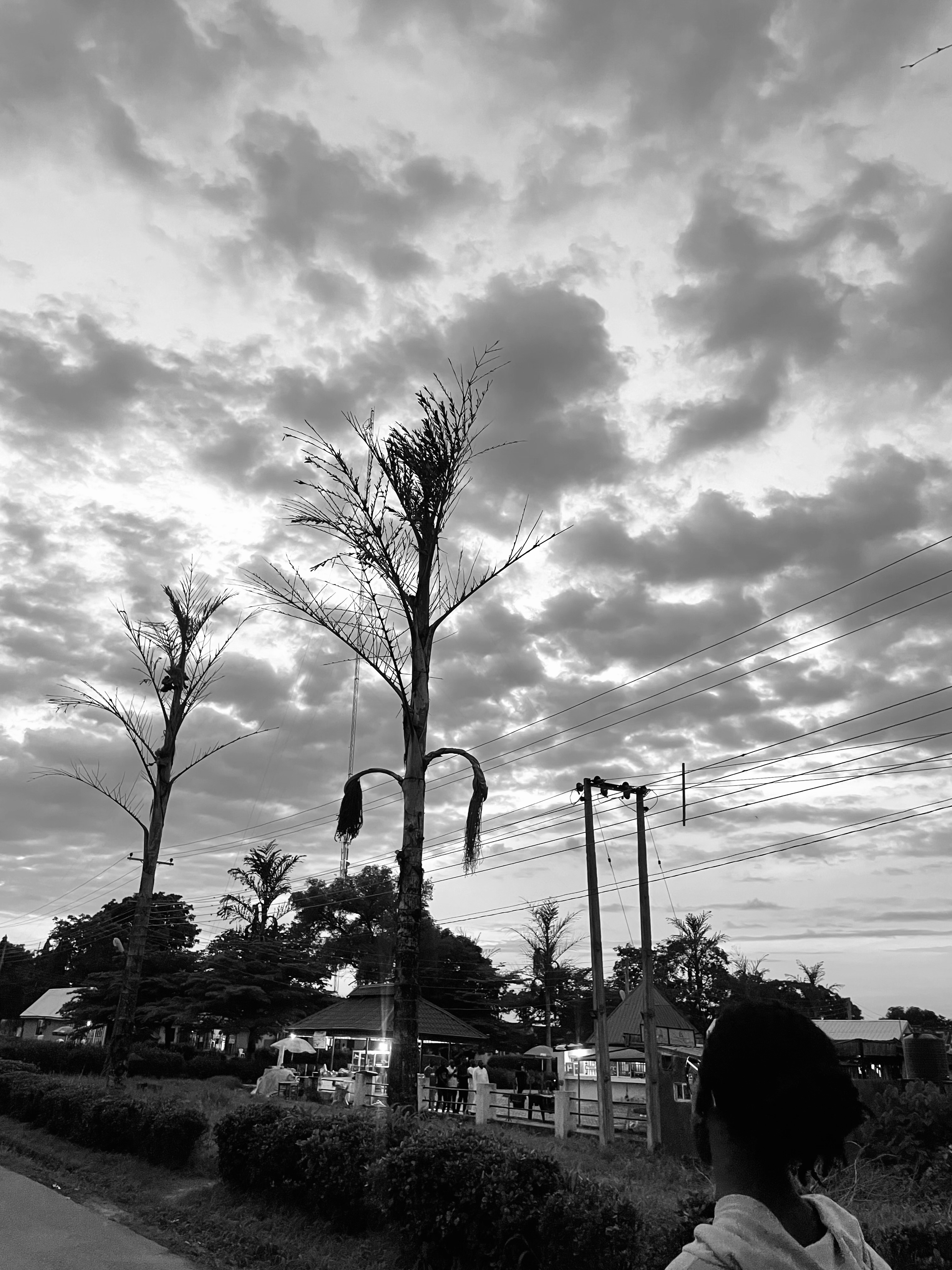
Climate of Bwari

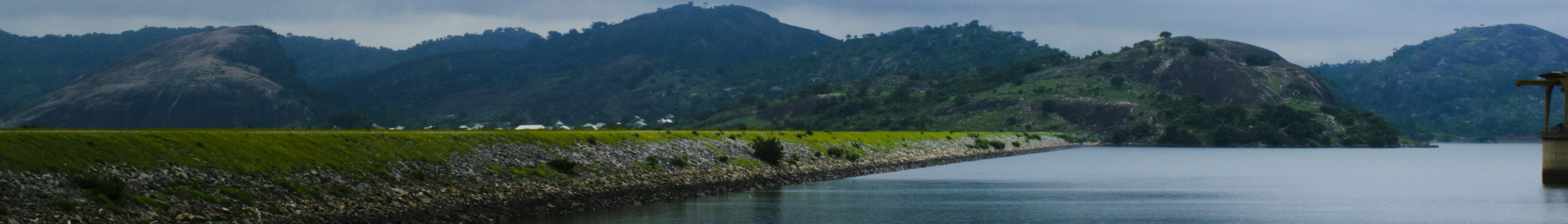
Bwari Local Government Area view

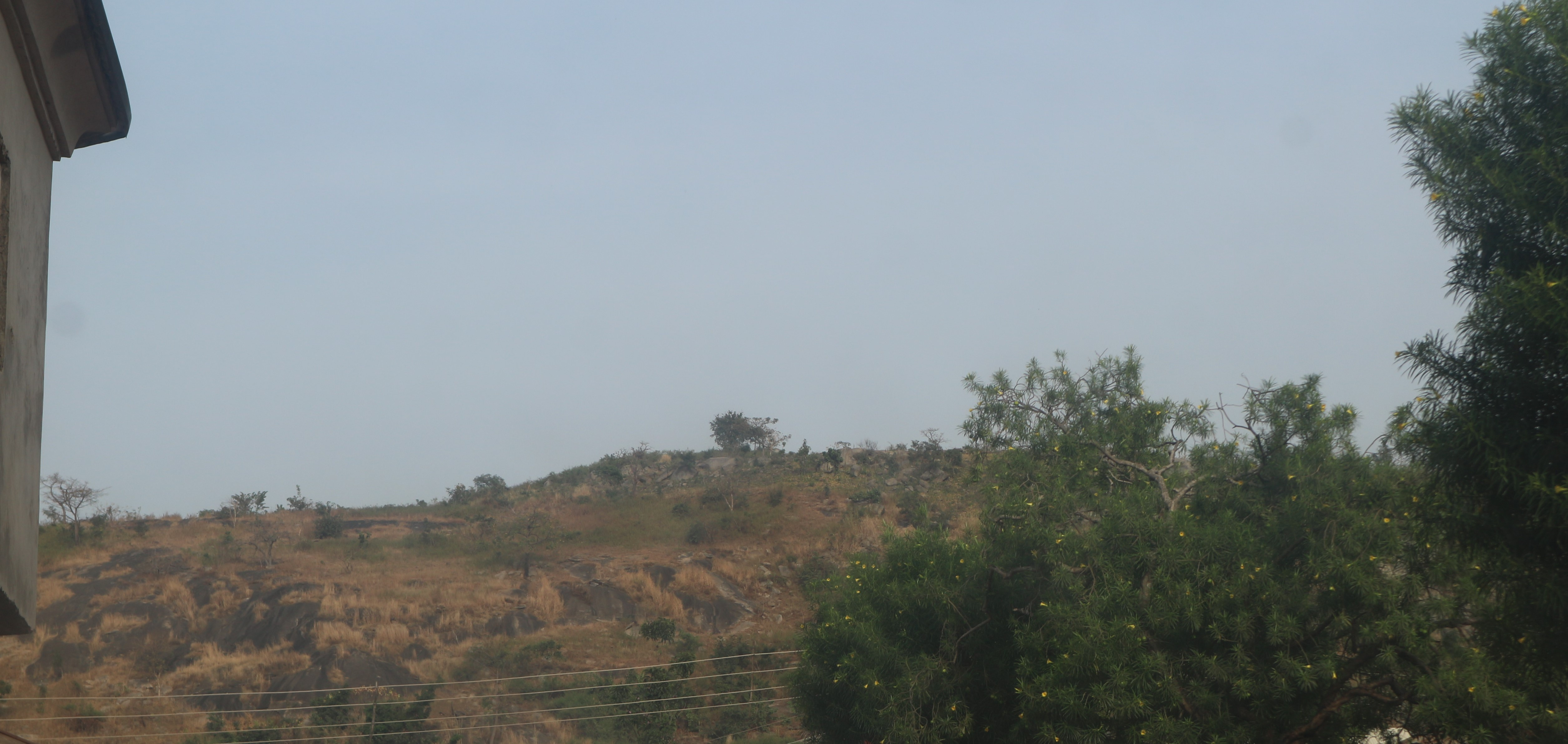
Bwari Mountain view

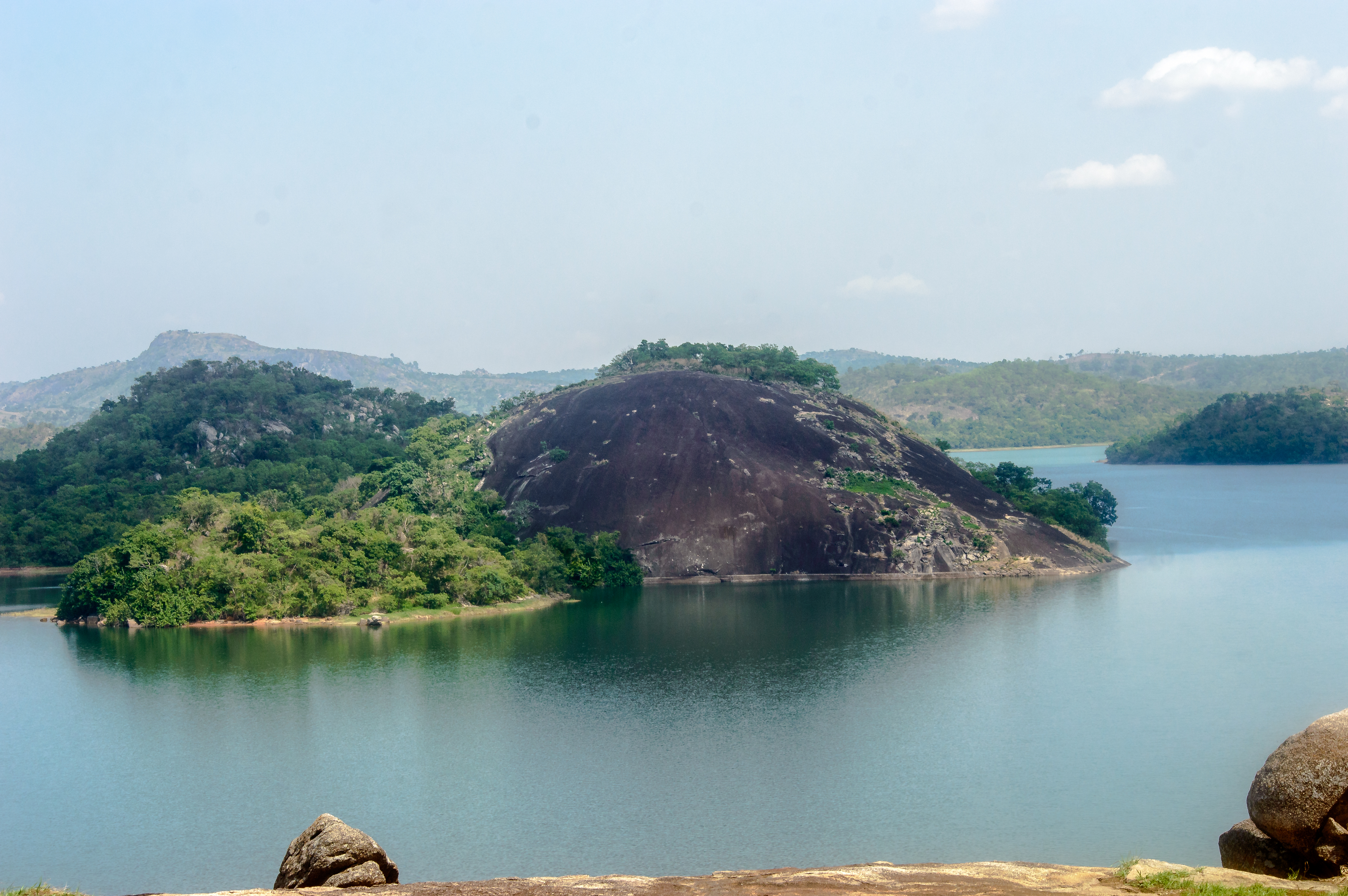
Usman dam. Bwari

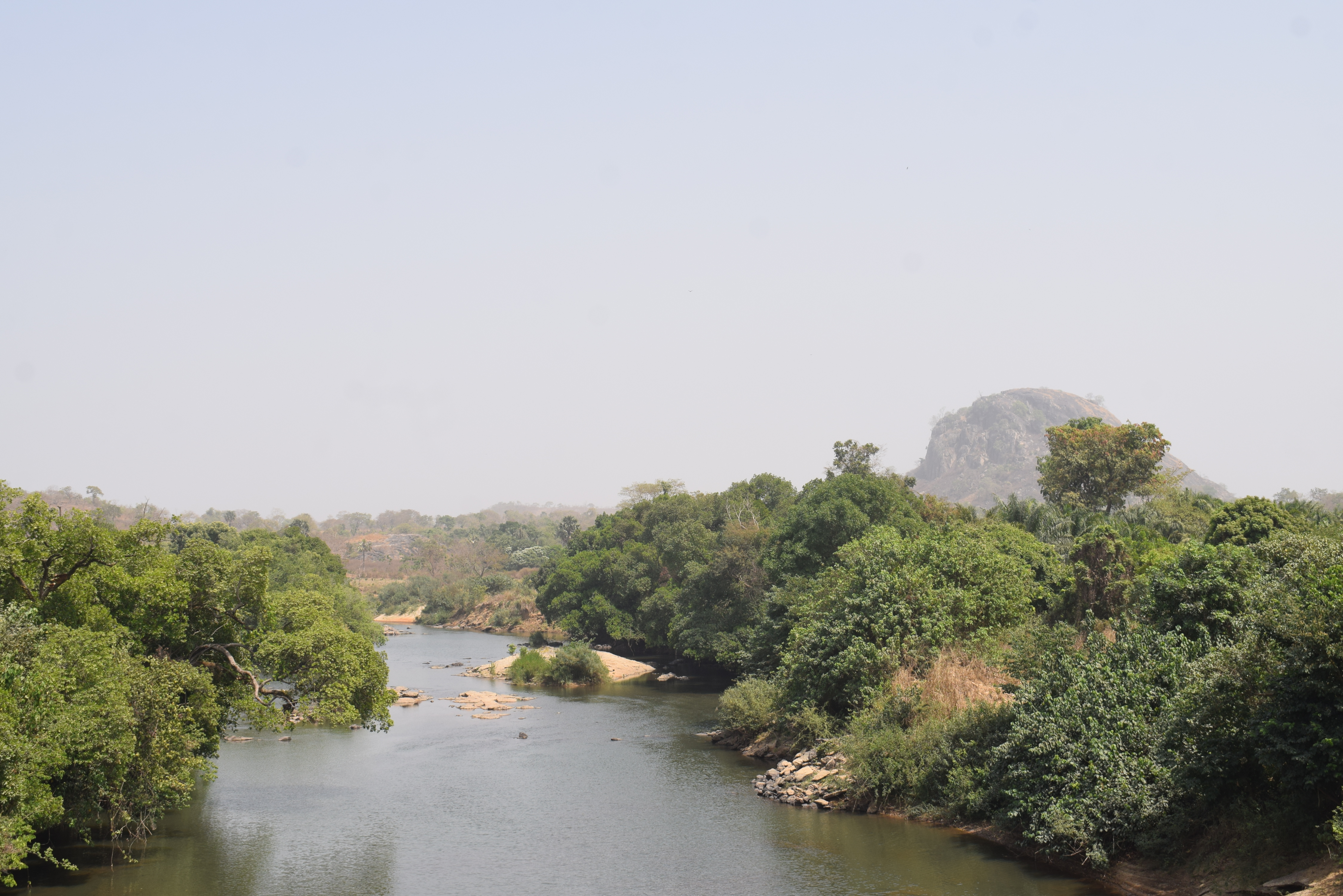
Gidan Akwaja River Bwari, Abuja Nigeria

Temperatures in the climate range from 59 °F to 93°F, rarely falling above 100 °F, and there are two hot, humid seasons that alternate with hot, partly overcast ones.

=== Average Temperature ===
The average daily maximum temperature during the 2.4-month hot season, which runs from January 30 to April 12, is above 90 °F. March is the hottest month in Bwari, with an average high temperature of 92 °F and low temperature of 69 °F. The average daily maximum temperature during the 3.5-month cool season, which runs from June 21 to October 4, is below 82 °F. December is the coldest month of the year in Bwari, with an average high temperature of 87 °F and low temperature of 60 °F.

=== Cloud ===
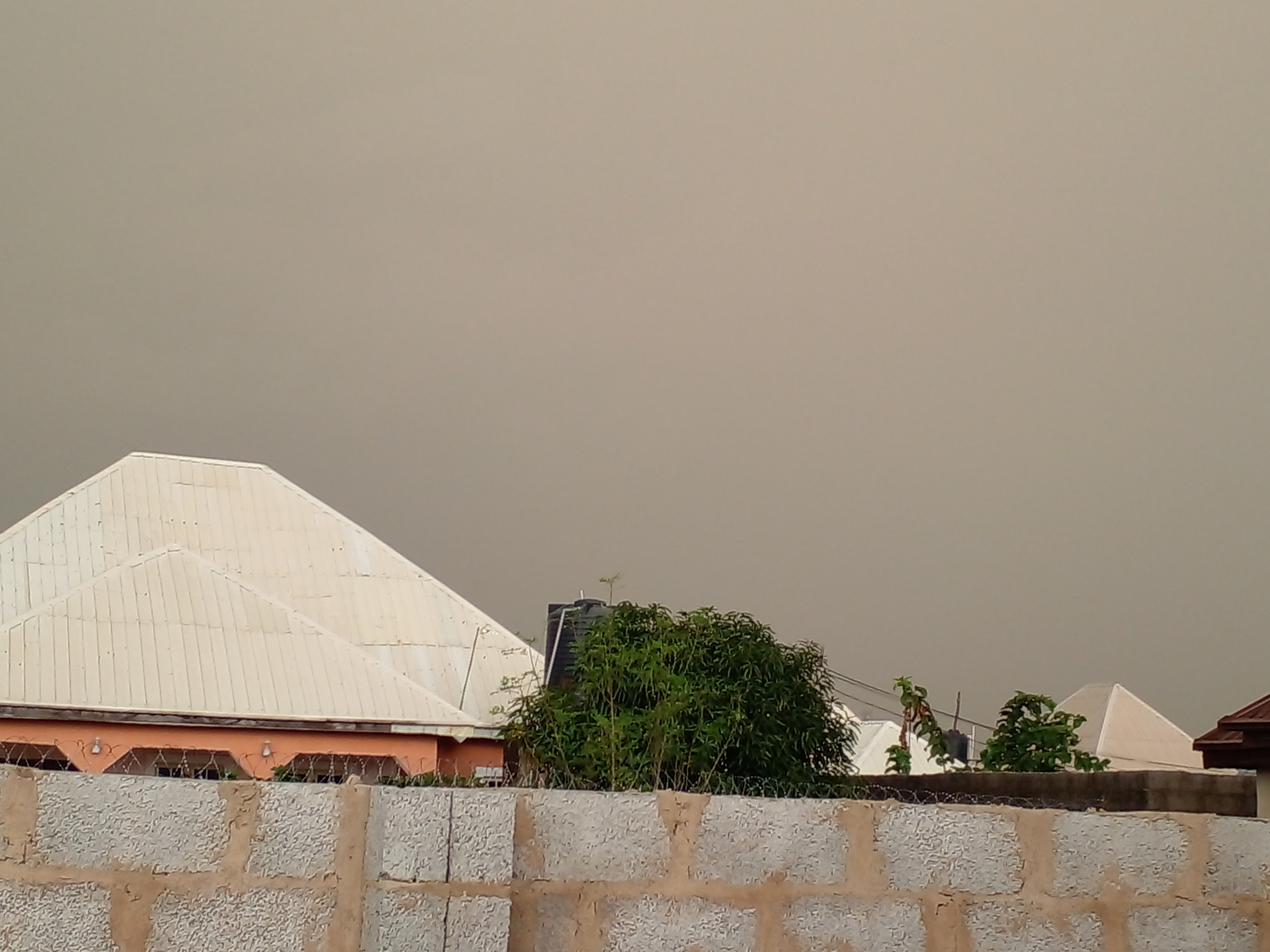
Bwari cloudy weather

Over the course of the year, Bwari's average percentage of cloud-covered sky varies significantly by season. In Bwari, the clearest portion of the year lasts 3.7 months, from roughly November 5 to February 25. In Bwari, January is the clearest month of the year with, on average, 55% of the sky being clear, mostly clear, or partly cloudy. Beginning from February 25 and lasting 8.4 months, the cloudier portion of the year ends approximately November 5. In Bwari, May has the highest percentage of cloud cover with an average of 84% cloud cover or overcast skies throughout the month.

=== Precipitation ===
When precipitation amounts to 1.0 millimetre (0.04 inches) or more, it is considered a wet day. Bwari experiences quite large seasonal variations in the likelihood of rainy days. Over 42% of days are likely to be rainy during the 6.2-month wetter season, which runs from April 15 to October 20. With 24.7 days on average with at least 1.0 millimetre (0.04 inches) of precipitation, September has the most rainy days in Bwari. October 20 through April 15 is the 5.8-month long dry season. At 1.0 millimetre (0.04 inches) of precipitation on average over no days, December has the fewest wet days in Bwari. We categorize rainy days into three categories: rain, snow, and a combination of the two. With an average of 24.7 days, September is the month with the most days of rain in Bwari. With a high probability of 85% on September 10, rain alone is the most frequent type of precipitation throughout the year, according to this classification.

=== Sun ===
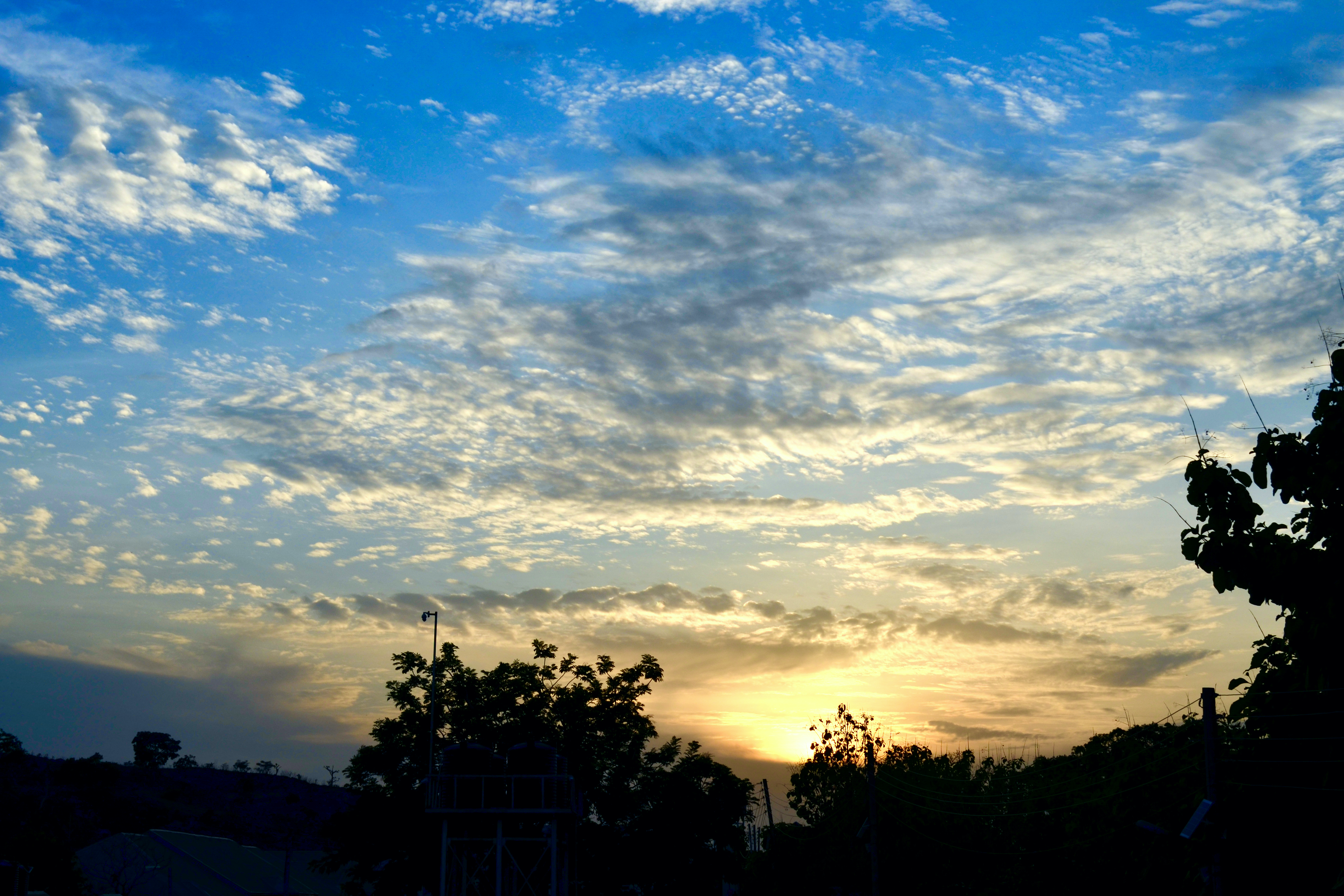
Sunset in Bwari Local Government Area

In Bwari, the length of a day doesn't change much from year to year; it stays between 40 minutes and 12 hours. December 21 has the fewest daylight hours in 2024–11 hours, 35 minutes—while June 20 has the most daylight hours—12 hours, 40 minutes.
