= Federal Polytechnic, Ile-Oluji =

Public university in Ile Oluji/Okeigbo, Ondo State, Nigeria

Coordinates: 7.2377°N 4.8671°E

- Type: Public
- Established: 2014
- Rector: Dr.Ademola Iyanda Ebeloku
- Location: Ile Oluji/Okeigbo, Ondo State, Nigeria
- Website: www.fedpolel.edu.ng

The Federal Polytechnic, Ile-Oluji is a Federal government owned higher education institution located in Ile Oluji, Ondo State, Nigeria. The current rector is Dr. Ademola Iyanda Ebeloku.

== History ==
The Federal Polytechnic, Ile-Oluji was established in 2014.

== Courses ==
The institution offers the following courses;

- Business Administration & Management
- Computer Engineering
- Science Laboratory Technology
- Civil Engineering Technology
- Computer Science
- Accountancy
- Cooperative Economics And Management
- Statistics
- Agricultural Technology
- Architectural Technology
- Fisheries Technology
- Electrical/Electronic Engineering Technology
