= Federal Polytechnic, Ukana =

- Type: Public
- Established: 2014
- Rector: Eduma Essien
- Location: Ukana, Akwa Ibom State, Nigeria
- Website: Official website

The Federal Polytechnic, Ukana is a federal government higher education institution located in Ukana, Akwa Ibom State, Nigeria. The current rector is Eduma Essien.

In 2023, Mercy Daniel Ebong was appointed the new rector by the Federal government.

== History ==
The Federal Polytechnic, Ukana was established in 2014.

== Courses ==
The institution offers the following courses;

- Computer Science
- Science Laboratory Technology
- Accountancy
- Statistics
- Mechanical Engineering Technology
- Business Administration and Management
- Computer Engineering
- Electrical/Electronic Engineering
