= National Board for Technical Education =

Board overview
- Formed: 1977
- Superseding Board: Nigerian Federal Ministry of Education
- Jurisdiction: Federal Government of Nigeria
- Headquarters: Kaduna, Kaduna State, Nigeria
- Motto: Education for Self Reliance
- Website: nbte.gov.ng

The National Board for Technical Education, otherwise known as NBTE, is a Nigerian board of education which supervises, regulates and oversees educational programmes offered by technical institutions at secondary, polytechnic and monotechnic levels through an accreditation process. It was established by Act No 9 of 11 July 1977 with the aim of "providing standardised minimum guide curricula for Technical and Vocational Education and Training".

The National Board for Technical Education (NBTE) has granted approval to the Federal Polytechnic, Ede, for the commencement of Open and Distance Flexible E-Learning.

== See also ==
- Nigerian Federal Ministry of Education
- Education in Nigeria
