= Federal Polytechnic Nasarawa =

Public polytechnic in Nasarawa, Nasarawa State, Nigeria

Federal Polytechnic, Nasarawa
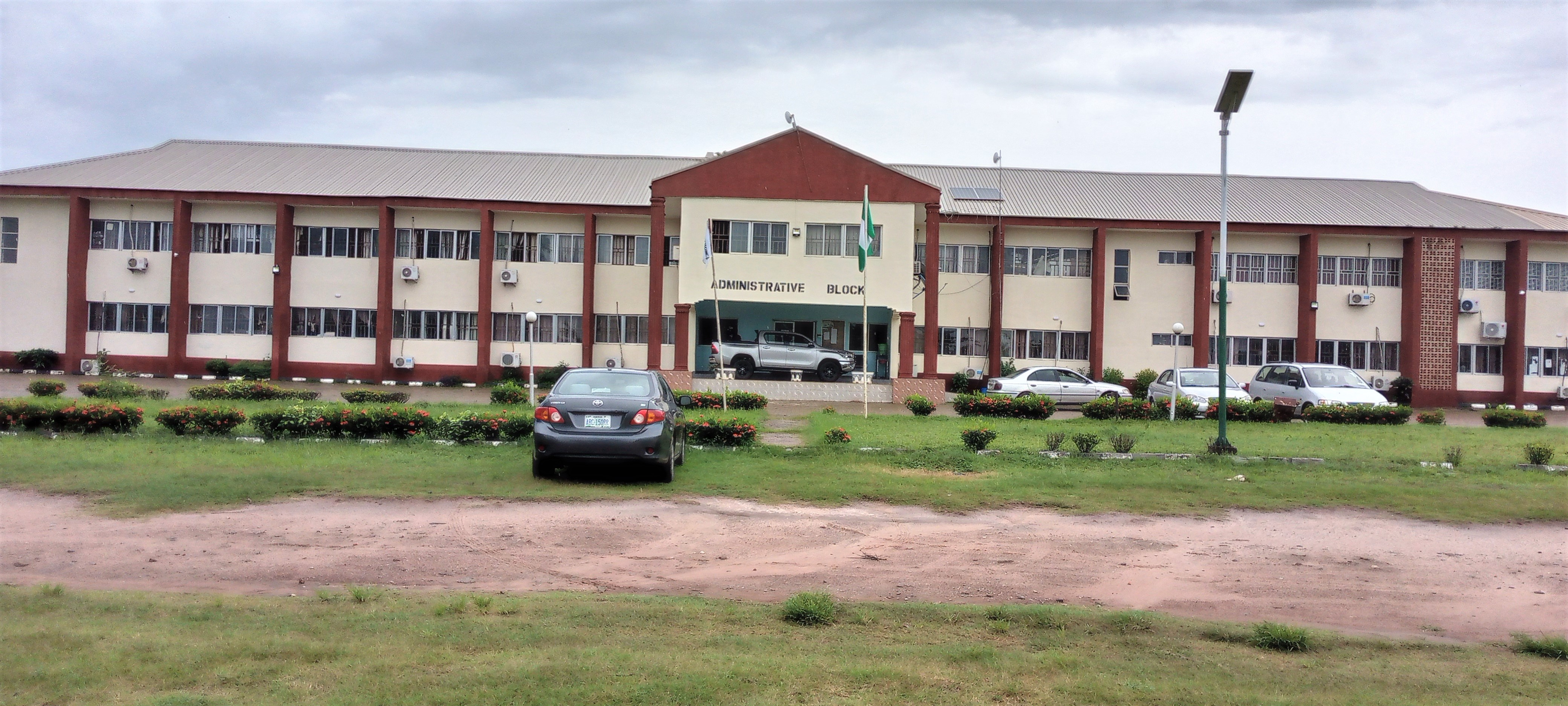
- Administrative block
- Motto: Learning, Technology and Services
- Motto in English: Learning, Technology and Services
- Type: Public
- Established: 1 July 1983; 43 years ago
- Rector: Abdullahi Alhassan Ahmed
- Academic staff: 900
- Students: 10,000
- Location: Nasarawa, Nasarawa State, Nigeria; 08°32′N 07°42′E
- Website: fpn.edu.ng

The Federal Polytechnic, Nasarawa, abbreviated FPN, is a tertiary institution in Nasarawa, Nasarawa State, Nigeria commonly referred to as FedPolyNas or simply FPN. The school was established on 1 July 1983 by the Federal Government of Nigeria to foster technological development in the society. In 2019, the school matriculated over 3,681 students, 2,361 being National Diploma and 1,320 being Higher National Diploma students. The Rector as of November 2020, Abdullahi Ahmed, revealed to National Information Technology Development Agency (NITDA) boss in Abuja, the desire of the institution to become a reference point in terms of adequate ICT infrastructure and standard training facilities and how much had been invested so far.

== Organisation ==
All basic lectures are held in English language.

=== Schools ===
FedPolyNas is divided into Seven schools:

S 1 – School of Agriculture
S 2 – School of Applied Sciences
S 3 – School of Business Studies
S 4 – School of Environmental Studies
S 5 – School of Engineering Technology
S 6 – School of General Studies
S 7 – School of Continuing Education

== Associations ==
Below is the list of all registered associations, clubs and societies as of 2011:

- Academic Staff Union of Polytechnics (ASUP)
- Abuja National Students' Union (ANSU)
- Apostolic Church Students Fellowship of Nigeria (ACSFN)
- Association of General Studies Department (AGSD)
- Benue State Students' Union (BESSU)
- Borno-Yobe Students Association (BYSA)
- Christ Ambassadors Students Out Reach (CASOR)
- Christ Apostolic Church Students Campus Fellowship (CACSCF)
- Community of Christian Students (CCS)
- Creative Arts Club
- Deeper Life Campus Fellowship (DLCF)
- Discovery Club
- Drama Club
- Estate Management Students Association (EMSA)
- Federal Road Safety Club (FRSC)
- Federal Union of Edo State Students (FUESS)
- Fellowship of Christian Students (FCS)
- Global Leadership Interlink (GLI)
- Gombe State Students Association (GSSA)
- Information Technology Club (ITC)
- Kaduna State Students Association (KADSSA)
- Kano State Students Association (KSSA)
- Kogi State Students Association (KOSSA)
- Mass Communication, Theatre and Dramatic Society (MCTDS)
- Muslim Students' Society of Nigeria (MSSN)
- Nasarawa State Students Association (NASSA)
- National Association of Accountancy Students (NAAS)
- National Association of Akwa Ibom State Students (NAAKISS)
- National Association of Anambra State Students (NAASS)
- National Association of Agricultural and Bio Environmental Engineering Students (NAABES)
- National Association of Building Students (NABS)
- National Association of Business Administration and Management Students (NABAMS)
- National Association of Crime Management Students (NACMS)
- National Association of Cross River State Students (NACRSS)
- National Association of Delta State Students (NADSS)
- National Association of Electrical Engineering Students (NAEES)
- National Association of Katsina State Students (NAKASS)
- National Association of Kwara State Students (NAKSS)
- National Association of Marketing Students (NAMS)
- National Association of Mechanical Engineering Students (NAMES)
- National Association of Niger State Students (NANSS)
- National Association of Plateau State Students (NAPSS)
- National Association of Polytechnic Engineering Students (NAPES)
- National Association of Q. S. Students (NAQSS)
- National Association of Science and Technology Students (NASTES)
- National Association of Secretarial Students (NASS)
- National Association of Town Planning Students (NATPS)
- National Gamji Memorial Club (NGMC)
- National Society of Architectural Technology Students (NSATA)
- National Union of Rivers State Students (NURSA)
- Nigerian Federation of Catholic Students (NFCS)
- Ondo State Students' Association (OSSA)
- Osun State Progressive Students Union (OSPSU)
- Oyo State Students'Association (OYSSA)
- Rotaract Club
- Sokoto-Kebbi Students Association (SKSA)
- Students Discovery Club
- Students Safety Club (SSC)
- Students' Union Government (SUG)
- Taraba State Students Union (TSSU)
- The Cadet Force
- The Press Club
- Winners Campus Fellowship (WCF)
- Women Trafficking & Child Labour Eradication Foundation (WTCLEF)
- Zamfara State Students Association (ZSSA)

== Funding ==
The school was one of the 19 federal and state own polytechnics to receive financial support from the Tertiary Education Trust Fund (TETFund) in July 2017. As reported by The Guardian, the institution got N43.5m out of a total of N847.4m.

== Event hosting and infrastructure ==
=== Sports ===
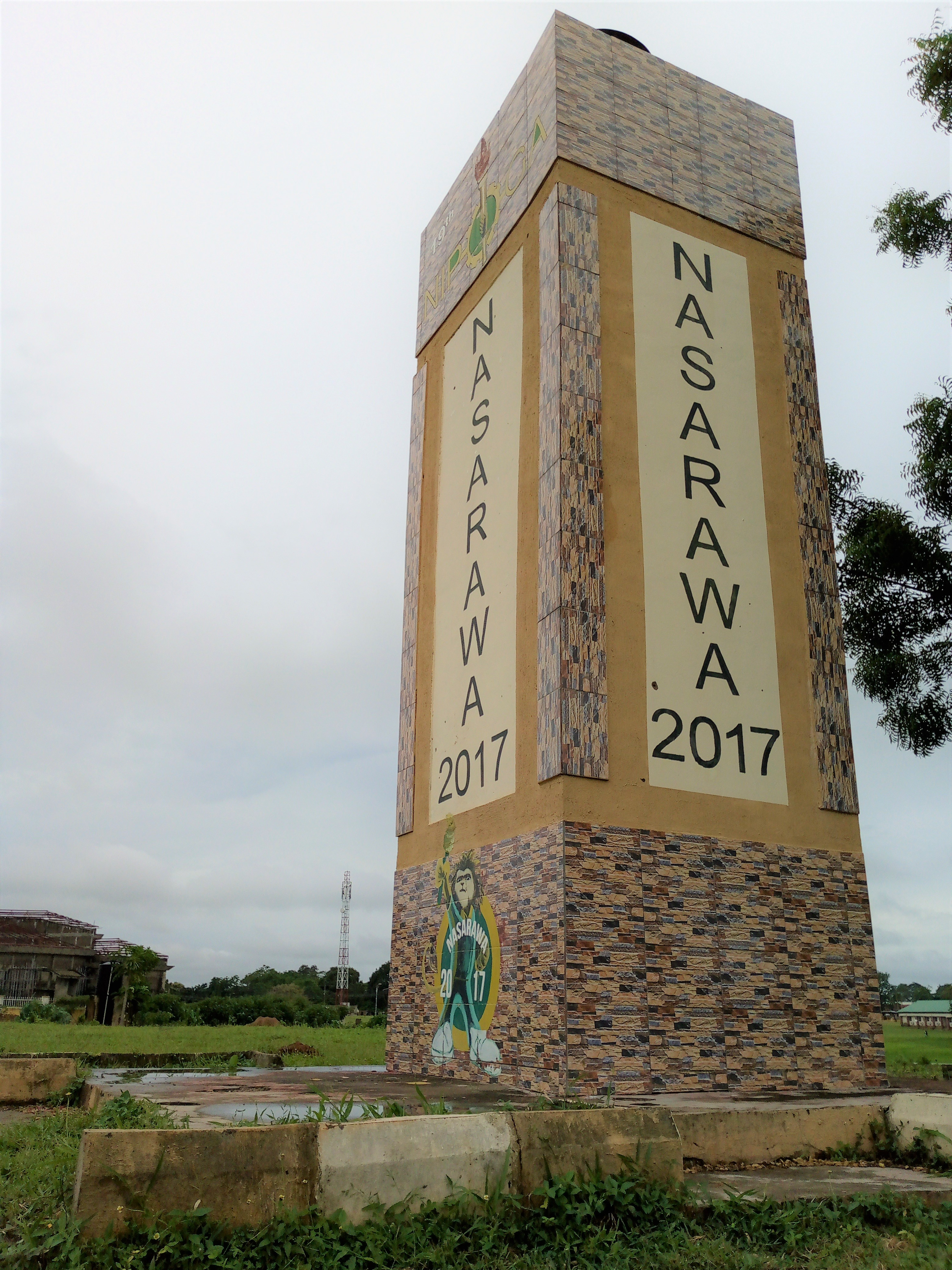
Lighthouse, Nasarawa 2017

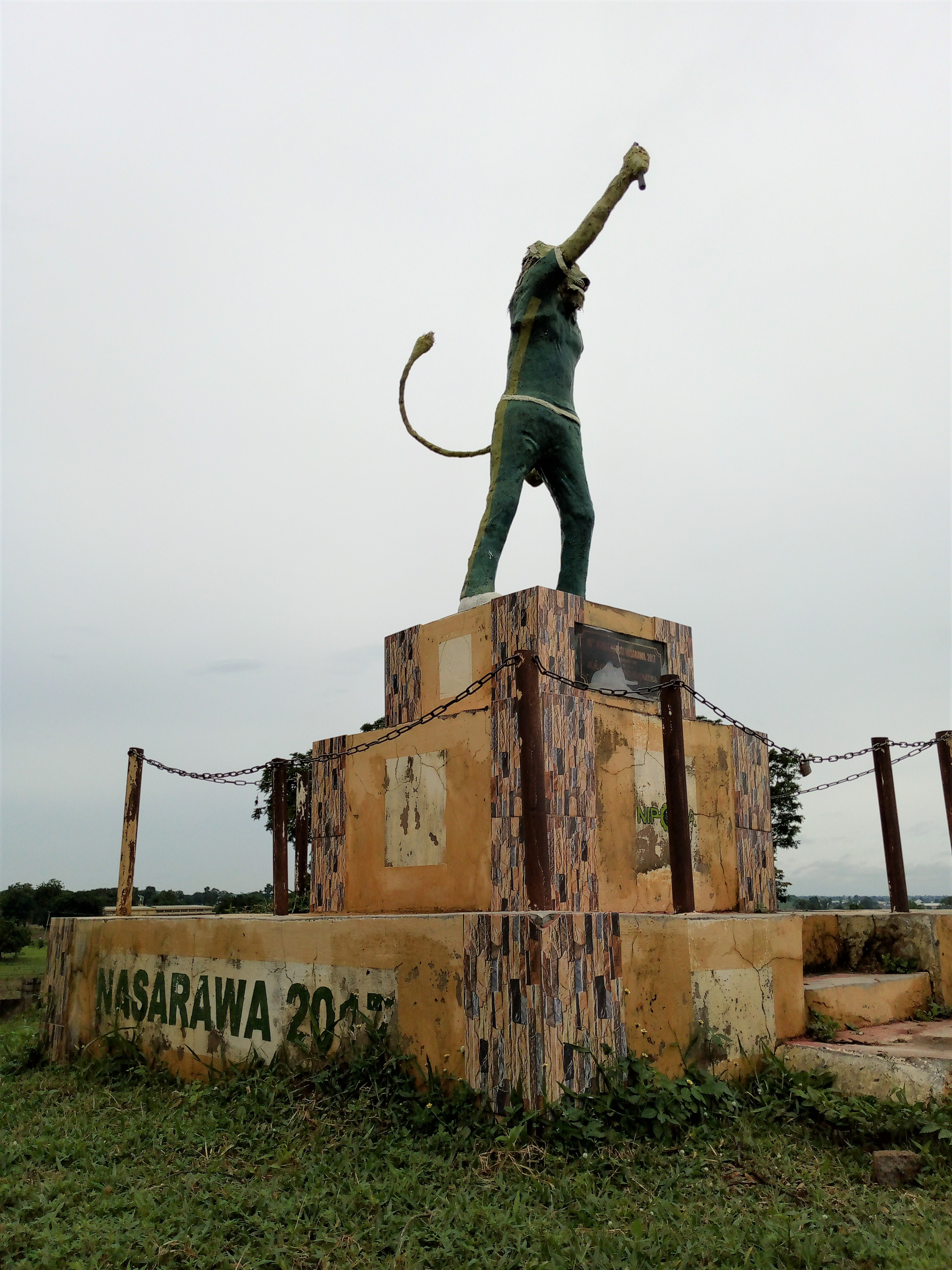
Nasarawa 2017 Mascot

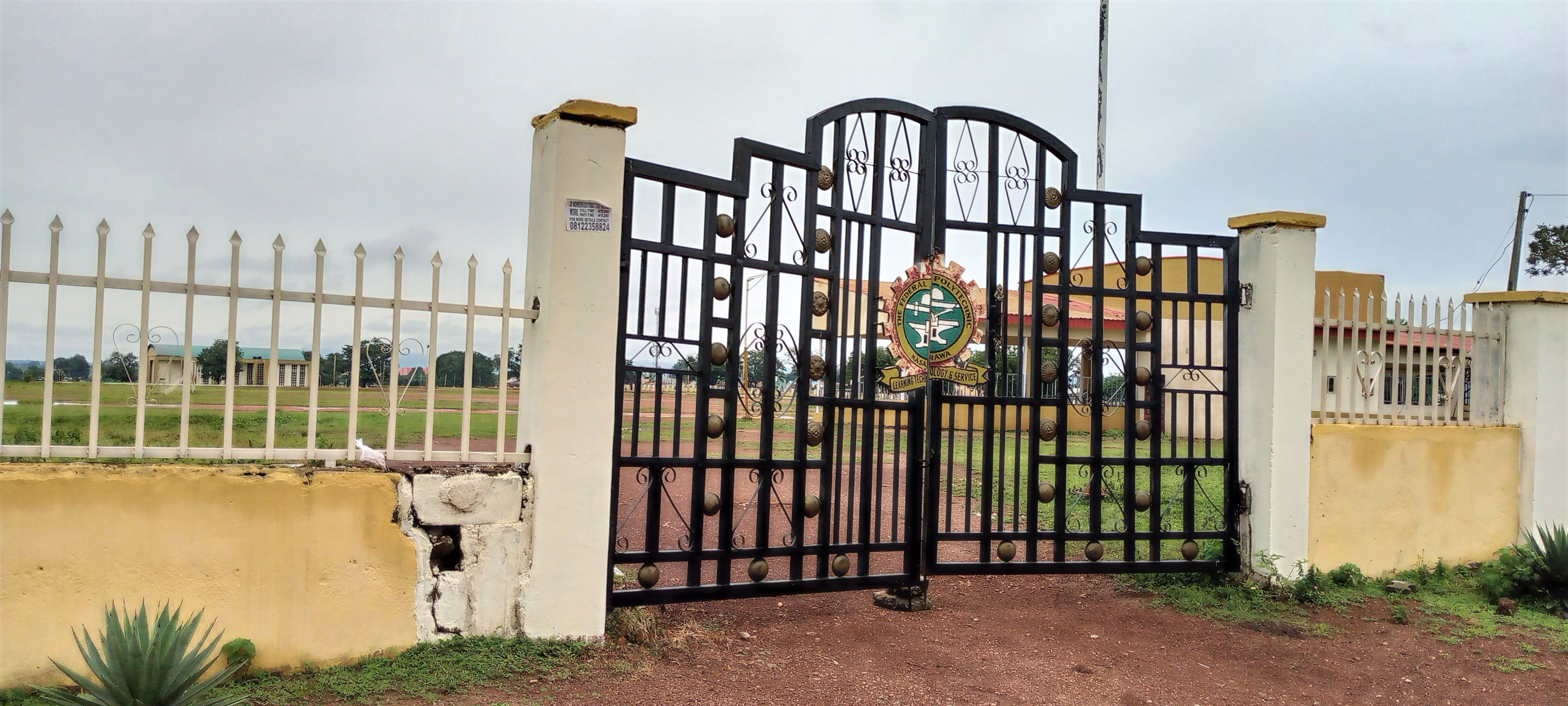
Gate, Mini stadium

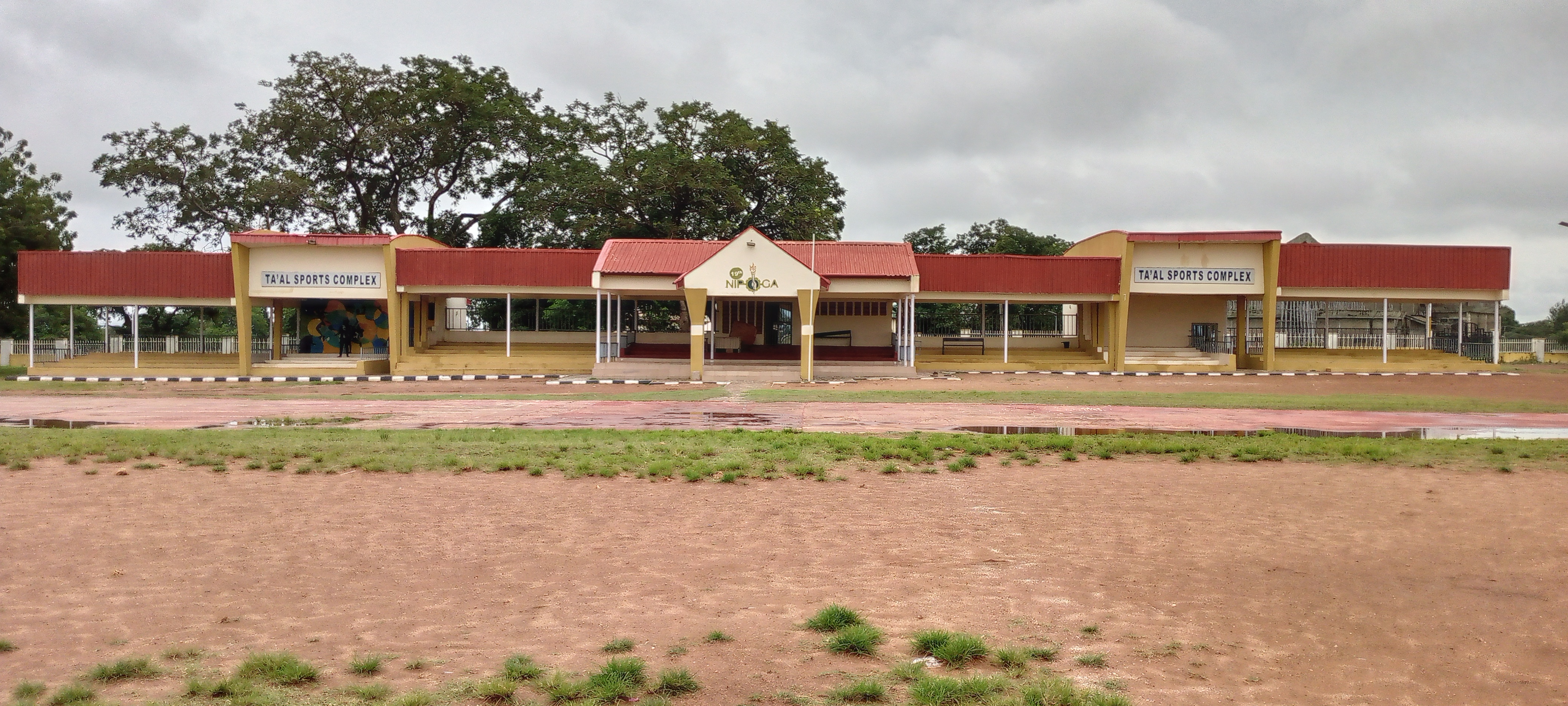
Ta'al Sports pavilion

The institution got the chance to improve on its sports infrastructure when it was selected to host the 19th Nigeria Polytechnic Games Association (NIPOGA) events that was held between 26 April to 6 May 2017, tagged "Nasarawa 2017", in which Lagos State Polytechnic (LASPOTECH) emerged overall winners. According to its rector as of then, Prof. Shettima Abdulkadir Saidu, the facilities realized included an indigenously made cauldron, mascot, the pavilion named after the then Nasarawa State governor, Umaru Tanko Al-Makura, plus the commissioning of a 1,500 capacity Multipurpose Hall, named after the Nigerian president, Muhammadu Buhari. In addition, the FPN FM 88.5 Radio station, which broadcast the entire NIPOGA activities was commissioned. The events were promoted by the A3 Foundation.

The school participated in the 19th National Board for Technical Education (NBTE)/Nigeria Polytechnics Senior Staff Games (NIPOSSGA) events, held 21–28 April 2018, in Enugu.

=== Events ===
In 2018, the school hosted the 91st National Executive Council (NEC) meeting of the Academic Staff Union of Polytechnics (ASUP).

== Discipline ==
In 2008, about 133 students from the previous academic session drawn from all the departments of the school were, according to its then rector, Pius Salami, during the matriculation ceremony for the 2007–2008 student set expelled for certificate forgery and examination malpractice related offences.

== Controversies ==
=== High cost of rent ===
In 2022, due to the ASUU strike affecting federal universities, many students opted for a change of institution, including Federal Polytechnic Nasarawa. This influx of applicants led to a significant surge in house rental prices. Single rooms and self-contained apartments, which used to cost as little as ₦30,000 and ₦55,000, respectively, saw their rents skyrocket to as high as ₦100,000 for single rooms and ₦300,000 for self-contained units. Despite students' repeated attempts to draw the attention of school authorities and the Student Union Government (SUG) president to address this issue, their efforts have been in vain. This situation has left numerous students filled with regret over their choice of institution.

== See also ==
- List of polytechnics in Nigeria
