= Oluwatoyin Atanda =

Oluwatoyin Atanda-Rufai
- Education: Lagos State University; Lagos State Polytechnic; University of South Wales
- Occupations: Public servant, youth leader
- Employer: Lagos State Government
- Known for: 54th President of JCI Nigeria
- Title: Senior Special Assistant to the Governor of Lagos State on Establishments and Training

Oluwatoyin Atanda-Rufai is a Nigerian public servant and youth leader. She served as the 54th National President of Junior Chamber International (JCI) Nigeria in 2025 and currently serves as Senior Special Assistant to the Governor of Lagos State on Establishments and Training.

== Early life and education ==
Atanda-Rufai studied Chemistry at Lagos State University, where she obtained a Bachelor of Science (B.Sc.) degree. She also obtained a Higher National Diploma (HND) in Civil Engineering from Lagos State Polytechnic.

She later obtained a Master of Business Administration (MBA) from the University of South Wales in the United Kingdom. Her further professional education includes certification in Business Analytics from Cornell University in the United States and a qualification in Marketing Strategy from the Metropolitan School of Business and Management in the United Kingdom.

Atanda-Rufai also undertook leadership training through the JCI Academy in Fukui, Japan, as part of her professional development within Junior Chamber International (JCI).

== Career ==
Atanda-Rufai has built a career spanning public administration, human-capital development, business management and youth leadership. She previously served as General Manager of The Grid Lagos, overseeing operations across subsidiaries in Lagos and Kigali, before joining the Lagos State Government, where she initially served as Senior Special Assistant on Human Capital Development.

=== Junior Chamber International ===
Atanda-Rufai joined Junior Chamber International (JCI) Nigeria in 2009 and subsequently held several leadership positions, including Director of Sustainable Development Goals, Vice President, Chairperson of the Ten Outstanding Young Persons programme and Executive Vice President for the South-West. She was elected the organisation's 54th National President for 2025, under the theme “ELV8”, through which her administration pursued projects focused on leadership development, youth employability, entrepreneurship, partnerships and community impact. During her tenure, JCI Nigeria launched eight flagship projects, including the ELV8 Mentorship and Exchange Programme, Creative Young Entrepreneurs Programme, and JCI Training Institute. In November 2025, she was named JCI's Most Outstanding National President of the year from more than 100 national presidents at the JCI World Congress in Tunis, Tunisia.

=== Lagos State Government ===
As Senior Special Assistant to the Governor of Lagos State on Establishments and Training, Atanda-Rufai has worked on initiatives aimed at strengthening the capacity and effectiveness of the state public service. During her tenure, she contributed to the development of Lagos State's first knowledge-sharing platform and Learning Management System, pioneered the Lagos State Public-Private Exchange Programme, through which public officers gain experience in private-sector organisations, and launched the Lagos State Public Service Accelerator Programme (PSAP) for mid-level civil servants on Grades 12–14. She also facilitated a partnership with Tech4Dev that trained 3,000 public servants with Microsoft-endorsed certification and contributed to the Lagos Economic Summit, Lagos Leadership Summit and conceptualisation of the Lateef Jakande Leadership Academy. She additionally serves as Lagos State Coordinator for the African Union Development Agency–New Partnership for Africa's Development (AUDA-NEPAD), representing the state in engagements focused on aligning subnational development with the African Union's Agenda 2063.
