= Ibikunle =

Nigerian Given Name

- Language: Yoruba

Origin
- Origin: Nigeria
- Meaning: Birth Fills the House
- Region of origin: South-west Nigeria

Other names
- Variant forms: Adekúnlé, Olakúnlé, Fakúnlé, Omikúnlé
- Short form: kúnlé

Ìbíkúnléaudio is a Yoruba name from Nigeria, meaning "Birth Fills the House", derived from ìbí (birth), kun (fill), and ilé (house). It's diminutive variants includes "Kunle" among other.

Notable people with the name include:

- Ibikunle Amosun, Nigerian politician
- Gbenga Ibikunle, British Nigerian economist
- Christopher Ibikunle Alder
- Ibikunle Akitoye, Oba of Lagos (1925–1928)
- Fausat Adebola Ibikunle, commissioner of Kaduna state
