= Nigeria College of Education Games Association =

- Status: active
- Genre: sporting event
- Frequency: biennial
- Location: various
- Country: Nigeria
- Inaugurated: 1978

Nigeria College of Education Games Association, popularly known as NICEGA Games is a sporting competition among all colleges of education in Nigeria. The first games was held in 1978. The 17th games, originally meant to hold in November 2011, was postponed till February 2012 by hosts, Federal College of Education, Omoku in Rivers State due to logistics challenges. For the 18th edition, 42 Nigerian colleges of education participated in the games hosted by Niger State College of Education, Minna. The 2015 edition saw the games return to the South to be hosted by Adeyemi College of Education. In the football tournament of the 19th games, Adeyemi College of Education were defeated by College of Education, Ikere-Ekiti.

In 2017, the three sporting bodies responsible for organization competitions for higher institutions in Nigeria, NUGA Games, NIPOGA Games and NICEGA Games had a combined session to reorganize sports in Nigerian institutions.

== See also ==
- List of colleges of education in Nigeria
