= Solomon Omolayo Omogboye =

Nigerian artist

Solomon Omolayo Omogboye (born 19 August 1982) is a Nigerian visual artist and painter, based in South Africa. His style involves the combination of mainly charcoal, pastel, acrylic and oil on canvas to depict emotions centred around life.

== Early beginning ==
Omogboye began painting as a child, a decision that was supported by his mother, who provided the necessary resources that he needed. He obtained a higher national diploma in industrial design from Lagos State Polytechnic in 2007, and was awarded the artist of the year in the same year. He relocated to Johannesburg in 2014, he often demonstrated his paintings and worked in secondary schools in Lagos and Nasarawa States. According to him, his first professional painting was in 1996 when he was required to illustrate a painting on a school wall. He sees art as a "means of escape" in "reframing" his many questions about life.

== Painting and art gallery ==
While in South Africa, Omogboye set up his art studio, Living Artist Emporium. He is also professionally connected to August House Studios. According to African Art Consultants, Omogboye can be described as one of the "leading young Nigerian artists" whose emotions and beliefs are often depicted in his illustrations. In 2017, his work was selected to be auctioned by a firm to raise funds for surrounding schools.

In April 2019, Omogboye's event, Shades of the Mirror was listed as one of eight art exhibitions that should not be missed according to OkayAfrica. Cape Town Etc described the exhibition as a "story of experience, truth, and of daring to live for a better life".

=== Selected works ===
- Insightful Medidation (2020)
- Reflection
- Rise from Grace
- Hope
- Vulnerable
- Colourful Buterfly
