= Olubunmi Owoso =

Nigerian academic administrator (1949–2020)

Rector, Yabatech
- In office December, 2001 – December, 2009
- Preceded by: Felicia Abimbola Odugbesan

Secretary General/CEO, CAPA
- In office March 2012 – December 2018

Personal details
- Born: October 23, 1949 Osun State Nigeria
- Died: June 28, 2020 (aged 70)

Olubunmi Felix Owoso (October 23, 1949 – June 28, 2020) was a former Rector, Yaba College of Technology (YABATECH) and Secretary-General of the Commonwealth Association of Technical Universities and Polytechnics in Africa (CAPA).

== Early life and education ==
Olubunmi Owoso was born on October 23, 1949, in Osun State, Nigeria. He graduated from the University of Ibadan in 1972 with a B.Sc. (Hons) in Agriculture. He obtained an M.Sc. in Food Technology (1981) from University of Reading, UK and an M.Sc. in Development Studies (1995) from London South Bank University. In 2013, he obtained his Ph.D. in Management Science from the Ladoke Akintola University of Technology, Ogbomoso, Nigeria.

== Career ==
Olubunmi Owoso served as Head of the Department of Food Technology at Kaduna Polytechnic from October, 1981 to September, 1985. He served as a visiting lecturer at the Department of Biotechnology, South Bank Polytechnic UK, (now, London South Bank University) from January 1992 to June 1993. From 2001-2009 he was the Rector of Yaba College of Technology (YABATECH). He was also the Head of the Department of Food Technology and the National President of the Polytechnic Staff Association of Nigeria (POSSAN). He was appointed the Secretary General of Commonwealth Association of Technical Universities and Polytechnics (CAPA) based in Nairobi, Kenya in 2012.

He was credited with the establishment of the Centre for Entrepreneurship Development, Internal Quality Assurance Unit; Centre for Applied Research and Technology Innovation, a new satellite campus of the Yaba College of Technology (YABATECH) in Epe, Lagos State.
