= Yaba College of Technology =

College in Lagos, Nigeria

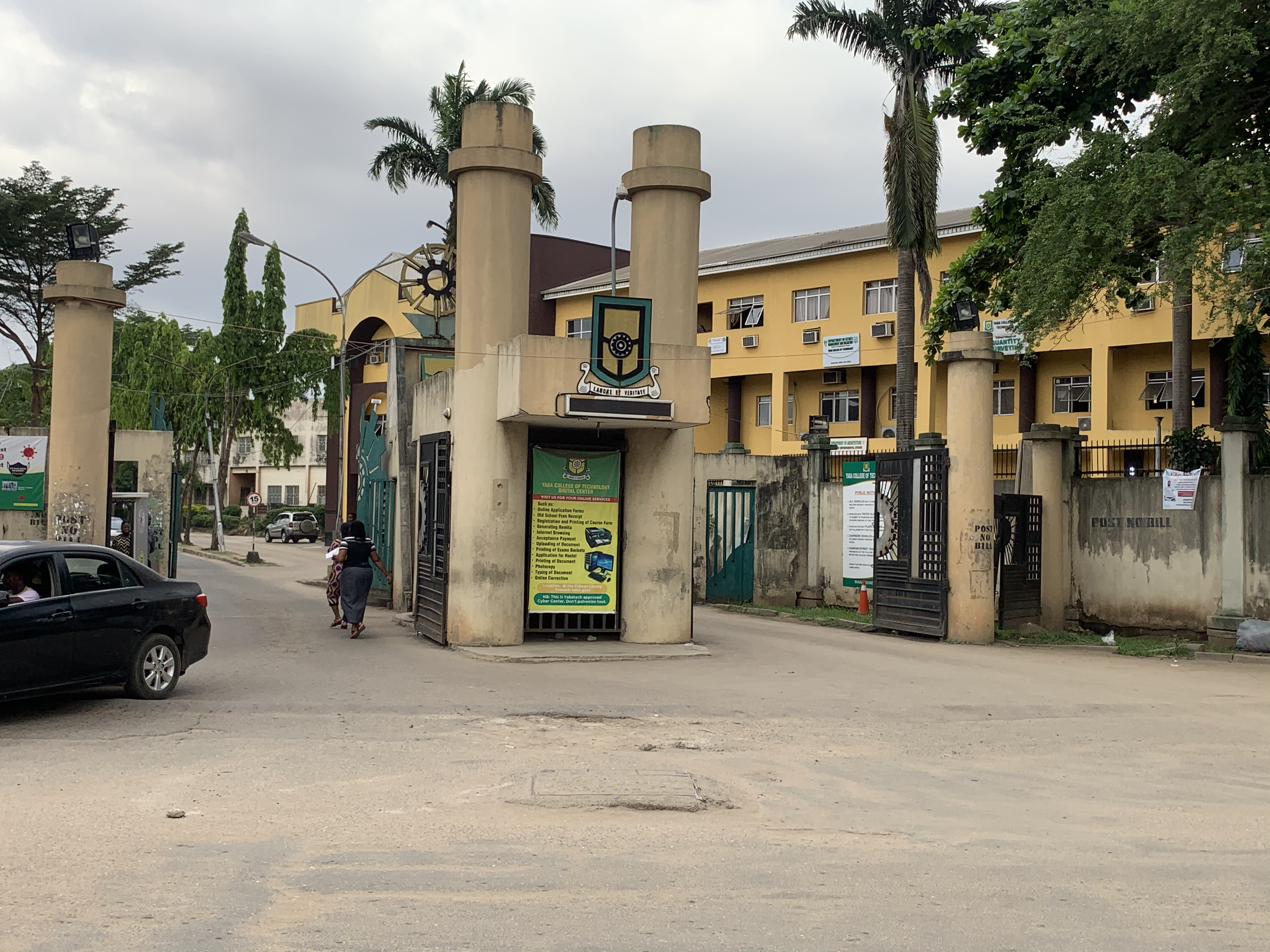
- Yaba Tech second gate
- Other name: Yabatech / YCT
- Former names: Yaba Higher College, Federal Polytechnic Yaba
- Motto: Labore Et Veritate
- Type: Public
- Established: 1947
- Rector: Dr Engr Ibraheem Adedotun Abdul
- Location: Yaba, Lagos, Nigeria; 6°37′02″N 3°19′12″E
- Campus: Urban
- Colours: Yellow and green
- Website: www.yabatech.edu.ng

Yaba College of Technology, popularly known as YABATECH, was founded in 1947, and is Nigeria's first higher educational institution. It is located in Yaba, Lagos. As of 2008, it had a student enrolment of over 16,000. It also has a secondary school and a staff primary school.

== Overview ==
Yaba College of Technology was established in 1947 as a successor of Yaba Higher College. It attained autonomous status in 1969 by virtue of Decree 23 which granted it the mandate to provide full-time and part-time courses of instruction and training in technology, applied science, commerce and management, agricultural production and distribution; and for research.

Yaba College of Technology is the first higher institution in Nigeria to establish a Centre for Entrepreneurship Development, with linkages with the world of commerce and industry. The centre offers compulsory courses which must be taken by all students throughout their stay in the college.

There is a Quality Assurance Unit in the college which monitors the quality of academic service delivery.

The Applied Research and Technology Innovation (ARTI) Unit was established to promote research and linkages with private sector organisations for the exploitation and use of research. ARTI also assists to promote linkages between students of Yabatech and students of other institutions especially in the area of research.

Free medical service is provided at the Medical Centre, which is open 24/7. Sports facilities are provided at the sport complex which is located at the centre of the campus. The college has won the Nigeria Polytechnic Games Association five times out of sixteen editions of the competition.

The college has a second campus at Epe, this campus is home to the Department of Agricultural Technology and Michael Otedola Information and Communication Centre.

The College is currently headed by Dr. (Engr.) Ibraheem Adedotun Abdul.

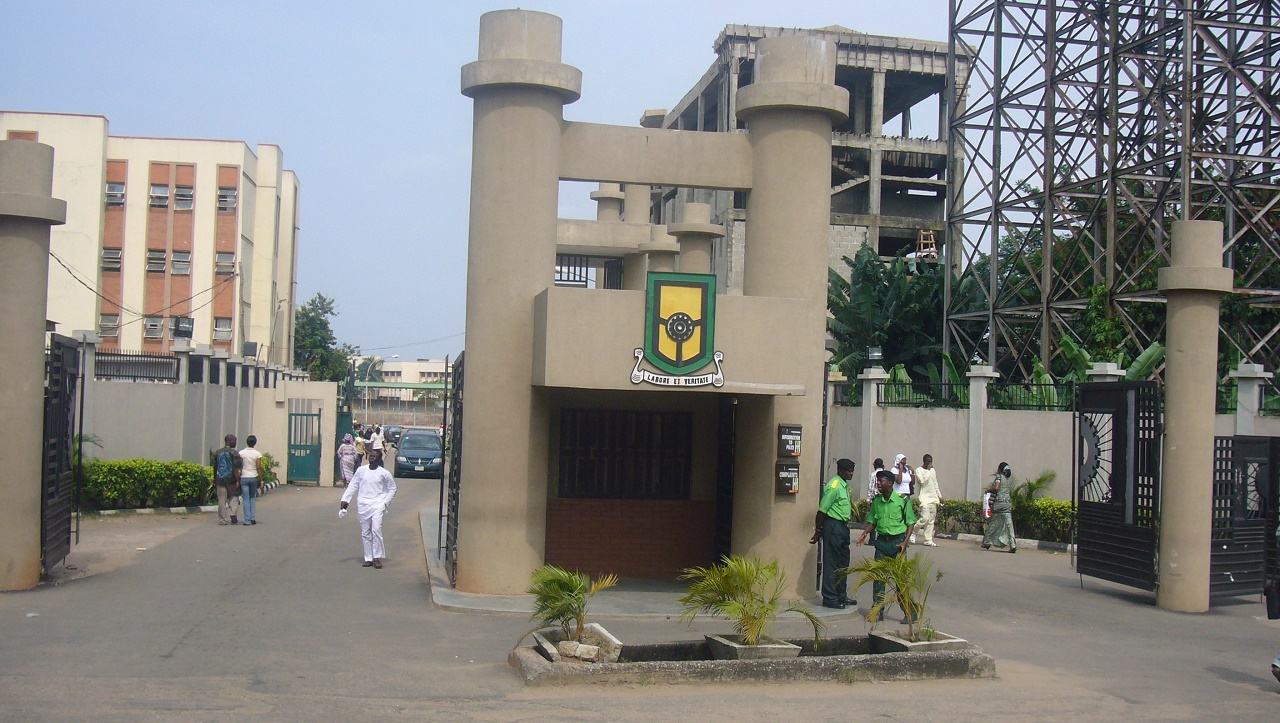
Yaba College of Technology Gate

The name was changed to Federal Polytechnic Yaba in 1979, but changed back to the current one in 1980. The over 70 years Institution has been headed by a number of indigenous principals and rectors:

- Dr E.A Akinleye – Principal (1970–1975)
- Mr G.M Okufi – 1st Rector (1975–1985)
- Dr Philip Adegbile – Rector (1985–1993)
- Mrs F.A Odugbesan – Rector (1993–2001)
- Mr Olubunmi Owoso – Rector (2001–2009)
- Dr (Mrs) M.K Ladipo – Rector (2009–2017)
- Engr. Obafemi Owoseni Omokungbe – Rector (2018–2023)
- Mr. Uduak Iyang Udoh- Ag. Rector (Jan–May 2023)
- Dr (Engr) Ibraheem Adedotun Abdul (Incumbent)

== Courses and programmes ==
Yaba College of Technology has eight schools and thirty-four academic departments with a total of sixty-four accredited programmes, across ND, HND and Post-HND levels. The college also offers certificate courses.

YABATECH offers B.Sc. (Ed) courses in Technical and Vocational education and Postgraduate Diplomas in Engineering. The two programmes are run in conjunction with the University of Nigeria, Nsukka and the Federal University of Technology, Akure, respectively. The student population which is made up of both full-time and part-time students is in the range of 15,000, while the staff strength is 1,600.

In April 2015, the National Board for Technical Education (NBTE) approved five new courses for Yaba College of Technology. The courses are Higher National Diploma in Mass Communication, Banking and Finance, Metallurgy Engineering, National Diploma in Welding and Fabrication and Public Administration.

In June 2019, Yaba College of Technology made the move to partner with a Nigerian security solutions company to design and implement a Security Management Certification Programme. According to the duo, the programme targets individuals, who desire to be modern security managers and those in active security employment or planning to venture into the security industry from managerial levels. Speaking at an event organised recently by the institutions to sign a Memorandum of Understanding (MoU), Director, Yabatech Consult Limited, Uduak Inyang-Udoh, said the collaboration would bridge the knowledge gap in attaining global security standard.

== Library ==
The Yabatech library is the nerve centre of academic activities in the college. The library holds large volumes of collection in print and non print formats to cater for the information needs of staff, students ad the entire college community.

== Yabatech Radio ==
Yabatech Radio (89.3 MHz FM) is the official campus radio of Yaba College of Technology, covering part of Lagos State. The radio station officially came to life under the administration of Engr. Femi Omokungbe as Rector, Yaba College of Technology.

The radio station was established primarily to serve the YABATECH community and its neighbouring communities through local programme development, exposition of local talents, music, news, weather, and market information as well as giving a voice to the populace. In addition, it serves as a training ground for students of the mass communication department of the college.

== Notable alumni ==
- Olusegun Adejumo, visual artist
- Fola Adeola, co-founder, GTBank
- Josy Ajiboye, cartoonist
- Niyi Akinmolayan, filmmaker and director
- Adebanji Alade, president of the Royal Institute of Oil Painters
- Ayodeji Balogun, entrepreneur, commodity trader and CEO
- Omotola Jalade Ekeinde, actress
- Fecko, musician, emcee
- Gbenga Ibikunle, economist
- Ruth Kadiri, actress and film producer
- Kaffy, dancer
- Jide Kosoko, actor, director and producer
- Bidemi Olaoba, gospel singer, songwriter and composer
- Tim Owhefere, politician

== Architecture and monuments ==
Campus of YABATECH

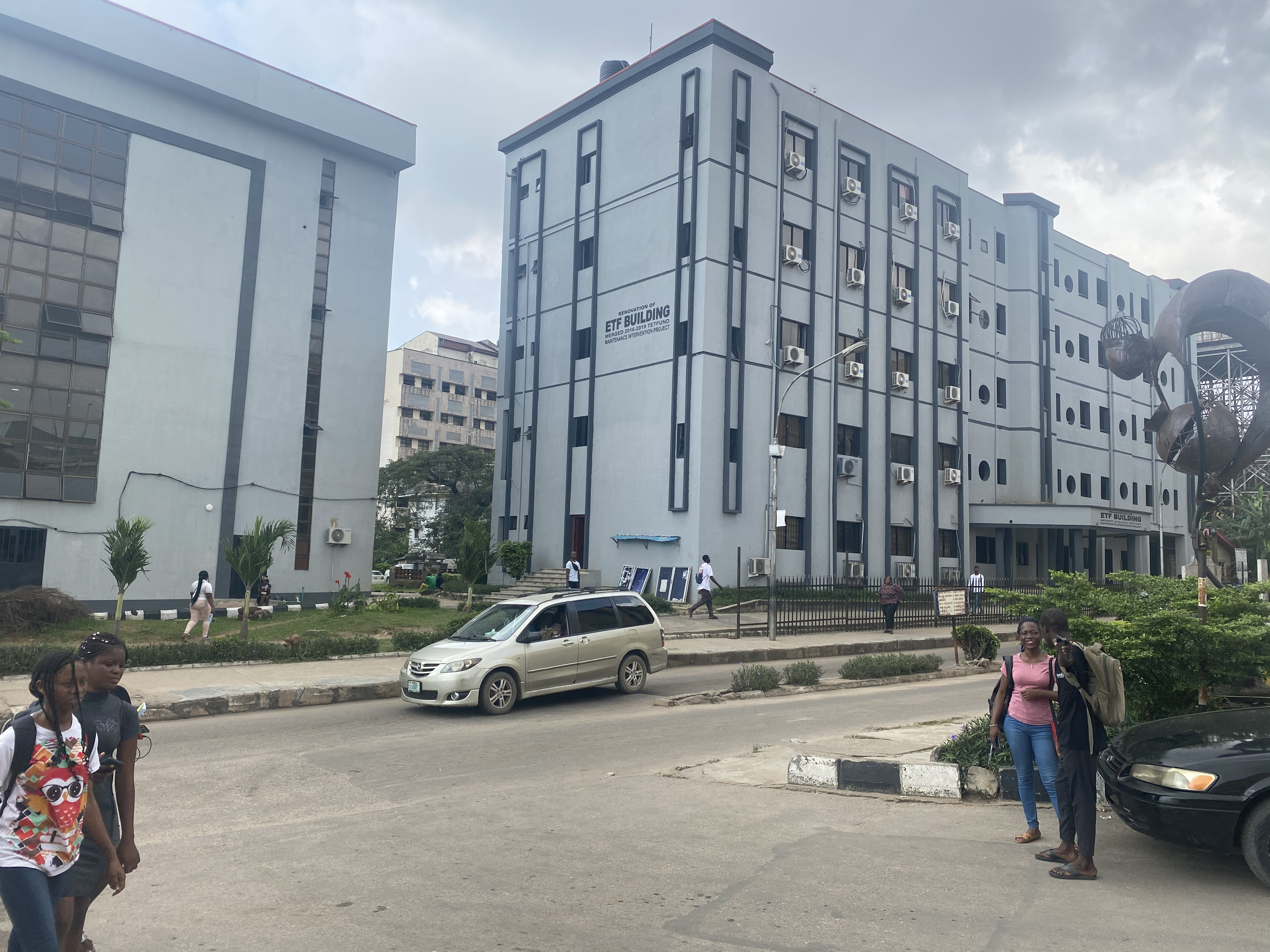
New Building, Yabatech

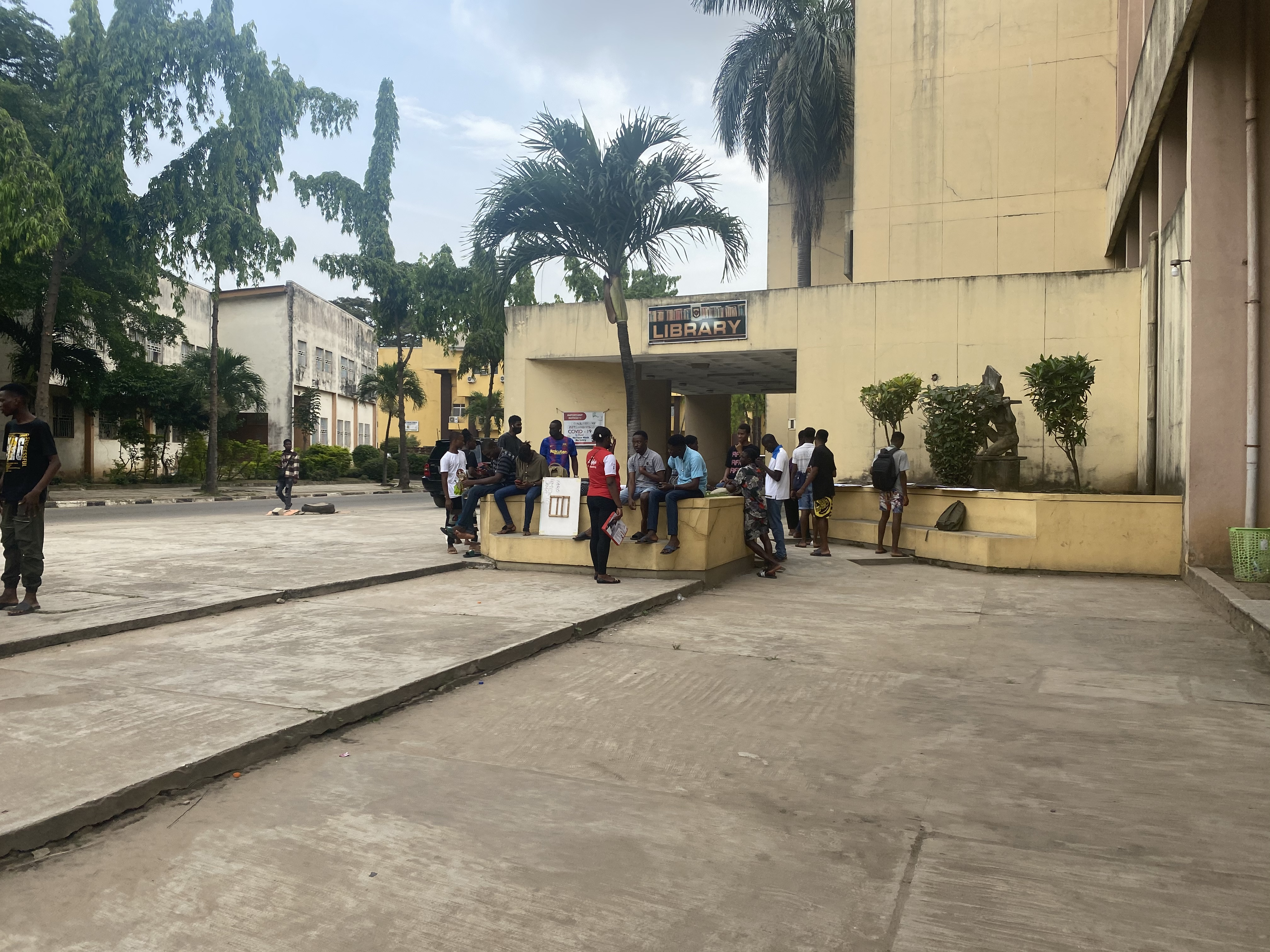
Yabatech Library

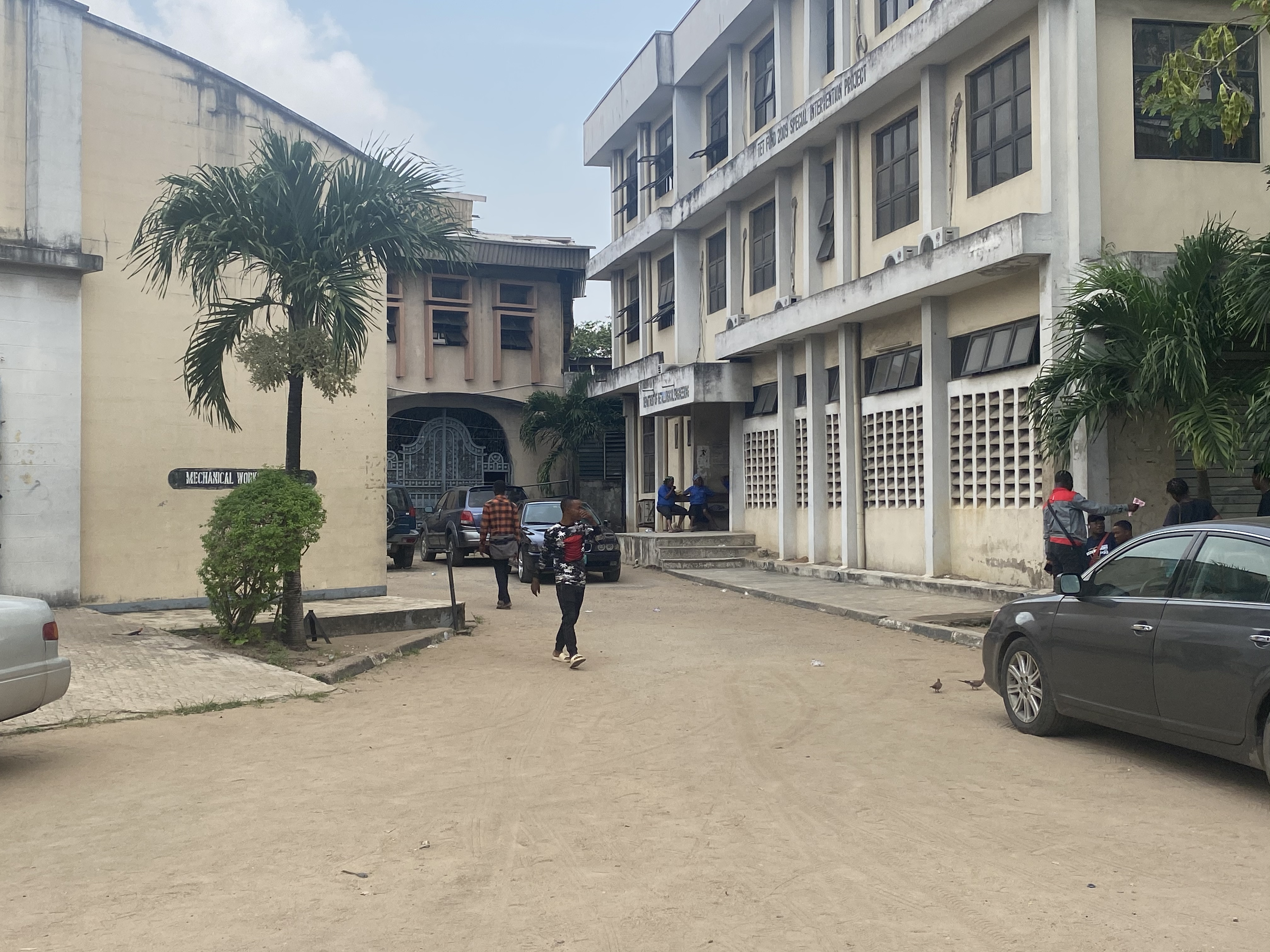
Mechanical workshop, Yabatech

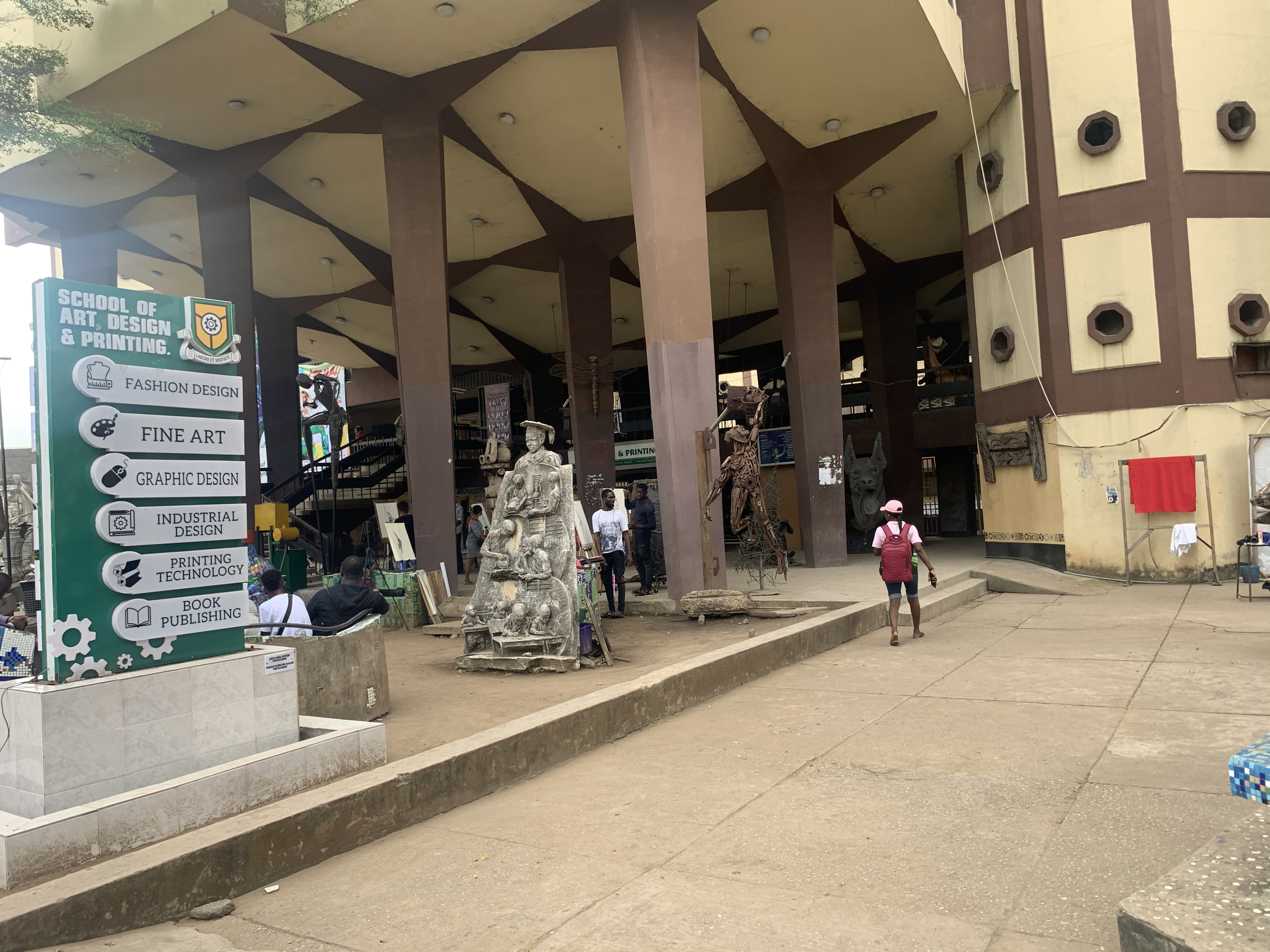
School of Art, Design and Printing, YabaTech 2

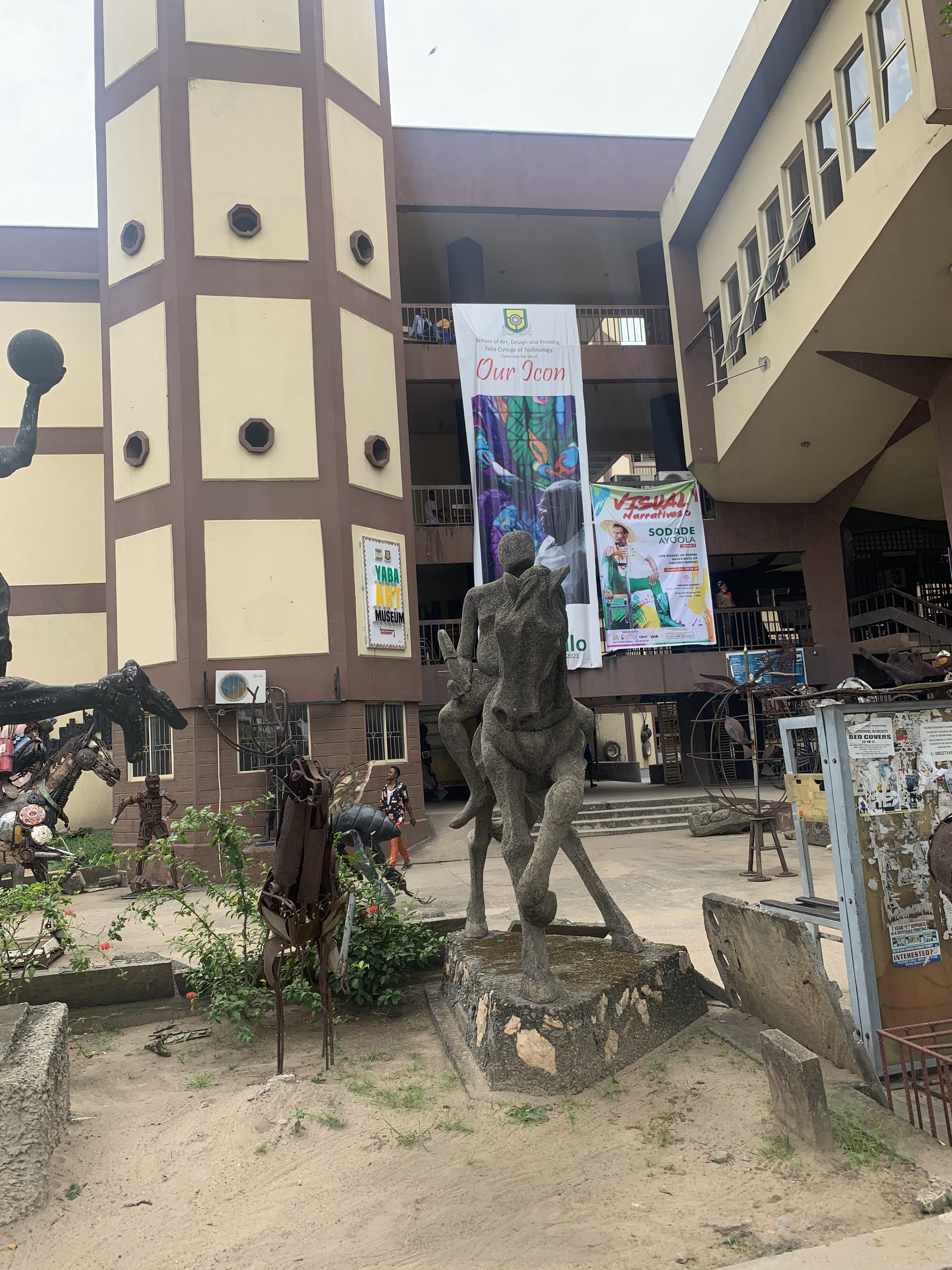
School of Art, Design and Printing, YabaTech

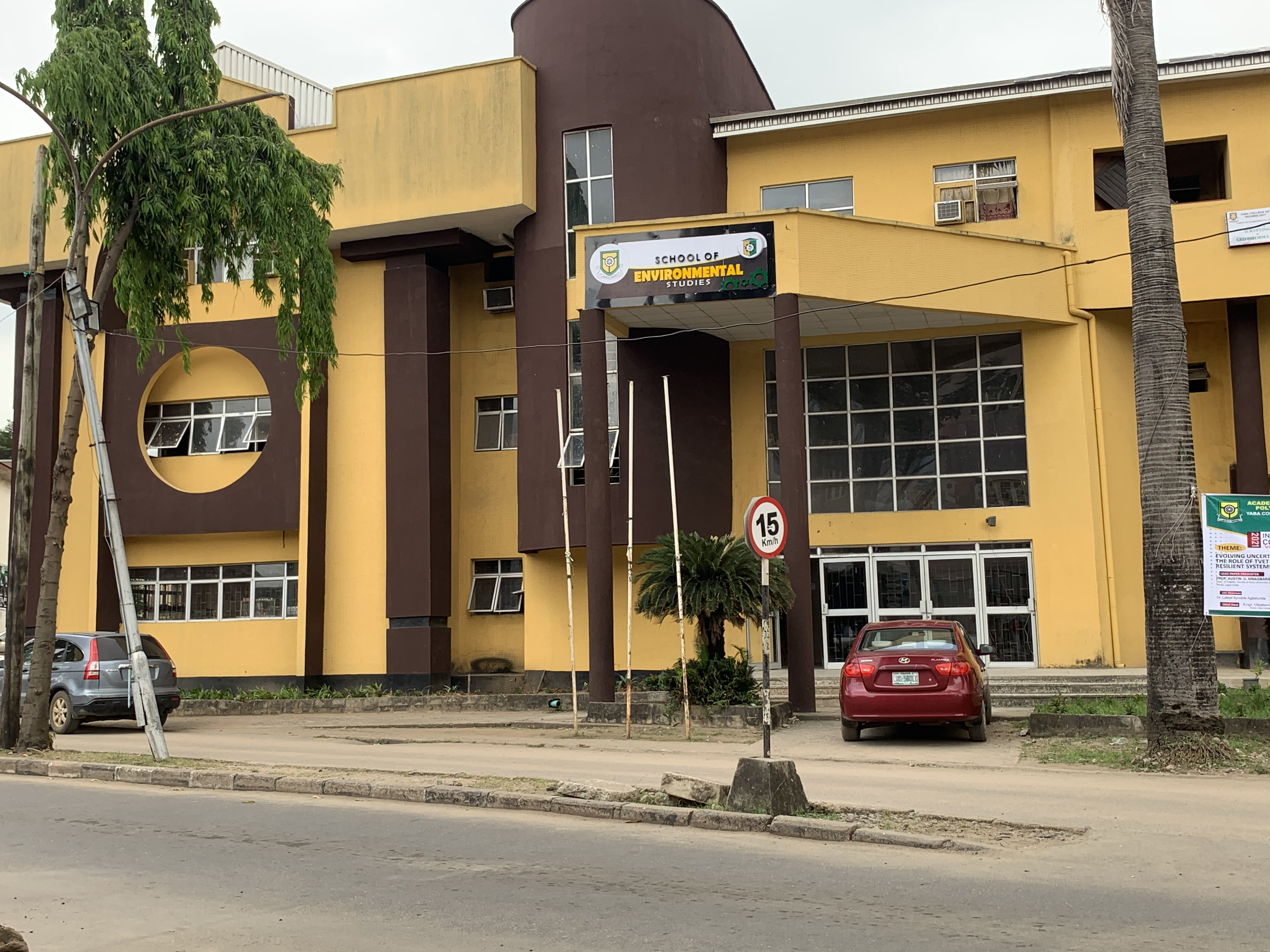
School of environmental studiesSchool of environmental studies, YabaTech

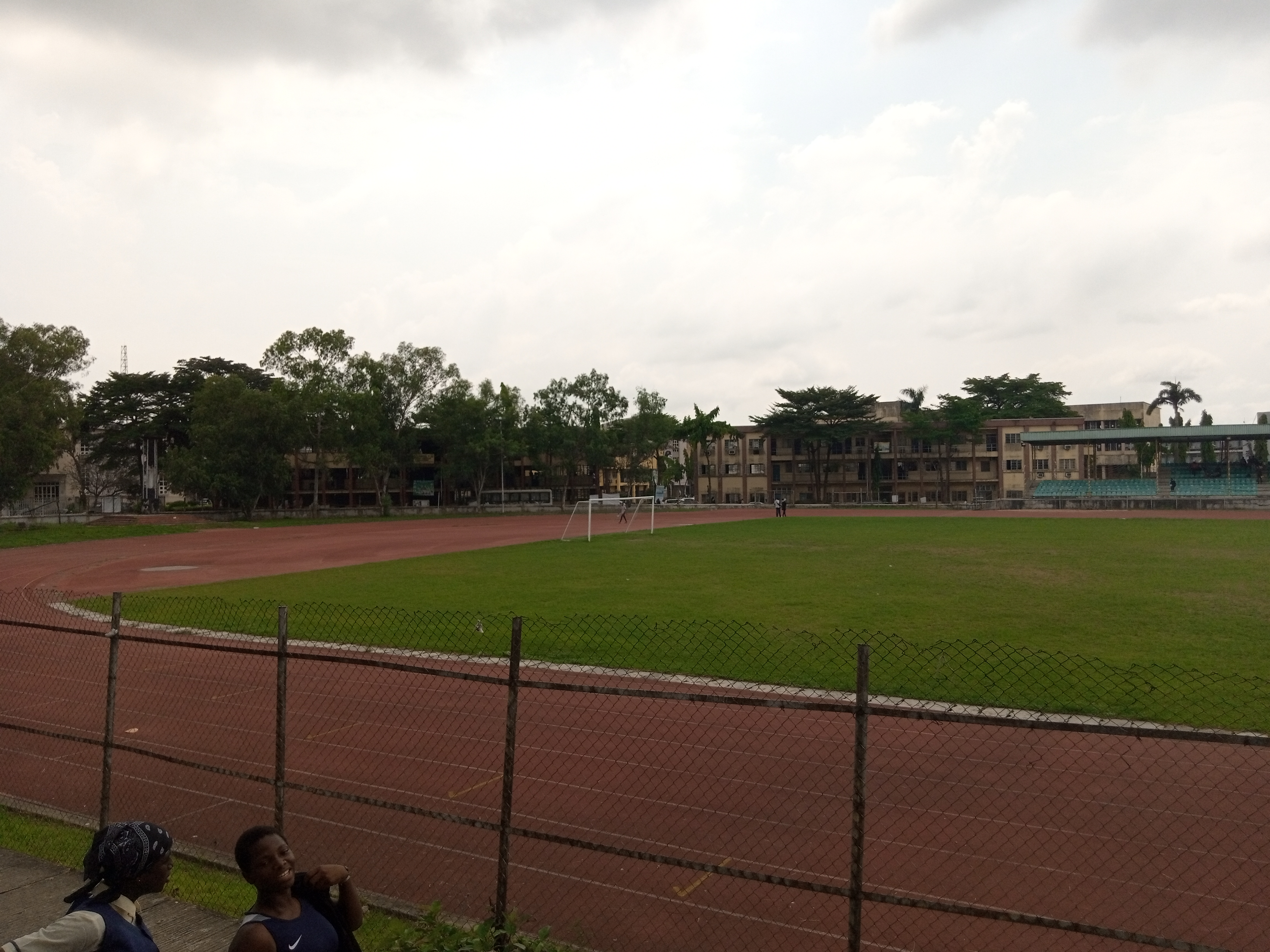
Dr Philip Adegbile Sport Complex, Yaba Tech 2

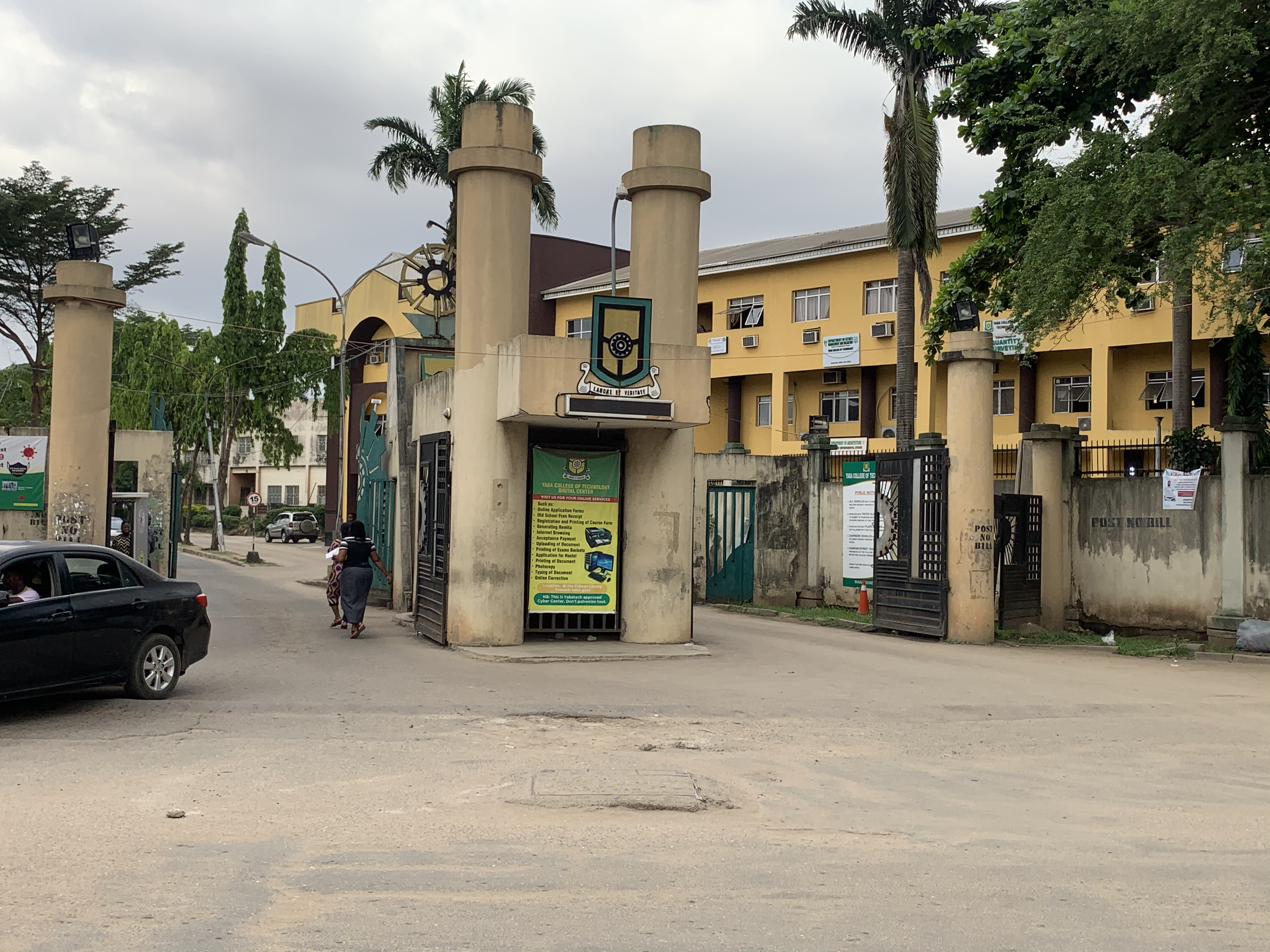
Yaba Tech second gate

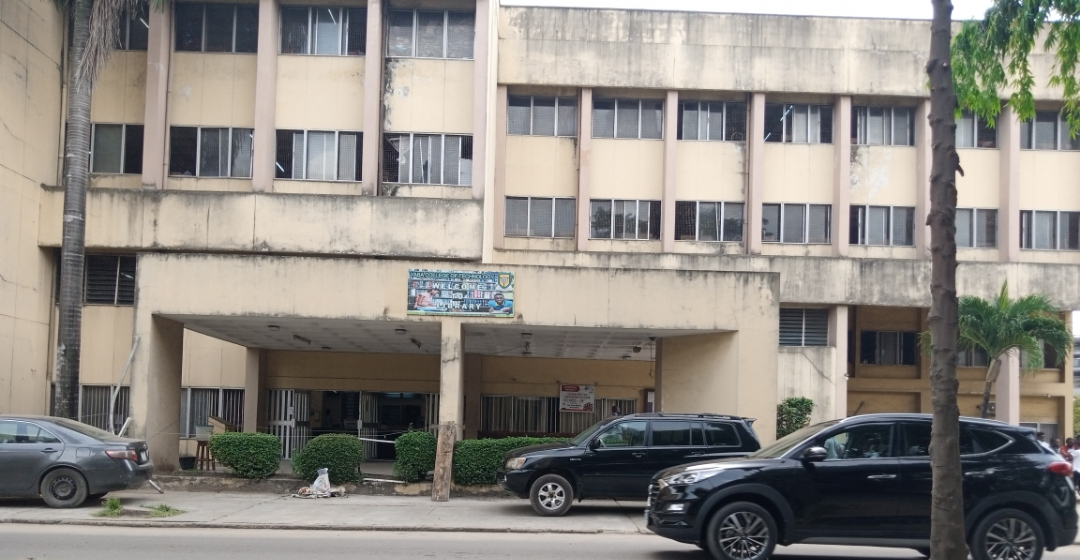
YabaTech Library

== See also ==
- List of polytechnics in Nigeria
- Yaba Higher College alumni
