= Seun Bamiro =

Nigerian fashion entrepreneur

- Education: Higher National Diploma (HnD), Lagos State Polytechnic
- Occupations: Fashion designer, Entrepreneur
- Years active: 2011–present
- Known for: Founder Of Ynorth Wears

Seun Babalola Bamiro is a Nigerian fashion entrepreneur and chief executive officer at Ynorth Wears, a Nigerian fashion company and one of the biggest producers of made in Nigeria wears.
