= Nigeria Polytechnic Games Association =

- Status: Active
- Genre: Sporting event
- Frequency: Biennial
- Location: Various
- Country: Nigeria
- Inaugurated: 10 April 1976

Nigeria Polytechnic Games Association, often stylized as NIPOGA Games, is a biennial sporting competition involving all accredited polytechnics and colleges of technology in Nigeria. In 2017, the Minister for Sports, Solomon Dalung, was accorded as patron for the games, which saw 81 polytechnics participate in it. According to the organizers, the games were created to ensure peaceful co-existence among Nigerians and to discover and nurture sporting talents for national assignments. Yaba College of Technology is the most successful institution in the competition, having won the most gold medals on seven occasions, the latest being in 2014.

== Winners by medals table ==
The number of gold medals won in the competition are written in parentheses.

Date	Host	Champions	Runners-up	Third place
2017 (19th edition)	Federal Polytechnic, Nasarawa	Lagos State Polytechnic (16)	Federal Polytechnic, Ado-Ekiti (15)	Yaba College of Technology (10)
2014 (18th edition)	Federal Polytechnic, Bida	Yaba College of Technology (17)	The Polytechnic, Ibadan (14)	Abia State Polytechnic (11)
2012 (17th edition)	Federal Polytechnic, Ede	Lagos State Polytechnic (18)	The Polytechnic, Ibadan (16)	Federal Polytechnic, Ede (14)
2010 (16th edition)	Nuhu Bamali Polytechnic	The Polytechnic, Ibadan		
2008 (15th edition)	Federal Polytechnic, Ado-Ekiti			
2005 (14th edition)	Federal Polytechnic, Bauchi			
2003 (13th edition)	Auchi Polytechnic			
2001 (12th edition)	Yaba College of Technology			
1999 (11th edition)	Kaduna Polytechnic	Yaba College of Technology		
1981	Kwara State Polytechnic			
