= Gbenga Ibikunle =

British–Nigerian economist

- Born: Lagos
- Education: Yaba College of Technology; University of East Anglia
- Scientific career
- Workplaces: University of Edinburgh
- Thesis: Financial market microstructure of EU emissions futures (2012)

Gbenga Ibikunle is a British–Nigerian economist who is a professor and Chair of Finance at the University of Edinburgh. He is Director of Industry, Economy and Society in the Edinburgh Futures Institute. His research considers economics and financial markets.

== Early life and education ==
Ibikunle is from Abeokuta. He became interested in economics as a child, and spent his spare time reading The Economist. His father worked in the Nigeria Customs Service in Lagos, and his mother encouraged him to read whilst she looked after his sister. As a high achieving student in the Nigerian school system, Ibikunle was encouraged to pursue the sciences, and eventually studied food technology at the Yaba College of Technology. He started working in management, and was made a Senior Manager at Mega Chicken, a fast-food company that was gaining traction in Nigeria. In the first year of his management, the company turnover was over £1m. The 2008 financial crisis motivated Ibikunle to study abroad, and he moved to the University of East Anglia to complete a Master of Business Administration. He then completed a doctorate on market microstructure. His doctoral research considered the financial market surrounding European Union Emissions Trading System. He looked to understand the motivations of economic agents. He became interested in the interplay between research and policy, and his research was well received by European officials, including Connie Hedegaard.

== Research and career ==
Ibikunle was appointed to the faculty at the University of Edinburgh, where he was made a professor and Chair of Finance in 2020. Ibikunle studies the microstructure of financial markets. He studies how the microstructure of markets evolves under technological and policy-based innovation. He spent 2016 as a visiting researcher at the Financial Conduct Authority. In 2018, he was made Director of Industry, Economy and Society at the Edinburgh Futures Institute. In 2023, he was made co-director of the NatWest–Edinburgh centre or Purpose-Driven Innovation in Banking.

== Awards and honours ==
- Director of Industry, Economy and Society at the Edinburgh Futures Institute
- Member of the World Economic Forum Global Future Council

== Selected publications ==
- Ibikunle, Gbenga; Steffen, Tom (2015-09-07). "European Green Mutual Fund Performance: A Comparative Analysis with their Conventional and Black Peers". Journal of Business Ethics. 145 (2): 337–355. doi:10.1007/s10551-015-2850-7. hdl:20.500.11820/d7f1d98d-3798-4e1e-9066-33c6593ee52d. ISSN 0167-4544. S2CID 254369729.
- Aguirre, Mariana; Ibikunle, Gbenga (2014-06-01). "Determinants of renewable energy growth: A global sample analysis" (PDF). Energy Policy. 69: 374–384. doi:10.1016/j.enpol.2014.02.036. ISSN 0301-4215. S2CID 55124778.
- Ibikunle, Gbenga; Gregoriou, Andros; Hoepner, Andreas G.F.; Rhodes, Mark (December 2016). "Liquidity and market efficiency in the world's largest carbon market". The British Accounting Review. 48 (4): 431–447. doi:10.1016/j.bar.2015.11.001. hdl:20.500.11820/c4c4cd26-7955-46cb-b989-1331af2ee12d. ISSN 0890-8389.
- Ibikunl, Gbenga; Gregoriou, Andros (2018). Carbon Markets: Microstructure, Pricing and Policy (1 ed.). Palgrave Macmillan. ISBN 978-3-319-72847-6.
