= Lagos State University of Science and Technology =

Public university in Ikorodu, Nigeria

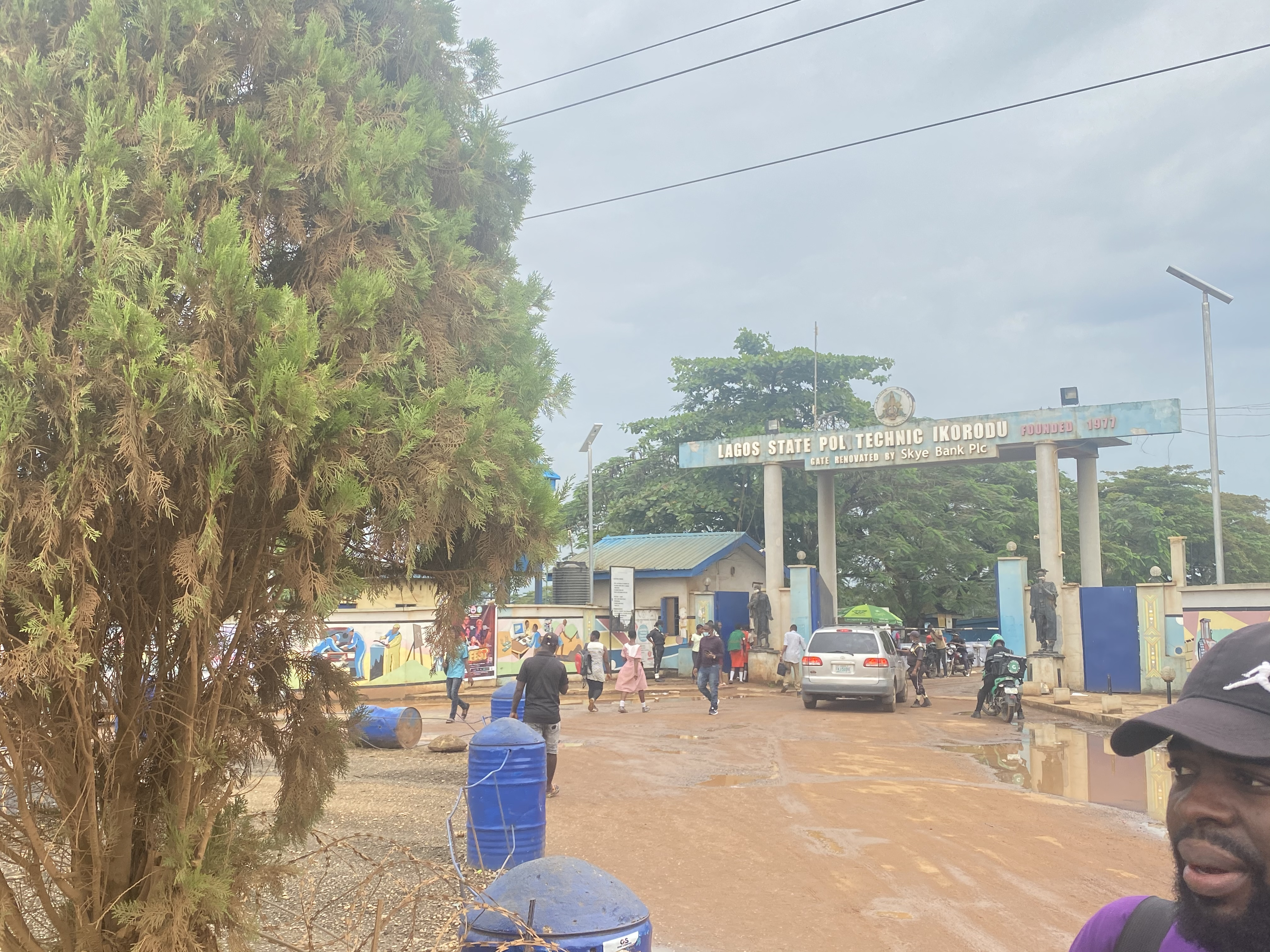
- Motto: Mission and Professionalism
- Type: Public
- Established: 1977
- Vice-Chancellor: Professor Olumuyiwa O. Odusanya
- Academic staff: Above 1200
- Students: 6,000
- Location: Ikorodu, Lagos State, Nigeria
- Campus: Ikorodu, Isolo, Surulere
- Colors: Red and blue
- Website: lasustech.edu.ng

Lagos State University of Science and Technology is a government-owned tertiary institution located in Ikorodu, Lagos State, Nigeria. The institution was formerly known as Lagos State College of Science and Technology (LACOSTECH) and later changed to Lagos State Polytechnic (LASPOTECH) before assuming its current name.

== History ==
The Lagos State University of Science and Technology (formerly known as Lagos State Polytechnic) opened in January 1978 at a temporary site (now the Isolo Campus) with five Departments: Accountancy, Business administration, Banking and finance, Marketing and Insurance.

On 1 August 1978, the School of Agriculture in Ikorodu was merged with the Institution became the nucleus of the permanent site at Ikorodu. In 1986, the Lagos State Government changed the name of the Institution from Lagos State College of Science and technology, (LACOSTECH) to Lagos State Polytechnic (LASPOTECH). It became a university of science and technology in February 2022.

== Notable alumni ==
- Adekunle Gold
- Iyabo Ojo
- Seun Bamiro

== Architectures and monuments ==
Campus

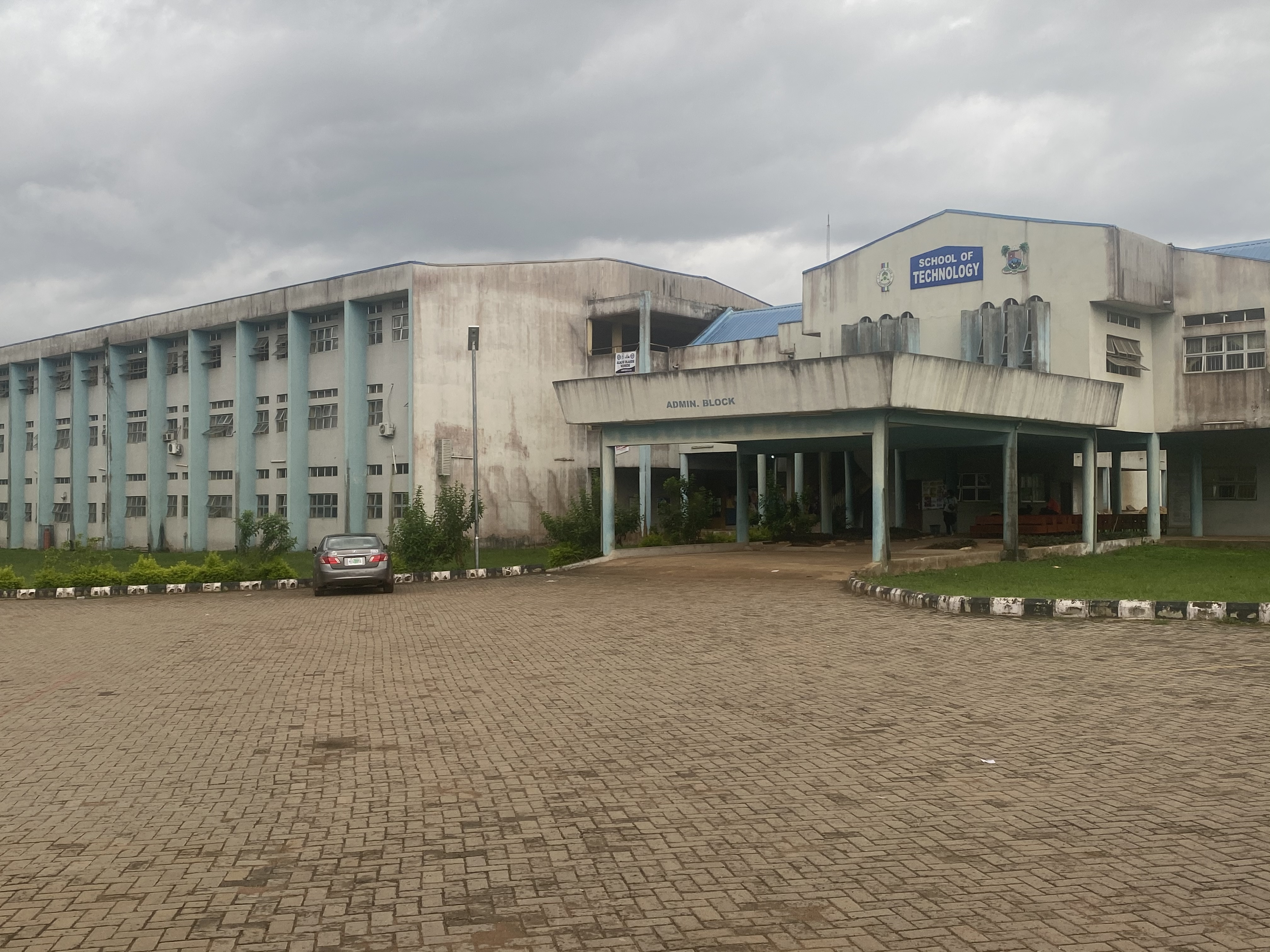
School of Technology

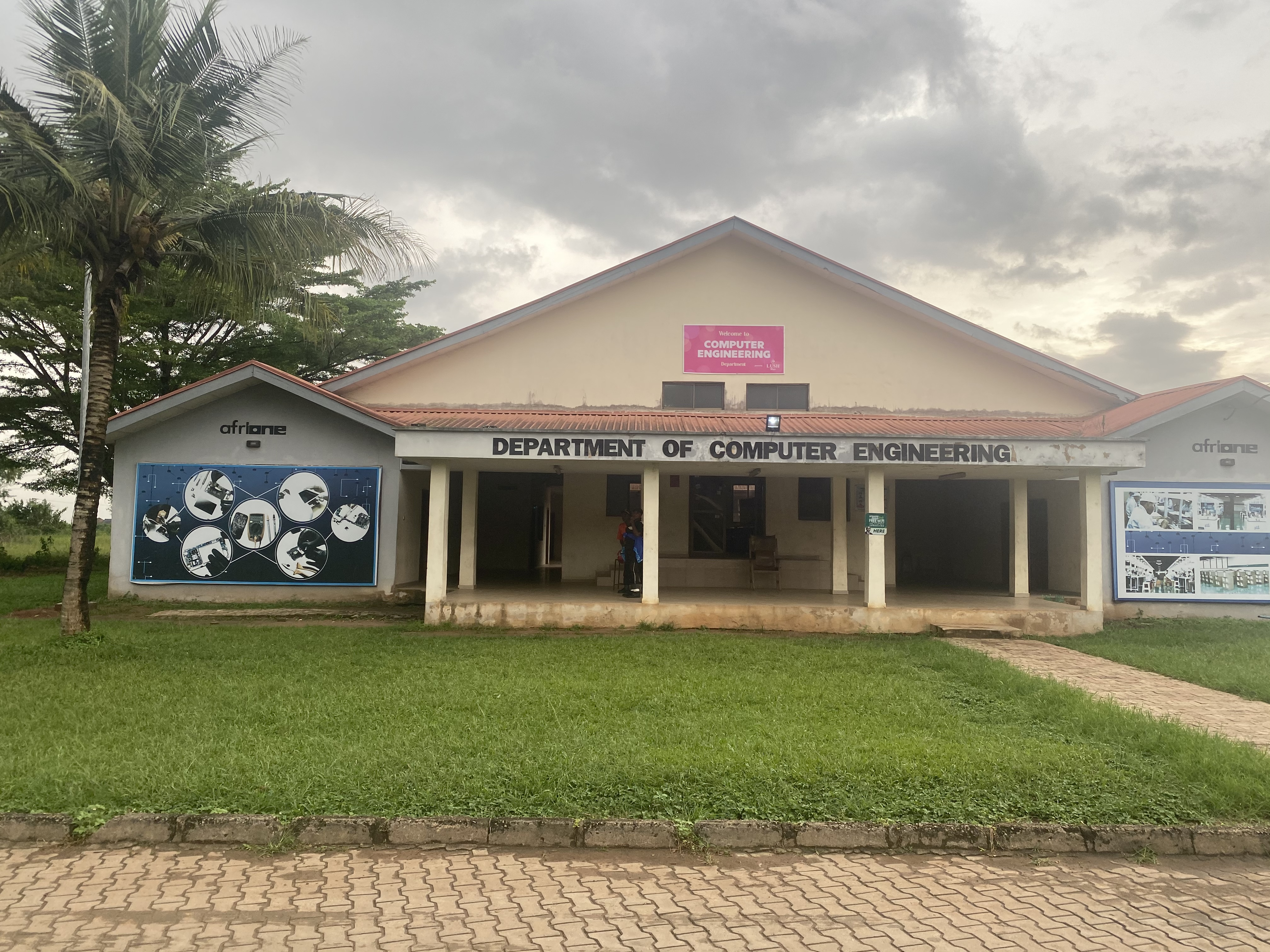
Department of Computer Engineering

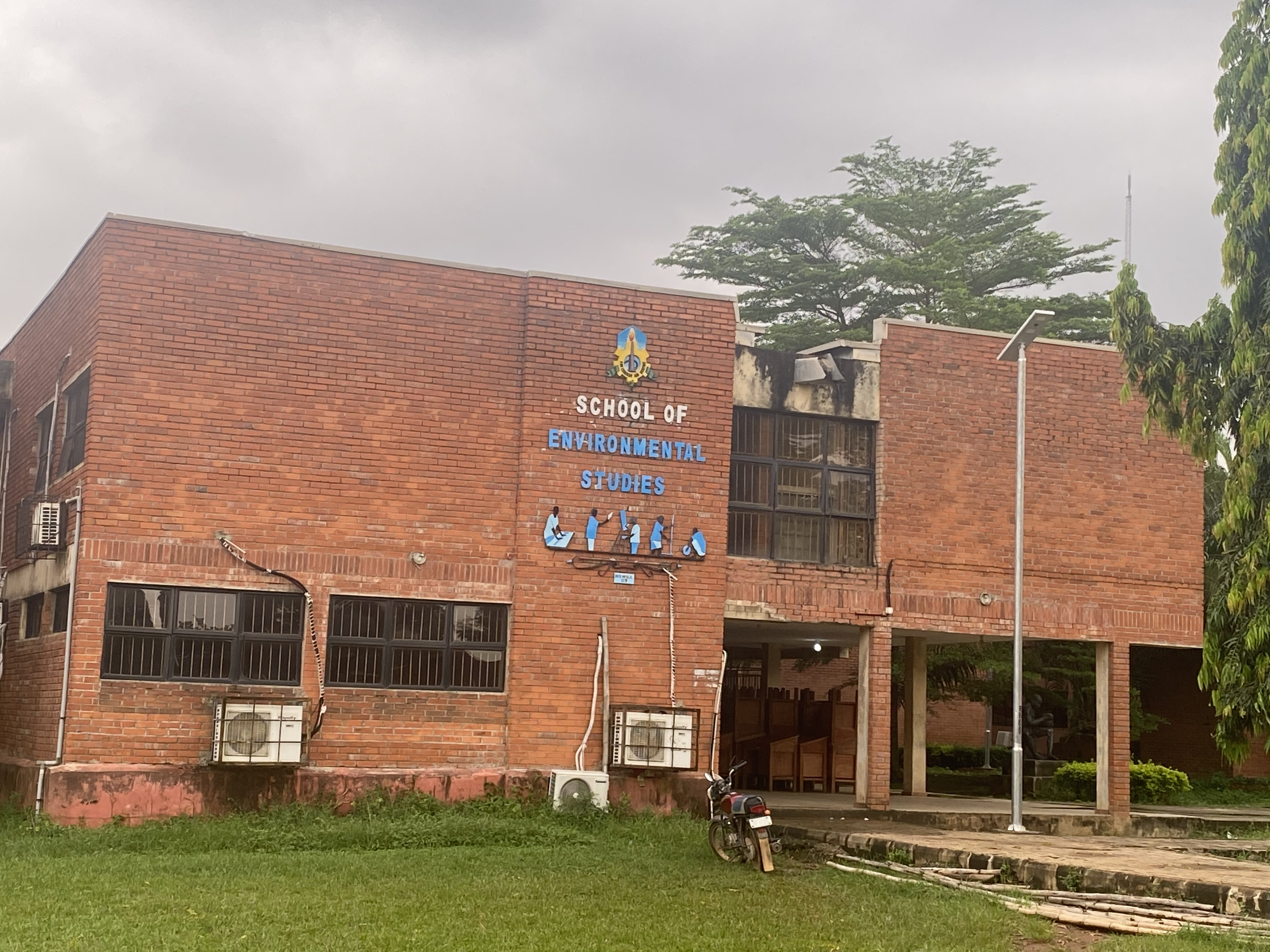
School of Environmental Studies

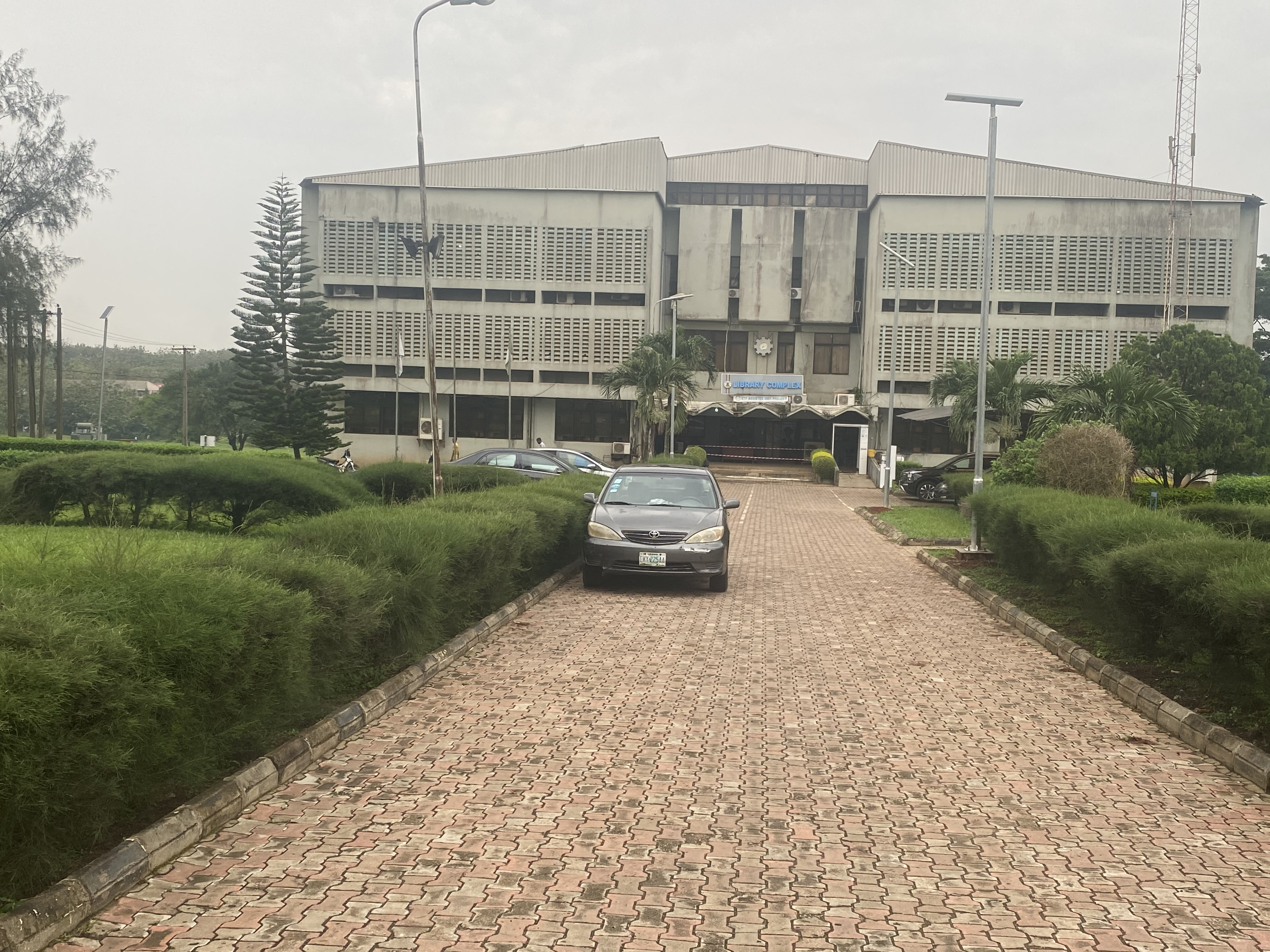
Laspotech Library Complex

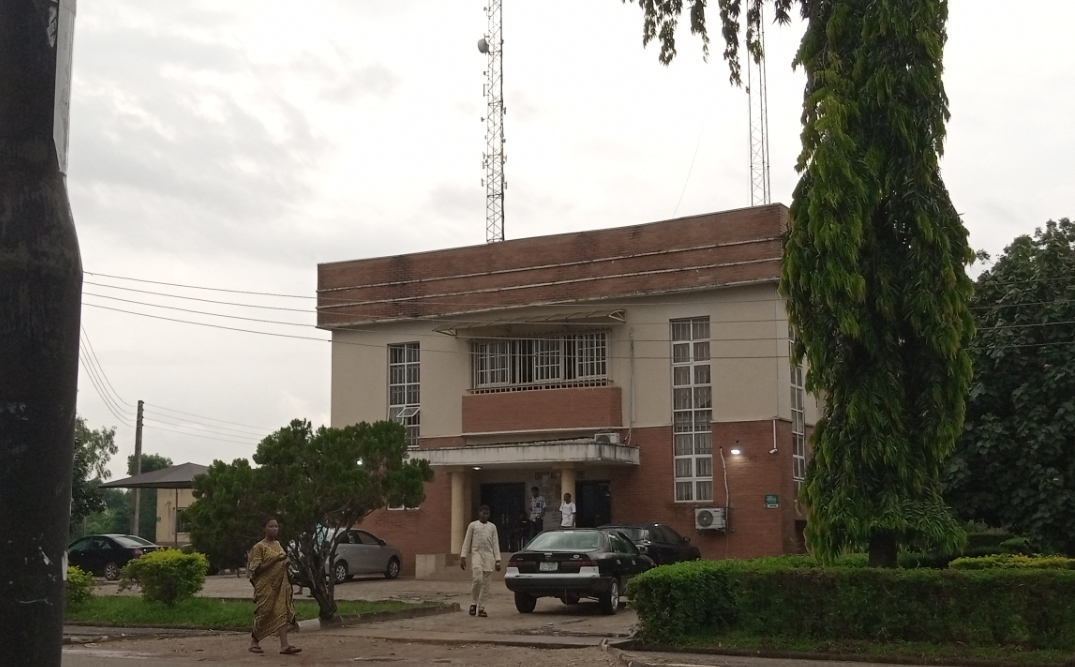
Laspotech ICT center

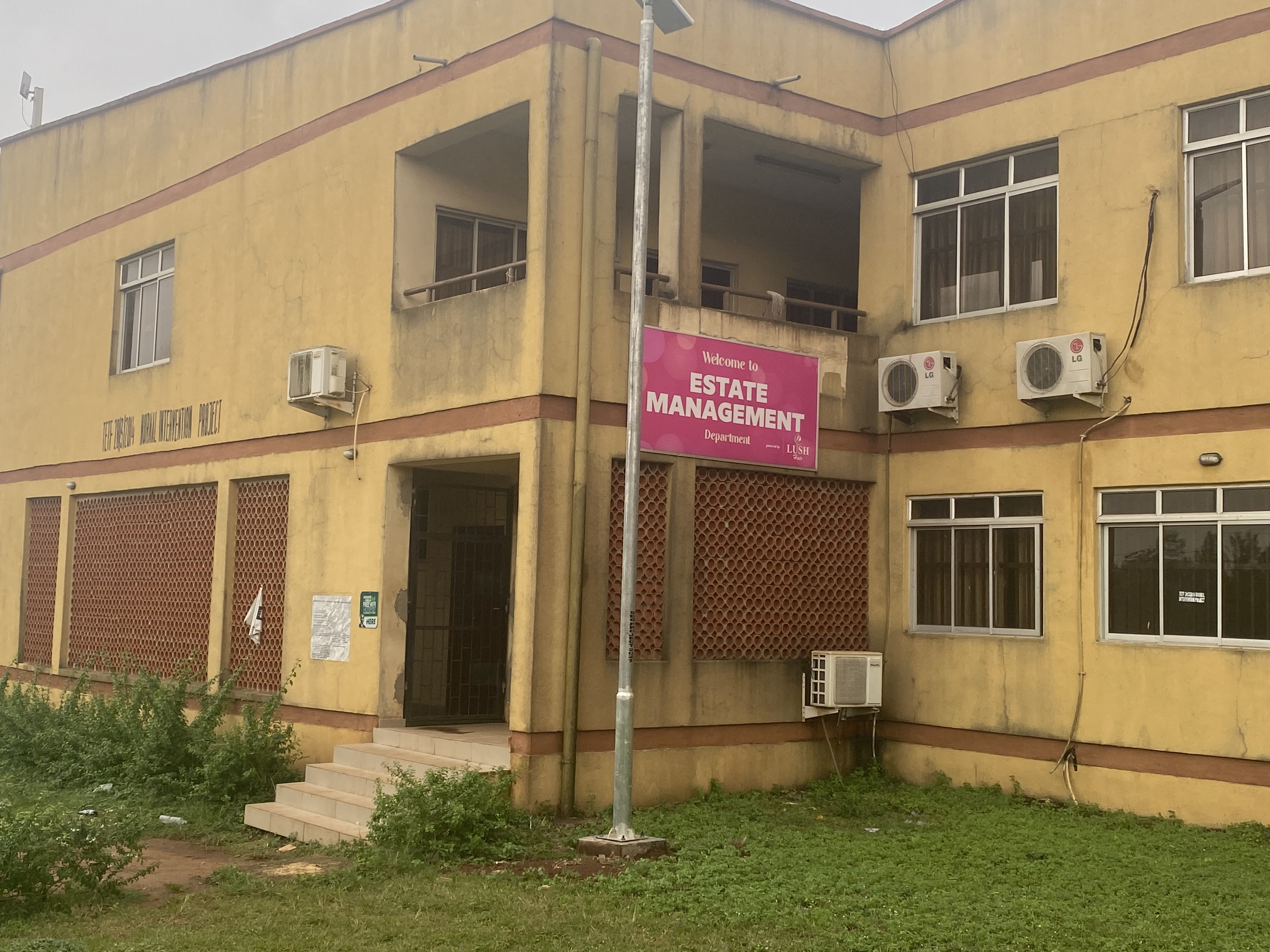
Estate Management Department, Ikorodu

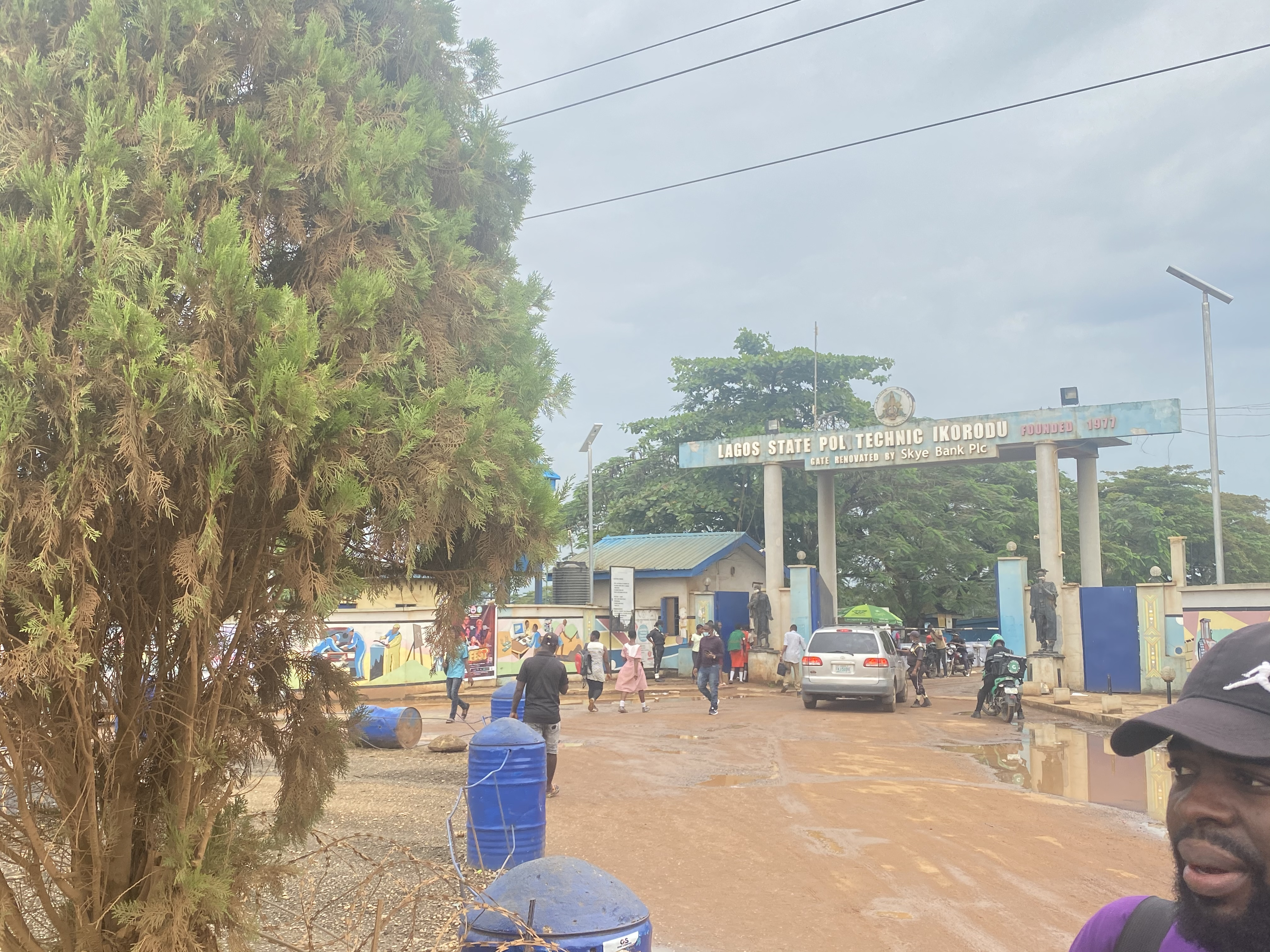
Lagos state polytechnic, Ikorodu

== See also ==
- List of universities in Nigeria
