= Organised crime in Nigeria =

Transnational drug-trafficking organisation

Organised crime in Nigeria or Nigerian mafia
- Founding location: Nigeria
- Years active: 1980s–present
- Territory: Nigeria, Africa, Europe, Canada, United States
- Ethnicity: Nigerians
- Membership: 30,000 full members 300,000 associates
- Activities: scams, drug trafficking, drug production, money laundering, arms trafficking, human smuggling, trafficking in human beings for sexual exploitation, prostitution exploitation, illegal waste smuggling, murder, kidnapping, corruption
- Allies: Black Axe, Neo Black Movement of Africa, and other Confraternities in Nigeria

Organised crime in Nigeria includes activities by fraudsters, bandits (such as looting and kidnappings on major highways), drug traffickers and racketeers, which have spread across Western Africa. Nigerian criminal gangs rose to prominence in the 1980s, owing much to the globalisation of the world's economies and the high level of lawlessness and corruption in the country.

== Structure ==
Crime organisations in Nigeria typically do not follow the mafia-type model followed by other groups. They appear to be less formal and more organised along familial and ethnic lines, thus making them less susceptible to infiltration from law enforcement. Police investigations are further hampered by the fact there are at least 250 distinct ethnic languages in Nigeria. Other criminal gangs from Nigeria appear to be smaller-scale freelance operations. Groups from Benin City are especially notorious for human trafficking.

=== Area Boys ===
Area Boys (also known as Agberos) are loosely organised gangs of street children and teenagers, composed mostly of males, who roam the streets of Lagos, Lagos State in Nigeria. They extort money from passers-by, public transporters and traders, sell illegal drugs, act as informal security guards, and perform other "odd jobs" in return for compensation.

One of the methods Area Boys use for extortion is to surround pedestrians, drivers, and passengers in vehicles, which are stuck in traffic, and force them to pay for some actual or fictitious service before letting them go. To aid in collecting money during traffic jams, the area boys place nails in the road and dig up the streets. Among the Area Boys are both sellers and users of illegal drugs. A study states "most of them use drugs (cocaine, heroin, marijuana, etc.) either as occasional users or addicts, or as peddlers." Of 77 respondents to a survey, 12.2% dealt drugs, while 60.3% were addicts themselves. Sale of drugs takes place both in Nigeria and abroad, and sales abroad have earned a small percentage of the sellers significant amounts of money.

=== Confraternities ===
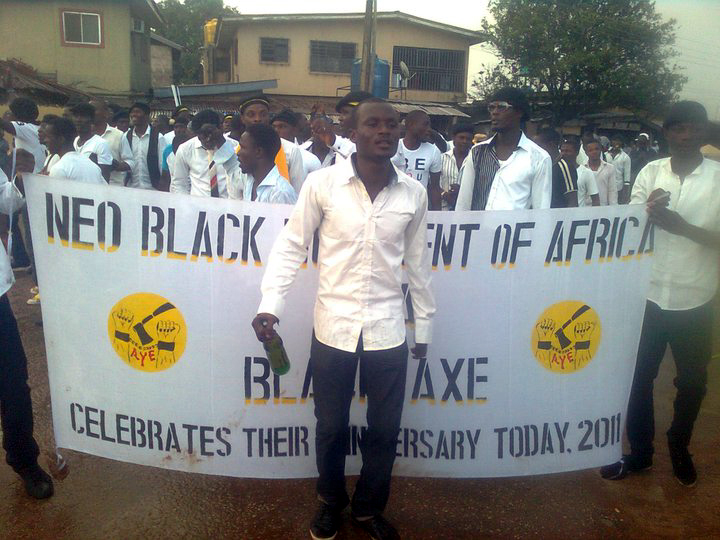
The Neo Black Movement often claim to be entirely unrelated to Black Axe in public statements, however the symbol is shown on their posters.

Highly organised Nigerian confraternities/campus gangs operate worldwide. For example, the Neo Black Movement of Africa. In its own words, the Neo Black Movement of Africa is a "registered non-partisan, non-religious and non-tribal organisation that sincerely seek to revive, retain and modify where necessary those aspects of African culture that would provide vehicles of progress for Africa and her peoples". Nonetheless, law enforcement officials who have investigated members in recent years, for example in Canada, the UK and Italy are convinced that the movement has strayed far from its original path.

Behind the welfare facade of the Neo Black Movement hides indeed the most dreaded Nigerian campus cult, the Black Axe confraternity. NBM usually state that they are not identical with Black Axe for propaganda purposes. While the atrocities committed by campus cult members are well-known, very little is known about other activities of the Neo Black Movement. Offiong claims that the group's initial goal of promoting Black Consciousness and fighting for the dignity of Africans and their freedom from neo-colonialism has deteriorated into self-serving behaviour that is "notoriously and brutally violent". He maintains that violence has in fact become the cult's official policy.

Apart from the atrocities in the orbit of NBM, most members of the confraternity are involved in fraud and cyber crime. The main reason to join the confraternity is (besides the pressure and intimidation that is applied to students to join) the fact that the confraternity has infiltrated all spheres of Nigerian society and serves the main purpose of helping its members climb the career ladder and going unpunished for their crimes by means of their nepotistic structure.

Investigations and a number of arrests of members of NBM by the Italian police brought to light various crimes committed by members of NBM. NBM and other cults were found guilty of smuggling drugs, extortion, fraud, prostitution, passport falsification, credit card cloning, and various forms of cybercrime such as Business Email Compromise (BEC).

In 2011, eight more members of NBM were arrested in Italy for the same offences mentioned above. They are referred to as an international criminal organisation and Nigerian Mafia. According to internal documents, the confraternity helps members to immigrate illegally to Europe. Nigerian fraud rings have been exported to Europe, America, and Asia (see external links section). In 2015 a sophisticated car theft ring run by the Black Axe organised crime ring was busted in Toronto, Canada. The ring had stolen more than 500 luxury cars in one year, valued at 30 million US dollars.

According to the police, the Nigerians are increasing their alliances with the Neapolitan Camorra and the Sicilian Mafia, the alliances are most regarded to prostitution, drugs and human trafficking business.

== Activities ==
=== Fraud ===
An advance-fee scam is a form of fraud and one of the most common types of confidence tricks. The scam typically involves promising the victim a significant share of a large sum of money, in return for a small up-front payment, which the fraudster requires in order to obtain the large sum. If a victim makes the payment, the fraudster either invents a series of further fees for the victim or simply disappears.

=== Drug trafficking ===
Nigerian criminal groups are heavily involved in drug trafficking, shipping heroin from Asian countries to Europe and America; and cocaine from South America to Europe and South Africa. The large numbers of ethnic Nigerians in countries like India and Thailand give their gangs ready access to around 90% of the world's heroin.

In the United States, Nigerian drug traffickers are important distributors of heroin, importing it into the country to distribution level and selling it to lower-level street gangs. These criminal groups are also known to launder drug money through domestic football clubs in the Nigeria Premier League, and are rumoured to make additional money through match fixing activity within football matches.

=== Human trafficking and kidnappings ===
Nigeria is a source, transit, and destination country for women and children subjected to trafficking in persons including forced labour and forced prostitution. Trafficked Nigerian women and children are recruited from rural areas within Nigeria - women and girls for involuntary domestic servitude and sexual exploitation, and boys for forced labour in street vending, domestic servitude, mining, and begging.

Nigerian women and children are taken from Nigeria to other West and Central African countries, primarily Gabon, Cameroon, Ghana, Chad, Benin, Togo, Niger, Burkina Faso, and the Gambia, for the same purposes. Children from West African states like Benin, Togo, and Ghana – where Economic Community of West African States (ECOWAS) rules allow for easy entry – are also forced to work in Nigeria, and some are subjected to hazardous jobs in Nigeria's granite mines. Nigerian women and girls are taken to Europe, especially to Italy and Russia, and to the Middle East and North Africa, for forced prostitution.

== Impact ==
According to the FBI, Nigerian criminal enterprises are the most notable of all African criminal enterprises. They are considered to be among the most aggressive and expansionist international criminal groups, operating in more than 80 countries of the world and are established on all populated continents of the world. Their most profitable activity is drug trafficking, though they are more famous for their financial fraud which costs the US alone approximately US$1 to 2 billion annually.

== Nigerian organised crime in other countries ==
=== Canada ===
Police in Toronto became aware of the presence of the Black Axe gang in 2013. The gang exerts influence over Canada's Nigerian expatriate community and is predominantly involved in scamming. Authorities estimate the Black Axe's membership in the country at approximately two-hundred.

=== France ===
The Nigerian mafia in France is involved in the sex trafficking of Nigerian women and girls, as well as heroin trafficking, in which they have collaborated with Chinese triads and other groups.

=== Germany ===
The Nigerian mafia is responsible for the smuggling and pimping of the majority of the African women working as prostitutes in Germany.

=== India ===
Nigerians are among the major players in the narcotics trade in Goa and Mumbai. The coast of north Goa provides an entry point of South American cocaine for Nigerian traffickers, who have come into conflict with Indian gangs.

=== Ireland ===
Nigerian dealers are credited with introducing crack cocaine to Ireland in the early 2000s. Europol have identified Nigerian organised crime gangs as being responsible for trafficking children from Nigeria to Ireland for work in the sex trade. Nigerian gangs are also involved in the cannabis trade, using contacts in South Africa to smuggle the drugs into Ireland via couriers and through parcels, as well as in fraud and money laundering rings.

=== Italy ===
Nigerian mafia in Italy
- Mafia Nigeriana
- Years active: 2000s–present
- Territory: Castel Volturno (initial headquarters) but currently in the main Italian cities.
- Ethnicity: Nigerians and various West African and Central African nationalities
- Membership: 3,000 full members 10,000 associates of various West African and Central African nationalities
- Activities: drug trafficking, drug production, money laundering, arms trafficking, human smuggling, trafficking in human beings for sexual exploitation, prostitution exploitation, illegal waste smuggling, murder, kidnapping, corruption

The Nigerian mafia has a strong presence throughout Italy. Castel Volturno in Campania is considered the headquarters of the Nigerian mafia in Europe. The country is used as a hub by the Nigerian mafia for the trafficking of cocaine from South America, heroin from Asia and women from Africa. Nigerian gangs have established partnerships with local organised crime groups and have adopted the structure and operational methods of Italian crime syndicates. The Nigerian mafia pays tribute (a percentage of its profits from criminal rackets) to the Camorra and Sicilian Mafia. In Palermo, a group of drug dealers linked to the Neo-Black Movement were convicted as members of a "mafialike organization" in 2018.

In January 2025, the Italian police dismantled a drug trafficking scheme between a Nigerian crime group and the historic Capriati clan in the city of Bari in the region of Apulia. The alliance between the two organisations aimed to supply drugs to Capriati affiliates who sold it in the nightclubs of the zones of influence of the clan.

=== Japan ===
The Nigerian mafia in Tokyo engages in heroin dealing with the yakuza, the prostitution of Filipino women, money laundering, car theft and arranging fake marriages, amongst other crimes. Following a number of incidents at Nigerian-owned bars in which patrons were drugged and robbed, the United States embassy in Japan issued a warning to US citizens to avoid certain bars and clubs in Roppongi.

=== South Africa ===
Nigerian organised crime groups established roots in South Africa in the mid-1990s following the end of apartheid, and operate primarily in Johannesburg, Cape Town and Durban. Nigerians were initially involved in the crack cocaine trade, before moving into powder cocaine after establishing contacts in South America. Hillbrow in Johannesburg was a stronghold for the Nigerian mafia for many years. After arriving in Cape Town, Nigerian syndicates operated drug and prostitution rackets in the affluent suburb of Sea Point before they were forced out by the police and neighbourhood watch. They subsequently moved onto the city's northern suburbs and dominate the Milnerton area.

=== Thailand ===
Nigerian drug trafficking organisations began operating in Thailand as early as the late 1980s, using the nation as a base for trafficking heroin to other Asian countries, such as Hong Kong and Taiwan, and then onward to the United States and Europe.

== See also ==
- Confraternities in Nigeria
- Crime in Nigeria
- Obafemi Awolowo University massacre
