= Obafemi Awolowo University massacre =

Nigerian mass murder in 1999

- Location: 7.5183°N 4.5227°E; Obafemi Awolowo University, Ile-Ife, Osun State, Nigeria
- Date: July 10, 1999
- Weapons: Shotguns, axes
- Deaths: 5
- Injuries: 11
- Perpetrator: Black Axe (organized crime group)

The Obafemi Awolowo University massacre was the mass murder of students of Obafemi Awolowo University in Ile-Ife, Osun State, Nigeria on 10 July 1999. Five students of OAU were killed and eleven injured.

The massacre was perpetrated by an organized death squad of 40 members from the Black Axe Confraternity branch at the OAU. The perpetrators invaded Awolowo Hall at the university at around 4:30 A.M., armed with shotguns and hatchets used against students.

== Background ==
Cult violence on university campuses in Nigeria increased in the 1980s due to university employment and sponsorship of campus cults. Several university campuses employed cult-based militias in response to the Structural Adjustment Programme (SAP) enacted in 1986. The militias were used to repress the resistance of students against commercialization of education and other classist policies. A majority of militia members originated from upper and middle-class families who held a neutral position on the classist government and university management being enacted.

=== 7 March incident ===
Prior to the massacre, an incident took place on 7 March 1999 involving the Black Axe. The incident was described by OAU's vice-chancellor Roger Makanjuola in his book Water Must Flow Uphill (Adventures in University Administration):

"On Saturday, 7 March 1999, a group of Black Axe members held a meeting in Ife town. After the meeting, they drove back to the campus...[T]hey were overtaken by some students in another car. For whatever reason, they were enraged and gave chase to the students. The students, seeing them in pursuit, raced hastily to the car park outside Angola Hall and ran into the adjacent Awolowo Hall for safety. The Students' Union, which had also received information that secret cult members were gathering in a house in the senior staff quarters, mobilized in response to the incident. Led by George Iwilade, the Secretary-General, a group drove to the house...and forced their way into the boys' quarters. They found nine individuals inside, eight of them students of the university, with a submachine gun, a locally manufactured gun, an axe, a bayonet, and the black clothing and regalia of the Black Axe cult. The university authorities were informed, and the members of the Black Axe were handed over to the police."

The case was heard by a Chief Magistrate on 31 March, 1999, who discharged and acquitted all individuals involved. Student witnesses were not called to testify. The investigating officer, Corporal Femi Adewoye, claimed that the witnesses were unable to be contacted. The Chief Magistrate had also ordered that weapons located during the raid be destroyed. The acquitted students returned to OAU, to the dismay and concern of fellow students. Several suspensions were issued by the university in response to student pressure.

Several reports have suggested that the university administration failed to take appropriate action. Many student activists were reportedly expelled for making demands of the university administration, while no Black Axe members were reprimanded by the administration led by Vice-Chancellor Wale Omole.

== Perpetrators ==
The attack was carried out by members of the Neo Black Movement of Africa, also known as the Black Axe. The confraternity is known to be present within Nigerian universities, where many chapters of the group have committed violent crimes. The group has been known to intimidate students, professors, and administrators on campuses, often extorting individuals for grades or other privileges.

The Black Axe is known to be involved in the murders of at least 200 people in 2014 and other criminal activities around the world, such as international smuggling of drugs, extortion, human trafficking and prostitution, counterfeiting of identity documents, cloning of credit cards, cheque fraud, 419 fraud, robbery, rape, murder and are used by politicians as 'hired thugs'. In Italy the Black Axe is a designated mafia organization.

== Massacre ==
On the night of 9 July 1999, student groups held a party at Obafemi Awolowo University. Members of the OAU Kegite Club, and various other student led groups gathered at the open ground between Angola and Mozambique Halls of the university. Later in the night many of the party-goers began occupying the cafeteria of Awolowo Hall while others returned to their halls of residence to sleep.

That night, at around 3:00 to 3:30 AM, between 22 and 40 members of the Black Axe confraternity arrived to carry out a pre-planned assault involving the murders of several prominent members of the student union. Upon arriving at the university, the Black Axe members left their vehicles at a parking lot next to the university sports centre and went on foot to Awolowo Hall. Armed with shotguns and hatchets, the Black Axe members initiated their attack at the party. Four were killed at the scene, and another died later from gunshot wounds. Several others were injured from the attack as well as in a stampede of people attempting to escape. During the attack, Black Axe members were heard shouting the nicknames of the targeted student union members, demanding they surrender themselves.

Of the targets, Lanre "Legacy" Adeleke escaped by jumping from a balcony after hearing the gunfire. "Dexter", the Chief of the Kegites, also escaped unharmed. Law student, George "Afrika" Iwilade, the Secretary-General of the Students' Union, was shot in the head and killed, the only successfully assassinated target. Iwilade had been targeted due to his involvement in the 7 March arrests. The other four killed were incidental casualties.

Immediately following the attack, the members of the Black Axe left on foot back towards their vehicles. They then ransacked the Students' Union building, before returning to their vehicles, and leaving the university campus.

== Aftermath ==
=== Student response ===
The following afternoon, 11 July, the OAU Students' Union President Lanre Adeleke demanded the immediate resignation of Vice-Chancellor Wale Omole for his negligence in preventing the attack. An award of 10,000 nairas (equivalent to $100 USD) was offered for Omole's capture. Hundreds of students occupied the OAU administration building, refusing to leave until Omole was fired.

The OAU student-body was quickly mobilized in a search for the perpetrators. Three individuals identified as Aisekhaghe Aikhile, Emeka Ojuagu, and Frank Idahosa were quickly apprehended. Idahosa and Ojuagu were located in a public transport vehicle destined to leave Ife.

Idahosa was a known member of the Black Axe. He had previously been expelled from the University of Benin and was later admitted for a diploma programme in Local Government Studies in Ife. Ojuagu was found to be in possession of clothing which was claimed to be the Black Axe uniform, two pairs of black berets and black T-shirts. The three apprehended students were beaten and tortured in the Awolowo Hall. Idahosa and Ojuagu are said to have confessed to participating in the attacks during, while Idahosa is said to have stated that the attack was organised to avenge the humiliating treatment of the Black Axe members who had been arrested on 7 March. During the course of the interrogation, Aikhile died, and his body was taken to the hospital mortuary. The interrogations also revealed that 22 Black Axe members were involved: six from the university, four from the University of Lagos, four from the University of Ibadan, and eight from the University of Calabar. There was also a separate claim that more students from the University of Benin were also involved.

Vice-Chancellor Wale Omole had been out of the country on the day of the attack. Upon returning to campus, he was summoned to Abuja to report the incident. On 14 July, his suspension was announced by the government. On 18 July, professor Roger Makanjuola was appointed Vice-Chancellor, replacing Omole. Makanjuola promised the students of Obafemi Awolowo University he would do everything in his power to bring the perpetrators to justice. Firstly he visited the Commissioner of Police, Mr. J.C. Nwoye, in Osogbo, who raised the issue that the university still had yet to officially report the murders despite what he said had been repeated requests. Makanjuola then wrote reports and submitted the required paperwork officially reporting the murders.

=== Arrests and prosecutions ===
In the following three weeks, 12 individuals were arrested and charge, including Idahosa and Ojuagu. Of the eight individuals involved in the 7 March incident, only one could be located and arrested. Two had left Nigeria to continue their studies in France.

On 18 October, a Judicial Commission of Inquiry was instated, and began activity on 24 November. The chairman of the commission was Justice Okoi Itam. Other members included professor Jadesola Akande, journalist Ray Ekpu, legal counsel Turi Akerele, and student representative and alumni Adeyinka Olumide-Fusika. The commission's report was submitted in February 2000 and was released, along with the Nigerian government's white paper, later that year. The commission expressed its strong belief that seven named individuals had participated in the killings—Frank Idahosa, Didi Yuletide, Kazeem "Kato" Bello, and four individuals who were identified only by their nicknames or Christian names—Innocent, Athanasius, "Ochuko", and "Chunk". The last was identified as the then head of the Black Axe. The commission also recommended the investigation of 16 other individuals, including Ojuagu and the nine involved in the 7 March incident. The commission criticized the police investigation of the case and recommended that the Inspector-General of Police set up a special task force for the investigation.

Trials commenced on 9 April 2001 in the Osogbo High Court.

In 2009 it was reported: "Ten years after the carnage, the relatives and associates of the victims as well as students of OAU are still crying out for justice."

== Depiction in media ==
There have been many depictions of the OAU massacre in various media. Dugbe Dugbe (2005) produced by Bukky Wright was based on the events of the massacre.

== See also ==
- Confraternities in Nigeria
- Organized crime in Nigeria
