= List of confraternities in Nigeria =

Confraternities in Nigeria are secretive student groups within Nigerian higher education.

== Men's confraternities ==
Confraternity	Nickname	Date founded	Institution	Location	Status	References
Aborigine Ogboni Fraternity				Imesi-Ile, Osun State, Nigeria	Active	
Big Five		Early 1990s	Rivers State University	Port Harcourt, Nigeria		
Black Axe		July 7, 1977	University of Benin	Benin City, Nigeria	Active	(Note: Black Axe originally operated as a subsection of the Neo Black Movement of Africa. However, NBM has publicly disassociated from Black Axe.)
Black Cobra of Ife				Ife, Nigeria	Active	
Black Scorpion		Early 1990s		Nigeria		
Blood Spot				Nigeria	Active	
Brotherhood of the Blood	Two-Two, Black Beret	Early 1990s	Enugu State University of Science and Technology	Enugu, Nigeria		
Buccaneers Confraternity (aka National Association of Sea Lords)	Fine Boys, Ban Boys, Alora, Bucketmen, Lords	1972	University of Ibadan	Ibadan, Nigeria	Active	(Note: Formed by members who were expelled from the Pyrate Confraternity.)
Deby Na debt (Eternal Fraternity Order of Legion Consortium)	Deebam, Klansmen	Early 1990s		Nigeria		(Note: Formed as Deebam, a street arm of KK.)
Deewell		Early 1990s		Nigeria		(Note: Street arm of SVC.)
Dreaded Friend of Friends		Early 1990s		Nigeria		
Eagle Club		Early 1990s		Nigeria		
Eternal Fraternal Order of the Legion Consortium (aka Klan Konfraternity)	KK	1983	University of Calabar	Calabar, Nigeria		
Executioners		Early 1990s		Nigeria		
Fame		Early 1990s		Nigeria		
Fraternity of Friends		Early 1990s		Nigeria	Active	
Green Circuit Association International	Maphite	1978	University of Benin	Benin City, Nigeria	Active	
Gentlemen Clubs		Early 1990s		Nigeria		
Jurists		Early 1990s		Nigeria		
Icelanders	German			Nigeria		
Mbacho		Early 1990s	Rivers State University	Port Harcourt, Nigeria		
Mgba Mgba Brothers		Early 1990s		Nigeria	Active	
National Association of Seadogs	Pyrates	1952	University College, Ibadan	Kubwa, Abuja,	Active	
Night Cadet		Early 1990s		Nigeria		
Neo Black Movement of Africa	NBM of Africa	July 7, 1977	University of Benin	Benin City, Nigeria	Active	
Ogboni		Before 1895		Nigeria	Active	
The Outlaws		Early 1990s		Nigeria		(Note: Formed as an offshoot of Icelanders (German).)
Red Sea Horse		Early 1990s		Nigeria	Active	
Sea Cults		Late 1960s		Nigeria		(Note: Formed by members of the Pyrate Confraternity.)
Second Son of Satan	SSS	Early 1990s		Nigeria		
Sonmen		Early 1990s		Nigeria		
Snow Men				Nigeria	Active	
Supreme Eiye Confraternity (aka National Association of Airlords)	SEC, NAA, Air Lords, Fliers, Airforce	1963	University of Ibadan	Ibadan, Nigeria	Active	(Note: This was originally formed at EIYE Group. The word "eiye" means "bird" in the Yorba language.)
Supreme Vikings Confraternity (aka De Norsemen Kclub of Nigeria)	SVC, Adventurers, Aro-mates, Vultures	1984	University of Port Harcourt	Port Harcourt, Nigeria	Active	(Note: Formed by former members of the Buccaneers. It was originally called the De Norsemen Club of Nigeria. It moved to the University of Port Harcourt in 1985.)
Temple of Eden		Early 1990s		Nigeria		
Trojan Horse		Early 1990s		Nigeria		
Victor Charlie Boys		Early 1990s	Rivers State University of Science and Technology	Port Harcourt, Nigeria		
White Bishops		Early 1990s		Nigeria		

== Women's confraternities ==
Confraternity	Nickname	Date founded	Institution	Location	Status	References
Black Brazier (aka Neo Black Queens of Africa)	Bra Bra, Axe Queens, AYE	Early 1990s		Nigeria	Active	
Damsel		Early 1990s		Nigeria		
Daughters of Jezebel		Early 1990s		Nigeria		
Jezebel	Amazons			Nigeria		
Knights of the Aristos				Nigeria		
Lady of Rose				Nigeria		
Marine Girls				Nigeria		
Pink Lady				Nigeria		
Royal Queens				Nigeria		
Sisterhood of Darkness				Nigeria		
Supreme Blue Angles	Eiye Confraternity			Nigeria	Active	
Viqueens		Early 1990s		Nigeria		
White Angel				Nigeria		
Woman Brassier	Brave			Nigeria		

== Coed confraternities ==
Confraternity	Nickname	Date founded	Institution	Location	Status	References
Kegite Club			Obafemi Awolowo University	Ile-Ife, Nigeria	Active	(Note: Was originally called Palm Wine Drinkers Association.)
Reformed Ogboni Fraternity	ROF	1914		Lagos, Nigeria	Active	
