= Operation Jackal III =

2024 Interpol operation targeting West African organized crime

Operation Jackal III was a global law enforcement operation targeting West African organized crime groups. The operation was coordinated by Interpol and ran from April 10 to July 3, 2024, across 21 countries on five continents. Law enforcement agencies in Argentina, Australia, Brazil, Canada, Cote D’Ivoire, France, Germany, Indonesia, Ireland, Italy, Japan, Malaysia, Netherlands, Nigeria, Portugal, South Africa, Spain, Sweden, Switzerland, the United Kingdom, and the United States were involved in the operation. The operation targeted online financial fraud and the West African syndicates behind it, including the Black Axe group.

== Operation ==
Operation Jackal III sought to disrupt advanced cybercrime activities and the global operations of West African organized crime groups. Interpol officials saw the operation as a significant blow to the Black Axe network and online financial fraud operations. The operation built upon intelligence gathered from previous "Jackal" raids, allowing Interpol to develop a comprehensive intelligence database that is shared among its 196 member countries.

The operation alleged that Black Axe used money mules to open bank accounts worldwide and launder funds from victims of online financial fraud. Data seized during the operation revealed large transfers to Nigerian bank accounts, cryptocurrency transactions, and sophisticated money laundering operations. In one operation in Ireland, more than €1 million in crypto-assets were seized. During Operation Jackal III in Argentina, authorities dismantled a transnational criminal network following a five-year investigation and the Argentine Federal Police seized $1.2 million in counterfeit supernotes, arrested 72 suspects, and froze around 100 bank accounts. Canadian authorities said they busted a money-laundering scheme linked to Black Axe worth more than $5 billion (£3.8bn) in 2017.

Outcomes of Operation Jackal III:

- Arrests: Approximately 300 individuals suspected of being members of the Black Axe and other affiliated groups were arrested.
- Suspects Identified: Over 400 additional suspects were identified.
- Assets Seized: $3 million in assets were seized.
- Bank Accounts Frozen: More than 720 bank accounts were frozen.

== Origins in Ireland ==
While Black Axe is a West African organized crime group, Interpol's "Jackal" operations originated in Ireland. Following a series of raids by the Garda National Economic Crime Bureau (GNECB) in 2020, a handful of Black Axe members were arrested, leading to the exposure of a much wider network. These raids revealed the scale of money laundering through Ireland and the increasing sophistication of cybercrime.
