= Reformed Ogboni Fraternity =

Nigerian Christian mystical fraternal organization

- ROF
- Founded: December 18, 1914; 111 years ago Lagos, Nigeria
- Type: Nigerian Confraternity
- Affiliation: Independent
- Status: Active
- Emphasis: yoruba tradition
- Scope: International
- Motto: "Behold, How Good and Pleasant it is for Brethren to Dwell together in Unity."
- Chapters: 952
- Nickname: R.O.F.
- Headquarters: 38, Abeokuta Street, Adekunle, Lagos; Nigeria

The Reformed Ogboni Fraternity, also known as the R.O.F, is an international fraternal organization. It is commonly described by initiates as a syncretic blend of the Ogboni system of Yorubaland and various external elements.

== History ==
The Reformed Ogboni Fraternity was founded on 18 December 1914. It was started as an alternative of the Ogboni Fraternity for practitioners of Christianity, and its founder was the Anglican cleric T.A.J. Ogunbiyi.

Founding members that joined him in starting the fraternity included Prince Orisadipe Obasa, his wife Princess Charlotte Blaize Obasa of the R.B. Blaize family, and Prince M. Akinsemoyin of the Akinsemoyin royal family. Prince Obasa was recognized by the founders as the first Oluwo, or master, in the same year.

Although the fraternity was started both by and for the Christian elite, it has since grown in scope, and today its membership includes aristocratic followers of different faiths. External elements that influenced the fraternity's founders during its creation included everything from the early Christianity of Nigeria (as manifested in the local chapter of the Keswick Convention) to English Freemasonry.

== Symbols ==
The motto of the fraternity is "Behold, How Good and Pleasant it is for Brethren to Dwell together in Unity." Its nickname is R.O.F.

== Membership ==
Membership is open to males between the ages of 21 or older and females who are 40 or older who agree to embrace a "non-idolatrous faith in God".

== Chapters ==
As of May 2010, the Reformed Ogboni Fraternity had had 940 lledi or conclaves in Nigeria, one in Cameroon, five in London, five in Italy, and one in Belgium.

== Notable members ==
Notable members of the fraternity have included:

- Orisadipe Obasa, medical doctor and leading political figure, first Oluwo (or master) of the fraternity
- Charlotte Obasa, pioneering businesswoman, first Iya Abiye (or lady master) of the fraternity
- Adetokunbo Ademola, Olori Oluwo of the fraternity, Chief Justice of Nigeria
- Ladapo Ademola, the Alake of Egbaland
- Adeyemo Alakija, Olori Oluwo (or grandmaster) of the fraternity, a member of the Nigerian Legislative Council, president of Egbe Omo Oduduwa
- Ladoke Akintola, Premier of Western Nigeria
- Nnamdi Azikiwe, president of Nigeria
- Ahmadu Bello, Premier of Northern Nigeria
- Gaius Obaseki, Iyase of Benin City and Oluwo of the Benin conclave
- George VI, King of the United Kingdom and the Dominions
- Francis Meshioye, esotericist and Olori Oluwo
- Olubuse II, the fiftieth traditional ruler or Ooni of Ife
- Olusegun Obasanjo, president of Nigeria

== Controversies ==
The organization has been alleged to be a secret cult partaking in human sacrifices, although no cogent evidence has ever substantiated this. In an exposé on occultism titled Occult Grandmaster Now in Christ, a Nigerian bestseller written in 1993 by Iyke Nathan Uzorma, the organization was alleged to be engaging in "Rajo witchcraft" which had little to no credence as the author didn’t explain, nor elaborate on what Rajo witchcraft meant . On December 19, 2019, Francis Meshioye the Olori Oluwo (which in English means the supreme leader of the organization) negated any alleged claim of wrongdoing on the part of the organization and expressly stated that there was nothing sinister about it.

== See also ==
- List of confraternities in Nigeria
