= Death of Marcus Omofuma =

Marcus Omofuma (10 May 1973 – 1 May 1999) was a Nigerian asylum seeker in Austria who died due to police brutality while being deported. His death became a symbol for anti-racist movements in Austria.

== Life ==
Omofuma was part of the Yoruba fraternity Ogboni and was escaping Nigeria from death threats within the fraternity. In 1994, he arrived in Germany and failed to gain asylum. In November 1998, he fled to Austria and again sought for asylum due to his persecution by the Ogboni fraternity. The Austrian authorities declined his asylum in two instances and detained him from December 1998 on.

On 1 May 1999, 25-year-old Omofuma was being deported from Austria. Three police officers put him in a plane operated by Balkan Airlines to Sofia. Because he was resisting, they fettered and gagged him and fixed him on his plane seat. The tape that was used to fetter him was not checked during the whole flight and it made it impossible for him to breathe. He died painfully during the ca. 1 hour flight. His death was realized when landing in Sofia.

He had one daughter.

== Aftermath ==
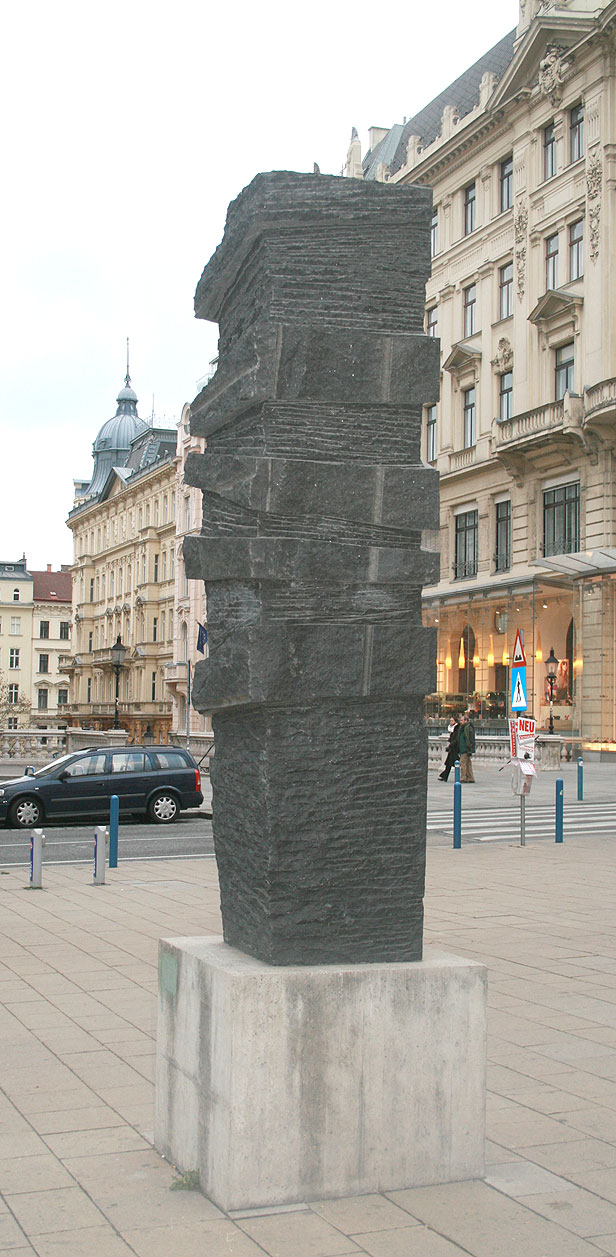
Marcus Omofuma memorial stone in Vienna

Omofuma's death caused a wave of protests among the African community in Austria and gained wide media attention in Austria. The biggest protest happened on 8 May 1999 in Vienna. The tabloid newspaper Kronen Zeitung was criticized for its racist coverage of the case, justifying the police officers' actions and victim blaming Omofuma for being involved in criminal activities. Many of the protesters were arrested in a police operation against drug trafficking that the Ministry of Interior started on 27 May 1999, called "Operation Spring".

The three police officers who were responsible for his death were suspended from their duty, but in February 2001 the suspension was removed. In 2002, they were convicted to 8 months of prison due to "negligent homicide under especially dangerous circumstances". The defenders of the police officers argued that Omofuma himself had carried responsibility for his death, because he had resisted his deportation. All three could continue their duties as police officers. In 2009, two of them were still working as police officers, while one was retired. The punishment was criticized by activists and human rights organisations as too low.

In response to the case, in July 1999 a human rights advisory board to the Volksanwaltschaft was founded. The board is supposed to give recommendations to the Austrian Ministry of Interior.

Omofuma's death and the mild punishment of the police officers became a symbol for anti-racist movements and activists in Austria. Even for the 10th anniversary of his death, protests were organised in Vienna.

In front of Museumsquartier in the city center of Vienna, there is a memorial dedicated to him. The memorial stone was made by artist Ulrike Truger in 2003. The stone was first put up on 10 October 2003 next to Vienna State Opera without permission by the authorities and on 15 December 2003 it was moved to its current location. Right-wing politician Jörg Haider called Omofuma a "drug dealer", when the memorial stone was erected. Omofuma's daughter filed a lawsuit against Haider for defamation and won.
