= Black Axe (confraternity) =

Nigerian political and religious organization

- Founded: July 7, 1977; 49 years ago University of Benin (Nigeria)
- Type: Nigerian Confraternity
- Affiliation: Independent
- Former affiliation: Neo Black Movement of Africa
- Status: Active
- Emphasis: Pan-Africanism
- Scope: International
- Colors: White, Black, and Yellow
- Symbol: Black Axe and chains
- Members: 1,000+ lifetime
- Nickname: Axemen
- Criminal Activities: Cybercrime, election fraud, human trafficking, drug trafficking, money laundering, and murder
- Rivals: Supreme Eiye Confraternity, De Norsemen Kclub of Nigeria, and Buccaneers Confraternity

The Black Axe is a Nigerian transnational crime organisation and confraternity. Originally formed from and inspired by the Neo Black Movement of Africa (NBM), it was established at the University of Benin (Benin City, Edo State) as part of the Pan-African movement in 1977.

The BBC has labelled Black Axe a "mafia-style gang" who are known to engage in activities such as cybercrime, election fraud, human trafficking, drug trafficking, intimidation, and violence. On 10 July 1999, forty Black Axe members were involved in the Obafemi Awolowo University massacre, in Ifẹ, Osun State, in which five students were killed and eleven were injured. In 2024, the Neo Black Movement of Africa publicly distanced itself from the Black Axe.

== History ==
On July 7, 1977, nine students from the University of Benin, led by Nicholas Idemudia, started the Neo Black Movement of Africa (NBM), a male brotherhood focused on "intellectual radicalism in pursuit of Pan-African struggles." Adopting a logo of a black axe "smashing the shackles of colonialism," the NBM was a response to the perceived excesses of the Pyrates, another confraternity group. This logo gave the group its common name, the Black Axe.

The NBM became a prominent group at many universities in Nigeria during the 1980s. Its leaders then decided to connect with the Neo Black Movement of Africa, calling themselves a brotherhood that focused on Black realism and determinism. The iteration led to the creation of a subgroup, the Black Axe, around 1994.

Black Axe blended the historical religion of Nigeria with anti-colonial activism, leading some to call it a cult. It adopted violence to make its members "strong men". It claimed to fight against oppression, saying that its members would only kill for justice and would not kill the innocent. As the Black Axe expanded and its violence increased, the 1994 graduating members decided to separate the confraternity from the University of Benin.

In 2008, Black Axe's membership was estimated at over 1,000 "educated males." In 2024, NBM of Africa publicly dissociated itself from the Black Axe confraternity and expelled nearly fifty connected members, including four former NBM national presidents. However, various publications refer to NBM and Black Axe as synonymous, including the Immigration and Refugee Board of Canada. In April 2024, reporter Biaca Bridger wrote, "Due to the secretive nature of the group it is difficult to ascertain the alleged links between the Neo Black Movement and Black Axe. However, throughout Nigeria, the two groups are synonymous, with their members taking part in organized crime, human trafficking and money laundering."

== Symbols ==
Black Axe's symbol comes from NBM and is a black axe above two hands in chains or the shackles of colonialism. Like NBM, its colors are white, black, and yellow. Members wear white shirts, black pants, a yellow tie, and headgear consisting of a yellow ribbon. White represents harmony and purity of the body and mind, black represents sympathy with the Black race, and yellow represents the intelligence of its members. Its members are called Axemen.

== Customs and rituals ==
Before recruitment and initiation, potential members must sign an "oath of secrecy," pledging never to reveal any information to non-members or to violate the group's rules. The initiation ceremony itself is sometimes called Blending. The gatherings of new members are called Jollifications.

There are several rituals that recruits must go through before they are admitted. It is claimed that "the Axemen are stripped naked and forced to lie in mud while enduring severe physical abuse, crawl through their tormentors' legs in a process known as "devil's passage", and drink blood." This is used to degrade them and connect them. It has also been said that some of the ceremonies include bonfires, drugs, and the sexual assault of women.

Leaders use death threats and other types of violence against members who have any ideas of leaving the confraternity. Some members, usually first-year students, are forcefully initiated. The Black Axe does this by "portraying the university environment as hostile and students as in need of protection." After they are initiated, they are given a black robe with their logo and told that they "have just acquired (their) coffin."

The confraternity also has a ceremony called a gyration where they worship Korofo, whom they also call "the unseen God" or "the devil to guide all men".

== Governance ==
There is little information about the structure and hierarchy of the group. The group has a hierarchical structure that keeps everything running, comprising:

- Priest
- Chairman – an elected officer
- Eyes – responsible for keeping an eye out for police at different events and initiation
- Criers – responsible for publicity, including fliers and emails
- Butchers – responsible for enforcing the rules, punishing members, and fighting rival confraternities

== Criminal activities ==
The BBC has called the Black Axe a "mafia-style gang".

=== Election fraud ===
The Black Axe seems to have engaged in political misconduct. For example, Augustus Bemigho, a 2019 APC party candidate for political office, was connected to the Black Axe. Emails show that he "sent guidance on scamming to a network of collaborators on 62 occasions and communicated with others about specific scamming targets." Some of the documents in his emails show that in Benin City, 35 million naira ($85,000; £64,000) was directed to the Black Axe to secure votes in 2012.

=== Cybercrime and financial crime ===
In October 2021, eight members of the Black Axe were arrested and charged in connection with Internet scams. In 2011 and 2012, members of the group in South Africa were accused of running romance scams and advance-fee schemes to defraud investors. They used the widely known Nigerian email scams, as well as social media, dating websites, and phone numbers to target US citizens.

In 2021 and 2022, Interpol arrested 75 suspected members of the Black Axe for trying to wire one million dollars through many bank accounts. This operation spanned four countries on four continents. Along with cars and luxury items, Interpol agents seized 12,000 SIM cards that helped identify many suspects.

In 2023, a member of the Black Axe was caught stealing one million dollars through money laundering. Starting in 2017, a man who was supposedly working with the Black Axe opened many bank accounts to conceal money that was secured from fraudulent schemes such as business email compromises. One of the names he operated under was the Abravoo Trading Company.

=== Murder ===
Much of Black Axe's violent crime, including murders and rapes, is not reported, as there is little policing within Benin City. There are many instances of violence between the Black Axe and other confraternities. At least 53 people were injured or killed between March 2009 and June 2013 in fights between the Black Axe and their rivals, the Eiye confraternity.

On 10 July 1999, forty members of the Black Axe drove to Obafemi Awolowo University in Ile-Ife. Holding shotguns and hatchets, they called out to specific students, saying things like "Faro, come out if you are a man! Legacy, come out if na your father born you!" Black Axe members entered the students' residence, killing five and injuring eleven people.

In May 2009, there was a fight between the Black Axe and the De Norsemen Kclub of Nigeria. This led to injuries and deaths amongst students at the University of Abuja. In March 2010, another fight broke out against the Maphite confraternity, resulting in the deaths of nine people.

=== Human trafficking and prostitution ===
In 2016, almost two dozen Black Axe members were arrested in Italy for "mafia conspiracy, drug trafficking, exploitation of prostitution and violent crimes." A year later, more Black Axe members were suspected in other sex trafficking activities in Italy.

In January 2022, four Black Axe members were arrested after forcing a woman into human trafficking. She was forced into prostitution after a ritual that bonded her to her traffickers' debts. It was reported that she had been "imprisoned, raped, blackmailed, and forced into prostitution to pay a debt of about €15,000."

== See also ==
- Confraternities in Nigeria
- List of confraternities in Nigeria
