= Supreme Eiye Confraternity =

Nigerian confraternity

- SEC
- Coat of Arms of Supreme Eye Confraternity
- Founded: 1965; 61 years ago University of Ibadan
- Type: Nigerian Confraternity
- Affiliation: Independent
- Status: Active
- Scope: International
- Colors: Blue and White
- Symbol: Eagle
- Nickname: Fliers, Airforce, and Airlords
- Other names: National Association of Airlords
- Criminal activities: Drug trafficking, passport forgery, money laundering, and sex trafficking
- Rivals: Black Axe (confraternity)
- Headquarters: Ibadan, Oyo State; Nigeria

The Supreme Eiye Confraternity (SEC), also known as the National Association of Airlords (NAA), is a confraternity in Nigeria. It was established in 1965 as a university student group. It is connected to a variety of criminal activities within Nigeria and internationally.

== History ==
The Supreme Eiye Confraternity was established at the University of Ibadan in Nigeria in 1965 as the Eiye Group. Its founders were students Goke Adeniji, Bayo Adenubi, Tunde Aluko, Bode Fadase, Dele Nwakpele, Kayode Oke, and Bode Sowunmi. Its purpose is "to uphold the core nature of the African culture with a commitment to excellence" and "to make [a] positive impact on the socio-political psyche of Nigeria and ensure complete break away from [the] colonial/imperial cultural domination of the time". In 1969, it became the Supreme Eiye Confraternity (SEC).

The group registered with the government as the National Association of Airlords (NAA). It has added chapters or forums throughout Nigeria and countries in North Africa, West Africa, the Middle East, and Western Europe. The majority of its members are teenagers, college students, and recent college graduates.

In 2004, Nigeria passed the Secret Cult and Similar Activities Prohibition Act, which outlawed the SEC along with other alleged cult groups.

== Customs and symbols ==
The name Eiye is Yoruba for bird, coming from the expression eiye o ni sa sun, on buta or "a bird has no pot, yet feeds itself". Its symbol is an eagle. Members have a bird tattoo on the back of their left arm. Members are referred to as Fliers, Airforce, and Airlords.

The confraternity's colors are blue and white. Members wear fez caps, inscribed with the date 6:15. The group celebrates its anniversary on June 15.

== Governance ==
Details about the SEC's structure and activities are difficult to confirm because of the secretive nature of the group. According to a UNODC report, as of 2014, the SEC is organized into local cells called "forums". Each forum operates independently, with rigid hierarchies and specific functional roles. Members are often connected by familiar or other relational ties. Cities with an SEC cell are called nests, with its "mother nest" being in Ibadan.

Similar to many other Nigerian confraternities, the regional leaders of the SEC are termed Capones, a reference to American gangster Al Capone.

== Criminal activities ==
Although formed as a student group, the BBC and the United Nations Office on Drugs and Crime report that it has become a criminal organization, with many members committing violence and crimes in Nigeria and abroad, including drug trafficking, passport forgery, money laundering, and sex trafficking. The criminal activities of local Eiye Confraternity cells vary according to capability.

The Guardian has called the SEC a "secret cult". The Police Campaign Against Cultism and Other Vices of the Nigeria Police Force calls it a "dangerous and unlawful group".

The SEC has been connected to violence in various cities across southwestern Nigeria, including clashes in and around Lagos, as well as Oredo in Edo State, Kwale in Delta State, Owo in Ondo State, and Ogijo and Abeokuta in Ogun State.

Its initiation ceremonies include beatings and hazing, often requiring recruits to commit crimes such as armed robbery, "obligatory rapes" of women associated with other confraternities, or physical attacks on university faculty members. Some former members claim they were kidnapped and forced to join during the group's celebrations. In August 2025, an individual reportedly died during one such initiation, resulting in one arrest.

The confraternity has a long-standing rivalry with Black Axe, another Nigerian confraternity-affiliated group. This has included killings of rival members. According to The Guardian Nigeria, between January and June 2024, 24 people were killed in cult-related violence in Ogun State alone, most of these attributed to the SEC–Black Axe conflict.

=== International activities ===
In 2014, Italian police concluded an investigation into the SEC. They found that the group, along with the Black Axe, had been active in Italy since at least 2008, and had established an organized criminal network with connections in other European countries which was directly involved in trafficking of women from rural Nigeria into Europe. It is also reported to have operated a sex trafficking operation in Barcelona, Spain until a police raid in 2016, which resulted in 23 arrests. In addition to human trafficking, SEC operatives are also reported to be involved in transporting stolen crude oil into Europe.

In 2021, two Eiye members were arrested in Pretoria, South Africa in September 2021, in connection to online scams. The operation was assisted by Interpol.

== See also ==
- Confraternities in Nigeria
- List of confraternities in Nigeria
- Black Axe (confraternity)
