= Ògbóni =

Nigerian confraternity

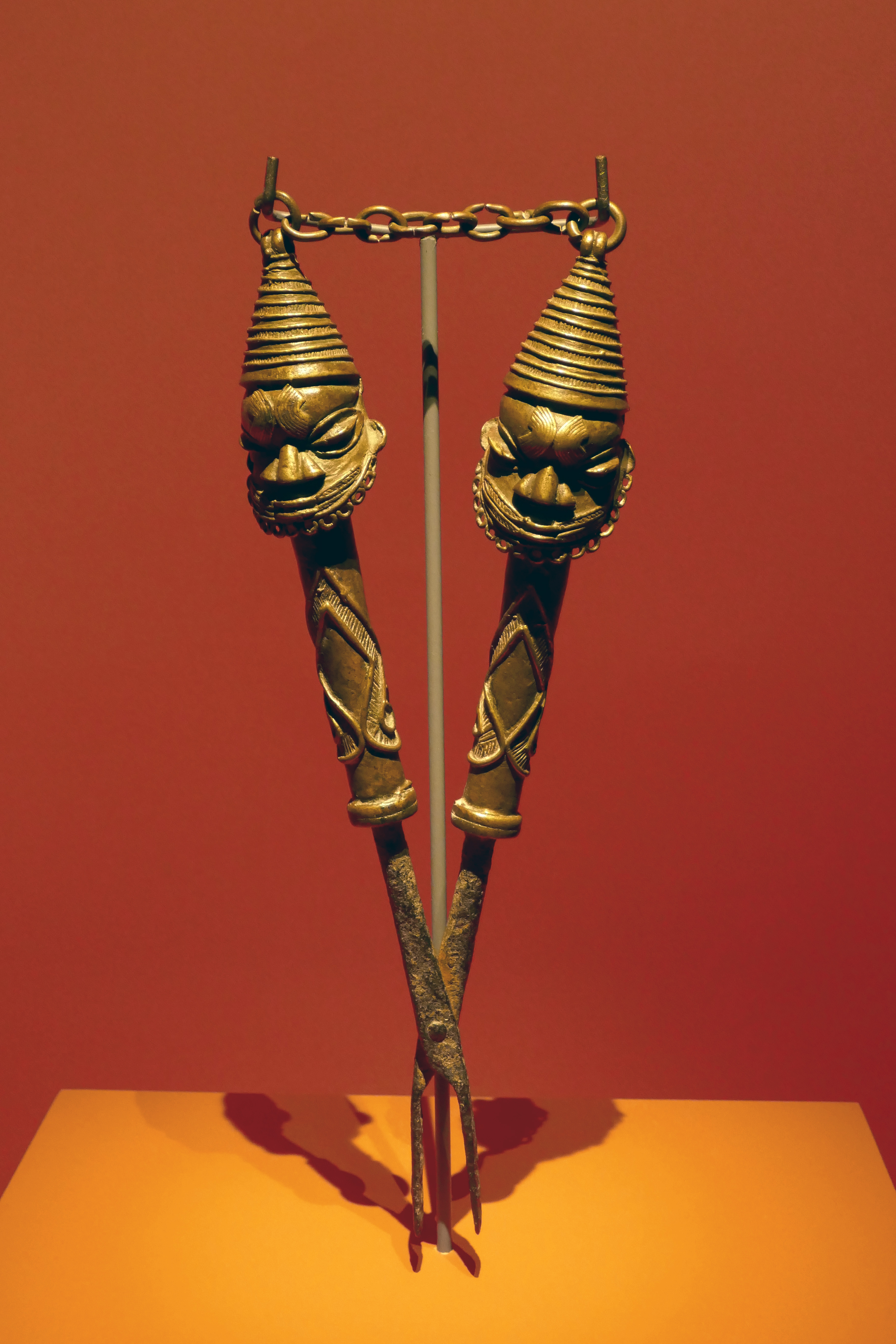
- Edan Ògbóni.
- Founded: Before 1884
- Type: Fraternal order
- Affiliation: Independent
- Status: Active
- Emphasis: Yorubas
- Scope: International: Nigeria; Benin; Brazil; Cuba
- Headquarters: Nigeria

Ògbóni (also known as Òṣùgbó in Ijèbú) is a fraternal institution indigenous to the Yoruba-speaking polities of Nigeria, Republic of Bénin and Togo. The society performs a range of political and religious functions, including exercising a profound influence on monarchs and serving as high courts of jurisprudence in capital offenses.

Its members are generally considered to constitute the nobility of the various Yoruba kingdoms of West Africa.

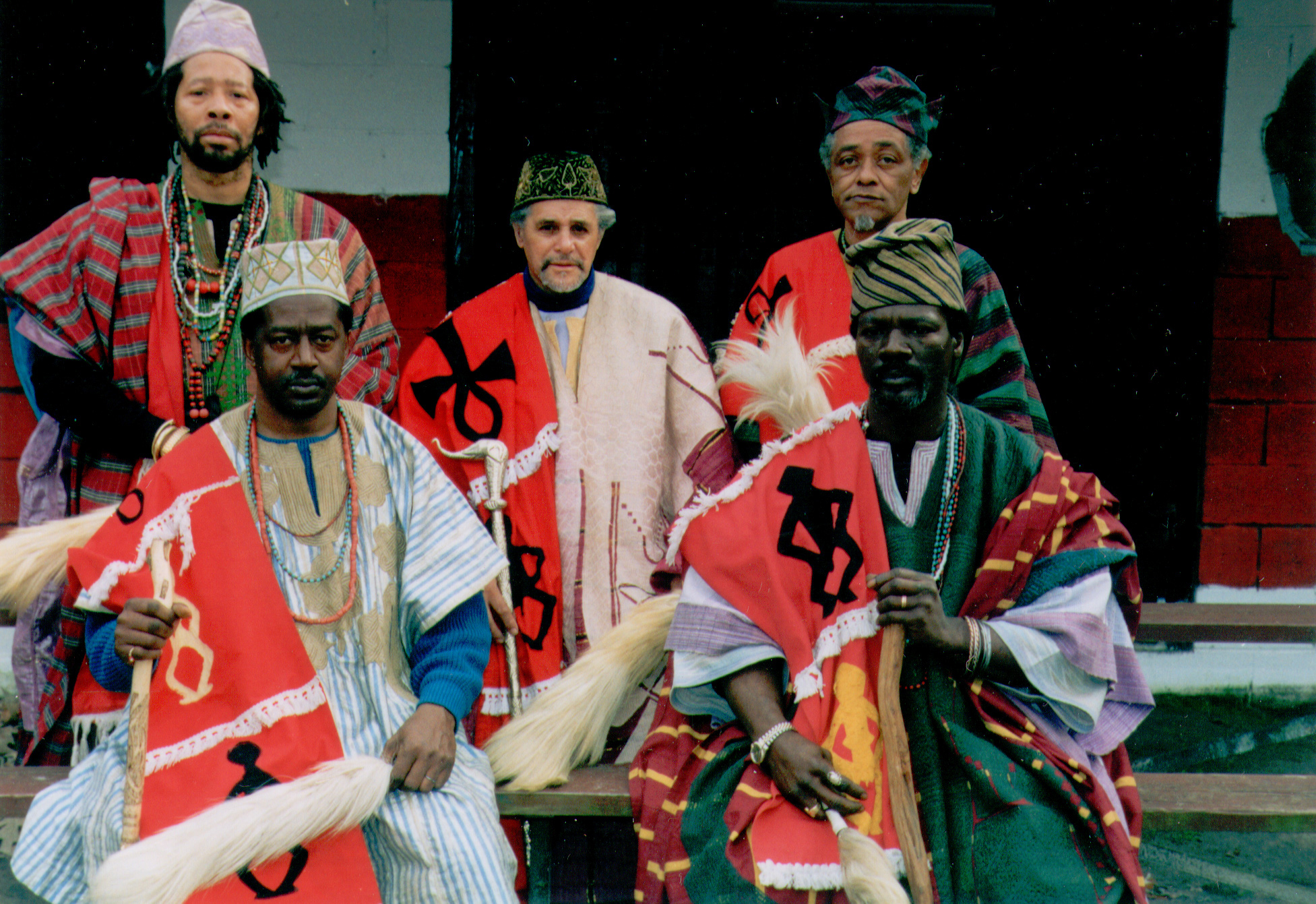
Ogboni Society of Oyotunji African Village.

== The Iwarẹfa ==
Each Ogboni lodge is led by a group of six principal officers that are collectively known as the Ìwàrẹ̀fà, a contraction of Ìwàrẹ + ẹ̀fà (lit. The six wise elders). These individuals are the most powerful figures in the polity that the lodge serves and are the inner council of advisors to its king or viceroy chieftain.

== Influence ==
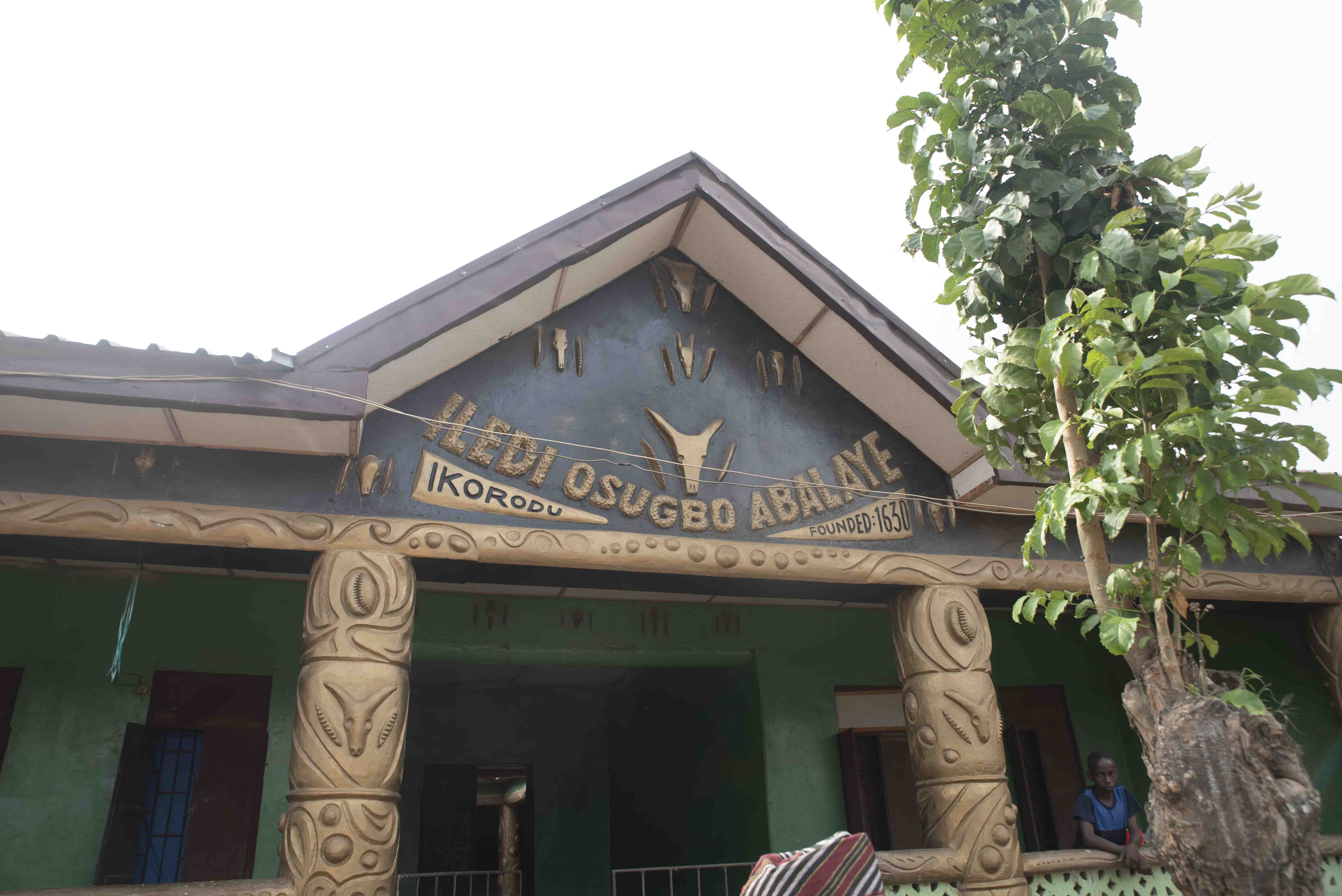
An Osugbo Iledi (meeting house/congregation building) in Ikorodu, Lagos state.

Though versions of this fraternal group are found among the various types of Yoruba states – from highly centralized kingdoms and empires like Oyo (where they were expected to check the authority of the Oyo Mesi), to the independent towns and villages of the Ègbá and the Èkiti – the Ogboni are recognizable for their veneration of the personified earth (Ilè or Oduduwa) and their emphasis on both gerontocratic authority and benevolent service to the community. While membership in the Ogboni generally signified a high level of power and prestige, the society held pre-eminent political authority among decentralized groups like the Ègbá, where they were intimately involved in the selection of rulers that served as little other than figureheads in practice. In contemporary Yorubaland, Ogboni members still command great power and influence in the affairs of their societies, although this is largely due to the history of their respective chieftaincies and not to any official authority.

Ogboni lodges were one of the main commissioners of brass jewelry and sculpture in pre-colonial Yorubaland, using the metal's rust-resistant qualities as an apt metaphor for the immortal functions and beliefs of Ogboni adepts. The most recognizable of these symbols was a pair of Ogboni initiates, one male and one female, attached by a chain and worn around the neck. Known as the Edan Ogboni, the pair are thought to symbolize the attachment of the sexes in procreation and balanced society. Generally, one or both figures will hold a thumb in the grip of the opposite hand, demonstrating the paramount Ogboni handsign denoting initiation and membership.

== Legacy ==
A number of post-colonial fraternities in Nigeria have incorporated references and insignia from the original Ogboni, such as the Reformed Ogboni Fraternity and the Aborigine Ogboni Fraternity.

== See also ==
- Secret society
- List of confraternities in Nigeria
- Confraternities in Nigeria
- Reformed Ogboni Fraternity
