= Francis Meshioye =

Nigerian esotericist and supreme leader of the Reformed Ogboni Fraternity

Chief Francis Meshioye is a Nigerian esotericist. He currently serves as the Olori Oluwo of the Reformed Ogboni Fraternity, a Nigerian fraternal order.
