= Kegite Club =

Socio-cultural group in Nigeria

- Founded: October 1962; 64 years ago Obafemi Awolowo University
- Type: Student society
- Affiliation: Independent
- Status: Active
- Scope: International
- Motto: "Unity in diversity"
- Colors: Green, White, and Brown
- Symbol: Keg (drinking gourd)
- Tree: Palm Tree
- Chapters: 100+
- Former name: Palm Wine Drinkers Association Kegites Confraternity Kegites Club
- Headquarters: Ifẹ, Osun State; Nigeria
- Website: supremostkegitesclubinternational.org

The Kegite Club International is an coed social and cultural student society. It was founded in 1962 at Obafemi Awolowo University, Ile-ife, Osun State, Nigeria. It has established more than 100 chapters, mostly in Nigeria, but also in India, the United Kingdom, and the United States. The group has some similarities to confraternities in Nigeria, but most Nigerians consider it to be an open social-cultural organization.

== History ==
The Palm Wine Drinkers Association was formed by seven students in October 1962 as a social-cultural group at the University of Ile-Ife (now Obafemi Awolowo University) in Ife, Osun State, Nigeria. The club used palm juices (palm wine) to access and promote African culture. The club's first chief was Olusegun Adesina, later a professor at the university. Its first female member joined in 1968. However, the club went inactive temporarily in the late 1960s.

In 1972, similar group, the Kegites Confraternity, formed at the University of Ibadan. Its purpose was "to use African songs, folklore and other elements of Africanity to encourage university undergraduates of that era everywhere to maintain their Africaness".

The two groups merged as the Kegites Club in 1973, commemorated with a celebration at Ife. The club expanded to Ibadan Polytechnic in 1973. In 1974, the club started spreading to other schools in Nigeria, eventually becoming established at all institutions of higher education in the country.

Its name was changed to the Kegite Club International in October 1986. Chapters were opened in Brazil, Ghana, India, Liberia, and the United Kingdom. The organisation promotes and assimilates the culture of Africa, encourages socio-cultural activities and the use of items of African origin, and holds interactions called "gyrations" in their shrine. By 1996, it had 91 chapters.

As of 2024, it has more than 100 chapters, including alumni branches in India, the United Kingdom, and Chicago, Illinois. Obafemi Awolowo University is its world headquarters. The University of Ibadan is its national (Nigerian) headquarters.

== Symbols and traditions ==
The name Kegites is a combination of "keg" (a gourd used for wine storage), the "white juices" that come from palm tree, and "palm tree". Its symbol is the palm tree which produces palm wine and is evergreen, symbolizes never dying. Its colors are green, white, and brown. Green is the color of the palm tree leaves and life. White is the color of the palm tree's juice and stands for peace. Brown comes from the color of the palm wine keg and stands for land and soil.

The Palm Wine Drinkers Association's motto was "Our culture is our heritage; help to uphold it". The Kegites Club's motto was "The basis of African unity and world peace in palm wine." Its motto became "Unity in diversity" with the name change to Kegite Club International 1986.

Members sing songs in Yorùbá about palm wine, based on Christian hymns. In some songs, the words "Jesus" and "My Lord" have been replaced with "palm wine". In others, the word "God" is replaced with the "tapper", the club's name for the person who provides the wine.

The club's shrine or meeting place is a small building with a wide space in front for gyrations. Shrines include handmade instruments and are fenced with bamboo, similar to traditional palm wine bars in rural Nigeria. Gyrations are gathering that consist of singing, dancing, and drinking. The palm wine consumed at gyrations is referred to as "holy water".

== Governance ==
The Kegite Club is led by a president, called the chief. Other officers include the elder who advises the chief, the feda or general secretary, the parrot or public relations officer, the marshal who oversees security and discipline, and the purse or treasurer. The name feda is based on the English word "feather", recalling when a feather and ink were used to write. Other officers include a songito or composer of songs, a commissioner of dancing, H.O.D. or Head of Drummer who leads the drummitos (drummers), a tapper who provides the wine, and the pourer who serves the wine. The club also has a curator who is responsible for its property.

== Controversies ==
Although the Kegite Club is mostly viewed as a social organization, some Nigerians consider it to be a confraternity or cult because of its role in a sociocultural movement. However, Kegite Club is inclusive of all ethnic groups and promotes an ideology with "no negative consequences", which distinguishes it from other known Nigerian confraternities.

== See also ==
- Confraternities in Nigeria
- List of confraternities in Nigeria
