= Neo Black Movement of Africa =

Nigerian confratenity

- NBM
- Founded: 7 July 1977; 49 years ago University of Benin (Nigeria)
- Type: Nigerian Confraternity
- Affiliation: Independent
- Status: Active
- Emphasis: Pan-Africanism
- Scope: International
- Motto: "Social Justice and Equality/Equity for all"
- Colors: White, Black, and Yellow
- Symbol: Black Axe and chains
- Members: 1,000,000 lifetime
- Nickname: NBM of Africa
- Headquarters: Amagba, Benin City, Edo State; Nigeria
- Website: nbmofafrica.org

The Neo Black Movement of Africa is an international confraternity. It was established in 1977 at the University of Benin in Nigeria as part of the Pan-African movement.

== History ==
In 1977, nine students from the University of Benin, led by Nicholas Idemudia started the Neo Black Movement of Africa (NBM), a male brotherhood focused on "intellectual radicalism in pursuit of Pan-African struggles." With the support of M. Angulu Onwuejiogwu, a professor of history and anthropology at the university, the founders of the NBM were:

- Marvel Akpoyibo
- Uche Alumona
- Tokunbo Brown
- Gbolahom Dosunmu
- Godwin Ehigiator
- Nicholas Idemudia
- Bernard Ojishua
- Olagungu Ojo
- John Okogie

The NBM formed as a response to the reported excesses of National Association of Seadogs (Pyrates), a similar group established in 1952. NBM became a prominent group at many universities in Nigeria during the 1980s. Its leaders then decided to connect with the Neo black movement of Africa, calling itself a brotherhood focusing on black realism and determinism.

The Neo-Black Movement of Africa was registered with the Corporate Affairs Commission under the Company and Allied Matters Act (CAMA) on 24 February 1994, with registration No 7729. As of 2024, it has around one million members. Its headquarters are in Amagba, Benin City, Edo State, Nigeria.

== Symbols ==
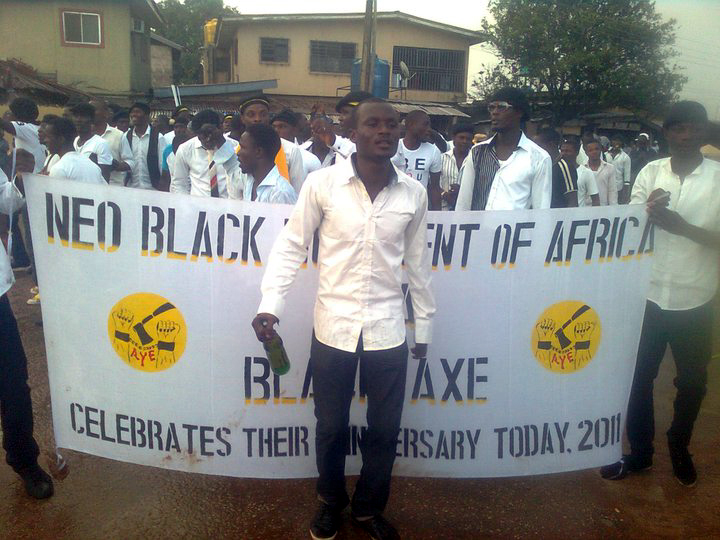
Members of the Neo Black Movement of Africa, 2011

The NBM's motto is "Social Justice and Equality/Equity for all." Its symbol is a black axe above two hands in chains, symbolically smashing the shackles of colonialism. This represents its readiness to confront difficult tasks and to break social injustice, along with other vices that limit humanity's progress.

Its colours are white, black, and yellow. Members wear white shirts, black pants, a yellow tie, and headgear consisting of a yellow ribbon. White represents harmony and purity of the body and mind, black represents sympathy with the Black race, and yellow represents struggle.

== Activities ==
NBM's activities encourage African art, culture, and traditions, along with global peace. It holds a national convention annually in March. Members participate in "jollification", an event featuring Egede drums, music, and dancing. At the end of each year, the group hosts Black/African Nights that are open to non-members of all genders. Members participate in at least one charitable activity each year. Its priorities include climate change, education, food sovereignty, health, indigenous people, and water.

== Controversies and member misconduct ==
In February 2024, the Neo Black Movement of Africa publicly disassociated itself from the Black Axe, a criminal subgroup of the confraternity that formed in 1994. In January 2024, NBM published a list of 24 expelled members who were associated with Black Axe, followed by a list of 27 expelled members in July 2024. The latter included four former NBM national presidents. However, various publications refer to NBM and Black Axe as synonymous, including the Immigration and Refugee Board of Canada. In April 2024, reporter Biaca Bridger wrote, "Due to the secretive nature of the group it is difficult to ascertain the alleged links between the Neo-Black Movement and Black Axe. However, throughout Nigeria, the two groups are synonymous, with their members taking part in organized crime, human trafficking and money laundering."

== Chapters ==
NBM refers to its campus chapters as temples. As of 2013, its temples were at the following Nigerian colleges and universities, with active chapters indicated in bold and inactive chapters and institutions in italics.

Chapter	Charter date	Institution	Location	Status	Ref.
**Futa Jallon**	7 July 1977	University of Benin, Ugbowo Campus	Benin City, Edo State	Active	
**Adamawa**		Institute of Management and Technology, Enugu	Enugu, Enugu State	Active	
Afotamodi		Gateway ICT Polytechnic	Ogun State	Active	
**Agemo**		Tai Solarin University of Education	Ijebu Ode, Ogun State	Active	
**Agulu Lake**		Alvan Ikoku Federal College of Education	Owerri, Imo State	Active	
**Ajayi Crowther**		Kogi State Polytechnic	Lokoja, Kogi State	Active	
**Alabata**		Federal University of Agriculture, Abeokuta	Abeokuta, Ogun State	Active	
**Amba loko**		College of Education, Katsina-Ala	Katsina-Ala, Benue State	Active	
**Ameh Oboni**		Kogi State University	Anyigba, Kogi State	Active	
**Asa**		Kwara State Polytechnic	Ilorin, Kwara State	Active	
**Ashanti**		Delta State University of Science and Technology	Ozoro, Delta State	Active	
**Azania**		College of Education, Warri	Warri, Delta State	Active	
**Bakassi**		University of Cross River State	Calabar, Cross River State	Active	
**Barkin Kada**		Kaduna Polytechnic	Kaduna, Kaduna State	Active	
**Benikrukru**		Rivers State University	Port Harcourt, Rivers State	Active	
**Bermuda 1**		University of Nigeria, Nsukka Campus	Nsukka, Enugu State	Active	
**Bermuda 2**		University of Nigeria, Enugu Campus	Enugu, Enugu State	Active	
**Biafra**		Akanu Ibiam Federal Polytechnic	Unwana, Ebonyi State	Active	
**Damissa**		Ahmadu Bello University	Zaria, Kaduna State	Active	
**Egbesu**		Niger Delta University, Yenagoa Campus	Yenagoa, Bayelsa State	Active	
**Ekamba**		Uyo City Polytechnic	Uyo, Akwa Ibom State	Active	
**Ekpe**		Abia State Polytechnic	Aba, Abia State	Active	
Ekumenyi		Federal College of Agriculture	Ishiagwu, Ebonyi State	Active	
**El-Kanemi**		Benue State Polytechnic	Okpokwu, Benue State	Active	
**Eluku**		Lagos State University of Science and Technology	Ikorodu, Lagos State	Active	
**Ese-Ovia**		Benin Polytechnic	Benin City, Edo State	Active	
**Eti-oni**		Osun State College of Technology	Esa-Oke, Osun State	Active	
**Eti-Osa**		Yaba College of Technology	Lagos, Lagos State	Active	
**Ewekoko**		Lagos State University	Ojo, Lagos State	Active	
**Futa Jallon 2**		University of Benin, Ekenwan Campus	Benin City, Edo State	Active	
**Gwadana**		Federal Polytechnic Nasarawa	Nasarawa, Nasarawa State	Active	
Gwaram		Federal University Duste (FUD)	Duste, Jigawa State	Active	
**Idi Ogun**		Federal Polytechnic, Offa	Offa, Kwara State	Active	
**Ifi 1**		University of Agriculture, Makurdi	Makurdi, Benue State	Active	
**Ifi 2**		Benue State University	Makurdi, Benue State	Active	
**Igbosere**		Federal College of Fisheries and Marine Technology	Victoria Island, Lagos State	Active	
**Igogo**		Rufus Giwa Polytechnic	Owo, Ondo State	Active	
**Ikenga**		Federal Polytechnic, Nekede	Nekede, Owerri West	Active	
**Ikogosi**		Federal University of Technology Akure	Akure, Ondo State	Active	
**Ikogosi 1**		Adeyemi College of Education	Ondo, Ondo State	Active	
**Ikoro**		Michael Okpara University of Agriculture	Umudike, Abia State	Active	
**Ikpitan**		Federal College of Education Technical, Ekiadolor	Benin City, Edo State	Active	
**Inikpi Dragon**		Federal Polytechnic, Idah	Idah, Kogi State	Active	
**Kalakuta**		Federal Polytechnic, Oko	Oko, Anambra State	Active	
**Kanem Bornu**		Auchi Polytechnic	Auchi, Edo State	Active	
**Kanta Bakassi**		University of Cross River State, Calabar Campus	Calabar, Cross River State	Active	
**Kanta Benikrukru**		Kenule Beeson Saro-Wiwa Polytechnic	Bori City, Rivers State	Active	
**Kanta Ethiopia**		Delta State University, Abraka	Abraka, Delta State	Active	
**Kanta Okemini**		Madonna University, Okija Campus	Okija, Anambra State	Active	
**Katanga**		Abia State University	Uturu, Abia State	Active	
**Kenneth Kaunda**		Imo State University	Owerri, Imo State	Active	
**Kilimanjaro**		Enugu State University of Science and Technology	Enugu, Enugu State	Active	
**Kiriji**		University of Lagos	Lagos, Lagos State	Active	
**Kofina**		Nuhu Bamalli Polytechnic	Zaria Kaduna State	Active	
**Koma**		Modibbo Adama Federal University of Technology, Yola	Girei, Adamawa State	Active	
**Kudeti**		The Polytechnic, Ibadan	Ibadan, Oyo State	Active	
**Kudeti 2**		Adeseun Ogundoyin Polytechnic, Eruwa	Eruwa, Oyo State	Active	
**Lake Alor**		Delta State Polytechnic, Ogwashi-Uku	Ogwashi-Uku, Delta State	Active	
**Lake Chad**		University of Maiduguri	Maiduguri, Borno State	Active	
Limpopo		Bendel State College of Agriculture	Anwai, Bendel State	Inactive	
Mount Patti		Federal University Lokoja	Lokoja, Kogi State	Active	
**Moriqua**		University of Calabar	Calabar, Cross River State	Active	
**Naraguta**		Federal University of Technology, Owerri	Owerri, Imo State	Active	
**Obanta**		Olabisi Onabanjo University	Ago-Iwoye, Ogun State	Active	
**Odudu**		Akwa Ibom State Polytechnic	Ikot Ekpene, Akwa Ibom State	Active	
**Oduduwa**		Obafemi Awolowo University	Ile-Ife,Osun State		
**Ofuobi**		Federal College of Education (Technical), Asaba	Asaba, Delta State	Active	
**Ogbuide**		Chukwuemeka Odumegwu Ojukwu University	Uli, Anambra State	Active	(Note: Chapter formed at Anambra State University of Science & Technology, now Chukwuemeka Odumegwu Ojukwu University.)
**Ogoni**		Abubakar Tafawa Balewa University	Bauchi, Bauchi State	Active	
**Ogunpa**		University of Ibadan	Ibadan, Oyo State	Active	
**Okemeje**		Osun State Polytechnic	Iree, Osun State	Active	
**Okemini**		University of Port Harcourt	Port Harcourt	Active	
**Oke-Ovia**		Edo State College of Agriculture Iguoriakhi	Iguoriakhi, Edo State	Active	
**Oloibiri**		Federal University of Petroleum Resources	Effurun, Delta State	Active	
**Olumo**		Moshood Abiola Polytechnic	Abeokuta, Ogun State	Active	
**Omambala**		Chukwuemeka Odumegwu Ojukwu University, Igbariam Campus	Igbariam, Anambra State	Active	
**Oroona**		Federal Polytechnic, Ilaro	Ilaro, Ogun State	Active	
**Qua**		Heritage Polytechnic	Eket, Akwa Ibom State	Active	
**River Benue**		Nasarawa State University	Keffi, Nasarawa State	Active	
**Rocky Olota**		Federal Polytechnic, Ado-Ekiti	Ado-Ekiti, Ekiti State	Active	
**Rwanda**		Ramat Polytechnic	Maiduguri, Borno State	Active	
**Sahara**		Usuman Danfodiyo University	Sokoto, Sokoto State	Active	
**Sanaga**		Igbinedion University, Okada	Okada, Edo State	Active	
**Sancta Ika**		University of Delta, Agbor Campus	Agbor, Delta State	Active	
**Sardauna**		Federal Polytechnic, Mubi	Mubi, Adamawa State	Active	
**Shango**		University of Uyo	Uyo, Akwa Ibom State	Active	
**Shiroro**		Federal University of Technology	Minna, Niger State	Active	
**Somalia**		University of Abuja	Abuja	Active	
**Soun**		Ladoke Akintola University of Technology	Ogbomoso, Oyo State	Active	
**Soweto**		Ebonyi State University	Abakaliki, Ebonyi State	Active	
**Sub Damissa**		Bayero University Kano	Kano, Kano State	Active	
**Sub Etiosa**		Federal College of Education (Technical), Akoka	Akoka, Lagos State	Active	
**Swem Karagbe**		Fidei Polytechnic, Gboko	Gboko, Benue State	Active	
**Takuruku**		Rev. Fr. Moses Orshio Adasu University, Makurdi	Makurdi, Benue State	Active	(Note: Chapter formed at Benue State University, which is now called the Rev. Fr. Moses Orshio Adasu University, Makurdi.)
**Udi**		Ambrose Alli University	Ekpoma, Edo State	Active	
**Zambezi**		Nnamdi Azikiwe University	Awka, Anambra State	Active	
**Zarama**		University of Jos	Jos, Plateau State	Active	
**Zobi**		University of Ilorin	Ilorin, Kwara State	Active	
**Zuma**		Dorben Polytechnic	Garam, Niger State	Active	(Note: Chapter was formed when the polytechnic was at its original location in Bwari, Abuja.)
**zazahu**		Kaduna State University	Kaduna, Kaduna State	Active	

== See also ==
- Confraternities in Nigeria
- List of confraternities in Nigeria
