= De Norsemen Kclub of Nigeria =

Nigerian confraternity

- Founded: 1983; 43 years ago University of Port Harcourt
- Type: Nigerian Confraternity
- Affiliation: Independent
- Status: Active
- Scope: International
- Motto: "Service to Humanity"
- Symbol: Shield
- Publication: Anchorage
- Nickname: SVC, Adventurers
- Other names: National Association of Adventurers; Supreme Vikings Confraternity
- Headquarters: Port Harcourt; Nigeria
- Website: www.denorsemenkclub.org

De Norsemen Kclub International, also known as the Supreme Vikings Confraternity, is an international humanitarian and fraternal organisation. It is a non-governmental and socio-cultural organization founded at the University of Port Harcourt in 1983 and registered with the Corporate Affairs Commission of Nigeria in 1993. The organisation's international headquarters is in Port Harcourt, Rivers State, Nigeria. It was established by young people desirous of instilling a culture of charity and patriotism. The fraternity includes branches in over sixty countries.

== History ==
De Norsemen Kclub originated as the Supreme Vikings Confraternity, socio-cultural fraternity at the University of Port Harcourt in Port Harcourt, Nigeria in 1983 by a former member of the Buccaneer Confraternity. Its founders were male students who wanted to encourage a culture of service, charity, and patriotism within religio-cultural values. The fraternity expanded to other university campuses in Nigeria.

De Norsemen Kclub International was registered with the Corporate Affairs Commission of Nigeria as a non-governmental and socio-cultural organization on 19 July 1993. It is also registered in several countries where it has international chapters. It is a structured brotherhood with an emphasis on discipline, personal development, community development, and humanitarian service, civic responsibility, human rights, and social justice. The fraternity is non-partisan.

== Symbols ==
De Norsemen Kclub uses European Viking and Norse symbolism. It is a hierarchical brotherhood, themed as a ship with a crew of brothers and sailors. Members and officers are referred to by nautical terms, such as sailor, sailing skipper, and guv’nor. The ship (longboat) symbolizes journey, unity, and purpose. Its symbol is the shield, representing the defense of truth and justice. The fraternity celebrates De Norseman Day each October, a traditional time for celebrations based on Norse mythology.

The organization’s motto is "Service to Humanity". Its publication is the Anchorage. Its nicknames include SVC and Adventurers.

== Activities ==
De Norseman Kclub hosts annual convergences and leadership summits for its members. Its members are involved in humanitarian outreach such as medical missions, disaster relief, and support for underprivileged communities. It also supports education by providing scholarships. The fraternity provides aid to physically challenged and indigent individuals. Other service initiatives include visits to prisons, orphanages, hospitals, and homes for widows.

Annually on 15 October, the fraternity celebrates De Norseman Day, during which members support displaced and underprivileged individuals by distributing food items such as rice, clothing, garri, groundnut oil, palm oil, and salt. Other service initiatives include visits to prisons, orphanages, hospitals, and homes for widows. It also organizes public lectures, symposiums, and peace education programs to discuss government policies and security challenges. Its members have also spoken against war, attempted to broker peace between warring factions, and sponsored a campaign in support of the former Nigerian Special Anti-Robbery Squad (SARS).

== Membership ==
Membership is open to male graduates and professionals who meet the organization's moral and intellectual criteria. Applicants must have a university degree and a verifiable means of livelihood.

== Organizational structure ==
De Norsemen Kclub operates under a centralized constitution and organizational hierarchy, consisting of an international board of trustees, the Sailyn Council (international executive council), national executive councils, Norsemen advisory councils, state patrols (state councils), and flotilas (local chapters). The chief officer in the international president general, while state councils are headed by guv'nors. The fraternity's international headquarters is in Port Harcourt, Rivers State, Nigeria.

== Chapters ==
Nigerian chapters were originally at colleges but are now community-based in 33 states of Nigeria and the federal capital Abuja. Some of its chapters include Akwa Ibom State, Bonny, Cross River State, Ebonyi State, Lagos State, Oyo State, River State. De Norsemen Kclub International also has chapters in more than sixty countries, including the United States, Canada, the United Kingdom, Germany, Italy, Belgium, China, Vietnam, Philippines, Malaysia, Cambodia, South Africa, India, Turkey, Cyprus, Togo, the United Arab Emirates, and Ghana.

== Controversies and public perception ==
Although registered as an NGO, De Norsemen Kclub International is sometimes conflated with Nigerian campus cults or confraternities in Nigeria, with its members being called "cultists" and "gangsters". For decades, a branch of the fraternity, the Junior Vikings Confraternity, was in the news for violent activities. However, the organization has denied involvement in illegal or violent activities and emphasized its commitment to civic engagement and the law. A 2020 academic study carried out by scholars at Ebonyi State University concluded that "De Norsemen Kclub is not associated with any form of cultism, they operate under the sovereign constitution of Nigeria and has right like other nongovernmental organisations to make peace and resolve conflict in Nigeria."

On 7 September 2019, police arrested twenty members of the fraternity who were attending an annual convergence in Enugu State. They were charged with belonging to an “an unlawful society" and registering "with the name De Norsemen Kclub Inc. under the disguise of unlawful society on 6th and 7th days of September 2019, gather themselves under the guise and held the meeting of Vikings Confraternity, an unlawful society and thereby committed an offence punishable under Section 8 of Public Order (Prohibition of Secret Cults and their activities) Law No. 17 Revised of Enugu State of Nigeria 2009". However, in June 2023, chief magistrate Mbah released the men, saying that the prosecution failed to prove its case.

== See also ==
- Confraternities in Nigeria
- List of confraternities in Nigeria
