= Students' Union of Obafemi Awolowo University =

The Students' Union of Obafemi Awolowo University, also known as Great Ife Students' Union, is a leading Students' Union in Nigeria and Sub-Saharan Africa. The Obafemi Awolowo University Students' Union is a student body consisting of over thirty-three thousand students of the great Obafemi Awolowo University.

The Students' Union is known for defending students' rights around Africa. On 11 March 2010, the Students' Union, led by Alaje A. Paul, President of the organization at the time, participated in a protest in F.C.T. Abuja in defense of sections S144 and 145 of the Nigerian Constitution.

Past leaders of the Students' Union include Anthony Fashayo, Lanre Legacy, Ola Diamonds, Akinola Saburi, Deviano, Paul Alaje, Fredrick Joel, Ibikunle Isaac, Akande Omotayo, Folahan Olayiwola (REFORM), Ojo Abbas Akinremi (LoRDFem)

== List of past leadership ==
President – Adelani David Oluwatodimu ‘’Itabi’’

Vice-President – Falade Iyanuoluwa Aanuoluwapo "Iyanu"

Secretary-general ISA Habeeb Oke "OPEYEMI"

Public Relations Officer – Olowosile Joseph Oreoluwa "WÀ Á LÀ"

Financial secretary -- Ogunleye Oluwadamilare "FACT"

Assistant secretary General – Usman Yinka Okunola "Comrade Ola"

Welfare director -- Shuaib-Osunleke Musab Okunola "MusAb "

Director of social and culture– Abubakre David Opeoluwa "HADO"

Director of Sport – OGINNI G Ayotomiwa “Tommy"

== Current leadership Of The Students' Representative Council ==
Speaker – Hon. Awe Adedamola ‘’Awe’’

Deputy Speaker -- Hon. Shankar "Shankar”

Clerk -- Hon. Deborah Ayeni “Deborah”

== Judicial Council ==
Lord Chancellor Lord Justice AdeAde

== Committees Of The Union ==
1. Budget & Finance Committee -- Chairman - Hon. Ajao Sodiq "Enimofe" Secretary - Hon. Banmikole Festus "A.Primes" PRO - Hon. Mayowa Financial Secretary - Hon. Adeniyi Sodiq “Sodiq”

2. Transport Management Commission -- Chairman - Hon. Fatoyinbo Azeez “AZ” Secretary - Hon. Adewoyin Feranmi “Feran” PRO - Hon. OlaGoriade Olateru “Gori”

3. Select Committee -- Chairman - Vacant Secretary - Vacant PRO - Vacant
