= National Association of Seadogs =

Confraternity organization in Nigeria

- NAS
- Founded: October 1952; 74 years ago University College, Ibadan
- Type: Nigerian Confraternity
- Affiliation: Independent
- Status: Active
- Scope: International
- Motto: "Against all moribund conventions"
- Colors: White, Red, and Black
- Symbol: Skull & Cross Bones
- Members: 25,000+ lifetime
- Nickname: Seadogs, Saylors
- Headquarters: Plot 55, Gado Nasko Road; Kubwa, Abuja, Federal Capital Territory; Nigeria
- Website: www.nas-int.org

The National Association of Seadogs, also known as Pyrates Confraternity, is a confraternity organization in Nigeria. The group was founded by seven undergraduate students of the University of Ibadan in 1952 to support human rights and social justice in Nigeria.

== History ==
Due to the increase of tribalism in the social life of students and the increasing population of "wealthy" students to a relatively few "poorer" students in the University College, Ibadan, the National Association of Seadogs was formed as a body in order to combat these societal ills. It was founded in 1952 by seven friends who adopted the name "Magnificent 7 or The Original 7". They are:

- Ikpehare Aig-Imoukhuede
- Olumuyiwa Awe
- Sylvanus U. Egbuche
- Pius Oleghe
- Nathaniel Oyelola (Late)
- Ralph Opara (Late)
- Wole Soyinka

The Pyrates Confraternity went on to become the only confraternity on Nigerian campuses for almost twenty years. Membership into the confraternity was open to students who were bright academically regardless of their tribe or religion. To date, over 25,000 people have belonged to the organization at various stages.

The Pyrates Confraternity was registered with the Nigerian Federal Ministry of Internal Affairs under the Land (Perpetual Succession) Act Cap 98 with the name "The National Association of Seadogs". Its headquarters are at Plot 55, Gado Nasko Road in Kubwa, Abuja, FCT, Nigeria.

== Symbols ==
The Pyrates logo is the Skull and Bones in red, black, and yellow. Members are known as Seadogs and Saylors. Its motto is "Against all moribund conventions". The organization has several sayings used as a sign of respect or greeting, including "Odas is Odas" ("Orders is Orders"), "No Friend No Foe", and "Absolutely No Lagging". Members are known as Seadogs and Saylors.

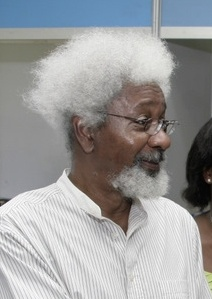
Wole Soyinka, a founding member of the Pyrates

== Chapters ==
Pyrates has branches throughout Nigeria and in Australia, Canada, Japan, Netherlands, Republic of Ireland, South Africa, the United Kingdom, and the United States.

== Notable members ==
- Wole Soyinka, awarded the 1986 Nobel Prize in Literature

== Controversies and member misconduct ==
Some sinister confraternities have been formed to copy the Pyrates confraternity which led the Pyrates confraternity to dissociate itself from these organizations and also operate outside university campuses. The confraternity is also seen as a "political opponent" after several members in Port Harcourt were detained in jail for participating in the disruption of election campaigns in 1997.
