= Kubwa =

Residential district in Bwari, Nigeria

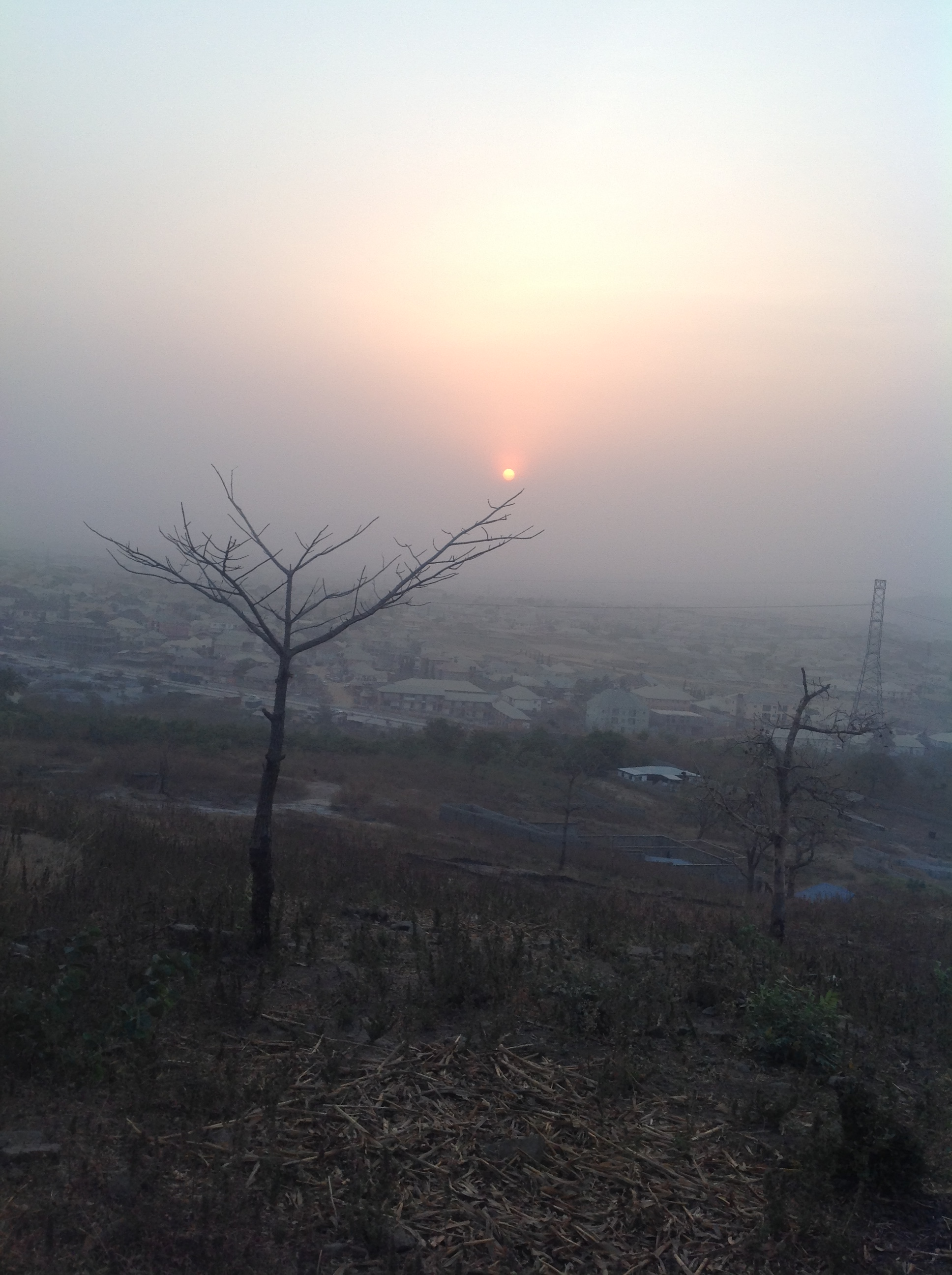
Sunrise scene from peak of rocky hills of Kubwa Arab Road.

Kubwa is a residential district in Bwari, one of the local government areas in the Federal Capital Territory in Nigeria. It is one of the major suburbs within the metropolitan area of Abuja.

The Kubwa Community has been in existence since 1990 and is considered to be the largest community in West Africa. The distance from Wuse Market to Kubwa is approximately 26 Kilometres. The Gbagyi people were the original residents, but Kubwa community became an entirely new and heterogeneous community as a result of government policy on the relocation of the Gwagi people, having the three major ethnic groups Hausa, Yorubas, Igbos and other ethnic minorities as the main inhabitants of the community; they are mainly civil servants, businessmen and women, commercial motorcycle riders, artisans and entrepreneurs.

== Sustainable actions of Kubwa community ==
Generally, the Kubwa community has grown and developed sustainably; however, it has been observed to be slow compared to other fast-growing cities in the world. Residents attribute that their new diversity of ethnicity and professions coupled to their new infrastructure of roads, markets, and supermarkets has created a durable base for their new community as well (remarkably) as doing so at a relatively affordable cost. Specific drivers of financial sustainability are attributed to the various types of businesses ranging from operating supermarkets, shops, general markets (such as Kubwa Market, site 2-phase 1 Market, etc.) engaged by community members. Other drivers include the fact that above 60 percent of the residents are civil servants who work with the federal and capital territory government organizations/institutions. The remaining are entrepreneurs, private security agents, low-cost housing builders, truck pushers, commercial motorcycle riders and real estate practitioners. Also, the establishment of cooperative societies and huge investments by community members have had a huge influence on Kubwa financial sustainability. The community-friendly investment flexibilities of the cooperative societies are main reasons for huge financial investment by community members which include monthly and weekly cash deposits, higher interest on investment as compared to other financial institutions, etc.

== Environmental management and conservation sustainability ==
Kubwa is known as a site of refuse dumping by the residents. There is a significant build up of waste in the area.

Also noteworthy is the fine on deforestation. Deforestation is discouraged in Nigeria by the government and supervised voluntarily by community members—particularly for economically sensitive crops such as mangoes, cashew trees - see Deforestation in Nigeria.

== Kubwa cultural identity ==
Due to the fact that the original occupants of Kubwa community were relocated by government policy, the cultural identity of the present community was found to be highly dispersed. Therefore, the major occupants are immigrants and Nigerians from either the three major ethnic nationalities (the Igbos, Hausas and Yorubas ) or the minority ethnicities, which have influenced the cultural identity and practice in the community. Some important events are organized to sustain these cultural identities, such the New yam festival of the Igbos New yam festival, The Shea-butter festival, The Igbo day celebration, Bwari day celebration, Yoruba Day celebration, The August meeting of the Igbos, encouragement to wear cultural/native outfits on cultural days and church days (Sundays). Some religious organizations - see Religion in Nigeria are also very active in this instance, such as the churches organize cultural days such as ST. Theresa Imo-Abia day. These events encourage cultural dancing competitions, dressings, native language speaking and practices.

Also, unplanned spending culture, inadequate basic infrastructure ( such as electricity, water, etc.) that are supposed to be provided by the government, which are mostly provided with personal income, the high prostitution/sex work activities observed at high spot areas, inadequate capacity of most individuals to undertake a feasibility study and develop business plan before engaging in businesses, high level of spending at night clubs, drinking bars and joints, the influence of neighbouring communities on the housing and living costs, community members who indulge in professionals business activities without appropriate trainings and exposures are unsustainable lifestyles practised by Kubwa Community members.

Other unsustainable lifestyles of Kubwa community include indiscriminate disposal of waste, dumping of waste along or into the canals, sewerage systems that are channels for water flows. This has also made the rivers unsafe for domestic uses. The community has witnessed regular deforestation and cutting down of trees for the purpose of buildings, infrastructural development, and burial grounds without plans to afforest or plant trees. The government and non-governmental organizations are not doing enough to sensitize and also enlighten community members on sustainable environmental management. Another unsustainable act is illegal construction of buildings and structures, which are not in line with the government-approved development plan.

The cultural identities of Kubwa community have been affected by members who most of the times dress in foreign attires, the majority of the community members speak in the English language or pidgin English language. The increased attention to western education was also identified as a major force to unsustainable cultural conservation.

== Further representative cultural features ==
Religion is the main factor driving sustainable livelihood of the community. Above 90 percent of Kubwa population belong to one religion or the other, and there are two major religions (Christian and Islam). This has brought the community together with several community development activities, such as donation of relief materials by some unions in the churches, organization of cultural/ethnic celebration days, regular meeting with popular slogan ‘be your brothers’ keeper’. These engagements at these religious platforms have encouraged sustainable community development. Also, the Islamic religion in the community has founded schools, relief centres that are primarily involved in educating and providing relief materials to their members and society at large. However, there have been few community conflicts resulting from inter and intra religious relationships and living within the same community.

Football Viewing Centres is another feature that has brought Kubwa community members together. Many youths find themselves in most of these centres viewing football matches. Just as an average Kubwa resident will always mention 'Football matches such as the English Premiership has brought real unity and friendliness in this community'. You will see young, old and even children come out to watch these matches. Community youths who come from different geopolitical regions in Nigeria, come together to form clubs; discuss businesses and career opportunities at the centres. These associations or coming together have started yielding developmental goals within the community, engaging the youths meaningfully is for the very important especially in reducing crimes. People drink a lot of alcohol at these centres which affect both personal and collective interest of the State.

Hanging Out Centres at Recreation Places is a rising phenomena in the community. And almost all of the relaxation gardens that were originally built for community members’ relaxation have now been converted to hangout centres, where alcohol and other forms of drinks are served. This activity brings together all grades and manner of individuals from the community who after their daily work, retire in these centres for relaxation and business discussions. Other things served are foods, roasted fish etc. These issues/factors are some overarching issues driving the sustainable and unsustainable development of the community.

== Climate ==
The climate of Kubwa is categorised as tropical. Kubwa experiences substantially less rain in the winter than it does in the summer. This climate falls under the Köppen and Geiger classification of Aw. In Kubwa, the yearly average temperature is 26.4 °C or 79.6 °F. Rainfall totals 1643 mm (64.7 inches) every year.

In the northern hemisphere is Kubwa. Here, summer lasts from late June until early September. The summer months are June, July, August, and September. January, February, April, May, June, July, September, October, November, and December are the busiest travel months.
