= Confraternities in Nigeria =

Social organizations at colleges and universities

Confraternities in Nigeria are secretive student groups within Nigerian higher education that have been involved in violence and organized crime since the 1980s. The exact death toll of confraternity activities is unclear. One estimate in 2002 was that 250 people had been killed in campus cult-related murders in the 1990s, while the Exam Ethics Project lobby group estimated that 115 students and teachers had been killed between 1993 and 2003.

A poster warning against confraternities in Nigeria. Note the depiction in the lower center of President Olusegun Obasanjo backed up by Jesus Christ.

== History ==
=== Origins ===
In 1952, author Wole Soyinka (later a Nobel Prize winner) and a group of six friends formed the Pyrate Confraternity at the elite University College, Ibadan, then part of the University of London. They dubbed themselves "Magnificent Seven" (G7). Soyinka and his confraternity peers observed that the university was dominated by wealthy students associated with the colonial government and a few poorer students who often mimicked the wealthy students; meanwhile, campus social life was dictated by tribal affiliation.

Soyinka would later note that the Pyrates wanted to differentiate themselves from "stodgy establishment and its pretentious products in a new educational institution different from a culture of the hypocritical and affluent middle class, different from alienated colonial aristocrats". The organization adopted the motto "Against all conventions", used the skull and crossbones as their logo, while members adopted pirate-themed confraternity names such as "Cap'n Blood" and "Long John Silver". Roughly analogous to the fraternities and sororities of North America, the confraternity proved popular among students.

The Supreme Eiye Confraternity, also known as the National Association of Airlords (NAA), formed in 1963 at the University of Ibadan, making it the second oldest confraternity after the Pyrate Confraternity.

=== Schism and rise of new groups ===
In 1972, Dr. Bolaji Carew (former provost of Adeniran Ogunsanya College of Education) and Kunle Adigun were expelled from the Pyrates confraternity. Carew went on to establish the Buccaneers Confraternity, or 'National Association of Sea Lords', replicating many elements of the Pyrates. According to researcher Bestman Wellington, inter-confraternity violence originated with the split between these groups. In reaction to this and other events, the Pyrates registered themselves under the name National Association of Seadogs (NAS) in 1980 and pulled the confraternity out of the universities.

Soyinka would later point to individuals who became accustomed to exerting power in the rigidly hierarchical confraternity and were unwilling to give it up, as to blame for the initial schism. As new groups formed, inter-group tensions led to fighting, though these were initially limited to fistfights.

In the late 1970s and early 1980s confraternities expanded rapidly. The Neo-Black Movement of Africa, and the associated Black Axe, emerged from the University of Benin in Edo State. In May 1978 The Green Circuit Association International (also known as the Maphite) also came from the University of Benin. In 1983, students at the University of Calabar in Cross River State founded the Eternal Fraternal Order of the Legion Consortium (the Klan Konfraternity), and the Supreme Vikings Confraternity (the Adventurers) were established the following year.

This period saw a drastic change in the role of the confraternities. The coup of Ibrahim Babangida in 1983 caused a large degree of political tension. Military leaders, beginning in the 1980s, began to see the confraternities as a check on the student unions and university staff, who were the only organized groups opposing military rule. The confraternities were thus provided payment and weapons to use against student activists, though the weapons were often used in deadly inter-confraternity rivalries.

Sociologist Emeka Akudi noted that some university vice-chancellors protected confraternities known to be violent and used them to attack students deemed troublesome. During this period the confraternities introduced a new tradition of carrying out traditional religious practices, including Vodun. Possibly in reaction to the changes, Wole Soyinka declared that the Seadogs should not operate on any university campuses in 1984.

=== Expansion from the universities ===
In the early 1990s, confraternity activities expanded in the Niger Delta. The Family Confraternity (the Campus mafia or the mafia), which modeled itself after the Italian Mafia, emerged. Shortly after their foundation, several students were expelled from Abia State University for cheating and "cultism", a reference to the voodoo-practicing confraternities, which marked a shift of confraternity activities from the university to off-of-campus.

The newly elected democratic government granted amnesty to all renounced cultists and university students began to renounce cultism across Nigeria. Because campuses were no longer a haven for them, the confraternities moved from the campuses to residential neighborhoods.

However, the incompetence of government officials and inadequate facilities to police campuses by university authorities led to the resurgence of cultism on the campuses. Renounced cultists who could not be protected by the law went back to their cult groups to seek protection from rival groups who had discerned their identity as a result of the renouncement ceremony. This resulted in a situation where cult groups were now well-established in and outside the campuses.

The Brotherhood of the Blood (also known as Two-Two or Black Beret), another notorious confraternity, was founded at Enugu State University of Science and Technology. Another cult, the Victor Charlie Boys, was established by Augustine Ahiazu when he was vice-chancellor of the Rivers State University of Science and Technology. The cults established in the early 1990s include Second Son of Satan (SSS), Night Cadet, Sonmen, Mgba Mgba Brothers, Temple of Eden, Trojan Horse, Jurists, White Bishops, Gentlemen Clubs, Fame, Executioners, Dreaded Friend of Friends, Eagle Club, Black Scorpion, Red Sea Horse, and Fraternity of Friends.

The Klansmen Konfraternity expanded its influence by creating a "street and creek" wing, Deebam, to gain territorial control for crime outside of the universities. In response, the Supreme Vikings Confraternity (SVC) established its own street and creek group, Deewell. When Deewell was unable to match Deebam, the SVC created a second confraternity wing, the Icelanders (German), which would eventually be led by militia leader Ateke Tom. The Outlaws, another well-known street and creek confraternity, began as a splinter group of the Icelanders.

In the late 1990s, all-female confraternities began to be formed. These include the Black Brazier (Bra Bra), the Viqueens, Daughters of Jezebel, and the Damsel. Female confraternities have supplied spies for allied male confraternities as well as acting as prostitution syndicates.

Members of confraternities such as the Neo-Black Movement have been investigated by law enforcement in countries including Canada, Italy, and the United Kingdom.

=== Obafemi Awolowo University murders ===
On July 10, 1999, one of the most notable single attacks occurred at Obafemi Awolowo University (OAU) in Ife. OAU had been considered one of the safest universities in the country, largely due to student-organized resistance to the confraternities. After one cult member was shot and killed during an attempted kidnapping in 1991, the confraternities appeared to stay away from the university. In February 1999, student leaders organized a campus-wide search, which found eight secret cult members who were stockpiling machine guns and other weapons in their dorm room. This enraged the Black Axe confraternity, who organized a murder squad that hacked the student union secretary-general to death in his bed and targeted other student leaders.

In a student assembly called the following day, the president of the Students' Union, who had escaped the killers by leaping from his window, demanded the resignation of Vice-Chancellor Wole Omole, who was seen as obstructing efforts to fight confraternities, such as by refusing to expel the eight cultists who had been found stockpiling weapons. A bounty of 10,000 naira (US$30) was offered for his capture and one vigilante group reportedly abducted Omole's wife as ransom for his surrender. Students also manned checkpoints and carried out searches for cult members still on campus, arresting suspects. In one case, students worried about police leniency stormed a police station to re-seize a suspect they had previously turned over.

Nigerian education minister Tunde Adeniran later dismissed Omole and ordered university administrators to eradicate confraternities from their campuses by September 1999. In response, hundreds of cult members publicly renounced their confraternity and cult-associated violence temporarily subsided.

== Current situation ==
During the first weeks of the school year, confraternity alumni and members recruit new members. Initiation ceremonies may involve severe beatings to test endurance. A 2001 research report said that male initiates may sometimes be required to drink blood or rape women. Among the all-female Jezebels or Amazons, prospective members may be required to undergo six rounds of rough sexual intercourse or fight with a group of women or against a much stronger man. Cults also charge annual membership fees of between 10,000 (US$80) and 30,000 naira.

Frequent criminal activity for cults includes intimidating professors into giving high grades, including by burning their cars or briefly abducting their children. Since the 1980s, confraternities have murdered people who are thought to have 'stolen' a member's girlfriend, or "sugar daddy" in the case of female groups. Female groups began operating as prostitution rings relatively early. The majority of confraternities, as of 2005, were engaged in a variety of money-making criminal activities, ranging from cybercrime to armed robbery and kidnapping. Cult members may also get money from political figures, who wish to intimidate their opponents.

The exact death toll of confraternity activities is unclear. One estimate in 2002 was that 250 people had been killed in campus cult-related murders in the 1990s, while the Exam Ethics Project lobby group estimated that 115 students and teachers had been killed between 1993 and 2003.

Confraternities are involved in the conflict in the Niger Delta. Campus cults have been accused of kidnapping foreign oil workers for ransom, while many of the militant groups, such as the Movement for the Emancipation of the Niger Delta (MEND), employ confraternity members as combatants; Soboma George, head of the street and creek confraternity The Outlaws, is also a MEND commander.

As confraternities have connections with political and military figures, they offer alumni networking opportunities after graduation. The Supreme Vikings Confraternity, for example, says that twelve members of the Rivers State House of Assembly are cult members.

== See also ==
- Crime in Nigeria
- List of confraternities in Nigeria
- Operation Wetie
- Confraternities
