= Abuja =

Capital of the Federal Republic of Nigeria

- Federal capital city and local government area
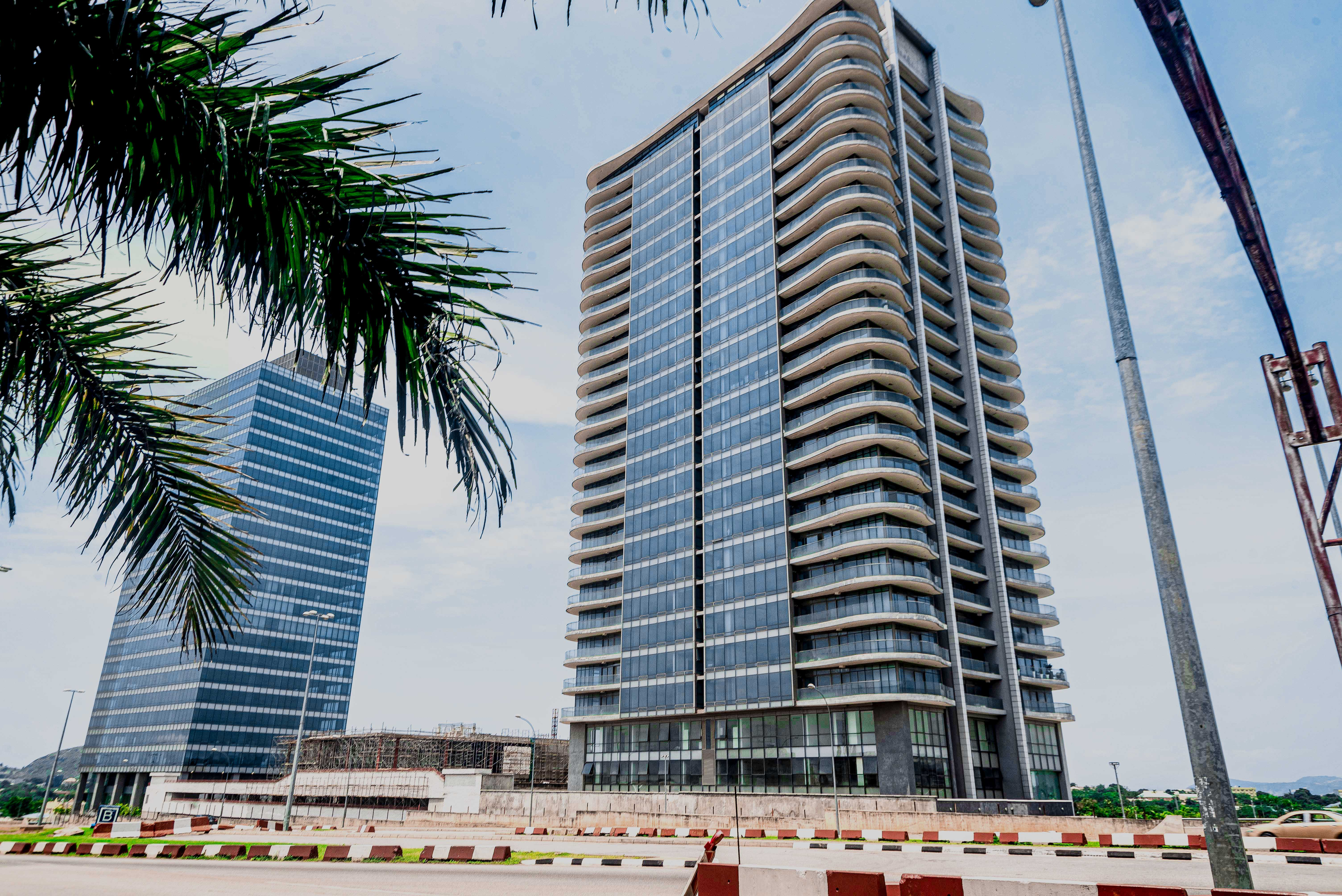
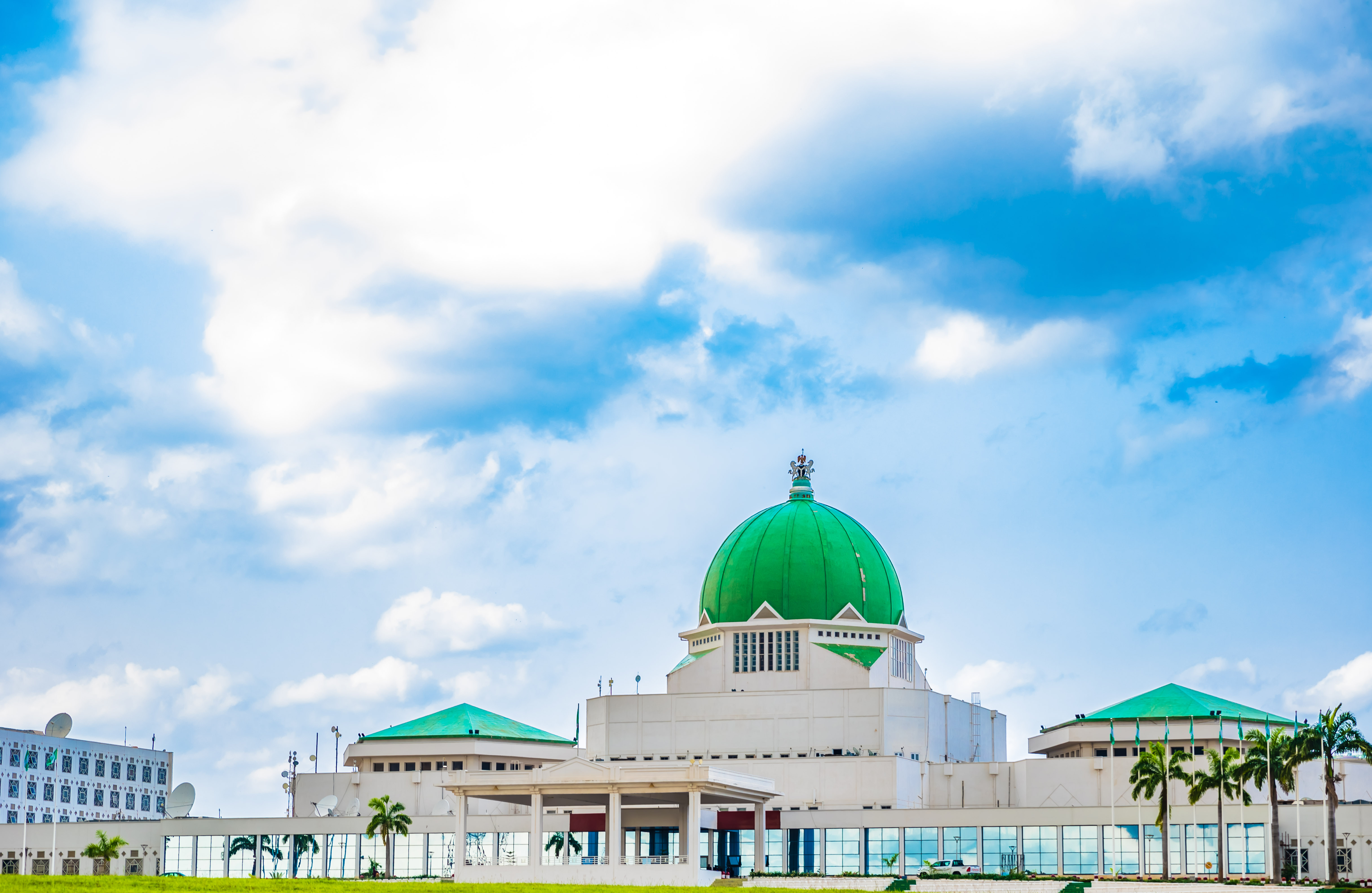
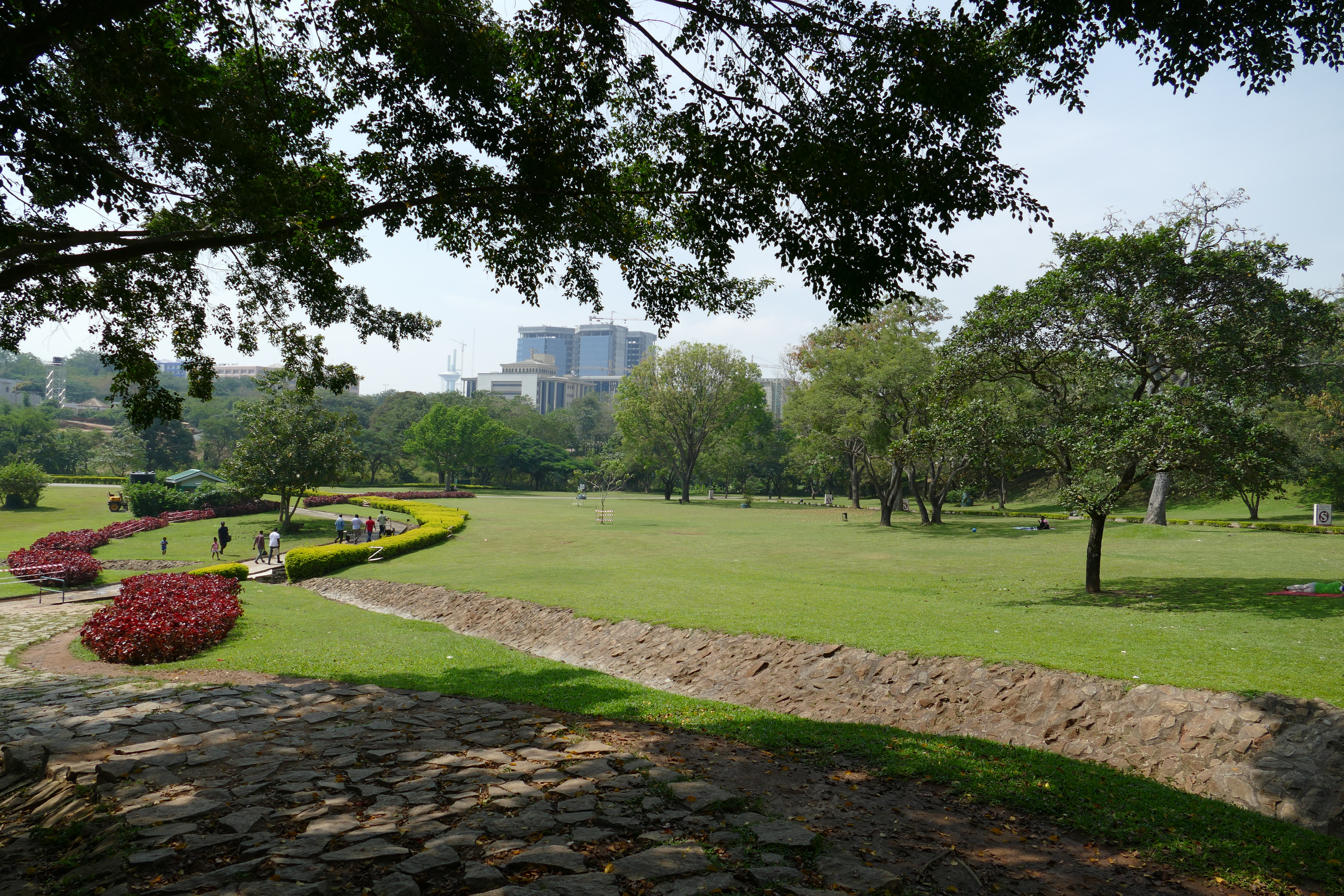
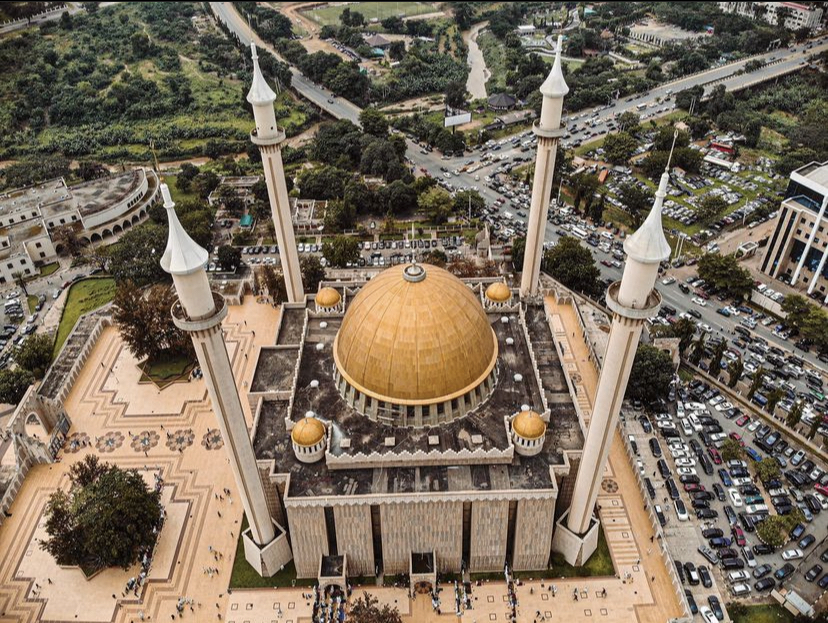
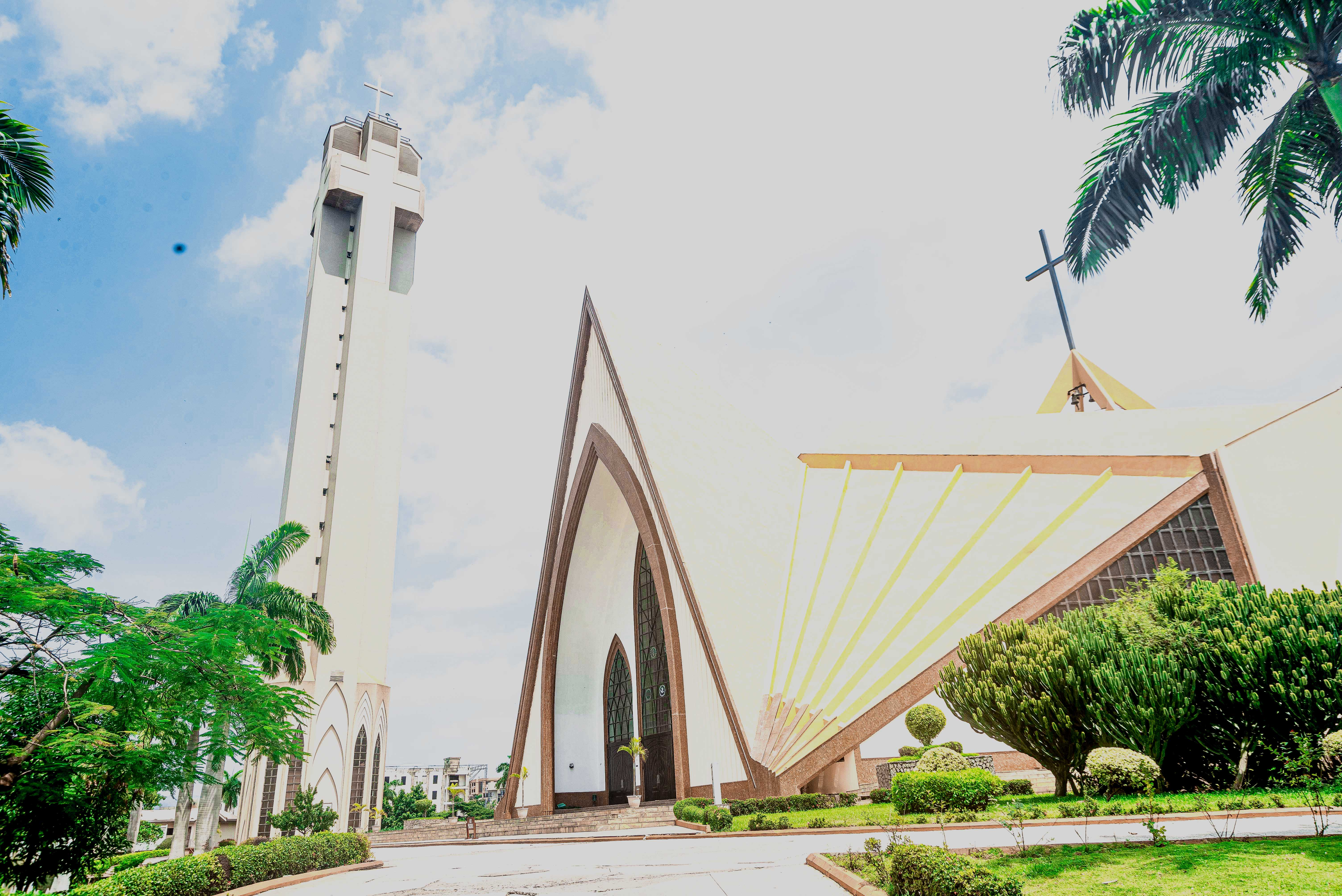
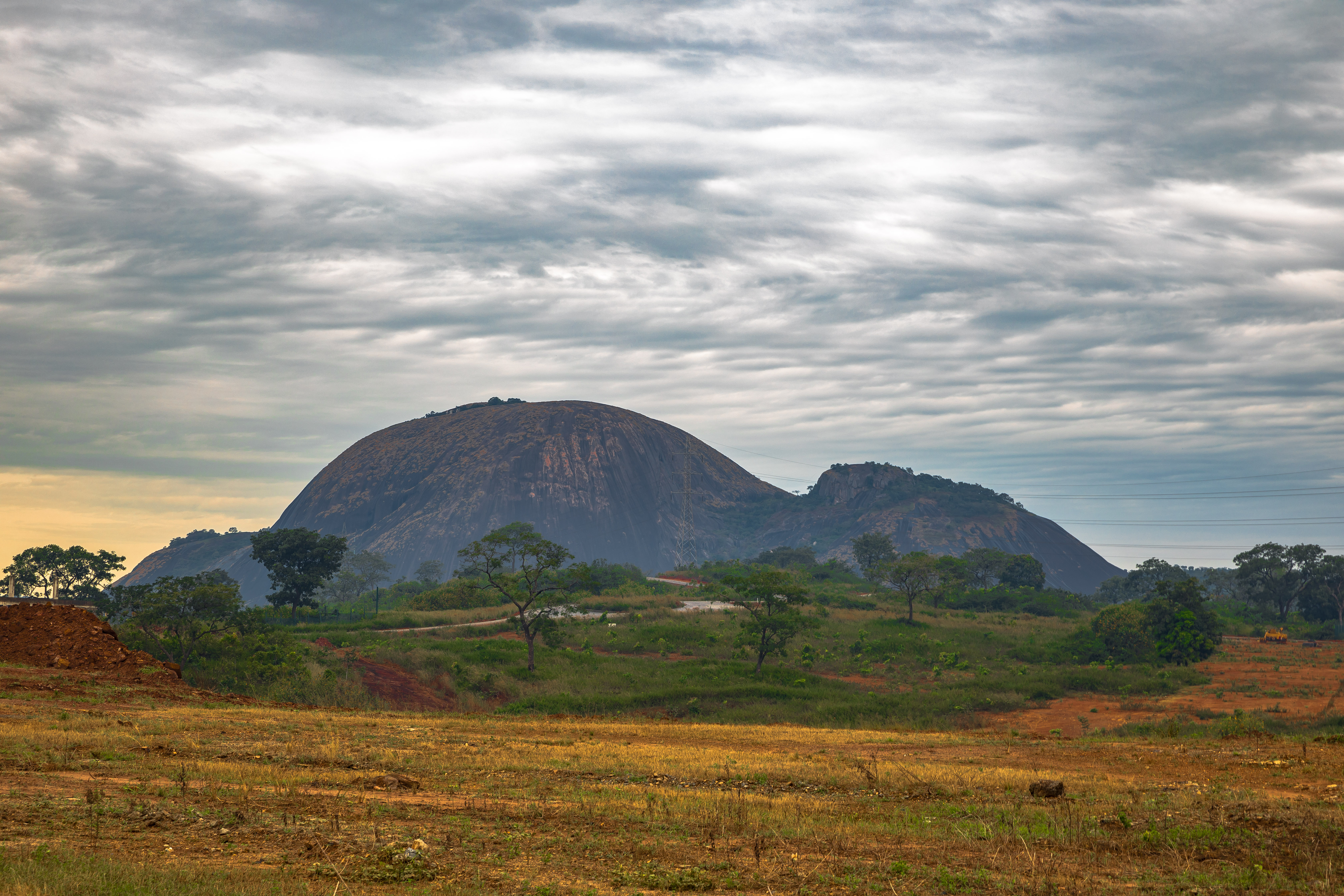
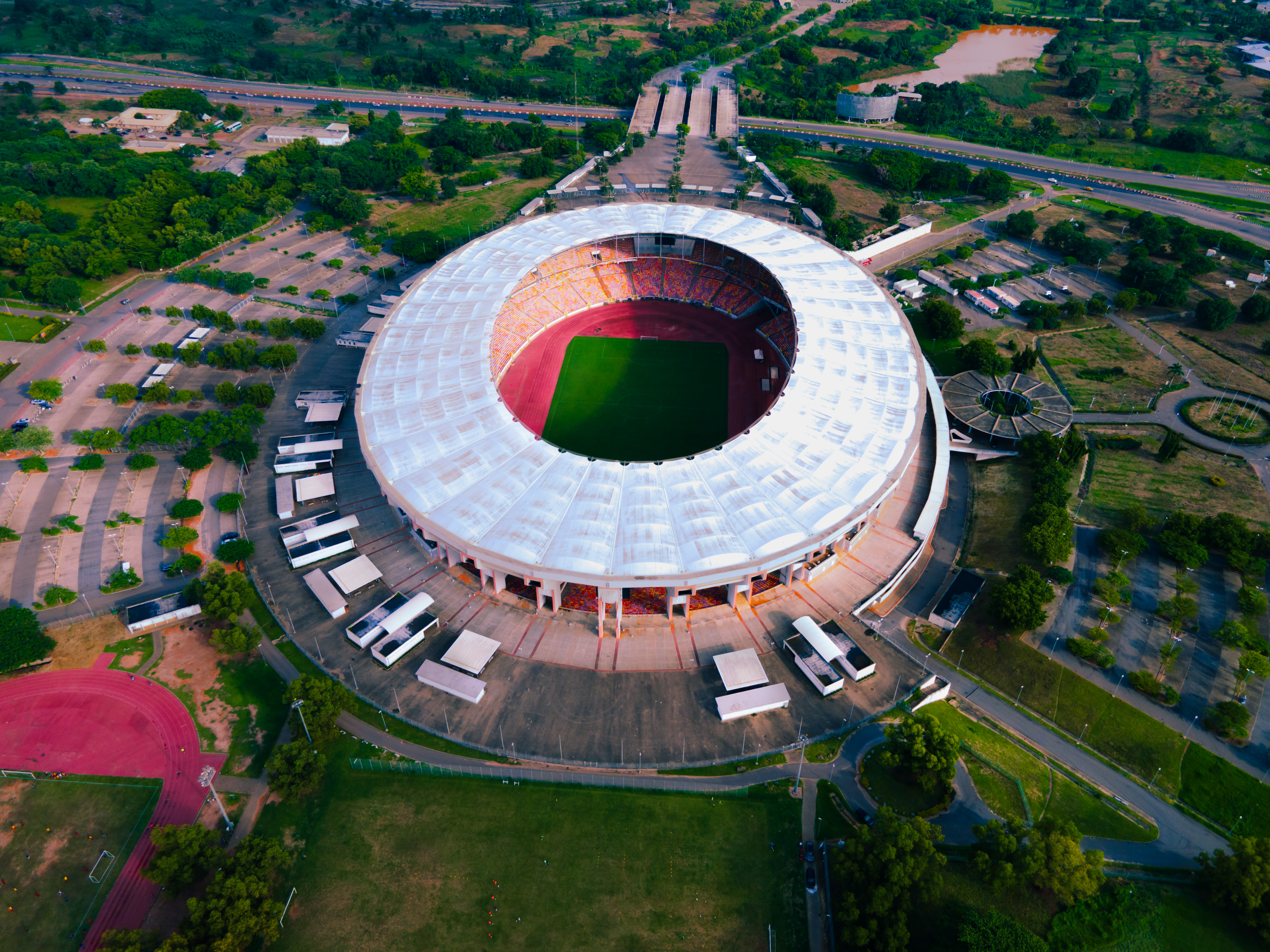
- World Trade Centre National Assembly Complex Millenium Park Abuja National Mosque National Christian Centre Aso Rock Moshood Abiola National Stadium

- Flag Seal
- Nickname: ABJ
- Interactive map of Abuja
- Location within Nigeria Location within Africa
- Coordinates: 9°4′N 7°29′E
- Country: Nigeria
- Territory: Federal Capital
- Settled: 1828
- Incorporated: 1 October 1984
- Declared capital: 12 December 1991
- Named for: Abu Ja

Government
  - Type: City management
  - Body: Abuja Metropolitan Management Council
  - Minister: Nyesom Wike

Area
  - Federal capital city and local government area: 1,476 km^{2} (570 sq mi)
  - Urban: 927 km^{2} (358 sq mi)
- Elevation: 360 m (1,180 ft)

Population (2026 estimate)
  - Federal capital city and local government area: 2,057,985
  - Rank: 7th
  - Density: 1,394/km^{2} (3,611/sq mi)
  - Urban: 3,770,000
  - Urban density: 4,066/km^{2} (10,530/sq mi)
  - Metro: 4,025,000
- Time zone: UTC+01:00 (WAT)
- Postal codes: 900211–900288
- Climate: Aw
- Website: fcta.gov.ng fcda.gov.ng myfctagov.ng

Abuja (/əˈbuːdʒə/) is the capital city of Nigeria, strategically situated at the geographic midpoint of the country within the Federal Capital Territory (FCT). As the seat of the Federal Government of Nigeria, it hosts key national institutions, landmarks, and buildings spread across its over 50 districts. It replaced Lagos (the most populous city in Nigeria) as the capital on 12 December 1991.

Abuja's geography is defined by Aso Rock, a 400-metre (1,300 ft) monolith left by water erosion. The Presidential Complex, National Assembly, Supreme Court, and much of the city extends to the south of the rock. Zuma Rock, a 725-metre (2,379 ft) monolith, lies just north of the city on the expressway to Kaduna.

At the 2006 census, the city of Abuja had a population of 776,298 and 179,674 households, making it one of the ten most populous cities in Nigeria (eighth place in 2006). According to the United Nations, Abuja grew by 139.7% between 2000 and 2010, making it the fastest-growing city in the world. As of 2015, the city is experiencing an annual growth of at least 35%, retaining its position as the fastest-growing city on the African continent and one of the fastest-growing in the world.

Major religious sites include the Nigerian National Mosque and the Nigerian National Christian Centre. The city is served by the Nnamdi Azikiwe International Airport. Abuja is known for being one of the few purpose-built capital cities in Africa, as well as being one of the wealthiest.

Abuja is Nigeria's administrative and political capital. It is also a key capital on the African continent due to Nigeria's geopolitical influence in regional affairs. Abuja is also a conference centre and hosts various meetings annually, such as the 2003 Commonwealth Heads of Government meeting and the 2014 World Economic Forum (Africa) meetings. Abuja joined the UNESCO Global Network of Learning Cities in 2016.

== History ==
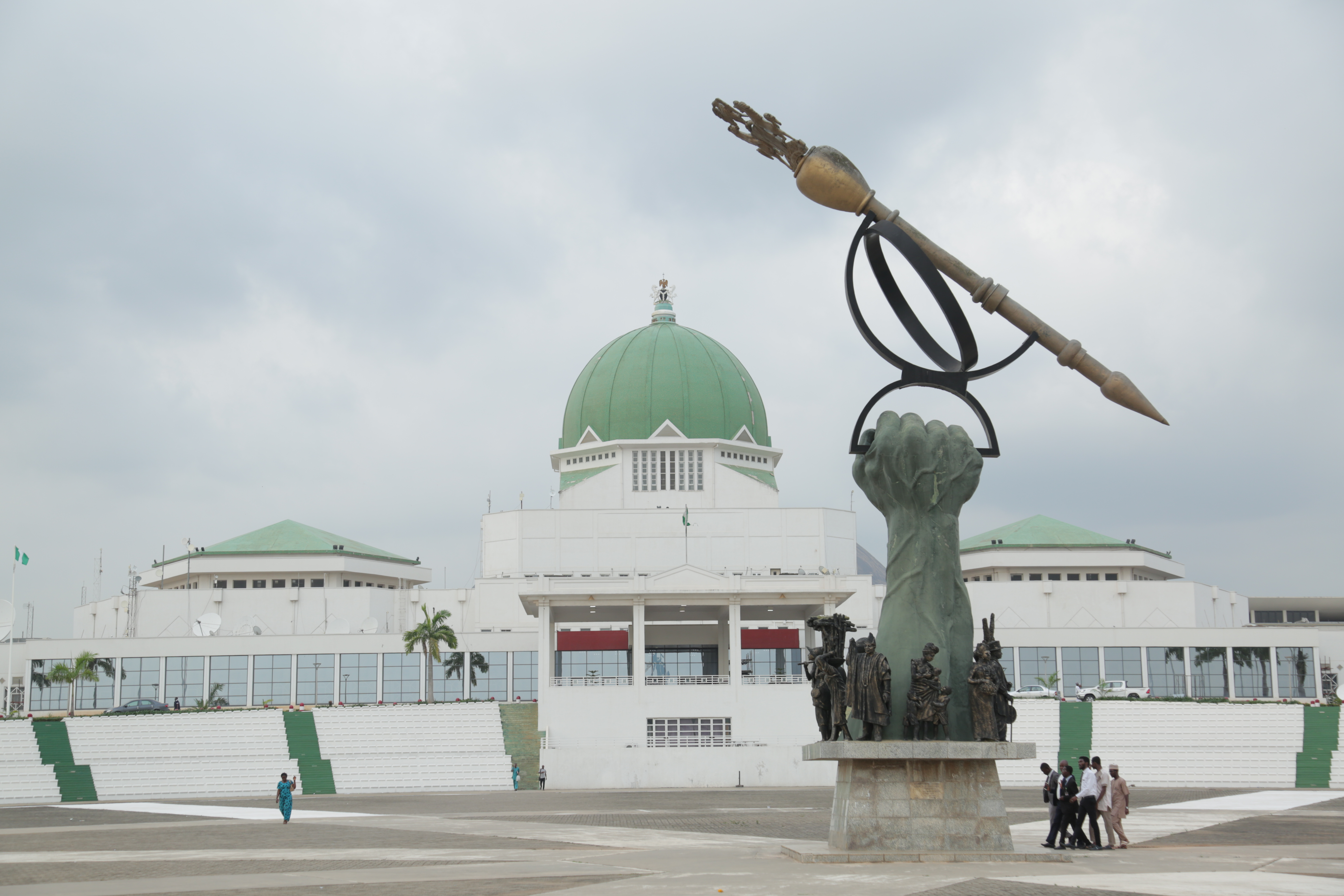
National Assembly Building with Mace, Abuja, Nigeria

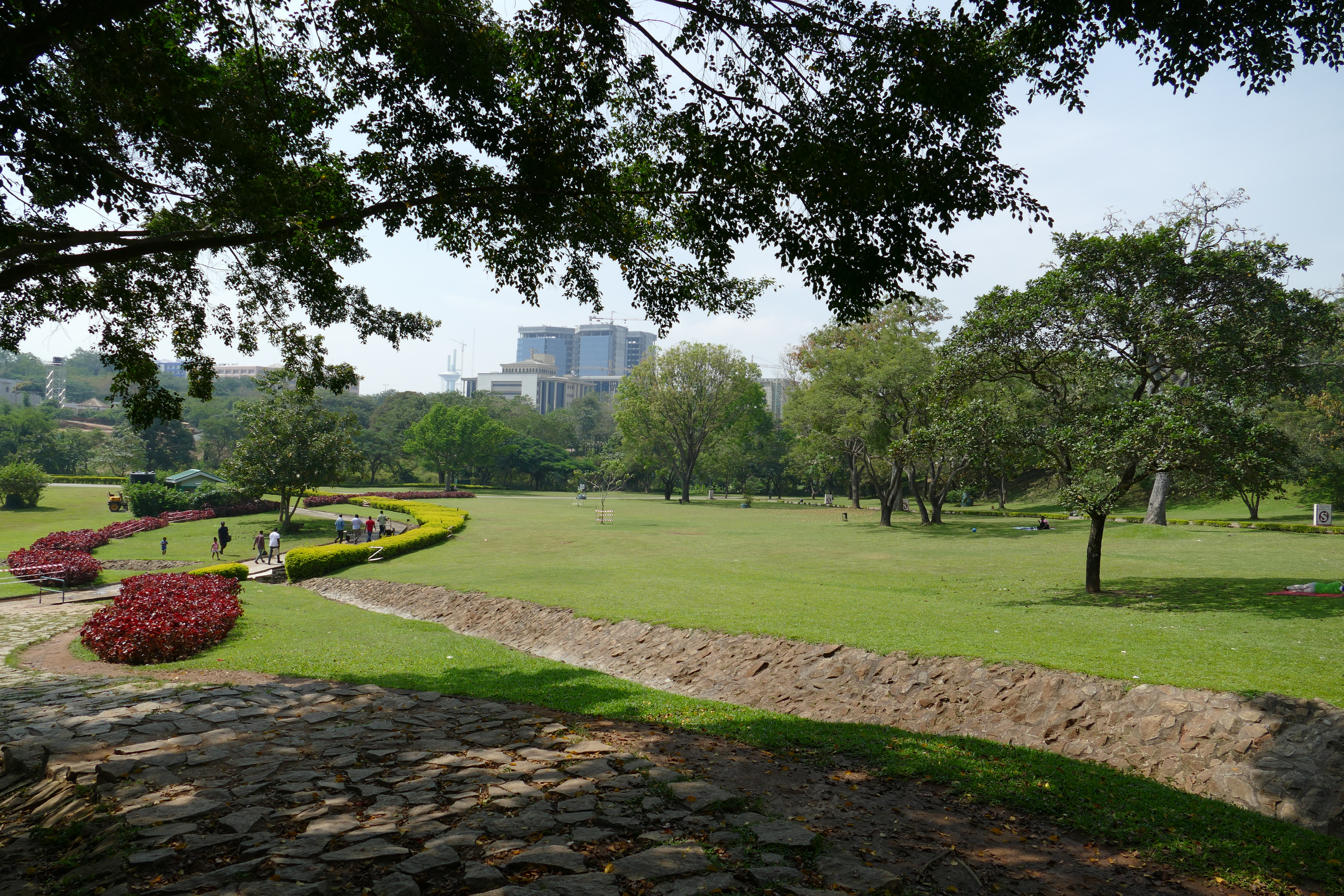
Millennium Park

Abuja was in the early 20th century the name of the nearby town now called Suleja.

The indigenous inhabitants of Abuja are the Abawa (Ganagana), Basa, Gwandara, Gbagyi (Gwari) having the majority population in the region. Other groups in the area include Egburra, Nupe and Koro. The Gwandara speaking people in Federal Capital Territory are mostly found in AMAC and Bwari Area Council. Some of their villages/settlements are Wuse, Asokoro now relocated to Sabon Wuse, Aso in Niger and other neighbouring states. Others are Karshi, Kurudu, Nyanya, Idu, Gwagwa, Jiwa, Sheretti, Karmo, Takunshara, Burum, Dutse Alhaji, Zuba, Kuje, Kwoi, Karonmagaji, Ija, Kanwu, and Sherre.

In light of the ethnic and religious divisions of Nigeria, plans had been devised since Nigeria's independence to have its capital in a place deemed neutral to all major ethnic parties, and also near all the regions of Nigeria. The location was eventually designated in the centre of the country in the early 1970s as it signified neutrality and national unity.

Another impetus for Abuja came because of Lagos' population boom that made that city overcrowded and conditions squalid. As Lagos was already undergoing rapid economic development, the Nigerian government felt the need to expand the economy towards the inner part of the country, and hence decided to move its capital to Abuja. The logic used was similar to the way Brazil planned its capital, Brasília.

The Federal Military Government of Nigeria promulgated Decree No. 6 on 4 February 1976, which initiated the removal of the Federal Capital from Lagos to Abuja. The initial work for Abuja's planning and implementation was carried out by the Military Government of Generals Murtala Mohammed and Olusegun Obasanjo. However, the foundation of Abuja was under the Administration of Shehu Shagari in 1979. Construction started in 1979 but, due to economic and political instability, the initial stages of the city were not complete until the late 1980s.

The move of Nigeria's Capital to Abuja was controversial, and the biggest opposition to it was led by Obafemi Awolowo. Awolowo, as a politician and a representative of the Yoruba people, defended their claims against the move of the Capital from Lagos. During the hotly-contested campaign for the presidency, he vowed to hire the Walt Disney Company to convert the new site (Abuja) into an amusement park if he was elected. However, after his election as president, Alhaji Shehu Shagari laid the first foundation for Abuja's infrastructure and pushed for its early completion. His first journey outside of Lagos after his election was to Abuja, where he visited contractors and workers on site to urge a speedy completion of the project. On his return, he confided in Alhaji Abubakar Koko his disappointment with the slow progress of work. Shehu Shagari rescheduled the planned relocation to Abuja from 1986 to 1992 which later proved difficult.

Abuja is a planned city built mainly in the 1980s based on a master plan by International Planning Associates (IPA), a consortium of three Wallace, Roberts, McHarg & Todd (WRMT – a group of architects) as the lead, Archi systems International (a subsidiary of the Howard Hughes Corporation), and Planning Research Corporation. The International Planning Associates (IPA) was commissioned in June 1977, by the Federal Capital Development Authority (FCDA) to produce the Abuja Master Plan and its regional grid. According to the terms of reference, the master planning process was to include a review of relevant data, selection of a capital city site, preparation of regional and city plans and the accompanying design and development standards manual. After winning the bid, and completing the project, the firms were disbanded.

The final report was submitted to the pioneer Executive Secretary of FCDA, Alhaji Abubakar Koko, on 15 February 1979. In the preface to the master plan, the following declaration was made by IPA:

"The master plan for Abuja the new Capital City of Nigeria represents the culmination of 18 months' work by the Federal Capital Development Authority (FCDA) board, and several advisory panel consultants. Without the unstinting efforts of these experts, the momentum now exhibited at the beginning of the actual implementation of the new capital could not have been achieved. The plan itself represents a milestone in the process of building the new capital city. It is a necessary element in the monumental effort about to be undertaken by the Nigerian people."

The master plan for Abuja defined the general structure and major design elements of the city that are now visible.

More detailed design of the central areas of the capital, particularly its monumental core and the Central Business District, was accomplished by Japanese architect Kenzo Tange with his team of city planners at Kenzo Tange and Urtec company.

Most countries relocated their embassies to Abuja, and many maintain their former embassies as consulates in Lagos, the commercial capital of Nigeria. Abuja is the headquarters of the Economic Community of West African States (ECOWAS) and the regional headquarters of OPEC. Abuja and the FCT have experienced huge population growth; it has been reported that some areas around Abuja have been growing at 20% to 30% per year. Squatter settlements and towns have spread rapidly in and outside the city limits. Tens of thousands of people have been evicted since former FCT minister Nasir Ahmad el-Rufai started a demolition campaign in 2003.

== Administration ==
The Abuja Municipal Area Council (AMAC) is the local government authority responsible for administering the city of Abuja. It operates under the oversight of the Federal Capital Territory Administration (FCTA), which governs the entire Federal Capital Territory (FCT). The AMAC's chairman is responsible for leading the council's activities and representing the interests of the municipality's residents. The Minister of the FCT, Nyesom Wike, heads the FCTA while AMAC's chairman is Christopher Zaka Maikalangu.

=== Phases ===
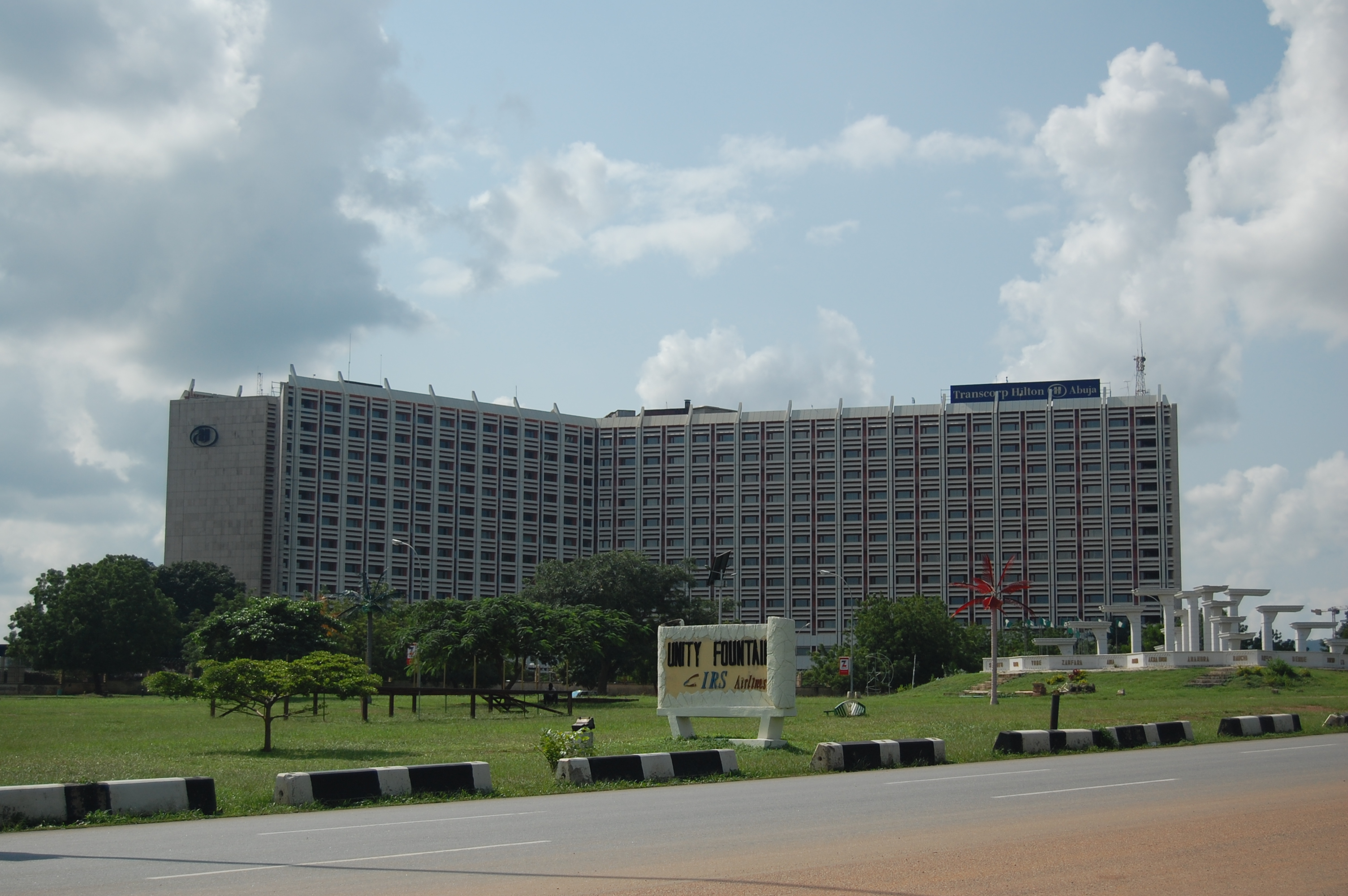
Hilton, Abuja

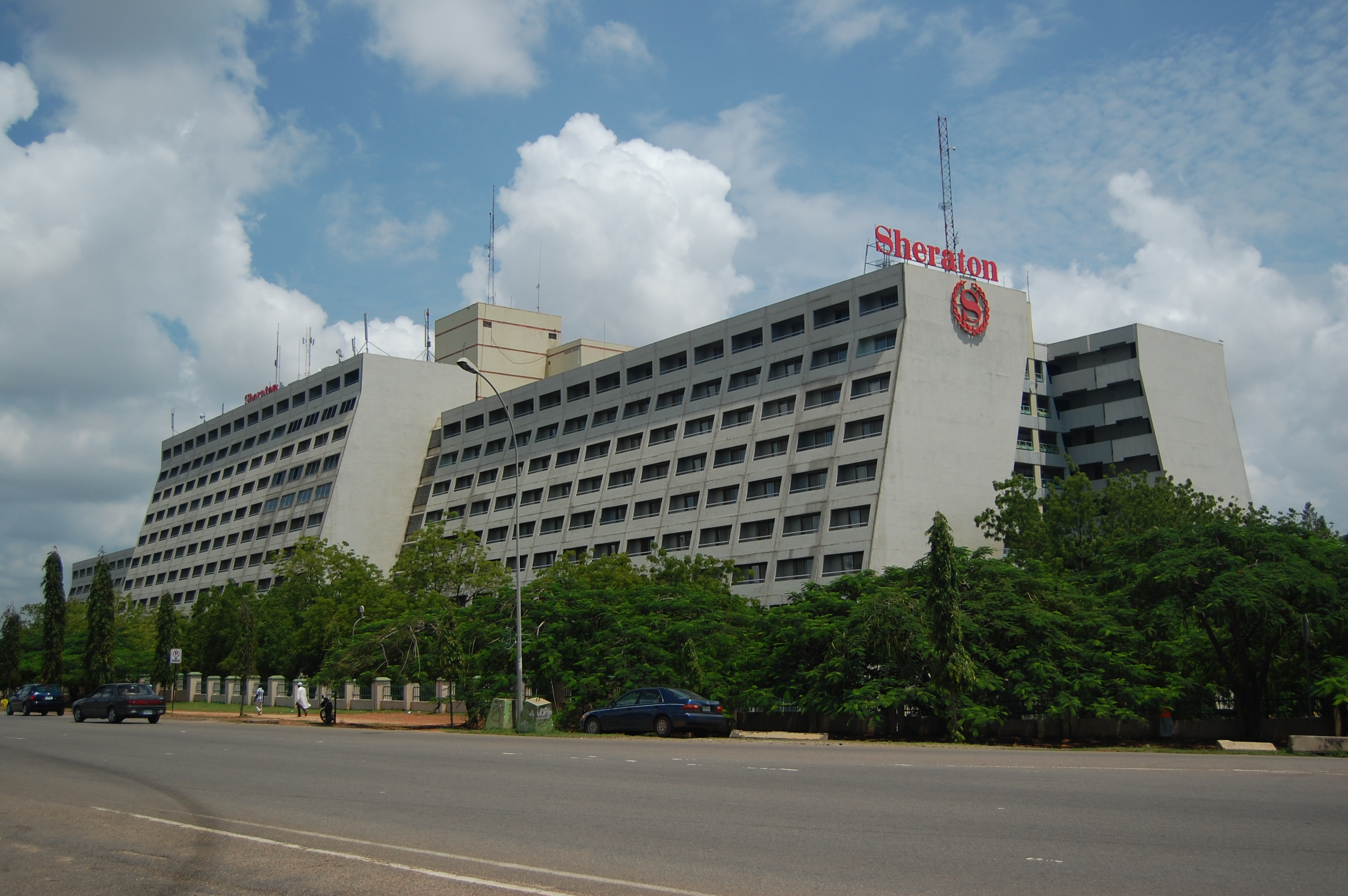
Sheraton, Abuja

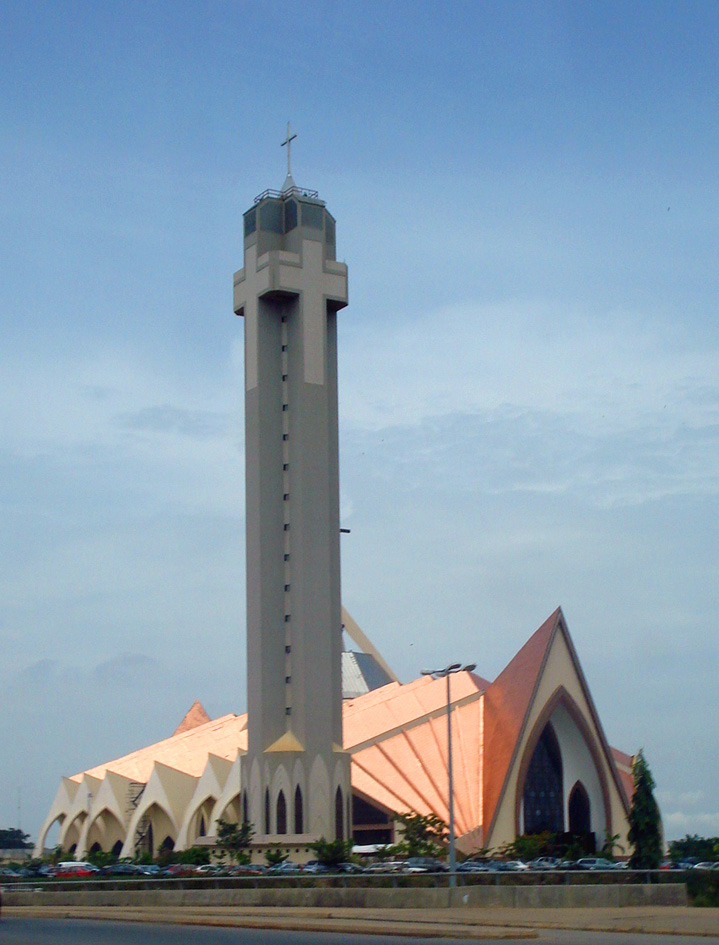
National Christian Centre

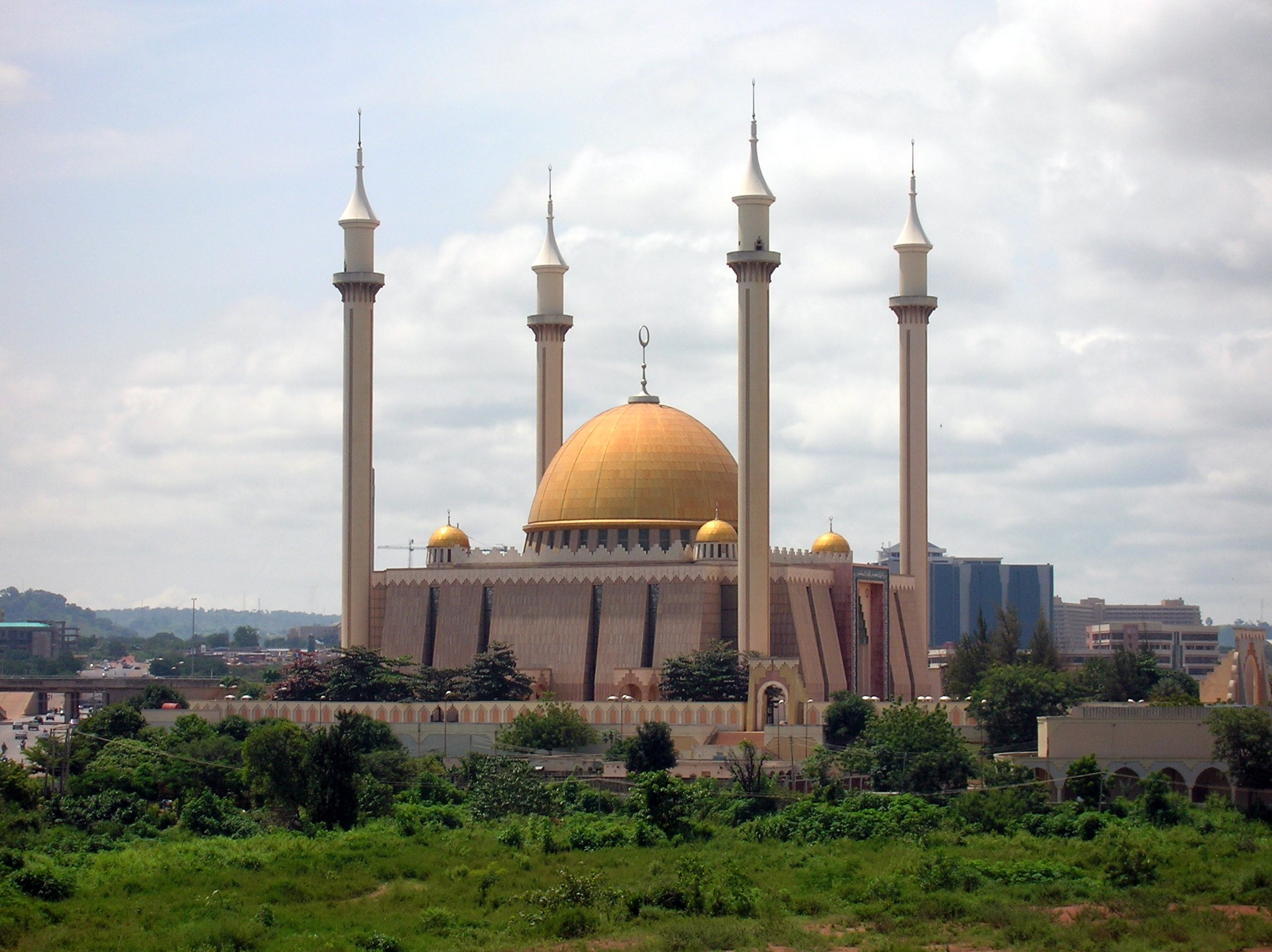
Abuja National Mosque

For ease and co-ordination of developmental efforts, the city was divided into 'Phases' by its planners, with the city's development taking a concentric form with Phase 1, which consists of the city's inner districts-Central Area, Maitama, Asokoro, Wuse, Wuse II, Garki, Garki II, Guzape and Guzape II-at its core spreading out from the foot of Aso Rock, while Phase 5, consisting of the newly created Kyami District covering the vicinity of the Nnamdi Azikiwe International Airport and the permanent campus of the University of Abuja, over 40 kilometres west of Aso Rock. Each Phase is separated from the other by an expressway (some still under construction); for example, Phases 1 and 2 are separated from each other by the Nnamdi Azikiwe expressway, while the entirety of the city proper (Phases 1–5) is enclosed by the Murtala Muhammed (Outer Northern-ONEX and Outer Southern-OSEX) expressways as well as the Federal A2 highway which traverses the Federal Capital Territory on its way to Kaduna (north-bound) and Lokoja (south-bound). Thus, there is an integration of the city's road network with the Federal highway network, providing access to the immediate outlying countryside and the surrounding states of the country i.e. Niger State to the west, Kaduna State to the north, Nasarawa State to the east and Kogi State to the south.

Abuja is organised into phases, which are further divided into districts.

==== Phase 1 ====
===== Asokoro District =====
Asokoro, the doyen of the districts, houses all of the state's lodges/guesthouses. The ECOWAS secretariat is a focal point of interest. Asokoro is to the east of the Garki District and south of the Central District. It is one of the most exclusive districts of Abuja and houses virtually all of the federal cabinet ministers as well as most of the diplomatic community in the city; in addition, the Presidential Palace (commonly referred to as Aso Rock) is in Asokoro District. By virtue of this fact, Asokoro is the most secure area of the city.

===== Central Business District =====
Abuja's Central District, also called Central Area, is a strip of land stretching from Aso Rock in the east to the National Stadium and the Old City gate in the West. It is like the city's spinal cord, dividing it into the northern sector with Maitama and Wuse, and the southern sector with Garki and Asokoro. While each district has its own demarcated commercial and residential sectors, the Central District is the city's principal Business Zone, where practically all parastatals and multinational corporations have their offices. An attractive area in the Central District is the Three Arms Zone, so-called because it houses the administrative offices of the executive, legislative, and judicial arms of the federal government. A few of the other sites worth seeing in the area are the federal secretariats alongside Shehu Shagari Way, Aso Hill, the Abuja Plant Nursery, Eagle Square (which has important historic significance, as it was in this grounds that the present democratic dispensation had its origin on 29 May 1999) and in which all subsequent Presidential Inauguration ceremonies have taken place. The Tomb of the Unknown Soldier is situated across Shehu Shagari Way, facing Eagle Square. This section is usually closed to traffic during the annual Armed Forces Remembrance Day ceremonies, that is observed on 15 January. The National Mosque and National Christian Centre are opposite each other on either side of Independence Avenue. A well-known government office is the Ministry of Defense, colloquially nicknamed "Ship House". Also located here is the yet-to-be-completed National Square, Millennium Tower and Nigeria Cultural Centre multi-functional complex.

===== Garki District =====
The Garki District is the area in the southwest corner of the city, having the Central District to the north and the Asokoro District to the east. The district is subdivided into units called "areas". Garki uses a distinctive naming convention of "area" to refer to parts of Garki. These are designated as Areas 1 to 11. Garki II is used to differentiate the area from Garki Area 2. Visitors may find this system confusing.

Garki is presently the principal business and administrative district of Abuja. Numerous buildings of interest are in this area. Some of them include the General Post Office, Abuja International Conference Centre along the busy Herbert Macaulay Way, Nicon Luxury Hotel (formally known as Abuja Sofitel Hotel and Le Meridian), Agura Hotel and Old Federal Secretariat Complex Buildings (Area 1). A new five-star hotel, Hawthorn Suites Abuja, is in Garki.

Area 2 is mainly used for residential purposes, although a zoological garden, as well as a small shopping centre, are to be found here as well. Several banks and other commercial offices are located along Moshood Abiola Way in Area 7. The headquarters of the Nigerian Armed Forces – Army, Airforce and Navy – is located on Muhammadu Buhari Way in the Garki District.

The tallest building in this district is the Radio House located in the Area 11 sector, which houses the Federal Ministry of Information and Communications, the Federal Radio Corporation of Nigeria (FRCN) and Voice of Nigeria (VON). The Nigerian Television Authority (NTA) stations and corporate headquarters are also in Garki. The Federal Capital Development Authority (FCDA) which oversees and runs the Administration of the Federal Capital Territory has its offices in Garki.

The Office of the Minister of the Federal Capital Territory is in Area 11. This is the location of the Federal Capital Development Authority and other administrative buildings. A popular sub-neighbourhood here is found in the vicinity of Gimbiya Street because it has the unique characteristic of being a purely administrative zone on weekdays while transforming purely into an entertainment zone on weeknights and weekends.

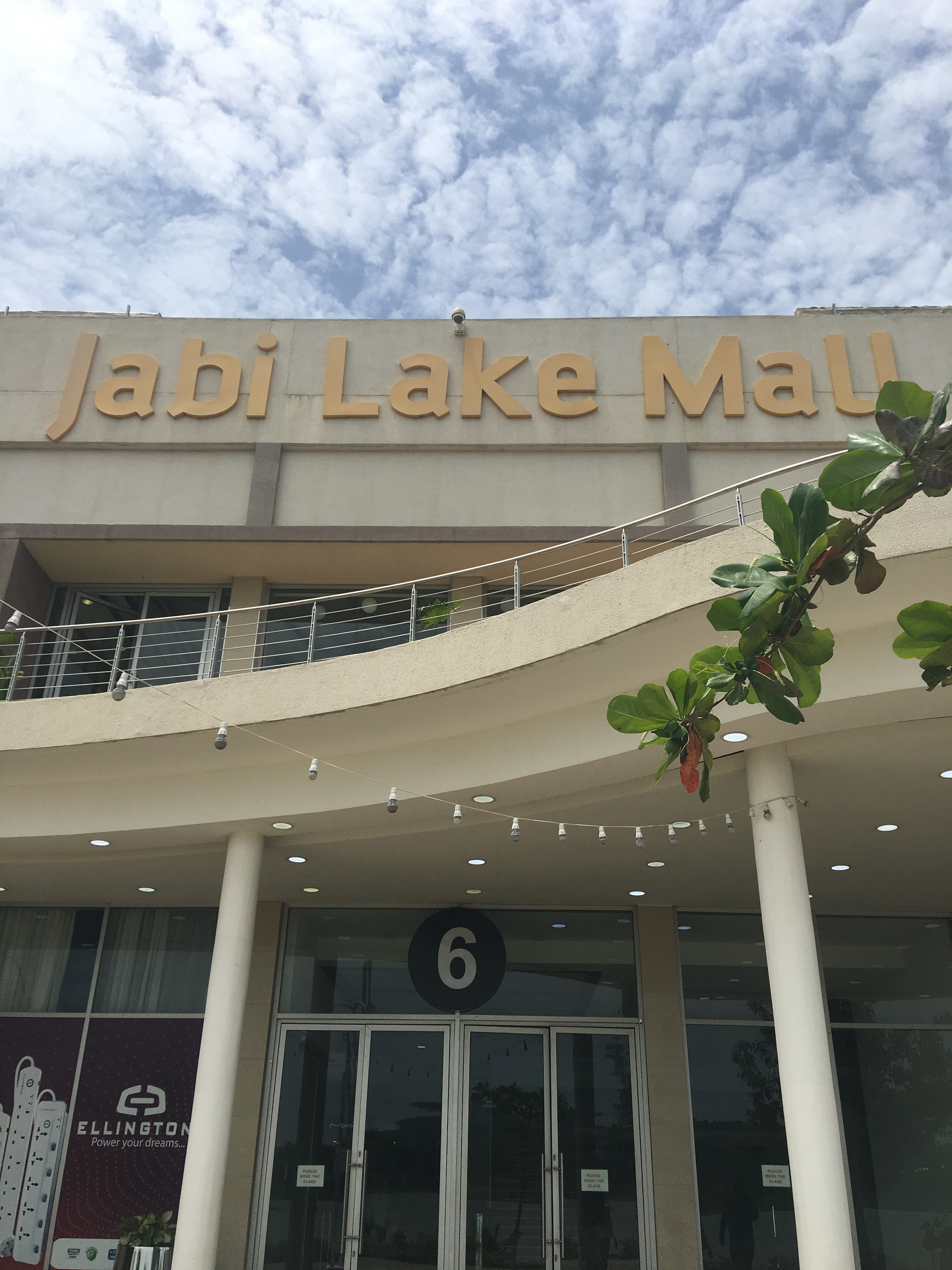
Jabi lake mall

Other places of note include the Cyprian Ekwensi Arts & Culture Centre and The Nigerian Police Mobile Force CID (Criminal Investigation Department) headquarters in Area 10. The Abuja Municipal Area Council, which is the local government administration has its headquarters in Area 10. The new United States Embassy is in the Diplomatic Zone which adjoins Garki.

===== Maitama District =====
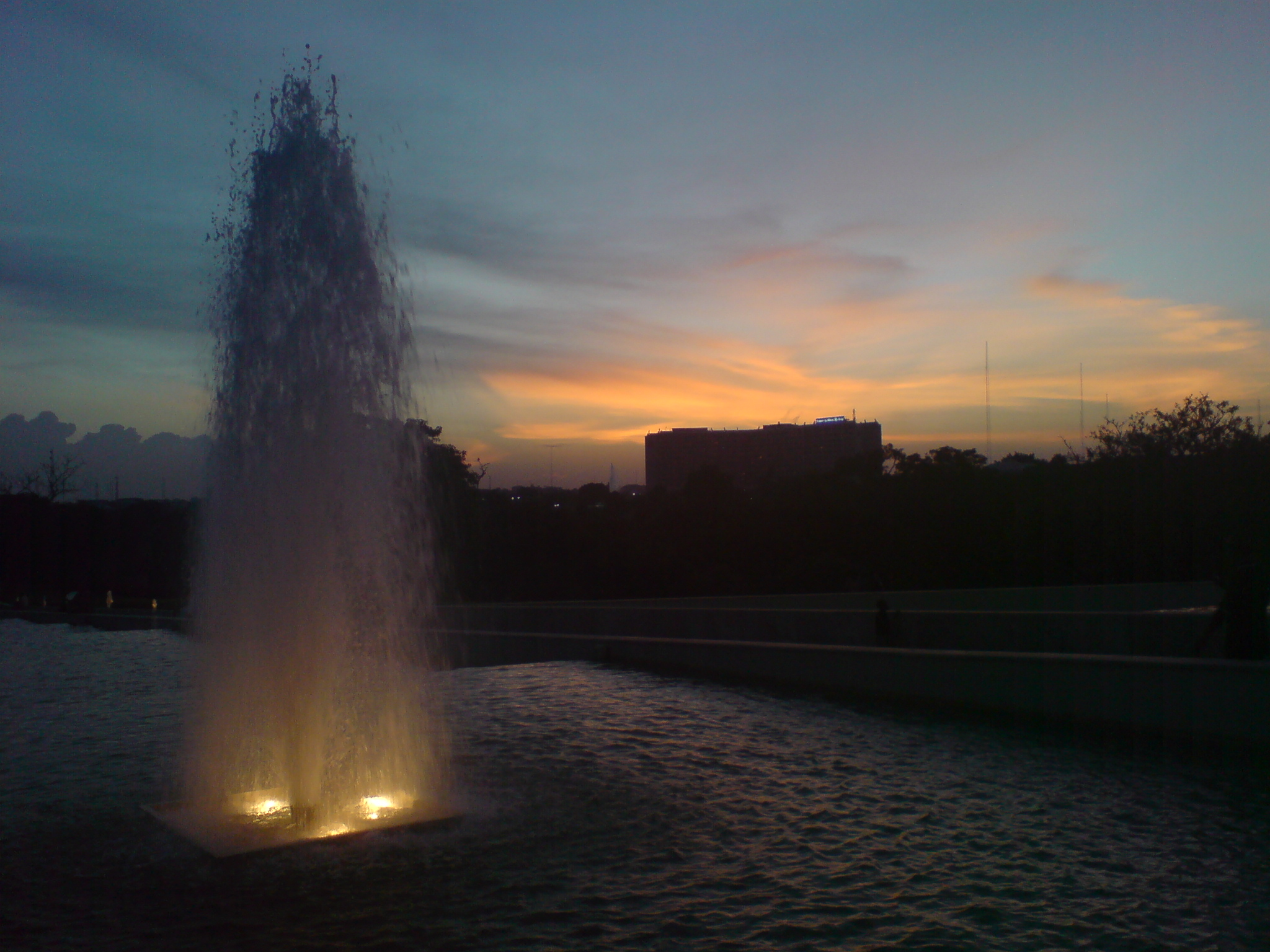
Millennium Park water fountain at night

Maitama District is to the north of the city, with the Wuse and Central Districts lying to its southwest and southeast, respectively. This area is home to the top-bracket sections of society and business and has the reputation of being very exclusive and very expensive. Interesting buildings include the Transcorp Hilton Abuja, Nigerian Communications Commission Headquarters (NCC), National Universities Commission (NUC), Soil Conservation Complex, and Independent National Electoral Commission (INEC). The British High Commission is located along Aguiyi Ironsi Way, in Maitama.

Also, the Maitama District Hospital is another notable building in Maitama. Maitama District is home to many of the European and Asian embassies.

====== Maitama II ======
Maitama II District Cadastral Zone A10 is a new district created by the FCT administration of Muhammed Bello in 2018. Maitama 2 as it is unofficially called was created from Mpape Hills, a suburb bordering the Bwari and Maitama Districts of the FCT. Maitama II has a high net worth of individuals especially legislators as allottees, which makes it a destination for real estate investors who desire to secure the future today.

It is not very clear what the government plans for the district as not much has been said by government agents, but cadastral zoning A indicates the government has good plans for Maitama 2 to correct some errors in Maitama District.

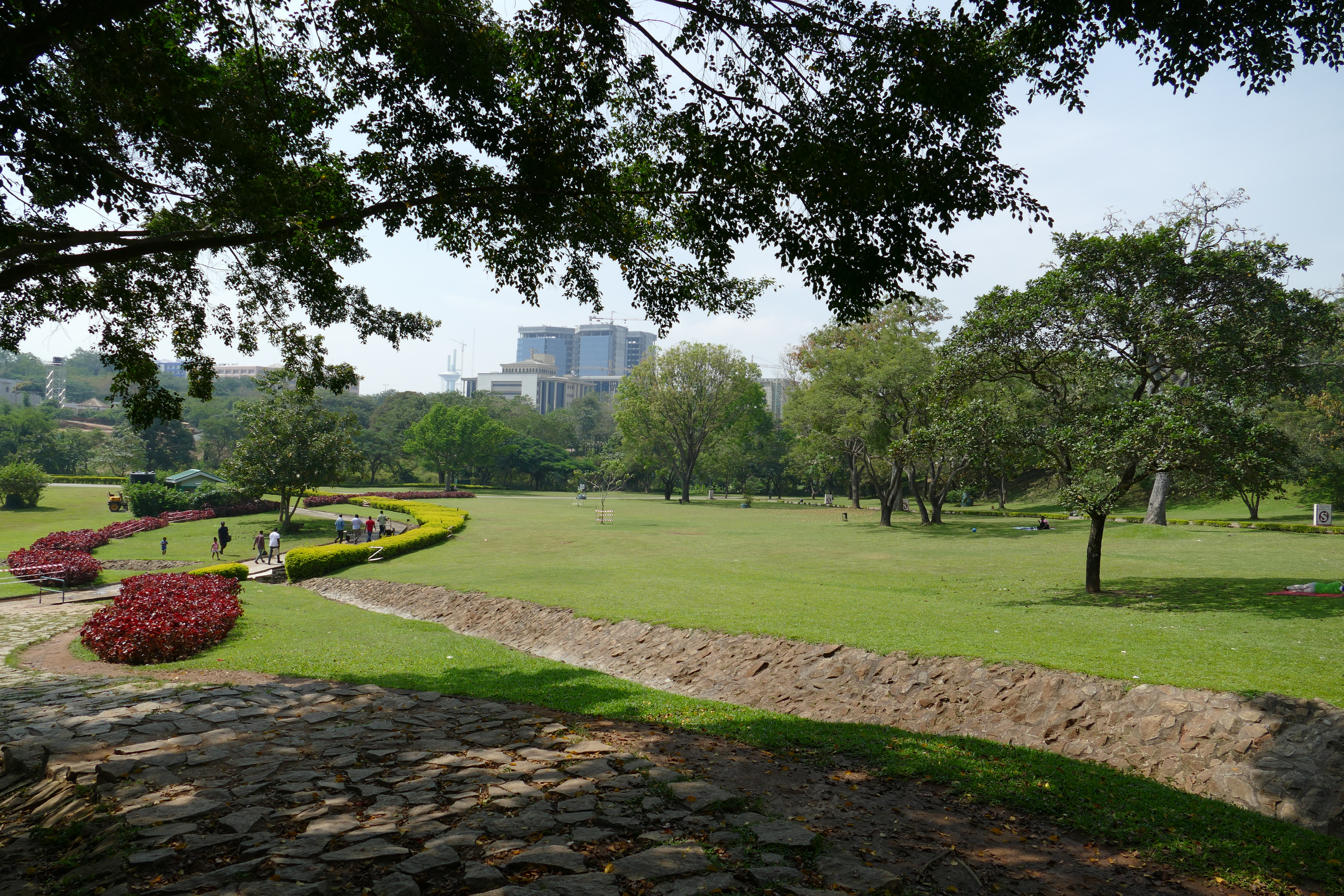
Millennium Park in Maitama District

It was learned that plots of land were revoked from allottees of Mpape district to create the new Maitama II District, although a compensation plan is underway to relocate the revoked allottees to another district the government intends to create. Fortunately, some developers of the Mpape district who have building plan approval and have started building maintain their plots and allocations and are covered in the Maitama II District layout. It is not clear though if a fresh allocation bearing Maitama II District has been issued to this set of allottees.

Notable landmarks of the Maitama 2 district are Jubilation Avenue, Mount Pleasant Haven and Hilltop Estate.

The district infrastructure is in top gear as the Federal Government had in the 2018 and 2019 budgets allocated about N1.3b for the engineering design of the district. Villages around the district are living in fear of demolition at any time with the information reaching them that government will commence the infrastructure project of Maitama II District.

===== Wuse District =====
Wuse District is the northwestern part of the city, with the Maitama District to its north and the Central District to its south. The District is numbered Zones 1–6. The Wuse Market is Abuja's principal market. The second most important post office in the city is here. This district houses the Sheraton Hotel and Towers (Zone 4), Grand Ibro International Hotel, the Federal Road Safety Corps Headquarters (Zone 3), Nigerian Customs Services Headquarters, Federal Civil Service Commission (Zone 3), National Agency for Food and Drugs Administration (NAFDAC) (Zone 7), Wuse General Hospital, and the Nigerian Tourism Development Corporation. Just as Garki District has Garki II, Wuse has Wuse II. This is distinct from Wuse Zone 2. Like other inner Abuja districts such as Asokoro or Garki, there are very few large housing estates. Instead, office buildings, mansions and apartment blocks are prominent features of the area.

==== Phase 2 ====
- Apo-Dutse
- Dakibiyu
- Duboyi
- Durumi
- Gaduwa
- Gudu
- Jabi
- Jahi
- Kado
- Katampe
- Kaura
- Kukwuaba
- Mabushi
- Utako
- Wuye
- Durumi 3
- Karmajiji

==== Phase 3 ====
- Galadimawa
- Gwarimpa
- Industrial Area 1 & Extension District
- Kabusa
- Karmo
- Kafe
- Life Camp
- Nbora
- Dakwo
- Lokogoma

==== Phase 4 ====
- Idu
- Karsana

There are five suburban districts: Nyanya, Karu, Gwagwalada, Kubwa and Jikwoyi. Along the Airport Road (Now Umaru Musa Yar'Adua Express Way) are clusters of satellite settlements, namely Lugbe, Chika, Kuchigworo and Pyakassa. Other satellite settlements are Idu (the main industrial zone), Mpape, Karimu, Gwagwa, Dei-Dei (housing the International Livestock market and also International Building materials market).

== Cityscape ==
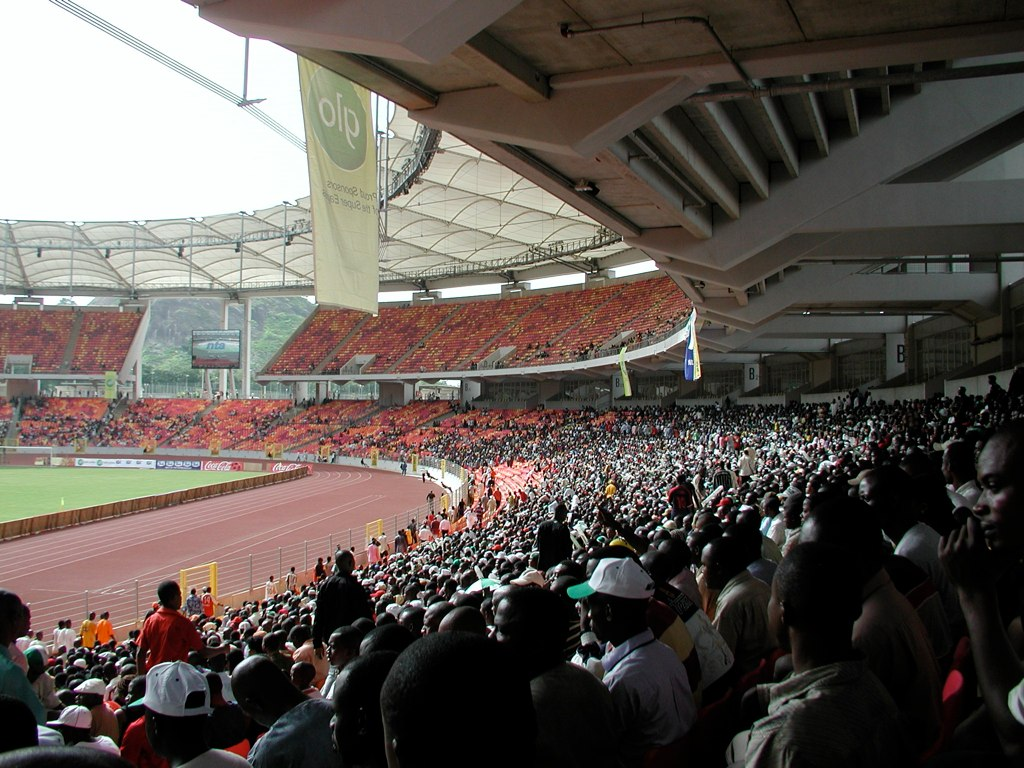
Spectators at a football match held at the Abuja National Stadium

Construction of the Millennium Tower started in 2005 and was halted in 2017 after funds ran out. This structure looms 170 metres (560 ft) above the city and is the tallest artificial structure in Abuja. The tower is part of a huge cultural development complex called the Nigeria National Complex including the Nigeria Cultural Centre, a 120,000 m^{2} (1,300,000 sq ft) structure dedicated to the art and culture of Nigeria. The Cultural Centre and the Millennium Tower have been designed by the Italian architect Manfredi Nicoletti.

Landmarks include the Millennium Tower, the Central Bank of Nigeria headquarters, the Nigerian Presidential Complex, the Ship House, the National Stadium, which was the main venue of the 2003 All Africa Games and some games, including the final, of the 2009 FIFA Under-17 World Cup, National Mosque, the National Church, Aso Rock and Zuma Rock.

=== Parks and open areas ===
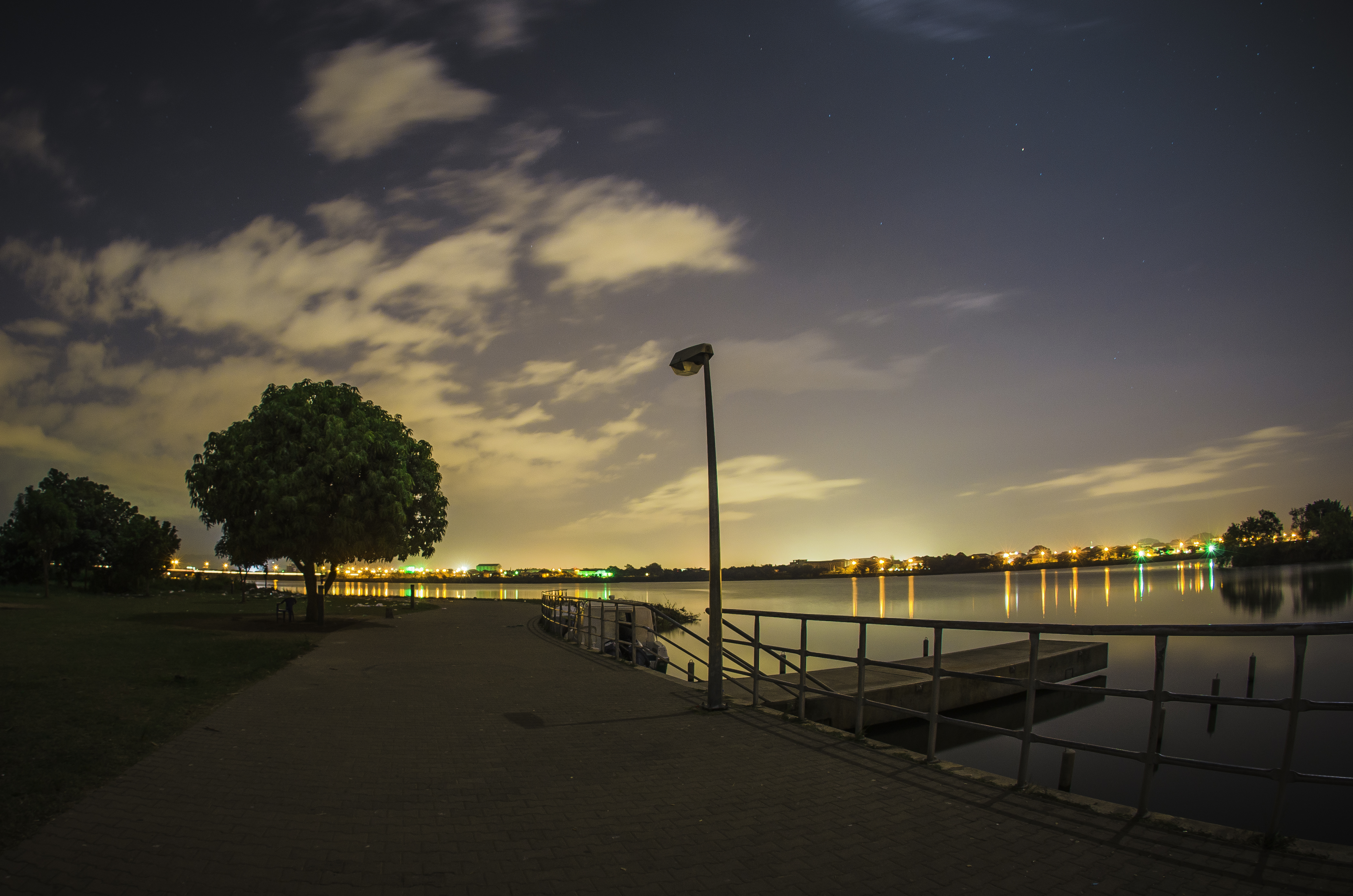
Jabi lake

Abuja is home to several parks and green areas, with the largest one being Millennium Park. Millennium Park was designed by architect Manfredi Nicoletti and was officially opened by the United Kingdom's Queen Elizabeth II (the former Queen of Nigeria) in December 2003. Another open area park is located in Lifecamp Gwarimpa; near the residence of the Minister of the Federal Capital Territory. The park is located on a slightly raised hilltop which contains sports facilities like Basketball and Badminton courts another park is the city park, which is located in Wuse 2 and is home to numerous outdoor and indoor attractions such as a 4D cinema, Astro-turf, lawn tennis court, paintball arena and a variety of restaurants. The National Children's Park and Zoo host a number of animals and recreation spots.

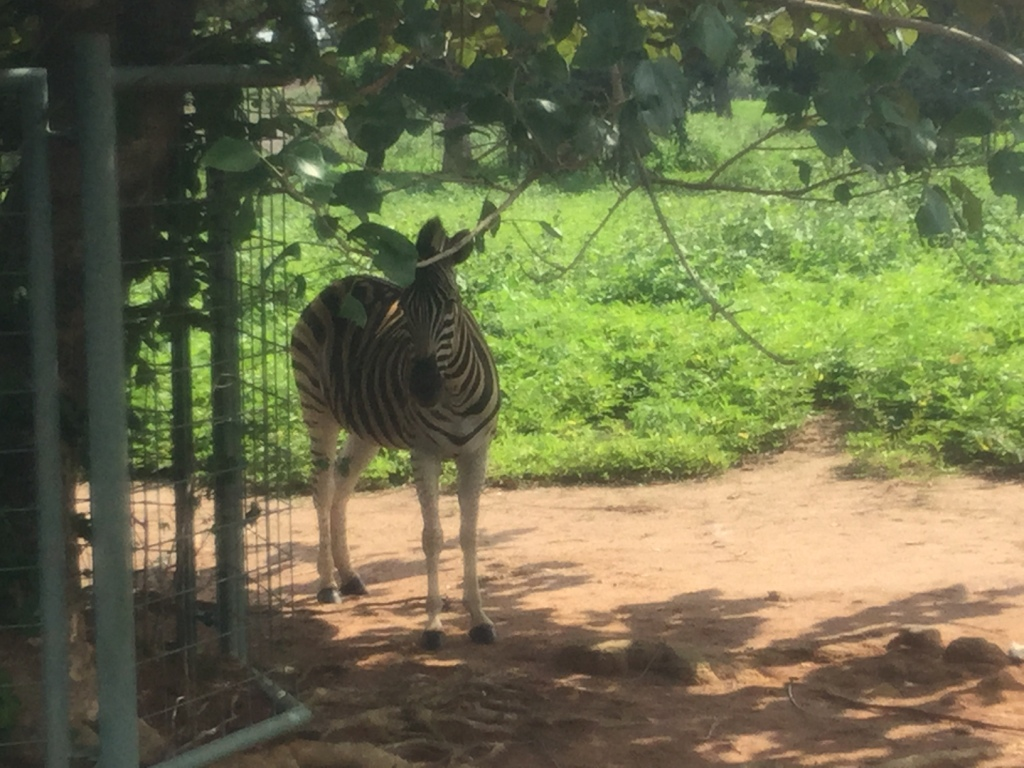
National Children's Park and Zoo

==== Bush bars ====
Abuja has a variety of informal spaces known as "bush bars" that usually include a covered area with tables and chairs where people can sit and have drinks (alcoholic and non-alcoholic). Some offer snacks such as suya, grilled catfish, pounded yam, egusi soup and other small items for purchase. They are located all over Abuja.

== Geography ==
The elevation is 360 metres (1,180 ft).

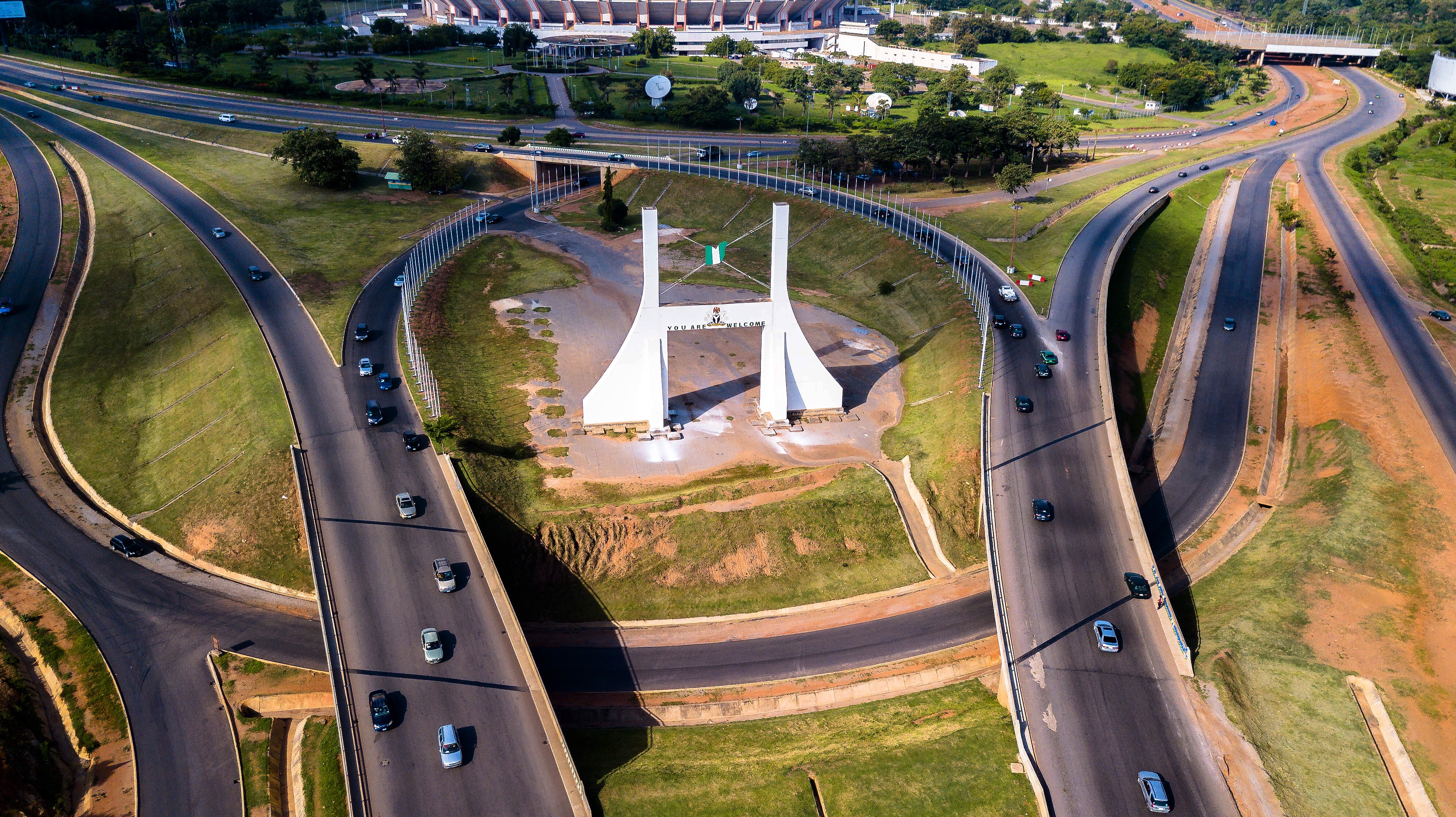
Abuja, Nigeria

=== Climate ===
Abuja under Köppen climate classification features a tropical wet and dry climate (Köppen: Aw). The FCT experiences three weather conditions annually. This includes a warm, humid rainy season and a blistering dry season. In between the two, there is a brief interlude of harmattan occasioned by the northeast trade wind, with the main feature of dust haze and cloudless skies.

The rainy season begins from April and ends in October, when daytime temperatures reach 28 °C (82.4 °F) to 30 °C (86.0 °F) and nighttime lows hover around 22 °C (71.6 °F) to 23 °C (73.4 °F). In the dry season, daytime temperatures can soar as high as 40 °C (104.0 °F) and overnight temperatures can dip to 20 °C (68.0 °F). Even the coolest nights can be followed by daytime temperatures well above 30 °C (86.0 °F). The medium altitude and undulating terrain of the FCT act as a moderating influence on the weather of the territory. The city's inland location causes the diurnal temperature variation to be much larger than coastal cities with similar climates such as Lagos.

Rainfall in the FCT reflects the territory's location on the windward side of the Jos Plateau and the zone of rising air masses with the city receiving frequent rainfall during the rainy season from April to October every year.

The effects of climate change have been observed in Abuja, according to a study conducted by the Nigerian Meteorological Agency and Atmospheric Science Group of Imo State University. Between 1993 and 2013, the average maximum temperature trended downward, but the average minimum and mean temperatures trended upwards. There was a downward trend for rainfall in Abuja, based on data collected between 1986 and 2016. The drought occurrence probability for Abuja increased by 15.4% between 1975 and 2014.

Climate data for Abuja, Nigeria (1991-2020)
Month	Jan	Feb	Mar	Apr	May	Jun	Jul	Aug	Sep	Oct	Nov	Dec	Year
Record high °C (°F)	40.0 (104.0)	42.0 (107.6)	42.0 (107.6)	41.0 (105.8)	39.7 (103.5)	37.8 (100.0)	34.7 (94.5)	33.5 (92.3)	34.0 (93.2)	40.0 (104.0)	38.1 (100.6)	39.0 (102.2)	42.0 (107.6)
Mean daily maximum °C (°F)	35.2 (95.4)	36.9 (98.4)	37.3 (99.1)	35.6 (96.1)	32.9 (91.2)	30.8 (87.4)	29.5 (85.1)	28.7 (83.7)	29.9 (85.8)	31.3 (88.3)	34.2 (93.6)	35.0 (95.0)	33.1 (91.6)
Daily mean °C (°F)	26.9 (80.4)	29.3 (84.7)	30.7 (87.3)	30.0 (86.0)	28.1 (82.6)	26.6 (79.9)	25.7 (78.3)	25.2 (77.4)	25.7 (78.3)	26.5 (79.7)	26.9 (80.4)	26.3 (79.3)	27.3 (81.1)
Mean daily minimum °C (°F)	18.5 (65.3)	21.6 (70.9)	24.1 (75.4)	24.4 (75.9)	23.3 (73.9)	22.3 (72.1)	22.0 (71.6)	21.8 (71.2)	21.6 (70.9)	21.6 (70.9)	19.7 (67.5)	17.7 (63.9)	21.5 (70.7)
Record low °C (°F)	11.0 (51.8)	13.7 (56.7)	15.0 (59.0)	14.0 (57.2)	15.0 (59.0)	17.2 (63.0)	16.0 (60.8)	15.0 (59.0)	18.0 (64.4)	16.5 (61.7)	13.0 (55.4)	8.9 (48.0)	8.9 (48.0)
Average precipitation mm (inches)	0.8 (0.03)	5.9 (0.23)	22.4 (0.88)	72.8 (2.87)	156.7 (6.17)	194.4 (7.65)	249.8 (9.83)	308.3 (12.14)	229.4 (9.03)	169.5 (6.67)	9.7 (0.38)	1.3 (0.05)	1,421.1 (55.95)
Average precipitation days (≥ 1 mm)	0.1	0.4	1.9	6.0	11.3	12.2	15.0	17.3	16.0	13.0	0.9	0.0	94.0
Average relative humidity (%)	44.4	44.9	56.1	71.5	80.9	84.7	86.8	88.0	86.8	83.4	65.8	50.9	70.3
Mean monthly sunshine hours	277.9	260.6	283.7	257.3	233.2	184.2	175.7	154.0	188.9	241.1	275.0	278.0	2,809.6
Source 1: NOAA
Source 2: Weather.Directory

=== Vegetation ===
The FCT falls within the Guinean forest-savanna mosaic zone of the West African sub-region. Patches of rain forest, however, occur in the Gwagwa plains, especially in the rugged terrain to the southeastern parts of the territory, where a landscape of gullies and rough terrain is found. These areas of the Federal Capital Territory (FCT) form one of the few surviving occurrences of the mature forest vegetation in Nigeria.

=== Gallery ===
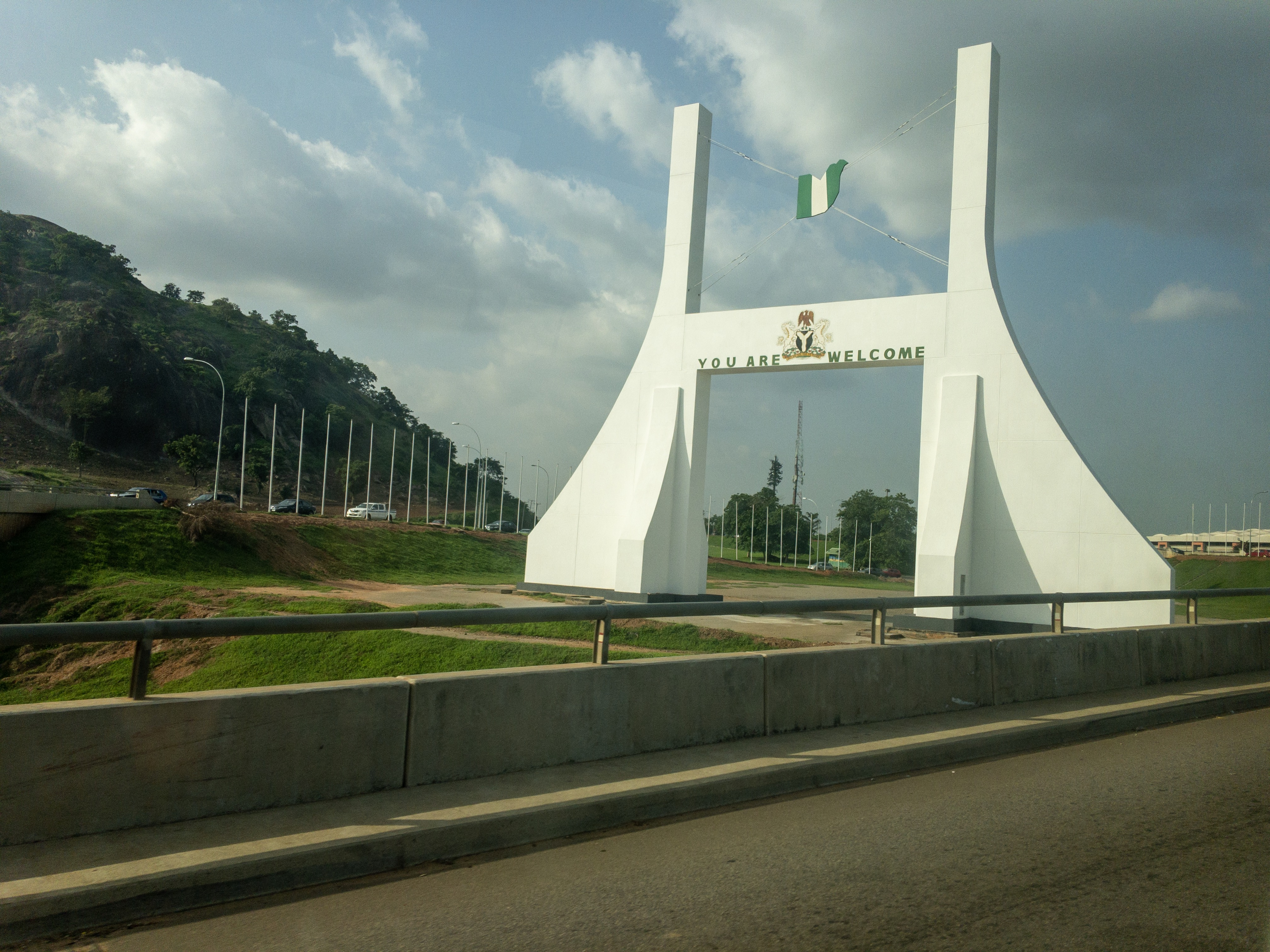
Abuja City Gate

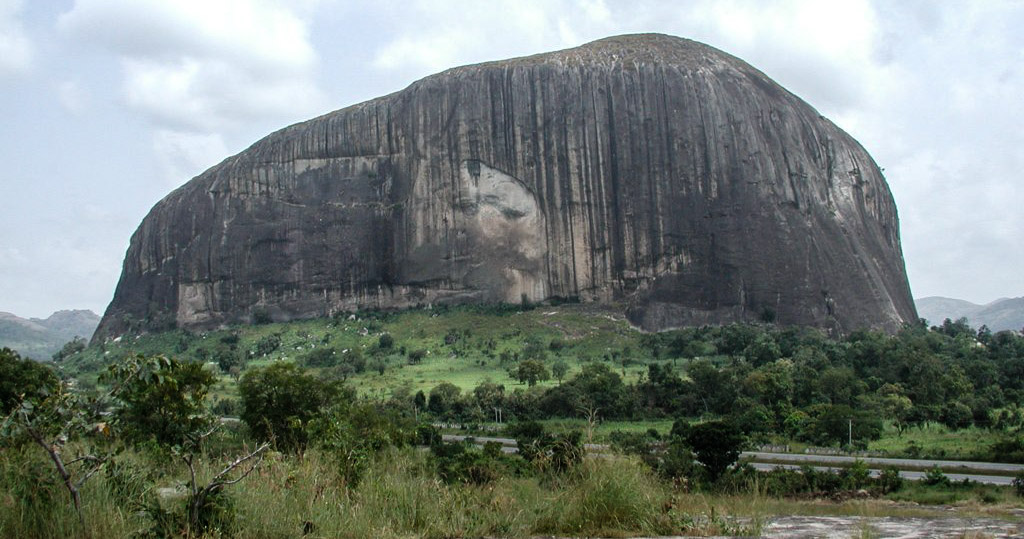
Zuma rock

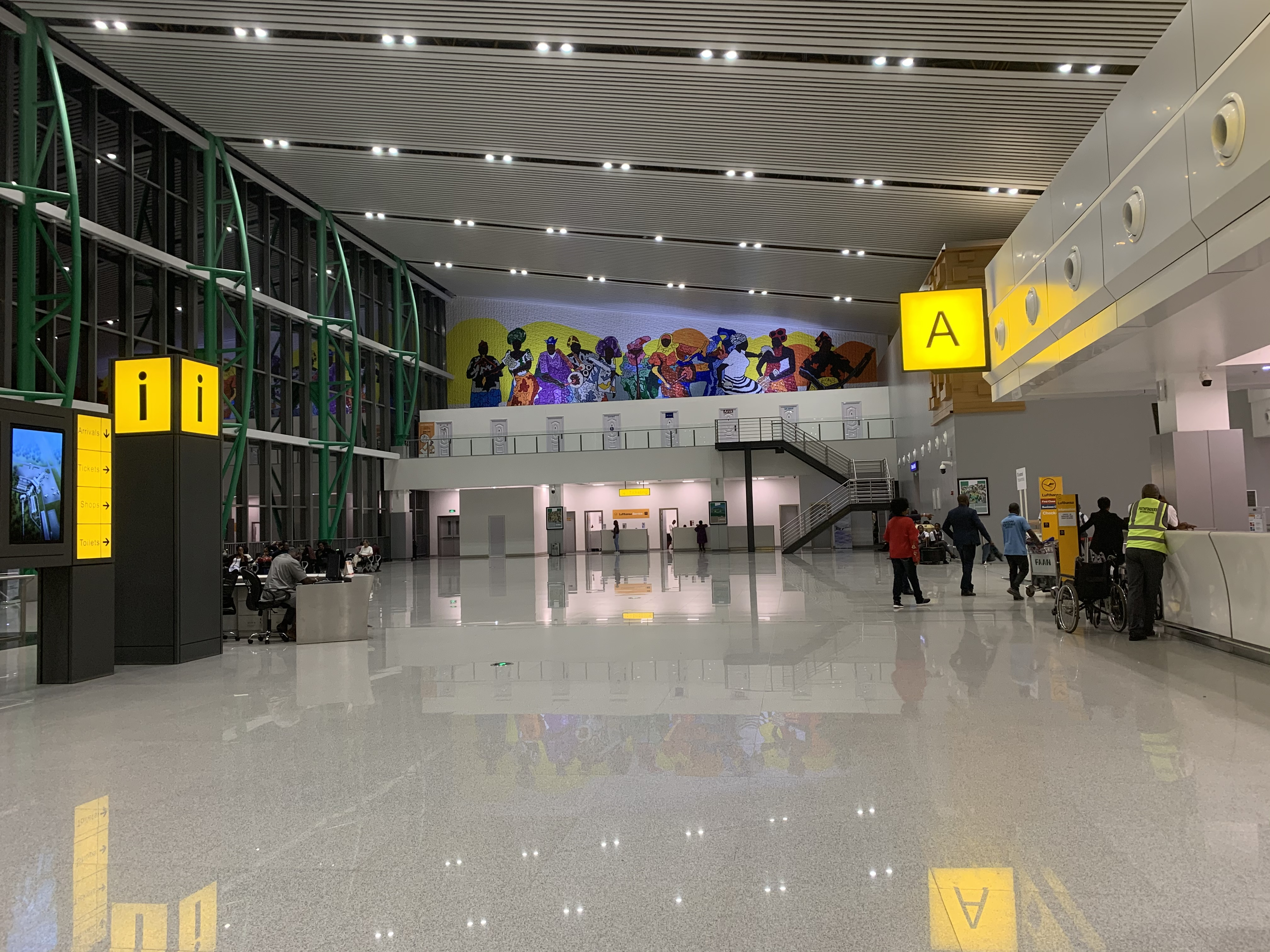
Terminal at the Abuja International Airport

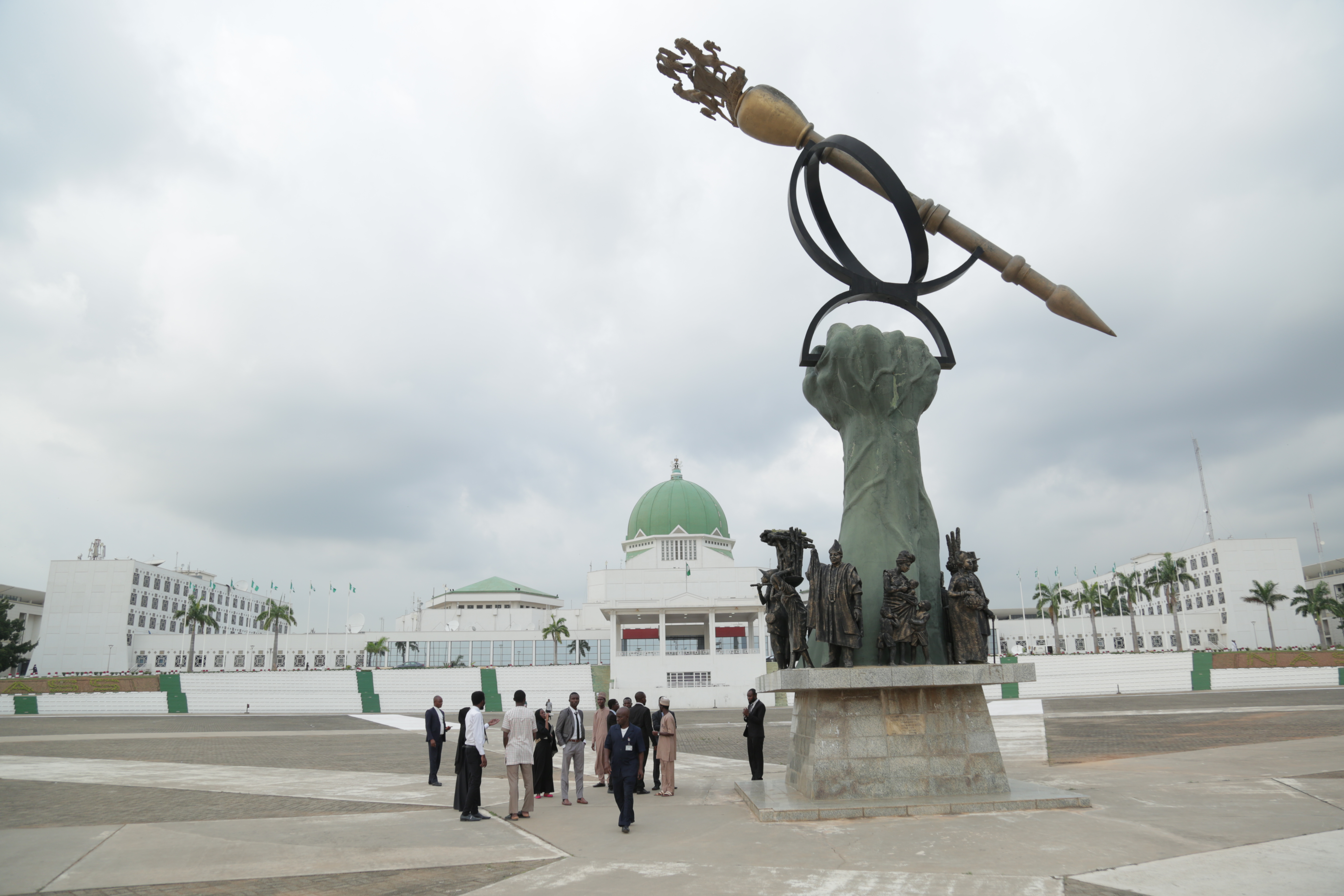
Nigeria's National Assembly building with the Mace

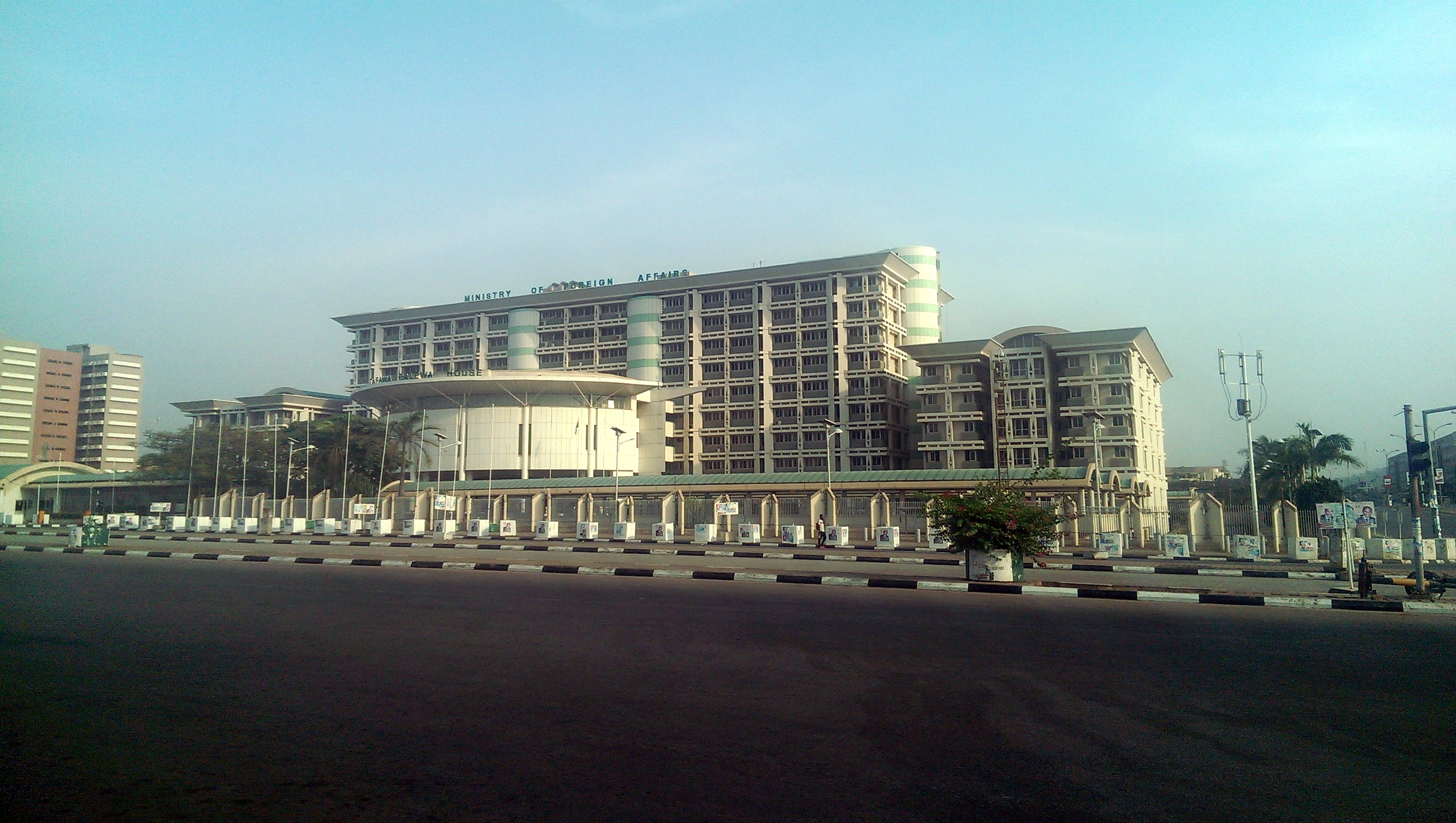
The Ministry of Foreign Affairs

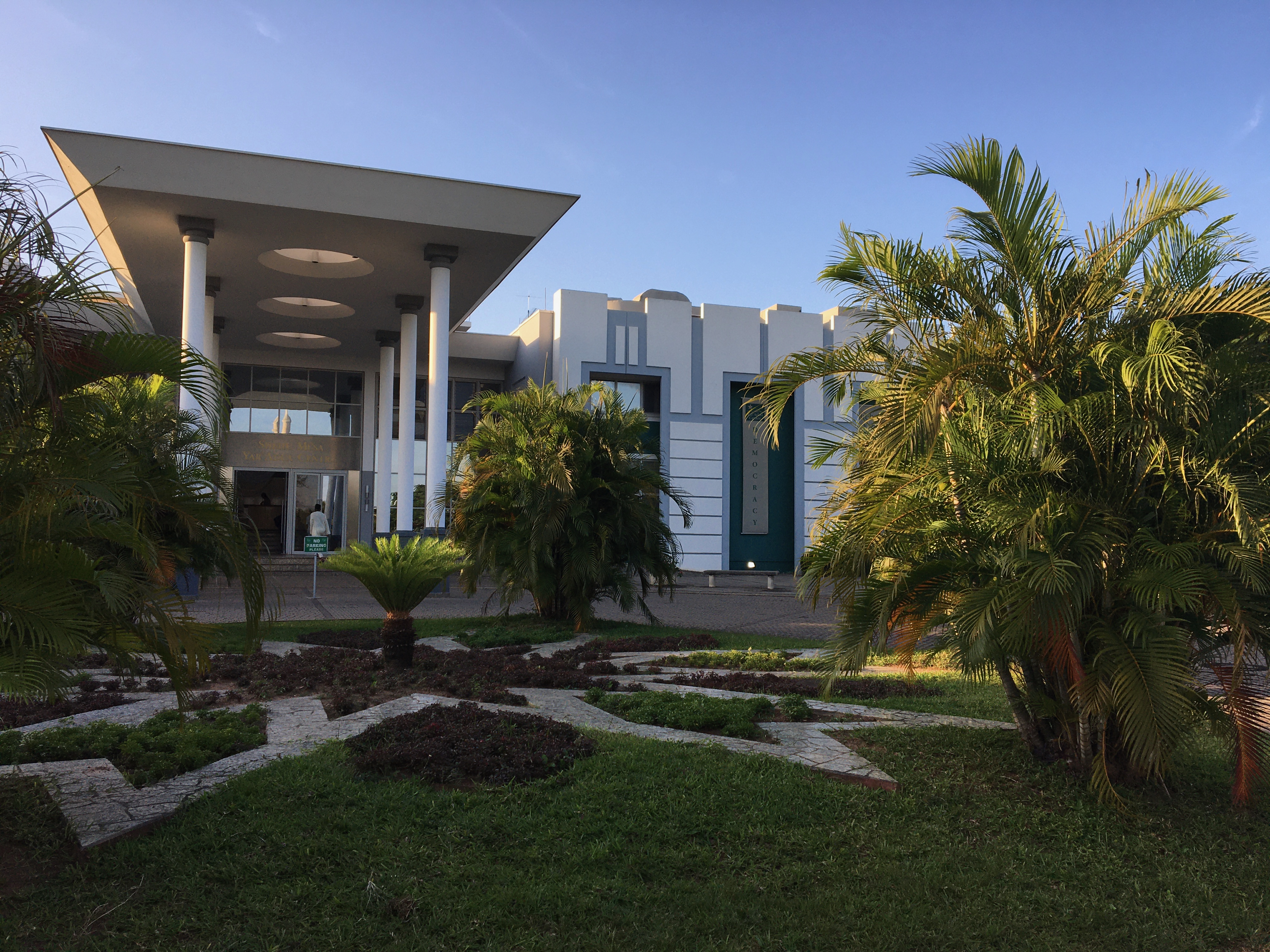
Shehu Musa Yar'adua Center

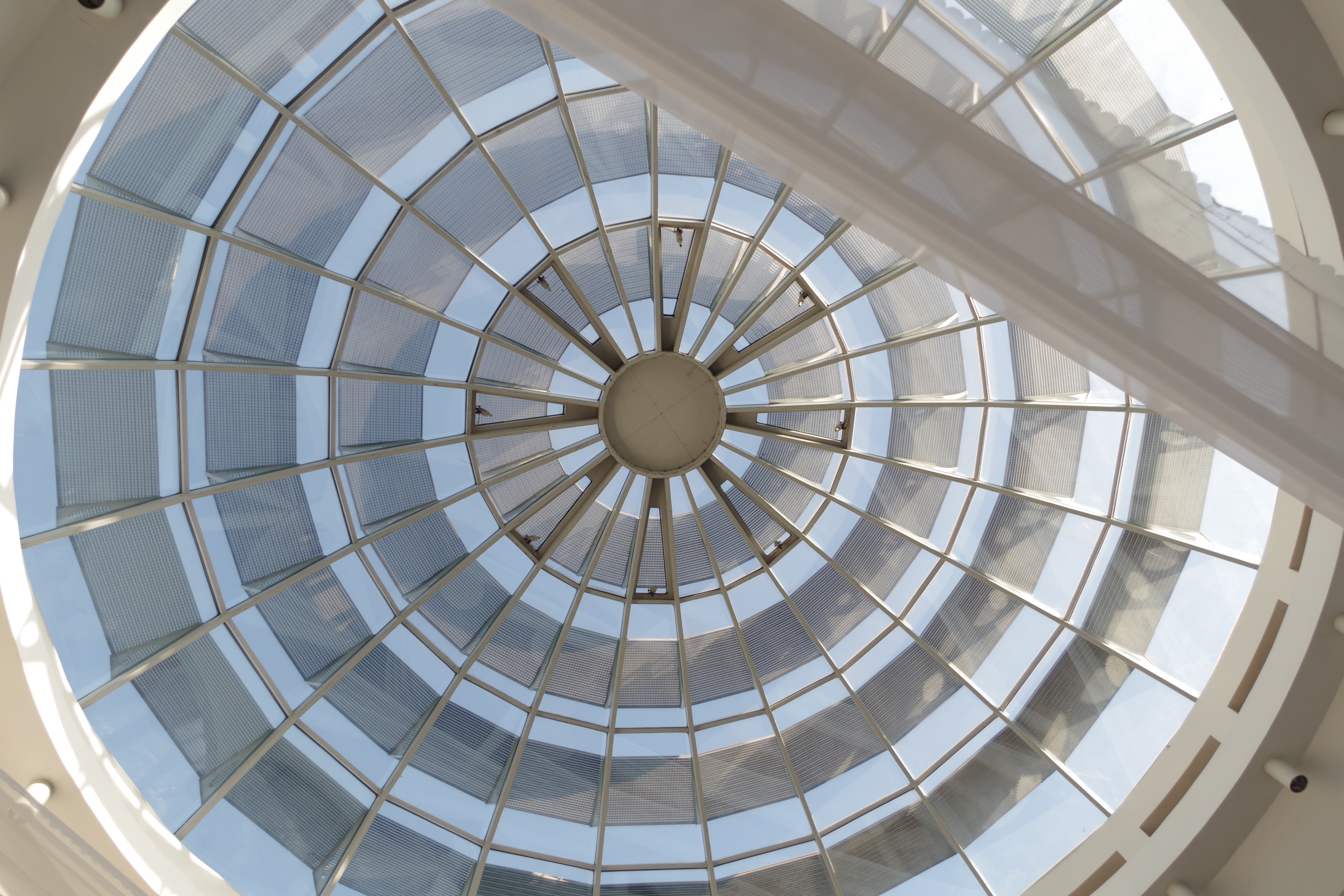
Glass dome of Shehu Musa Yar'adua Centre in Abuja

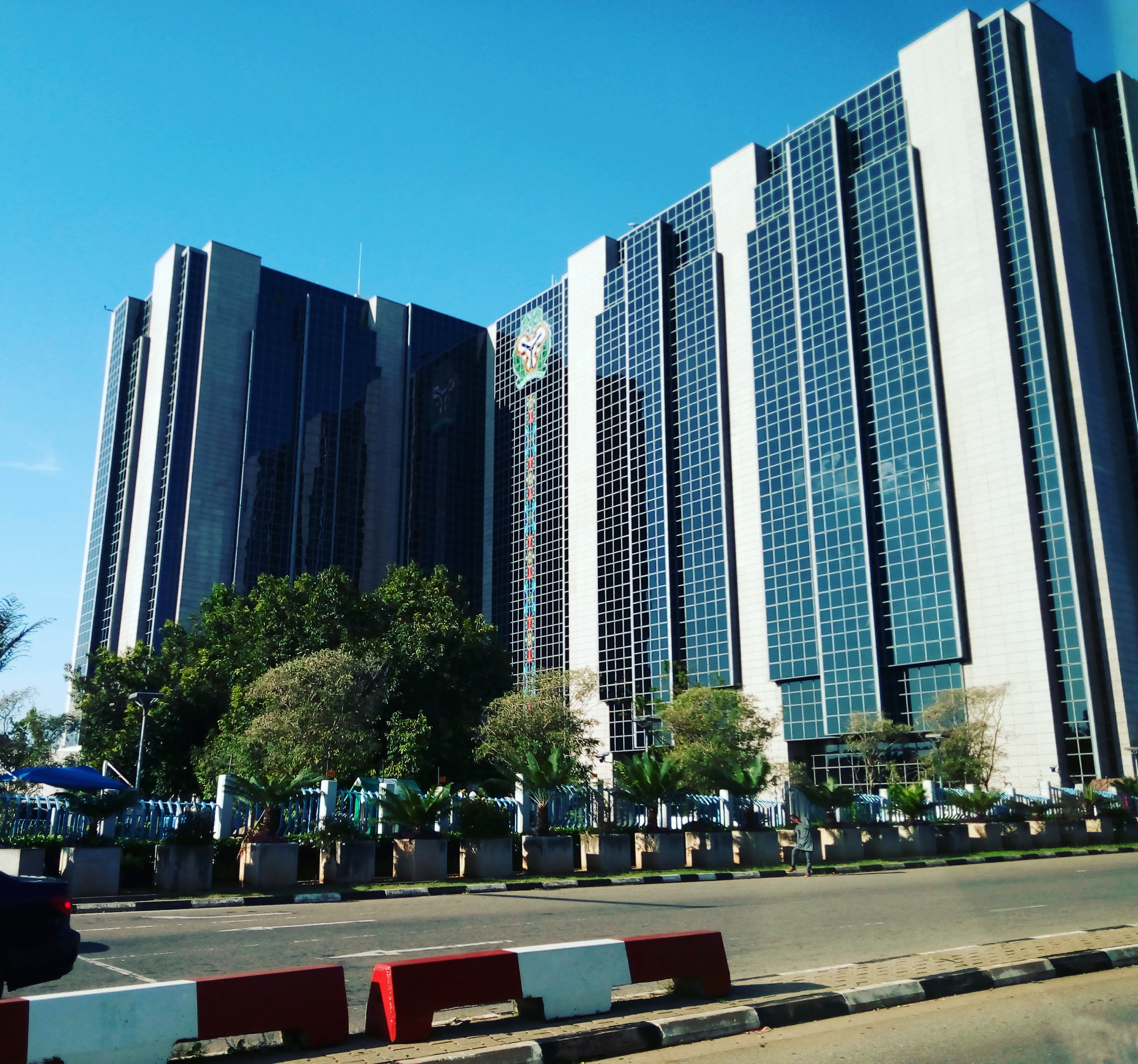
Side view of Central Bank of Nigeria, Abuja

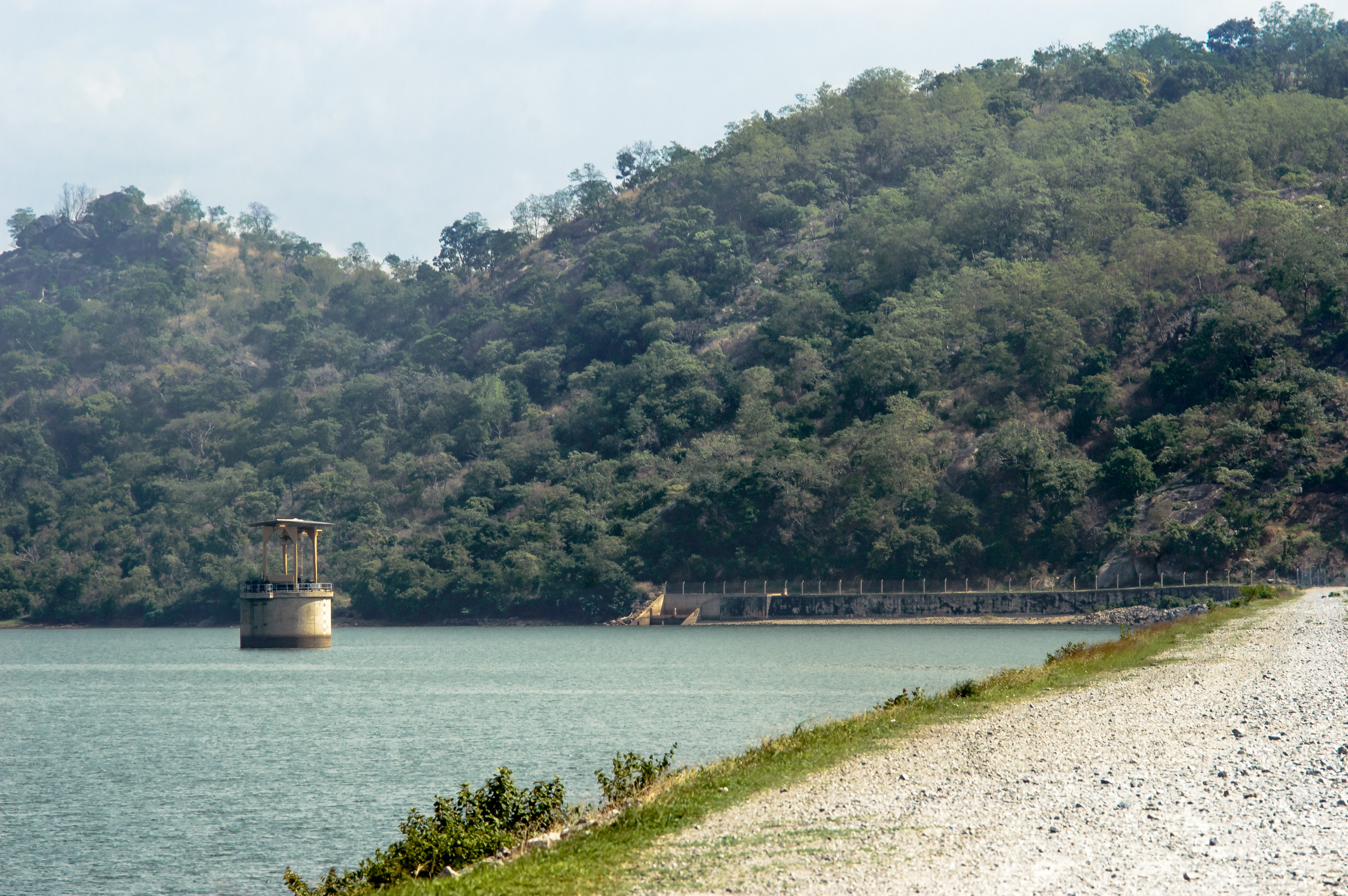
Usman Dam, Bwari Abuja

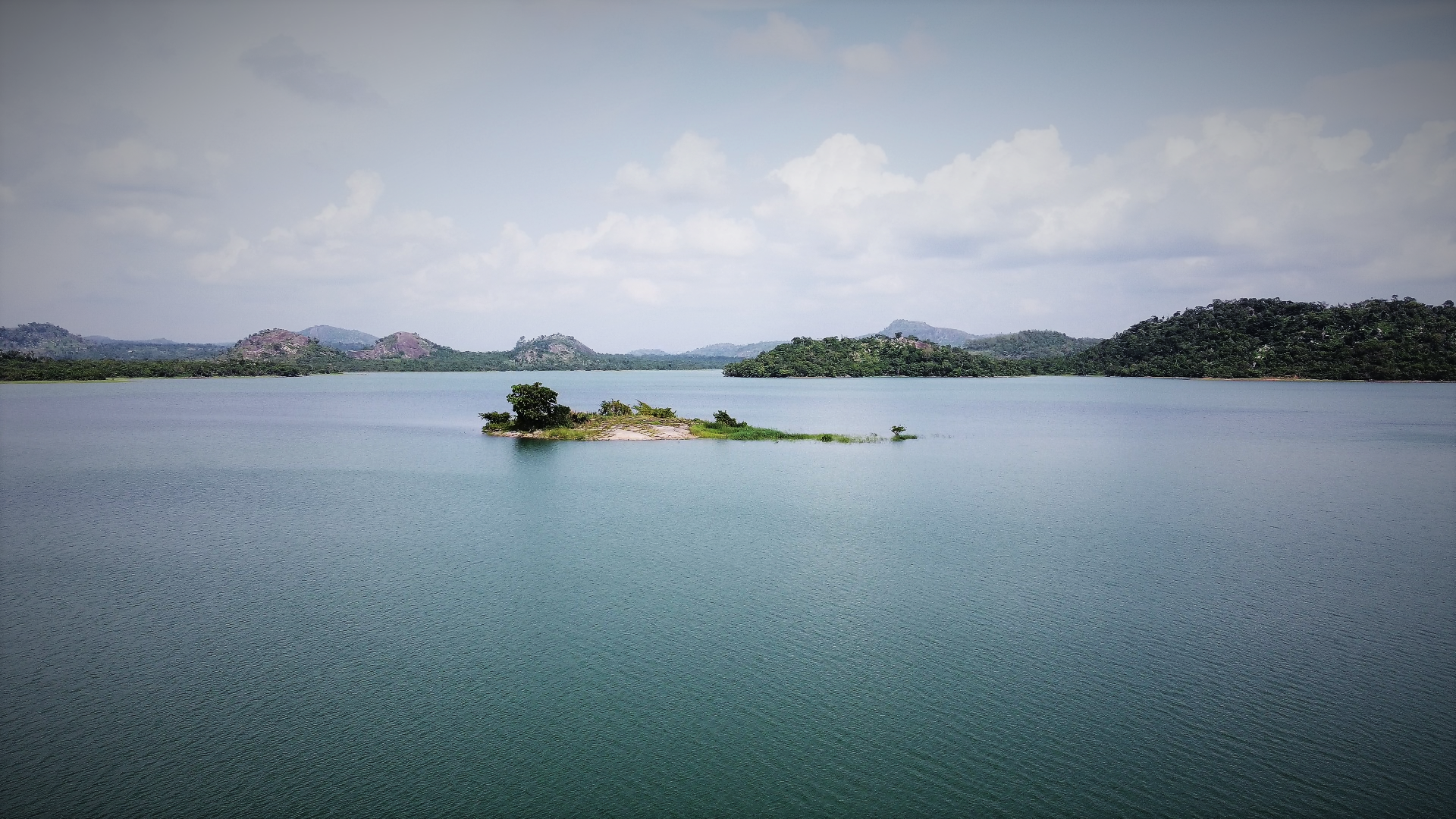
Usuma Dam Abuja

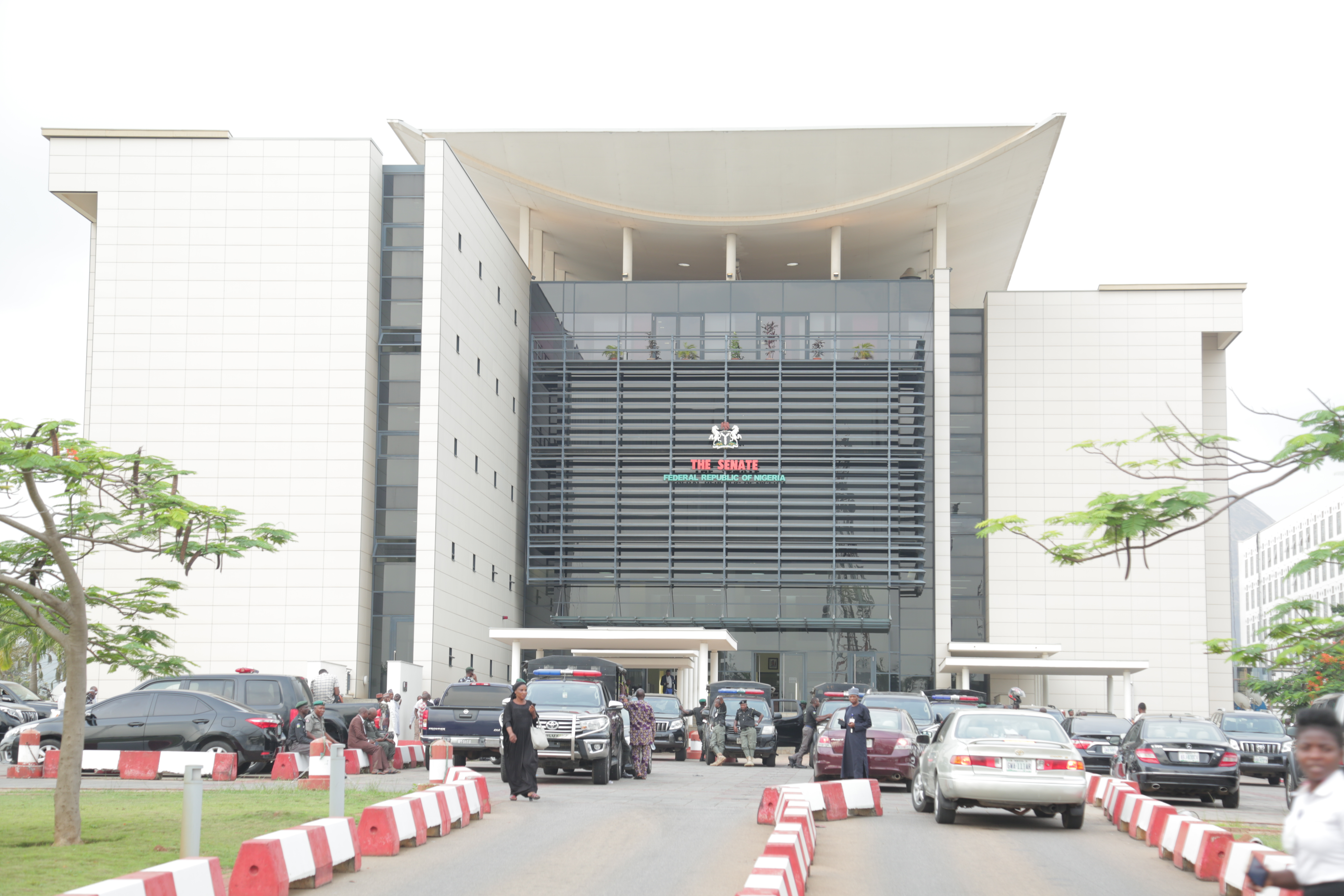
Nigeria Senate Building (Red Chamber)

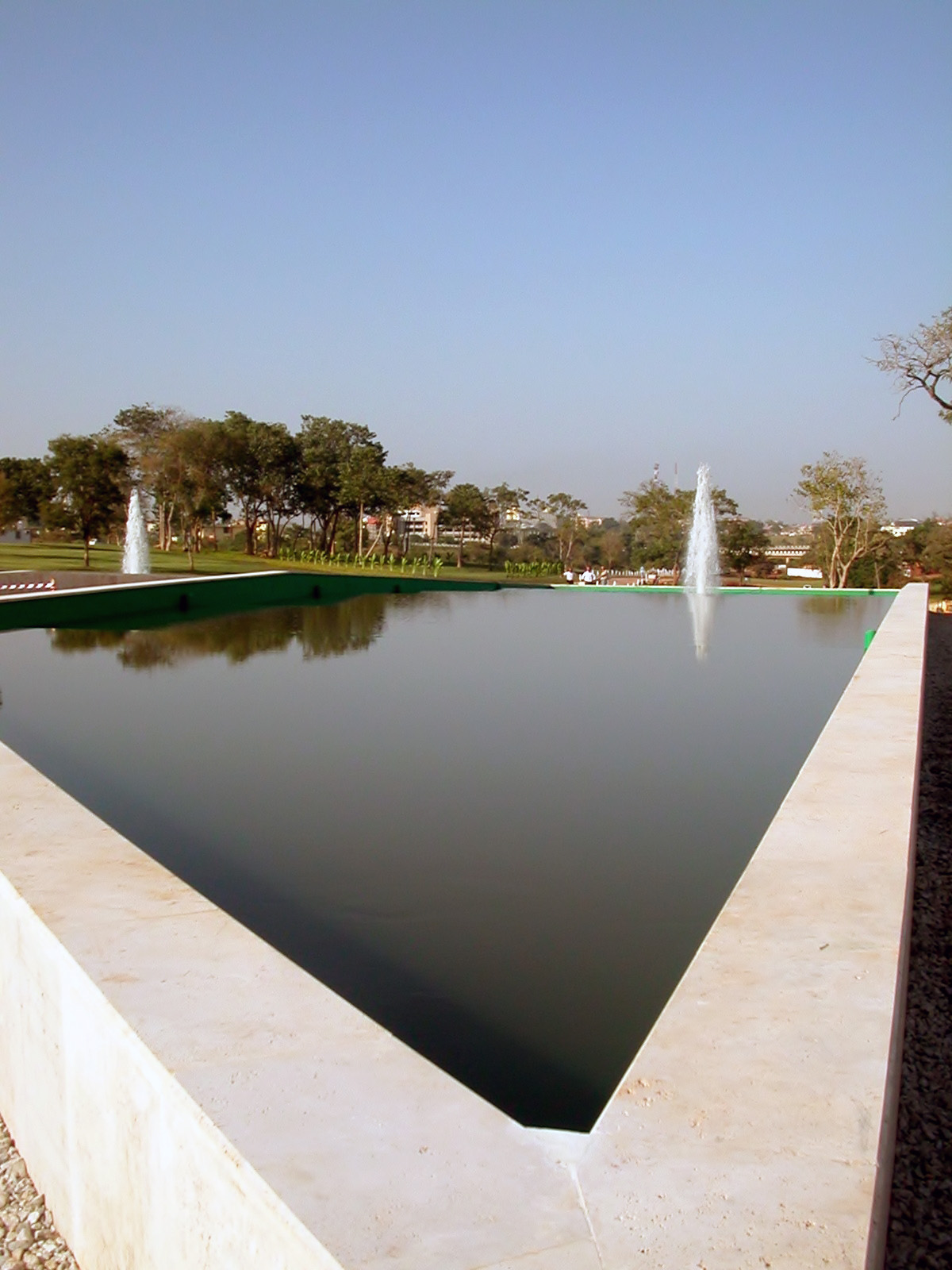
Millennium Park

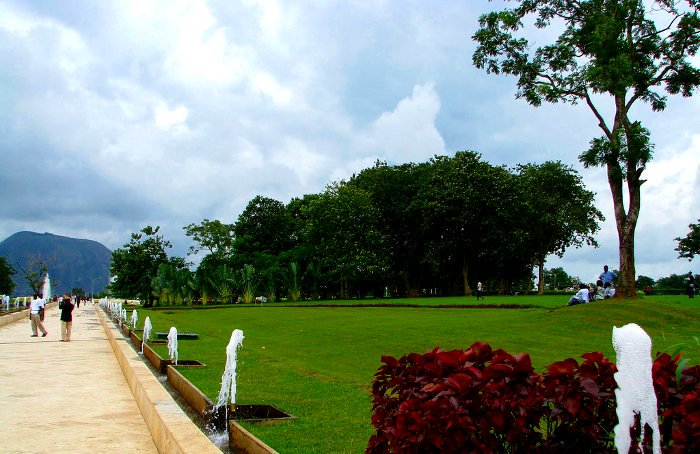
Abuja Millennium Park

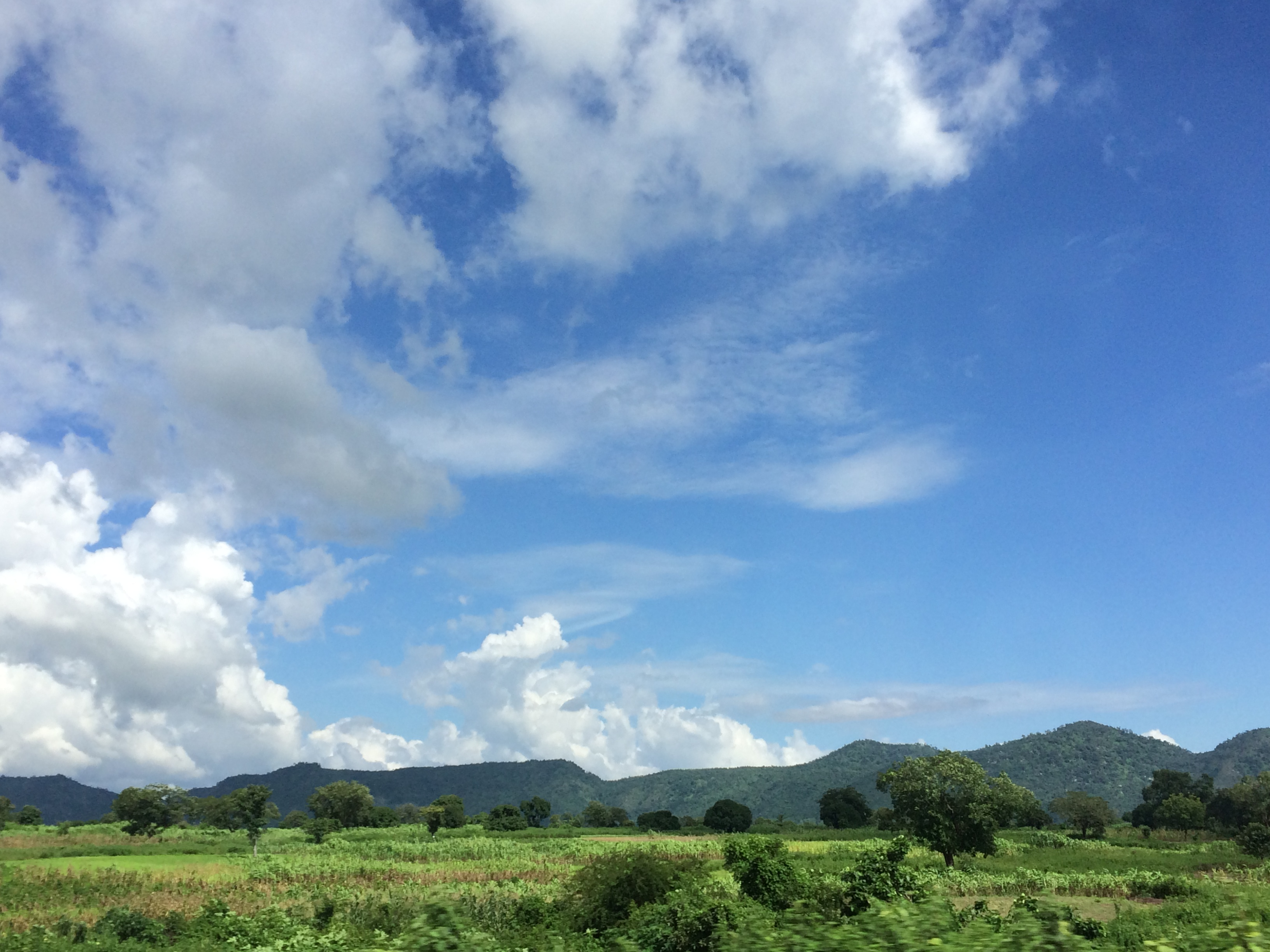
Green hills

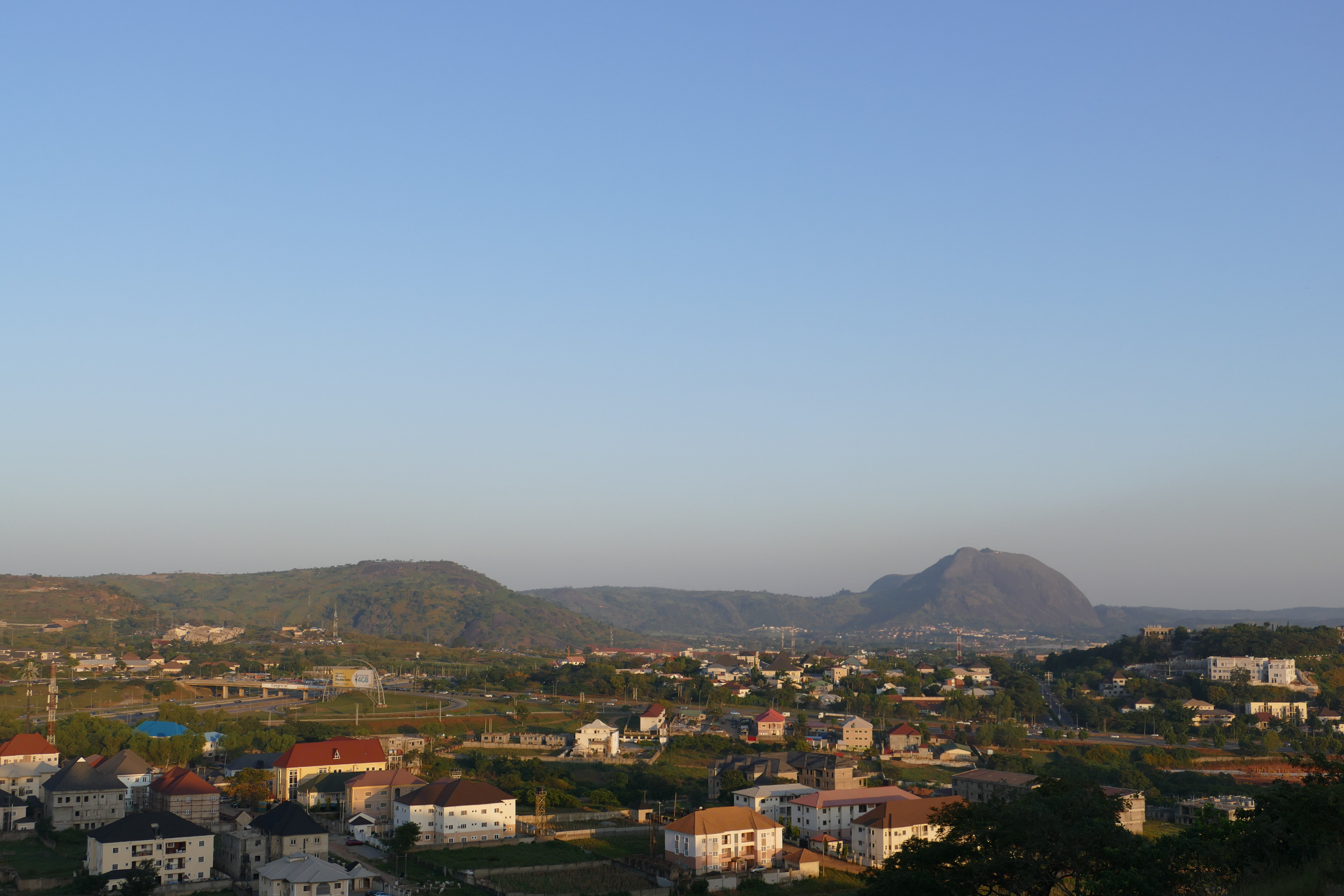
View of Abuja from Katampe hill

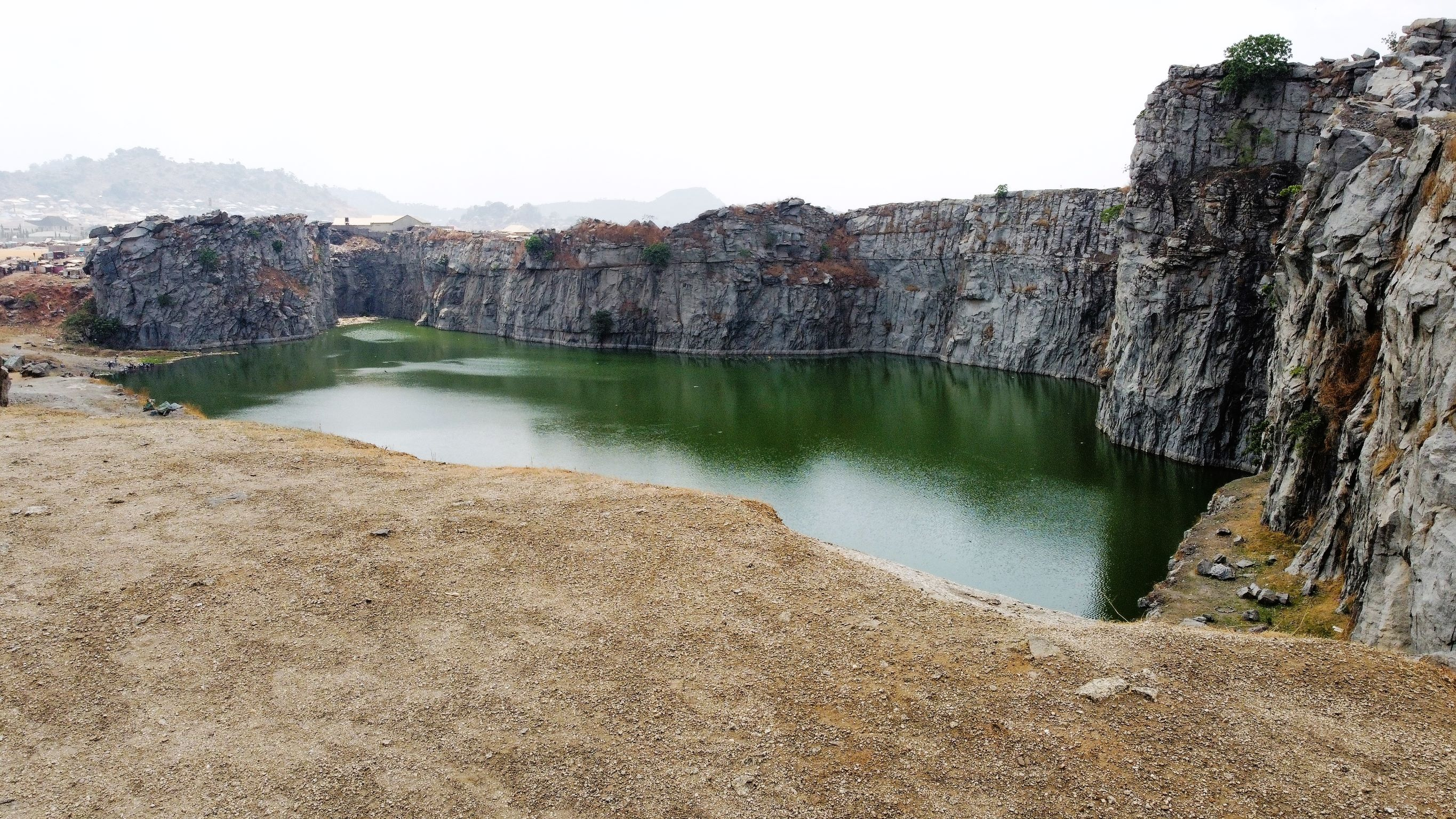
Crush Rock, Abuja

== Demographics ==
At the 2006 census, the city of Abuja had a population of 776,298, making it than the eighth most populous city in Nigeria. United Nations figures showed that Abuja grew by 139.7% between 2000 and 2010, making it the fastest-growing city in the world. As of 2015, the city is experiencing an annual growth of at least 35%, retaining its position as the fastest-growing city on the African continent and one of the fastest-growing in the world.

=== Conurbation ===
Abuja has witnessed a huge influx of people into the city; the growth has led to the emergence of satellite towns, such as Karu Urban Area, Suleja, Gwagwalada, Lugbe, Kuje and smaller settlements towards which the planned city is sprawling. The urban agglomeration centred upon Abuja had a population estimated at 3,770,000 in 2022. The city has a large and growing immigrant community consisting mainly of nationals from the ECOWAS sub-region. The city has been undergoing a rapid pace of physical development over the last fifteen years.

== Economy and infrastructure ==
=== Real estate ===
Real estate is a major driver of the Abuja economy - with the rise of numerous real estate companies in Nigeria, such as Hall7 Projects, Cosgrove, Ecogroverealty amongst many others. This correlates with the considerable growth and investment the city has seen as it has developed. The sources of this investment have been both foreign and local. The real estate sector continues to have a positive impact on the city, as it is a major avenue for employment.

=== Annual trade fair ===
The Abuja International Trade Fair (AITF) has been held annually since 2005, under the auspices of the Abuja Chamber of Commerce and Industry (ACCI). ACCI has also sought to link businesses to enhance trade with East Africa.

=== Postal system ===
Abuja is served by the Nigerian Postal Service (NIPOST) which maintains postal codes, street names and zones.

=== Transport ===
==== Airport ====
Nnamdi Azikiwe International Airport is the main airport serving Abuja and the surrounding capital region. It was named after Nigeria's first president, Nnamdi Azikiwe. The airport has international and domestic terminals.

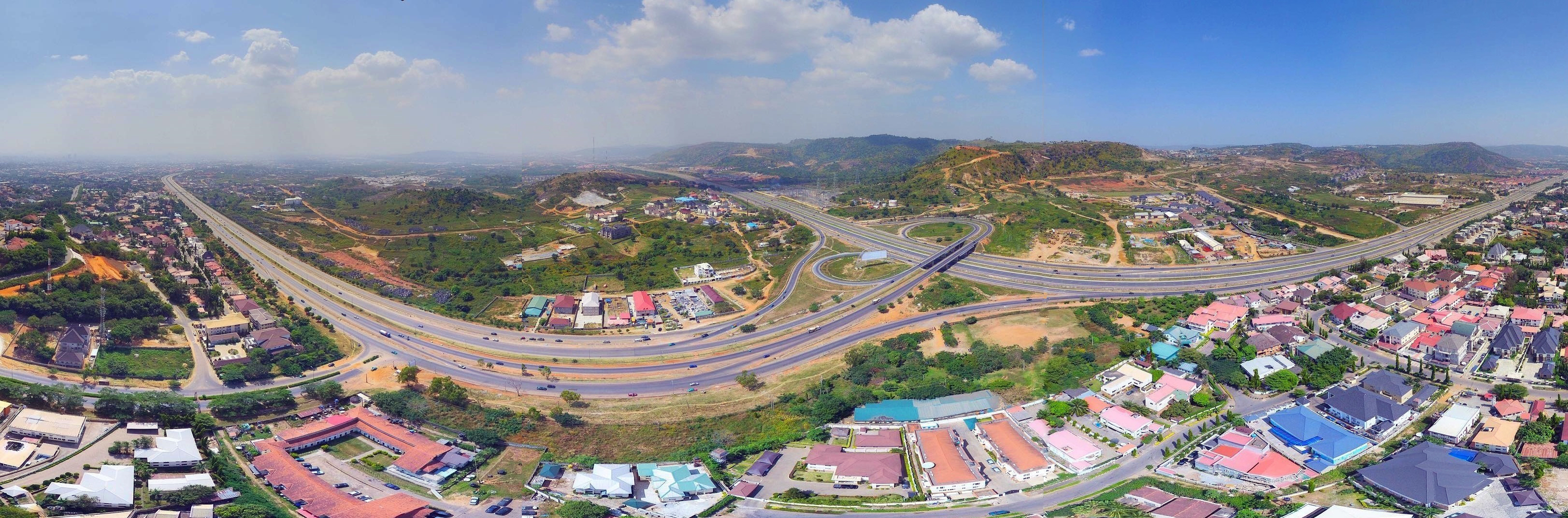
Abuja Highway panoramic

==== Highways ====
Abuja is also linked to Nasarawa, Plateau, Benue and Northeast Nigeria by the A234 Federal Highway, which starts from the city as the Goodluck Jonathan expressway, some portions of which are still under construction. A direct highway link to Minna in Niger State is still under construction. The A2 expressway links Abuja with Kaduna in the north and Lokoja in the south. There are also other highway links with the outlying region, such as that linking the suburb of Dutse Alhaji with the Lower Usuma and Gurara Dams, which supply water to the city.

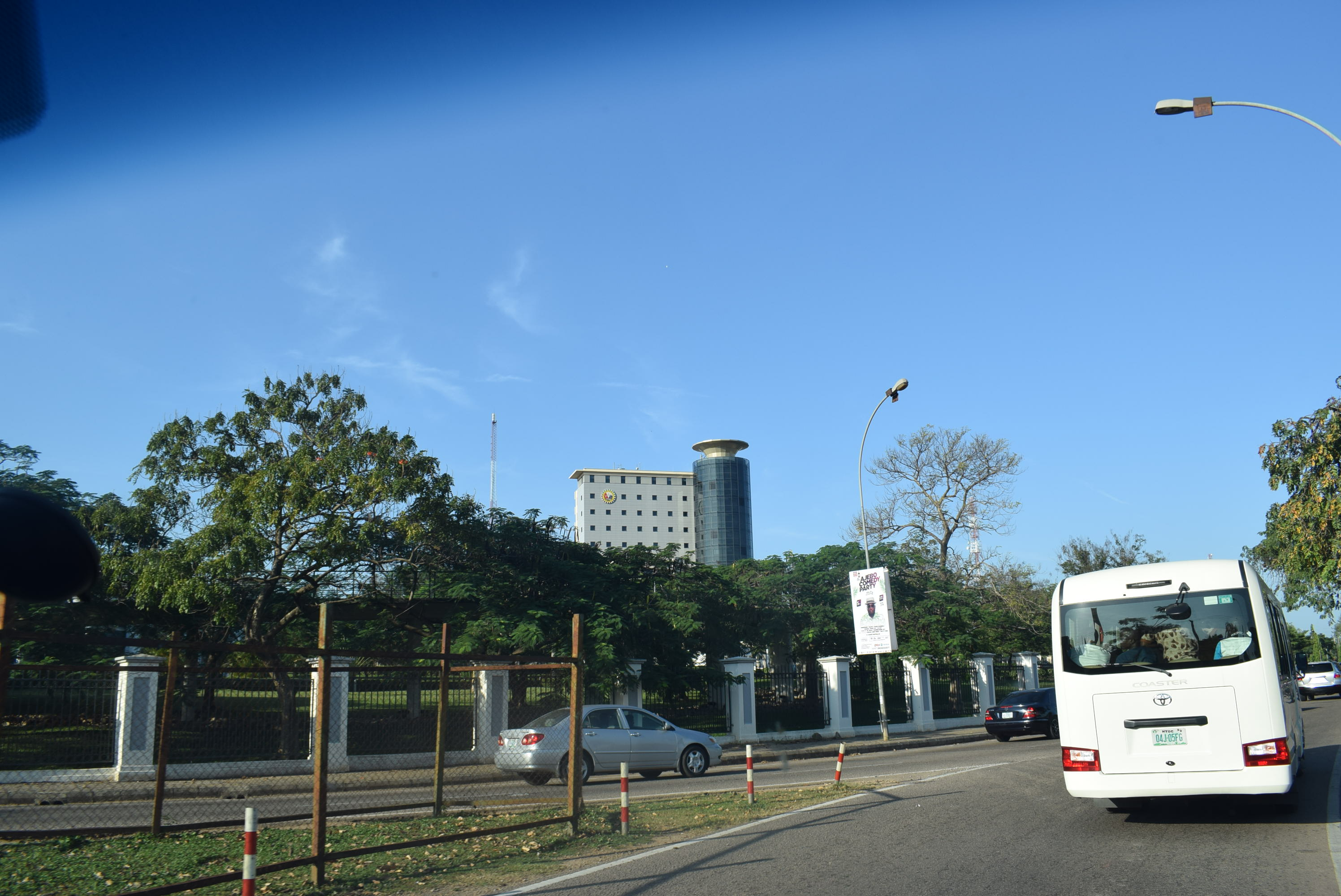
Cars on Sani Abacha way, Abuja

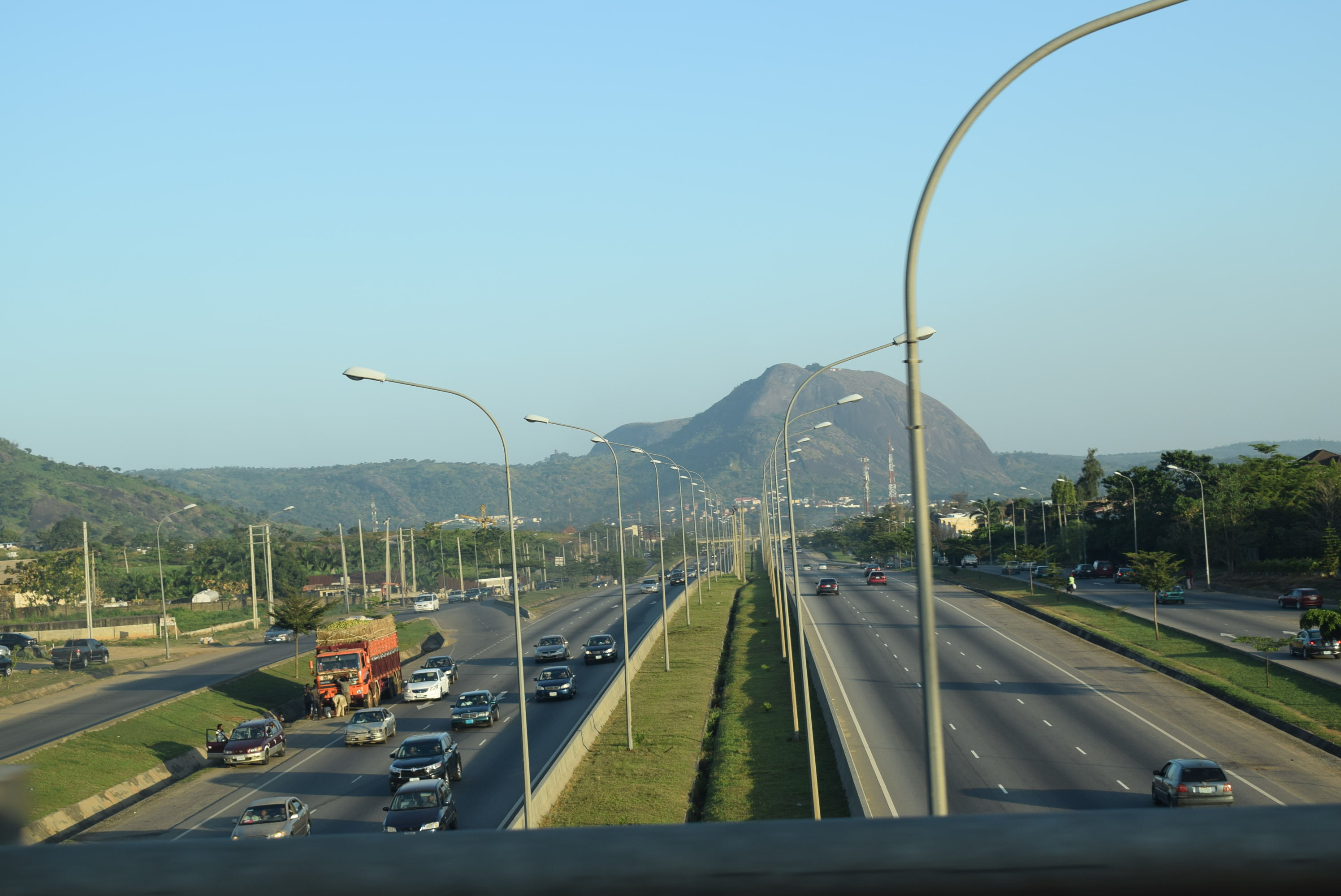
Abuja-Kubwa expressway part of the A234 highway in Nigeria

==== Rail ====
Abuja is on the route of the planned Lagos–Kano Standard Gauge Railway, which has been completed between Abuja and Kaduna. Trains for Kaduna depart from the Idu Railway Station in Abuja. There is a car park at the train station for passengers travelling to the city centre.

Abuja light rail opened in 2018 and became the first rapid transit in the country and in Western Africa. Abuja's light rail system was shut down in 2020 due to the COVID-19 epidemic. Traffic resumed on 29 May 2024.

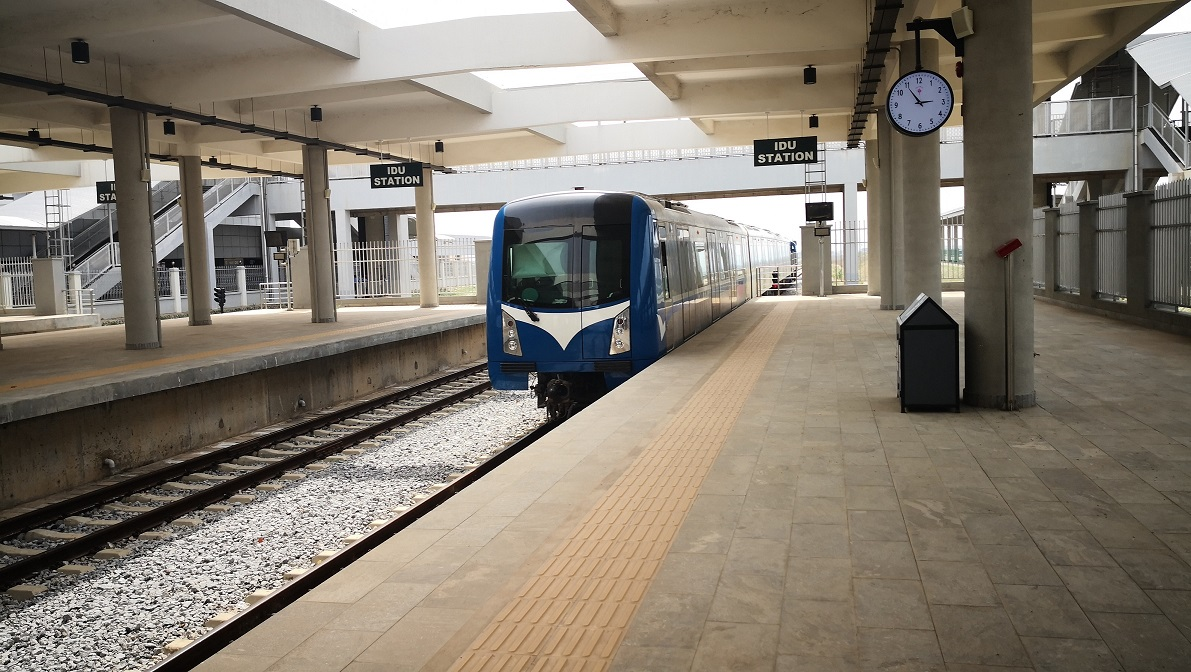
Train at Idu Station platform

Abuja rail mass transit map

== Education ==
Abuja is also known as one of the states in Nigeria that provides quality post-secondary education. It is speedily becoming an attraction for students due to the growing presence of both public and private universities.

=== Universities ===
- African University of Science and Technology
- Baze University
- National Open University of Nigeria
- Nile University of Nigeria
- Philomath University
- University of Abuja
- Veritas University

=== International schools ===
- American International School of Abuja
- École Française Marcel Pagnol
- Whiteplains British School, Jabi
- German School Abuja

== Natural resources ==
Abuja is one of the cities that are endowed with natural resources in Nigeria, and these resources serve as raw materials for pharmaceutical, food processing, medicinal and other processing companies, and they are also useful for commercial purposes, and as sources of food. Among these materials include:

=== Mineral raw materials ===
- Cassiterite
- Clay
- Dolomite
- Feldspar
- Gold
- Marble
- Talc
- Tantalite
- Tin

== Activities ==
Nigeria and China have reaffirmed their commitment to deeper cooperation in culture, media, science, and technology during an event in Abuja. Officials from both the countries highlighted cultural exchange, innovation, and people-people ties as key to strengthening bilateral relations and promoting mutual understanding.

2026, The U.S. Embassy Abuja has signed a three-year MoU with the IIH to Advance AI, STEM education, and tech skills development, strengthening innovation and U.S. Nigeria collaboration.

TechBridge Foundation has empowered 90 girls at Government Secondary School, Apo, Abuja, through its HerVoice initiative to promote STEM education and digital skills. The programme expose students to technology career opportunities, while the foundation also announced plans to sponsor the school fees of selected vulnerable female students.

== Honorary citizens ==
People awarded the honorary citizenship of Abuja are:

Date	Name	Notes
10 February 2016	Joachim Gauck (24 January 1940–)	President of Germany (2012–2017)
4 July 2018	Emmanuel Macron (21 December 1977–)	President of France (2017–).
30 August 2018	Rt. Hon. Theresa May (1 October 1956–)	Prime minister of the United Kingdom (2016–2019).

== See also ==
- Centenary City

== Sources ==
- Abba, Alkasum (2012). Abuja: The Making of a Capital City, 1976–2006. Centre for Democratic Development Research and Training. OCLC 861305001.
