= Maitama (name) =

- Gender: Male
- Language: Hausa

Origin
- Derivation: mài + tamā
- Meaning: one with iron ore
- Region of origin: West Africa

Maitama is a male Hausa name. It is derived from two words mài (possessor of) and tamā (iron ore), and originally meant "one with iron ore". It is often used as an epithet for the Islamic name Yusuf.

== Notable individuals with the name ==
- Yusuf Maitama Sule CFR (1929 – 2017), Nigerian politician, diplomat, and elderly statesman.
- Bello Maitama Yusuf GCON (1947 – 2023), Nigerian politician and businessman.
- Yusuf Tuggar OON (born 1967), Nigerian diplomat and politician.

== Places ==
- Yusuf Maitama Sule University, Kano
- Maitama, a district in Abuja, Nigeria
