= Astana Triathlon Park =

Urban park in Astana, Kazakhstan

Coordinates: 51°8′10″N 71°26′59″E

- Астана триатлон паркі
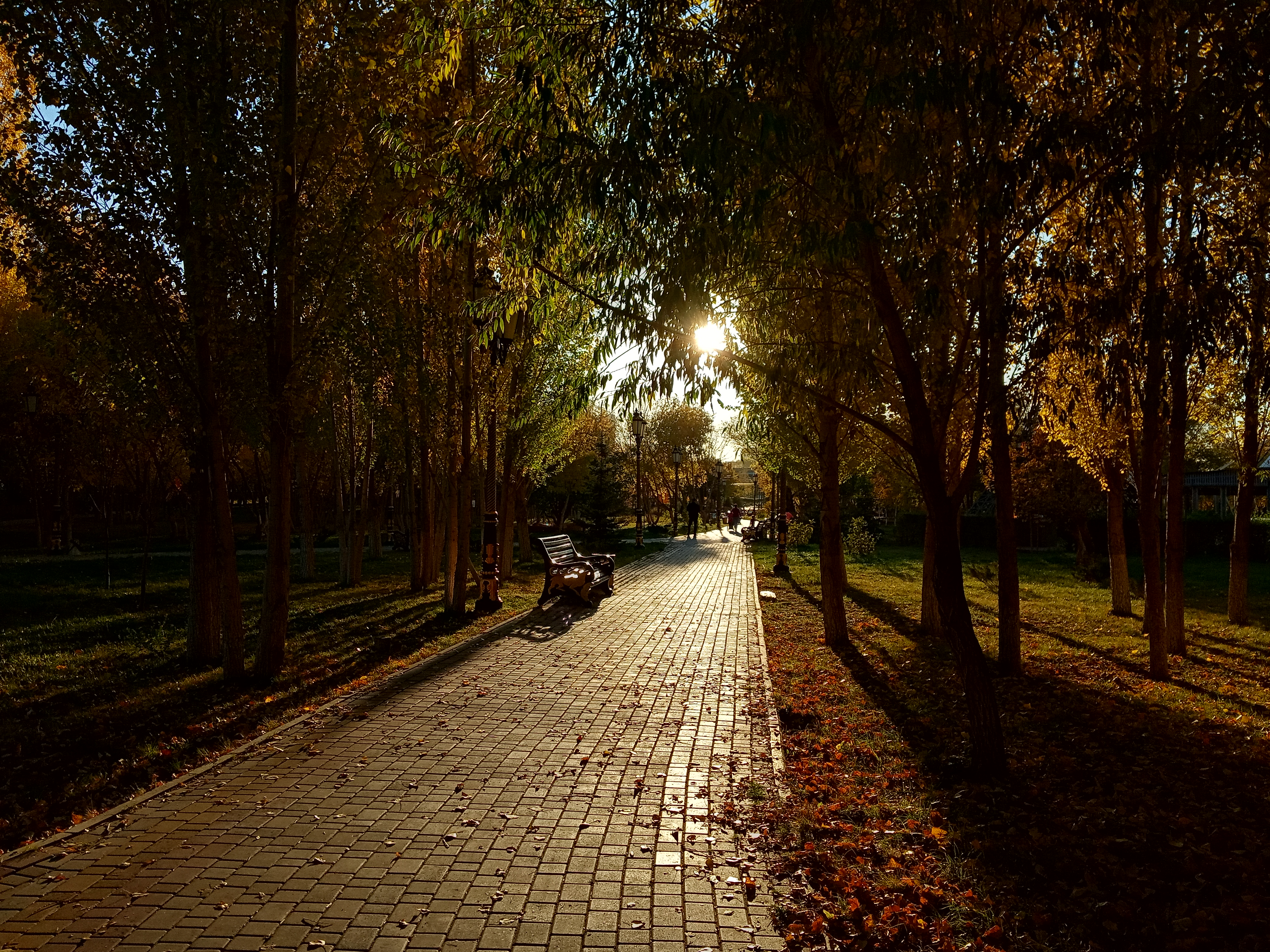
- Interactive map of Astana Triathlon Park
- Location: Astana, Kazakhstan
- Area: 45 hectares (110 acres)
- Opened: July 2016
- Designer: Bi Group

Astana Triathlon Park (Kazakh: Астана триатлон паркі, romanized: Astana triatlon parkı) is an urban park in Astana that is used as a recreation area for jogging, skiing and cycling. It was opened in July 2016 as a gift for the 18th anniversary of Capital City Day from the largest construction holding in Kazakhstan Bi Group. It is located right beside the Bauyrzhan Momyshuly Park and Presidential Park in the right embankment of the Ishim river.

The park is known for its yearly sports event that take place with the first one being held in 2018. In October 2018, it was announced that a sports complex would be built within the park.
