= Arezzo Courthouse =

Judiciary building in Arezzo, Italy

- Interactive map of the Arezzo Courthouse area

General information
- Status: Completed
- Location: Arezzo, Tuscany, Italy
- Coordinates: 43°27′50″N 11°53′31″E
- Construction started: June 2004
- Opening: February 2008; 18 years ago
- Cost: € 14,000,000

Technical details
- Floor area: 30,000 m^{2} (320,000 sq ft)

Design and construction
- Architect: Manfredi Nicoletti

The Arezzo Courthouse (Italian: Palazzo di Giustizia di Arezzo, lit. 'Palace of Justice of Arezzo') is a judicial complex located in Arezzo, Italy. The building was designed by Italian architect Manfredi Nicoletti and opened in February 2008.

== Description ==
The complex comprises two main structures: the first is a renovated building that originally served as the Sanatorium "Antonio Garbasso" and now houses most of the court offices. The second structure was constructed between 2004 and 2008 and serves multiple functions, including parking facilities, archives, a large multi-level lobby, two substantial double-height courtrooms, various offices, a press room, as well as restrooms and ancillary spaces. This building features a solid, geometrically complex form.

The layout of the complex is based on an elliptical plan derived from a conical section with an inclined vertex. The curved granite wall follows the surface of the cone, although its external façade is composed of flat slabs of identical size. The southern façade consists of two undulating surfaces. These complex curves are realized using straightforward structural elements—rectilinear steel pillars positioned at various angles, supporting modular steel connecting components arranged in a rectilinear configuration.

The architectural design of the new building incorporates two fundamental bioclimatic principles: passive cooling and heating. Accordingly, the façade is designed to be more sheltered on the northern side, while it is more open on the southern side to facilitate optimal climate regulation and reduce energy consumption.
