= Kazakhstan Central Concert Hall =

Concert hall in Astana, Kazakhstan

- Interactive map of the Kazakhstan Central Concert Hall area

General information
- Status: Completed
- Location: Astana, Kazakhstan
- Coordinates: 51°07′22″N 71°26′30″E
- Construction started: June 2004
- Opening: Dec 2009
- Cost: € 120.000.000,00

Technical details
- Floor area: 55,000 m^{2} (590,000 sq ft)

Design and construction
- Architect: Manfredi Nicoletti
- Main contractor: Mabetex

The Central Concert Hall (Kazakh: «Qazaqstan» Ortalyq kontsert zaly; Russian: Центральный концертный зал «Казахстан») is a center for performing arts in Astana, the capital city of Kazakhstan. It was designed by Italian architect Manfredi Nicoletti and inaugurated by the President of Kazakhstan, Nursultan Nazarbayev, on the nation's Independence Day, 15 December, in 2009.

The building’s shape evokes the dynamism of a flower's petals. The building's external structure comprises a series of curved inclined walls made of concrete with a blue back painted glass panels cladding. Those structures protect the building's interior functions from Astana’s harsh weather.

The building features a thirty-meter-high foyer which extends over 3.000 square meters, which is intended to create an urban-scale internal public square that could welcome the citizens of Astana throughout the entire year. The building contains three different music halls. It also encloses restaurants, shops, and bars.

The main Concert hall for 3,500 seats is one of the biggest of its kind and is capable of hosting a multitude of different events, from classical to pop music, ballet and conferences thanks to its acoustic flexibility. This flexibility is produced by a system of acoustic curtains and a special false ceiling design called a black-hole, which absorbs most of the acoustic reflections of the hall.

The two smaller halls, of 400 and 200 seats respectively, have been designed to be flexible enough to host chamber music as well as cinema and conferences.

The International Astana Action Film Festival was held there in 2010.
