= Millennium Park (Abuja) =

Public park in Abuja, Nigeria

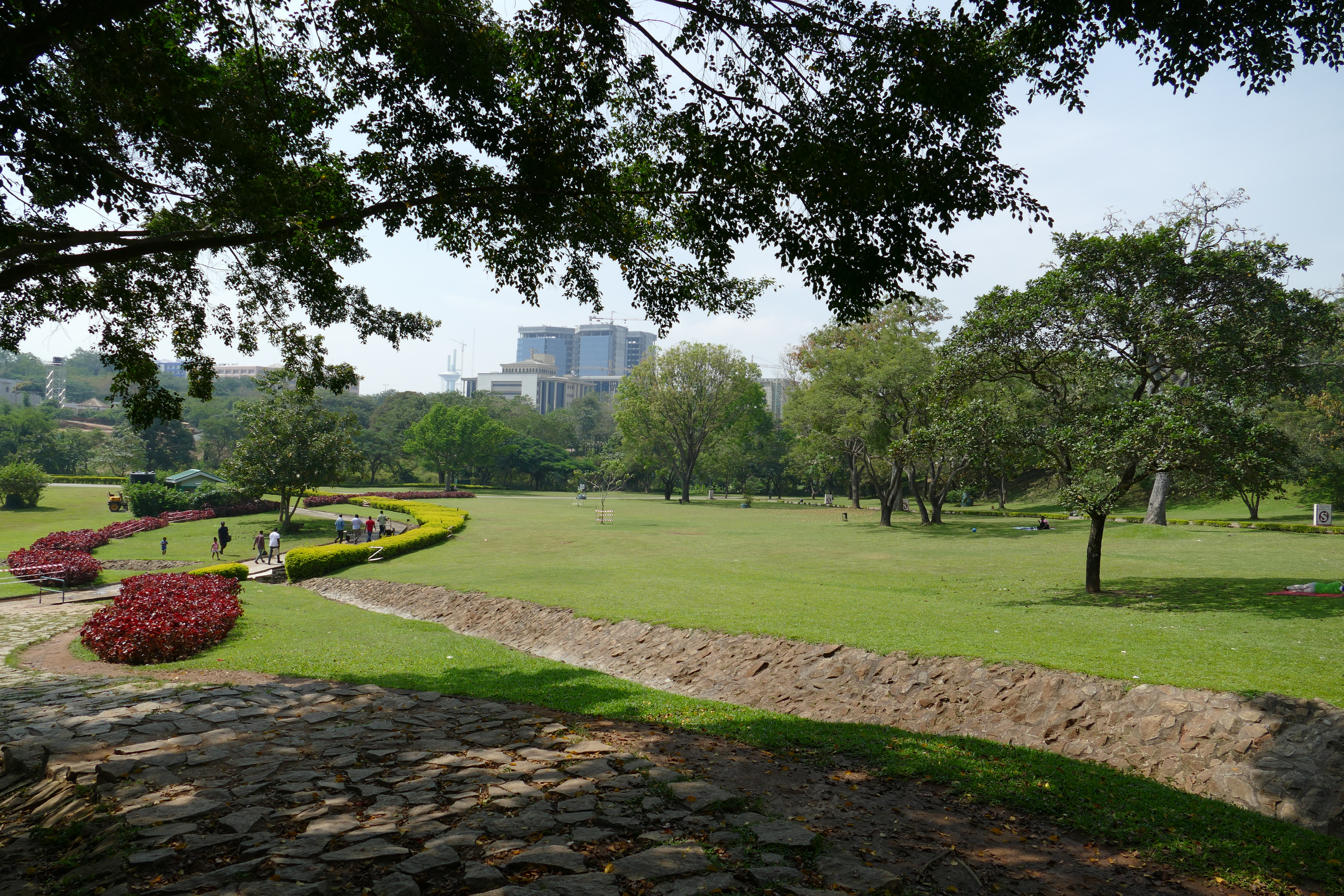
- Interactive map of Millennium Park
- Type: Public Park
- Location: Maitama, Abuja, Nigeria
- Area: 32 ha (80 acres)
- Created: 4 December 2003; 22 years ago
- Operator: City of Abuja and SALINI Nigeria Ltd

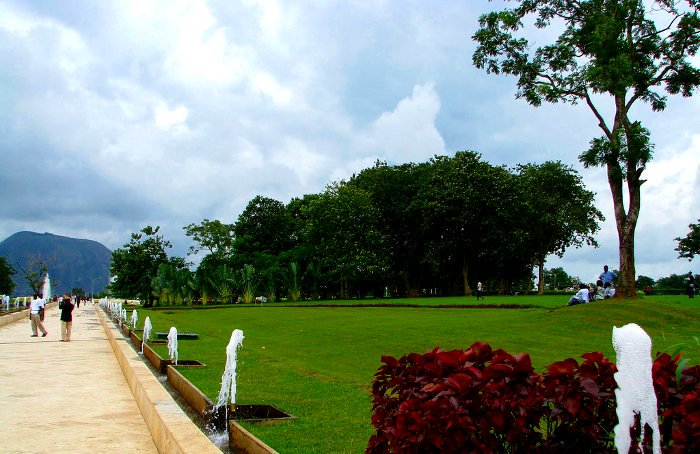
North view of the park

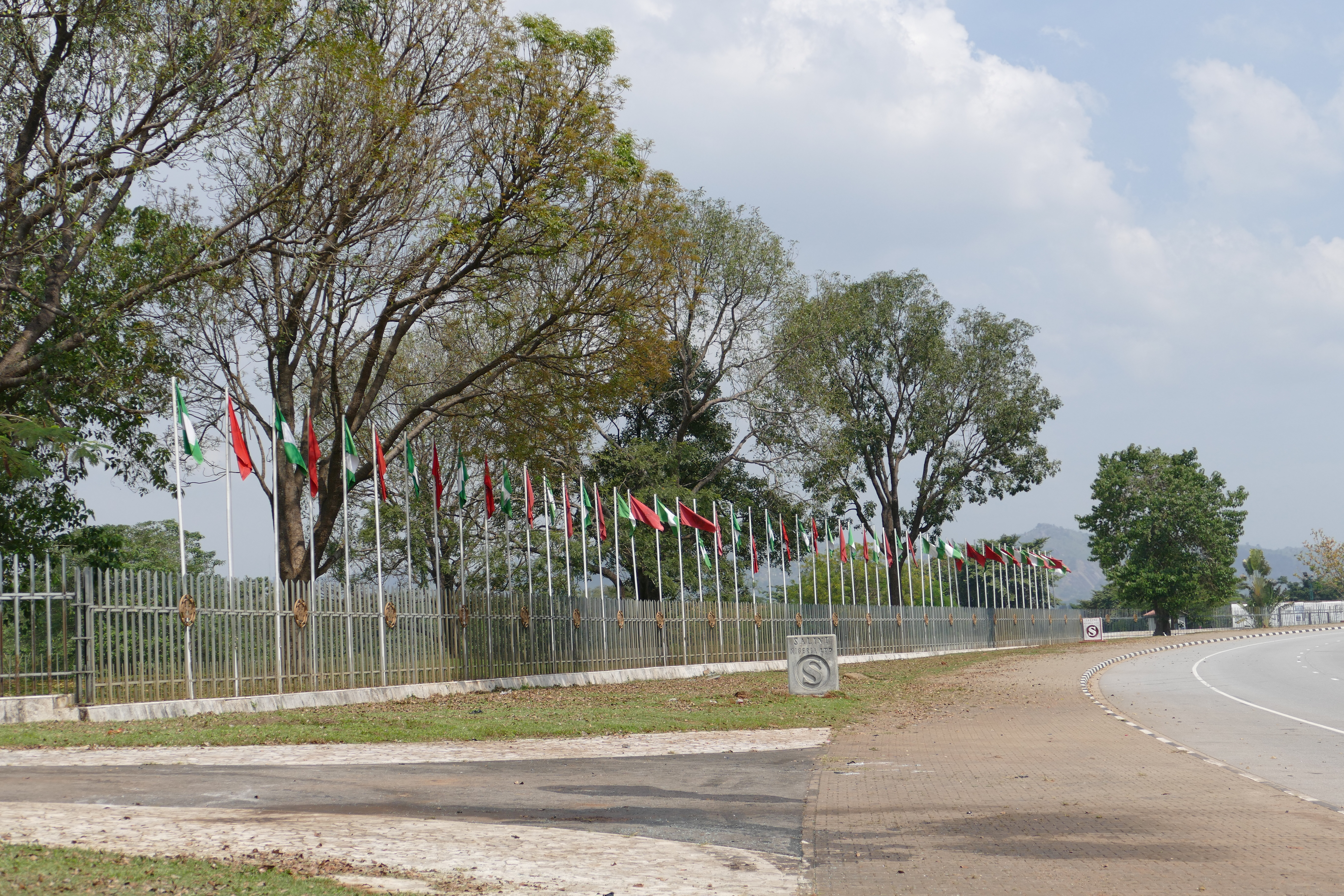
Abuja Millenium Park 2019

The Millennium Park is the largest public park of Abuja, the capital of Nigeria and is located in the Maitama district of the city.

The Millennium Park was inaugurated by Queen Elizabeth II on 4 December 2003. It is near the former Presidential Palace close to the nucleus of presidential and administrative buildings of the city.

A river crosses the Park in its main rectilinear axis, dividing it into two parts.

One side on the Park is dedicated to uncontaminated nature. In a system of terraces at different levels are located Nigeria's mountain vegetation, savanna, deciduous forest, rainforest and brushwood as well as greenhouses for butterflies and tropical birds.

The other side, corresponding to the main entrance from road, is dedicated to the scientific knowledge of the natural environment. This part of the Park has a very traditional and rigid Italian Style Garden Layout. Entering the Park, a rectilinear path completely paved with Roman white travertine brings the public into its green areas. A series of fountains run alongside this white mark refreshing the public during the hottest days. This path visually links the enormous Cotton Tree, a holy tree of Abuja situated on one side of the Millennium Park, with the Aso Rock, the holy Rock of Abuja. The path layout is based on a trident geometry separated by huge polygonal pools. The roads are crossed by a series of multicoloured bushes going from yellow to red with a very particular wave-like course.

This Park, conceived and designed by the Italian architect Manfredi Nicoletti, has quickly become one of the main attractions of the city of Abuja bringing thousands of people together each day.

During the Millennium Park opening ceremony, each Commonwealth Head of State has planted symbolically a Ravenala madagascariensis palm giving birth to the Park. Among others were present the President of Nigeria Olusegun Obasanjo, UK prime Minister Tony Blair and Queen Elizabeth II.

== Gallery ==
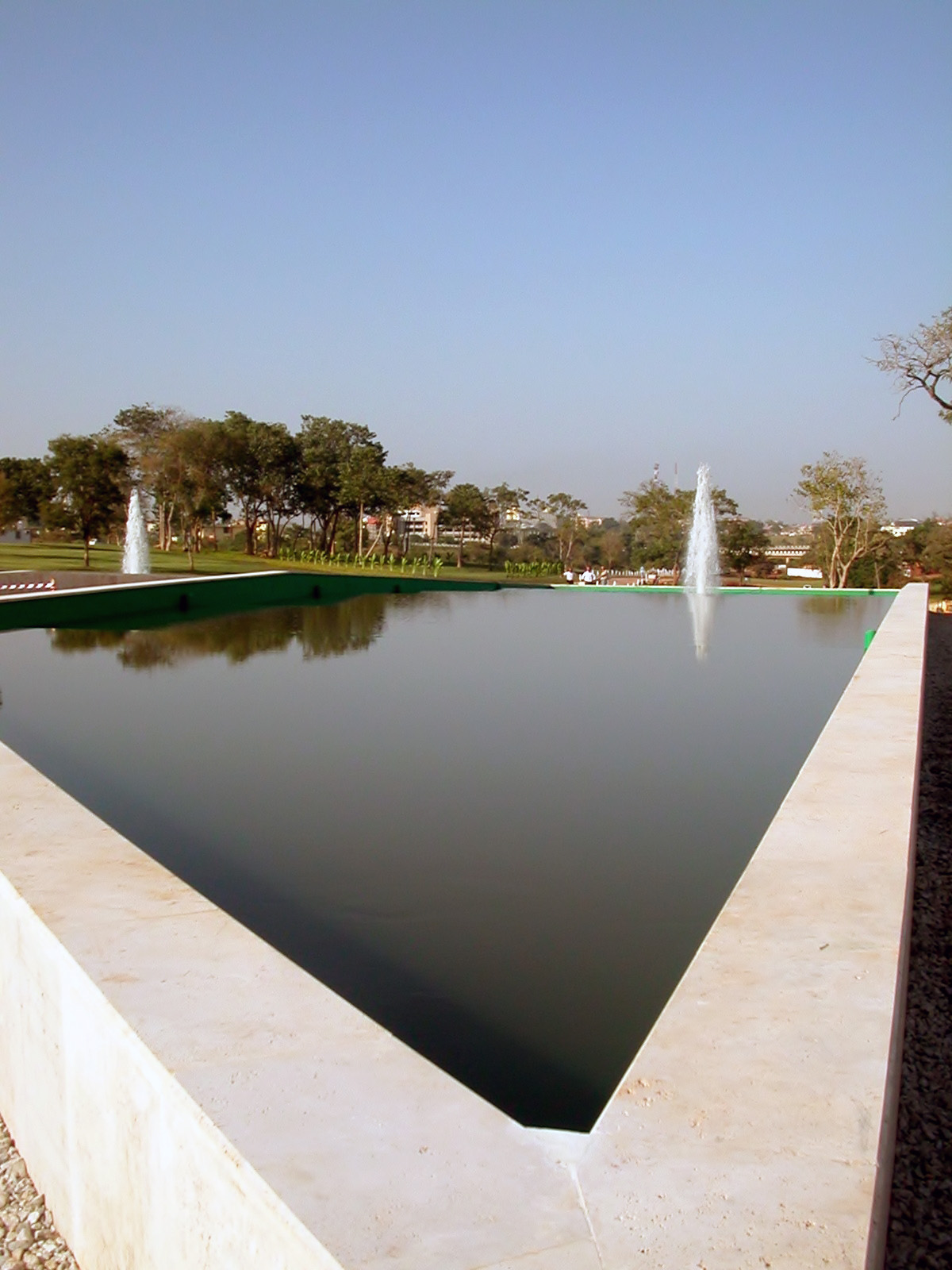
Pools and fountains in the park

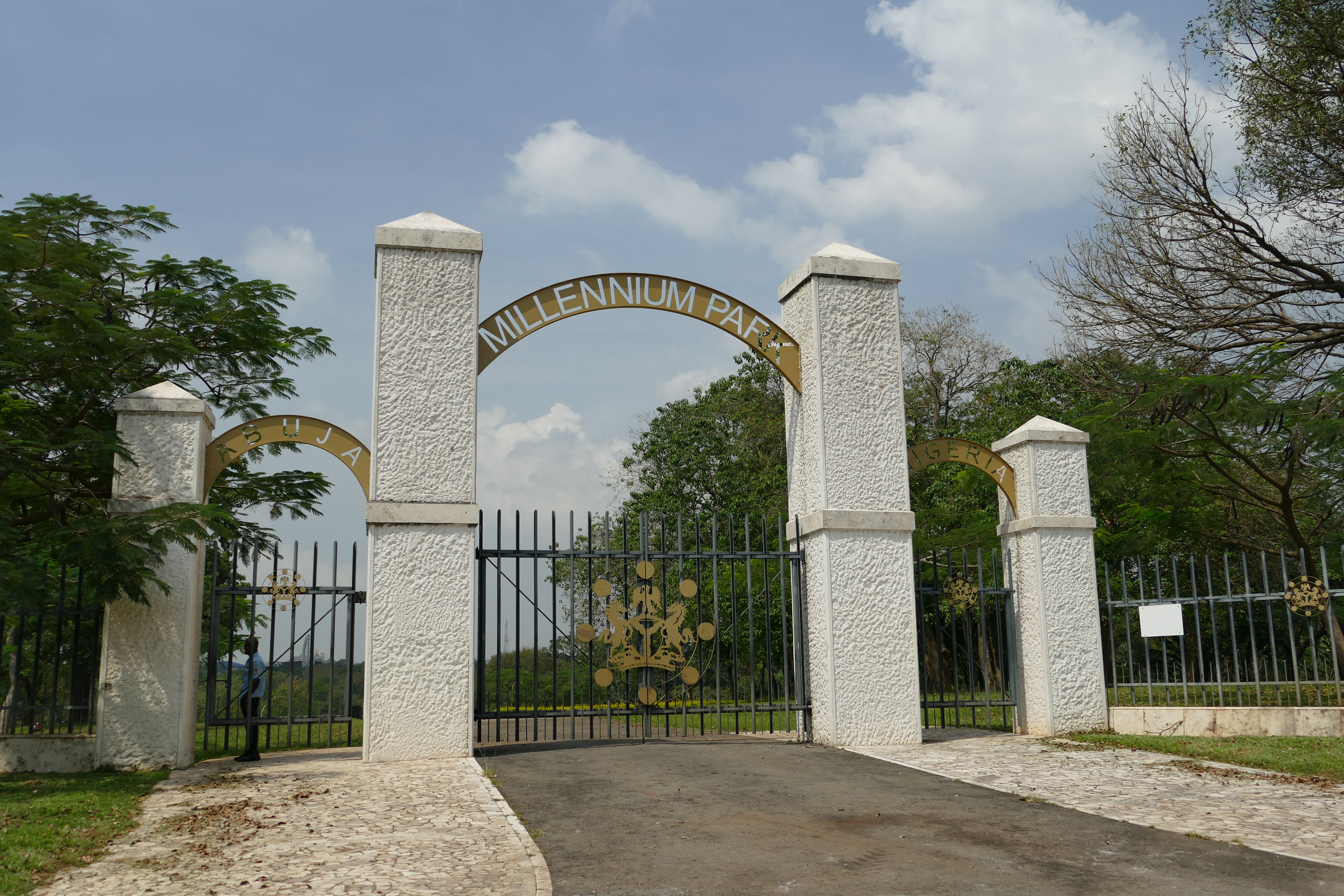
Park's main entrance

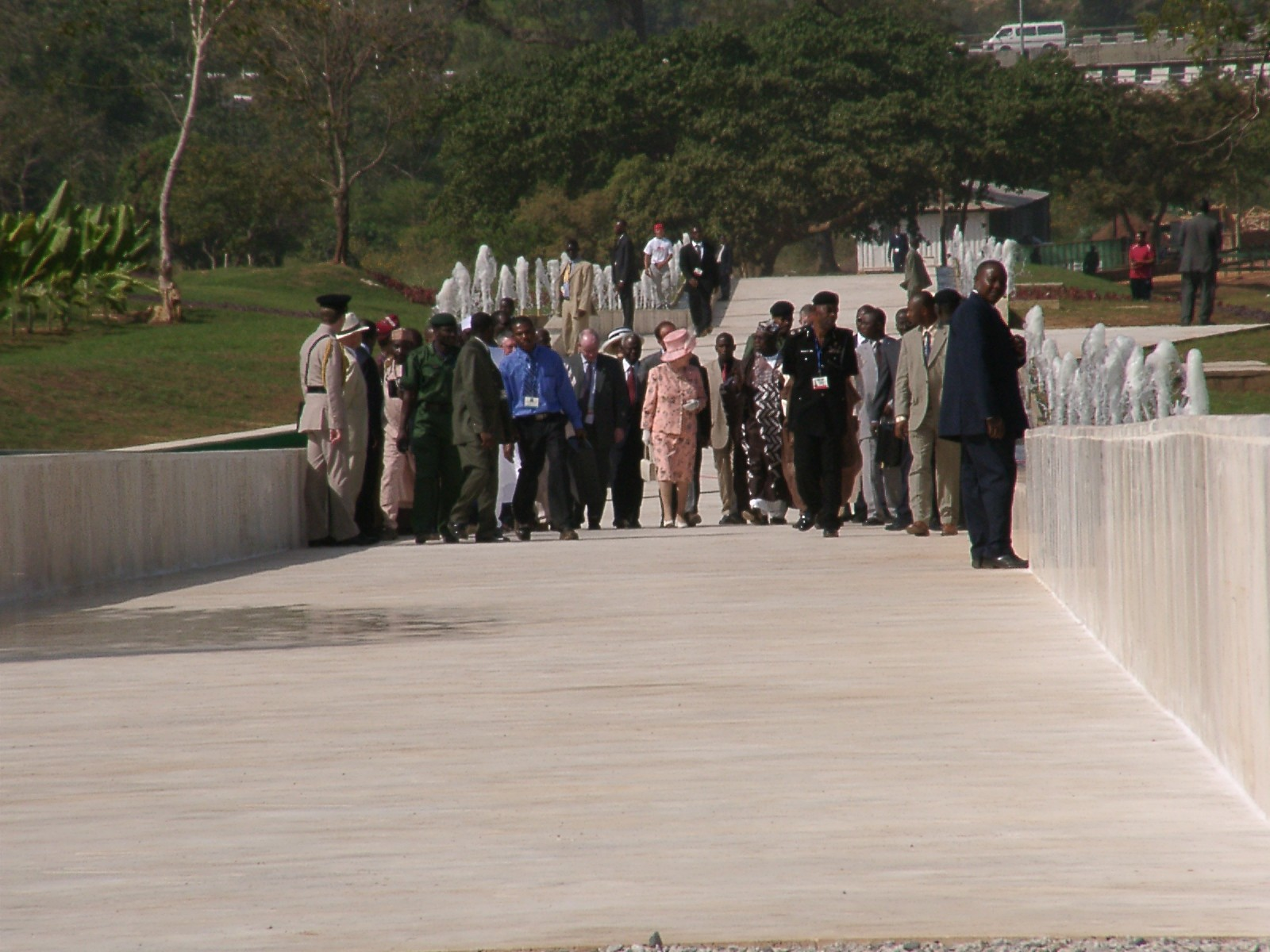
Queen Elizabeth II at the Inauguration Ceremony

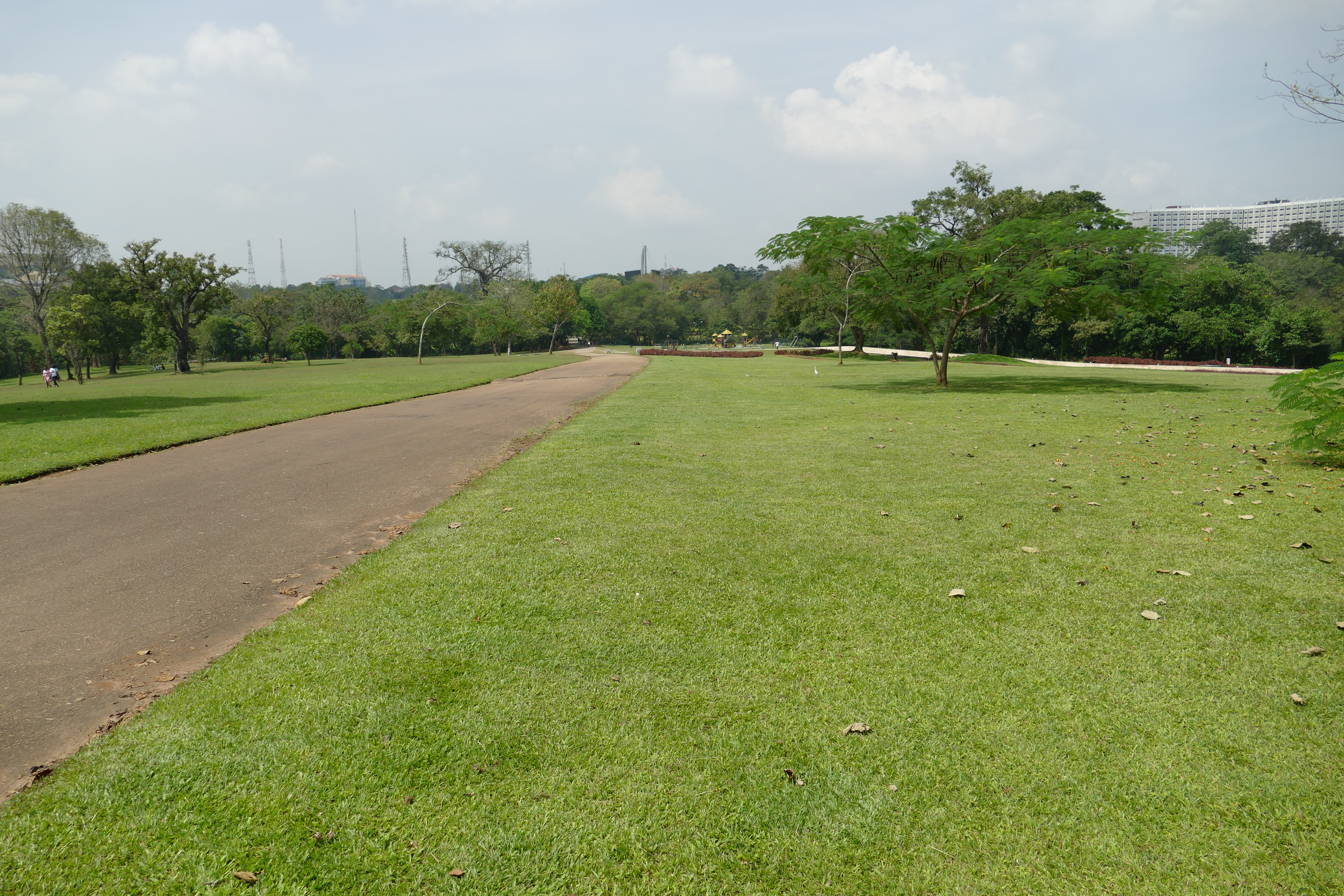
South View of the park

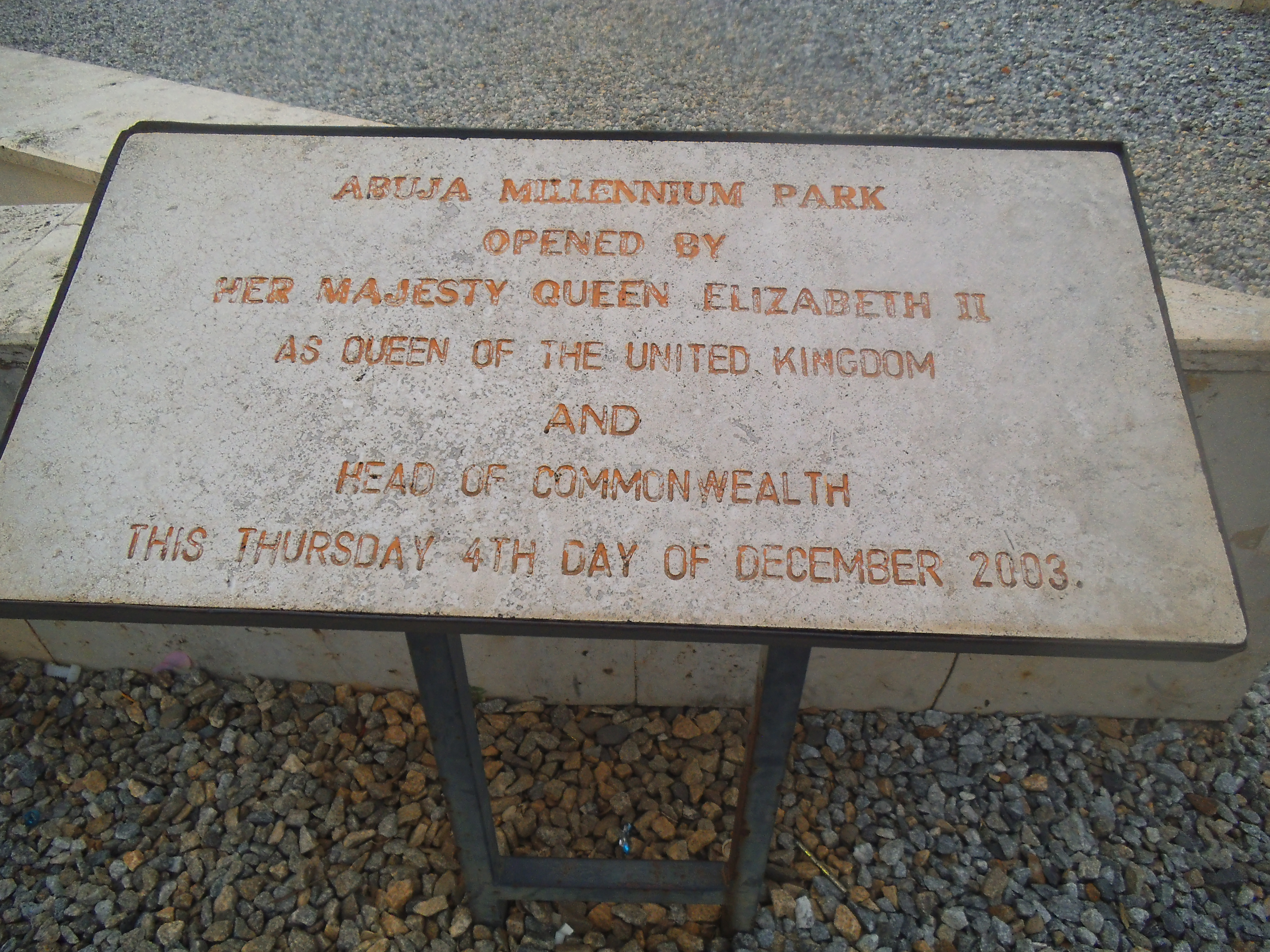
Commemoration plaque

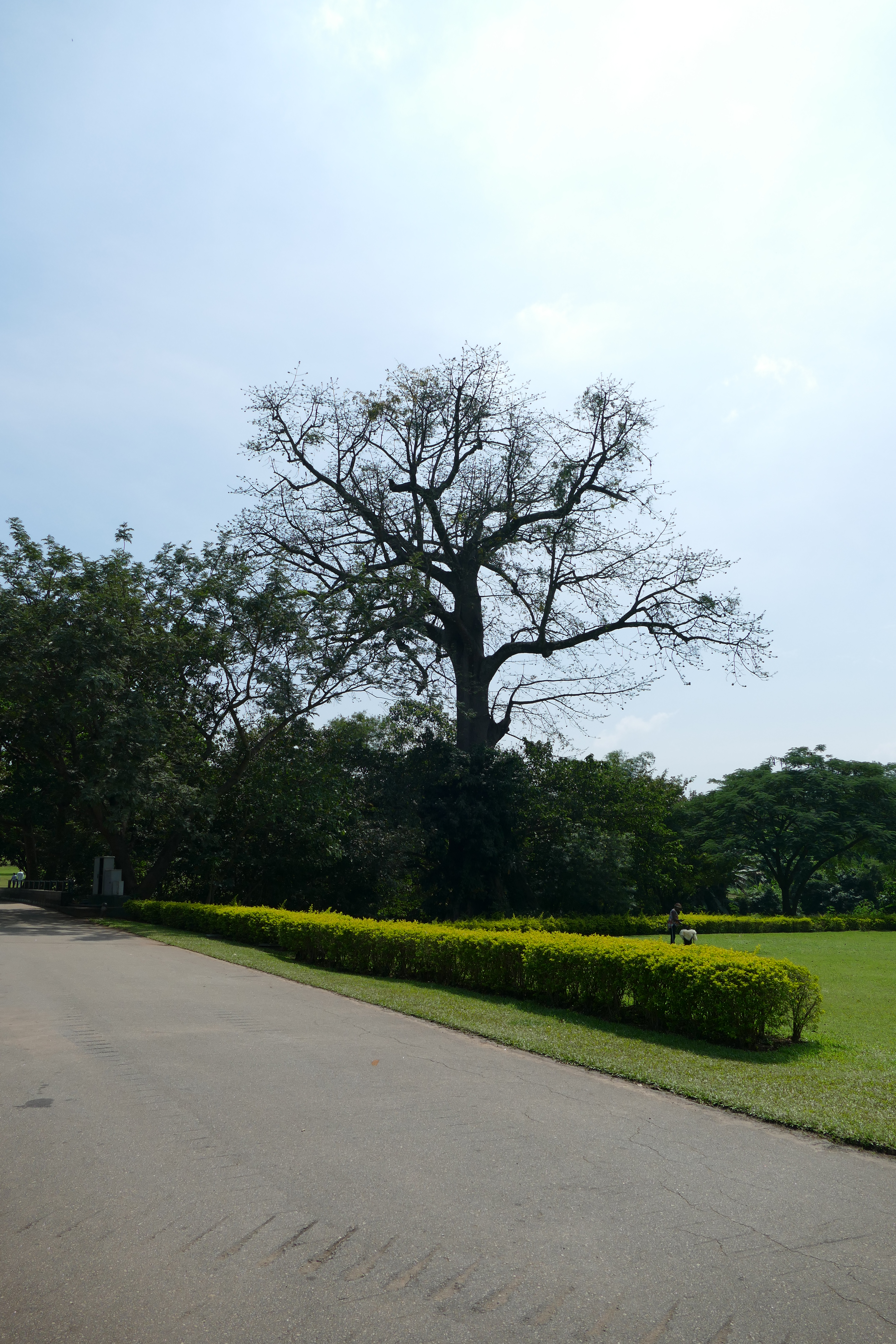
Abuja Millenium Park 2019
