= Millennium Tower (Abuja) =

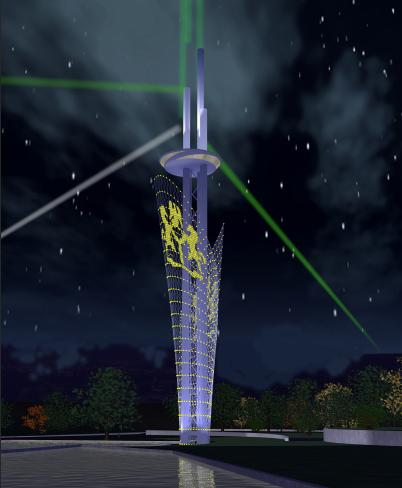
- A render of the Millennium Tower at night
- Interactive map of the Millennium Tower area

General information
- Status: Under construction
- Type: Mixed-Use
- Location: Abuja, FCT, Nigeria
- Coordinates: 9.0558427°N 7.4928093°E
- Construction started: 2006
- Topped-out: 2014
- Cost: ₦53 billion

Height
- Roof: 170 m (560 ft)
- Top floor: 110 m (360 ft)

Technical details
- Lifts/elevators: 3

Design and construction
- Architect: Manfredi Nicoletti
- Main contractor: Salini Nigeria LTD

The Millennium Tower and Cultural Centre project is one of a number of projects in the Central District of Nigeria's capital city of Abuja. At 170 metres (560 ft), it is the tallest artificial structure in Abuja. The tower was designed by Manfredi Nicoletti and is part of the Nigeria National Complex which also includes the Nigerian Cultural Centre, an eight-storey, low rise, pyramid shaped Cultural Centre. Construction for the tower started in 2006 and was topped out in 2014 whilst the cultural centre is still under construction.

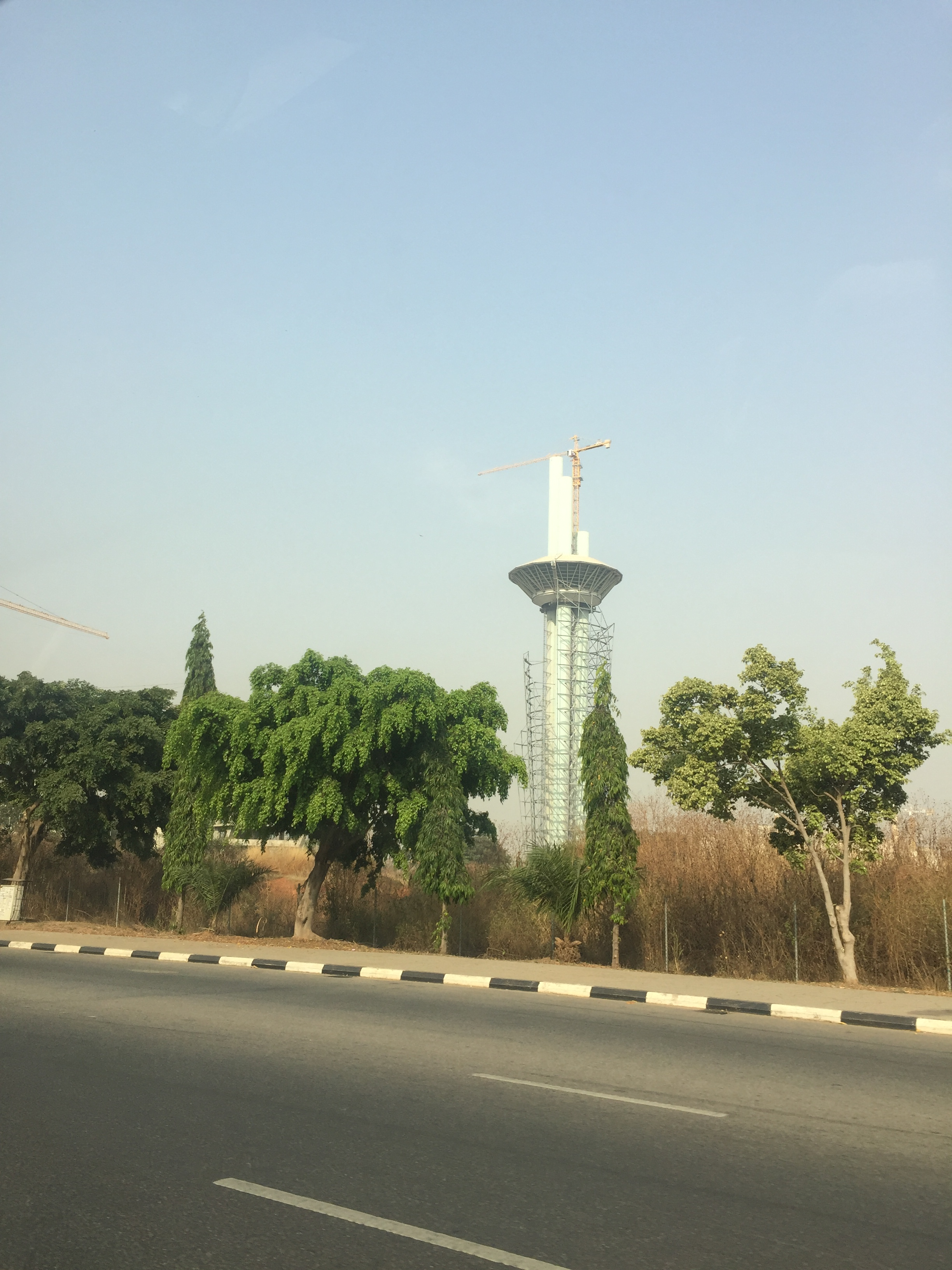
The Millennium Tower, still under construction in January 2017

The site is served by a main road, so the two structures will be linked via an underground arcade. The tower consists of three cylindrical concrete pillar-like structures varying in height and linked together near the tower's first peak using a disc-shaped section that is intended to house in its two floors an observation deck and a viewing restaurant. Around the pillars of the tower, three transparent stainless steel wings wrap around the base of the tower and gradually open outwards in a fan-like fashion as they extend up the height of the tower.

== See also ==
- List of towers
