= Manfredi Nicoletti =

Italian architect (1930–2017)

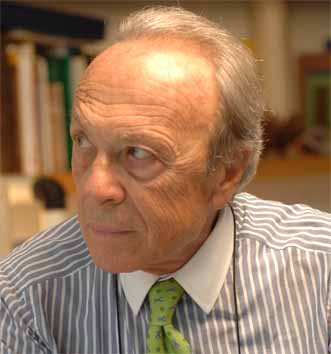
Manfredi Nicoletti, 2009

Manfredi Nicoletti (16 June 1930 – 29 October 2017) was an Italian architect.

== Biography ==
Nicoletti is considered a pioneer in Bioclimatic urban and architectural design. In the 1970s, his book L'ecosistema urbano (The Urban Ecosystem) - a term which he coined - creates a connection between environmental matters and psychological and cultural values. In this volume, experts in various disciplines such as psychology, anthropology, biology, engineering, botany, urban history, economy and acoustics contribute to opening a rich discussion on the theme of urban ecosystems.

He founded and headed at the Rome University La Sapienza the course of Urban Morphology and Ecology in 1972 and later the course of Ecosystemic Architecture in 1995.

Consultant in urban ecology for the Italian Government and the European Community. Member of Eurosolar and PLEA, he was awarded the international prize WREN (World Renewable Energy Network).

Born in Rieti, Nicoletti began his artistic and intellectual career very young in the studio of Giacomo Balla. In Rome, he studied under Pier Luigi Nervi and graduated in architecture in 1954. The same year, he received a Fulbright Scholarship to the Massachusetts Institute of Technology, where he took his master's degree in 1955. During that time he was a student of Buckminster Fuller, Pietro Belluschi, Eero Saarinen, and Louis Kahn. He worked in the studio of Walter Gropius and was assistant to Sigfried Giedion at Harvard University. Up to 1957, he collaborated with the studio of Minoru Yamasaki.

Upon his return to Italy, Manfredi worked with Pier Luigi Nervi. As a member of the National Institute for Urban Studies, he was one of the founders of the National Institute for Architecture together with Bruno Zevi. In 1962 he returned to MIT with a Sloan Grant and was a member of the Joint Center for Urban Studies. During the years 1963-1964 he travelled through Europe, the Middle East and Asia preparing studies of cave architecture which were later published in the essay of 1980 which won him the Comité International des Critiques d’Architecture prize. In 1963 he was a teacher of architecture at the Rhode Island School of Design. In 1965 he founded, with Paul Maymont, Yona Friedman and Michel Ragon, the Groupe International d'Architecture Prospective (GIAP). He is considered to have been a pioneer of Megastructural architecture. He taught in Aquila and Rome; he was full professor of architectural composition in Palermo from 1980 and in Rome from 1988.

His engagement in studies on the architecture of Art Nouveau brought him to the rediscovery of the work of the Italian architect Raimondo D'Aronco, regarding whom he wrote the first monograph dedicated to his drawings and architecture in 1955, which was followed by a second in 1982.

A founding Partner, together with Luca Nicoletti and Giulia Falconi, of Studio Nicoletti Associati, he was Emeritus professor of Architectural Composition at the Rome La Sapienza University, Vice President of the International Academy of Architecture, Member of the Academy of Architecture of Russia, Member of the International Academy of Architecture of Moscow and member of the Academy of Architecture of France. Honorary Fellow of the American Institute of Architects and of the Royal Architectural Institute of Canada. From the Minister of Culture of France, he received the title of "Commandeur de l'Ordre des Arts et des Lettres". Twice awarded the Dedalo Minosse Prize. His professional experience embraced many aspects of urban and architectural design, especially of public buildings, carried out in Europe, the United States, Africa, the Middle and Far East, where they were integrated with those of specialists in various scientific and technological sectors.

Part of his artistic and architectural archives is entrusted to the collections of FRAC Fonds régional d'art contemporain and the New National Museum of Monaco, both located in France; while the majority is entrusted to the collection of CSAC Centro Studi e Archivio della Comunicazione | Università degli Studi di Parma.

== Main projects ==
- Social Housing, Rieti (1965)
- Artificial Peninsula in Fontvieille, Principauté de Monaco (1968)
- Helicoidal Skyscraper, New York (1968)
- Airport of Reggio Calabria (1974)
- Seafront of Reggio Calabria (1976)
- Social Housing, Gela (1976)
- Urban Plan, Gela (1978)
- Airports of Trapani, Lampedusa and Pantelleria (1978)
- Airport and Control Tower, Catania (1978)
- Moncada House, Bagheria (1987)
- University Campus, Udine (1990)
- General Hospital, Agrigento (1991)
- Urban Plan, Rieti (1992)
- Scientific Greenhouse, University of Catania (2000)
- Zoological Museum, Catania (2000)
- Sport Palace, Palermo (2001)
- Italian Parliament Conference Centre, Roma (2002)
- Police Headquarters, Rieti (2002)
- Millennium Park, Abuja Nigeria (2003)
- New Courthouse, Lecce (2004)
- Unità d’Italia Square, Rieti (2004)
- New Courthouse of Arezzo, Arezzo (2008)
- Kazakhstan Central Concert Hall, Astana Kazakhstan (2009)
- Millennium Tower, Abuja, Nigeria U.C. (expected 2014)
- Petaling Jaya "The Pod" Pavilion, Kuala Lumpur Malaysia (2010)
