= Palace of Peace and Reconciliation =

Landmark event venue and spiritual centre in Astana

- Бейбітшілік және келісім сарайы
- Interactive map of the Palace of Peace and Reconciliation area
- Alternative names: Pyramid of Peace and Accord

General information
- Status: Completed
- Architectural style: High-tech; Postmodern
- Location: Astana, Kazakhstan, Tauelsizdik Ave., 57, Astana, Kazakhstan
- Coordinates: 51°7′23″N 71°27′49″E
- Construction started: 2004
- Completed: 2006
- Inaugurated: September 1, 2006
- Owner: City of Astana

Height
- Roof: 62 m (203 ft)

Technical details
- Floor area: 28,000 m^{2} (300,000 sq ft)

Design and construction
- Architect: Norman Foster
- Architecture firm: Foster and Partners
- Structural engineer: Buro Happold
- Other designers: Brian Clarke

The Palace of Peace and Reconciliation (Kazakh: Бейбітшілік пен келісім сарайы, Beibıtşılık pen kelısım saraiy), also translated as the Pyramid of Peace and Accord, is a 62-metre-high (203 ft) pyramid in Astana, the capital of Kazakhstan, that serves as a non-denominational national spiritual centre and event venue. Designed by architectural practice Foster and Partners and developed in partnership with Aldar Properties, the Palace is surmounted by a modern stained glass apex by architectural artist Brian Clarke. The Palace was constructed to house the triennial Congress of Leaders of World and Traditional Religions, and completed in 2006.

== History ==
The Palace was designed by architectural firm Foster and Partners and developed in partnership with Aldar Properties. Built by Sembol Construction at a cost of 8.74 billion Kazakh tenge (approx. $58 million), the project was conceived as a permanent venue for the Congress of Leaders of World and Traditional Religions, which meets triennially in a purpose-built conference chamber at the apex of the pyramid. In 2011 and 2013, the International Astana Action Film Festival was held in the Palace.

== Structure ==
The pyramidical portion of the building is 62 metres high and sits on a 15-metre-high (49 ft) earth-covered block. All of this construction is above ground level. Though the landscaping of the Presidential Park rises up to cover the lower levels, these are not basements.

The structure is made up of five "stories" of triangles, each of which is 12m in length per side. The lower portion, made of three "stories" of triangles, is clad in pale granite. The upper two rows of triangles, four triangles per side, are clad in 9700 square feet of modern stained glass, an artwork by architectural artist Brian Clarke which forms the glazed apex, and incorporates ceramic glaze screen-printed imagery of pigeons in flight, as do the twenty eight diamond-shaped stained glass windows on the four sides of the lower level of the building, which total 1076 square feet.

Construction is of a steel frame for the pyramid structure, and concrete for the lower levels. The engineers had to design the building to withstand expansion and contraction due to temperature variations of over 80 °C, from -40 to over 40 °C - leading to an expansion of the building of up to 30 cm. Due to the extreme climate of the city, the engineers locked down one corner of the pyramid, and placed the three other corners on bridge bearings, a common technique for building bridges, but used in a building for the first time.

The Pyramid contains accommodations for different religions, including Judaism, Islam, Christianity, Buddhism, Hinduism, Daoism, and other faiths. It also houses a 1,300-seat opera house, a national museum of culture, a new "university of civilization", a library and a research center for Kazakhstan's ethnic and geographical groups. This diversity is unified within the pure form of a pyramid, 62 m (203 ft) high with a 62x62m (203x203ft) base. The building is conceived as a global center for religious understanding, the renunciation of violence and the promotion of faith and human equality.

The Pyramid of Peace expresses the spirit of Kazakhstan, where cultures, traditions and representatives of various nationalities coexist in peace, harmony and accord. Bathed in the golden and pale blue glow of the stained glass (colors taken from the Kazakhstan flag), 200 delegates from the world's main religions and faith meet every three years in a circular chamber based on the United Nations Security Council meeting room in New York.

The building was designed by the British architects Foster and Partners (lead design). Turkish architectural firm Tabanlıoğlu Architects undertook construction information packages for the Foster design; engineers Buro Happold undertook lead structural and services design.

== Gallery ==
A night view of the Pyramid of Peace.

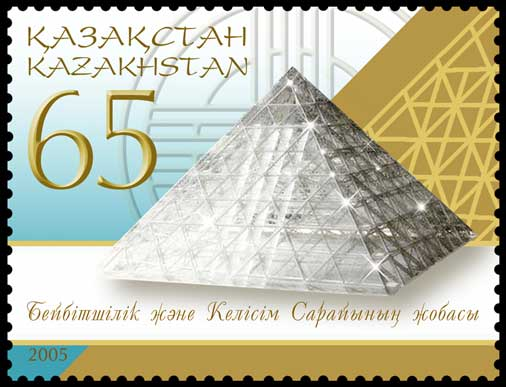
The palace on a 2005 Kazakh Stamp.

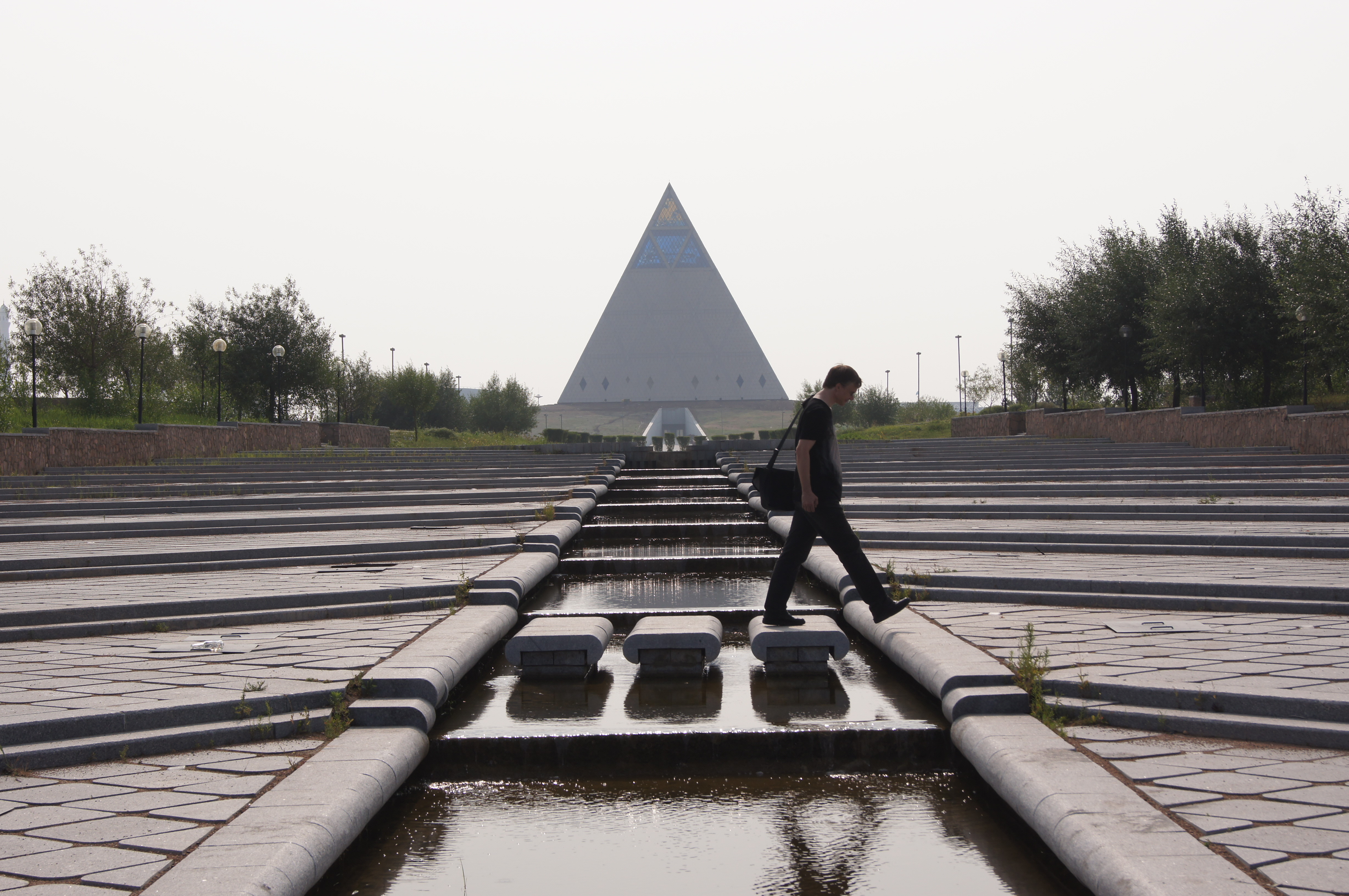

Internal view of the stained glass apex, through the central congress table.

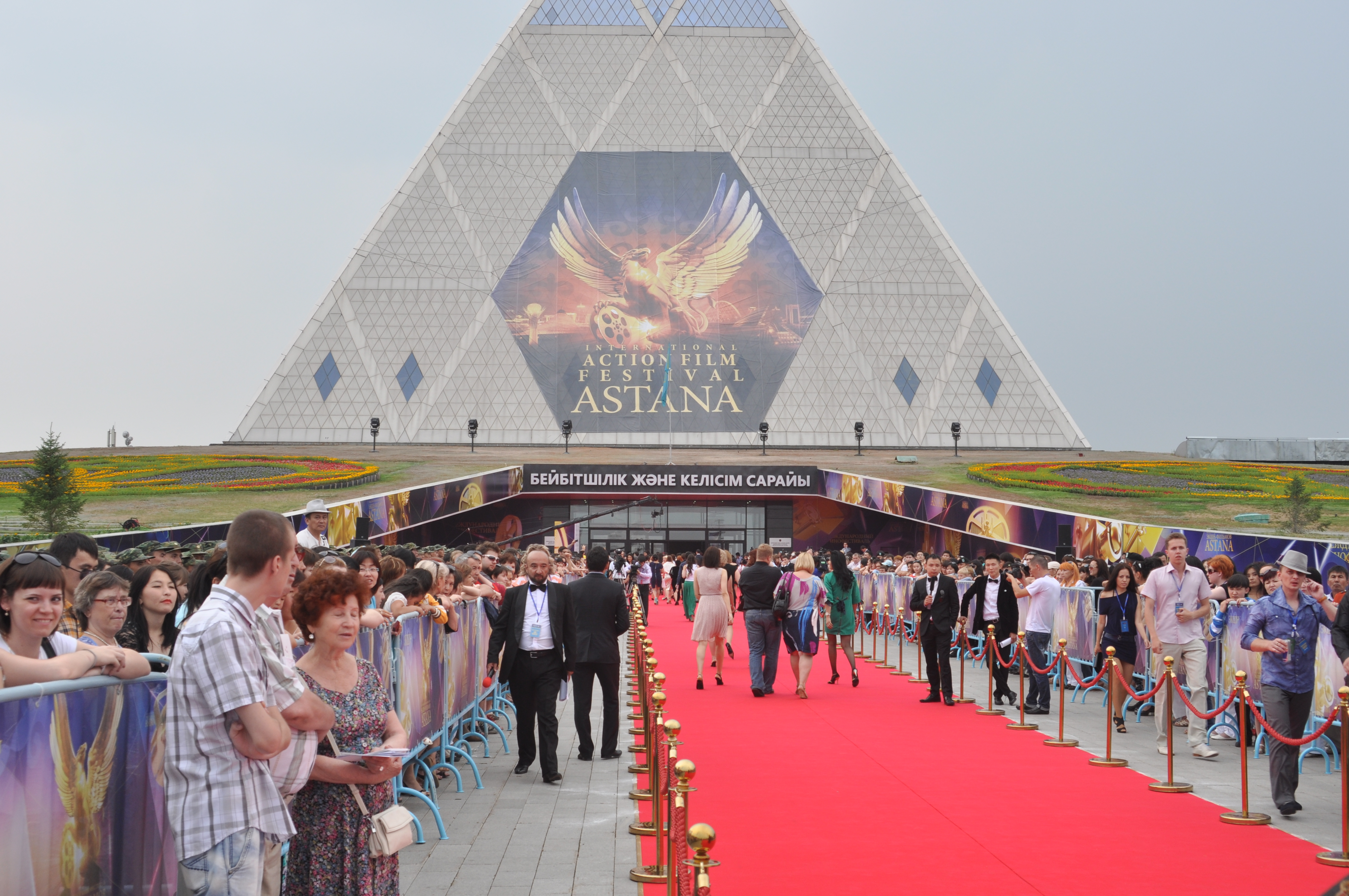
Red carpet during the International Astana Action Film Festival.

Main entrance of the Palace of Peace and Reconciliation

== See also ==
- Congress of Leaders of World and Traditional Religions
