= Congress of Leaders of World and Traditional Religions =

Interfaith congress held in Kazakhstan

The Congress of Leaders of World and Traditional Religions (Kazakh: Әлемдік және дәстүрлі діндер лидерлерінің съезі; Russian: Съезд лидеров мировых и традиционных религий) is an international interfaith forum held once every three years in Astana, Kazakhstan. It was initiated by Kazakhstan's first president, Nursultan Nazarbayev. The Congress seeks to foster mutual recognition among religious leaders and facilitate their constructive cooperation in addressing social, cultural, and religious issues.

The Congress is regularly attended by representatives of Islam, Christianity, Judaism, Buddhism, Hinduism, Shinto, Taoism and other religions, as well as by politicians and heads of international organisations. Each Congress adopts a final declaration, which Kazakhstan circulates at the United Nations General Assembly.

== History ==
=== Origins ===
The Congress emerged in the wake of the September 11 attacks on the United States in 2001 and Pope John Paul II's second "Spirit of Assisi" meeting in 2002. Nazarbayev put forward the idea on 13 February 2003 at the International Conference of Peace and Accord, attended by representatives of Christian, Muslim and Jewish organisations. He envisaged a dialogue between heads of faiths, built on trust, as a permanent mechanism for reconciling religious positions on pressing global problems. The stated aims of the Congress were to search for universal human values in world and traditional religions and to establish a permanent international interfaith institution for dialogue and joint decision-making.

The initiative drew on Kazakhstan's model of interethnic and interfaith accord: the country is home to more than 100 ethnic groups and about 4,000 religious associations representing 18 faiths. The Congress has grown from 17 delegations at the first meeting to more than 100 delegations, including Pope Francis, at the seventh.

== Congresses ==
=== 1st Congress (2003) ===
The first Congress was held in Astana on 23–24 September 2003. It was attended by 17 delegations; The Astana Times puts the number of countries at 23, while Kazinform gives 13. The forum focused mainly on countering terrorism and extremism. Participants decided to create a permanent working body, the Secretariat of the Congress.

=== 2nd Congress (2006) ===
The second Congress, chaired by Nazarbayev, was held in Astana on 12–13 September 2006 and was attended by delegations from 29 countries. It took place in a new building constructed for the event, the Palace of Peace and Reconciliation, a pyramid designed by the British architect Norman Foster. The central topic of discussion was "Religion, Society and International Security".

The Congress was recognised in the Congressional Record by Congressman Ben Chandler of Kentucky, who called Kazakhstan "a model of religious diversity". The forum adopted a joint declaration calling on representatives of all religions to resolve conflicts through peaceful dialogue.

=== 3rd Congress (2009) ===
The third Congress was held in Astana on 1–2 July 2009. About 400 delegates representing 77 delegations from 35 countries attended. Its central theme was "The role of religious leaders in building a world based on tolerance, mutual respect and cooperation". The same year a Council of Religious Leaders was established on Nazarbayev's initiative.

=== 4th Congress (2012) ===
The fourth Congress took place in Astana on 30–31 May 2012. It was attended by 85 delegations from 40 countries, and its central theme was "Peace and Harmony as the Choice of Mankind". The first meeting of the Council of Religious Leaders was held within the framework of the forum.

=== 5th Congress (2015) ===
The fifth Congress was held in Astana on 10–11 June 2015 with Nazarbayev's participation, under the theme "Dialogue of Religious Leaders and Politicians in the Name of Peace and Development". It was attended by 80 delegations from 42 countries, as well as UN Secretary-General Ban Ki-moon, King Abdullah II of Jordan and President of Finland Sauli Niinistö. During the Congress Nazarbayev met Ban Ki-moon and Abdullah II, and proposed including several appeals in the final declaration, among them a call to end armed conflicts. The declaration was circulated as an official document of the UN General Assembly.

=== 6th Congress (2018) ===
The sixth Congress was held in Astana on 10–11 October 2018 under the theme "Religious Leaders for a Safe World". 82 delegations from 46 countries took part. The forum held two plenary sessions and four breakout sessions, on themes including "Manifesto. The World. The 21st Century as a Concept of Global Security", "Religions in the Changing Geopolitics: New Opportunities for Mankind's Consolidation", "Religion and Globalization: Challenges and Responses" and "Religious Leaders and Political Figures in Overcoming Extremism and Terrorism".

Nazarbayev opened the Congress on 10 October and outlined his vision for the role of technology in spreading the message of peace. He proposed creating an information portal based on the Congress. It was the last Congress held during his presidency; he resigned in 2019.

=== 7th Congress (2022) ===
The seventh Congress was held in Nur-Sultan (now Astana) on 14–15 September 2022. More than 100 delegations from about 60 countries attended. Pope Francis attended in person, describing his visit as a "pilgrimage of dialogue and peace". According to Reuters, the Pope sought a meeting with Xi Jinping while both were in Kazakhstan, but the Chinese side declined. Opening the Congress, President Kassym-Jomart Tokayev called it one of the key global formats of inter-civilisational dialogue. The final declaration, consisting of a preamble and 35 paragraphs, was submitted to the UN General Assembly.

=== 8th Congress (2025) ===
The eighth Congress was held in Astana on 17–18 September 2025 under the theme "Dialogue of Religions: Synergy for the Future". It brought together religious representatives from more than 60 countries, including Patriarch Kirill of Moscow. The Congress adopted the "Astana Declaration of Peace – 2025".

== List of congresses ==
No.	Dates	Theme or notes
I	23–24 September 2003	Secretariat of the Congress established
II	12–13 September 2006	"Religion, Society and International Security"; first Congress in the Palace of Peace and Reconciliation
III	1–2 July 2009	"The role of religious leaders in building a world based on tolerance, mutual respect and cooperation"
IV	30–31 May 2012	"Peace and Harmony as the Choice of Mankind"; first meeting of the Council of Religious Leaders
V	10–11 June 2015	"Dialogue of Religious Leaders and Politicians in the Name of Peace and Development"
VI	10–11 October 2018	"Religious Leaders for a Safe World"
VII	14–15 September 2022	Attended by Pope Francis
VIII	17–18 September 2025	"Dialogue of Religions: Synergy for the Future"

== Structure ==
Between congresses, the work is carried out by the Secretariat of the Congress, established by decision of the first Congress, and by the Council of Religious Leaders. Organisational support is provided by the International Centre for Interfaith and Interreligious Dialogue (formerly the Nursultan Nazarbayev Centre for the Development of Interfaith and Inter-civilisational Dialogue).
