= Helicoidal Skyscraper =

Planned skyscraper in New York City

Coordinates: 40.702°N 74.012°W

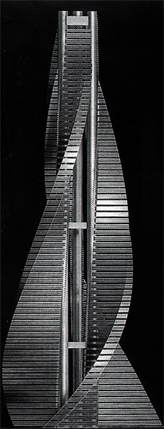
- The New York Crescent Project
- Interactive map of the Helicoidal Skyscraper area

General information
- Status: Never built
- Location: New York City

Height
- Antenna spire: 565 m (1,854 ft)

Design and construction
- Architect: Manfredi Nicoletti
- Structural engineer: Sergio Musmeci

The Helicoidal Skyscraper was a planned but never materialized, 565 m (1,854 ft) high business center that was to have been built on the tip of Manhattan, New York City. It was a stillborn project developed between 1968 and 1974 by Italian architect Manfredi Nicoletti. It combined its aerodynamic shape with the technology of wired bridges, for the purpose of minimizing both the loads and structural bulk.

== Concept ==
Structural studies have been conducted by Italian engineer Sergio Musmeci. The building's structure concept is based on the body of a mammal and it explores the route of the maximum reduction of wind pressures and structural bulkiness. Particularly, it was inspired by the mammal's limb, with its compressed central bone - external tensioned muscle.

The central nucleus in steel and cement is compressed and made up of three interconnected cylindrical trunks which house all the vertical systems. Anchored to this nucleus are a group of trunks wired in steel which keep the external strips in traction where the latticed structures of the attics are located, which compress themselves towards the nucleus and collaborates with the overall static system.

The wind pressure is minimized by the helix shape made by the trunks in the skyscraper, described by the three sails made by the overlapping of the habitable floors which revolve around the central trunk creating in planimetry a growing movement based on the golden spiral. The form reacts to the action of the wind, whatever direction it comes from, in a uniform and dissipative way. The result is the elimination of two of the main negative phenomena vis-à-vis the typology of skyscrapers: the excess static caused by the asymmetry of traditional structures of rectangular design, where the pressure of the wind is highest on the long side and lowest on the short one and the Von Karman effect typical of cylindrical structures which provokes a sinusoidal whirlwind and consequently lateral pulsating forces. The helicoidal shape, on the other hand, splits up the force of the wind in resistance, leeway and lift. In that way, the lift does not have an influence on the stability and decreases the weight transmitted to the foundations.

The project extrapolates two typologies from areas never associated with buildings of great height: the twisting shape of the ship sail that escapes the wind and minimises its pressure, and the structure of the cable bridge that results in a significant saving of materials by collaborating the horizontal scaffolding with the rods and the supports.

== Sustainable Design ==
The Helicoidal Skyscraper can be considered a sustainable building or an example of the green architecture concept due to several aspects of its design. As a tall building, for instance, it addresses the energy problem by minimising the quantities of materials needed for its construction. Also, its unique logarithmic spiral would have reacted to the wind with a vertical force that drives it upwards, taking with the air pollution - out from the streets below. It avoids the capability of most tall buildings to serve as obstructions that affect the atmospheric circulation and the dispersion of pollutants. There is an expectation of the so-called "chimney effect," which eliminates the creation of an unpleasant micro-climate and the accumulation of pollution in the lower strata of the urban atmosphere by increasing the conviction currents created by the thermal distribution of solar heat on the external surfaces of the tower.

The building avoids structural redundancy, which leads to economic benefits. This is attributed to the adoption of a circular polar diagram that allows the edifice to receive wind in a generally uniform manner from any direction. Therefore, it is not subject to critical conditions caused by specific wind directions that can create excess load.
