= International Astana Action Film Festival =

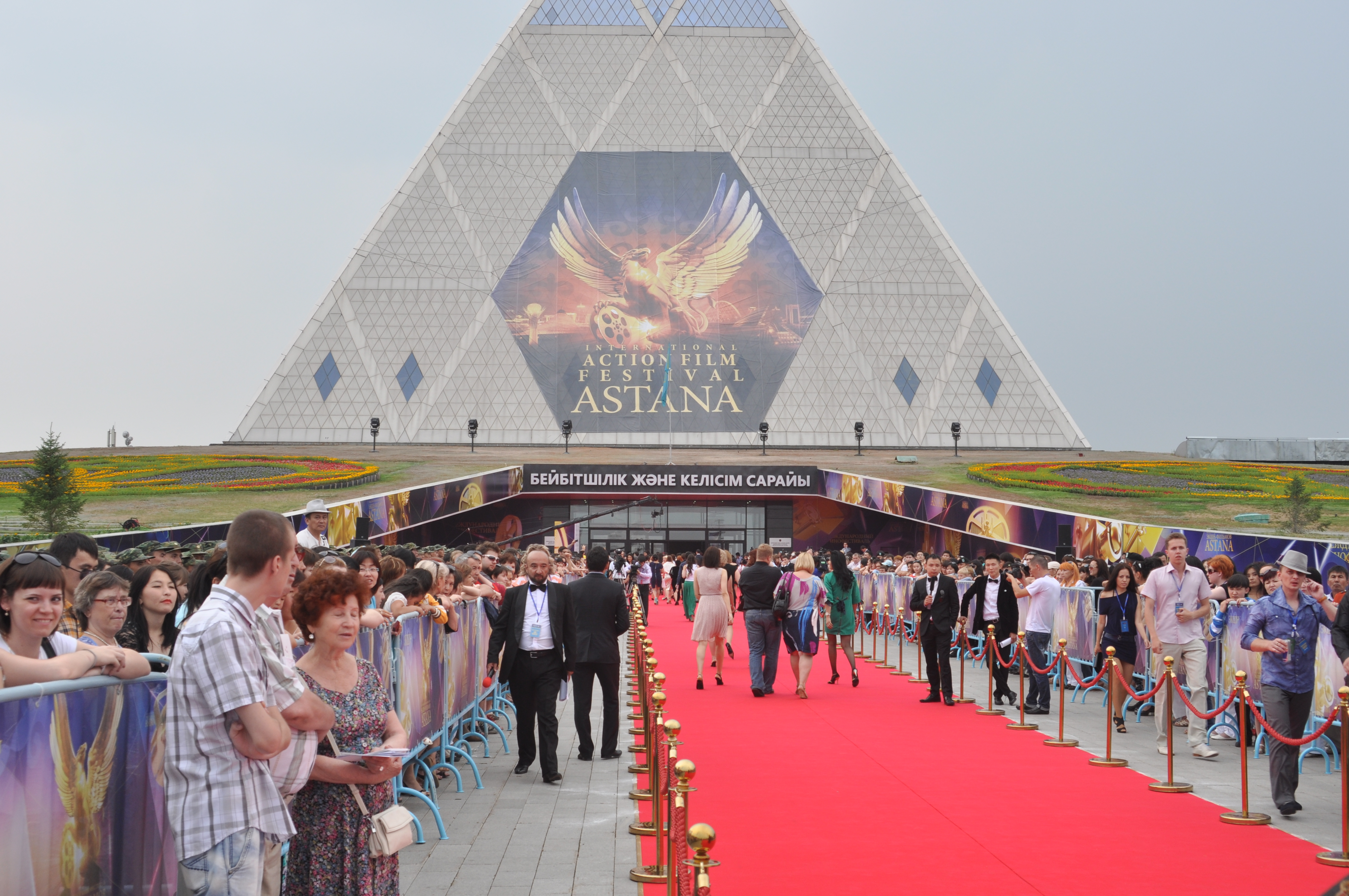
Red carpet of the festival

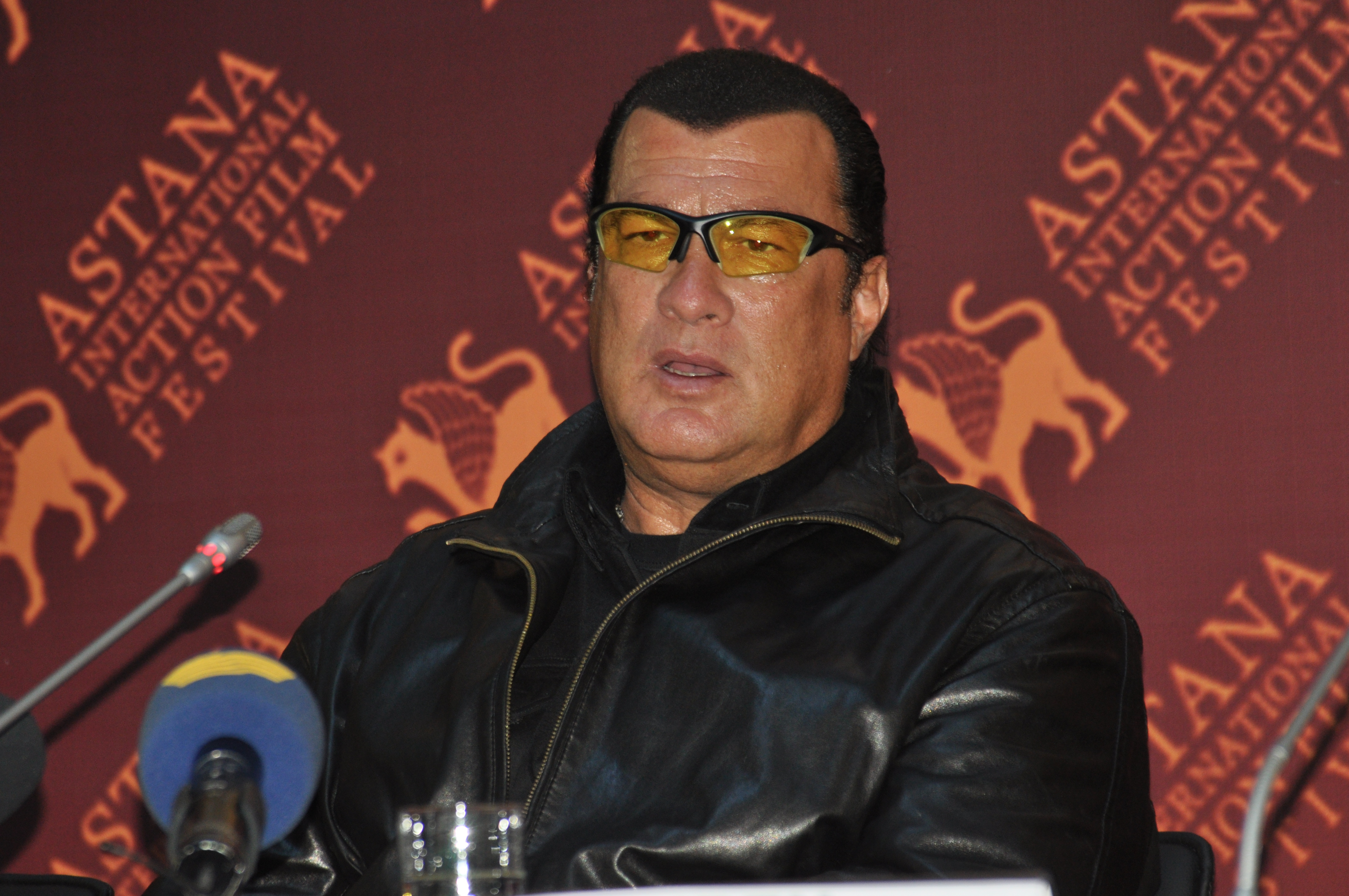
Steven Seagal at the press-conference of the Second Astana Action Film Festival

International Astana Action Film Festival (Russian: Международный кинофестиваль экшн-фильмов "Astana", translit. Mezhdunarodniy kinofestival action filmov «Astana») is significant as the only festival of the action film genre. The festival has been held annually in July in Astana, the capital of Kazakhstan, since 2010. The founder and President of the Astana Action Film Festival is renowned Kazakh director, screenwriter and producer Timur Bekmambetov, and the general director of the festival is Iren Vanidovskaya.

Unlike many other film festivals, Astana Festival has no juries who choose best film or best actor. This festival, first of all, is a platform for the youth filmmakers to implement their creative potential and to share experiences.

== History ==
The festival takes place annually on the eve of the capital of Kazakhstan's anniversary. Organizers of the event is the management of the Astana Film Festival with the support of the Astana Mayor's Office and Bazelevs Company.

- First International Astana Action Film Festival was held from June 27 till July 1, 2010 in the Kazakhstan Central Concert Hall. It was visited by such celebrities, as Dolph Lundgren, Harvey Weinstein, Hilary Swank, Mike Tyson, Sharlto Copley and many others. But the main achievement of the first festival became a film project of Apollo 18 of the young American screenwriter Brian Miller, the winner of a screenplay competition. This movie was released in September 2011, it was directed by Gonzalo López-Gallego, and produced by Timur Bekmambetov and Ron Schmidt.
- Second International Astana Action Film Festival was held from July 1 to 5, year 2011 in the Palace of Peace and Reconciliation (Pyramid). Steven Seagal, Armand Assante, Michael Madsen and Michelle Rodriguez were among other famous faces from Hollywood, Russia and Kazakhstan on the red carpet at the opening gala night of this year festival.
- Third International Action Film Festival was held in the Palace of Peace and Reconciliation from July 1 to 3, 2012 and gathered in Astana such celebrities as an actor Vincent Cassel, directors Kevin Reynolds and Kang Je-gyu, producers Jim Lemley and Dany Wolf and others. This festival was dedicated to the superhero themes, and the students from the leading Asian cinematography academies, who specially came to Kazakhstan to take part in the ART FEST contest, during three festival days, were creating their own superhero of Astana.

== Program ==
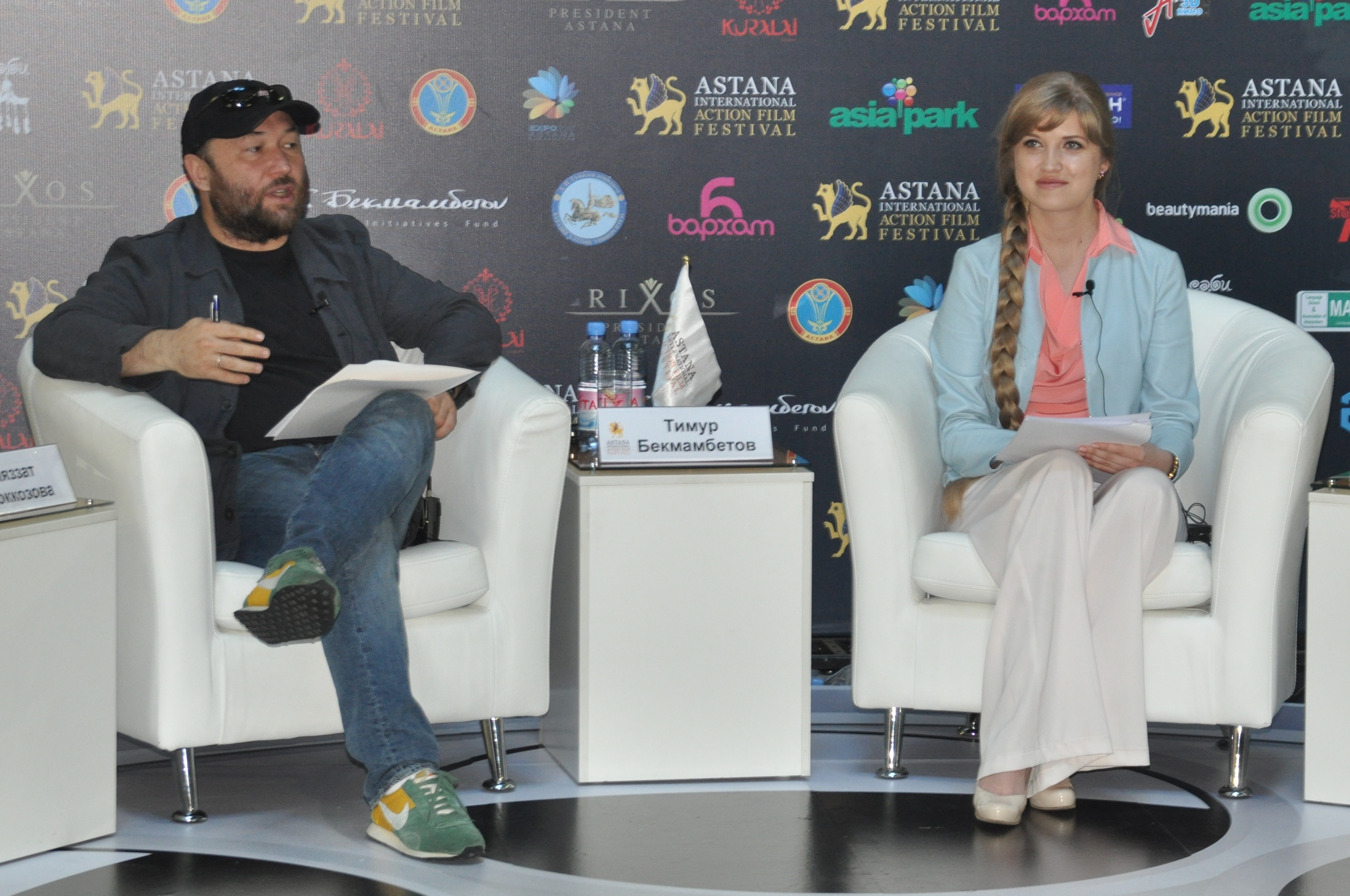
Festival President Timur Bekmambetov and General Director Iren Vanidovskaya

The official festival program includes over 20 non-competitive full-length action films made in the US, Europe, Asia, and the CIS. For the festival days viewers and the mass media are able to watch popular movies, films, which have never been released in Kazakhstan and CIS before, and visit the pre-premiere screenings of the new films of the year. The entire festival program divided into different sections with such headings as, for example, world action, documentary action or superhero movies.

== Festival competitions ==
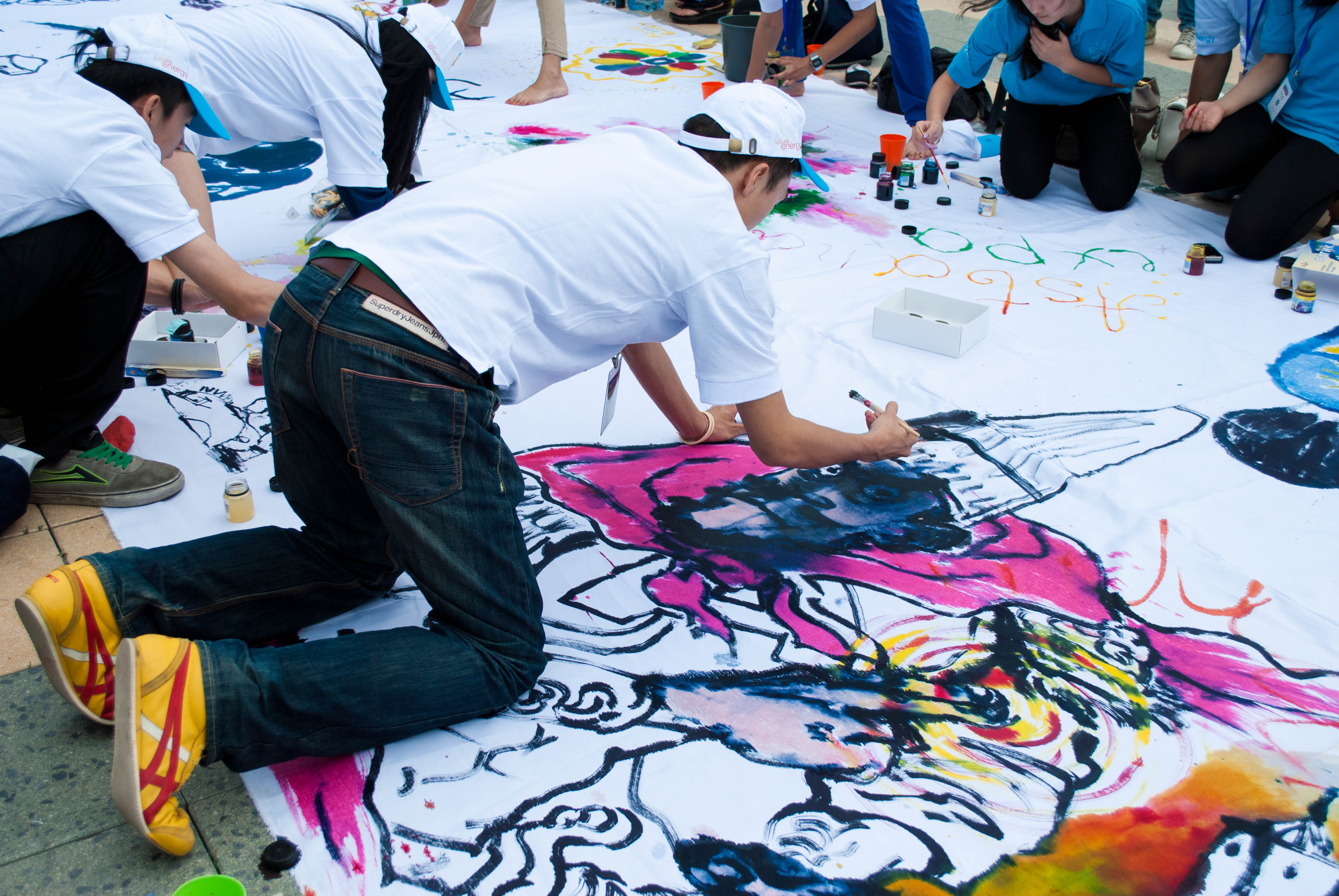
participants of the ART FEST contest are creating a superhero of Astana

The Screenplay Competition is a traditional Astana Action Film Festival contest for the professional and amateur screenwriters from all over the world. The author of the best script receives ten thousand dollars as a prize and a chance to work under this project together with Timur Bekmambetov's production company Bazelevs.

In 2012 festival organizers established two more contests: Short Film Competition, when the best movies of the participants are included in the festival film program as a Short Films Night, and a Youth ART FEST Competition. Usually, there are several competitions in cinematography sphere, such as best animation, costume, one-day video or comic-book contests, all under the Youth ART FEST, where the delegates from Asia and Kazakhstan take part.
