= Presidential Park =

Recreational area

- Президенттік саябақ
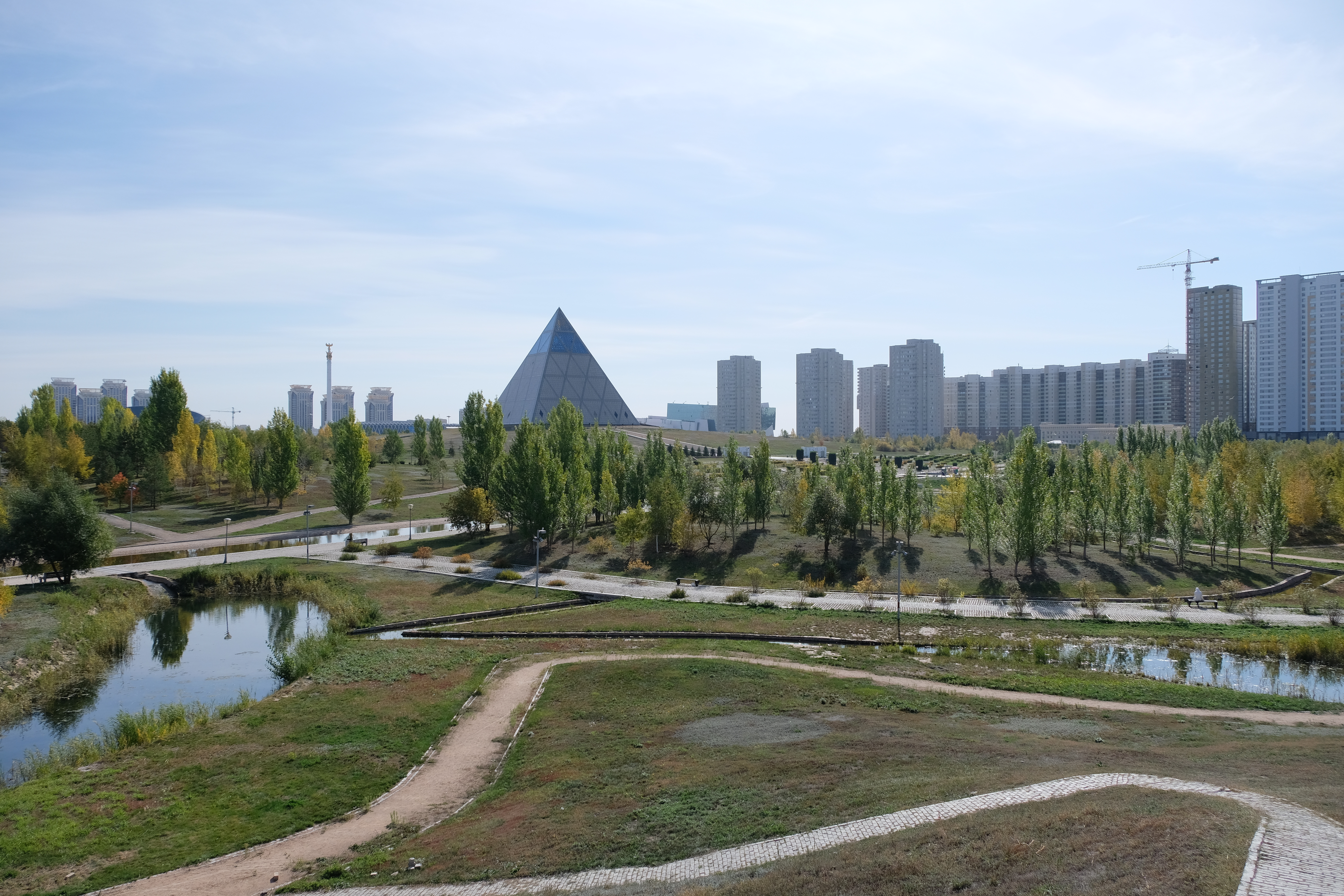
- Interactive map of Presidential Park
- Location: Astana, Kazakhstan
- Coordinates: 51°07′26″N 71°27′29″E
- Area: 80 hectares (200 acres)
- Established: 2008

The Presidential Park (Kazakh: Президенттік саябақ, romanized: Prezidenttık saiabaq; Russian: Президентский парк, romanized: Prezidentskyy park) is one of the largest urban parks in Astana. Built in 2008 at the 10th anniversary of the Capital City Day, it is located right behind the Ak Orda Presidential Palace and across the Ishim river. It is the site of the Palace of Peace and Reconciliation with flower beds and trees occupying most of the territory. From the north side the park is bordered by Baitursynov Street and from the south by Najimedenov Street.

The park is surrounded by multi-story residential buildings and it's artificial stream with fountains is shaped as the Simurgh, a bird symbol of Kazakhstan's independence.
