= Maitama =

District in Abuja, Nigeria

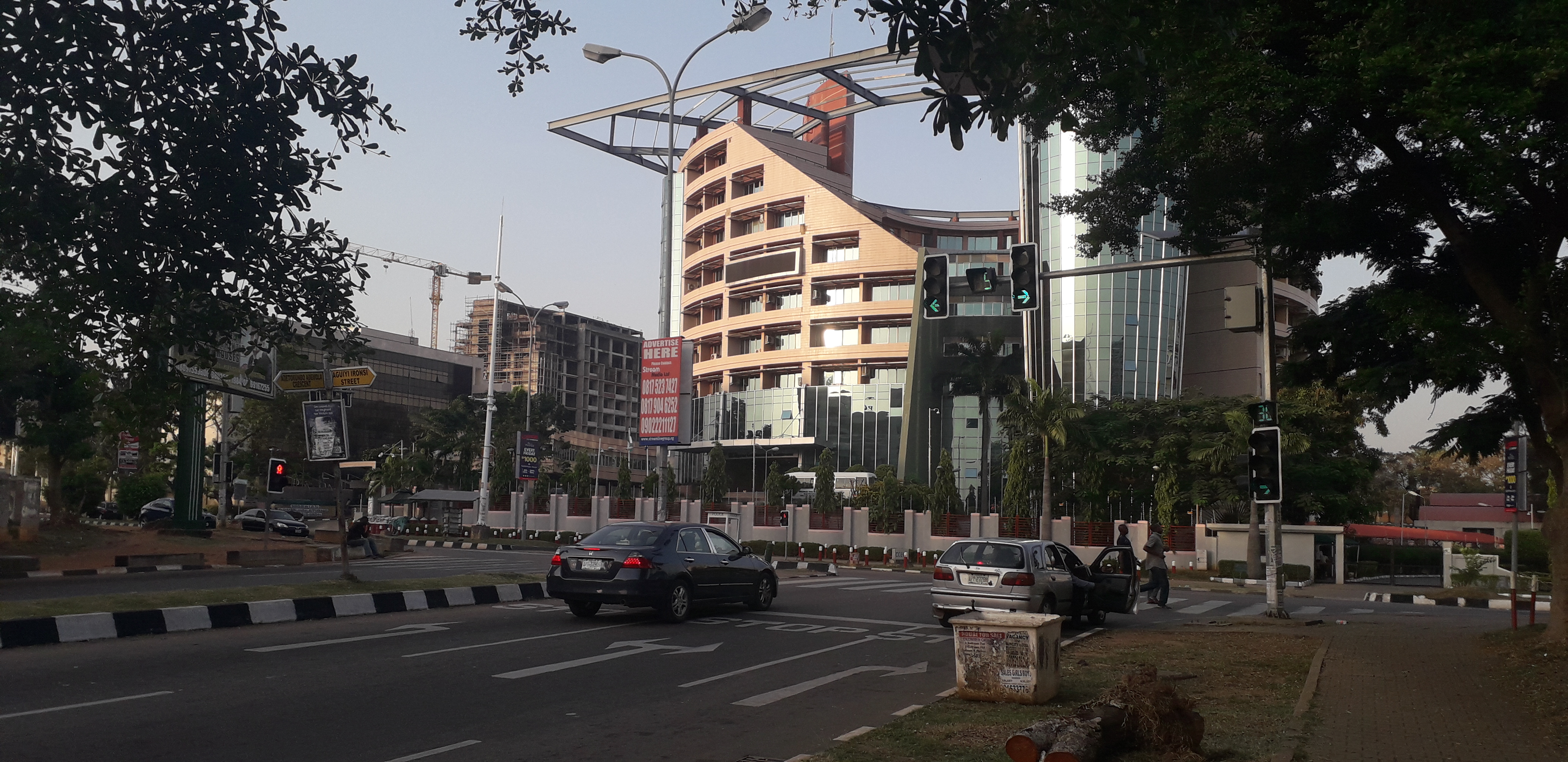
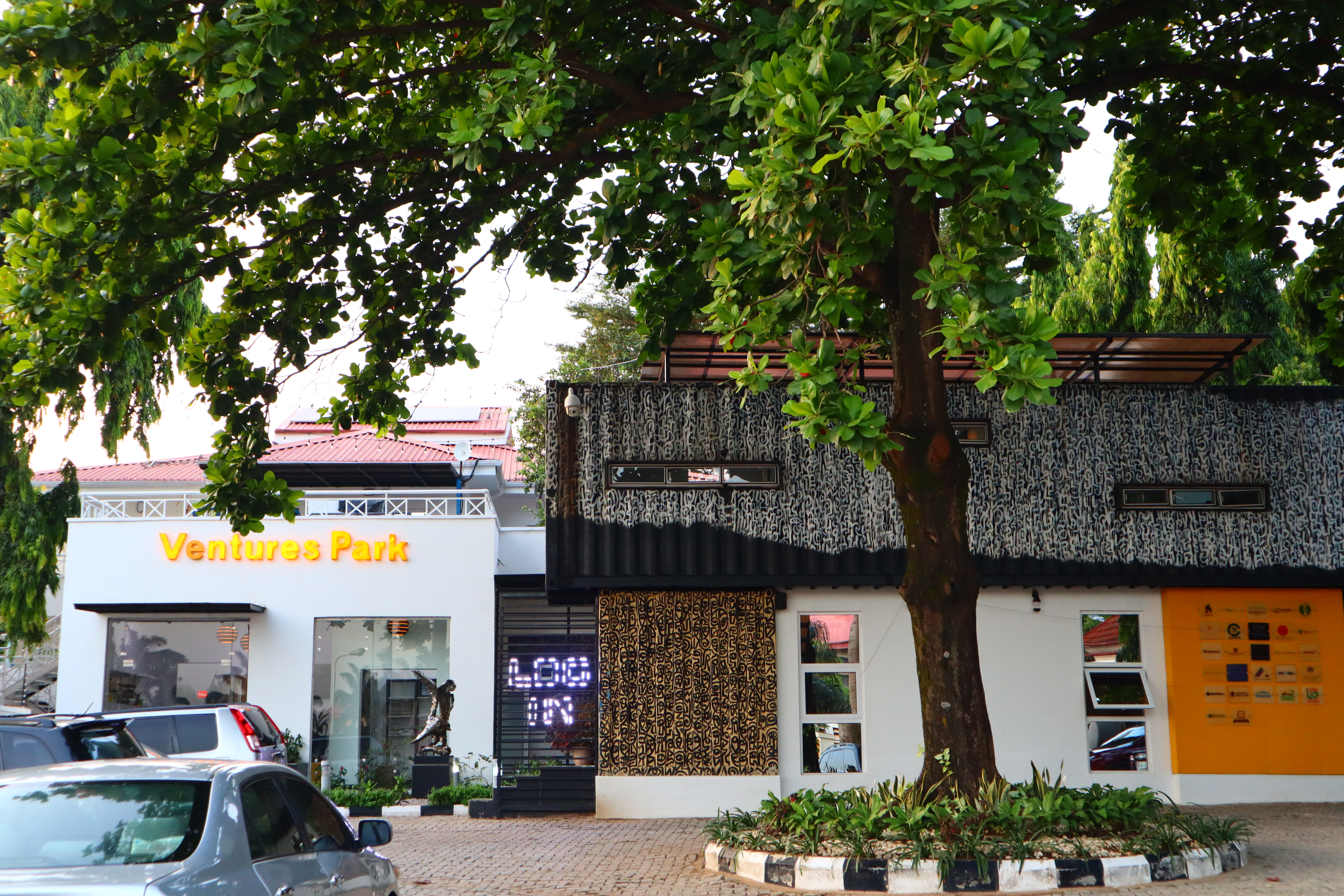
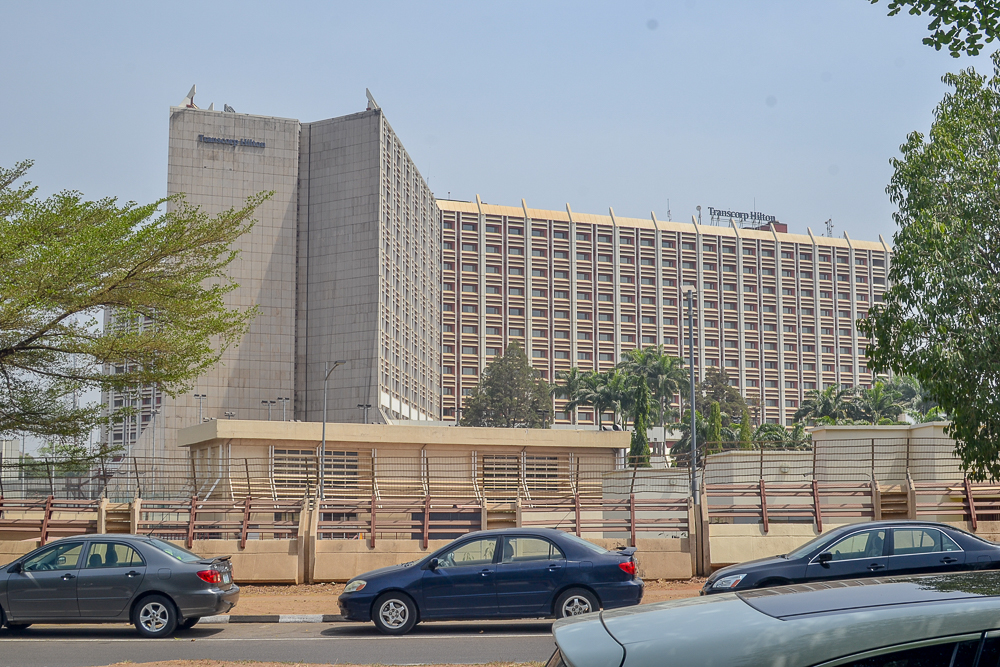
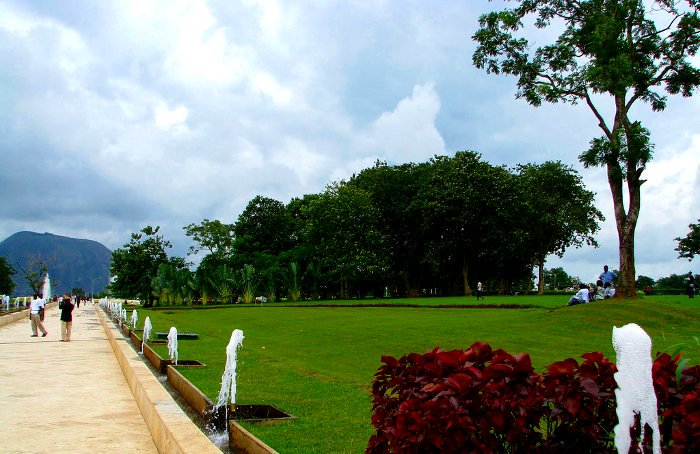
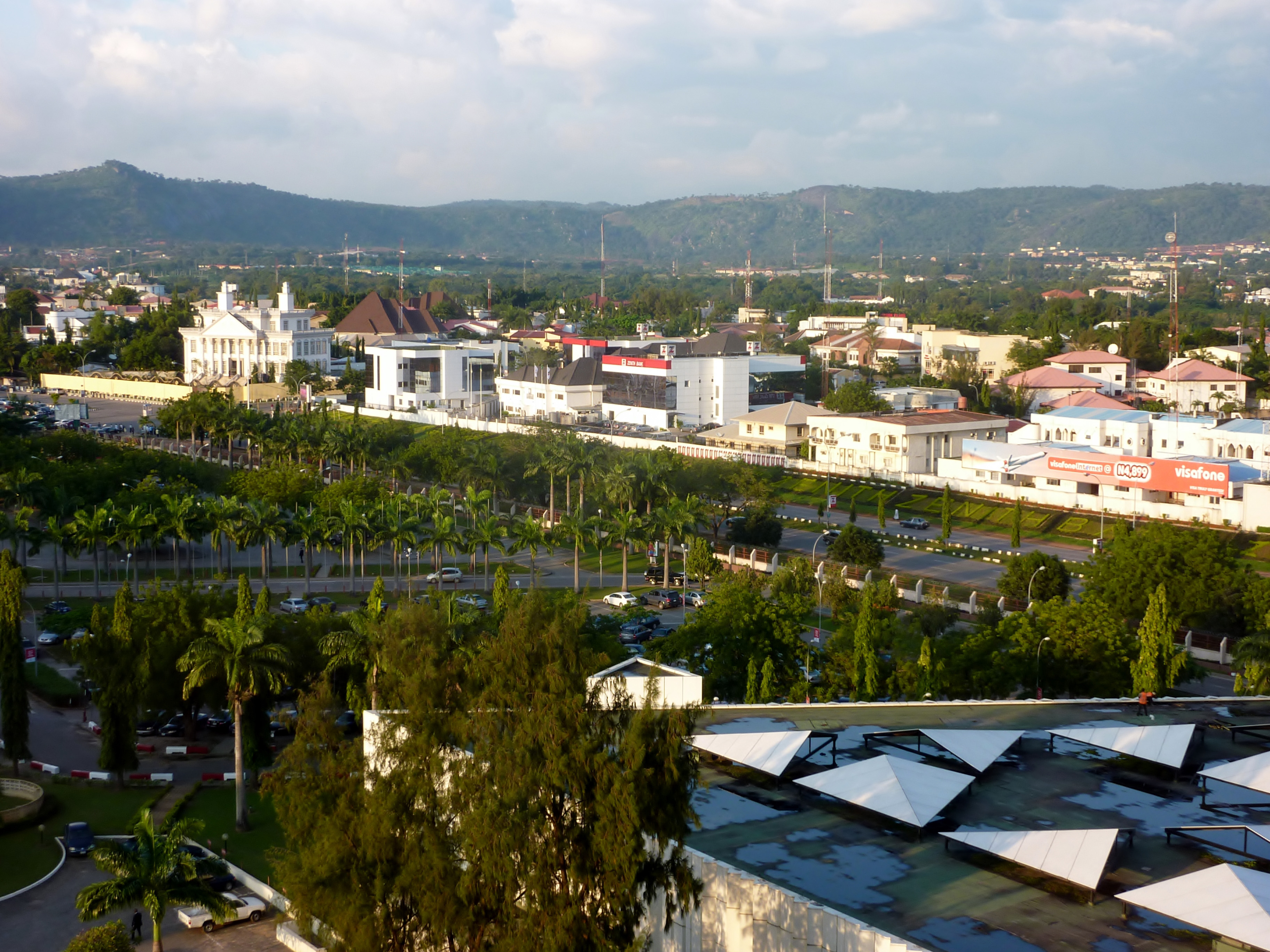
- From the top left; Top: The headquarters of the Nigerian Communications Commission and Ventures Park workspace hub; Middle: Transcorp Hilton hotel and the Millennium Park; Bottom: a view of a street in Maitama
- Interactive map of Maitama
- Coordinates: 9°5′4.164″N 7°29′30.1344″E
- Country: Nigeria
- Federal territory: Federal Capital Territory
- Federal capital: Abuja
- First settled: 1715
- Incorporated: 1 October 1984

Government
  - Body: Federal Capital Territory Administration

Maitama is a district in Phase 1 of Abuja, the capital city of Nigeria. The district hosts various foreign embassies, high commissions, and governmental buildings. It houses several of Abuja's most well known landmarks, such as the Millennium Park, Minister's Hill, the Unity Fountain, the IBB Golf Club, and the Transcorp Hilton. Maitama is home to the headquarters of the NCC, NCS, NUC, AMCON, NSIA, NIPC, NEPC, CAC, NYSC, RMRDC, NHRC, TETFUND, INEC, NEMA, TCN and other parastatals.

The district is situated to the north of Abuja, with the Wuse and Central Districts lying to its southwest and southeast respectively. Due to its rapid growth, the district is currently undergoing further extension as of 2023.

== History ==
The earliest known settlers to Maitama were the Koro people, who traced their migration from Likoro near Zaria back to 1715. Under the leadership of the then Wambai of Likoro, they migrated to Kagarko before eventually relocating to Maitama. The name Maitama is believed to have originated from the mining and iron smelting activities that were prevalent in the settlement. A fatal landslide in the mining pit forced them to abandon Maitama and establish a new settlement named Wuse.
