= ISO 639:f =

List of ISO 639-3 language codes starting with F

This is a list of ISO 639-3 language codes starting with F.

Index | a | b | c | d | e | f | g | h | i | j | k | l | m | n | o | p | q | r | s | t | u | v | w | x | y | z

Abbreviations are used in the table as follows:

- Scope: I = individual language, M = macrolanguage, S = special code
- Type: C = constructed, E = extinct (in recent times), H = historical (distinct from its modern form), L = living, S = special code

Deprecated codes are enclosed in (parentheses).

The column Family contains the generic English name of the language's family or macrolanguage.

ISO 639 codes			Scope/Type	Family	Language names	
639-3	639-1	639-2/B	Scope/Type	Family	Native	ISO name
faa			I/L			Fasu
fab			I/L			Fa d'Ambu
fad			I/L			Wagi
faf			I/L			Fagani
fag			I/L			Finongan
fah			I/L			Baissa Fali
fai			I/L			Faiwol
faj			I/L			Faita
fak			I/L			Fang (Cameroon)
fal			I/L			South Fali
fam			I/L			Fam
fan		fan	I/L		Fang	Fang (Equatorial Guinea)
fao	fo	fao	I/L	Indo-European	føroyskt	Faroese
fap			I/L			Paloor
far			I/L			Fataleka
fas	fa	per	M/L	Indo-European	فارسی	Persian
fat		fat	I/L			Fanti
fau			I/L			Fayu
fax			I/L		Fala	Fala
fay			I/L			Southwestern Fars
faz			I/L			Northwestern Fars
fbl			I/L			West Albay Bikol
fcs			I/L			Quebec Sign Language
fer			I/L			Feroge
ffi			I/L	Trans–New Guinea	Minanibai	Foia Foia
ffm			I/L	Niger–Congo		Maasina Fulfulde
fgr			I/L			Fongoro
fia			I/L			Nobiin
fie			I/L			Fyer
fif			I/L	Afro-Asiatic		Faifi
fij	fj	fij	I/L	Austronesian	na vosa Vakaviti	Fijian
fil		fil	I/L	Austronesian	Filipino	Filipino; Pilipino
fin	fi	fin	I/L	Uralic	suomi	Finnish
fip			I/L			Fipa
fir			I/L			Firan
fit			I/L	Uralic	meänkieli	Tornedalen Finnish; Meänkieli
fiw			I/L			Fiwaga
(fiz)			I/L			Izere
fjs			I/L			Fiji Sign Language
fkk			I/L			Kirya-Konzəl
fkv			I/L	Uralic		Kven Finnish
fla			I/L			Kalispel-Pend d'Oreille
flh			I/L			Foau
fli			I/L			Fali
fll			I/L			North Fali
(flm)			I/L			Falam Chin
fln			I/E			Flinders Island
flr			I/L			Fuliiru
fly			I/L			Flaaitaal; Tsotsitaal
fmp			I/L			Fe'fe'
fmu			I/L			Far Western Muria
fnb			I/L	Austronesian		Fanbak
fng			I/L			Fanagalo
fni			I/L			Fania
fod			I/L			Foodo
foi			I/L			Foi
fom			I/L			Foma
fon		fon	I/L		Fɔngbè	Fon
for			I/L			Fore
fos			I/E	Austronesian		Siraya
fpe			I/L			Fernando Po Creole English
fqs			I/L			Fas
fra	fr	fre	I/L	Indo-European	français	French
frc			I/L	Indo-European		Cajun French
frd			I/L			Fordata
(fri)			I/L			Western Frisian
frk			I/H	Indo-European	Fränkisch	Frankish
frm		frm	I/H	Indo-European		Middle French (ca. 1400-1600)
fro		fro	I/H	Indo-European		Old French (842-ca. 1400)
frp			I/L	Indo-European	francoprovensal	Arpitan; Francoprovençal
frq			I/L			Forak
frr		frr	I/L	Indo-European	Nordfriisk	Northern Frisian
frs		frs	I/L	Indo-European		Eastern Frisian
frt			I/L			Fortsenal
fry	fy	fry	I/L	Indo-European	Frysk	Western Frisian
fse			I/L			Finnish Sign Language
fsl			I/L			French Sign Language
fss			I/L			finlandssvenskt teckenspråk; Finland-Swedish Sign Language; suomenruotsalainen viittomakieli
fub			I/L	Niger–Congo		Adamawa Fulfulde
fuc			I/L		Pulaar	Pulaar
fud			I/L			East Futuna
fue			I/L	Niger–Congo		Borgu Fulfulde
fuf			I/L			Pular
fuh			I/L	Niger–Congo		Western Niger Fulfulde
fui			I/L	Niger–Congo		Bagirmi Fulfulde
fuj			I/L			Ko
ful	ff	ful	M/L	Niger–Congo	Fulfulde	Fulah
fum			I/L			Fum
fun			I/L			Fulniô
fuq			I/L	Niger–Congo		Central-Eastern Niger Fulfulde
fur		fur	I/L	Indo-European	furlan	Friulian
fut			I/L			Futuna-Aniwa
fuu			I/L			Furu
fuv			I/L	Niger–Congo		Nigerian Fulfulde
fuy			I/L			Fuyug
fvr			I/L		fòòr	Fur
fwa			I/L			Fwâi
fwe			I/L			Fwe

== Sources ==
- "ISO 639-2 Registration Authority". Library of Congress.
- "ISO 639-3 Registration Authority". SIL International.
- Lewis, M. Paul; Simons, Gary F.; Fennig, Charles D., eds. (2016). "Ethnologue: Languages of the World" (19th ed.). Dallas, Texas: SIL International.
