= Fula alphabets =

Writing systems

The Fula language (Fula: Fulfulde, Pulaar, or Pular) is written primarily in the Latin script, but in some areas and contexts is still written in an older Arabic script called the Ajami script or in the recently invented Adlam script.

== History ==
Around the 10th century, Islam was introduced to the West African Sahel and became the religion of scholars and merchants in cities which traded extensively with North African traders. At the same time as Islam arrived came the Qur'an and the Arabic script, which was studied by West African scholars who learned to read, write and speak Arabic. Along with this, many students going through Koranic education would write down notes in their native languages, usually in the margins of books.

It is known that some Fulani scholars were among the students studying in cities like Timbuktu and Gao, hence it is possible that Fulfulde would have been written down starting in the 16th-17th century. As Islam arrived to the Fulani lands in the 17th and 18th centuries, the Fula jihads created multiple Islamic states in West Africa which converted the population and created a class of literate scholars who would debate, speak, write and read in Fulani. The states of the Imamate of Futa Jallon from 1725 and the Sokoto Caliphate from 1804 were both epicentres of West African scholarship, with poetry, science, history, philosophy, and religion debated in Fulfulde.

This established Ajami, a modified script that was able to write Fulfulde, as the original and more traditional form of writing Fulfulde across all Fula populations.

With the arrival of Christian missionaries and soon after the invasion of European powers, mostly the French and English, came the introduction of the Latin script to Fula-speaking regions of West and Central Africa. Various missionaries, colonial administrators, and scholarly researchers devised various ways of writing Fulfulde with Latin to ease the efforts of European colonisation. There were several sounds that were unfamiliar to European languages, like the implosive b and d, the ejective y, the velar n (in the initial position), prenasalised consonants, and long vowels.

Currently, Latin alphabets are the default for Fulfulde writing, with most nations in West Africa having standardised Latin alphabets that accommodate Fulfulde and/or other languages, for official use and instruction. Various Fula writers such as Amadou Bampate Ba and Alfa Ibrahim Sow wrote and published in Latin alphabets, and is used across a range of publications from national level literacy materials, periodicals and linguistic studies and textbooks.

Major influences on current forms of writing Fula came from decisions made by colonial administrators in Northern Nigeria and the Africa Alphabet. Major UNESCO-sponsored conferences on harmonising Latin-based African orthographies were held in Bamako in 1966 and Niamey in 1978, which included standards for writing Fula. Nevertheless, orthographies differ for the language and its variants in different regions, determined by country level.

== Latin Alphabets ==
=== Standard Orthography ===
There are variations depending on the country's policies or the dialect of Fula used. There are some general rules that were established by UNESCO from earlier conventions:

- Phonemic orthography, meaning that every letter represents one phoneme/sound without silent letters
  - However prenasalised stops are written as two letters, like in ndiyam (water)
  - But nasalised vowels are not written but inferred from context
- Double consonants represent geminate consonants, like in sappu (to wash) and sapu (to fold)
- Double vowels represent the vowel length, like in laamɗo (person)

=== Alphabet Comparison ===
Below is a table showing the few differences between the different orthographies of Fula alphabets.

Comparisons of Different Orthographies for Pular
IPA Sounds	Pulaar Fuuta Tooro	Pular Fuuta Jallon	Fulfulde Massina	Fulfulde Adamawa	Fulfulde Bagirimi	Notes
[ʔ]	'	—	'	'	'	The glottalised stop is present in all variations but Pulaar Futa Jallon, where it is palatised and written out as Ƴ.
[ʄ]	J j	—	Ƴ ƴ	J j	—	Usually represented by J in the dialects the sound appears, except for Massina which doesn't have the [jˤ] phoneme and decided to use Ƴ in here instead.
[q]	—	Ɠ ɠ	—	—	—	Character and phoneme only exists in Pulaar Fuuta Jallon
[ᵐb]	Mb mb	Nb nb	Mb mb	Mb mb	Mb mb	Pulaar Massina and Pulaar Bagirimi don't include the phoneme on their alphabet but instead write it as convention.
[ɲ]	Ñ ñ	Ñ ñ	Ɲ ɲ	Ny ny	N̰ n̰	Ñ and N̰ are influenced from Spanish (through French) while the Nigerian Pan-African Alphabet directly uses Ny
[x]	X x	—	—	X x	—	Only a sound in Fuuta Toro and in Adamawa
[jˤ]	Ƴ ƴ	—	—	Ƴ ƴ	Ƴ ƴ	Ƴ is a character that was agreed upon in the UNESCO conferences, however different dialects have placed it for different phonemes, specifically Pulaar Fuuta Jallon and Pulaar Massina
[ˀj]	—	Ƴ ƴ	—	—	—	Ƴ is a character that was agreed upon in the UNESCO conferences, however different dialects have placed it for different phonemes, specifically Pulaar Fuuta Jallon and Pulaar Massina

=== Pulaar Fuuta Tooro (Senegal, The Gambia, Mauritania) ===
Pulaar Fuuta Tooro is the Fula dialect spoken in Senegal, Gambia, and Southern Mauritania. Its Latin alphabet has been standardised by Senegalese government decrees, the latest of which issued in 2005.

It differs from other alphabets in that it includes diphthongs and prenasalisation in the official list, while other alphabets treat it as an orthographic rule instead of a letter.

Pulaar Latin alphabet
A a	Aa aa	B b	Mb mb	Ɓ ɓ	C c	D d	Nd nd	Ɗ ɗ	E e	Ee ee	F f	G g	Ng ng	H h	I i	Ii ii	J j	Nj nj
[a]	[aː]	[b]	[ᵐb]	[ɓ]	[t͡ʃ]‍~[c]‍	[d]	[ⁿd]	[ɗ]	[e]	[eː]	[f]	[ɡ]	[ᵑɡ]	[h]	[i]	[iː]	[d͡ʒ]~[ɟ]‍	[ᶮd͡ʒ]~[ᶮɟ]
K k	L l	M m	N n	Ñ ñ	Ŋ ŋ	O o	Oo oo	P p	R r	S s	T t	U u	Uu uu	W w	X x	Y y	Ƴ ƴ	’
[k]	[l]	[m]	[n]	[ɲ]	[ŋ]	[o]	[oː]	[p]	[r]	[s]	[t]	[u]	[uː]	[w]	[x]	[j]	[jˤ]	[ʔ]

=== Pular Fuuta Jalon (Guinea) ===
Pular Fuuta Jaloo is the Fula dialect spoken in Guinea. Following independence, the government of Guinea adopted transcription rules for all the languages of Guinea based on the characters and diacritic combinations available on French typewriters from that period. The Guinean languages alphabet was used officially for Guinean indigenous languages until 1989.

A meeting for the reform of the alphabet was established in 1988, and it was decided to adopt an orthography similar to the African reference alphabet which was used elswhere in West Africa. In the case of Pular, this change brought the official orthography in harmony with those used in other countries.

Pular Latin alphabet (Guinea)
A a	B b	Ɓ ɓ	C c	D d	Ɗ ɗ	E e	F f	G g	Ɠ ɠ	H h	Ii	J j	K k	L l	M m
[a]	[b]	[ɓ]	[t͡ʃ]	[d]	[ɗ]	[e]	[f]	[g]	[q]	[h]	[i]	[d͡ʒ]	[k]	[l]	[m]
N n	Nb nb	Nd nd	Ng ng	Nj nj	Ñ ñ	Ŋ ŋ	O o	P p	R r	S s	T t	U u	W w	Y y	Ƴ ƴ
[n]	[ᵐb]	[ⁿd]	[ᵑɡ]	[ᶮd͡ʒ]	[ɲ]	[ŋ]	[o]	[p]	[r]	[s]	[t]	[u]	[w]	[j]	[ˀj]

The pre-1989 alphabet was based on the simple Latin alphabet with digraphs for the sounds particular to Pular as opposed to unique letters. This alphabet is still used by some Pular speakers (in part because it can be typed using commercial keyboards).

Pre-1989 Pular Latin alphabet (Guinea)
A a	B b	Bh bh	D d	Dh dh	Dy dy	E e	F f	G g	Gh gh	H h	Ii	J j	K k	L l	M m	Mb mb
[a]	[b]	[ɓ]	[d]	[ɗ]	[d͡ʒ]	[e]	[f]	[g]	[q]	[h]	[i]	[ʒ]	[k]	[l]	[m]	[ᵐb]
N n	Nd nd	Ndy ndy	Ng ng	Nh nh	Ny ny	O o	P p	R r	S s	T t	Ty ty	U u	W w	Y y	Yh yh	
[n]	[ⁿd]	[ᶮd͡ʒ]	[ᵑɡ]	[ŋ]	[ɲ]	[o]	[p]	[r]	[s]	[t]	[t͡ʃ]	[u]	[w]	[j]	[ˀj]	

=== Maasina Fulfulde (Mali, Burkina Faso) ===
The dominant Fula accent in Mali is referred to as Maasina Fulfulde. Its Latin alphabet was standardized in 1967, and it consists of 32 letters.

Maasina Fulfulde Latin alphabet
’	A a	B b	Ɓ ɓ	C c	D d	Ɗ ɗ	E e	F f	G g	H h	I i	J j	K k	L l	M m
[ʔ]	[a]	[b]	[ɓ]	[t͡ʃ]	[d]	[ɗ]	[e]	[f]	[g]	[h]	[i]	[d͡ʒ]	[k]	[l]	[m]
Mb mb	N n	Nd nd	Ng ng	Nj nj	Ɲ ɲ	Ŋ ŋ	O o	P p	R r	S s	T t	U u	W w	Y y	Ƴ ƴ
[ᵐb]	[n]	[ⁿd]	[ᵑɡ]	[ᶮd͡ʒ]	[ɲ]	[ŋ]	[o]	[p]	[r]	[s]	[t]	[u]	[w]	[j]	[ʄ]

=== Nigerian Fulfulde and Adamawa Fulfulde (Niger, Nigeria, Cameroon, Burkina Faso) ===
A common Latin alphabet is used in Niger, Nigeria, Cameroon, and Burkina Faso is used for writing of Fulfulde dialects in this region. The dialect spoken in Cameroon and Western Nigeria is Adamawa Fulfulde. The dialect spoken in much of Northern and Central Nigeria (Hausaland) is Nigerian Fulfulde. The dialects spoken in Northern Hausaland in Niger are Eastern (Lettugal) and Western (Gorgal) Niger Fulfulde. The Latin alphabet consists of 39 letters, including digraphs and apostrophe.

Niger / Nigeria / Cameroon Fulfulde Latin alphabet
A a	Aa aa	B b	Mb mb	Ɓ ɓ	C c	D d	Nd nd	Ɗ ɗ	E e	Ee ee	F f	G g	Ng ng	H h	I i	Ii ii	J j	Nj nj
[a]	[aː]	[b]	[ᵐb]	[ɓ]	[t͡ʃ]‍~[c]‍	[d]	[ⁿd]	[ɗ]	[e]	[eː]	[f]	[ɡ]	[ᵑɡ]	[h]	[i]	[iː]	[ɟ]‍	[ᶮɟ]
K k	L l	M m	N n	Ny ny	Ŋ ŋ	O o	Oo oo	P p	R r	S s	T t	U u	Uu uu	W w	X x	Y y	Ƴ ƴ	’
[k]	[l]	[m]	[n]	[ɲ]	[ŋ]	[o]	[oː]	[p]	[r]	[s]	[t]	[u]	[uː]	[w]	[x]	[j]	[jˤ]	[ʔ]

=== Bagirimi Fulfulde (Chad, Central African Republic) ===
The dominant Fulfulde dialect in Chad and Central African Republic, close to Adamawa Fulfulde, is Bagirmi Fulfulde. In 2009, the Chadian government standardized both Latin and Ajami scripts for all indigenous languages of the country, including Bagirmi Fulfulde, in what is known as Chadian National Alphabet.

Bagirmi Fulfulde Latin alphabet
A a	AA aa	B b	Ɓ ɓ	C c	D d	Ɗ ɗ	E e	EE ee	F f	G g	H h	I i	II ii	J j	K k	KH kh	L l	M m
[a]	[aː]	[b]	[ɓ]	[t͡ʃ]‍~[ʃ]‍	[d]	[ɗ]	[e]	[eː]	[f]	[g]	[h]	[i]	[iː]	[d͡ʒ]~[z]‍	[k]	[k]~[x]	[l]	[m]
MB mb	N n	ND nd	NG ng	NJ nj	N̰ n̰	Ŋ ŋ	O o	OO oo	P p	R r	S s	T t	U u	UU uu	W w	Y y	Ƴ ƴ	’
[ᵐb]	[n]	[ⁿd]	[ᵑɡ]	[ᶮd͡ʒ]	[ɲ]	[ŋ]	[o]	[oː]	[p]	[r]	[s]	[t]	[u]	[uː]	[w]	[j]	[jˤ]	[ʔ]

== Ajami alphabet ==
In recent decades, albeit at a slower pace than Fula Latin orthography, there has been conferences, seminars, and attempts by linguists and literaturists in various countries to standardize the Arabic (Ajami) script.

=== Orthographic similarities ===
- Does not use ض, ص, ز, ذ, خ, ث, ظ , these characters are only used for Arabic loanwords across all systems
- Always uses diacritics for vowels, which is rare among non-African Arabic writing systems which usually imply vowels.
  - E is a vowel that most languages like Fulfulde have, except notably Arabic.
    - One way to tackle this was using Imaala, a phenomenon in Old Arabic where the A vowel fronted to an I. According to the Warsh Qur'anic recitation school, this approximated the E vowel and was usually denoted with a filled dot below an alif. Adamawa, Bagirmi, Futa Jallon, Nigerian and Massina used this style.
    - Another way was to simply invent a new diacritic. In Futa Toro, a diacritic approximating < was used.
  - O is another vowel that Fulfulde has in addition, except without established convention
    - Bagirmi and Futa Jallon simply modified the U diacritic, by adding a dot or shaping it differently
    - Other conventions used different sets of arrows
- Long vowels are marked with characters after diacritics
  - Alif (ا) for aa
  - Ya (ي) for ee and ii
    - Except Nigerian and Adamawa Fulfulde Ajami which had a new character (ىٰ)
  - Wa (و) for oo and uu

=== Adamawa Ajami (Cameroon, Nigeria) ===
The dominant Fula accent in Cameroon (Adamawa Region) and Nigeria (Adamawa State) is referred to as Adamawa Fulfulde. the writing conventions of writing in the Arabic script for Adamawa Fulfulde were generally agreed upon and standardized by the 1990s.

The characters highlighted in red are only used for Arabic loanwords, usually in the religious and scientific vocabulary.

Adamawa Fulfulde Arabic alphabet (Cameroon, Nigeria)
ا [aː]/[∅]/[ʔ]	ب [b]	ࢡ [ɓ]	ت [t]	ث [s]	ج [d͡ʒ]	ح [h]	خ [x]	د [d]	ذ [d͡ʒ]	ر [ɾ]/[r]	ز [d͡ʒ]	س [s]	ش [s]	ص [s]	ض [d]	ط [ɗ]
ظ [d͡ʒ]	ع [ʔ]	غ [ɡ]	ڢ [f]	ݠ [p]	ق [k]	ک [k]	ل [l]	م [m]	ن [n]	ه [h]	و [w]	ي [j]	ىٰ [eː]	ࢨ [Ɂʲ]	ࢩ [ɲ]	ء [ʔ]

Like Arabic and most other Ajami, the vowels are written with a diacritic marked around a character. In Adamawa, the convention was that vowels in the beginning of the word would be marked with a diacritic and the 'ayn character, which usually signified a glottal stop, and normal use of diacritics in all other contexts. It uses Imaala convention for E.

Vowel Diacritics in Adamawa Ajami.
Vowels	Short Vowels				Long Vowels			
Vowels	End	Middle	Initial	Isolated	End	Middle	Initial	Isolated
a	عَـــىَـــىَ			◌َ	عَا ىَا ىَا			◌َا
e	عٜـــىٜـــىٜ			◌ٜ	عٜىٰـــىٜىٰـــىٜىٰ			ـٜىٰ
i	عِـــىِـــىِ			◌ِ	عِيـــىِيـــىِي			ـِي
o	عٛـــىٛـــىٛ			◌ٛ	عٛو ىٛو ىٛو			ـٛو
u	عُـــىُـــىُ			◌ُ	عُو ىُو ىُو			ـُو
∅	-			◌ْ	-			

Table uses alif masqura (ى) for middle/end, replaceable with any character. 'Ayn (ع) always used as a vowel carrier as an initial

=== Bagirmi Fulfulde (Chad, Central African Republic) ===
The dominant Fulfulde dialect in Chad and Central African Republic, close to Adamawa Fulfulde, is Bagirmi Fulfulde. In 2009, the Chadian government standardized both Latin and Ajami scripts for all indigenous languages of the country, including Bagirmi Fulfulde, in what is known as Chadian National Alphabet.

Characters highlighted in red are only used for loanwords from Arabic, usually in religious and scientific contexts.

Bagirmi Fulfulde Arabic alphabet (Chad, Central African Republic)
أ إ [∅]/[ʔ]	ب [b]	ٻ [ɓ]	پ [p]	ت [t]	ث [s]	ج [d͡ʒ]	ڃ [ᶮd͡ʒ]	ڄ [jˤ]	چ [t͡ʃ]‍	ح [h]	خ [k]~[x]	د [d]	ڊ [ⁿd]	ذ [d͡ʒ]	ر [r]	ز [d͡ʒ]	س [s]	ش [s]	ص [s]	ض [d]
ط [ɗ]	ظ [d͡ʒ]	ع [ʔ]	غ [ɡ]	ݝ [ŋ]	ڠ [ᵑɡ]	ڢ [f]	ق [ɡ]	ك [k]	ل [l]	م [m]	ݦ [ᵐb]	ن [n]	ݧ [ɲ]	ه [h]	و [w]	ؤ [ʔ]	ي [j]	ئ [ʔ]	ء [ʔ]	

Like Arabic and most other Ajami, the vowels are written with a diacritic marked around a character. In the region, the convention was that vowels in the beginning of the word would be marked with a diacritic and the alif character, and normal use of diacritics in all other contexts. It uses Imaala convention for E.

Vowel diacritics in Bagirmi Ajami
Vowels	Short Vowels				Long Vowels			
Vowels	End	Middle	Initial	Isolated	End	Middle	Initial	Isolated
a	اَىــىَـــىَ			◌َ	اَ ىَا ىَا			◌َا
e	إٜىــىٜـــىٜ			◌ٜ	إٜيـــىٜيـــىٜي			ـٜي
i	إِىـــىِـــىِ			◌ِ	إِيـــىِيـــىِي			ـِي
o	أٗىـــىٗـــىٗ			◌ٗ	أٗو ىٗو ىٗو			ـٗو
u	أُىـــىُـــىُ			◌ُ	أُو ىُو ىُو			ـُو
∅	-			◌ْ	-			

Table uses alif masqura (ى) as a placeholder, replaceable with any character. Alif (ا) always used as a vowel carrier as an initial

=== Pular Fuuta Jalon (Guinea) ===
The dominant Fula accent in Guinea is referred to as Pular Fuuta Jalon. Its Arabic alphabet, despite popular usage and widespread teaching, has never been standardized. A single Arabic letter can correspond to multiple Latin letters and digraphs. Some authors do use small dots and markings to denote a different pronunciation. For example, in a Pular text, one may see the letter ba with three small dots 'ݑ' to indicate a [ɓ] or [p] pronunciation instead of a [b] pronunciation.

The characters in red are only used for loanwords from Arabic, and green highlights denote characters unique to Ajami. Since standardisation has never happened, there was no push to keep it original to the Arabic script.

Pular Ajami alphabet (Guinea)
ا ‌( - / ’ ) [∅]/[ʔ]	ب [b]	ݑ [ɓ]/[p]	ت [t]	ث [s]	ج [t͡ʃ]/[d͡ʒ]	ࣅ(ج࣫࣪) [ɲ]/[ˀj]	ح [h]	خ [x]	د [d]/[ⁿd]	ذ [d͡ʒ]	ر [ɾ]/[r]	ز [d͡ʒ]	س [s]	ش [s]	ص [s]	ض [l]	ط [ɗ]
ظ [d͡ʒ]	ع [ʔ]	غ [ɡ]	ࢻـ ࢻ [f]	ࢼـ ࢼ [g]/[q]	ڨ [ᵑɡ]	ک [k]	ل [l]	م [m]	ࢽـ ࢽ [n]	࢏(ࢽْ)[ŋ]	ࢽۛب [ᵐb]	ࢽۛج [ᶮd͡ʒ]	ه [h]	و [w]/[oː]/[uː]	ي [j]/[eː]/[iː]	ء [ʔ]	

Like Arabic and most other Ajami, the vowels are written with a diacritic marked around a character. In Fuuta Jallon, the convention was that vowels in the beginning of the word would be marked with a diacritic and the 'ayn character, which usually signified a glottal stop, and normal use of diacritics in all other contexts. It uses Imaala convention for E.

Vowel diacritics in Pular
Vowels	Short Vowels				Long Vowels			
Vowels	End	Middle	Initial	Isolated	End	Middle	Initial	Isolated
a	عَـــىَـــىَ			◌َ	عَا ىَا ىَا			◌َا
e	عٜـــىٜـــىٜ			◌ٜ	عٜيـــىٜيـــىٜي			ـٜي
i	عِـــىِـــىِ			◌ِ	عِيـــىِيـــىِي			ـِي
o	عࣾـــىࣾـــىࣾ			◌ࣾ	عࣾو ىࣾو ىࣾو			ـࣾو
u	عُـــىُـــىُ			◌ُ	عُو ىُو ىُو			ـُو
∅	-			◌ْ	-			

Table uses alif masqura (ى) as a placeholder, replaceable with any character. 'Ayn (ع) always used as a vowel carrier as an initial

=== Maasina Fulfulde (Mali, Burkina Faso) ===
The dominant Fula accent in Mali is referred to as Maasina Fulfulde. Its Arabic alphabet was standardized in 1987, following a UNESCO conference on the topic in Bamako, the capital city of Mali.

Characters highlighted in red are only used for loanwords which use such characters, usually in religious contexts.

Maasina Fulfulde Arabic alphabet (Mali)
ا [∅]/[ʔ]	ب [b]	ٽ [ɓ]	ت [t]	ٺ [t͡ʃ]	ث [s]	ج [d͡ʒ]	ڃ [ᶮd͡ʒ]	ح [h]	خ [x]	ݗ [ŋ]	د [d]	ڌ [ⁿd]	ذ [d͡ʒ]	ر [r]	ز [d͡ʒ]	س [s]	ش [ʃ]
ص [s]	ض [d]	ط [ɗ]	ظ [d͡ʒ]	ع [ʔ]	غ [ɡ]	ݝ [ɡ]	ڠ [ᵑɡ]	ڢ [f]	ݠ [p]	ڧ [k]	ك [k]	ل [l]	م [m]	ݥ [ɓ]	ن [n]	ه [h]	و [w]
ؤ [ʔ]	ي [j]	ئ [ʔ]	ࢩ [ɲ]	ۑ [ɲ]													

Like Arabic and most other Ajami, the vowels are written with a diacritic marked around a character. In Maasina, the convention was that vowels in the beginning of the word would be marked with a diacritic and the alif character, and normal use of diacritics in all other contexts. It uses Imaala convention for E.

Vowel diacritics for Maasina Fulfulde
Vowels	Short Vowels				Long Vowels			
Vowels	End	Middle	Initial	Isolated	End	Middle	Initial	Isolated
a	اَىــىَـــىَ			◌َ	اَ ىَا ىَا			◌َا
e	اٜىــىٜـــىٜ			◌ٜ	اٜيـــىٜيـــىٜي			ـٜي
i	اِىـــىِـــىِ			◌ِ	اِيـــىِيـــىِي			ـِي
o	اࣷىـــىࣷـــىࣷ			◌ࣷ	اࣷو ىࣷو ىࣷو			ـࣷو
u	اُىـــىُـــىُ			◌ُ	اُو ىُو ىُو			ـُو
∅	-			◌ْ	-			

Table uses alif masqura (ى) as a placeholder, replaceable with any character. Alif (ا) always used as a vowel carrier as an initial

=== Nigerian Fulfulde ===
In Northern and Northwestern Nigeria, a dialect of Fula, referred to as Nigerian Fulfulde is spoken by Fula people. The Arabic script for this dialect has not been standardized by any governmental entity. However, this region has centuries of literary tradition. In the late 20th century and early 21st century, certain adaptations to the Arabic alphabet have come to be common in different Fula documents. This includes a Fulfulde translation of the Bible as well.

Characters in red are only used in loanwords from Arabic, and characters in green are characters unique to Ajami.

Nigerian Fulfulde Ajami alphabet
ا ‌( - / ’ ) [∅]/[ʔ]	ب [b]	ٻ [ɓ]	ت [t]	ث [s]	ج [ɟ]	ح [h]	خ [k]([x])	د [d]	ذ [ɟ]	ر [ɾ]/[r]	ز [ɟ]	س [s]	ش [t͡ʃ]~[c]	ص [s]	ض [d]	ط [ɗ]	ظ [ɟ]	ع [ʔ]
غ [ɡ]	ݝ [ŋ]	ف [f]	ڤ [p]	ق [k]	ک [k]	ل [l]	م [m]	مب [ᵐb]	ن [n]	نج [ᶮɟ]	ند [ⁿd]	نغ [ᵑɡ]	ه [h]	و [w]/[oː]/[uː]	ي [j]/[iː]	ىٰ [eː]	ۑ [ʄ]	

Like Arabic and most other Ajami, the vowels are written with a diacritic marked around a character. In Nigeria, the convention was that vowels in the beginning of the word would be marked with a diacritic and the alif character, and normal use of diacritics in all other contexts. It uses Imaala convention for E, however created a new character to replace the ya character.

Vowel diacritics in Nigeria Fulfulde
Vowels	Short Vowels				Long Vowels			
Vowels	End	Middle	Initial	Isolated	End	Middle	Initial	Isolated
a	اَىـــىَـــىَ			◌َ	اَا ىَا ىَا			◌َا
e	اٜىـــىٜـــىٜ			◌ٜ	اٜىٰـــىٜىٰـــىٜىٰ			ـٜىٰ
i	اِىـــىِـــىِ			◌ِ	اِيـــىِيـــىِي			ـِي
o	اٛىـــىٛـــىٛ			◌ٛ	اٛو ىٛو ىٛو			ـٛو
u	اُىـــىُـــىُ			◌ُ	اُو ىُو ىُو			ـُو
∅	-			◌ْ	-			

Table uses alif masqura (ى) as a placeholder, replaceable with any character. Alif (ا) always used as a vowel carrier as an initial

=== Pulaar Fuuta Tooro (Senegal, Gambia, Mauritania) ===
The dominant Fula accent in Senegal, Gambia, and Mauritania is referred to as Pulaar Fuuta Tooro. The Arabic-based script of Pulaar was set by the government as well, between 1985 and 1990, although never adopted by a decree, as the effort by the Senegalese ministry of education was to be part of a multi-national standardization effort.

Characters in red are only used in loanwords nad not native words.

Futa Tooro Arabic alphabet
ا [∅]/[ʔ]	ب [b]	ݒ [p]	ࢠ [ɓ]	ت [t]	ݖ [c]~[t͡ʃ]	ث [s]	ج [d͡ʒ]	ڃ [jˤ]	ح [h]	خ [k] ([x])	د [d]	ذ [d͡ʒ]	ر [r]	ز [d͡ʒ]	س [s]	ش [s] ([ʃ])
ص [s]	ض [d]	ط [ɗ]	ظ [d͡ʒ]	ع [ʔ]	غ [ɡ]	ݝ [ŋ]	ف [f]	ق [k]	ک [k]	گ [ɡ]	ل [l]	م [m]	ن [n]	ݧ [ɲ]	ه [h]	و [w]
ي [j]

Like Arabic and most other Ajami, the vowels are written with a diacritic marked around a character. In Futa Toro, the convention was that vowels in the beginning of the word would be marked with a diacritic and the alif character, and normal use of diacritics in all other contexts. It does not use Imala convention for E, instead creating a new diacritic.

Vowel diacritics in Pulaar
Vowels	Short Vowels				Long Vowels			
Vowels	End	Middle	Initial	Isolated	End	Middle	Initial	Isolated
a	اَىــىَـــىَ			◌َ	اَ ىَا ىَا			◌َا
e	اࣹىــىࣹـــىࣹ			◌ࣹ	اࣹيـــىࣹيـــىࣹي			ـࣹي
i	اِىـــىِـــىِ			◌ِ	اِيـــىِيـــىِي			ـِي
o	اࣷىـــىࣷـــىࣷ			◌ࣷ	اࣷو ىࣷو ىࣷو			ـࣷو
u	اُىـــىُـــىُ			◌ُ	اُو ىُو ىُو			ـُو
∅	-			◌ْ	-			

Table uses alif masqura (ى) as a placeholder, replaceable with any character. Alif (ا) always used as a vowel carrier as an initial

== Adlam script ==
Several alphabets have been devised to write Fulfulde in the sixties, in Mali, in Senegal, in Nigeria, and in Guinea. During the late 1980s an alphabetic script was devised by the teenaged brothers Ibrahima and Abdoulaye Barry, in order to represent the Fulani language. After several years of development it started to be widely adopted among Fulani communities, and is currently taught in Guinea, Nigeria, Liberia and other nearby countries. The name adlam is an acronym derived from the first four letters of the alphabet (A, D, L, M), standing for Alkule Dandayɗe Leñol Mulugol ("the alphabet that protects the peoples from vanishing"). There are Android apps to send SMS in adlam and to learn the alphabet. On computers running Microsoft Windows, the adlam script is natively supported as part of the upcoming feature update of Windows 10 version 1903 (codenamed 19H1) build 18252.

== Example ==
An example of all the different writing systems using the first line of the Universal Declaration of Human Rights, using the closest dialect translation.

	Latin	Ajami	Adlam
Adamawa Fulfulde	E tuugnaadeko wonde keftingal horma kala neɗɗo e nder ɓesngu aadee e hakkeeji potɗi woni dnaɗɗuudi ndimaague potal e jam e nder aduna	ىٰ تُوغنَادٜكٛ وٛندٜ هٛرمَ كَلَ نٜطٛ ىٰ ندٜر بٜٔسغُ عَادٜىٰ ىٰ هَكٜىٰيِ يِ ݠُتطِ وٛنِ دنَطُدِ ندِمَاغٜ بٔٛتَل يَم ىٰ ندٜر عَدُنَ	𞤫 𞤼𞤵𞤵𞤺𞤲𞤢𞤢𞤣𞤫𞤳𞤮 𞤱𞤮𞤲𞤣𞤫 𞤳𞤫𞤬𞤼𞤭𞤲𞤺𞤢𞤤 𞤸𞤮𞤪𞤥𞤢 𞤳𞤢𞤤𞤢 𞤲𞤫𞠛𞠛𞤮 𞤫 𞤲𞤣𞤫𞤪 𞠚𞤫𞤧𞤲𞤺𞤵 𞤢𞤢𞤣𞤫𞤫 𞤫 𞤸𞤢𞤳𞤫𞤫𞤶𞤭 𞤨𞤮𞤼𞠛𞤭 𞤱𞤮𞤲𞤭 𞤣𞤲𞤢𞠛𞠛𞤵𞤵𞤣𞤭 𞤲𞤣𞤭𞤥𞤢𞤢𞤺𞤵𞤫 𞤨𞤮𞤼𞤢𞤤 𞤫 𞤶𞤢𞤥 𞤫 𞤲𞤣𞤫𞤪 𞤢𞤣𞤵𞤲𞤢
Bagirmi Fulfulde	E tuugnaadeko wonde keftingal horma kala neɗɗo e nder ɓesngu aadee e hakkeeji potɗi woni dnaɗɗuudi ndimaague potal e jam e nder aduna	ي تُوإٜنَادٜكٗ وٗندٜ هٗرمَ كَلَ نٜطٗ ي ندٜر بٜٔسغُ اَدٜي ي هَكٜييِ يِ ݠُتطِ وٗنِ دنَطُدِ ندِمَاغٜ بٔٗتَل يَم ي ندٜر اَدُنَ	𞤫 𞤼𞤵𞤵𞤺𞤲𞤢𞤢𞤣𞤫𞤳𞤮 𞤱𞤮𞤲𞤣𞤫 𞤳𞤫𞤬𞤼𞤭𞤲𞤺𞤢𞤤 𞤸𞤮𞤪𞤥𞤢 𞤳𞤢𞤤𞤢 𞤲𞤫𞠛𞠛𞤮 𞤫 𞤲𞤣𞤫𞤪 𞠚𞤫𞤧𞤲𞤺𞤵 𞤢𞤢𞤣𞤫𞤫 𞤫 𞤸𞤢𞤳𞤫𞤫𞤶𞤭 𞤨𞤮𞤼𞠛𞤭 𞤱𞤮𞤲𞤭 𞤣𞤲𞤢𞠛𞠛𞤵𞤵𞤣𞤭 𞤲𞤣𞤭𞤥𞤢𞤢𞤺𞤵𞤫 𞤨𞤮𞤼𞤢𞤤 𞤫 𞤶𞤢𞤥 𞤫 𞤲𞤣𞤫𞤪 𞤢𞤣𞤵𞤲𞤢
Pular (Futa Jallon)	Tippude e faamu ganndal ndi mu ɓeynguure e hannduyeeji fottanaaɗi woni tugalal hetaare, peewal et ɓuttu e nder aduna on	تِبࣾدٜ ي فَامُ قَندَل دِ مُ بࣾۛىْࣾورٜ ي هَندُيٜيجِ فࣾتَنَاطِ وࣾنِ تُقَلَل هٜتَارٜ، بࣾوَل اٜت بࣾۛتُ ي دٜر اَدُنَ اࣾن	𞤼𞤭𞤨𞤵𞤣𞤫 𞤫 𞤬𞤢𞤥𞤵 𞤺𞤢𞤲𞤲𞤣𞤢𞤤 𞤲𞤣𞤭 𞤥𞤵 𞠚𞤫𞤴𞤲𞤶𞤵𞤪𞤫 𞤫 𞤸𞤢𞤲𞤲𞤵𞤴𞤫𞤫𞤶𞤭 𞤬𞤮𞤼𞤼𞤢𞤲𞤢𞠛𞤭 𞤱𞤮𞤲𞤭 𞤼𞤵𞤺𞤢𞤤𞤢𞤤 𞤸𞤫𞤼𞤢𞤪𞤫, 𞤨𞤫𞤫𞤱𞤢𞤤 𞤫 𞠚𞤵𞤼𞤼𞤵 𞤫 𞤲𞤣𞤫𞤪 𞤢𞤣𞤵𞤲𞤢 𞤮𞤲
Maasina Fulfulde	Nde laati tabitinki manngu e fotuki hakke neɗɗaaku ngu wosintaako ngu ɓiɓɓiaadam fuu maɓɓe hanjum joɗɗinanaaɗum rimɗuki	ڌٜ لَاتِ تَبِتِنكِ مَڠُ ي ڢـࣷتُكِ هَكٜ نٜطَاكُ ݗُ وـࣷسِنتَاكـࣷ ݗُ ٽِٽِآدَم ڢُو مَٽٜ هَنيُم يـࣷطِنَنَاطُم رِمطُكِ	𞤐𞤁𞤫 𞤂𞤢𞤼𞤭 𞤼𞤢𞤦𞤭𞤼𞤭𞤲𞤭𞤳𞤭 𞤥𞤢𞤲𞤲𞤺𞤵 𞤫 𞤬𞤮𞤼𞤵𞤳𞤭 𞤖𞤢𞤳𞤳𞤫 𞤲𞤫𞤯𞤣𞤢𞤢𞤳𞤵 𞤲𞤺𞤵 𞤱𞤮𞤧𞤭𞤲𞤼𞤢𞤢𞤳𞤮 𞤲𞤺𞤵 𞤦𞤭𞤦𞤭𞤶𞤢𞤢𞤣𞤢𞤥 𞤬𞤵𞤵 𞤥𞤢𞤦𞤦𞤫 𞤸𞤢𞤲𞤶𞤵𞤥 𞤶𞤮𞤶𞤣𞤭𞤲𞤢𞤲𞤢𞤢𞤶𞤵𞤥 𞤪𞤭𞤥𞤣𞤵𞤳𞤭
Nigerian Fulfulde	Tippude e faamu ganndal ndi mu ɓeynguure e hannduyeeji fottanaaɗi woni tugalal hetaare, peewal et ɓuttu e nder aduna on	تِبٗدٜ ىٰ فَامُ قَندَل دِ مُ ٻٜنغٗورٜ ىٰ هَندُيٜيجِ فٗتَنَاطِ وٗنِ تُقَلَل هٜتَارٜ، بٗوَل اٜت ٻُتُ ىٰ دٜر اَدُنَ اٗن	𞤼𞤭𞤨𞤵𞤣𞤫 𞤫 𞤬𞤢𞤥𞤵 𞤺𞤢𞤲𞤲𞤣𞤢𞤤 𞤲𞤣𞤭 𞤥𞤵 𞠚𞤫𞤴𞤲𞤶𞤵𞤪𞤫 𞤫 𞤸𞤢𞤲𞤲𞤵𞤴𞤫𞤫𞤶𞤭 𞤬𞤮𞤼𞤼𞤢𞤲𞤢𞠛𞤭 𞤱𞤮𞤲𞤭 𞤼𞤵𞤺𞤢𞤤𞤢𞤤 𞤸𞤫𞤼𞤢𞤪𞤫, 𞤨𞤫𞤫𞤱𞤢𞤤 𞤫 𞠚𞤵𞤼𞤼𞤵 𞤫 𞤲𞤣𞤫𞤪 𞤢𞤣𞤵𞤲𞤢 𞤮𞤲
Pulaar (Futa Toro)	Nde laati tabitinki manngu e fotuki hakke neɗɗaaku ngu wosintaako ngu ɓiɓɓiaadam fuu maɓɓe hanjum joɗɗinanaaɗum rimɗuki	ڌࣹ لَاتِ تَبِتِنكِ مَڠُ ي ڢـࣷتُكِ هَكࣹ نࣹطَاكُ ݗُ وـࣷسِنتَاكـࣷ ݗُ ٽِٽِآدَم ڢُو مَٽࣹ هَنيُم يـࣷطِنَنَاطُم رِمطُكِ	𞤐𞤁𞤫 𞤂𞤢𞤼𞤭 𞤼𞤢𞤦𞤭𞤼𞤭𞤲𞤭𞤳𞤭 𞤥𞤢𞤲𞤲𞤺𞤵 𞤫 𞤬𞤮𞤼𞤵𞤳𞤭 𞤖𞤢𞤳𞤳𞤫 𞤲𞤫𞤯𞤣𞤢𞤢𞤳𞤵 𞤲𞤺𞤵 𞤱𞤮𞤧𞤭𞤲𞤼𞤢𞤢𞤳𞤮 𞤲𞤺𞤵 𞤦𞤭𞤦𞤭𞤶𞤢𞤢𞤣𞤢𞤥 𞤬𞤵𞤵 𞤥𞤢𞤦𞤦𞤫 𞤸𞤢𞤲𞤶𞤵𞤥 𞤶𞤮𞤶𞤣𞤭𞤲𞤢𞤲𞤢𞤢𞤶𞤵𞤥 𞤪𞤭𞤥𞤣𞤵𞤳𞤭

== Unicode ==
The extended Latin characters used in the Latin transcription of Fula were incorporated since an early version of the Unicode Standard. At least some of the extended Arabic characters used in Ajami are also in the Unicode standard. The Adlam alphabet was added to the Unicode Standard in June 2016 with the release of version 9.0.

== Other scripts ==
There has been at least one effort to adapt the N'Ko alphabet to the Pular language of Guinea. In the late 1960s, David Dalby recorded two additional scripts- the Dita script created by Oumar Dembélé (or Dambele) of Bamako, and another script created by Adama Ba. Dita was influenced by the traditional iconography of various Malian communities, while Ba's system was a cursive script which Dalby compared to the handwritten Latin alphabet. Both scripts were alphabetic in nature, and in the face of disapproval from officials who favored the promotion of Latin-script literacy, neither had seen widespread adoption as of 1969.
