= Fui =

Fui or FUI may refer to:

- Foundation University, Islamabad, Pakistan
- Fui Vakapuna (born 1984), American football player
- Bagirmi Fulfulde, a Fula dialect spoken in Central Africa (ISO 639-3:fui)

== See also ==
- Fuy (disambiguation)
