= Pular grammar =

Pular grammar is the set of structural rules that govern the Pular language, one of the Fula languages of the Niger-Congo language family spoken in West Africa. It is complicated and varies from region to region. This may explain why it is virtually impossible to find literature that teaches advanced topics in Pular grammar. The following explanation concerns mainly the Pular language spoken in Futa Jallon. To facilitate learning, all expressions are translated into English.

== Nouns, pronouns and adjectives ==
=== Nouns and their articles ===
The articles of nouns vary significantly and there are no simple rules are apparent for going from the singular form to the plural form; however, a few generalizations can be made.

Pular nouns do not have indefinite articles. For example: a hand = jungo 𞤶𞤵𞤲𞤺𞤮.

The most common definite articles associated with plural nouns are: 𞤩𞤫𞤲 ɓen (which is reserved for nouns indicating many people), ɗin, and ɗen. The latter two articles are used for nouns referring to objects or things. 𞤩𞤫𞤲 ɓen, 𞤯𞤭𞤲 ɗin, and 𞤯𞤫𞤲 ɗen correspond to "the" in English. 𞤮𞤲 on is the singular form of ɓen, and is used for nouns that indicate a single person.

Nouns borrowed from other languages, especially French, follow some systematic patterns. In the singular form of the noun, the definite article is on (there are some situations where other articles can work as well, but the on article seems to work all the time). If the noun indicates an object or a thing, the plural form of the noun is usually created by adding 𞤶𞤭 ji at the end of the singular form, and ɗin is used as the article for the plural form. If the imported noun indicates a person, the singular form of the noun will end with jo, but the plural form will end with ɓe, and ɓen is used as the article for the plural form.

The plural articles ɓen, ɗin, and ɗen correspond to ɓe, ɗi, and ɗe in other varieties of Fula, respectively. Pular pronunciation tends to nasalize these words, which is represented by the trailing letter "n."

Please see the tables below for examples that demonstrate these systematic patterns.

==== Singular and plural forms of borrowed nouns ====
Pular		English	
Singular	Plural	Singular	Plural
𞤨𞤪𞤮𞥅𞤬𞤫𞤧𞤫𞥅𞤪𞤶𞤮 𞤮𞤲 بْۛرࣾوࢻٜسٜيرْجࣾ عࣾࢽ proofeseerjo on	𞤨𞤪𞤮𞥅𞤬𞤫𞤧𞤫𞥅𞤪𞤩𞤫 𞤩𞤫𞤲 بْۛرࣾوࢻٜسٜيرْبٜۛ بٜۛࢽ proofeseerɓe ɓen	the school teacher	the school teachers
𞤥𞤭𞤲𞤭𞤧𞤼𞤭𞤪𞤶𞤮 𞤮𞤲 مِࢽِسْتِرْجࣾ عࣾࢽ ministirjo on	𞤥𞤭𞤲𞤭𞤧𞤼𞤭𞤪𞤩𞤫 𞤩𞤫𞤲 مِࢽِسْتِرْبٜۛ بٜۛࢽ ministirɓe ɓen	the cabinet minister	the cabinet ministers
𞤡𞤮𞤬𞤫𞥅𞤪𞤶𞤮 𞤮𞤲 شࣾفٜيرْجࣾ عࣾࢽ sofeerjo on	𞤡𞤮𞤬𞤫𞥅𞤪𞤩𞤫 𞤩𞤫𞤲 شࣾفٜيرْبٜۛ بٜۛࢽ sofeerɓe ɓen	the driver	the drivers
𞤥𞤫𞤳𞤢𞤲𞤭𞤧𞤭𞤫𞤲𞤶𞤮 𞤮𞤲 مٜکَِسِيَࢽجࣾ عࣾࢽ mekanisienjo on	𞤥𞤫𞤳𞤢𞤲𞤭𞤧𞤭𞤫𞤲𞤩𞤫 𞤩𞤫𞤲 مٜکَِسِيَࢽبٜۛ بٜۛࢽ mekanisienɓe ɓen	the mechanic	the mechanics
𞤣𞤮𞤳𞤼𞤫𞥅𞤪𞤶𞤮 𞤮𞤲 دࣾکْتٜيرْجࣾ عࣾࢽ dokteerjo on	𞤣𞤮𞤳𞤼𞤫𞥅𞤪𞤩𞤫 𞤩𞤫𞤲 دࣾکْتٜيرْبٜۛ بٜۛࢽ dokteerɓe ɓen	the doctor	the doctors
𞤤𞤭𞤥𞤭𞤴𞤫𞥅𞤪 𞤮𞤲 لِمِيٜيرْ عࣾࢽ limiyeer on	𞤤𞤭𞤥𞤭𞤴𞤫𞥅𞤪𞤶𞤭 𞤯𞤭𞤲 لِمِيٜيرْجِ طِࢽ limiyeerji ɗin	the light	the lights
𞤮𞤪𞤣𞤭𞤲𞤢𞤼𞤫𞥅𞤪 𞤮𞤲 عࣾرْدِࢽَتٜيرْ عࣾࢽ ordinateer on	𞤮𞤪𞤣𞤭𞤲𞤢𞤼𞤫𞥅𞤪𞤶𞤭 𞤯𞤭𞤲 عࣾرْدِࢽَتٜيرْجِ طِࢽ ordinateerji ɗin	the computer	the computers
𞤬𞤪𞤭𞤺𞤮𞥅 𞤮𞤲 ࢻْرِࢼُو عࣾࢽ frigoo on	𞤬𞤪𞤭𞤺𞤮𞥅𞤶𞤭 𞤯𞤭𞤲 ࢻْرِࢼُوجِ طِࢽ frigooji ɗin	the refrigerator	the refirigerators
𞤳𞤢𞤴𞤫𞥅 𞤮𞤲 کَيٜي عࣾࢽ kayee on	𞤳𞤢𞤴𞤫𞥅𞤶𞤭 𞤯𞤭𞤲 کَيٜيجِ طِࢽ kayeeji ɗin	the notebook	the notebooks
𞤦𞤭𞤳 𞤮𞤲 بِکْ عࣾࢽ bik on	𞤦𞤭𞤳𞤶𞤭 𞤯𞤭𞤲 بِکْجِ طِࢽ bikji ɗin	the pen	the pens
𞤾𞤢𞤲𞤼𞤭𞤤𞤢𞤼𞤫𞥅𞤪 𞤮𞤲 وَࢽْتِلَتٜيرْ عࣾࢽ vantilateer on	𞤾𞤢𞤲𞤼𞤭𞤤𞤢𞤼𞤫𞥅𞤪𞤶𞤭 𞤯𞤭𞤲 وَࢽْتِلَتٜيرْجِ طِࢽ vantilateerji ɗin	the fan	the fans
𞤼𞤫𞤤𞤫𞥅 𞤮𞤲 تٜلٜي عࣾࢽ telee on	𞤼𞤫𞤤𞤫𞥅𞤶𞤭 𞤯𞤭𞤲 تٜلٜيجِ طِࢽ teleeji ɗin	the TV	the TV's
𞤤𞤢𞤥𞤨𞤵 𞤮𞤲 لَمْبُۛ عࣾࢽ lampu on	𞤤𞤢𞤥𞤨𞤵𞥅𞤶𞤭 𞤯𞤭𞤲 لَمْبُۛوجِ طِࢽ lampuuji ɗin	the lamp	the lamps
𞤼𞤮𞤪𞤧𞤮 𞤮𞤲 تࣾرْسࣾ عࣾࢽ torso on	𞤼𞤮𞤪𞤧𞤮𞥅𞤶𞤭 𞤯𞤭𞤲 تࣾرْسࣾوجِ طِࢽ torsooji ɗin	the flashlight	the flashlights
𞤼𞤢𞥄𞤧𞤭 𞤮𞤲 تَاسِ عࣾࢽ taasi on	𞤼𞤢𞥄𞤧𞤭𞥅𞤶𞤭 𞤯𞤭𞤲 تَاسِيجِ طِࢽ taasiiji ɗin	the coffee cup	the coffee cups
𞤺𞤵𞤾𞤫𞤪𞤲𞤫𞤥𞤢𞤲 𞤮𞤲 ࢼُوٜرْࢽٜمَࢽ عࣾࢽ guverneman on	𞤺𞤵𞤾𞤫𞤪𞤲𞤫𞤥𞤢𞤲𞤶𞤭 𞤯𞤭𞤲 ࢼُوٜرْࢽٜمَࢽْجِ طِࢽ guvernemanji ɗin	the government	the governments
𞤤𞤫𞤳𞥆𞤮𞤤 𞤮𞤲 لٜکّࣾلْ عࣾࢽ lekkol on	𞤤𞤫𞤳𞥆𞤮𞤤𞤶𞤭 𞤯𞤭𞤲 لٜکّࣾلْجِ طِࢽ lekkolji ɗin	the school	the schools
𞤧𞤫𞥅𞤤𞤬𞤮𞤱𞤲 𞤮𞤲 سٜيلْࢻࣾوْࢽ عࣾࢽ seelfown on	𞤧𞤫𞥅𞤤𞤬𞤮𞤱𞤲𞤶𞤭 𞤯𞤭𞤲 سٜيلْࢻࣾوْࢽْجِ طِࢽ seelfownji ɗin	the cell phone	the cell phones

==== Singular and plural forms of most fruits and vegetables ====
The nouns of most fruits and vegetables follow a similar pattern when changing from singular to plural. These nouns have a root form, which perhaps was imported from other languages. The singular form of these nouns is created by adding 𞤪𞤫 -re to the root, and 𞤲'𞤣𞤫𞤲 nden is usually the definite article. By contrast, the plural form is obtained by adding 𞤶𞤫 -je to the root, and 𞤯𞤫𞤲 ɗen is the definite article for the plural form. The table below provides examples to demonstrate this pattern.

Pular			English	
Root	Singular	Plural	Singular	Plural
𞤨𞤵𞤼𞤫𞥅 putee	𞤨𞤵𞤼𞤫𞥅𞤪𞤫 𞤲'𞤣𞤫𞤲 puteere nden	𞤨𞤵𞤼𞤫𞥅𞤶𞤫 𞤯𞤫𞤲 puteeje ɗen	the sweet potato	the sweet potatoes
𞤶𞤢𞥄𞤦𞤫𞤪𞤫 jaabere	𞤶𞤢𞥄𞤦𞤫𞤪𞤫𞥅𞤪𞤫 𞤲'𞤣𞤫𞤲 jaabereere nden	𞤶𞤢𞥄𞤦𞤫𞤪𞤫𞥅𞤶𞤫 𞤯𞤫𞤲 jaabereeje ɗen	the taro/arrowroot	the taros/arrowroots
𞤨𞤭𞤴𞤢 piya	𞤨𞤭𞤴𞤢𞤪𞤫 𞤲'𞤣𞤫𞤲 piyaare nden	𞤨𞤭𞤴𞤢𞤶𞤫 𞤯𞤫𞤲 piyaaje ɗen	the avocado	the avocados
𞤤𞤫𞥅𞤥𞤵𞤲𞥆𞤫 leemunne	𞤤𞤫𞥅𞤥𞤵𞤲𞥆𞤫𞥅𞤪𞤫 𞤲'𞤣𞤫𞤲 leemunneere nden	𞤤𞤫𞥅𞤥𞤵𞤲𞥆𞤫𞥅𞤶𞤫 𞤯𞤫𞤲 leemunneeje ɗen	the orange	the oranges
caccu	caccuure nden	caccuuje ɗen	the lime/lemon	the lime/lemons
kobokobo	kobokoboore nden	kobokobooje ɗen	the egg plant	the egg plants
pompiteeri	pompiteeriire nden	pompiteeriije ɗen	the potato	the potatoes
mango	mangoore nden	mangooje ɗen	the mango	the mangoes
ɲamaku	ɲamakuure nden	ɲamakuuje ɗen	the pepper	the peppers
ɓohe	ɓoheere nden	ɓoheeje ɗen	the fruit of the baobab	the fruits of the baobab
booto	bootoore nden	bootooje ɗen	"A guinean fruit"	"A guinean fruit"
nete	neteere nden	neteeje ɗen	the fruit (pod) of the African locust-bean	the fruits (pods) of the African locust-bean
poore	pooreere nden	pooreeje ɗen	"A guinean fruit"	"A guinean fruit"
cappe	cappeere nden	cappeeje ɗen	"A vegetable similar to cassava roots"	"A vegetable similar to cassava roots"

==== Singular and plural forms of other nouns ====
Pular		English	
Singular	Plural	Singular	Plural
𞤳𞤮𞤴𞤯𞤫 𞤯𞤫𞤲 koyngal ngal	𞤳𞤮𞤴𞤯𞤫 𞤯𞤫𞤲 koyɗe ɗen	the foot	the feet
𞤤𞤫𞤺𞥆𞤢𞤤 𞤲'𞤺𞤢𞤤 leggal ngal	𞤤𞤫𞤯𞥆𞤫 𞤯𞤫𞤲 leɗɗe ɗen	the stick (or branch)	the sticks
𞤦𞤢𞥄𞤬𞤢𞤤 𞤲'𞤺𞤢𞤤 baafal ngal	𞤦𞤢𞥄𞤬𞤫 𞤯𞤫𞤲 baafe ɗen	the door	the doors
𞤣𞤢𞤥𞥆𞤵𞤺𞤢𞤤 𞤲'𞤺𞤢𞤤 dammugal ngal	𞤣𞤢𞤥𞥆𞤵𞤯𞤫 𞤯𞤫𞤲 dammuɗe ɗen	the gate	the gates
busal ngal	buse ɗen	the thigh	the thighs
avionwal ngal	avionje ɗen	the airplane	the airplanes
paɗal ngal	paɗe ɗen	the shoe	the shoes
otowal ngal	otooje ɗen	the vehicle	the vehicles
yiitere nden	gite ɗen	the eye	the eyes
jullere nden	julle ɗen	the carved piece of wood for sitting	the carved pieces of wood for sitting
jungo ngon	juuɗe ɗen	the hand (or arm)	the hands
gorko on	worɓe ɓen	the man	the men
debbo on	rewɓe ɓen	the woman	the women
aadenjo on	aadenɓe ɓen	the human being	the human beings
karamokoojo on	karamokooɓe ɓen	the teacher	the teachers
jangoowo on	jangooɓe ɓen	the reader (or student)	the readers (or students)
hoore nden	koe ɗen	the head	the heads
tuuba nban	tuube ɗen	the trouser	the trousers
pantalon on	pantalonji ɗin	xxx	the pants
telefon on	telefonji ɗin	the phone	the phones
roobu on	roobuuji ɗin	the dress	the dresses
bareeru ndun	bareeji ɗin	the dog	the dogs
ɲaariiru ndun	ɲaariiji ɗin	the cat	the cats
kerooru ndun	kerooji ɗin	the monkey	the monkeys
motooru ndun	motooji ɗin	the motorcycle	the motorcycles

=== Possessive adjectives ===
Term	Pular Example	English Meaning
an	jungo am	my hand
maa	jungo maa	your hand
makko	jungo makko	his/her hand
amen	juuɗe amen	our hands (excluding you)
men	juuɗe men	our hands (inclusive)
mon	juuɗe mon	your hands
maɓɓe	juuɗe maɓɓe	their hands

Note that "jungo" can be used for all when it means "responsibility". Example: No e jungo amen = "it is in our responsibility," or "we are in change." Men acci e jungo mon = "We leave it to you." Also, unlike in English, the possessive adjective comes after the noun in Pular. In the table above, "jungo" is a noun that means hand. Similar to English, the possessive adjective does not vary with the gender or number of what is possessed. It varies only with the noun that possesses. For example:

- ɓeyngu an (my wife) --> moodi an (my husband). Note here that the gender of the noun changed, but the possessive adjective stayed the same (an).
- jungo an (my hand) --> juuɗe an (my hands). Note here that the noun changed from singular to plural, but the possessive adjective stayed the same (an).

The singular possessive in Pular – an – corresponds exactly with the am used in other varieties of Fula. Again, the pronunciation is more nasalized in Pular.

=== Object pronouns ===
lan, ma, te, mo, men, en, on, ɓe.

n	rank	Pular	English
1	1st sing.	Ɓe wallay lan.	They will help me.
2	2nd sing. (future)	Ɓe walle te.	They will help you.
3	2nd sing. (past)	Ɓe wallii ma.	They have helped you.
4	3rd sing.	Ɓe wallay mo.	They will help him/her.
5	1st plu. excl.	Ɓe wallay men.	They will help us (excluding you).
6	1st plu. incl.	Ɓe wallay en.	They will help us (including you).
7	2nd plu.	Ɓe wallay on.	They will help you (plural).
8	3rd plu.	O wallay ɓe.	He/she will help them.

=== Interrogative keywords ===
ko hombo, ko honɗun, ko homɓe, ko honno, ko honto, ko ... honɗi, ko ... njelo, ko ... jelu

n	Pular	English
1	Ko hombo nii?	Who is this?
2	Ko homɓe nii?	Who are these people?
3	Ko honɗun nii?	What (object) is this?
4	Ko dolokaaji honɗi jeyuɗaa?	Which shirts belong to you?
5	Ko honno inneteɗaa?	What is your name?
6	Ko honno o innetee?	What is his/her name?
7	Ko honto yahataa?	Where are you going?
8	Ko cuuɗi honɗi jeyuɗaa?	Which houses do you own?
9	Ko yimɓe njelo ataakunomaa?	How many people attacked you?
10	Ko biiniiji jelu heddi ka frigoo?	How many bottles remain in the refrigerator?

=== Subject pronouns ===
mi, a, o, men, en, on, ɓe, ɗe, ɗi

n	Pular	English
1	𞤃𞤭 𞤬𞤢𞥄𞤥𞤭𞥅 مِࢻَامِي; Mi faamii.	I understand.
2	𞤀 𞤬𞤢𞥄𞤥𞤭𞥅 عَࢻَامِي; A faamii.	You understand.
3	𞤌 𞤬𞤢𞥄𞤥𞤭𞥅 عࣾࢻَامِي; O faamii.	He/She understands.
4	𞤃𞤫𞤲 𞤬𞤢𞥄𞤥𞤭𞥅 مٜࢽْࢻَامِي; Men faamii.	We understand (excluding you).
5	𞤉𞤲 𞤬𞤢𞥄𞤥𞤭𞥅 عٜࢽْࢻَامِي; En faamii.	We understand (including you).
6	𞤌𞤲 𞤬𞤢𞥄𞤥𞤭𞥅 عࣾࢽْࢻَامِي; On faamii.	You understand (plural).
7	𞤇𞤫 𞤬𞤢𞥄𞤥𞤭𞥅 بٜۛࢻَامِي; Ɓe faamii.	They understand (people).
8	𞤍𞤭 𞤼𞤵𞥅𞤲𞤭𞥅 طِتُونِي; Ɗi tuunii.	They have gotten dirty (objects or animals).
9	𞤍𞤫 𞤼𞤵𞥅𞤲𞤭𞥅 طٜتُونِي; Ɗe tuunii.	They have gotten dirty (objects or animals).

=== Demonstrative adjectives ===
Pular has many demonstrative adjectives, which are keywords that indicate the location of a "noun" with respect to the speaker. However, they are usually derived from the definitive articles described above. Here is a partial list:

oo, ɓee (plural = these people), ɗii(plural), ɗee(plural), [ngal, ngol, ngii, ngoo, nguu, nduu, ndee, ndii, ɗan, mbaa, kun, etc...] The English equivalent of these adjective demonstratives are: this, these, that, and those.

=== Indefinite pronouns ===
Note that this is a partial list.

- goɗɗo, goɗɗun, hay e gooto, hay e fus

See the table below for some expressions using indefinite pronouns.

n	Pular	English
1	Goɗɗo no ka hurgo.	Someone is in the bathroom.
2	Goɗɗun luuɓay.	Something will smell.
3	Woɓɓe no arude.	Some people are coming.
4	Goɗɗun muncoto.	Something will be crushed.
5	Mi soodaali hay e fus.	I did not buy anything.
6	A fottaano hay e gooto?	Didn't you meet anyone?
7	Hay e gooto wallaano men.	No one helped us.

=== Others__location ===
ɗoo, gaa, ɗaa, too, gaɗa, gaanin

n	Pular	English
1	Aru ɗoo.	Come here (where I am standing).
2	Aru gaa.	Come over here (In the area where I am).
3	Yahu ɗaa.	Go over there (not too far from me).
4	Yahu too.	Go way over there (far away from me).
5	Himo darii ka ɠaɗa caangol.	He is standing across the river (the river is between the speaker and the person his is standing).
6	Himo darii ka gaanin caangol.	He is standing on this side of the river (the speaker is on the same side of the river where the person is standing).

== Verb forms and conjugations ==
=== Various verb types ===
Pular verbs – like those in other varieties of Fula (with the exception of Adamawa) – fall into one of three "voices": active, middle, and passive. Infinitives in Pular are formed with -gol rather than -de as in other varieties of Fula. The endings are:

- Active: -ugol
- Middle: -agol
- Passive: -egol

Verbal extensions (sometimes dubbed "infixes") can be added between the root and the (active) verb ending to change meaning. Examples of verb endings with this adfixes include: angol, ingol, orgol and others. Please see the table below for examples.

Verb ending	Pular verb	English
ugol	defugol	to cook
ugol	ɲaamugol	to eat
ugol	yarugol	to drink
ugol	windugol	to write
ugol	ronkugol	to get tired
ugol	wallugol	to help
agol	jooɗagol	to sit down
agol	immagol	to get up
agol	sulmagol	to wash one's face
agol	fubbagol	to swim
agol	luɓagol	to borrow (something from someone)
egol	labegol	to look pretty or handsome
egol	foolegol	to be defeated
egol	janfegol	to be cheated
egol	sokegol	to be jailed (or to lock)
angol	gollangol	to work for someone
angol	sonkangol	to yell at someone
angol	addangol	to bring something for someone
angol	aynangol	to keep an eye on something for someone.
angol	defangol	to cook for someone
ingol	findingol	to wake up someone
ingol	jibingol	to give birth to a baby
ingol	sunningol	to "circumcise" someone
ingol	yaggingol	to make someone regret
ingol	aaningol	to make someone worried
orgol	addorgol	to bring along
orgol	naɓorgol	to take someone or something along; to give someone a ride
orgol	okkorgol	to give a gift to someone

=== Affirmative forms of verbs: ===
==== The future form of various verb types ====
1) Active voice verbs (ending in "ugol"): To express the affirmative form of ugol verbs in the future, simply replace the ugol ending with ay. For example, soodugol turns into sooday. Note that the verb does not vary with the subject. The table below provides more examples using the verb "soodugol", which means to buy.

Subject	Future form	English
Mi	sooday	I will buy
A	sooday	You (singular) will buy
O	sooday	he/she will buy
En	sooday	We (including you) will buy
Men	sooday	We (excluding you) will buy
On	sooday	You (plural) will buy
Ɓe	sooday	They (referring to people) will buy

Although the verb does not vary with the subject, it does vary with the object. That is when the object is the singular form of you, the "ay" ending becomes "e". The table below shows some examples of how the future form of "ugol" verbs varies with the object.

Subject	Future form	object	English
O	wallay	lan	He/she will help me.
O	walle	te	He/she will help you(singular).
O	wallay	mo	He/she will help him/her.
O	wallay	en	He/she will help us(including you).
O	wallay	men	He/she will help us(excluding you).
O	wallay	on	He/she will help you(plural).
O	wallay	ɓe	He/she will help them(referring to people).

Verbs with "infixes" (ending in "angol", "ingol" or "orgol", ): To express the affirmative form of these verbs in the future, simply replace the gol ending with ay. For example, jangangol turns into janganay; yaggingol into yagginay; and okkorgol into okkoray. Similar to above, the verb does not vary when the subject varies.

2) Middle voice verbs (ending in "agol"): To express the affirmative form of agol verbs in the future, simply replace the agol ending with oto. For example, fubbagol turns into fubboto. Note that the verb does not vary with the subject. The table below provides more examples using the verb "fubbagol", which means to swim.

Subject	Future form	English
Mi	fubboto	I will swim
A	fubboto	You (singular) will swim
O	fubboto	he/she will swim
En	fubboto	We (including you) will swim
Men	fubboto	We (excluding you) will swim
On	fubboto	You (plural) will swim
Ɓe	fubboto	They (referring to people) will swim

3) Passive voice verbs (ending in "egol"): To express the affirmative form of egol verbs in the future, simply replace the egol ending with ete. For example, weelegolturns into weelete. Note however that this form does not always make sense if the subject is I (mi). For example, "mi sokete" sounds more like "I will have you jailed" than "I will be jailed". The table below provides more examples using the verb "weelegol", which means to be hungry.

Subject	Future form	English
Mi	weelete	I will be (get) hungry
A	weelete	You (singular) will be hungry
O	weelete	he/she will be hungry
En	weelete	We (including you) will be hungry
Men	weelete	We (excluding you) will be hungry
On	weelete	You (plural) will be hungry
Ɓe	weelete	They (referring to people) will be hungry

==== The imperative form of various verb types ====
1) Verbs ending in -ugol makes either -u 2nd pers. sing. or -en 1st pers. plur. or -ee 2nd pers. plur.

okkugol: to give makes Okku : Give; Okken: Let us give and Okkee: Let you give

2) Verbs ending in -agol makes either -o 2nd pers. sing. or -oɗen 1st pers. plur. or -ee 2nd pers. plur.

Jooɗagol: to sit makes Jooɗo gaa : Sit here; Jooɗoɗen : Let us sit; Jooɗee : Let you sit.

3) Verbs ending in -egol do not have an imperative forms though an imperative construction is possible.

Rules when the verb has an infix:

==== The terminated past form of various verb types ====
1) Verbs ending in "ugol": To express the affirmative form of ugol verbs in the "terminated past" form, simply replace the ugol ending with uno. For example, soodugol turns into sooduno. Note that the verb does not vary with the subject. The table below provides more examples using the verb "soodugol".

Subject	Terminated Past form	English
Mi	sooduno	I bought
A	sooduno	You (singular) bought
O	sooduno	he/she bought
En	sooduno	We (including you) bought
Men	sooduno	We (excluding you) bought
On	sooduno	You (plural) bought
Ɓe	sooduno	They (referring to people) bought

Here are some simple sentences where "ugol" verbs are conjugated in the Terminated Past form.

Time reference	Subject	Terminated Past form of "ugol" verb	Object	English
Hanki	mi	sooduno	motooru	Yesterday I bought a motocycle.
Rowani	men	yahuno	Pari	Last year we went to Paris.
Hanki	o	ƴettuno	lekki kin	Yesterday he/she took the medicine.
Hande mbimbi	ɓe	yahuno	ka lekkol	This morning they went to school.
Hanki jemma	a	hiruno	moƴƴa.	Last night you snored a lot.

Although the verb does not vary with the subject, it does vary with the object. That is when the object is either me or you (singular), the "ugol" verb can vary. The table below shows some examples of how the Terminated Past form of "ugol" verbs varies with the object. The chosen verb is "wallugol", which means to help.

Subject	Terminated Past form	Object	English
o	walluno	lan	He/She helped me.
o	wallanno	–	He/She helped me. (Note here that the object "an" is inserted in the verb.)
o	walleno	–	He/She helped you(singular). (Note here too that the object "e" is inserted in the verb.)
o	walluno	ma	He/She helped you (singular).

2) Verbs ending in "agol": To express the affirmative form of agol verbs in the "terminated past" form, simply replace the agol ending with ino. For example, jooɗagol turns into jooɗino. Note that the verb does not vary with the subject. The table below provides more examples using the verb "immgagol", which means to get up.

Subject	Terminated Past form	English
Mi	immino	I got up
A	immino	You (singular) got up
O	immino	he/she got up
En	immino	We (including you) got up
Men	immino	We (excluding you) got up
On	immino	You (plural) got up
Ɓe	immino	They (referring to people) got up

Here are some simple sentences where "agol" verbs are conjugated in the Terminated Past form.

Time reference	Subject	Terminated Past form of "ugol" verb	Object	English
Hanki	mi	gosino	laaɓi tati.	Yesterday I brushed my teeth three times.
Rowani	ɓe	waajino	lan moƴƴa.	Last year they gave me good advice (well).
Hanki	o	janfino	miɲan an	Yesterday he/she cheated my younger sibling.

3) 7Verbs ending in "egol": To express the affirmative form of egol verbs in the "terminated past" form, simply replace the egol ending with ano. For example, lamminegol turns into lamminano. Note that the verb does not vary with the subject. The table below provides more examples using the verb "weelegol", which means to be (get) hungry.

Subject	Terminated Past form	English
Mi	weelano	I was hungry
A	weelano	You (singular) were hungry
O	weelano	he/she was hungry
En	weelano	We (including you) were hungry
Men	weelano	We (excluding you) were hungry
On	weelano	You (plural) were hungry
Ɓe	weelano	They (referring to people) were hungry

Here are some simple sentences where "egol" verbs are conjugated in the Terminated Past form.

Time reference	Subject	Terminated Past form of "ugol" verb	Object	English
Hanki	mi	weelano	moƴƴa.	Yesterday I was hungry a lot.
Rowani	ɓe	jattano	otowal maɓɓe ngal.	[litt. Last year they were rubbed their vehicle.]
Hanki	o	ɲawlano	dolaarji sappo.	Yesterday he/she was loaned ten dollars.

==== The simple past form of various verb types ====
1) Verbs ending in "ugol": To express the affirmative form of ugol verbs in the "simple past" form, simply replace the ugol ending with ii. For example, soodugol turns into soodii. Note that the verb does not vary with the subject. The table below provides more examples using the verb "ɲaamugol", which means to eat.

Subject	Simple Past form	English
Mi	ɲaamii	I have eaten.
A	ɲaamii	You (singular) have eaten.
O	ɲaamii	he/she has eaten.
En	ɲaamii	We (including you) have eaten.
Men	ɲaamii	We (excluding you) have eaten.
On	ɲaamii	You (plural) have eaten.
Ɓe	ɲaamii	They (referring to people) have eaten.

Here are some simple sentences where "ugol" verbs are conjugated in the Simple Past form.

Subject	Simple Past form of "ugol" verb	Object	English
mi	hewtii	ka suudo.	I have arrived at the house.
Gando	foolii	piiro ngon.	Gando has won the fight.
Ɓe	ronkii.	–	They have gotten tired.
A	tampii	moƴƴa.	You have suffered a lot.
Boobo on	nawnii.	–	The baby has gotten sick.

2) Verbs ending in "agol": To express the affirmative form of agol verbs in the "simple past" form, simply replace the agol ending with ike. For example, jooɗagol turns into jooɗike. Note that the verb does not vary with the subject. The table below provides more examples using the verb "immgagol", which means to get up.

Subject	Simple Past form	English
Mi	immike	I got up
A	immike	You (singular) got up
O	immike	he/she got up
En	immike	We (including you) got up
Men	immike	We (excluding you) got up
On	immike	You (plural) got up
Ɓe	immike	They (referring to people) got up

Here are some simple sentences where "agol" verbs are conjugated in the Simple Past form.

Subject	Simple Past form of "agol" verb	Object	English
mi	ɓortike	dolokke maa on.	I have taken off your shirt.
mi	ɲawlike	mo dolaarji joy.	I have borrowed five dollars from him/her.
Boobo on	suumitike	yeeso ngon.	The baby has covered his/her face (with a blanket).
A	ɓornike	dolokke tuunu-ɗo.	You have put on a dirty shirt.

3) Verbs ending in "egol": To express the affirmative form of egol verbs in the "simple past" form, simply replace the egol ending with aama. For example, lamminegol turns into lamminaama. Note that the verb does not vary with the subject. The table below provides more examples using the verb "weelegol", which means to be (get) hungry.

Subject	Terminated Past form	English
Mi	weelaama	I have gotten hungry.
A	weelaama	You (singular) have gotten hungry.
O	weelaama	He/she has gotten hungry.
En	weelaama	We (including you) have gotten hungry.
Men	weelaama	We (excluding you) have gotten hungry.
On	weelaama	You (plural) have gotten hungry.
Ɓe	weelaama	They (referring to people) have gotten hungry.

Here are some simple sentences where "egol" verbs are conjugated in the Simple Past form.

Subject	Simple Past form of "egol" verb	Object	English
mi	weelaama	haa reedu an ndun mutii.	I have gotten hungry to the point my belly has disappeared.
O	lamminaama	fii hitaa'de.	He has been elected for one year.
En	negliizaama	pandi.	We have been neglected too much.
A	halfinaama	sekeree on.	You have been entrusted with the secret.

==== The past participle form of various verb types ====
1) Verbs ending in "ugol": To express the affirmative form of ugol verbs in the "past participle" form, simply replace the ugol ending with i. For example, nawnugol turns into nawni. Note that the past participle form of the verb behaves as an adjective and is preceded by the verb to be conjugated in the present. The table below provides more examples using the verb "ronkugol", which means to be tired.

The verb to be in the present	Past Participle form of "ugol" verb	English
Miɗo	ronki	I am tired.
Hiɗa	ronki	You (singular) are tired.
Himo	ronki	He/she is tired.
Hiɗen	ronki	We (including you) are tired.
Meɗen	ronki	We (excluding you) are tired.
Hiɗon	ronki	You (plural) are tired.
Hiɓe	ronki	They (referring to people) are tired.

Here are some simple sentences where "ugol" verbs are converted to the Past Participle form and used as adjectives.

Verb to be	Simple Past form of "ugol" verb	Object	English
Miɗo	juuti	–	I am tall.
Hiɗa	raɓɓidi	–	You are short.
Veloo-an on no	boni.	–	My bicycle is broken down.
Lekkol-an on no	woɗɗi	–	My school is too far.
Hiɓe	nawni.	–	They are sick.

2) Verbs ending in "agol": To express the affirmative form of agol verbs in the "simple past" form, simply replace the agol ending with ike. For example, jooɗagol turns into jooɗike. Note that the verb does not vary with the subject. The table below provides more examples using the verb "immgagol", which means to get up.

Subject	Simple Past form	English
Mi	immike	I got up
A	immike	You (singular) got up
O	immike	he/she got up
En	immike	We (including you) got up
Men	immike	We (excluding you) got up
On	immike	You (plural) got up
Ɓe	immike	They (referring to people) got up

Here are some simple sentences where "agol" verbs are conjugated in the Simple Past form.

Subject	Simple Past form of "agol" verb	Object	English
mi	ɓortike	dolokke maa on.	I have taken off your shirt.
mi	ɲawlike	mo dolaarji joy.	I have borrowed five dollars from him/her.
Boobo on	suumitike	yeeso ngon.	The baby has covered his/her face (with a blanket).
A	ɓornike	dolokke tuunu-ɗo.	You have put on a dirty shirt.

3) Verbs ending in "egol": To express the affirmative form of egol verbs in the "simple past" form, simply replace the egol ending with aama. For example, lamminegol turns into lamminaama. Note that the verb does not vary with the subject. The table below provides more examples using the verb "weelegol", which means to be (get) hungry.

Subject	Terminated Past form	English
Mi	weelaama	I have gotten hungry.
A	weelaama	You (singular) have gotten hungry.
O	weelaama	He/she has gotten hungry.
En	weelaama	We (including you) have gotten hungry.
Men	weelaama	We (excluding you) have gotten hungry.
On	weelaama	You (plural) have gotten hungry.
Ɓe	weelaama	They (referring to people) have gotten hungry.

Here are some simple sentences where "egol" verbs are conjugated in the Simple Past form.

Subject	Simple Past form of "egol" verb	Object	English
mi	weelaama	haa reedu an ndun mutii.	I have gotten hungry to the point my belly has disappeared.
O	lamminaama	fii hitaa'de.	He has been elected for one year.
En	negliizaama	pandi.	We have been neglected too much.
A	halfinaama	sekeree on.	You have been entrusted with the secret.

=== Negative forms of verbs: ===
==== The future, negative form of various verb types ====
1) Verbs ending in "ugol": To express the negative form of ugol verbs in the future, simply replace the ugol ending with ataa. For example, soodugol turns into soodataa. Note that the verb does not vary with the subject. The table below provides more examples using the verb "soodugol", which means to buy.

Subject	Future, negative form	English
Mi	soodataa	I will not buy
A	soodataa	You (singular) will not buy
O	soodataa	he/she will not buy
En	soodataa	We (including you) will not buy
Men	soodataa	We (excluding you) will not buy
On	soodataa	You (plural) will not buy
Ɓe	soodataa	They (referring to people) will not buy

2) Verbs ending in "agol": To express the negative form of agol verbs in the future, simply replace the agol ending with ataako. For example, fubbagol turns into fubbataako. Note that the verb does not vary with the subject. The table below provides more examples using the verb "fubbagol", which means to swim.

Subject	Future, negative form	English
Mi	fubbataako	I will not swim
A	fubbataako	You (singular) will not swim
O	fubbataako	he/she will not swim
En	fubbataako	We (including you) will not swim
Men	fubbataako	We (excluding you) will not swim
On	fubbataako	You (plural) will not swim
Ɓe	fubbataako	They (referring to people) will not swim

3) Verbs ending in "egol": To express the negative form of egol verbs in the future, simply replace the egol ending with ataake. For example, janfegol turns into fubbataake. Note that the verb does not vary with the subject. The table below provides more examples using the verb "janfegol", which means to be cheated.

Subject	Future, negative form	English
Mi	janfataake	I will not be cheated
A	janfataake	You (singular) will not be cheated
O	janfataake	he/she will not be cheated
En	janfataake	We (including you) will not be cheated
Men	janfataake	We (excluding you) will not be cheated
On	janfataake	You (plural) will not be cheated
Ɓe	janfataake	They (referring to people) will not be cheated

== Adjectives and adverbs ==
The word "very" in English takes many different forms in Pular depending on what adjective is being emphasized. Here are a few examples:

- kaani kas means very ugly.
- laaɓi pos means very clean.
- woɗɗi pon means very far.
- raɓɓiɗi pot means very short.

However, in general, most of these Pular adverbs could be replaced with moƴƴa to emphasize the adjective. But the style would be lost. The table below contains additional examples with their appropriate adverbs.

n	Pular	English
1	luuɓi dus	smells very bad
2	ɲaaɗi ɲas	very mean person (or very rough surface)
3	rawni pen	very white (color)
4	ɓawli kiron	very black (color)
5	satti ken	very difficult (or very hard)
6	ronki kof	very tired
7	sembi pimpitin	very fat (usually a person)
8	sewi ɲila	very thin

== Sentence structure ==
=== Making Comparisons ===
- Comparing with "ɓuri"

n	Pular	English
1	Veloo an on no tuuni ɓuri veloo maa on.	My bicycle is dirtier than your bicycle.
2	salon maɓɓe on no yaaji ɓuri salon men on.	Their living room is wider than our living room.
3	Binɗi maa ɗin no jangoo ɓuri binɗi an ɗin.	Your hand writing is more legible than mine.
4	Faransee no satti ɓuri matematik.	French is more complicated than Math.
5	Hanki hari hiɓe ronki ɓuri ko woowi kon.	Yesterday they were more tired than usual.
6	Ko arata mi antereenoto ɓuri ko mi antereenii rowani kon.	Next year I will train more than I did last year.
7	Miɗo faalaa soodude ɓuri killooji tati teewu.	I want to buy more than three kilos of meat.
7	Seppugol soondowoo no wondi e cellal ɓuri dogugol wondewonde.	Walking often is more healthy than running occasionally.

- Comparing with "wa"
- Comparing with "fotta"

=== Contrasting ideas ===
- Expressing contrasting ideas with "kono" (which means but)

Pular	English
Kotoo an no juuti, kono jaaja an no raɓɓiɗi.	My older brother is tall, but my older sister is short.
Himo weelaa, kono o sali ɲaamude.	He/she is hungry, but he/she refuses to eat.
Hiɓe jogii jawdi, kono ɓe wallataa tampuɗo	They are rich, but they don't help poor people.
Mi waɗii duuɓi joy ameriki, kono mi ronku waawude ingiliisi.	I have lived in America for five years, but I can't speak English.

=== Cause and effect ===
- Expressing cause with "ɓayru"

#	Pular	English
1	Ɓayru a moƴƴaa, hay e gooto wallataa ma.	Because you are not nice, no one will help you.
2	Ɓe inni: "O naatataa ɓayru doloke makko on no kaani."	They said: "He/she will not come in because his/her shirt is ugly."
3	Ɓayru a sattinii pirii on, mi waawataa soodude buy.	Since the price is too high [litt. you made the price too high], I cannot buy a lot.
4	Ɓayru o jangaano, o paasaano.	Since he/she did not study, he/she did not pass.
5	Ɓayru ɓe juulataa, ɓe naatataa aljanna.	Since they don't pray, they will not go to heaven.
6	Ɓayru a fiimay, a waɗataa espoor ekadi a vaksinataako, a nawnay soondowoo.	Since you smoke, you don't exercise and you don't get vaccinated, you will often be sick.

=== Time clauses ===
- Expressing time clauses with "tuma"

#	Pular	English
1	Tuma reedu maa ndun fetti, a accay ɲaamugol haa feƴƴintina.	After (when) your belly explodes, you will stop eating too much.
2	Tuma o arti, mi yeetoto mo.	After (when) he/she returns, I will tell him/her.
3	Tuma mi ndikki, mi fuɗɗitoto gollude.	After (when) I get better, I will go back to work [litt. restart working].
4	Tuma boobooɓe ɓen waawi wowlude, ɓe jentataako.	After (when) the babies learn to speak, they will not be quiet.
5	Tuma fenoowo wowli goonga, lagine gaɲay Cup-Dafrik.	After a lier tells the truth, Guinea will win the African Cup of Nations.
6	Tuma otowal ngal gayni wulude, ayskriim maa on yoosay.	After the car is done warming up, your ice-cream will melt.

- Expressing time clauses with "haa"

n	Pular	English
1	Jiwo on jombataake haa o heɓa duuɓi sappoo e jeetati.	The girl will not be wedded (taken as a bride) until she turns eighteen.
2	Fewndo men waynondiraynoo ka ayropooru, mi wulluno haa gite an ɗen ɓuuti.	While (when) we were saying our good-byes at the airport, I cried until my eyes got swollen.
3	Mo suttii sigareeti, o fiimay haa ɲalaande (ɲande) o maayi.	If someone gets addicted to cigarettes, he/she will smoke until the day he/she dies.
4	Fii Alla, sabbolan haa mi gayna.	Please, wait for me until I finish.
5	Den ɲande mi huluno. Ɓayru gayuurindin jokkiilan, mi doguno haa koythe an ɗen acci meemude leydi.	That day I was really terrified. When the lion chased me, I ran until my legs stopped touching the ground. [Note that "ɓayru", which usually mean because, is used here to mean when]

- Expressing time clauses with "tuma woo"
- Expressing time clauses with "fewndo"

n	Pular	English
1	Fewndo mi hewti ka labutaane, hari moodi makko no wullude.	When I arrived at the hospital, her husband was crying.
2	Fewndo laamu Seeku Tuuree, hari gineyen ɓe ɓen no tampi.	During Seeku Tuuree's administration [litt. During the reign of Seeku Tuuree], the Guineans were suffering.
3	Ee, awa oo debbo no wakkilii! Fewndo mi feƴƴaynoo ɗoo bimbi, hari himo gollude. Haa jooni o fowtaaki.	Men, let me tell you this lady is a hard worker! While I was passing here this morning, she was working. She still has not taken a break.
4	Fewndo mi wonunoo ka koleez hari moodi an no ka liisee	While I was in middle school, my husband was in high school.
5	Rowani, fewndo ka vakansiigi, hari miɗo Pari.	Last year, during the summer vacations, I was in Paris.

=== Relative clauses ===
Relative clauses in Pular are often used to give more details about a noun or an idea within a sentence. Thus they play a similar role in English. They are often associated with the following relative pronouns:

- ɗo = who (singular). This pronoun usually comes after a conjugated verb. Ex: ... gorko nawnu ɗo. = ... a man who is sick.
- mo = who (singular). Unlike ɗo, mo usually comes after a noun. Ex: ... gorko mo nawnaa. ... a man who is not sick.
- ɓe = who (plural)
- wondema = that
- ɗi, ɗe, ko, ɗan, ngal, etc... = that
- mo/ɓe/ɗi/ɗe ... mun = whose. This is a partial list since these pronouns are related to the definitive articles of the nouns.

Please see the table below for examples that demonstrate the use of relative clauses.

n	Pular	English
1	Miɗo jogii ɓibbe ɗiɗo hoɗu ɓe Pari.	I have two children who live in Paris.
2	Suka an hoɗu ɗo Niw york on no nawni.	My son who lives in New York is sick.
3	Miɗo andi mawɗo mo suka mun jogii otooje tati.	I know an old man whose son has three vehicles.
4	Ko hombo jeyi ɗii vellooji ɗi pineeji mun haajitoraa hendu.	Who owns these bicycles whose tires don't need air?
5	Meɗen yewtude fii worɓe ɓe ɓeynguuli mun dogi sabu angal kaalisi.	We are talking about men whose wives left because of a lack of money.
6	Mi faalaaka gorko mo maraa jawdi.	I don't want a man who does not have money.
7	Mi yiɗaa ɲaamugol maafe ko waɗaaka ɲamaku.	I don't like any sauce that doesn't have pepper.
8	Miɗo andi hiɗa seytini.	I know that you are upset. Note that the relative pronoun is omitted here.
9	Mi nanii wondema hanki hari hiɓe nawni.	I heard that they were sick yesterday.
10	Mi jangii e deftere wondema leydi ndin no murliɗiri wa balonre.	I read in a book that the earth is round like a soccer ball.
11	Ɓe hoolaaki wondema wakkilaare ɓeyday arsike gorko.	They don't believe that hardwork can increase a man's luck.
12	Miɗo sikki tun o alaa e yeetaade en ngoonga on.	I just think that he/she is not telling us the truth.
13	Mi nanuno ka radioo hanki woo (wondema) gere on ɓuttii.	I heard on the radio yesterday that the war has ended.

=== Conditional clauses ===
- Expressing conditional clauses with "si"
