= Fuy =

Fuy or FUY may refer to:

- Fuy River, Chile
- Fuyug language (ISO 639: fuy)
- Puerto Fuy, Chile

== See also ==
- Fui (disambiguation)
