= Borgu Fulfulde =

Variety of the Fula language

- Native to: Benin, Togo
- Ethnicity: Fula
- Native speakers: 800,000 (2019–2021)
- Language family: Niger–Congo?: Atlantic–Congo; Senegambian; Fula–Wolof; Fula; West Central; Borgu Fulfulde
- Dialects: Bakuure; Korakuure; Juguure; Caabankeere
- Writing system: Latin

Language codes
- ISO 639-3: fue
- Glottolog: borg1235

Borgu Fulfulde, also known as Borgu Fulani, Benin-Togo Fulfulde, Fulbe-Borgu, or Peul is a variety of the Fula language a West Atlantic language part of the Niger-Congo language family, it is spoken primarily in the Borgou Department of Benin, spanning Nigeria, other parts of Benin, as well as Togo and parts of Burkina Faso.

Phonologically, Borgu Fulfulde exhibits a system of vowel and consonant sounds, with a notable presence of glottalized and nasalized consonants. Morphologically, the language is agglutinative, forming words through the addition of prefixes and suffixes to root morphemes. The grammatical structure is characterized by a system of noun class agreement, where various affixes indicate the gender and number of nouns.

Word order in Borgu Fulfulde typically follows a subject-object-verb (SOV) pattern, and the language employs postpositions rather than prepositions for expressing spatial and temporal relationships. Syntactically, it features a system of verb conjugations that indicate tense, aspect, and mood. Borgu Fulfulde traditionally uses the Latin alphabet for written communication, although in some regions, an adapted version of the Arabic script or Ajami is also employed.

== Origins ==
The presence of Borgu Fulfulde in Benin can be attributed to historical migrations and interactions among the Fula people. The Fula, also known as Fulani, are a nomadic or semi-nomadic ethnic group spread across West Africa. They have a long history of migration and have settled in various regions over time.

Fula communities gradually migrated to the Borgu region, which spans parts of Nigeria, Benin, and Niger. This movement could have been influenced by factors such as search for pastureland for their livestock, trade opportunities, or escaping conflicts. As they settled in the Borgu region, the Fula people adapted to local conditions, leading to the development of Borgu Fulfulde, a variety of the Fula language specific to the region.
