= Fula language =

Senegambian language of West and Central Africa

Fula
- فولا (Arabic); Peul (French)
- Fulfulde 𞤊𞤵𞤤𞤬𞤵𞤤𞤣𞤫 ࢻُلْࢻُلْدٜ Pulaar 𞤆𞤵𞤤𞤢𞥄𞤪 ݒُلَارْ Pular 𞤆𞤵𞤤𞤢𞤪 بُۛلَر
- Native to: Western Africa
- Region: Sahel
- Ethnicity: Fula
- Speakers: L1: 37 million (2014–2021); L2: 2.7 million (2019)
- Language family: Niger–Congo?: Atlantic–Congo; West Atlantic; Senegambian; Fula–Wolof; Fula
- Writing system: Latin; Adlam; Arabic (Ajami)

Official status
- Official language in: Burkina Faso; Mali
- Recognised minority language in: Cameroon; Niger

Language codes
- ISO 639-1: ff – Fulah
- ISO 639-2: ful – Fulah
- ISO 639-3: ful – inclusive code – Fulah; Individual codes: fuc – Pulaar (Senegambia, Mauritania) fuf – Pular (Guinea, Sierra Leone) ffm – Maasina Fulfulde (Mali, Ghana) fue – Borgu Fulfulde (Benin, Togo) fuh – Western Niger Fulfulde (Burkina, Niger) fuq – Central–Eastern Niger Fulfulde (Niger) fuv – Nigerian Fulfulde (Nigeria) fub – Adamawa Fulfulde (Cameroon, Chad, Nigeria) fui – Bagirmi Fulfulde (CAR)
- Glottolog: fula1264
- Core and peripheral Fula-speaking regions. Note that most of these areas, with the exceptions of Senegal and Guinea, are not primarily Fula-speaking, as this map shows only the absolute numbers of speakers.

- Person: Pullo 𞤆𞤵𞤤𞥆𞤮
- People: Fulɓe 𞤊𞤵𞤤𞤩𞤫
- Language: W: Pulaar 𞤆𞤵𞤤𞤢𞥄𞤪; E: Fulfulde 𞤊𞤵𞤤𞤬𞤵𞤤𞤣𞤫

Fula (/ˈfuː.lə/, FOO-lə), natively known as Fulfulde and also known as Fulani (/fʊ.ˈlɑː.niː/, fuu-LAH-nee) or Fulah (Fulfulde, Pulaar, Pular; Adlam: 𞤊𞤵𞤤𞤬𞤵𞤤𞤣𞤫, 𞤆𞤵𞤤𞤢𞥄𞤪, 𞤆𞤵𞤤𞤢𞤪; Ajami: ࢻُلْࢻُلْدٜ, ݒُلَارْ, بُۛلَر), is a Senegambian language spoken by around 36.8 million people as a set of various dialects in a continuum that stretches across some 18 countries in West and Central Africa. Along with other related languages such as Serer and Wolof, it belongs to the Atlantic geographic group within Niger–Congo, more specifically to the Senegambian branch. Unlike most other Niger-Congo languages, Fula does not have tones.

It is spoken as a first language by the Fula people ("Fulani", Fula: Fulɓe) from the Senegambia region and Guinea to Cameroon, Nigeria, and Sudan and by related groups such as the Toucouleur people in the Senegal River Valley. It is also spoken as a second language by various peoples in the region, such as the Kirdi of northern Cameroon and northeastern Nigeria.

== Nomenclature ==
Several names are applied to the language, just as to the Fula people. They call their language Pulaar or Pular in the western dialects and Fulfulde in the central and eastern dialects. Fula, Fulah and Fulani in English come originally from Manding (especially Mandinka but also Malinke and Bamana) and Hausa, respectively. Peul in French, also occasionally found in literature in English, comes from Wolof.

== Status ==
Fula is a lingua franca in Guinea, Guinea-Bissau, Senegal, Gambia, northeastern Nigeria, Cameroon, Mali, Burkina Faso, northern Ghana, southern Niger, and northern Benin (in Borgou Region, where many speakers are bilingual), and a local language in many African countries, such as Mauritania, Sierra Leone, Togo, CAR, Chad, and Sudan. It has more than 95 million speakers in total.

== Varieties ==
While there are numerous varieties of Fula, it is typically regarded as a single language. Wilson (1989) states that "travelers over wide distances never find communication impossible," and Ka (1991) concludes that despite its geographic span and dialect variation, Fulfulde is still fundamentally one language. However, Ethnologue has found that nine different translations are needed to make the Bible comprehensible for most Fula speakers, and it treats those varieties as separate languages. Fula dialects are also often split into four regions: the Western area, Central area, Niger and Nigeria, and the Eastern area. The dialects are as follows:

Western Area

- Pulaar
- Pular

Central Area

- Maasina Fulfulde
- Gorgal Fulfulde
- Borgu Fulfulde

Niger and Nigeria

- Nigerian Fulfulde (also known as Hausa States Fulani)
- Niger Lettugal Fulfulde

Eastern Area

- Adamawa Fulfulde
- Bagirmi Fulfulde

== Phonology ==
=== Consonants ===
		Labial	Alveolar	Palatal	Velar	Glottal
Nasal		m	n	ɲ	ŋ	
Plosive	voiceless	p	t	c ~ t͡ʃ	k	ʔ
Plosive	voiced	b	d	ɟ ~ d͡ʒ	ɡ	
Plosive	prenasal	ᵐb	ⁿd	ᶮɟ ~ ᶮd͡ʒ	ᵑɡ	
Implosive		ɓ	ɗ			
Fricative		f	s			h
Trill			r			
Approximant	plain		l	j	w	
Approximant	glottalized			ˀj		

The two sounds /c/ and /ɟ/, may be realized as affricate sounds [tʃ] and [dʒ].

=== Vowels ===
	Front	Central	Back
Close	i iː		u uː
Mid	e eː		o oː
Open		a aː	

Short /i e o u/ vowel sounds can also be realized as [ɪ ɛ ɔ ʊ].

== Morphology ==
Fula is based on verbonominal roots, from which verbal, noun, and modifier words are derived. It uses suffixes (sometimes inaccurately called infixes, as they come between the root and the inflectional ending) to modify meaning. These suffixes often serve the same purposes in Fula that prepositions do in English.

=== Noun classes ===
The Fula or Fulfulde language is characterized by a robust noun class system, with 24 to 26 noun classes being common across the Fulfulde dialects. Noun classes in Fula are abstract categories with some classes having semantic attributes that characterize a subset of that class' members, and others being marked by a membership too diverse to warrant any semantic categorization of the class' members. For example, classes are for stringy, long things, and another for big things, another for liquids, a noun class for strong, rigid objects, another for human or humanoid traits etc. Gender does not have any role in the Fula noun class system and the marking of gender is done with adjectives rather than class markers. Noun classes are marked by suffixes on nouns. These suffixes are the same as the class name, though they are frequently subject to phonological processes, most frequently the dropping of the suffix's initial consonant.

The table below illustrates the class name, the semantic property associated with class membership, and an example of a noun with its class marker. Classes 1 and 2 can be described as personal classes, classes 3–6 as diminutive classes, classes 7–8 as augmentative classes, and classes 9–25 as neutral classes. It is formed on the basis of McIntosh's 1984 description of Kaceccereere Fulfulde, which the author describes as "essentially the same" as David Arnott's 1970 description of the noun classes of the Gombe dialect of Fula. Thus, certain examples from Arnott also informed this table.

Class name	Meaning	Example
o 𞤮	Person singular	laam-ɗo 'chief'; also loan words
ɓe 𞤩𞤫	Person plural	laam-ɓe 'chiefs'
ngel 𞤲'𞤺𞤫𞤤	Diminutive singular	loo-ngel 'little pot'
kal 𞤳𞤢𞤤	Diminutive quantities	con-al 'small quantity of flour'
ngum/kum 𞤲'𞤺𞤵𞤥/𞤳𞤵𞤥	Diminutive pejorative	laam-ngum/laam-kum 'worthless little chief'
kon/koy 𞤳𞤮𞤲/𞤳𞤮𞤴	Diminutive plural	ullu-kon/ullu-koy 'small cats/kittens'
nde 𞤲𞥋𞤣𞤫	Various, including globular objects, places, times	loo-nde 'storage pot'
ndi 𞤲𞥋𞤣𞤭	Various, including uncountable nouns	com-ri 'tiredness'
ndu 𞤲𞥋𞤣𞤵	Various	ullu-ndu 'cat'
nga 𞤲'𞤺𞤢	Various, including some large animals	nood-a 'crocodile'
nge 𞤲'𞤺𞤫	mainly for 'cow,' 'fire,' 'sun' 'hunger,'	nagg-e 'cow'
ngo 𞤲'𞤺𞤮	Various	juu-ngo 'hand'
ngu 𞤲'𞤺𞤵	Various	ɓow-ngu 'mosquito'
ngal 𞤲'𞤺𞤢𞤤	Various including augmentative singular	ɗem-ngal 'tongue'
ngol 𞤲'𞤺𞤮𞤤	Various, often long things	ɓog-gol 'rope'
ngii/ngil 𞤲'𞤺𞤭𞥅/𞤲'𞤺𞤭𞤤	Various including augmentative singular	ɓog-gii/ɓog-gii 'big rope'
ka 𞤳𞤢	Various	laan-a 'boat'
ki 𞤳𞤭	Various	lek-ki 'tree'
ko 𞤳𞤮	Various	haak-o 'soup'
kol 𞤳𞤮𞤤	'Calf' 'foal'	ɲal-ol 'calf', mol-ol 'foal'
ɗam 𞤯𞤢𞤥	mainly for liquids	lam-ɗam 'salt', ndiy-am 'water'
ɗum 𞤯𞤵𞤥	Neutral	maw-ɗum 'big thing'
ɗe 𞤯𞤫	Nonhuman plural	juu-ɗe 'hands'
ɗi 𞤯𞤭	Nonhuman plural	na'i 'cows'

=== Voice ===
Verbs in Fula are usually classed in three voices: active, middle, and passive. Not every root is used in all voices. Some middle-voice verbs are reflexive.

A common example are verbs from the root -𞤤𞤮𞥅𞤼 loot-:

- 𞤤𞤮𞥅𞤼𞤵𞤣𞤫 lootude, to wash (something) [active voice]
- 𞤤𞤮𞥅𞤼𞤢𞥄𞤣𞤫 lootaade, to wash (oneself) [middle voice]
- 𞤤𞤮𞥅𞤼𞤫𞥅𞤣𞤫 looteede, to be washed [passive voice]

=== Consonant mutation ===
Another feature of the language is initial consonant mutation between singular and plural forms of both nouns and verbs in most dialects. In Pular, however, only nouns experience consonant mutation, not verbs.

A simplified schema is:

- w ↔ b ↔ mb
- r ↔ d ↔ nd
- y ↔ j ↔ nj
- w ↔ g ↔ ng
- f ↔ p
- s ↔ c
- h ↔ k

=== Pronouns ===
Fula has inclusive and exclusive first-person plural pronouns. The inclusive pronouns include both the speaker and those being spoken to, while the exclusive pronouns exclude the listeners.

The pronoun that corresponds to a given noun is determined by the noun class. Because men and women belong to the same noun class, the English pronouns "he" and "she" are translated into Fula by the same pronoun. However, depending on the dialect, there are some 25 different noun classes, each with its own pronoun. Sometimes those pronouns have both a nominative case (i.e., used as verb subject) and an accusative or dative case (i.e., used as a verb object) as well as a possessive form. Relative pronouns generally take the same form as the nominative.

== Writing systems ==
Five different scripts have been or are used to write Fula. It was historically written in a form of the Arabic script known as Ajami, and although not standardized, it is still used by some today.

During the colonial period and after independence, the Latin script began to be used to write Fula, leading to efforts facilitated by UNESCO to standardize transcription. This process also addressed other African languages, incorporating use of modified letters to represent sounds particular to these languages, and it has been the basis for Latin-based Fula orthographies since the mid-1960s.

There were two unsuccessful efforts in the 1950s and 1960s to create a unique script to write Fulfulde, namely Fula Dita and Fula Ba. In 1989, the Adlam script was created specifically for Fula.

=== Adlam script ===
Adlam Pular 𞤀𞤣𞤤𞤢𞤥 𞤆𞤵𞤤𞤢𞤪
- Script type: Alphabet
- Creator: Ibrahima Barry and Abdoulaye Barry
- Period: created 1989
- Direction: Right-to-left script
- Languages: Fula

ISO 15924
- ISO 15924: Adlm (166), Adlam

Unicode
- Unicode alias: Adlam
- Unicode range: U+1E900–U+1E95F

In the late 1980s and early 1990s, two teenage brothers, Ibrahima and Abdoulaye Barry from the Nzérékoré Region of Guinea, created the Adlam script, which accurately represents all the sounds of Fulani. The script is written from right to left and includes 28 letters with 5 vowels and 23 consonants.

=== Arabic script ===
Fula has also been written in the Arabic script or the Ajami script since before European colonization by many scholars and learned people including Usman dan Fodio and the early emirs of the northern Nigeria emirates. This continues to a certain degree and notably in some areas like Guinea and Cameroon.

Fula also has Arabic loanwords.

=== Latin alphabet ===
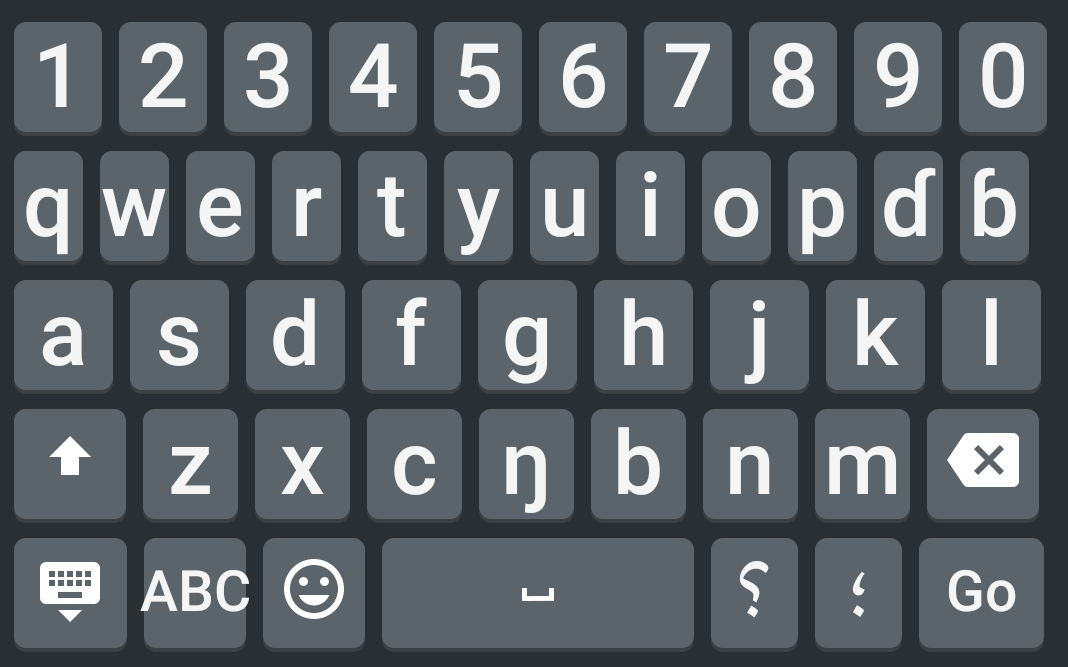
Smartphone keyboard used for Fula, with the special letters D with hook (ɗ), B with hook (ɓ) and eng (ŋ)

When written using the Latin script, Fula uses the following additional special "hooked" characters to distinguish meaningfully different sounds in the language: Ɓ/ɓ [ɓ], Ɗ/ɗ [ɗ ], Ŋ/ŋ [ŋ], Ɲ/ɲ [ ɲ], Ƴ/ƴ [ˀj]. The letters c, j, and r, respectively represent the sounds [c ~ tʃ], [ɟ ~ dʒ], and [r]. Double vowel characters indicate that the vowels are elongated. An apostrophe (ʼ) is used as a glottal stop. It uses the five vowel system denoting vowel sounds and their lengths. In Nigeria ʼy substitutes ƴ, and in Senegal Ñ/ñ is used instead of ɲ.

==== Sample Fula alphabet ====
a, aa, b, mb (or nb), ɓ, c, d, nd, ɗ, e, ee, f, g, ng, h, i, ii, j, nj, k, l, m, n, ŋ, ɲ (ny or ñ), o, oo, p, r, s, t, u, uu, w, y, ƴ (or ʼy), ʼ

The letters q, v, x, z are used in some cases for loan words.

Fula Alphabets
A	B	Nb	Ɓ	C	D	Nd	Ɗ	E	F	G	Ng	H	I	J	Nj	K	L	M	N	Ŋ	Ɲ	O	P	R	S	T	U	W	Y	Ƴ	ʼ
Lowercase
a	b	nb	ɓ	c	d	nd	ɗ	e	f	g	ng	h	i	j	nj	k	l	m	n	ŋ	ɲ	o	p	r	s	t	u	w	y	ƴ	ʼ
IPA
a	b	ᵐb	ɓ	c~t͡ʃ	d	ⁿd	ɗ	ɛ~e	f	g	ᵑɡ	h	ɪ~i	ɟ~d͡ʒ	ᶮɟ~ᶮd͡ʒ	k	l	m	n	ŋ	ɲ	ɔ~o	p	r	s	t	ʊ~u	w	j	ˀj	ʔ

Long vowels are written doubled: <aa, ee, ii, oo, uu> The standard Fulfulde alphabet adopted during the UNESCO-sponsored expert meeting in Bamako in March 1966 is as follows: a, b, mb, ɓ, c, d, nd, ɗ, e, f, g, ng, h, i, j, nj, k, l, m, n, ŋ, ny (later ɲ or ñ), o, p, r, s, t, u, w, y, ƴ, ʼ.

== Sample text ==
The following is a sample text in Fula of Article 1 of the Universal Declaration of Human Rights. The first line is in Adlam, the second in Latin script, the third in IPA.

𞤋𞤲𞥆𞤢𞤥𞤢 𞤢𞥄𞤣𞤫𞥅𞤶𞤭 𞤬𞤮𞤬 𞤨𞤮𞤼𞤭, 𞤲𞤣𞤭𞤥𞤯𞤭𞤣𞤭 𞤫 𞤶𞤭𞤦𞤭𞤲𞤢𞤲𞥆𞤣𞤫 𞤼𞤮 𞤦𞤢𞤲𞥆𞤺𞤫 𞤸𞤢𞤳𞥆𞤫𞥅𞤶𞤭. 𞤉𞤩𞤫 𞤽𞤮𞥅𞤣𞤭 𞤥𞤭𞥅𞤶𞤮 𞤫 𞤸𞤢𞤳𞥆𞤭𞤤𞤢𞤲𞤼𞤢𞥄𞤺𞤢𞤤 𞤫𞤼𞤫 𞤫𞤩𞤫 𞤨𞤮𞤼𞤭 𞤸𞤵𞥅𞤬𞤮 𞤲𞤣𞤭𞤪𞤣𞤫 𞤫 𞤲𞤣𞤫𞤪 𞤩 𞤭𞤴𞤽𞤵𞤴𞤵𞤥𞥆𞤢𞥄𞤺𞤵
Innama aadeeji fof poti, ndimɗidi e jibinannde to bannge hakkeeji. Eɓe ngoodi miijo e hakkilantaagal ete eɓe poti huufo ndirde e nder ɓ iynguyummaagu.
/inːama aːdeːɟi fof poti, ⁿdimɗidi e ɟibinanⁿde to banᵑge hakːeːɟi. eɓe ᵑgoːdi miːɟo e hakːilantaːgal ete eɓe poti huːfo ⁿdirde e ⁿder ɓ ijᵑgujumːaːgu./
"All human beings are born free and equal in dignity and rights. They are endowed with reason and conscience and should act towards one another in a spirit of brotherhood."

== See also ==
- Pular grammar (a presentation for one variety of Fula)
- David Whitehorn Arnott

== Notes ==
=== References ===
- Arnott, D. W. (1956). "The Middle Voice in Fula". Bulletin of the School of Oriental and African Studies. 18 (1): 130–144. doi:10.1017/S0041977X00122244. JSTOR 610132. S2CID 163033896.
- Arnott, D. W. (1970). The Nominal and Verbal Systems of Fula. London: Oxford University Press. ISBN 978-0-19-815127-2.
- Arnott, D. W. (2003). "Fula". In Frawley, W. (ed.). International Encyclopedia of Linguistics. Vol. 2. Oxford University Press.
- McIntosh, Mary (1984). Fulfulde Syntax and Verbal Morphology. London: St Edmundsbury Press. ISBN 9780710300744.
- Paradis, Carole (1992). Lexical Phonology and Morphology: The Nominal Classes in Fula. New York: Garland Publishing. ISBN 9780815306979.
- Reichardt, Charles Augustus Ludwig (1876). Grammar of the Fulde Language: With an Appendix of Some Original Traditions and Portions of Scripture Translated Into Fulde: Together with Eight Chapters of the Book of Genesis. Translated by Dr. Baikie. Church Missionary Society.
- Shehu, Ahmadu (2014). "Stress Placement Rules in Fulfulde: A Review". HARSHE Journal of African Languages: 169–186.
- Wilson, W. A. A. (1945). "Atlantic". In Bendor-Samuel, John (ed.). The Niger–Congo Languages. pp. 81–104.
