= Bagirmi Fulfulde =

Dialect of the Fula language

- Bagirmi Fulfulde بَقِرْمِ فُلْفُلْدٜ
- Native to: Chad
- Region: Chari-Baguirmi
- Ethnicity: Fula, Wodaabe
- Native speakers: (undated figure of 180,000)
- Language family: Niger–Congo?: Atlantic–Congo; Senegambian; Fula–Wolof; Fula; Eastern; Bagirmi Fulfulde
- Writing system: Latin; Ajami; Mostly Unwritten

Language codes
- ISO 639-3: fui
- Glottolog: bagi1244

Bagirmi Fulfulde also known as Baghirmi Peul or Bagirmi Fula is a variety of the Fula language spoken primarily in the Chari-Baguirmi region of Chad as well as in the Central African Republic. Bagirmi Fulfulde, like other Fula varieties, has a consonant inventory with sounds such as stops, fricatives, and nasals. It typically includes a set of oral and nasalized vowels.

The lexicon of Bagirmi Fulfulde shares many common words with other Fula varieties. Bagirmi Fulfulde, like other Fula varieties, is generally classified as a member of the Atlantic branch of the Niger–Congo language family. It exhibits agglutinative features, where affixes are added to a root to convey grammatical meaning.

Fula languages, including Bagirmi Fulfulde, often have a complex noun class system, which is reflected in the agreement patterns with verbs and modifiers. Verbs in Bagirmi Fulfulde typically undergo various conjugations to indicate tense, aspect, and mood.

Bagirmi Fulfulde shares core grammatical features with other varieties of Fula, such as Pulaar and Adamawa Fulfulde spoken in different regions.

Bagirmi Fulfulde is not to be confused with the Bagirmi language, an unrelated language that belongs to the Nilo-Saharan language family.

== Orthography ==
Bagirmi Fulfulde has generally been a largely oral language, and rarely written. The literary language of Chad, as well as its national lingua franca has been Chadian Arabic. Thus, for much of history, Bagrimi Fulfulde has lacked standardized orthographic conventions. However, in the early 21st century, the government of Chad has attempted to create national-level Latin-derived and Arabic-derived scripts that would be suitable for all indigenous languages of Chad. In 2009, these two scripts were adopted by a government decree.

Bagirmi Fulfulde Latin alphabet
A a	AA aa	B b	Ɓ ɓ	C c	D d	Ɗ ɗ	E e	EE ee	F f	G g	H h	I i	II ii	J j	K k	KH kh	L l	M m
[a]	[aː]	[b]	[ɓ]	[t͡ʃ]‍~[ʃ]‍	[d]	[ɗ]	[e]	[eː]	[f]	[g]	[h]	[i]	[iː]	[d͡ʒ]~[z]‍	[k]	[k]~[x]	[l]	[m]
MB mb	N n	ND nd	NG ng	NJ nj	N̰ n̰	Ŋ ŋ	O o	OO oo	P p	R r	S s	T t	U u	UU uu	W w	Y y	Ƴ ƴ	’
[ᵐb]	[n]	[ⁿd]	[ᵑɡ]	[ᶮd͡ʒ]	[ɲ]	[ŋ]	[o]	[oː]	[p]	[r]	[s]	[t]	[u]	[uː]	[w]	[j]	[jˤ]	[ʔ]

Bagirmi Arabic alphabet
Arabic (Latin) [IPA]	أ إ ‌( - ) [∅]/[ʔ]	ب (B b) [b]	ٻ (Ɓ ɓ) [ɓ]	پ (P p) [p]	ت (T t) [t]	ث (S s) [s]
Arabic (Latin) [IPA]	ج (J j) [d͡ʒ]~[z]‍	ڃ (NJ nj) [ᶮd͡ʒ]	ڄ (Ƴ ƴ) [jˤ]‍	چ (C c) [t͡ʃ]‍~[ʃ]‍	ح (H h) [h]	خ (KH kh) [k]~[x]
Arabic (Latin) [IPA]	د (D d) [d]	ڊ (ND nd) [ⁿd]	ذ (J j) [d͡ʒ]~[z]‍	ر (R r) [r]	ز (J j) [d͡ʒ]~[z]‍	س (S s) [s]
Arabic (Latin) [IPA]	ش (CH ch) [s]~[ʃ]	ص (S s) [s]	ض (D d) [d]	ط (Ɗ ɗ) [ɗ]	ظ (J j) [d͡ʒ]~[z]‍	ع ( ’ ) [ʔ]
Arabic (Latin) [IPA]	غ (KH kh) [x]	ݝ (Ŋ ŋ) [ŋ]	ڠ (NG ng) [ᵑɡ]	ف (F f) [f]	ق (G g) [g]	ك (K k) [k]
Arabic (Latin) [IPA]	ل (L l) [l]	م (M m) [m]	ݦ (MB mb) [ᵐb]	ن (N n) [n]	ݧ (N̰ n̰) [ɲ]	ه (H h) [h]
Arabic (Latin) [IPA]	و (W w) [w]	ؤ ‌( ’ ) [ʔ]	ي (Y y) [j]	ئ ‌( ’ ) [ʔ]	ء ‌( ’ ) [ʔ]	

Vowel at the beginning of a word
A	E	I	O	U
Short vowels
أَ	إٜ	إِ	أٗ	أُ
Long vowels
Aa	Ee	Ii	Oo	Uu
آ	إٜيـ / إٜي	إِيـ / إِي	أٗو	أُو

Vowel at the middle or end of a word
a	e	i	o	u	∅
Short vowels
◌َ	◌ٜ	◌ِ	◌ٗ	◌ُ	◌ْ
Long vowels
aa	ee	ii	oo	uu	
◌َا	◌ٜٜيـ / ◌ٜي	◌ِيـ / ◌ِي	◌ٗو	◌ُو	
