= Central-Eastern Niger Fulfulde =

Variety of the Fula language

- Lettugal Niiser Fulfulde لٜتُّغَلْ نِيسٜرْ فُلْفُلْدٜ
- Native to: Niger
- Ethnicity: Fula, Wodaabe
- Native speakers: 860,000 (2021)
- Language family: Niger–Congo?: Atlantic–Congo; Senegambian; Fula–Wolof; Fula; East Central; Central-Eastern Niger Fulfulde
- Writing system: Latin; Ajami

Language codes
- ISO 639-3: fuq
- Glottolog: cent2018

Central-Eastern Niger Fulfulde, also known as Lettugal Niiser Fulfulde (Ajami: لٜتُّغَلْ نِيسٜرْ فُلْفُلْدٜ) is a variety of the Fula language, a Niger–Congo language predominantly spoken in the Central and Eastern regions of Niger, particularly among the Fulani people. The linguistic structure of this language exhibits distinct features, including a Subject-Verb-Object (SVO) word order. Prepositions and postpositions are utilized in the language to convey spatial relationships. Genitives, articles, adjectives, numerals, and relatives follow noun heads, contributing to the overall complexity of sentence structures. The language employs a question-word-final pattern, placing question words at the end of interrogative sentences. Additionally, there is a specific set of affixes, comprising one prefix and nine suffixes, which play a crucial role in marking number and subject in verbs.

Word order nuances are significant, as it distinguishes subjects, objects, indirect objects, given and new information, as well as topics and comments within sentences. Furthermore, verb affixes are essential for indicating number and subject, with their usage being obligatory. Class marking with participles is also mandatory in Central-Eastern Niger Fulfulde.

The language exhibits both middle and passive voice constructions, allowing for a nuanced expression of actions and their agents. Causatives are incorporated to denote actions that are caused or induced by external factors. Phonologically, the language adheres to a combination of consonant-vowel (CV), consonant-vowel-consonant (CVC), consonant-vowel-vowel (CVV), and consonant-vowel-vowel-consonant (CVVC) structures. Importantly, Central-Eastern Niger Fulfulde is nontonal, meaning that pitch variations do not play a distinctive role in conveying meaning, in contrast to tonal languages where pitch differences can alter the meaning of a word.

Central-Eastern Niger Fulfulde is spoken by the Wodaabe people and is culturally distinct from other varieties of Fula, with many loanwords from Hausa used. Most speakers also speak Hausa.

== Orthography ==
Fulfulde Latin alphabet
A a	Aa aa	B b	Mb mb	Ɓ ɓ	C c	D d	Nd nd	Ɗ ɗ	E e	Ee ee	F f	G g	Ng ng	H h	I i	Ii ii	J j	Nj nj
[a]	[aː]	[b]	[ᵐb]	[ɓ]	[t͡ʃ]‍~[c]‍	[d]	[ⁿd]	[ɗ]	[e]	[eː]	[f]	[ɡ]	[ᵑɡ]	[h]	[i]	[iː]	[ɟ]‍	[ᶮɟ]
K k	L l	M m	N n	Ny ny	Ŋ ŋ	O o	Oo oo	P p	R r	S s	T t	U u	Uu uu	W w	X x	Y y	Ƴ ƴ	’
[k]	[l]	[m]	[n]	[ɲ]	[ŋ]	[o]	[oː]	[p]	[r]	[s]	[t]	[u]	[uː]	[w]	[x]	[j]	[jˤ]	[ʔ]
