= Nigerian Fulfulde =

Variety of the Fula language

- Fulfulde Caka Naajeeriya فُلْفُلْدٜ شَکَ نَاجٜىٰرِيَ
- Native to: Nigeria
- Region: Sahel
- Ethnicity: Fula
- Native speakers: 17 million (2020)
- Language family: Niger–Congo?: Atlantic–Congo; Senegambian; Fula–Wolof; Fula; East Central; Nigerian Fulfulde
- Writing system: Arabic (Ajami); Latin

Language codes
- ISO 639-3: fuv
- Glottolog: nige1253

Nigerian Fulfulde, also known as Fulfulde, Fula, or Fulani is a variety of the Fula language spoken by the Fulani people in Nigeria, particularly in the Northern region of Nigeria. It belongs to the West Atlantic branch of the Niger-Congo language family. Phonologically, Nigerian Fulfulde exhibits a system of vowel harmony and a relatively simple consonant inventory, including stops, fricatives, and nasal sounds.

The syntax of Nigerian Fulfulde is characterized by a subject-verb-object (SVO) word order, but it is flexible due to the use of extensive nominal and verbal agreement markers. These markers convey information about gender, number, and person, playing a crucial role in indicating grammatical relationships within sentences. The language employs a complex system of noun classes, which impacts both nominal and verbal concord.

Word order in Nigerian Fulfulde is subject to pragmatic and contextual factors, allowing for variations in emphasis and focus. It often employs topic-comment structures, with the topic appearing at the beginning of the sentence and the comment providing additional information. Additionally, the language features extensive use of proverbs, idioms, and metaphors, reflecting the cultural characteristics of the Fulani people.

In terms of sociolinguistics, Nigerian Fulfulde is used in various domains, including everyday communication, traditional ceremonies, and religious contexts.

Nigerian Fulfulde has 80–90% intelligibility with Adamawa Fulfulde and is most similar to Central-Eastern Niger Fulfulde.

== Origins ==
Nigerian Fulfulde is thought to have originated by some time in the 16th and 17th centuries with the arrival of Fulani pastoralists into Nigeria from Senegambia. As they migrated, they gradually settled in various parts of present-day Nigeria.

The Fulani movement into Nigeria was influenced by factors such as environmental changes, the search for pasture for their cattle, and interactions with diverse ethnic groups.

By the 19th century, the language became widespread across the northern region of Nigeria and in the early 19th century was spread by military conquest by Usman dan Fodio. Nigerian Fulfulde also spread throughout Nigeria by immigration and pastoralists groups moving throughout the Sahel region in search of water for their pastures.

== Orthography ==
Nigerian Fulfulde is written using Ajami and Latin scripts.

The use of Arabic script to write local languages of West Africa, especially in Northern Nigeria, started by the Islamic clerics in Hausa city states since the large-scale arrival of Islam in the region through Malian cleric merchants in the 14th century. Although not initially widely used, it nevertheless provided those fluent in its script with a literacy device that enabled them to exchange written communication, without necessarily being fluent in the Arabic. Interestingly, for many centuries, the sedentary rural and urban population of the Hausa city-states used Arabic as the main literary language, as it was seen as the more prestigious means of communication. It was in fact the semi-nomadic Fulfulde community of Northern Nigeria that wrote its native language in 'Ajami script' than the urban-rural Hausa community. Fulɓe people of Northern Nigeria have a rich literary and poetry tradition..

Since 2003, a standardized derivation of the Arabic script with the Ajami variant, in the Hafs tradition, but with 13 adaptations has been used to write the language. This includes a Fulfulde translation of the Bible as well.

Nigerian Fulfulde is also written with Latin Script in line with the Pan-Nigerian alphabet.

=== Nigerian Fulfulde Ajami alphabet ===
Table below illustrates the Nigerian Fulfulde Ajami alphabet, the yellow highlights indicating letters that are exclusively used for writing loanwords and do not correspond to independent phonemes, 9 in total. Green highlights letters and digraphs that are either adaptations of the 28 original Arabic letters or are brand new letters for phonemes unique to Fulfulde, 13 in total.

4 of the 13 consist of digraphs representing the 4 prenasalized consonants present in Fulfulde. The first letter of the digraph representing a prenasalized consonant cannot take any diacritic, not even a zero-vowel diacritic sukun '◌ْ'.

Nigerian Fulfulde Ajami alphabet
Arabic (Latin) [IPA]	ا ‌( - / ʼ / Aa aa ) [∅]/[ʔ]/[aː]	ب ‌(B b) [b]	ٻ ‌(Ɓ ɓ) [ɓ]	ت ‌(T t) [t]	ث ‌(S s) [s]	ج ‌(J j) [ɟ]
Arabic (Latin) [IPA]	ح ‌(H h) [h]	خ ‌(K k) [k]([x])	د ‌(D d) [d]	ذ ‌(J j) [ɟ]([z])	ر (R r) [ɾ]	ز ‌(J j) [ɟ]([z])
Arabic (Latin) [IPA]	س ‌(S s) [s]	ش ‌(C c) [t͡ʃ]‍~[c]‍	ص ‌(S s) [s]	ض ‌(L l) [l]	ط ‌(Ɗ ɗ) [ɗ]	ظ ‌(J j) [ɟ]([z])
Arabic (Latin) [IPA]	ع ‌(- / ʼ ) [ʔ]	غ ‌(G g) [ɡ]	ݝ ‌(Ŋ ŋ) [ŋ]	ف ‌(F f) [f]	ڤ ‌(P p) [p]	ق ‌(K k) [k]
Arabic (Latin) [IPA]	ک ‌(K k) [k]	ل ‌(L l) [l]	م ‌(M m) [m]	مب ‌(Mb mb) [ᵐb]	ن ‌(N n) [n]	نج ‌(Nj nj) [ᶮɟ]
Arabic (Latin) [IPA]	ند ‌(Nd nd) [ⁿd]	نغ ‌(Ng ng) [ᵑɡ]	ݧـ ݧ ‌(Ny ny) [ɲ]	ه ‌(H h) [h]	و ‌(W w/Oo oo/Uu uu) [w]/[oː]/[uː]	ي ‌(Y y/Ii ii) [j]/[iː]
Arabic (Latin) [IPA]	ىٰ ‌(Ee ee) [eː]	ۑ ‌(Ƴ ƴ) [ʄ]				

Vowel at the beginning of a word
A	E	I	O	U
Short Vowels
اَ	اٜ	اِ	اٛ	اُ
Long Vowels
Aa	Ee	Ii	Oo	Uu
اَا	اٜىٰـ / اٜىٰ	اِيـ / اِي	اٛو	اُو

Vowel-initial syllable; middle or end of a word
A	E	I	O	U
Short Vowels
عَـ / ـعَـ عَ / ـعَ	عٜـ / ـعٜـ عٜ / ـعٜ	عِـ / ـعِـ عِ / ـعِ	عٛـ / ـعٛـ عٛ / ـعٛ	عُـ / ـعُـ عُ / ـعُ
Long Vowels
Aa	Ee	Ii	Oo	Uu
عَا / ـعَا	عٜىٰـ / ـعٜىٰـ عٜىٰ / ـعٜىٰ	عِيـ / ـعِيـ عِي / ـعِي	عٛو / ـعٛو	عُو / ـعُو

Vowel at the middle or end of a word
a	e	i	o	u	∅
Short Vowels
◌َ	◌ٜ	◌ِ	◌ٛ	◌ُ	◌ْ
Long Vowels
aa	ee	ii	oo	uu	
◌َا / ـَا	◌ٜىٰـ / ـٜىٰـ ◌ٜىٰ / ـٜىٰ	◌ِيـ / ـِيـ ◌ِي / ـِي	◌ٛو / ـٛو	◌ُو / ـُو	

=== Fulfulde Latin Alphabet ===
Nigerian Fulfulde Latin alphabet
A a	Aa aa	B b	Mb mb	Ɓ ɓ	C c	D d	Nd nd	Ɗ ɗ	E e	Ee ee	F f	G g	Ng ng	H h	I i	Ii ii	J j	Nj nj
[a]	[aː]	[b]	[ᵐb]	[ɓ]	[t͡ʃ]‍~[c]‍	[d]	[ⁿd]	[ɗ]	[e]	[eː]	[f]	[ɡ]	[ᵑɡ]	[h]	[i]	[iː]	[ɟ]‍	[ᶮɟ]
K k	L l	M m	N n	Ny ny	Ŋ ŋ	O o	Oo oo	P p	R r	S s	T t	U u	Uu uu	W w	X x	Y y	Ƴ ƴ	ʼ
[k]	[l]	[m]	[n]	[ɲ]	[ŋ]	[o]	[oː]	[p]	[r]	[s]	[t]	[u]	[uː]	[w]	[x]	[j]	[jˤ]	[ʔ]

== Sample Text ==
Passage from the Bible, Book of Acts, Chapter 9, verses 4 and 5:

Translation	^{4} He fell to the ground and heard a voice say to him, "Saul, Saul, why do you persecute me?" ^{5} "Who are you, Lord?" Saul asked. "I am Jesus, whom you are persecuting," he replied.
Latin Script	^{4} O yani e leydi, o nani hononde e wi'amo, "Caawulu, Caawulu, ngam ɗume torrataayam?" ^{5} Caawulu wi'i, "Mawɗo, an ɗum moye?" Hononde nden wi'imo, "Min woni Yeesu mo torrataa.
Ajami Script	^{٤} اٛ يَنِ اٜ لٜيْدِ، اٛ نَنِ حٛنٛنْدٜ اٜ وِعَمٛ، «شَاوُلُ، شَاوُلُ، نغَمْ طُمٜ تٛرَّتَايَمْ؟» ^{٥} شَاوُلُ وِعِ، «مَوْطٛ، اَنْ طُمْ مٛيٜ؟» حٛنٛنْدٜ ندٜنْ وِعِمٛ، «مِنْ وٛنِ عيسىٰ (يٜىٰسُ) مٛ تٛرَّتَا؞
