= Pulaar language =

Fula language spoken by Fula and Tukolor peoples

Pulaar
- بولار (Arabic); Pël ݒࣴلْ (Wolof); Peul (French)
- Pulaar ݒُلَارْ Pulaar Fuuta Tooro ݒُلَارْ فُوتَ تࣷورࣷ
- Native to: Mauritania; Senegal; The Gambia
- Ethnicity: Haratine, Fula, Toucouleur
- Native speakers: 6.3 million (2014–2022)
- Language family: Niger–Congo?: Atlantic–Congo; Senegambian; Fula–Wolof; Fula; Western; Pulaar
- Writing system: Adlam; Arabic (Ajami); Fula Latin alphabet

Official status
- Official language in: Mauritania; Senegal

Language codes
- ISO 639-3: fuc
- Glottolog: pula1263

- Person: Pullo 𞤆𞤵𞤤𞥆𞤮
- People: Fulɓe 𞤊𞤵𞤤𞤩𞤫
- Language: Pulaar 𞤆𞤵𞤤𞤢𞥄𞤪

Pulaar (in Latin: pulaar, in Ajami: ݒُلَارْ) is a Senegambian language spoken primarily in Mauritania, Senegal and the Gambia. It is one of the national languages of Mauritania, Senegal and the Gambia and is spoken by more than 6 million people worldwide.

The two main speakers of Pulaar are the Toucouleur people and the Fulɓe (also known as Fulani or Peul) in the Senegal River valley area traditionally known as Futa Tooro. Pulaar is the second most spoken local language in Mauritania and Senegal, being a first language for around 22% of the latter country's population. This correlates with 23.7% of the country in which Fulbe is the population's ethnicity. There are around 28 known dialects of Fula, most of which are mutually intelligible with each other. The Fula dialects, as well as other West African languages, are usually referenced under the umbrella term ‘Fula’. Pulaar as a language, however, is not usually referenced as ‘Fula’. According to Ethnologue there are several dialectal varieties, but all are mutually intelligible.

Pulaar is not to be confused with Pular, another variety of Fula spoken in Guinea (including the Fouta Djallon region). The Pulaar and Pular varieties of Fula are to some extent mutually intelligible.

Pulaar is currently written in primarily in the Latin script. Historically, for centuries, Pulaar has a literary tradition based on the Arabic script, an orthographic tradition now known as "Ajami". More recently, Adlam script for Pulaar has been gaining ground as well (see Fula alphabets).

The word Pulaar translates to 'the language of the Fulɓe' as the stem /pul/ is the singular form of Fulɓe and the suffix /-aar/ means language. The language is believed to have formed in Fuuta Tooro when the ancestors of the Toucouleur people began speaking the language of the Fulɓe. It is then believed that the term Haalpulaar'en (which means 'speakers of the language of Pulaar') was created to apply to non-Fulɓe speakers of Fulɓe, of which the Toucouleur people are the largest demographic.

Map of the Fula languages including Pulaar

== Linguistic features ==
=== Negation ===
The negative accomplished verb form ends in -aani. (This is slightly different from Maasina Fulfulde and Pular.)

=== Noun classes ===
Pulaar contains 21 noun classes. These noun classes can commonly be observed by looking at the suffix of a noun. For example, a noun that is the result of a loan word will typically end in -o (however, human singular nouns such as debbo (meaning woman) also end in -o). The class of the noun will often refer to the actual content of the noun. For example, the ɗam noun class is applied to nouns that describe a liquid. The table below shows the noun classes in Pulaar and what the class indicates the content of the noun to be:

Noun classes
Class	Content of noun
ngo	curved up at edges
ki	straight upright, trees, body parts, abstractions
o	humans, loanwords
nge	celestial bodies, bovines, abstractions
ndu	hollow, inflated, round
ba	animals
ɗam	liquids, abstractions, mass nouns
ɗum	certain loanwords
ka	objects, abstractions
kal	liquids in small quantity
ko	body parts, plants
nde	objects
ndi	male animals, augmentatives, nouns that cannot be counted
ngal	body parts, birds, augmentatives, trees
ngol	things that are long and thin, action nouns
ngel	diminutives
ngu	insects, fish, collectives, abstractions
ɗe	(plural) animals, objects
kon	(plural) diminutives
ɗi	(plural) animals, objects
ɓe	(plural) humans

=== Counting system ===
The Pulaar counting system is base five (a quinary-decimal system) which is similar to the surrounding Niger-Congo languages. The number 7, for example, uses the prefix of joy (5) and the suffix ɗiɗi (2) becoming jeeɗiɗi (5+2). Other languages that use this system in West Africa include Pular, Wolof, Sereer-Sine and East Limba. These quinary-decimal counting languages can be found in the west African regions of Sierra Leone, Guinea and Gambia. Pulaar and Pular possess almost identical words for numbers, in which every number from 1 to 10 share the exact same name except for 5 (joy for Pulaar and jowi for Pular).

=== Vowel suffixes ===
The Pulaar verb system contains multiple suffixes which can be added to verbs to change their cases. These suffixes include the -t suffixes, the -d suffixes, the -n suffixes, and the -r suffixes. When multiple suffixes are used in a single verb, they follow the 'TDNR' order. This means that -t suffixes go before -d suffixes which go before -n suffixes, and -r suffixes are the last in order . There are few exceptions to this rule. An example of this is the word nyaam-n-id-ii. In this word, the -n suffix goes before the -d suffix.

==== -t suffixes ====
the -t suffix is added to verbs in order to change the case of the verb. The allomorphs -t or -it are added to make a verb retaliative, meaning to do in retaliation for a previous action. For example, lata (meaning ‘kick’) adds the allomorph -it to become lat-it-o (meaning ‘kick back’). The allomorphs -t, -it or -ut are added to a verb to make it reversive, meaning to do the opposite of the original verb. For example, taara (meaning ‘wind’) becomes taar-t-a (meaning ‘unwind’). The same allomorphs apply for the repetitive case, meaning the repeating of an action. There are no means of distinguishing between a reversive and a repetitious case other than by observing the context of the sentence. The allomorphs -t and -it are used to make a verb reflexive, which means to make the object of the action the same as the subject. For example, ndaara (meaning ‘look at’) becomes ndaar-t-o (meaning ‘look at oneself’). The allomorphs -t, -ut and -it are used to show that a verb is completed with intensity. For example, yana (meaning ‘fall’) becomes yan-t-a (meaning ‘fall heavily’). For words such as ‘yama (meaning ‘ask’), the intensive form becomes yam-t-a (meaning ‘interrogate’) which is also the same form the repetitive case (meaning ‘ask again’). Therefore, yam-t-a is either one of those cases and therefore cannot be distinguished without taking into account the context of the sentence it is used in.

=== Cultural influences on language ===
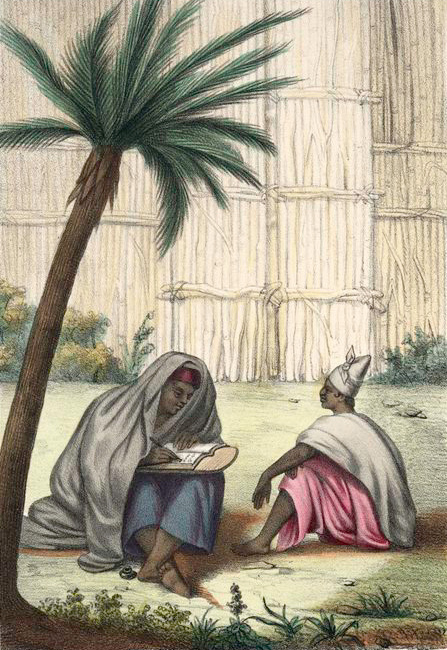
An 1853 painting of a Tukulor man and woman (by David Boilat).

The Toucouleur people (also referred to as Tukulor : fulbe) are one of the largest Pulaar speaking demographics in West Africa. They are an ethnic group of the Futa Tooro region encompassing the middle of the Senegal River. The Toucouleur people are heavily influenced by Islam, being one of the first black African groups to embrace Islam in the 11th century. Therefore, the Pulaar language has influences from Islam. This influence has led to Arabic words being integrated into the Pulaar language. The vocabulary of the Pulaar language is also influenced by the conservative, family-oriented culture of Pulaar. There are Pulaar words which describe relationships between people. The phrase jokkere endam' (literally translated to "following maternal milk") is used to talk about the responsibilities that one has to maintain their relationship with their family. The word musidal is used to describe one's blood relationship to a family. Pulaar's noun classes also indicate the influence of the agricultural lifestyle of Fula people. For example, the nge class of nouns refers to bovines including cow (naage) and heifer (wiige), and the ki class of nouns refer to trees or objects that are straight upright. The noun classes relating to themes of agriculture and farming relate to the Toucouleur economy, which consists mainly of raising of stock, crop cultivation and fishing. The Fulɓe people are known for being a semi-nomadic pastoralist group who have a history of cattle-herding, justifying the bovine noun class.

== Orthography ==
Pulaar today is primarily written in Latin alphabet, with orthographic conventions that are in common for all indigenous languages of Senegal. The Latin alphabet has been standardized in various Senegalese government decrees, the latest of which was issued in 2005.

However, historically, similar to other indigenous languages of the region, such as Wolof language, its first writing system was the adaption of the Arabic Script. The Arabic script is used today as well, albeit in a smaller scale, and only mostly limited to Islamic school teachers and students. The Arabic-based script of Pulaar was set by the government as well, between 1985 and 1990, although never adopted by a decree, as the effort by the Senegalese ministry of education was to be part of a multi-national standardization effort.

Pulaar Latin alphabet
A a	Aa aa	B b	Mb mb	Ɓ ɓ	C c	D d	Nd nd	Ɗ ɗ	E e	Ee ee	F f	G g	Ng ng	H h	I i	Ii ii	J j	Nj nj
[a]	[aː]	[b]	[ᵐb]	[ɓ]	[t͡ʃ]‍~[c]‍	[d]	[ⁿd]	[ɗ]	[e]	[eː]	[f]	[ɡ]	[ᵑɡ]	[h]	[i]	[iː]	[d͡ʒ]~[ɟ]‍	[ᶮd͡ʒ]~[ᶮɟ]
K k	L l	M m	N n	Ñ ñ	Ŋ ŋ	O o	Oo oo	P p	R r	S s	T t	U u	Uu uu	W w	X x	Y y	Ƴ ƴ	’
[k]	[l]	[m]	[n]	[ɲ]	[ŋ]	[o]	[oː]	[p]	[r]	[s]	[t]	[u]	[uː]	[w]	[x]	[j]	[jˤ]	[ʔ]

Pulaar Ajami alphabet
Arabic (Latin) [IPA]	ا ‌( – / ’ / Aa aa ) [∅]/[ʔ]/[aː]	ب ‌(B b) [b]	ݒ ‌(P p) [p]	ࢠ ‌(Ɓ ɓ) [ɓ]	ت ‌(T t) [t]	ݖ ‌(C c) [t͡ʃ]‍~[c]‍
Arabic (Latin) [IPA]	ث ‌(S s) [s]	ج ‌(J j) [d͡ʒ]	ڃ ‌(Ƴ ƴ) [jˤ]	ح ‌(H h) [h]	خ ‌(K k) [k]([x])	د ‌(D d) [d]
Arabic (Latin) [IPA]	ذ ‌(J j) [d͡ʒ]([z])	ر (R r) [r]	ز ‌(J j) [d͡ʒ]([z])	س ‌(S s) [s]	ش ‌(S s) [s]([ʃ])	ص ‌(S s) [s]
Arabic (Latin) [IPA]	ض ‌(L l) [l]	ط ‌(Ɗ ɗ) [ɗ]	ظ ‌(J j) [d͡ʒ]	ع ‌(- / ’ ) [ʔ]	غ ‌(G g) [ɡ]	ݝ ‌(Ŋ ŋ) [ŋ]
Arabic (Latin) [IPA]	ف ‌(F f) [f]	ق ‌(Q q) [q]	ک ‌(K k) [k]	گ ‌(G g) [g]	ل ‌(L l) [l]	م ‌(M m) [m]
Arabic (Latin) [IPA]	ن ‌(N n) [n]	ݧـ ݧ ‌(Ñ ñ) [ɲ]	ه ‌(H h) [h]	و ‌(W w/Oo oo/Uu uu) [w]/[oː]/[uː]	ي ‌(Y y/Ee ee/Ii ii) [j]/[eː]/[iː]	

Vowel at the beginning of a word
A	E	I	O	U
Short Vowels
اَ	اࣹ	اِ	اࣷ	اُ
Long Vowels
Aa	Ee	Ii	Oo	Uu
آ	اࣹيـ / اࣹي	اِيـ / اِي	اࣷو	اُو

Vowel at the middle or end of a word
a	e	i	o	u	∅
Short Vowels
◌َ	◌ࣹ	◌ِ	◌ࣷ	◌ُ	◌ْ
Long Vowels
aa	ee	ii	oo	uu	
◌َا	◌ࣹيـ / ◌ࣹي	◌ِيـ / ◌ِي	◌ࣷو	◌ُو	

Prenasalized consonants are written as a digraph (combination of two consonants). While historically, there were single letter alternatives, these letters are no longer used. Prenasalized consonants are constructed using meem (م) or noon (ن) in combination with other consonants. The letter meem (م) appears in pairs with beh (ب), whereas the letter noon (ن) appears in pairs with dal (د), jeem (ج), and geh (گ).

Prenasalized consonants cannot take the zero-vowel diacritic sukun (◌ْ). If they are at the end of the word and have no vowels, they will take the gemination diacritic shadda (◌ّ).

Some consider these digraphs as their own independent letters.

Pulaar Ajami prenasalized Consonant Digraphs
Forms				Sound represented	Latin equivalent
Isolated	Final	Medial	Initial	Sound represented	Latin equivalent
مب	ـمبّ	ـمبـ	مبـ	[ᵐb]	mb
ند	ـندّ	ـند	ند	[ⁿd]	nd
نج	ـنجّ	ـنجـ	نجـ	[ᶮɟ]	nj
نگ	ـنگّ	ـنگـ	نگـ	[ᵑɡ]	ng

=== Sample Text ===
Article 1 of the Universal Declaration of Human Rights.

Translation	Latin Script	Ajami (Arabic) Script
All human beings are born free and equal in dignity and rights. They are endowed with reason and conscience and should act towards one another in a spirit of brotherhood.	Innama aadeeji fof poti, ndimɗidi e jibinannde to bannge hakkeeji. Eɓe ngoodi miijo e hakkilantaagal ete eɓe poti huufo ndirde e nder ɓ iynguyummaagu.	اِنَّمَ آدࣹجِ فࣷفْ ݒࣷتِ، ندِمْطِدِ اࣹ جِبِنَندّࣹ تࣷ بَنگّࣹ حَقّࣹجِ. اࣹࢠࣹ نگࣷودِ مِيجࣷ اࣹ حَقِّلَنْتَاگَلْ اࣹتࣹ اࣹࢠࣹ ݒࣷتِ هُوفࣷ ندِرْدࣹ اࣹ ندࣹرْ ࢠْ اِيْنگُيُمَّاگُ.

== Decline ==
As the Pulaar language is a declining language in West Africa, the surrounding Niger-Congo languages, such as Wolof, are increasing in speakers instead. A 1987–1988 study of bilingual North Senegalese communities found that the use of Pulaar was decreasing in the younger generation. Pulaar was being replaced by Wolof and French loan words. John Hames has argued that the reason for this decline in Pulaar in favour for Wolof and French has come down to the fact that the Wolof culture and Senegalese identity are strongly related. In Western Africa, Wolof language is often used in "major pop cultural and entertainment products and radio broadcast content". Wolof interpreters were used from the late sixteenth century with the Portuguese, therefore Wolof maintained a position in West Africa as the language of trade. Wolof also hold religious importance in West Africa as the Mouride Muslim Sufi order holds its capital in Touba, which is a predominately Wolof-speaking zone. The Mouride population constitutes 3-5 million people in Senegal (the population of Senegal is around 16 million). Fiona McLaughlin argues that this economic and cultural hegemony that the Wolof have is at the expense of the Pulaar language. She states that people in Senegal will call themselves Wolof, despite not being ethnically Wolof, because it is the only language that they learned. John Hames claims that the prevalence of Wolof in Senegalese culture as well as the lack of government intervention to maintain Pulaar as a contemporary language has led to its decline.

John Hames has argued that the regime of Mauritanian President Moktar Ould Daddah has helped decrease the prevalence of Pulaar. Hames states that the Moor supportive presidency of Daddah led to an increase of Arab education over education of native languages. One of the more notable examples of this is when the Mauritanian government officially passed a law in 1965 that made it mandatory to teach Arabic during primary and secondary education.

=== Efforts to revive language ===
Pulaar is the second most spoken native language in Mauritania, after Arabic. The Association pour la Renaissance du Pulaar- Republique Islamique de Mauritanie (ARP-RIM) was established to teach Pulaar literacy in Mauritania. The organization received increased government funding after the coup d'état of the then President of Mauritania, Moktar Ould Daddah in the late 1970s. The programs which the ARP-RIM participated in included campaigns to increase Pulaar literacy, this was done by creating more radio programs which taught the local languages of Mauritania. As The ARP-RIM also focused on applying the Pulaar language to primary education as it allocated Pulaar teachers to public schools in Mauritania. The efforts to revive Pulaar in Mauritania were reduced after the 1984 coup d'état of then President of Mauritania, Mohamed Khouna Ould Haidalla, by Colonel Maaouya Ould Sid’Ahmed Taya. In response to the coup d'état, the Manifesto of the Oppressed Black Mauritanian was published in 1986 which criticized the perceived power and influence of the Arab "minority" in Mauritania. After the publishing of this manifesto, crackdowns by the Government against Pulaar speaker and teachers increased. Political imprisonments against the Pulaar people increased, notably Djigo Tafsirou, who was a Pulaar language activist, was arrested and possibly died in detention after 2 years of imprisonment. Recently, there have been efforts by Mauritanian activists to elevate the status of Pulaar to official language, similar to Arabic.

Pulaar is one of the national languages of Senegal alongside 13 others. It was admitted as an official language of Senegal by Presidential decree in 1971. The Ministère de l'Éducation de Base et des Langues Nationales in 1986, (becoming the Ministère de l'Alphabétisation et des Langues Nationales in 2001) was established by the Senegal government as a means to boost the influence of the local languages of Senegal (including Pulaar). It did this by increasing the literacy amongst its users. Non-government companies that have aided the influence of the Pulaar language include the cotton producing company in West Africa, SODEFITEX. SODEFITEX has implemented local languages in their training courses for local farmers. A way this has been achieved is by creating radio programs in local languages to reinforce Pulaar to local employees. International development agencies have increasingly decided to focus on the use of local languages in West Africa to communicate ideas and governance. This is done as a means to increase local governance in regional areas of West Africa. These agencies include World Vision International and Tostan. For instance, the provision of basic literacy of Pulaar is one of the main focuses of Tostan. The government of Senegal has also had talks about creating an academy for national languages.

Mauritanian mathematician Mouhamadou Sy has published two math textbooks in Pulaar.
