= Western Niger Fulfulde =

Variety of the Fula language

- Gorgal Niiser Fulfulde غٛرْغَلْ نِيسٜرْ فُلْفُلْدٜ
- Distribution of Fulɓe people in Western Niger Area
- Native to: Niger, Benin, Burkina Faso
- Ethnicity: Fula
- Native speakers: 3.1 million (2021)
- Language family: Niger–Congo?: Atlantic–Congo; Senegambian; Fula–Wolof; Fula; East Central; Western Niger Fulfulde
- Dialects: Dallol; Bitinkoore; Tera
- Writing system: Arabic (Ajami); Latin

Language codes
- ISO 639-3: fuh
- Glottolog: west2454

Western Niger Fulfulde, also known as Gorgal Niiser Fulfulde (Ajami: غٛرْغَلْ نِيسٜرْ فُلْفُلْدٜ) is a variety of the Fula language. With 3 million speakers, it is spoken mainly in Niger and Burkina Faso, as well as by a small number of speakers in Benin. It has SOV word order and is closely related to other varieties of Fula spoken in Niger.

In terms of phonology, the language is characterized by a system of vowels and consonants, and it employs a tonal system, where pitch variations play a crucial role in distinguishing lexical meaning. The consonantal inventory includes stops, fricatives, nasals, and glides. Additionally, Western Niger Fulfulde utilizes vowel harmony, where the vowels within a word harmonize in terms of features such as frontness or rounding.

Syntactically, the language employs a subject-verb-object (SVO) word order, with the subject typically preceding the verb and the object following. However, word order can be flexible due to the use of nominal and verbal markers that convey grammatical relations. Western Niger Fulfulde exhibits agglutinative characteristics, where affixes are added to a root word to convey various grammatical meanings, such as tense, aspect, and mood. Verbal morphology is particularly complex, with a variety of affixes indicating person, number, and gender.

The language employs a system of noun class, which categorizes nouns into different classes, each marked by a specific prefix. These classes convey information about gender, and agreement markers on verbs and adjectives must match the noun class of the subject. Additionally, Western Niger Fulfulde employs extensive use of proverbs and idiomatic expressions.
