= ISO 639:i =

List of ISO 639-3 language codes starting with I

This is a list of ISO 639-3 language codes starting with I.

Index | a | b | c | d | e | f | g | h | i | j | k | l | m | n | o | p | q | r | s | t | u | v | w | x | y | z

Abbreviations are used in the table as follows:

- Scope: I = individual language, M = macrolanguage, S = special code
- Type: C = constructed, E = extinct (in recent times), H = historical (distinct from its modern form), L = living, S = special code

Deprecated codes are enclosed in (parentheses).

The column Family contains the generic English name of the language's family or macrolanguage.

ISO 639 codes			Scope/Type	Family	Language names	
639-3	639-1	639-2/B	Scope/Type	Family	Native	ISO name
iai			I/L			Iaai
ian			I/L			Iatmul
(iap)			I/L	spurious language		Iapama
iar			I/L			Purari
iba		iba	I/L			Iban
ibb			I/L			Ibibio
ibd			I/L			Iwaidja
ibe			I/L			Akpes
ibg			I/L			Ibanag
ibh			I/L	Austronesian		Bih
(ibi)			I/L			Ibilo
ibl			I/L			Ibaloi
ibm			I/L			Agoi
ibn			I/L			Ibino
ibo	ig	ibo	I/L	Niger–Congo	Igbo	Igbo
ibr			I/L			Ibuoro
ibu			I/L			Ibu
iby			I/L			Ibani
ica			I/L			Ede Ica
ich			I/L			Etkywan
icl			I/L			Icelandic Sign Language
icr			I/L			Islander Creole English
ida			I/L			Idakho-Isukha-Tiriki; Luidakho-Luisukha-Lutirichi
idb			I/L			Indo-Portuguese
idc			I/L			Ajiya; Idon
idd			I/L			Ede Idaca
ide			I/L			Idere
idi			I/L			Idi
ido	io	ido	I/C	constructed	Ido	Ido
idr			I/L			Indri
ids			I/L			Idesa
idt			I/L			Idaté
idu			I/L			Idoma
ifa			I/L			Amganad Ifugao
ifb			I/L			Ayangan Ifugao; Batad Ifugao
ife			I/L			Ifè
iff			I/E			Ifo
ifk			I/L			Tuwali Ifugao
ifm			I/L			Teke-Fuumu
ifu			I/L			Mayoyao Ifugao
ify			I/L			Keley-I Kallahan
igb			I/L			Ebira
ige			I/L			Igede
igg			I/L			Igana
igl			I/L			Igala
igm			I/L			Kanggape
ign			I/L			Ignaciano
igo			I/L			Isebe
igs			I/C	constructed		Interglossa
igw			I/L			Igwe
ihb			I/L			Iha Based Pidgin
ihi			I/L			Ihievbe
ihp			I/L			Iha
ihw			I/E			Bidhawal
iii	ii	iii	I/L	Sino-Tibetan	ꆈꌠꉙ	Nuosu; Sichuan Yi
iin			I/E			Thiin
ijc			I/L			Izon
ije			I/L			Biseni
ijj			I/L			Ede Ije
ijn			I/L			Kalabari
ijs			I/L			Southeast Ijo
ike			I/L	Eskimo–Aleut		Eastern Canadian Inuktitut
ikh			I/L	Niger–Congo		Ikhin-Arokho
iki			I/L			Iko
ikk			I/L			Ika
ikl			I/L			Ikulu
iko			I/L			Olulumo-Ikom
ikp			I/L			Ikpeshi
ikr			I/E			Ikaranggal
iks			I/L			Inuit Sign Language
ikt			I/L	Eskimo–Aleut		Inuinnaqtun; Western Canadian Inuktitut
iku	iu	iku	M/L	Eskimo–Aleut	ᐃᓄᒃᑎᑐᑦ	Inuktitut
ikv			I/L			Iku-Gora-Ankwa
ikw			I/L			Ikwere
ikx			I/L			Ik
ikz			I/L			Ikizu
ila			I/L			Ile Ape
ilb			I/L			Ila
ile	ie	ile	I/C	constructed	Interlingue	Interlingue; Occidental
ilg			I/E			Garig-Ilgar
ili			I/L			Ili Turki
ilk			I/L			Ilongot
(ill)			I/L			Iranun
ilm			I/L			Iranun (Malaysia)
ilo		ilo	I/L		ilokano	Iloko
ilp			I/L			Iranun (Philippines)
ils			I/L			International Sign
ilu			I/L			Ili'uun
ilv			I/L			Ilue
(ilw)			I/L			Talur
ima			I/L	Dravidian		Mala Malasar
(ime)			I/L	spurious language		Imeraguen
imi			I/L			Anamgura
iml			I/E			Miluk
imn			I/L			Imonda
imo			I/L			Imbongu
imr			I/L			Imroing
ims			I/H			Marsian
imt			I/L	Nilo-Saharan		Imotong
imy			I/H			Milyan
ina	ia	ina	I/C	constructed	interlingua	Interlingua (International Auxiliary Language Association)
inb			I/L			Inga
ind	id	ind	I/L	Austronesian	bahasa Indonesia	Indonesian
ing			I/L			Degexit'an
inh		inh	I/L		гӀалгӀай	Ingush
inj			I/L			Jungle Inga
inl			I/L			Indonesian Sign Language
inm			I/H			Minaean
inn			I/L			Isinai
ino			I/L			Inoke-Yate
inp			I/L			Iñapari
ins			I/L			Indian Sign Language
int			I/L	Sino-Tibetan		Intha
inz			I/E			Ineseño
ior			I/L			Inor
iou			I/L			Tuma-Irumu
iow			I/E			Iowa-Oto
ipi			I/L			Ipili
ipk	ik	ipk	M/L	Eskimo–Aleut	Iñupiaq	Inupiaq
ipo			I/L			Ipiko
iqu			I/L			Iquito
iqw			I/L			Ikwo
ire			I/L			Iresim
irh			I/L			Irarutu
iri			I/L			Irigwe; Rigwe
irk			I/L			Iraqw
irn			I/L			Irántxe
irr			I/L	Austroasiatic		Ir
iru			I/L			Irula
irx			I/L			Kamberau
iry			I/L			Iraya
isa			I/L			Isabi
isc			I/L			Isconahua
isd			I/L			Isnag
ise			I/L			Italian Sign Language
isg			I/L			Irish Sign Language
ish			I/L			Esan
isi			I/L			Nkem-Nkum
isk			I/L			Ishkashimi
isl	is	ice	I/L	Indo-European	íslenska	Icelandic
ism			I/L			Masimasi
isn			I/L			Isanzu
iso			I/L			Isoko
isr			I/L			Israeli Sign Language
ist			I/L			Istriot
isu			I/L			Isu (Menchum Division)
isv			I/C	constructed	medžuslovjansky, меджусловјанскы	Interslavic
ita	it	ita	I/L	Indo-European	italiano	Italian
itb			I/L			Binongan Itneg
itd			I/L	Austronesian		Southern Tidung
ite			I/E			Itene
iti			I/L			Inlaod Itneg
itk			I/L			Judeo-Italian
itl			I/L		Итэнмэн	Itelmen
itm			I/L			Itu Mbon Uzo
ito			I/L			Itonama
itr			I/L			Iteri
its			I/L			Isekiri
itt			I/L			Maeng Itneg
(itu)			I/L			Itutang
itv			I/L			Itawit
itw			I/L			Ito
itx			I/L			Itik
ity			I/L			Moyadan Itneg
itz			I/L			Itzá
ium			I/L	Hmong–Mien	Iu Mienh	Iu Mien
ivb			I/L			Ibatan
ivv			I/L			Ivatan
iwk			I/L			I-Wak
iwm			I/L			Iwam
iwo			I/L			Iwur
iws			I/L			Sepik Iwam
ixc			I/L			Ixcatec
(ixi)			I/L			Nebaj Ixil
(ixj)			I/L			Chajul Ixil
ixl			I/L			Ixil
iya			I/L			Iyayu
iyo			I/L			Mesaka
iyx			I/L			Yaka (Congo)
izh			I/L		ižoran keeli	Ingrian
(izi)			I/L			Izi-Ezaa-Ikwo-Mgbo
izm			I/L	Niger–Congo		Kizamani
izr			I/L			Izere
izz			I/L			Izii

== Sources ==
- "ISO 639-2 Registration Authority". Library of Congress.
- "ISO 639-3 Registration Authority". SIL International.
- Lewis, M. Paul; Simons, Gary F.; Fennig, Charles D., eds. (2016). "Ethnologue: Languages of the World" (19th ed.). Dallas, Texas: SIL International.
