= ISO 639:u =

List of ISO 639-3 language codes starting with U

This is a list of ISO 639-3 language codes starting with U.

Index | a | b | c | d | e | f | g | h | i | j | k | l | m | n | o | p | q | r | s | t | u | v | w | x | y | z

Abbreviations are used in the table as follows:

- Scope: I = individual language, M = macrolanguage, S = special code
- Type: C = constructed, E = extinct (in recent times), H = historical (distinct from its modern form), L = living, S = special code

Deprecated codes are enclosed in (parentheses).

The column Family contains the generic English name of the language's family or macrolanguage.

| ISO 639 codes | | | Scope/Type | Family | Language names | |
| 639-3 | 639-1 | 639-2/B | Scope/Type | Family | Native | ISO name |
|---|---|---|---|---|---|---|
| uam | | | I/E | | | Uamué |
| uan | | | I/L | | | Kuan |
| uar | | | I/L | | | Tairuma |
| uba | | | I/L | | | Ubang |
| ubi | | | I/L | | | Ubi |
| ubl | | | I/L | | | Buhi'non Bikol |
| (ubm) | | | I/L | spurious language | | Upper Baram Kenyah |
| ubr | | | I/L | | | Ubir |
| ubu | | | I/L | | | Umbu-Ungu |
| uby | | | I/E | | atʷaχəbza | Ubykh |
| uda | | | I/L | | | Uda |
| ude | | | I/L | | | Udihe |
| udg | | | I/L | Dravidian | | Muduga |
| udi | | | I/L | | удин | Udi |
| udj | | | I/L | | | Ujir |
| udl | | | I/L | | | Wuzlam |
| udm | | udm | I/L | Uralic | удмурт | Udmurt |
| udu | | | I/L | | | Uduk |
| ues | | | I/L | | | Kioko |
| ufi | | | I/L | | | Ufim |
| uga | | uga | I/H | | | Ugaritic |
| ugb | | | I/E | | | Kuku-Ugbanh |
| uge | | | I/L | | | Ughele |
| ugh | | | I/L | Northeast Caucasian | | Kubachi |
| ugn | | | I/L | | | Ugandan Sign Language |
| ugo | | | I/L | Sino-Tibetan | Ugong | Ugong |
| ugy | | | I/L | | | Uruguayan Sign Language |
| uha | | | I/L | | | Uhami |
| uhn | | | I/L | | | Damal |
| uig | ug | uig | I/L | Turkic | ئۇيغۇرچە | Uighur; Uyghur |
| uis | | | I/L | | | Uisai |
| uiv | | | I/L | | | Iyive |
| uji | | | I/L | Niger–Congo? | Tanjijili | Tanjijili |
| uka | | | I/L | | | Kaburi |
| ukg | | | I/L | | | Ukuriguma |
| ukh | | | I/L | | | Ukhwejo |
| uki | | | I/L | | | Kui (India) |
| ukk | | | I/L | Austroasiatic | | Muak Sa-aak |
| ukl | | | I/L | | | Ukrainian Sign Language |
| ukp | | | I/L | | | Ukpe-Bayobiri |
| ukq | | | I/L | | | Ukwa |
| ukr | uk | ukr | I/L | Indo-European | українська | Ukrainian |
| uks | | | I/L | | | Kaapor Sign Language; Urubú-Kaapor Sign Language |
| uku | | | I/L | | | Ukue |
| ukv | | | I/L | | | Kuku |
| ukw | | | I/L | | | Ukwuani-Aboh-Ndoni |
| uky | | | I/E | | | Kuuk-Yak |
| ula | | | I/L | | | Fungwa |
| ulb | | | I/L | | | Ulukwumi |
| ulc | | | I/L | | | Ulch |
| ule | | | I/E | | | Lule |
| ulf | | | I/L | | | Afra; Usku |
| uli | | | I/L | | | Ulithian |
| ulk | | | I/L | | | Meriam Mir |
| ull | | | I/L | | | Ullatan |
| ulm | | | I/L | | | Ulumanda' |
| uln | | | I/L | | | Unserdeutsch |
| ulu | | | I/L | Austronesian | | Uma' Lung |
| ulw | | | I/L | | | Ulwa |
| uly | | | I/L | Afro-Asiatic | | Buli |
| uma | | | I/L | | | Umatilla |
| umb | | umb | I/L | | | Umbundu |
| umc | | | I/H | | | Marrucinian |
| umd | | | I/E | | | Umbindhamu |
| umg | | | I/E | | | Morrobalama; Umbuygamu |
| umi | | | I/L | | | Ukit |
| umm | | | I/L | | | Umon |
| umn | | | I/L | | | Makyan Naga |
| umo | | | I/E | | | Umotína |
| ump | | | I/L | | | Umpila |
| umr | | | I/E | | | Umbugarla |
| ums | | | I/L | | | Pendau |
| umu | | | I/L | | | Munsee |
| una | | | I/L | | | North Watut |
| und | | und | S/S | | | Undetermined |
| une | | | I/L | | | Uneme |
| ung | | | I/L | | | Ngarinyin |
| uni | | | I/L | Skou | | Uni |
| unk | | | I/L | | | Enawené-Nawé |
| unm | | | I/E | | | Unami |
| unn | | | I/L | | | Kurnai |
| (unp) | | | I/L | | | Worora |
| unr | | | I/L | | | Mundari |
| unu | | | I/L | | | Unubahe |
| unx | | | I/L | | | Munda |
| unz | | | I/L | | | Unde Kaili |
| (uok) | | | I/L | | | Uokha |
| uon | | | I/E | Austronesian | | Kulon |
| upi | | | I/L | | | Umeda |
| upv | | | I/L | | | Uripiv-Wala-Rano-Atchin |
| ura | | | I/L | | | Urarina |
| urb | | | I/L | | | Kaapor; Urubú-Kaapor |
| urc | | | I/E | | | Urningangg |
| urd | ur | urd | I/L | Indo-European | اردو | Urdu |
| ure | | | I/L | | | Uru |
| urf | | | I/E | | | Uradhi |
| urg | | | I/L | | | Urigina |
| urh | | | I/L | | | Urhobo |
| uri | | | I/L | | | Urim |
| urk | | | I/L | | | Urak Lawoi' |
| url | | | I/L | | | Urali |
| urm | | | I/L | | | Urapmin |
| urn | | | I/L | | | Uruangnirin |
| uro | | | I/L | | | Ura (Papua New Guinea) |
| urp | | | I/L | | | Uru-Pa-In |
| urr | | | I/L | | | Lehalurup; Löyöp |
| urt | | | I/L | | | Urat |
| uru | | | I/E | | | Urumi |
| urv | | | I/E | | | Uruava |
| urw | | | I/L | | | Sop |
| urx | | | I/L | | | Urimo |
| ury | | | I/L | | | Orya |
| urz | | | I/L | | | Uru-Eu-Wau-Wau |
| usa | | | I/L | | | Usarufa |
| ush | | | I/L | | | Ushojo |
| usi | | | I/L | Sino-Tibetan | | Usui |
| usk | | | I/L | | | Usaghade |
| usp | | | I/L | | | Uspanteco |
| uss | | | I/L | Niger–Congo | | us-Saare |
| usu | | | I/L | | | Uya |
| uta | | | I/L | | | Otank |
| ute | | | I/L | | | Ute-Southern Paiute |
| uth | | | I/L | Niger–Congo | | ut-Hun |
| utp | | | I/L | | | Amba (Solomon Islands) |
| utr | | | I/L | | | Etulo |
| utu | | | I/L | | | Utu |
| uum | | | I/L | | Урум | Urum |
| (uun) | | | I/L | | | Kulon-Pazeh |
| uur | | | I/L | | | Ura (Vanuatu) |
| uuu | | | I/L | | | U |
| uve | | | I/L | | | Fagauvea; West Uvean |
| uvh | | | I/L | | | Uri |
| uvl | | | I/L | | | Lote |
| uwa | | | I/L | | | Kuku-Uwanh |
| uya | | | I/L | | | Doko-Uyanga |
| uzb | uz | uzb | M/L | Turkic | Ўзбек | Uzbek |
| uzn | | | I/L | | | Northern Uzbek |
| uzs | | | I/L | | | Southern Uzbek |

== Sources ==
- "ISO 639-2 Registration Authority". Library of Congress.
- "ISO 639-3 Registration Authority". SIL International.
- Lewis, M. Paul; Simons, Gary F.; Fennig, Charles D., eds. (2016). "Ethnologue: Languages of the World" (19th ed.). Dallas, Texas: SIL International.
