= ISO 639:e =

List of ISO 639-3 language codes starting with E

This is a list of ISO 639-3 language codes starting with E.

Index | a | b | c | d | e | f | g | h | i | j | k | l | m | n | o | p | q | r | s | t | u | v | w | x | y | z

Abbreviations are used in the table as follows:

- Scope: I = individual language, M = macrolanguage, S = special code
- Type: C = constructed, E = extinct (in recent times), H = historical (distinct from its modern form), L = living, S = special code

Deprecated codes are enclosed in (parentheses).

The column Family contains the generic English name of the language's family or macrolanguage.

ISO 639 codes			Scope/Type	Family	Language names	
639-3	639-1	639-2/B	Scope/Type	Family	Native	ISO name
eaa			I/E	Pama–Nyungan		Karenggapa
ebc			I/L	Austronesian		Beginci
ebg			I/L	Niger–Congo?		Ebughu
ebk			I/L	Austronesian		Eastern Bontok
ebo			I/L	Niger–Congo?		Teke-Ebo
ebr			I/L	Niger–Congo?	Cama	Ebrié
ebu			I/L	Niger–Congo?	Kîembu	Embu; Kiembu
ecr			I/H	unclassified		Eteocretan
ecs			I/L	Andean Sign?		Ecuadorian Sign Language
ecy			I/H	unclassified		Eteocypriot
eee			I/L	mixed language	E	E
efa			I/L	Niger–Congo?		Efai
efe			I/L	Central Sudanic	Efé	Efe
efi		efi	I/L	Niger–Congo?		Efik
ega			I/L	Niger–Congo?		Ega
egl			I/L	Indo-European	emigliàṅ	Emilian
egm			I/L	Niger–Congo?		Benamanga
ego			I/L	Niger–Congo?		Eggon
egy		egy	I/H	Afro-Asiatic	r Z1 n km m t O49 r n km.t	Egyptian (Ancient)
ehs			I/L	isolate		Miyakubo Sign Language
ehu			I/L	Niger–Congo?		Ehueun
eip			I/L	Trans–New Guinea	Lik	Eipomek
eit			I/L	Torricelli		Eitiep
eiv			I/L	North Bougainville	Lik	Askopan
eja			I/L	Niger–Congo?		Ejamat
eka		eka	I/L	Niger–Congo?		Ekajuk
(ekc)			I/E	spurious language		Eastern Karnic
eke			I/L	Niger–Congo?		Ekit
ekg			I/L	Trans–New Guinea	Mee	Ekari
eki			I/L	Niger–Congo?		Eki
ekk			I/L	Uralic	eesti keel	Standard Estonian
ekl			I/L	Austroasiatic	হর hor	Kol; Kol (Bangladesh)
ekm			I/L	Niger–Congo?		Elip
eko			I/L	Niger–Congo?	Ekoti	Koti
ekp			I/L	Niger–Congo?	ẹkpeye	Ekpeye
ekr			I/L	Niger–Congo?	Yache	Yace
eky			I/L	Sino-Tibetan		Eastern Kayah
ele			I/L	Torricelli		Elepi
elh			I/L	Eastern Sudanic		El Hugeirat
eli			I/E	Niger–Congo?		Nding
elk			I/L	Torricelli		Elkei
ell	el	gre	I/L	Indo-European	Ελληνικά Elliniká, Νέα Ελληνικά Néa Elliniká	Modern Greek (1453–)
elm			I/L	Niger–Congo?		Eleme
elo			I/L	Afro-Asiatic		El Molo
(elp)			I/L	spurious language		Elpaputih
elu			I/L	Austronesian		Elu
elx		elx	I/H	isolate		Elamite
ema			I/L	Niger–Congo?		Emai-Iuleha-Ora
emb			I/L	Austronesian		Embaloh
eme			I/L	Tupian		Emerillon
emg			I/L	Sino-Tibetan		Eastern Meohang
emi			I/L	Austronesian		Mussau-Emira
emk			I/L	Niger–Congo?		Eastern Maninkakan
(eml)			I/L	Indo-European	emigliàn e rumagnòl	Emiliano-Romagnolo
emm			I/E	Comecrudan		Mamulique
emn			I/L	Niger–Congo?		Eman
(emo)			I/E	spurious language		Emok
emp			I/L	Chocoan		Northern Emberá
emq			I/L	Sino-Tibetan		Eastern Minyag
ems			I/L	Eskaluet		Pacific Gulf Yupik
emu			I/L	Dravidian		Eastern Muria
emw			I/L	Austronesian		Emplawas
emx			I/L	mixed language		Erromintxela
emy			I/H	Mayan		Epigraphic Mayan
emz			I/L	Niger–Congo?		Mbessa
ena			I/L	Trans–New Guinea		Apali
enb			I/L	Nilo-Saharan?		Markweeta
enc			I/L	Kra–Dai		En
end			I/L	Austronesian		Ende
enf			I/L	Uralic		Forest Enets
eng	en	eng	I/L	Indo-European	English	English
enh			I/L	Uralic		Tundra Enets
(eni)			I/L	Austronesian		Enim
enl			I/L	Mascoian		Enlhet
enm		enm	I/H	Indo-European	Englisch	Middle English (1100–1500)
enn			I/L	Niger–Congo?		Engenni
eno			I/L	Austronesian		Enggano
enq			I/L	Trans–New Guinea		Enga
enr			I/L	Pauwasi		Emem; Emumu
enu			I/L	Sino-Tibetan	Ximoluo	Enu
env			I/L	Niger–Congo?		Enwan (Edo State)
enw			I/L	Niger–Congo?		Enwan (Akwa Ibom State)
enx			I/L	Mascoian		Enxet
eot			I/L	Niger–Congo?		Beti (Côte d'Ivoire)
epi			I/L	Niger–Congo?		Epie
epo	eo	epo	I/C	constructed	Esperanto	Esperanto
era			I/L	Dravidian	எரவல்லன்	Eravallan
erg			I/L	Austronesian		Sie
erh			I/L	Niger–Congo?		Eruwa
eri			I/L	Trans–New Guinea		Ogea
erk			I/L	Austronesian		South Efate
ero			I/L	Sino-Tibetan		Horpa
err			I/E	isolate		Erre
ers			I/L	Sino-Tibetan		Ersu
ert			I/L	Lakes Plain		Eritai
erw			I/L	Austronesian		Erokwanas
ese			I/L	Tacanan		Ese Ejja
esg			I/L	Dravidian		Aheri Gondi
esh			I/L	Indo-European		Eshtehardi
esi			I/L	Eskaluet		North Alaskan Inupiatun
esk			I/L	Eskaluet		Northwest Alaska Inupiatun
esl			I/L	Arab sign		Egypt Sign Language
esm			I/E	Niger–Congo?		Esuma
esn			I/L	isolate		Salvadoran Sign Language
eso			I/L	French sign		Estonian Sign Language
esq			I/E	isolate		Esselen
ess			I/L	Eskaluet		Central Siberian Yupik
est	et	est	M/L	Uralic	eesti	Estonian
esu			I/L	Eskaluet		Central Yupik
esy			I/L	constructed		Eskayan
etb			I/L	Niger–Congo?		Etebi
etc			I/E	Algic		Etchemin
eth			I/L	French sign		Ethiopian Sign Language
etn			I/L	Austronesian		Eton (Vanuatu)
eto			I/L	Niger–Congo?		Eton (Cameroon)
etr			I/L	Trans–New Guinea		Edolo
ets			I/L	Niger–Congo?		Yekhee
ett			I/H	Tyrsenian		Etruscan
etu			I/L	Niger–Congo?		Ejagham
etx			I/L	Niger–Congo?		Eten
etz			I/L	Mairasi		Semimi
eud			I/E	Uto-Aztecan		Eudeve
(eur)			I/C	spurious language	Europanto	Europanto
eus	eu	baq	I/L	isolate	euskara	Basque
eve			I/L	Tungusic	эвэды	Even
evh			I/L	Niger–Congo?		Uvbie
evn			I/L	Tungusic	орочон	Evenki
ewe	ee	ewe	I/L	Niger–Congo?	Eʋegbe	Ewe
ewo		ewo	I/L	Niger–Congo?		Ewondo
ext			I/L	Indo-European	estremeñu	Extremaduran
eya			I/E	Na-Dené		Eyak
eyo			I/L	Eastern Sudanic		Keiyo
eza			I/L	Niger–Congo?		Ezaa
eze			I/L	Niger–Congo?		Uzekwe

== Sources ==
- "ISO 639-2 Registration Authority". Library of Congress.
- "ISO 639-3 Registration Authority". SIL International.
- Lewis, M. Paul; Simons, Gary F.; Fennig, Charles D., eds. (2016). "Ethnologue: Languages of the World" (19th ed.). Dallas, Texas: SIL International.
