= ISO 639:o =

List of ISO 639-3 language codes starting with O

This is a list of ISO 639-3 language codes starting with O.

Index | a | b | c | d | e | f | g | h | i | j | k | l | m | n | o | p | q | r | s | t | u | v | w | x | y | z

Abbreviations are used in the table as follows:

- Scope: I = individual language, M = macrolanguage, S = special code
- Type: C = constructed, E = extinct (in recent times), H = historical (distinct from its modern form), L = living, S = special code

Deprecated codes are enclosed in (parentheses).

The column Family contains the generic English name of the language's family or macrolanguage.

ISO 639 codes			Scope/Type	Family	Language names	
639-3	639-1	639-2/B	Scope/Type	Family	Native	ISO name
oaa			I/L			Orok
oac			I/L			Oroch
oak			I/L	Indo-European	নোয়াখাইল্লা	Noakhali; Noakhailla
oar			I/H	Afro-Asiatic		Ancient Aramaic (up to 700 BCE); Old Aramaic (up to 700 BCE)
oav			I/H	Northeast Caucasian	اوار ماض	Old Avar
obi			I/E			Obispeño
obk			I/L			Southern Bontok
obl			I/L			Oblo
obm			I/H			Moabite
obo			I/L			Obo Manobo
obr			I/H	Sino-Tibetan		Old Burmese
obt			I/H	Indo-European	old brezhoneg	Old Breton
obu			I/L			Obulom
oca			I/L			Ocaina
(occ)			I/C			Occidental
och			I/H	Sino-Tibetan		Old Chinese
oci	oc	oci	I/L	Indo-European	occitan	Occitan (post 1500)
ocm			I/H	Austronesian		Old Cham
oco			I/H	Indo-European	old Kernewek	Old Cornish
ocu			I/L			Atzingo Matlatzinca
oda			I/L			Odut
odk			I/L			Od
odt			I/H	Indo-European	*thiudisc	Old Dutch
odu			I/L			Odual
ofo			I/E			Ofo
ofs			I/H	Indo-European	Frīsesk	Old Frisian
ofu			I/L			Efutop
ogb			I/L			Ogbia
ogc			I/L			Ogbah
oge			I/H	Kartvelian	ႤႬႠჂ ႵႠႰႧႭჃႪႨ	Old Georgian
ogg			I/L			Ogbogolo
(ogn)			I/L			Ogan
ogo			I/L			Khana
ogu			I/L			Ogbronuagum
oht			I/H	Indo-European	𒌷𒉌𒅆𒇷	Old Hittite
ohu			I/H	Uralic		Old Hungarian
oia			I/L			Oirata
oie			I/L	Nilo-Saharan		Okolie
oin			I/L			Inebu One
ojb			I/L		Anishinaabemowin (Ojibwemowin)	Northwestern Ojibwa
ojc			I/L		Anishinaabemowin (Ojibwemowin)	Central Ojibwa
ojg			I/L		Nishnaabemwin (Jibwemwin)	Eastern Ojibwa
oji	oj	oji	M/L	Cree	ᐊᓂᔑᓇᐯᒧᐎᓐ (Anishinaabemowin)	Ojibwa
ojp			I/H	Japonic	上代日本語; 大和言葉	Old Japanese
ojs			I/L		ᐊᓂᔑᓂᓂᒧᐎᓐ (Anishininiimowin)	Severn Ojibwa
ojv			I/L			Ontong Java
ojw			I/L		Anihšināpēmowin (Nakawēmowin)	Western Ojibwa
oka			I/L			Okanagan
okb			I/L			Okobo
okc			I/L	Niger–Congo		Kobo
okd			I/L			Okodia
oke			I/L			Okpe (Southwestern Edo)
okg			I/E			Koko Babangk
okh			I/L			Koresh-e Rostam
oki			I/L	Nilo-Saharan?	Okiek	Okiek
okj			I/E			Oko-Juwoi
okk			I/L			Kwamtim One
okl			I/E	village sign		Old Kentish Sign Language
okm			I/H			Middle Korean (10th-16th cent.)
okn			I/L			Oki-No-Erabu
oko			I/H	Koreanic	Silla(n); 고대 조선어; 고대 한국어	Old Korean (3rd-9th cent.)
okr			I/L			Kirike
oks			I/L			Oko-Eni-Osayen
oku			I/L			Oku
okv			I/L			Orokaiva
okx			I/L			Okpe (Northwestern Edo)
okz			I/H	Austroasiatic		Old Khmer
ola			I/L			Walungge
olb			I/L	Niger–Congo?		Oli-Bodiman
old			I/L			Mochi
ole			I/L	Sino-Tibetan? / isolate?		Olekha
olk			I/E			Olkol
olm			I/L			Oloma
olo			I/L			Livvi
olr			I/L			Olrat
olt			I/H	Indo-European	old lietuvių	Old Lithuanian
olu			I/L	Niger–Congo		Kuvale
oma			I/L			Omaha-Ponca
omb			I/L			East Ambae
omc			I/E			Mochica
(ome)			I/E	spurious language		Omejes
omg			I/L			Omagua
omi			I/L			Omi
omk			I/E			Omok
oml			I/L			Ombo
omn			I/H	unclassified		Minoan
omo			I/L			Utarmbung
omp			I/H	Sino-Tibetan	ꯃꯩꯇꯩꯂꯣꯟ	Old Manipuri
omr			I/H	Indo-European	𑘦𑘨𑘰𑘙𑘲	Old Marathi
omt			I/L			Omotik
omu			I/E			Omurano
omw			I/L			South Tairora
omx			I/H	Austroasiatic	ဘာသာမန်	Old Mon
omy			I/H	Austronesian		Old Malay
ona			I/L			Ona
onb			I/L			Lingao
one			I/L		Onʌyota’a:ka	Oneida
ong			I/L			Olo
oni			I/L			Onin
onj			I/L			Onjob
onk			I/L			Kabore One
onn			I/L			Onobasulu
ono			I/L		Onǫta’kéka’	Onondaga
onp			I/L	Sino-Tibetan	But(pa)	Sartang
onr			I/L			Northern One
ons			I/L			Ono
ont			I/L			Ontenu
onu			I/L			Unua
onw			I/H	Eastern Sudanic		Old Nubian
onx			I/L			Onin Based Pidgin
ood			I/L		O'odham	Tohono O'odham
oog			I/L	Austroasiatic		Ong
oon			I/L			Önge
oor			I/L			Oorlams
oos			I/H	Indo-European		Old Ossetic
opa			I/L			Okpamheri
(ope)			I/H			Old Persian
opk			I/L			Kopkaka
opm			I/L			Oksapmin
opo			I/L			Opao
opt			I/E			Opata
opy			I/L			Ofayé
ora			I/L			Oroha
orc			I/L			Orma
ore			I/L			Orejón
org			I/L			Oring
orh			I/L			Oroqen
ori	or	ori	M/L	Indo-European	ଓଡ଼ିଆ	Oriya (macrolanguage)
(ork)			I/L			Orokaiva
orm	om	orm	M/L	Afro-Asiatic	Oromoo	Oromo
orn			I/L			Orang Kanaq
oro			I/L			Orokolo
orr			I/L			Oruma
ors			I/L			Orang Seletar
ort			I/L			Adivasi Oriya
oru			I/L	Indo-European	اورموړی	Ormuri
orv			I/H	Indo-European		Old Russian
orw			I/L			Oro Win
orx			I/L			Oro
ory			I/L			Odia; Oriya (individual language)
orz			I/L			Ormu
osa		osa	I/L		𐓏𐓘𐓻𐓘𐓻𐓟	Osage
osc			I/H			Oscan
osd			I/L	Indo-European	дигорон ӕвзаг	Digor Ossetic; Digor; Digor Ossetian
osi			I/L			Osing
osn			I/H	Austronesian	ᮘᮞ ᮞᮥᮔ᮪ᮓ ᮘᮥᮠᮥᮔ᮪	Old Sundanese
oso			I/L			Ososo
osp			I/H	Indo-European	romançe	Old Spanish
oss	os	oss	I/L	Indo-European	Ирон ӕвзаг	Iron Ossetic; Iron; Iron Ossetian; Ossetian; Ossetic
ost			I/L			Osatu
osu			I/L			Southern One
osx			I/H	Indo-European	Sahsisk	Old Saxon
ota		ota	I/H		لسان عثمانى	Ottoman Turkish (1500-1928)
otb			I/H	Sino-Tibetan		Old Tibetan
otd			I/L			Ot Danum
ote			I/L			Mezquital Otomi
oti			I/E			Oti
otk			I/H	Turkic		Old Turkish
otl			I/L			Tilapa Otomi
otm			I/L			Eastern Highland Otomi
otn			I/L			Tenango Otomi
otq			I/L			Querétaro Otomi
otr			I/L			Otoro
ots			I/L			Estado de México Otomi
ott			I/L			Temoaya Otomi
otu			I/E			Otuke
otw			I/L		Nishnaabemwin (Daawaamwin)	Ottawa
otx			I/L			Texcatepec Otomi
oty			I/H	Dravidian		Old Tamil
otz			I/L			Ixtenco Otomi
oua			I/L			Tagargrent
oub			I/L			Glio-Oubi
oue			I/L			Oune
oui			I/H	Turkic		Old Uighur
oum			I/E			Ouma
(oun)			I/L			ǃOǃung
ovd			I/L	Indo-European		Elfdalian; Övdalian
owi			I/L			Owiniga
owl			I/H	Indo-European	Hen Gymraeg	Old Welsh
oyb			I/L	Austroasiatic	The	Oy
oyd			I/L			Oyda
oym			I/L			Wayampi
oyy			I/L			Oya'oya
ozm			I/L			Koonzime

== Sources ==
- "ISO 639-2 Registration Authority". Library of Congress.
- "ISO 639-3 Registration Authority". SIL International.
- Lewis, M. Paul; Simons, Gary F.; Fennig, Charles D., eds. (2016). "Ethnologue: Languages of the World" (19th ed.). Dallas, Texas: SIL International.
