= Southwestern Edoid languages =

Nigerian languages

According to the language family tree classification by Ethnologue, Okpe, Urhobo and Uvwie, alongside Eruwa and Isoko, make up the five Southwestern Edoid languages of the Benue-Congo group. Quoting Johnstone (1993), Ethnologue puts the population of Urhobo people at 546,000, Okpe 25,400 (2000) and Uvwie 19,800 (2000). These three languages have geographically neighbouring languages: Izon and Itsekiri to the west and south, Ukwuani and Isoko to the east, and Edo to the north. Thus, Isoko and Urhobo are similar languages that belong to the same linguistic family.

== Isoko Literature ==
There is literature for both the Urhobo and Isoko languages. There are Bibles and Christian hymn books for both languages. There are also dictionaries for Urhobo, written by Ukere, Osubele, Juliua Arerierian and Akpobome Diffre-Odiete. While all the former ones are bilingual, the last one by Diffre-Odiete is a multilingual dictionary of English, Okpe, Urhobo and Uvwie, with over 900 entries in the four languages.

== Dialects ==
Okpe (ISO 639 – 3:oke), Urhobo (ISO 639 – 3:urh) and Uvwie (ISO 639 – 3:evh) are three diverse languages spoken in an area belonging to one and the same ethnic group called the Urhobo people of Delta State in southern Nigeria, Africa. The Urhobo ethnic nation is culturally united, but it comprises twenty-four political clans or kingdoms. Okpe is spoken in only one kingdom (the largest in Urhoboland). Uvwie is spoken in two kingdoms, while Urhobo is spoken, with dialectical varieties, in the remaining twenty-one kingdoms. The Agbarho dialect is the accepted standard of written Urhobo for all twenty-four kingdoms. The Okpe and Uvwie clans view their languages as distinct languages and not as dialects of Urhobo. However, in their communication with people of other Urhobo clans, they use Urhobo, English or Nigerian Pidgin.

== Language Endangerment ==
Okpe and Uvwie speakers have been protesting the dominance of Urhobo-speaking clans over them. As such, they have gone beyond linguistic self-preservation to seeking politico-cultural alienation from other Urhobo clans. Therefore, people of the other twenty-one Urhobo-speaking clans view these activities as a threat to the historical and cultural unity of the ethnic nation.

Previous research shows that the three languages of the Urhobo people are endangered to various degrees. Urhobo is only seriously endangered by the impact of Nigerian Pidgin and English in communication. Macaulay Mowarin (2005) notes that Uvwie is the most endangered of the trio, facing serious impact in the urban and rural areas from Nigerian Pidgin, Urhobo and English. Okpe is seriously endangered in Sapele, the major Okpe town because of the impact of Nigerian Pidgin, Itsekiri, and Urhobo. In the rural areas, Okpe is endangered too, mainly from Itsekiri and Urhobo impact.

There are several factors responsible for the gradual loss of the three languages. The contact between the three languages on the one hand, and with other neighbouring languages on the other, have greatly impacted the trio, especially Uvwie. Generally, the language of communication is English among literate people and Nigerian Pidgin among illiterates and semi-literates of Urhobo and neighbouring communities. This is the case in all spheres of activities, except in annual or periodical traditional religious rites or elders' and chiefs' meetings, especially in rural areas. Okpe, Urhobo and Uvwie are also spoken in some rural homes, markets and Orthodox Church services.

Moreover, the non-implementation of the National Policy on Education continues to cause negative effect on language acquisition by newer generations of the Urhobo people. The policy which states that the language of instruction for the first three years of education should be the pupils' mother tongue or language of the school's host community has been largely ignored. Fines and other punishments are usually imposed on pupils and students who speak their native languages during school hours in both public and private schools across Delta State. This is to encourage the use of English as a lingua franca. English is made a core subject in order to graduate from secondary school and to gain admission to higher institutions.

Intermarriages between native speakers and people of other language communities also affect intergenerational transfer of the languages, and thus children are raised with English. The impact of English on these native languages has spread to rural areas, especially among the youth and children who communicate in Pidgin and English because of the negative psychological effect of being regarded as primitive if they speak their native language in public. Finally, the adoption of Agbarho dialect as the only acceptable form of written Urhobo has led to the non-documentation of Okpe and Uvwie languages as well as other dialects of Urhobo.
