= ISO 639:w =

List of ISO 639-3 language codes starting with W

This is a list of ISO 639-3 language codes starting with W.

Index | a | b | c | d | e | f | g | h | i | j | k | l | m | n | o | p | q | r | s | t | u | v | w | x | y | z

Abbreviations are used in the table as follows:

- Scope: I = individual language, M = macrolanguage, S = special code
- Type: C = constructed, E = extinct (in recent times), H = historical (distinct from its modern form), L = living, S = special code

Deprecated codes are enclosed in (parentheses).

The column Family contains the generic English name of the language's family or macrolanguage.

ISO 639 codes			Scope/Type	Family	Language names	
639-3	639-1	639-2/B	Scope/Type	Family	Native	ISO name
waa			I/L			Walla Walla
wab			I/L			Wab
wac			I/E			Wasco-Wishram
wad			I/L			Wamesa; Wondama
wae			I/L			Walser
waf			I/E			Wakoná
wag			I/L			Wa'ema
wah			I/L			Watubela
wai			I/L			Wares
waj			I/L			Waffa
wal		wal	I/L	Afro-Asiatic	Wolayttatto Doonaa	Wolaytta; Wolaitta
wam			I/E			Wampanoag
wan			I/L			Wan
wao			I/E			Wappo
wap			I/L			Wapishana
waq			I/L			Wagiman
war		war	I/L		Winaray	Waray (Philippines)
was		was	I/L			Washo
wat			I/L			Kaninuwa
wau			I/L			Waurá
wav			I/L			Waka
waw			I/L			Waiwai
wax			I/L			Marangis; Watam
way			I/L			Wayana
waz			I/L			Wampur
wba			I/L	language isolate / Waroid		Warao
wbb			I/L			Wabo
wbe			I/L			Waritai
wbf			I/L			Wara
wbh			I/L			Wanda
wbi			I/L			Vwanji
wbj			I/L			Alagwa
wbk			I/L			Waigali
wbl			I/L			Wakhi
wbm			I/L			Wa
wbp			I/L			Warlpiri
wbq			I/L			Waddar
wbr			I/L			Wagdi
wbs			I/L			West Bengal Sign Language
wbt			I/L			Warnman
wbv			I/L			Wajarri
wbw			I/L			Woi
wca			I/L			Yanomámi
wci			I/L			Waci Gbe
wdd			I/L			Wandji
wdg			I/L			Wadaginam
wdj			I/L			Wadjiginy
wdk			I/E			Wadikali
wdt			I/L	Iroquoian		Wendat
wdu			I/E			Wadjigu
wdy			I/E			Wadjabangayi
wea			I/E	Sino-Tibetan		Wewaw
wec			I/L			Wè Western
wed			I/L			Wedau
weg			I/L			Wergaia
weh			I/L			Weh
wei			I/L			Kiunum
wem			I/L			Weme Gbe
weo			I/L			Wemale
wep			I/L	Indo-European	Westfäölsk	Westphalien
wer			I/L			Weri
wes			I/L			Cameroon Pidgin
wet			I/L			Perai
weu			I/L			Rawngtu Chin
wew			I/L			Wejewa
wfg			I/L			Yafi; Zorop
wga			I/E			Wagaya
wgb			I/L			Wagawaga
wgg			I/E			Wangganguru; Wangkangurru
wgi			I/L			Wahgi
wgo			I/L			Waigeo
wgu			I/E	Pama–Nyungan		Wirangu
(wgw)			I/L			Wagawaga
wgy			I/L			Warrgamay
wha			I/L			Manusela; Sou Upaa
whg			I/L			North Wahgi
whk			I/L			Wahau Kenyah
whu			I/L			Wahau Kayan
wib			I/L			Southern Toussian
wic			I/E			Wichita
wie			I/E			Wik-Epa
wif			I/E			Wik-Keyangan
wig			I/L			Wik Ngathan
wih			I/L			Wik-Me'anha
wii			I/L			Minidien
wij			I/L			Wik-Iiyanh
wik			I/L			Wikalkan
wil			I/E			Wilawila
wim			I/L			Wik-Mungkan
win			I/L			Ho-Chunk
wir			I/E			Wiraféd
(wit)			I/L			Wintu
wiu			I/L			Wiru
wiv			I/L			Vitu
(wiw)			I/L	spurious language		Wirangu
wiy			I/E		Wiyot	Wiyot
wja			I/L			Waja
wji			I/L			Warji
wka			I/E			Kw'adza
wkb			I/L	Dravidian		Kumbaran
wkd			I/L			Mo; Wakde
wkl			I/L	Dravidian		Kalanadi
wkr			I/L	Pama–Nyungan		Keerray-Woorroong
wku			I/L	Dravidian		Kunduvadi
wkw			I/E			Wakawaka
wky			I/E			Wangkayutyuru
wla			I/L			Walio
wlc			I/L			Mwali Comorian
wle			I/L			Wolane
wlg			I/L			Kunbarlang
wlh			I/L			Welaun
wli			I/L			Waioli
wlk			I/E			Wailaki
wll			I/L			Wali (Sudan)
wlm			I/H			Middle Welsh
wln	wa	wln	I/L	Indo-European	walon	Walloon
wlo			I/L			Wolio
wlr			I/L			Wailapa
wls			I/L			Wallisian
wlu			I/E			Wuliwuli
wlv			I/L			Wichí Lhamtés Vejoz
wlw			I/L			Walak
wlx			I/L			Wali (Ghana)
wly			I/E	Sino-Tibetan		Waling
wma			I/E	spurious language		Mawa (Nigeria)
wmb			I/L			Wambaya
wmc			I/L			Wamas
wmd			I/L			Mamaindé
wme			I/L			Wambule
wmg			I/L	Sino-Tibetan		Western Minyag
wmh			I/L			Waima'a
wmi			I/E			Wamin
wmm			I/L			Maiwa (Indonesia)
wmn			I/E			Waamwang
wmo			I/L			Wom (Papua New Guinea)
wms			I/L			Wambon
wmt			I/L			Walmajarri
wmw			I/L			Mwani
wmx			I/L			Womo
wnb			I/L	Madang	Wanambre	Mokati
wnc			I/L			Wantoat
wnd			I/E			Wandarang
wne			I/L			Waneci
wng			I/L			Wanggom
wni			I/L			Ndzwani Comorian
wnk			I/L			Wanukaka
wnm			I/E			Wanggamala
wnn			I/E			Wunumara
wno			I/L			Wano
wnp			I/L			Wanap
wnu			I/L			Usan
wnw			I/L			Wintu
wny			I/L			Waanyi; Wanyi
woa			I/L			Kuwema; Tyaraity
wob			I/L			Wè Northern
woc			I/L			Wogeo
wod			I/L			Wolani
woe			I/L			Woleaian
wof			I/L			Gambian Wolof
wog			I/L			Wogamusin
woi			I/L			Kamang
wok			I/L			Longto
wol	wo	wol	I/L	Niger–Congo	Wolof	Wolof
wom			I/L			Wom (Nigeria)
won			I/L			Wongo
woo			I/L			Manombai
wor			I/L			Woria
wos			I/L			Hanga Hundi
wow			I/L			Wawonii
woy			I/E	unclassified / Agaw?		Weyto
wpc			I/L			Maco
(wra)			I/L			Warapu
wrb			I/E			Waluwarra; Warluwara
(wrd)			I/L	spurious language		Warduji
(wre)			I/L	spurious language		Ware
wrg			I/E			Gudjal; Warungu
wrh			I/E			Wiradjuri
wri			I/E			Wariyangga
wrk			I/L			Garrwa
wrl			I/L			Warlmanpa
wrm			I/L			Warumungu
wrn			I/L			Warnang
wro			I/E			Worrorra
wrp			I/L			Waropen
wrr			I/L			Wardaman
wrs			I/L			Waris
wru			I/L			Waru
wrv			I/L			Waruna
wrw			I/E			Gugu Warra
wrx			I/L			Wae Rana
wry			I/L			Merwari
wrz			I/E			Waray (Australia)
wsa			I/L			Warembori
wsg			I/L	Dravidian		Adilabad Gondi
wsi			I/L			Wusi
wsk			I/L			Waskia
wsr			I/L			Owenia
wss			I/L			Wasa
wsu			I/E			Wasu
wsv			I/E			Wotapuri-Katarqalai
wtb			I/L	Niger–Congo		Matambwe
wtf			I/L			Watiwa
wth			I/E			Wathawurrung
wti			I/L			Berta
wtk			I/L			Watakataui
wtm			I/L			Mewati
wtw			I/L			Wotu
wua			I/L			Wikngenchera
wub			I/L			Wunambal
wud			I/L			Wudu
wuh			I/L			Wutunhua
wul			I/L			Silimo
wum			I/L			Wumbvu
wun			I/L			Bungu
wur			I/E			Wurrugu
wut			I/L			Wutung
wuu			I/L	Sino-Tibetan	吴语/吳語	Wu Chinese
wuv			I/L			Wuvulu-Aua
wux			I/L			Wulna
wuy			I/L			Wauyai
wwa			I/L			Waama
wwb			I/E			Wakabunga
wwo			I/L			Dorig; Wetamut
wwr			I/E			Warrwa
www			I/L			Wawa
wxa			I/L			Waxianghua
wxw			I/E			Wardandi
(wya)			I/L			Wyandot
wyb			I/L			Wangaaybuwan-Ngiyambaa
wyi			I/E			Woiwurrung
wym			I/L		Wymysiöeryś	Wymysorys
wyn			I/L	Iroquoian		Wyandot
wyr			I/L			Wayoró
wyy			I/L			Western Fijian

== Sources ==
- "ISO 639-2 Registration Authority". Library of Congress.
- "ISO 639-3 Registration Authority". SIL International.
- Lewis, M. Paul; Simons, Gary F.; Fennig, Charles D., eds. (2016). "Ethnologue: Languages of the World" (19th ed.). Dallas, Texas: SIL International.
