= ISO 639:x =

List of ISO 639-3 language codes starting with X

This is a list of ISO 639-3 language codes starting with X.

Index | a | b | c | d | e | f | g | h | i | j | k | l | m | n | o | p | q | r | s | t | u | v | w | x | y | z

Abbreviations are used in the table as follows:

- Scope: I = individual language, M = macrolanguage, S = special code
- Type: C = constructed, E = extinct (in recent times), H = historical (distinct from its modern form), L = living, S = special code

Deprecated codes are enclosed in (parentheses).

The column Family contains the generic English name of the language's family or macrolanguage.

ISO 639 codes			Scope/Type	Family	Language names	
639-3	639-1	639-2/B	Scope/Type	Family	Native	ISO name
xaa			I/H	Afro-Asiatic	العربية الأندلسية	Andalusian Arabic
xab			I/L			Sambe
xac			I/L			Kachari
xad			I/E			Adai
xae			I/H			Aequian
xag			I/H			Aghwan
(xah)			I/L			Kahayan
xai			I/E			Kaimbé
xaj			I/E	Tupian		Ararandewára
xak			I/E	isolate		Máku
xal		xal	I/L		хальмг	Kalmyk; Oirat
xam			I/E	Tuu	ǀKham	ǀXam
xan			I/L			Xamtanga
xao			I/L			Khao
xap			I/E			Apalachee
xaq			I/H			Aquitanian
xar			I/E	unclassified		Karami
xas			I/E			Kamas
xat			I/L			Katawixi
xau			I/L			Kauwera
xav			I/L			Xavánte
xaw			I/L			Kawaiisu
xay			I/L			Kayan Mahakam
(xba)			I/E			Kamba (Brazil)
xbb			I/E			Lower Burdekin
xbc			I/H			Bactrian
xbd			I/E			Bindal
xbe			I/E			Bigambal
xbg			I/E			Bunganditj
xbi			I/L			Kombio
xbj			I/E			Birrpayi
xbm			I/H			Middle Breton
xbn			I/E	unclassified / isolate / Austroasiatic?		Kenaboi
xbo			I/H			Bolgarian
xbp			I/E			Bibbulman
xbr			I/L			Kambera
xbw			I/E			Kambiwá
(xbx)			I/E	spurious		Kabixí
xby			I/L			Batjala; Batyala
xcb			I/H			Cumbric
xcc			I/H			Camunic
xce			I/H			Celtiberian
xcg			I/H			Cisalpine Gaulish
xch			I/E	Chimakuan	Aqoʞúlo	Chemakum; Chimakum
xcl			I/H			Classical Armenian
xcm			I/E			Comecrudo
xcn			I/E			Cotoname
xco			I/H			Chorasmian
xcr			I/H			Carian
xct			I/H	Sino-Tibetan		Classical Tibetan
xcu			I/H			Curonian
xcv			I/E			Chuvantsy
xcw			I/E			Coahuilteco
xcy			I/E			Cayuse
xda			I/L			Darkinyung
xdc			I/H			Dacian
xdk			I/E			Dharuk
xdm			I/H			Edomite
xdo			I/L	Niger–Congo		Kwandu
xdq			I/L	Northeast Caucasian	хайдакьан кув	Kaitag
xdy			I/L			Malayic Dayak
xeb			I/H			Eblan
xed			I/L			Hdi
xeg			I/E			ǁXegwi
xel			I/L			Kelo
xem			I/L			Kembayan
xep			I/H			Epi-Olmec
xer			I/L			Xerénte
xes			I/L			Kesawai
xet			I/L			Xetá
xeu			I/L	Trans–New Guinea	Lower Ahia - Kouri	Keoru-Ahia
xfa			I/H			Faliscan
xga			I/H			Galatian
xgb			I/E			Gbin
xgd			I/E			Gudang
xgf			I/E			Gabrielino-Fernandeño
xgg			I/E			Goreng
xgi			I/E			Garingbal
xgl			I/H			Galindan
xgm			I/E			Dharumbal; Guwinmal
xgr			I/E			Garza
xgu			I/L			Unggumi
xgw			I/E			Guwa
xha			I/H			Harami
xhc			I/H	unclassified		Hunnic
xhd			I/H			Hadrami
xhe			I/L			Khetrani
xhm			I/H	Austroasiatic		Middle Khmer (1400 to 1850 CE)
xho	xh	xho	I/L	Niger–Congo	isiXhosa	Xhosa
xhr			I/H			Hernican
xht			I/H	unclassified		Hattic
xhu			I/H			Hurrian
xhv			I/L			Khua
(xia)			I/L			Xiandao
xib			I/H	unclassified		Iberian
xii			I/L			Xiri
xil			I/H			Illyrian
xin			I/E			Xinca
(xip)			I/E	spurious		Xipináwa
xir			I/E			Xiriâna
xis			I/L	Indo-European		Kisan
xiv			I/H	unclassified		Indus Valley Language
xiw			I/L			Shiwa
xiy			I/L			Xipaya
xjb			I/E			Minjungbal
xjt			I/E			Jaitmatang
xka			I/L			Kalkoti
xkb			I/L			Northern Nago
xkc			I/L			Kho'ini
xkd			I/L			Mendalam Kayan
xke			I/L	Austronesian	Kereho	Kereho
xkf			I/L			Khengkha
xkg			I/L			Kagoro
(xkh)			I/L			Karahawyana
xki			I/L			Kenyan Sign Language
xkj			I/L			Kajali
xkk			I/L	Austroasiatic		Kachok; Kaco'
xkl			I/L	Austronesian	Bakung	Mainstream Kenyah
(xkm)			I/L	spurious		Mahakam Kenyah
xkn			I/L			Kayan River Kayan
xko			I/L			Kiorr
xkp			I/L			Kabatei
xkq			I/L			Koroni
xkr			I/E			Xakriabá
xks			I/L			Kumbewaha
xkt			I/L			Kantosi
xku			I/L			Kaamba
xkv			I/L			Kgalagadi
xkw			I/L			Kembra
xkx			I/L			Karore
xky			I/L	Austronesian		Uma' Lasan
xkz			I/L			Kurtokha
xla			I/L			Kamula
xlb			I/E			Loup B
xlc			I/H			Lycian
xld			I/H			Lydian
xle			I/H			Lemnian
xlg			I/H	unclassified, maybe Indo-European / (para-)Celtic		Ligurian (Ancient)
xli			I/H			Liburnian
xln			I/H			Alanic
xlo			I/E			Loup A
xlp			I/H			Lepontic
xls			I/H			Lusitanian
xlu			I/H	Indo-European		Cuneiform Luwian
xly			I/H	Indo-European		Elymian
xma			I/L			Mushungulu
xmb			I/L			Mbonga
xmc			I/L			Makhuwa-Marrevone
xmd			I/L			Mbudum
xme			I/H			Median
xmf			I/L		მარგალური	Mingrelian
xmg			I/L			Mengaka
xmh			I/L	Pama–Nyungan		Kugu-Muminh
(xmi)			I/L	spurious		Miarrã
xmj			I/L			Majera
xmk			I/H			Ancient Macedonian
xml			I/L			Malaysian Sign Language
xmm			I/L			Manado Malay
xmn			I/H	Indo-European	𐫛𐫀𐫡𐫘𐫏𐫐	Manichaean Middle Persian
xmo			I/L			Morerebi
xmp			I/E			Kuku-Mu'inh
xmq			I/E			Kuku-Mangk
xmr			I/H	unclassified, maybe Nilo-Saharan / Afroasiatic		Meroitic
xms			I/L			Moroccan Sign Language
xmt			I/L			Matbat
xmu			I/E			Kamu
xmv			I/L			Antankarana Malagasy; Tankarana Malagasy
xmw			I/L			Tsimihety Malagasy
xmx			I/L			Salawati; Maden
xmy			I/L			Mayaguduna
xmz			I/L			Mori Bawah
xna			I/H			Ancient North Arabian
xnb			I/L			Kanakanabu
xng			I/H			Middle Mongolian
xnh			I/L	Austroasiatic		Kuanhua
xni			I/E			Ngarigu
xnj			I/L	Niger–Congo		Ngoni (Tanzania)
xnk			I/E			Nganakarti
xnm			I/E			Ngumbarl
xnn			I/L			Northern Kankanay
xno			I/H			Anglo-Norman
xnq			I/L	Niger–Congo		Ngoni (Mozambique)
xnr			I/L			Kangri
xns			I/L			Kanashi
xnt			I/E			Narragansett
xnu			I/E			Nukunul
xny			I/L			Nyiyaparli
xnz			I/L			Kenzi; Mattoki
xoc			I/E	Niger–Congo?	Oʼchiʼchiʼ	O'chi'chi'
xod			I/L			Kokoda
xog			I/L			Soga
xoi			I/L			Kominimung
xok			I/L			Xokleng
xom			I/L			Komo (Sudan)
xon			I/L			Konkomba
xoo			I/E			Xukurú
xop			I/L			Kopar
xor			I/L			Korubo
xow			I/L			Kowaki
xpa			I/E			Pirriya
xpb			I/E			Northeastern Tasmanian; Pyemmairrener
xpc			I/H			Pecheneg
xpd			I/E			Oyster Bay Tasmanian
xpe			I/L			Liberia Kpelle
xpf			I/E			Nuenonne; Southeast Tasmanian
xpg			I/H			Phrygian
xph			I/E			North Midlands Tasmanian; Tyerrenoterpanner
xpi			I/H			Pictish
xpj			I/E			Mpalitjanh
xpk			I/L	Panoan	Kulina Pano	Kulina Pano
xpl			I/E			Port Sorell Tasmanian
xpm			I/E			Pumpokol
xpn			I/E			Kapinawá
xpo			I/E			Pochutec
xpp			I/H			Puyo-Paekche
xpq			I/E			Mohegan-Pequot
xpr			I/H			Parthian
xps			I/H			Pisidian
xpt			I/E			Punthamara
xpu			I/H			Punic
xpv			I/E			Northern Tasmanian; Tommeginne
xpw			I/E			Northwestern Tasmanian; Peerapper
xpx			I/E			Southwestern Tasmanian; Toogee
xpy			I/H			Puyo
xpz			I/E			Bruny Island Tasmanian
xqa			I/H	Turkic	Türki	Karakhanid
xqt			I/H			Qatabanian
xra			I/L			Krahô
xrb			I/L			Eastern Karaboro
xrd			I/E			Gundungurra
xre			I/L			Kreye
xrg			I/E			Minang
xri			I/L			Krikati-Timbira
xrm			I/H			Armazic
xrn			I/E			Arin
(xrq)			I/E			Karranga
xrr			I/H			Raetic
xrt			I/E			Aranama-Tamique
xru			I/L	Western Daly	Berringen	Marriammu
xrw			I/L			Karawa
xsa			I/H			Sabaean
xsb			I/L			Sambal
xsc			I/H			Scythian
xsd			I/H			Sidetic
xse			I/L			Sempan
xsh			I/L			Shamang
xsi			I/L			Sio
xsj			I/L	Niger–Congo?		Subi
(xsk)			I/H			Sakan
xsl			I/L		ᑌᓀᒐ	South Slavey
xsm			I/L			Kasem
xsn			I/L			Sanga (Nigeria)
xso			I/E	unclassified / isolate?		Solano
xsp			I/L			Silopi
xsq			I/L			Makhuwa-Saka
xsr			I/L			Sherpa
(xss)			I/E			Assan
(xst)			I/L			Silt'e
xsu			I/L	Yanomaman	Sanöma	Sanumá
xsv			I/E		Sūdaviskai	Sudovian
xsy			I/L			Saisiyat
xta			I/L			Alcozauca Mixtec
xtb			I/L			Chazumba Mixtec
xtc			I/L			Katcha-Kadugli-Miri
xtd			I/L			Diuxi-Tilantongo Mixtec
xte			I/L			Ketengban
xtg			I/H			Transalpine Gaulish
xth			I/E			Yitha Yitha
xti			I/L			Sinicahua Mixtec
xtj			I/L			San Juan Teita Mixtec
xtl			I/L			Tijaltepec Mixtec
xtm			I/L			Magdalena Peñasco Mixtec
xtn			I/L			Northern Tlaxiaco Mixtec
xto			I/H			Tokharian A
xtp			I/L			San Miguel Piedras Mixtec
xtq			I/H	Indo-European		Tumshuqese
xtr			I/H	Sino-Tibetan		Early Tripuri
xts			I/L			Sindihui Mixtec
xtt			I/L			Tacahua Mixtec
xtu			I/L			Cuyamecalco Mixtec
xtv			I/E			Thawa
xtw			I/L			Tawandê
xty			I/L			Yoloxochitl Mixtec
(xtz)			I/E			Tasmanian
xua			I/L			Alu Kurumba
xub			I/L			Betta Kurumba
xud			I/E			Umiida
(xuf)			I/L			Kunfal
xug			I/L			Kunigami
xuj			I/L			Jennu Kurumba
xul			I/E			Ngunawal; Nunukul
xum			I/H			Umbrian
xun			I/E			Unggaranggu
xuo			I/L			Kuo
xup			I/E			Upper Umpqua
xur			I/H			Urartian
xut			I/E			Kuthant
xuu			I/L			Khwedam; Kxoe
xve			I/H			Venetic
xvi			I/L			Kamviri
xvn			I/H			Vandalic
xvo			I/H			Volscian
xvs			I/H			Vestinian
xwa			I/L	unclassified, likely isolate	Tsẽtsitswa	Kwaza
xwc			I/E			Woccon
xwd			I/E			Wadi Wadi
xwe			I/L			Xwela Gbe
xwg			I/L			Kwegu
xwj			I/E			Wajuk
xwk			I/E			Wangkumara
xwl			I/L			Western Xwla Gbe
xwo			I/E			Written Oirat
xwr			I/L			Kwerba Mamberamo
xwt			I/E			Wotjobaluk
xww			I/E			Wemba Wemba
xxb			I/E			Boro (Ghana)
xxk			I/L			Ke'o
xxm			I/E			Minkin
xxr			I/E			Koropó
xxt			I/E	unclassified, maybe isolate		Tambora
xya			I/E			Yaygir
xyb			I/E			Yandjibara
xyj			I/E			Mayi-Yapi
xyk			I/E			Mayi-Kulan
xyl			I/E			Yalakalore
xyt			I/E			Mayi-Thakurti
xyy			I/L			Yorta Yorta
xzh			I/H			Zhang-Zhung
xzm			I/E			Zemgalian
xzp			I/H			Ancient Zapotec

== Sources ==
- "ISO 639-2 Registration Authority". Library of Congress.
- "ISO 639-3 Registration Authority". SIL International.
- Lewis, M. Paul; Simons, Gary F.; Fennig, Charles D., eds. (2016). "Ethnologue: Languages of the World" (19th ed.). Dallas, Texas: SIL International.
