= Okpako =

- Languages: Isoko, Urhobo

Origin
- Language: Delta State
- Origin: Nigeria
- Meaning: Elder/Senior

listen

Okpako which translates to Elder in the Isoko - Urhobo language, represent wisdom and leadership in age. The name is mostly given to male gender.

Notable people with the name include:

- Solomon Okpako, footballer
