= Oghenekaro =

- Gender: Unisex
- Languages: Isoko, Urhobo

Origin
- Language: Delta State
- Meaning: God first
- Region of origin: Southern Nigeria

Other names
- Nickname: Karo

listen

Oghenekaro is a unisex name in the Urhobo-Isoko language meaning "God first".

Notable people with the name include:

- Peter Etebo, Nigerian footballer
- Oghenekaro Itene, Nigerian actress
