= Onome =

- Pronunciation: /ɔːnɔːmɛ/
- Gender: Unisex
- Languages: Urhobo, Isoko

Origin
- Language: Delta State
- Meaning: My own

listen

Onome is a Nigerian name of Urhobo descent meaning "my own". It may refer to:

- Glory Onome Nathaniel (born 1996), Nigerian athlete
- Onome Akinbode-James (born 2000), Nigerian basketball player
- Onome Ebi (born 1983), Nigerian footballer
- Onome Ojo (born 1977), American football player
- Onome Sodje (born 1988), Nigerian footballer
- Yung6ix (Onome Onokohwomo; born 1989), Nigerian hip hop artist
