= ISO 639:y =

List of ISO 639-3 language codes starting with Y

This is a list of ISO 639-3 language codes starting with Y.

Index | a | b | c | d | e | f | g | h | i | j | k | l | m | n | o | p | q | r | s | t | u | v | w | x | y | z

Abbreviations are used in the table as follows:

- Scope: I = individual language, M = macrolanguage, S = special code
- Type: C = constructed, E = extinct (in recent times), H = historical (distinct from its modern form), L = living, S = special code

Deprecated codes are enclosed in (parentheses).

The column Family contains the generic English name of the language's family or macrolanguage.

| ISO 639 codes | | | Scope/Type | Family | Language names | |
| 639-3 | 639-1 | 639-2/B | Scope/Type | Family | Native | ISO name |
|---|---|---|---|---|---|---|
| yaa | | | I/L | | | Yaminahua |
| yab | | | I/L | | | Yuhup |
| yac | | | I/L | | | Pass Valley Yali |
| yad | | | I/L | | | Yagua |
| yae | | | I/L | | | Pumé |
| yaf | | | I/L | | | Yaka (Democratic Republic of Congo) |
| yag | | | I/L | | | Yámana |
| yah | | | I/L | | | Yazgulyam |
| yai | | | I/L | | | Yagnobi |
| yaj | | | I/L | | | Banda-Yangere |
| yak | | | I/L | | | Yakama |
| yal | | | I/L | | | Yalunka |
| yam | | | I/L | | | Yamba |
| yan | | | I/L | | | Mayangna |
| yao | | yao | I/L | | | Yao |
| yap | | yap | I/L | | | Yapese |
| yaq | | | I/L | | | Yaqui |
| yar | | | I/L | | | Yabarana |
| yas | | | I/L | | | Nugunu (Cameroon) |
| yat | | | I/L | | | Yambeta |
| yau | | | I/L | | | Yuwana |
| yav | | | I/L | | | Yangben |
| yaw | | | I/L | | | Yawalapití |
| yax | | | I/L | | | Yauma |
| yay | | | I/L | | | Agwagwune |
| yaz | | | I/L | | | Lokaa |
| yba | | | I/L | | | Yala |
| ybb | | | I/L | | | Yemba |
| (ybd) | | | I/L | | | Yangbye |
| ybe | | | I/L | | | West Yugur |
| ybh | | | I/L | Sino-Tibetan | याक्खा | Yakha |
| ybi | | | I/L | Sino-Tibetan | | Yamphu |
| ybj | | | I/L | | | Hasha |
| ybk | | | I/L | | | Bokha |
| ybl | | | I/L | | | Yukuben |
| ybm | | | I/L | | | Yaben |
| ybn | | | I/E | | | Yabaâna |
| ybo | | | I/L | | | Yabong |
| ybx | | | I/L | | | Yawiyo |
| yby | | | I/L | | | Yaweyuha |
| ych | | | I/L | | | Chesu |
| ycl | | | I/L | | | Lolopo |
| ycn | | | I/L | | | Yucuna |
| ycp | | | I/L | | | Chepya |
| ycr | | | I/L | | | Yilan Creole |
| yda | | | I/E | | | Yanda |
| ydd | | | I/L | | | Eastern Yiddish |
| yde | | | I/L | Torricelli | Aiku | Yangum Dey |
| ydg | | | I/L | | | Yidgha |
| ydk | | | I/L | | | Yoidik |
| (yds) | | | I/L | spurious language | | Yiddish Sign Language |
| yea | | | I/L | | | Ravula |
| yec | | | I/L | | | Yeniche |
| yee | | | I/L | | | Yimas |
| yei | | | I/E | | | Yeni |
| yej | | | I/L | | | Yevanic |
| yel | | | I/L | | | Yela |
| (yen) | | | I/L | | | Yendang |
| yer | | | I/L | | | Tarok |
| yes | | | I/L | | | Nyankpa |
| yet | | | I/L | | | Yetfa |
| yeu | | | I/L | | | Yerukula |
| yev | | | I/L | | | Yapunda |
| yey | | | I/L | | | Yeyi |
| yga | | | I/E | | | Malyangapa |
| ygi | | | I/E | | | Yiningayi |
| ygl | | | I/L | Torricelli | | Yangum Gel |
| ygm | | | I/L | | | Yagomi |
| ygp | | | I/L | | | Gepo |
| ygr | | | I/L | | | Yagaria |
| ygs | | | I/L | | | Yolŋu Sign Language |
| ygu | | | I/L | | | Yugul |
| ygw | | | I/L | | | Yagwoia |
| yha | | | I/L | | | Baha Buyang |
| yhd | | | I/L | Arabic | | Judeo-Iraqi Arabic |
| yhl | | | I/L | | | Hlepho Phowa |
| yhs | | | I/L | | | Yan-nhaŋu Sign Language |
| yia | | | I/L | | | Yinggarda |
| (yib) | | | I/L | | | Yinglish |
| yid | yi | yid | M/L | Indo-European | אידיש | Yiddish |
| yif | | | I/L | | | Ache |
| yig | | | I/L | | | Wusa Nasu |
| yih | | | I/E | | | Western Yiddish |
| yii | | | I/L | | | Yidiny |
| yij | | | I/L | | | Yindjibarndi |
| yik | | | I/L | | | Dongshanba Lalo |
| yil | | | I/E | | | Yindjilandji |
| yim | | | I/L | | | Yimchungru Naga |
| yin | | | I/L | | | Riang Lai; Yinchia |
| (yio) | | | I/L | | | Dayao Yi |
| yip | | | I/L | | | Pholo |
| yiq | | | I/L | | | Miqie |
| yir | | | I/L | | | North Awyu |
| yis | | | I/L | | | Yis |
| yit | | | I/L | | | Eastern Lalu |
| yiu | | | I/L | | | Awu |
| yiv | | | I/L | | | Northern Nisu |
| yix | | | I/L | | | Axi Yi |
| (yiy) | | | I/L | | | Yir Yoront |
| yiz | | | I/L | | | Azhe |
| yka | | | I/L | | | Yakan |
| ykg | | | I/L | | | Northern Yukaghir |
| ykh | | | I/L | Mongolic | | Khamnigan Mongol |
| yki | | | I/L | | | Yoke |
| ykk | | | I/L | | | Yakaikeke |
| ykl | | | I/L | | | Khlula |
| ykm | | | I/L | | | Kap |
| ykn | | | I/L | | | Kua-nsi |
| yko | | | I/L | Niger–Congo? | Iyasa | Iyasa |
| ykr | | | I/L | | | Yekora |
| ykt | | | I/L | | | Kathu |
| yku | | | I/L | | | Kuamasi |
| yky | | | I/L | | | Yakoma |
| yla | | | I/L | | | Yaul |
| ylb | | | I/L | | | Yaleba |
| yle | | | I/L | | | Yele |
| ylg | | | I/L | | | Yelogu |
| yli | | | I/L | | | Angguruk Yali |
| yll | | | I/L | | | Yil |
| ylm | | | I/L | | | Limi |
| yln | | | I/L | | | Langnian Buyang |
| ylo | | | I/L | | | Naluo Yi |
| ylr | | | I/E | | | Yalarnnga |
| ylu | | | I/L | | | Aribwaung |
| yly | | | I/L | | | Nyâlayu; Nyelâyu |
| (yma) | | | I/L | | | Yamphe |
| ymb | | | I/L | | | Yambes |
| ymc | | | I/L | | | Southern Muji |
| ymd | | | I/L | | | Muda |
| yme | | | I/E | | | Yameo |
| ymg | | | I/L | | | Yamongeri |
| ymh | | | I/L | | | Mili |
| ymi | | | I/L | | | Moji |
| (ymj) | | | I/L | | | Muji Yi |
| ymk | | | I/L | | | Makwe |
| yml | | | I/L | | | Iamalele |
| ymm | | | I/L | | | Maay |
| ymn | | | I/L | | | Sunum; Yamna |
| ymo | | | I/L | Torricelli | | Yangum Mon |
| ymp | | | I/L | | | Yamap |
| ymq | | | I/L | | | Qila Muji |
| ymr | | | I/L | Dravidian | | Malasar |
| yms | | | I/H | | | Mysian |
| (ymt) | | | I/E | spurious language | | Mator-Taygi-Karagas |
| ymx | | | I/L | | | Northern Muji |
| ymz | | | I/L | | | Muzi |
| yna | | | I/L | | | Aluo |
| ynb | | | I/L | Trans–New Guinea | Yaben | Yamben |
| ynd | | | I/E | | | Yandruwandha |
| yne | | | I/L | | | Lang'e |
| yng | | | I/L | | | Yango |
| (ynh) | | | I/L | spurious language | | Yangho |
| ynk | | | I/L | | | Naukan Yupik |
| ynl | | | I/L | | | Yangulam |
| ynn | | | I/E | | | Yana |
| yno | | | I/L | | | Yong |
| ynq | | | I/L | | | Yendang |
| yns | | | I/L | | | Yansi |
| ynu | | | I/E | | | Yahuna |
| yob | | | I/E | | | Yoba |
| yog | | | I/L | | | Yogad |
| yoi | | | I/L | | | Yonaguni |
| yok | | | I/L | | | Yokuts |
| (yol) | | | I/E | | | Yola |
| yom | | | I/L | | | Yombe |
| yon | | | I/L | Trans–New Guinea | Yongkom | Yongkom |
| yor | yo | yor | I/L | Niger–Congo | | Yoruba |
| (yos) | | | I/L | | | Yos |
| yot | | | I/L | | | Yotti |
| yox | | | I/L | | | Yoron |
| yoy | | | I/L | | | Yoy |
| ypa | | | I/L | | | Phala |
| ypb | | | I/L | | | Labo Phowa |
| ypg | | | I/L | | | Phola |
| yph | | | I/L | | | Phupha |
| (ypl) | | | I/L | | | Pula Yi |
| ypm | | | I/L | | | Phuma |
| ypn | | | I/L | | | Ani Phowa |
| ypo | | | I/L | | | Alo Phola |
| ypp | | | I/L | | | Phupa |
| (ypw) | | | I/L | | | Puwa Yi |
| ypz | | | I/L | | | Phuza |
| yra | | | I/L | | | Yerakai |
| yrb | | | I/L | | | Yareba |
| yre | | | I/L | | | Yaouré |
| (yri) | | | I/L | spurious language | | Yarí |
| yrk | | | I/L | | | Nenets |
| yrl | | | I/L | | | Nhengatu |
| yrm | | | I/L | | | Yirrk-Mel |
| yrn | | | I/L | | | Yerong |
| yro | | | I/L | Yanomam | | Yaroamë |
| yrs | | | I/L | | | Yarsun |
| yrw | | | I/L | | | Yarawata |
| yry | | | I/L | | | Yarluyandi |
| ysc | | | I/E | | | Yassic |
| ysd | | | I/L | | | Samatao |
| ysg | | | I/L | | | Sonaga |
| ysl | | | I/L | | | Yugoslavian Sign Language |
| ysm | | | I/L | | | Myanmar Sign Language |
| ysn | | | I/L | | | Sani |
| yso | | | I/L | | | Nisi (China) |
| ysp | | | I/L | | | Southern Lolopo |
| ysr | | | I/E | | | Sirenik Yupik |
| yss | | | I/L | | | Yessan-Mayo |
| ysy | | | I/L | | | Sanie |
| yta | | | I/L | | | Talu |
| ytl | | | I/L | | | Tanglang |
| ytp | | | I/L | | | Thopho |
| ytw | | | I/L | | | Yout Wam |
| yty | | | I/E | | | Yatay |
| yua | | | I/L | | | Yucatec Maya; Yucateco |
| yub | | | I/E | | | Yugambal |
| yuc | | | I/L | | | Yuchi |
| yud | | | I/L | | | Judeo-Tripolitanian Arabic |
| yue | | | I/L | Sino-Tibetan | 粵語/粤语; 廣東話/广东话 | Yue Chinese |
| yuf | | | I/L | | | Havasupai-Walapai-Yavapai |
| yug | | | I/E | Dené–Yeniseian? | Дьук | Yug |
| yui | | | I/L | | | Yurutí |
| yuj | | | I/L | | | Karkar-Yuri |
| yuk | | | I/E | | | Yuki |
| yul | | | I/L | | | Yulu |
| yum | | | I/L | | | Quechan |
| yun | | | I/L | | | Bena (Nigeria) |
| yup | | | I/L | | | Yukpa |
| yuq | | | I/L | | | Yuqui |
| yur | | | I/E | | | Yurok |
| (yus) | | | I/L | | | Chan Santa Cruz Maya |
| yut | | | I/L | | | Yopno |
| (yuu) | | | I/L | spurious language | | Yugh |
| yuw | | | I/L | | | Yau (Morobe Province) |
| yux | | | I/L | | | Southern Yukaghir |
| yuy | | | I/L | | | East Yugur |
| yuz | | | I/L | | | Yuracare |
| yva | | | I/L | | | Yawa |
| yvt | | | I/E | | | Yavitero |
| ywa | | | I/L | | | Kalou |
| ywg | | | I/L | | | Yinhawangka |
| ywl | | | I/L | | | Western Lalu |
| (ywm) | | | I/L | | | Wumeng Yi |
| ywn | | | I/L | | | Yawanawa |
| ywq | | | I/L | | | Wuding-Luquan Yi |
| ywr | | | I/L | | | Yawuru |
| ywt | | | I/L | | | Central Lalo; Xishanba Lalo |
| ywu | | | I/L | | | Wumeng Nasu |
| yww | | | I/E | | | Yawarawarga |
| yxa | | | I/E | | | Mayawali |
| yxg | | | I/E | | | Yagara |
| yxl | | | I/E | | | Yardliyawarra |
| yxm | | | I/E | | | Yinwum |
| yxu | | | I/E | | | Yuyu |
| yxy | | | I/E | | | Yabula Yabula |
| (yym) | | | I/L | | | Yuanjiang-Mojiang Yi |
| yyr | | | I/E | | | Yir Yoront |
| yyu | | | I/L | | | Yau (Sandaun Province) |
| yyz | | | I/L | | | Ayizi |
| yzg | | | I/L | | | E'ma Buyang |
| yzk | | | I/L | | | Zokhuo |

== Sources ==
- "ISO 639-2 Registration Authority". Library of Congress.
- "ISO 639-3 Registration Authority". SIL International.
- Lewis, M. Paul; Simons, Gary F.; Fennig, Charles D., eds. (2016). "Ethnologue: Languages of the World" (19th ed.). Dallas, Texas: SIL International.
