= ISO 639:q =

List of ISO 639-3 language codes starting with Q

This is a list of ISO 639-3 language codes starting with Q.

Index | a | b | c | d | e | f | g | h | i | j | k | l | m | n | o | p | q | r | s | t | u | v | w | x | y | z

Abbreviations are used in the table as follows:

- Scope: I = individual language, M = macrolanguage, S = special code
- Type: C = constructed, E = extinct (in recent times), H = historical (distinct from its modern form), L = living, S = special code

Deprecated codes are enclosed in (parentheses).

The column Family contains the generic English name of the language's family or macrolanguage.

| ISO 639 codes | | | Scope/Type | Family | Language names | |
| 639-3 | 639-1 | 639-2/B | Scope/Type | Family | Native | ISO name |
|---|---|---|---|---|---|---|
| qaa... qtz | | | — | | — | Reserved for local use. |
| qua | | | I/L | | | Quapaw |
| qub | | | I/L | Quechuan | | Huallaga Huánuco Quechua |
| quc | | | I/L | Maya | k'iche’ | K'iche'; Quiché |
| qud | | | I/L | Quichua | | Calderón Highland Quichua |
| que | qu | que | M/L | Quechuan | Runa Simi | Quechua |
| quf | | | I/L | Quechuan | | Lambayeque Quechua |
| qug | | | I/L | Quichua | | Chimborazo Highland Quichua |
| quh | | | I/L | Quechuan | | South Bolivian Quechua |
| qui | | | I/L | | | Quileute |
| (quj) | | | I/L | Quiché | | Joyabaj Quiché |
| quk | | | I/L | Quechuan | | Chachapoyas Quechua |
| qul | | | I/L | Quechuan | | North Bolivian Quechua |
| qum | | | I/L | | | Sipacapense |
| qun | | | I/E | | | Quinault |
| qup | | | I/L | Quechuan | | Southern Pastaza Quechua |
| quq | | | I/L | | | Quinqui |
| qur | | | I/L | Quechuan | | Yanahuanca Pasco Quechua |
| qus | | | I/L | Quichua | | Santiago del Estero Quichua |
| (qut) | | | I/L | Quiché | | West Central Quiché |
| (quu) | | | I/L | Quiché | | Eastern Quiché |
| quv | | | I/L | | | Sacapulteco |
| quw | | | I/L | Quichua | | Tena Lowland Quichua |
| qux | | | I/L | Quechuan | | Yauyos Quechua |
| quy | | | I/L | Quechuan | | Ayacucho Quechua |
| quz | | | I/L | Quechuan | | Cusco Quechua |
| qva | | | I/L | Quechuan | | Ambo-Pasco Quechua |
| qvc | | | I/L | Quechuan | | Cajamarca Quechua |
| qve | | | I/L | Quechuan | | Eastern Apurímac Quechua |
| qvh | | | I/L | Quechuan | | Huamalíes-Dos de Mayo Huánuco Quechua |
| qvi | | | I/L | Quichua | | Imbabura Highland Quichua |
| qvj | | | I/L | Quichua | | Loja Highland Quichua |
| qvl | | | I/L | Quechuan | | Cajatambo North Lima Quechua |
| qvm | | | I/L | Quechuan | | Margos-Yarowilca-Lauricocha Quechua |
| qvn | | | I/L | Quechuan | | North Junín Quechua |
| qvo | | | I/L | Quechuan | | Napo Lowland Quechua |
| qvp | | | I/L | Quechuan | | Pacaraos Quechua |
| qvs | | | I/L | Quechuan | | San Martín Quechua |
| qvw | | | I/L | Quechuan | | Huaylla Wanca Quechua |
| qvy | | | I/L | | | Queyu |
| qvz | | | I/L | Quichua | | Northern Pastaza Quichua |
| qwa | | | I/L | Quechuan | | Corongo Ancash Quechua |
| qwc | | | I/H | Quechuan | | Classical Quechua |
| qwh | | | I/L | Quechuan | | Huaylas Ancash Quechua |
| qwm | | | I/E | | | Kuman (Russia) |
| qws | | | I/L | Quechuan | | Sihuas Ancash Quechua |
| qwt | | | I/E | | | Kwalhioqua-Tlatskanai |
| qxa | | | I/L | Quechuan | | Chiquián Ancash Quechua |
| qxc | | | I/L | Quechuan | | Chincha Quechua |
| qxh | | | I/L | Quechuan | | Panao Huánuco Quechua |
| (qxi) | | | I/L | Quiché | | San Andrés Quiché |
| qxl | | | I/L | Quichua | | Salasaca Highland Quichua |
| qxn | | | I/L | Quechuan | | Northern Conchucos Ancash Quechua |
| qxo | | | I/L | Quechuan | | Southern Conchucos Ancash Quechua |
| qxp | | | I/L | Quechuan | | Puno Quechua |
| qxq | | | I/L | | Qaşqaycə | Qashqa'i |
| qxr | | | I/L | Quichua | | Cañar Highland Quichua |
| qxs | | | I/L | Sino-Tibetan | | Southern Qiang |
| qxt | | | I/L | Quechuan | | Santa Ana de Tusi Pasco Quechua |
| qxu | | | I/L | Quechuan | | Arequipa-La Unión Quechua |
| qxw | | | I/L | Quechuan | | Jauja Wanca Quechua |
| qya | | | I/C | | | Quenya |
| qyp | | | I/E | | | Quiripi |

== Sources ==
- "ISO 639-2 Registration Authority". Library of Congress.
- "ISO 639-3 Registration Authority". SIL International.
- Lewis, M. Paul; Simons, Gary F.; Fennig, Charles D., eds. (2016). "Ethnologue: Languages of the World" (19th ed.). Dallas, Texas: SIL International.
