= WGW =

WGW may refer to:

- Whitby Goth Weekend, a music festival in England
- WorldGenWeb, a genealogy non-profit
- Wagawaga language (New Guinea) (defunct ISO 639 code:WGW)
- Wigan Wallgate railway station, Greater Manchester, England (GBR code:WGW)
