= Okpe language =

Okpe may refer to:

- Okpe language (Northwestern Edo)
- Okpe language (Southwestern Edo)
