= Iya =

Iya may refer to:

== People ==
- Iya Abubakar, Nigerian politician
- Iya Arepina, Russian actress
- Iya Kiva (b. 1984), Ukrainian poet, translator, journalist, critic
- Iya Nacuaa Teyusi Ñaña, Mixtec ruler
- Iya Savvina, Soviet actress
- Iya Villania, Australian actress

== Places ==
- Iya, Iran, a village in East Azerbaijan Province, Iran
- Mount Iya, volcano in Indonesia
- Iya (river), river in Irkutsk Oblast in Russia
- Iya Station, railway station in Japan
- Iya Valley, valley in Japan

== Other uses ==
- Iya (mythology) in Lakota mythology
- Iyayu language, ISO 639-3 code "iya"
- Iya, the term in the Edo language for the Benin Moat

IYA may refer to:

- International Year of Astronomy (IYA2009)
