= Maziakpono (name) =

- Gender: Unisex
- Languages: Isoko, Urhobo

Origin
- Language: Delta State
- Origin: Southern Nigeria
- Meaning: We have arrived

listen

Maziakpono is a Nigerian given name and surname from Delta State which translates to "we have arrived" in Urhobo and Isoko language.

== Notable people ==
- Chico Ejiro (birth name Chico Aziakpono; died 2020), Nigerian movie director
