= IKH =

IKH may refer to:

- Ichimoku Kinkō Hyō, Ichimoku trading strategy
- ikh, the ISO 639-3 code for Ikhin language
- Isa Khel railway station, the station code IKH
