= EVH =

EVH may refer to:

- Eddie Van Halen
- Ena/Vasp homology proteins
- Endoscopic vessel harvesting
- Eucapnic voluntary hyperventilation, a test for exercise-induced bronchoconstriction
- Evans Head Memorial Aerodrome, in New South Wales, Australia
- Uvbie language
