= Urhobo =

Urhobo may refer to:

- Urhobo people, of Nigeria
- Urhobo language, their Edo language
