= Edesiri =

Given name of Yoruba

- Gender: Unisex
- Language: Urhobo

Origin
- Meaning: 'Patience is good'
- Region of origin: Nigeria

Edesiri is an Urhobo given name from Delta State, Nigeria. It means 'patience is good.'
