= Ivbie language =

Ivbie language may refer to:

- The North Ivbie language, an alternate name for the Okpela language
- The South Ivbie language, an alternate name for the Afenmai language
