= EHU =

EHU may refer to:

- ʻEhu, ancient Hawaiian nobleman
- Edge Hill University
- Ehueun language
- European Humanities University
- University of the Basque Country (Basque: Euskal Herriko Unibertsitatea)
- Ezhou Huahu Airport
- Ehu, the Hawaiian name for Etelis carbunculus, a type of fish
