= Degema =

Degema may refer to:

- Degema language, a Nigerian language
- Degema, Nigeria, a Local Government Area in Rivers State
