= Ovuzorie =

- Gender: Unisex
- Language(s): Isoko

Origin
- Meaning: Everyone has his/her destiny/head

listen

The name Ovuzorie is derived from Isoko language where it translates to "Everyone has his/her own destiny/head." It is a unisex given name and also serve as surnames for some people. other ways of writing and calling is Ovuigweyen which has a similar meaning to it.
