= Wagawaga language =

Wagawaga may be,

- Wagawaga language (Australia)
- Wagawaga language (New Guinea)
