= Ghotuo language =

Edoid language spoken in Nigeria

Ghotuo
- Native to: Nigeria
- Region: Edo State
- Native speakers: (9,000 cited 1994)
- Language family: Niger–Congo?: Atlantic–Congo; Volta–Niger; yeai; Edoid; North-Central; Yekhee; Ghotuo

Language codes
- ISO 639-3: aaa
- Glottolog: ghot1243

Ghotuo (also Otwa, Otuo) is a North Central Edoid language spoken in Edo State, mostly in the Owan and Akoko-Edo areas of Edo state, Nigeria.

== Grammar ==
=== Noun morphology ===
Ghotuo nouns are composed of a prefix and a stem. Stems usually consist of the structures "-V," "-CV," "-CVV," and "-CVCV." Prefixes typically consist of the structures "V-," "VV-," and "CV-." Across both types of morpheme, "V-" and "CV" are the most common structures. Nouns with the "u-" prefix in the singular, have a plural "i-" prefix. Similarly, nouns with a singular "o-" prefix have a plural "i-" prefix if the stem vowel is close. If the vowel is not close, then these nouns have a singular "-e" prefix. The prefix "-e" is also used as a plural prefix if the singular prefix of the noun is "-ɔ" and the stem vowel is not close.

Singular/Plural Prefix Endings
Singular	Plural	Example	Definition
u-	i-	ù-kì	moon
o-	i-	ò-fì	footpath
o-	e-	ō-tíé	a cherry like fruit
ɔ-	e-	ɔ-bè	enemy, evil
ɛ-	e-	ɛ-rùɛ	deer, duiker
ɛɛ-	io-	ɛɛ-wè	kola nut
ɛɛ-	ee-	ɛɛ-kɛ ēē	egg

Prefixes in Ghotuo are not exclusively determined by phonology, they are also defined by the grammatical class of the noun.

Prefixes by Grammatical Class
Singular	Plural	Function	Example	Definition
ɛɛ-	a-	Body parts	ɛɛ- ò (à-)	eye
a-	i-	Primarily man-made objects	à-bì	a kind of mat
a-	io-		à-mɛ	water
gha-	i-	Insects and small birds found in homes	ɡhā-hìhì	ant
gha-	-io	Utensils and animals	ɡhā-wà	a dog
gho-	-i		ɡhò-kì	market
gho-	-e		ɡhō-bè	leaf, book

There are numerous examples of Ghotuo nouns with unpaired prefixes.

Unpaired Nouns
Prefix	Example	Definition
i-	ì-lhè	insult
e-	ē-nhù	pounded yam
ɛ-	ɛ-khɔ	shame, shyness
a-	à-fɛ	home, house
o-	ō-fà	stinginess
u-	ū-sɔ	head
ghi-	ɡhì-kpō	forehead
ɡha-	ɡhà-kpā	Bald head
gho-	ɡhō-ɛ	path, road

Demonstratives are conveyed using prefixes. For instance, the prefix "ɔ-" is used when referring to a singular entity while "è-" is used for plural entities. Prefixation in Ghotuo is used for agreement markers; all plural nouns share the same agreement marker, and all the singular nouns share the same agreement marker. In some instances, prefixation may be used to transform a verb into an abstract noun. The verb "ɟâ," meaning "laugh," can be transformed into "ē-ɟà," meaning laughter, using prefixes. Stative nouns may also be formed by applying the prefix "ɔnhi-" to a stative verb. The word "obi," meaning "darkness," can be transformed to "ɔnhōbì," meaning "a black one." Sometimes this prefix can also be applied to a non-ideophonic adverb. For instance "dùkɛ," meaning short, can be transformed into "ɔnhī dùkɛ," meaning "a short one." Nouns may also be derived from verbs in relative clauses. In Ghotuo, Verbs interact with nouns to form Locative nouns. Prefixing a specific set of three body parts to another place noun creates more complex sentences in Ghotuo. The body parts involved are ūsɔ(mhì), meaning "head," ūdò, meaning "stomach," and àvɔ, meaning "legs." One example is the phrase "ūdóvbàɡhì," meaning "inside of the room."

The phrase "ɔnhī" can sometimes be used to indicate the origins of a married woman. For instance, the phrase "ɔnhī ɣɔnhíɣõ," means "a Yoruba woman." The phrase "ōnyẽ" is used to indicate that an individual is from a certain region For instance, "ōnyẽ ìɡbò" means "an Igbo person." "ɔnhī" and "onhi" may also be used to indicate time. The word " àmɛ," meaning "water," when transformed to "ɔnhīɣèmɛ" means "rain season." Placing the form "omhi" before a noun can transform it into a diminutive. If applied to "ɛ-wè," meaning "goat," it becomes "omhi ɛwè," meaning "little goat." Literally, the word "omhi" means child. It may be used in phrases such as "ōmhī mhɛ," meaning "my child." The words "vbāí," "kpɛɛkpɛ," and "ɡbei" can be applied to nouns to express a sense of totality. For example, the phrase "ìtīsá ɡbēī" means "all teachers."

Tonal reflexes are sometimes utilized to convey gerunds, verbal nouns, and agent nouns. For example, by applying a low tone to the phrase "ɔ dɛɡhōbè," meaning "he buys a book," it transforms into "one who buys a book." This rule only applies to simple clauses with one verb. In clauses with multiple verbs, the letter "m" is added to the end of the noun. Prefixes can also be applied to express the plurality of a phrase. For instance, the prefix "i-." when applied to the phrase "ɔwìƞʷàhɛkūhɛdā," transforms it into "ì wìƞʷàhɛkūhɛdā." This transforms the meaning from "one who throws clothes into the river," to "those who throw clothes into the river." Proper nouns in Ghotuo are often whole clauses or statements, typically they refer to circumstances of birth, philosophical statements, or the events in the subject's life.

=== Tone ===
Ghotuo is a terraced three-tone language. The three basic tones in Ghotuo are high, mid, and low. It experiences the downstep in the low and mid-tone levels, which means that in these tone levels, if two syllables have the same tone then the second syllable is lower than the first one. One analysis of tone in Ghotuo conducted by Kolawole Adeniyi, a researcher from Obafemi Awolowo University, found that Ghotuo speakers tended to remove downstep from their speech when speaking with non-native speakers. This indicates the downstep in Ghotuo is speaker-controlled. Downdrift is also present in Ghouto; the mid and high tones are progressively lowered by the low tones preceding them. Downdrift is not automatically present in every Ghotuo word with mid or high tones following low tones. However, it is present in every word where a low tone follows a mid or high tone. Ghotuo contains falling tones; the low tone falls if it is placed after a mid or high tone. There are also "mid-falling" and "high-falling" tones found in the language.

== Sample text ==
Word	Meaning
ɔ-kà	maize
ūù-ghì	dogs
ù-ɡì	basket
ɛɛ-kɛ	egg
ì-bia	children
ɔ-kàkà	grasshopper
ghī-lhɛlhɛ	tongue

== Bibliography ==
- Egbokhare, Francis O. (2022). "Unification and Harmonization of Afenmai Languages: Issues and Challenges". In Ekpenyong, Moses Effiong; Udoh, Imelda Icheji (eds.). Current Issues in Descriptive Linguistics and Digital Humanities: A Festschrift in Honor of Professor Eno-Abasi Essien Urua. Singapore: Springer Nature. p. 335. doi:10.1007/978-981-19-2932-8_24. ISBN 978-981-19-2932-8.
- Bankale, Oyetayo; Elugbe, Ben (2019). "Ghotuọ Noun Morphology". Journal of the Linguistic Association of Nigeria. 22 (2): 264–280. Archived (PDF) from the original on February 14, 2024 – via ResearchGate.
- Adeniyi, Kolawe (2012). "The role of Discourse in the typology of downsteps: Evidence from Ebira and Ghotuo" (PDF). International Society of Experimental Linguistics: 1–5. Archived (PDF) from the original on December 16, 2023.
- Bogers, Koen; Hulst, Harry van der; Mous, Marten (2016-09-26). The Phonological Representation of Suprasegmentals: Studies on African Languages Offered to John M. Stewart on his 60th Birthday. Walter de Gruyter GmbH & Co KG. pp. 51–62. ISBN 978-3-11-086629-2.
