= Edoid languages =

Subgroup of Volta–Niger languages in Africa

Edoid
- Geographic distribution: South-central Nigeria, west of the Niger River, south of the confluence of the Benue
- Linguistic classification: Niger–Congo?: Atlantic–Congo; Volta–Congo; Volta–Niger; YEAI; Akpes–Edoid; Edoid
- Proto-language: Proto-Edoid
- Subdivisions: Delta; North-Central; Northwestern; Southwestern

Language codes
- Glottolog: edoi1239

The Edoid languages are a few dozen languages spoken in southern Nigeria. Edoid-speaking ethnic groups are predominantly located in the States of Edo and Delta however, smaller Edoid-speaking communities are also present in the states of Ondo, Bayelsa, and Rivers. The term "Edoid" for the language group derives from its most widely spoken member, Edo, which is natively spoken in Southern Edo. Edoid languages collectively have approximately 10 million primary and secondary speakers.

== Classification ==
=== Elugbe (1989) ===
The following classification is based on that of Elugbe (1989).

- Edoid
  - Delta: Degema, Epie, Ẹgẹnẹ (Engenni)
  - North-Central
    - Edo: Edo (Bini), Ivbiosakon (Ora, Emai, Iuleha), Esan (Ishan)
    - Yekhee: Ghotuo, Yekhee, Enwan, Igwe, Ikpeshi, Okpela (Ivbie North, Arhe), Ososo, Sasaru, Uneme
    - ?Ihievbe
  - Northwestern:
    - Osse River: Ehuẹun–Ukue, Iyayu–Uhami
    - Southern Northwestern: Okpamheri, Akuku, Okpe, Oloma
    - ?Aduge
  - Southwestern: Isoko, Urhobo, Eruwa, Okpe, Uvbie

Ihievbe and Aduge are unclassified within their branches.

=== Lewis (2013) ===
An alternative classification of the Edoid languages by Lewis (2013:160):

- Proto-Edoid
  - North-Western
    - Okpella, North Ibie
    - Atte, Enwa, Ikpeshi
    - Ibilo, Dagbala, Aiyegunle, Somorika
    - Akuku
    - Okpe
  - North-Central
    - Ghotuo, Sasaru, Igwe, Ososo
    - Eese, Ihievbe, Uneme-Yekhee, Uokha-Uroe-Ake-Warake, Ikhin-Arokho, Esan, Bini
  - South-Western
    - Okpe
    - Urhobo
    - Isoko
    - Eruwa
  - Delta
    - Epie-Atisa
    - Egene (Engenni)
    - Degema

Lewis's study is an improvement on Elugbe's classification, as more languages were identified and classified. However, omitted the Uvbie of the South-Western Edoid branch (cf. Emoefe et al. (2017).)

== Names and locations ==
Below is a list of language names, populations, and locations from Blench (2019).

Language	Branch	Cluster	Dialects	Alternate spellings	Own name for language	Endonym(s)	Other names (location-based)	Other names for language	Exonym(s)	Speakers	Location(s)
Degema	Delta		Atala, spoken in Degema town, and Usokun spoken in Usokun–Degema	Dẹgẹma			Atala, Usokun	(Udekama not recommended)		10,000 (SIL)	Rivers State, Degema LGA
Engenni	Delta		Ediro, Inedua, and Ogua; Zarama in Yenagoa LGA	Ngene, Ẹgẹnẹ	Ẹgẹnẹ					10,000 (1963); 20,000 (1980 UBS)	Bayelsa State, Yenagoa and Ahoada LGAs Rivers State
Epie	Delta		Two clans, Epie and Atiṣa in at least three towns: Agudiama, Akẹnfai, Yẹneguẹ					Epie–Atissa, Epie–Atiṣa		12,000 (SIL)	Bayelsa State, Yenagoa LGA
Emai–Iuleha–Ora cluster	North-Central	Emai–Iuleha–Ora	Ivhimion. Spurious languages Ihievbe and Uokha are listed in Ethnologue (2009)					Kunibum	Ivbiosakon	estimated 100,000 plus (1987 Schaefer)	Edo State, Owan, LGA
Emai	North-Central	Emai–Iuleha–Ora								estimated 20–25,000 (1987 Schaefer)	
Iuleha	North-Central	Emai–Iuleha–Ora				Aoma				estimated 50,000 (1987 Schaefer)	
Ora	North-Central	Emai–Iuleha–Ora								estimated 30,000 (1987 Schaefer)	
Esan	North-Central		Many dialects	Ishan	Awain					183,000 (1952); 500,000 estimated in 1963: Okojie & Ejele (1987)	Bendel State (now Edo State and Delta State), Agbazilo, Okpebho, Owan and Etsako LGAs
Ikpeshi	North-Central									1,826 (Bradbury 1957)	Edo State, Etsako LGA
Etsako	North-Central		Auchi, Uzairue, South Ivbie, Uwepa–Uwano, (Weppa–Wano), Avbianwu (Fugar), Avbiele, Ivbiadaobi		Yẹkhee: not all speakers of the language recognise this as the name of the language.		Etsakọ	Iyẹkhee, Afenmai, Kukuruku (not recommended)		73,500 (1952), 150,000 (UBS 1987)	Edo State, Etsako, Agbako and Okpebho LGAs
Ghotuọ	North-Central						Otwa, Otuọ			9,000 (1952)	Edo State, Owan and Akoko–Edo LGAs
Ivbie North–Okpela–Arhẹ cluster	North-Central	Ivbie North–Okpela–Arhẹ								14,500 (1952); possibly 20,000 (1973 SIL)	Edo State, Etsako and Akoko–Ẹdo LGAs
Ivbie North	North-Central	Ivbie North–Okpela–Arhẹ									
Okpela	North-Central	Ivbie North–Okpela–Arhẹ		Okpella, Ukpilla							
Arhẹ	North-Central	Ivbie North–Okpela–Arhẹ		Atẹ, Ate, Atte							
Yẹkhee	North-Central		Auchi, Uzairue, South Ivbie, Uwepa–Uwano, (Weppa–Wano), Avbianwu (Fugar), Avbiele, Ivbiadaobi		Yẹkhee: not all speakers of the language recognise this as the name of the language.		Etsakọ: the language is not the only language listed as being spoken in Etsako LGA.	Iyẹkhee, Afenmai, Kukuruku (not recommended)		73,500 (1952), 150,000 (UBS 1987)	Edo State, Etsako, Agbako and Okpebho LGAs
Ẹdo	North-Central			Oviedo, Ovioba			Benin	Ẹdo (Binĩ)		203,000 (1952), 1,000,000 (1987 UBS)	Edo State, Ovia, Oredo and Orhionmwon LGAs
Ọsọsọ	North-Central									6,532 (1957 Bradbury)	Edo State, Akoko–Edo LGA
Sasaru–Enwan–Igwẹ	North-Central		Enwan, Igwẹ, Sasaru							3,775 (1952)	Edo State, Akoko–Edo LGA
Unẹmẹ	North-Central			Uleme, Ileme, Ineme						6,000 (1952).	Edo State, Etsako, Agbazilo and Akoko–Edo LGAs. The Uneme are a blacksmith group and live scattered among other language groups.
Uhami	North-Western							Isua		5,498 (1963)	Ondo State, Akoko–South and Owo LGAs
Ukue	North-Western						Ukpe, Ẹkpenmi			5,702 (1963)	Ondo State, Akoko South LGA
Ehuẹun	North-Western						Ẹkpenmi, Ekpimi, Epimi			5,766 (1963)	Ondo State, Akoko South LGA
Iyayu	North-Western								Idoani	9,979 (1963)	Ondo State, one quarter of Idoani town
Ẹmhalhẹ	North-Western						Somorika (Semolika)			249 in Semolina town (Temple 1922)	Edo State, Akoko–Edo LGA
Ọkpamheri	North-Western		Ọkpamheri means ‘we are one’: Okulosho (Okurosho), Western Okpamheri, Emhalhe (Emarle, Somorika, Semolika). Various.	Opameri		Aduge (appears to be a town name)				18,136 (1957 Bradbury); 30,000 (1973 SIL)	Edo State, Akoko–Edo LGA, Kwara State, Oyi LGA
Ọkpẹ–Idesa–Akuku	North-Western		Ọkpẹ, Idesa, Akuku								Edo State, Akoko–Edo LGA
Ọlọma	North-Western									353 (1957 Bradbury)	Edo State, Akoko–Edo LGA
Ẹrụwa	South-Western			Erohwa, Erakwa, Arokwa							Delta State, Isoko LGA
Isoko	South-Western		various					Igabo, Sobo (see also under Urhobo)	Biotu (not recommended)	At least 74,000 (1952 REB); 300,000 (1980 UBS)	Delta State, Isoko and Ndokwa LGAs
Okpẹ	South-Western			Ukpɛ						8,722 (1957 Bradbury)	Delta State, Okpe LGA
Urhobo	South-Western		Several dialects, Agbarho accepted as standard. Okpe and Uvbiẹ, often regarded as dialects of Urhobo, are treated as distinct languages (q.v.) on purely linguistic grounds	Sobo (not recommended) (See also Isoko)					Biotu (See also Isoko)	at least 173,000 (1952 REB); 340,000 (1973 SIL)	Delta State, Ethiope and Ughelli LGAs
Uvbiẹ	South-Western			Uvwie, Evrie, Uvhria, Effurum, Effurun, Evhro (not recommended)						6,000 (1952)	Delta State, Ethiope LGA
Fon	South			Dahomey			Gbe			5,000,000 (1957 Bradbury)	Benin Republic
Ewe	East-Ghana			Togo			Gbe			10,000,000 (1957 Bradbury)	Ghana, Togo

== Comparative vocabulary ==
Sample basic vocabulary for some northern Edoid languages from Lewis (2013):

Language	eye	ear	nose	tooth	tongue	mouth	blood	bone	tree	water	eat	name
Ghotuo	ɛ́ó	íhɔ̀wè	ízúé	ɛ̄kɔ̄	nímɛ̀lè	únù	ādɛ̄	ūgūā	ɔ̀kpótā	āmɛ̄	ījé	évà
Sasaru	rɛ̄rō	wózɔ́	ízúé	lɛ̂ːkɔ̄	úrɛ̀rɛ̄	únú	ɔ̀rà	úgúá	ótá	āmɛ̄	réʒí	ōvā
Ikhin	ɛ́ɣó	ɛ̀ɣɔ̀	èwè	áká	úwɛ̀rɛ́	ùnù	ɔ́rá	ìgùà	òrhà	ámɛ́	èmāèēè	èvà
Arokho	ɛ̄xō	éxɔ̄	íwè	ākɔ̄	óxɛ̀rɛ̄	únù	ɔja	úgùà	úràì	āmɛ̄	émàē	évà
Uroe	ɛ̄xō	èkɛ̃̀ ̀	íwè	àkù̃	ɔ́rɛ̄mì	únù	ɛ̀rè	ák͡pókà	órà̃	āmɛ̄	émírémì	êːɲì
Igwe (Sale)	ɛ̄xō	óxɔ̀	ísúè	ākɔ̄	íɲɛ̀rɛ̀	ùnù	ɔ̀rà	ígúá	ítá ̀	àmɛ̀	īdɛ̄ré	úrâːmī
Igwe (Oke)	ɛ̀rō	wórɔ̀	ísúè	ɛ̄kō	ínɛ̀nɛ̀	únù	ɔ̄rá	ɔ̄tɛ̄kū	úkánɔ́sínóríbè	āmɛ̄	ìlélé	óvà
Ake	ōk͡pɛ́xò	exɔ	íwè	àk͡pàkò	úrɛ̀mì	únù	ɔ́ràì	ráì	únà	àmɛ̀	ùgbài	éìɲì
Okpuje	ɛ̄xō	êːxɔ̀	érùè	ákɔ̄̃	óxɛ̀mì	únù	ɛ̄rē	ák͡púkà	órà	àmɛ̀	ébàè	ēhī
Sobongida	ɛ̄xō	e̋ːxɔ̀	éwè	ākū̃	óxɛ̀mì	únù	ɛ̄rē	āk͡pôːkà	órà	àmè	ébàē	éhì

== Phonology ==
Proto-Edoid is reconstructed as having a contrast between oral and nasal consonants and oral and nasal vowels typical for the region. However, in some Edoid languages nasal vowels have been reanalyzed as allophones of oral vowels after nasal consonants, and in others nasal consonants have been reanalyzed as allophones of oral consonants before nasal vowels, reducing the number of phonemically nasal consonants. Urhobo retains three nasals, /m, n, ɲ/, and has five oral consonants with nasal allophones, /ɺ, l, ʋ, j, w/; in Edo this is reduced to one phonemic nasal, /m/, but eight additional consonants with nasal allophones, /p, b, t, d, k, ɡ, kp, ɡb/; and in Ukue there are no indisputably phonemic nasals and only two consonants with nasal allophones, /l, β/.

== See also ==
- List of Proto-Edoid reconstructions (Wiktionary)

== Bibliography ==
- Frank Kügler, Caroline Féry, Ruben Van De Vijver (2009) Variation and Gradience in Phonetics and Phonology
- Elugbe, Ben Ohiọmamhẹ. 1989a. "Edoid". In Bendor-Samuel (Ed.), The Niger–Congo Languages. Lanham: The United Press of America. 291-304.
- Elugbe, Ben Ohiọmamhẹ. 1989b. Comparative Edoid: phonology and lexicon. Delta Series No. 6. Port Harcourt: University of Port Harcourt Press.
- Blench, Roger. Delta Edoid wordlists.

This article incorporates text available under the CC BY 3.0 license.
