= Ukue language =

Edoid language of Ondo State, Nigeria

Ukue
- Native to: Nigeria
- Region: Ondo State
- Native speakers: (14,000 cited 2000)
- Language family: Niger–Congo?: Atlantic–Congo; Volta–Niger; yeai; Edoid; Northwestern; Osse River; Ukue

Language codes
- ISO 639-3: uku
- Glottolog: ukue1238

Ukue (Epinmi) is an Edoid language of Ondo State, Nigeria. It is sometimes considered the same language as Ehuẹun.

== Phonology ==
Ukue has a rather reduced system, compared to proto-Edoid, of seven vowels; these form two harmonic sets, /i e a o u/ and /i ɛ a ɔ u/.

The language arguably has no phonemic nasal stops; [m, n] alternate with [β, l], depending on whether the following vowel is oral or nasal. Unusually, it has fricatives but no sibilants. The inventory is:

	Labial	Dental	Alveolar	Palatal	Velar	Labio-velar	Glottal
Plosive	b	t̪ d̪	t d		k ɡ	k͡p ɡ͡b	
Fricative	f v						h
Rhotic*			r̝				
Rhotic*			r				
Approximant	β [m]		l [n]	j		w	

(*See Edo for a likely interpretation of the two rhotics.)
