= Akuku language =

Edoid language of Nigeria

Akuku
- Native to: Nigeria
- Region: Edo State
- Language family: Niger–Congo?: Atlantic–Congo; Volta–Niger; yeai; Edoid; Northwestern; Akuku

Language codes
- ISO 639-3: ayk
- Glottolog: akuk1235

Akuku is an Edoid language of Nigeria.
