= Mayabic languages =

Extinct language family of Australia

Mayabic
- Mayi
- Geographic distribution: Queensland
- Linguistic classification: Pama–Nyungan: Mayabic

Language codes
- Glottolog: maya1279
- Mayabic languages (green) among other Pama–Nyungan (tan)

Mayabic, or Mayi, is a small family of extinct Australian Aboriginal languages of Queensland. They were once classified as Paman, but now as a separate branch of Pama–Nyungan.

The languages are:

- Mayi-Kutuna, Mayi-Kulan (incl. Mayi-Thakurti, Mayi-Yapi), Ngawun (incl. Wunumara)

According to Dixon (2002), Wunumara may have been a dialect of Ngawun or of Mayi-Kulan, which may have been a single language. Bowern (2011 [2012]), however, lists all six of the above as separate languages.
