= Degema language =

Edoid language of Nigeria

Dẹgẹma
- Native to: Nigeria
- Region: Rivers State
- Native speakers: (10,000 cited 1999)
- Language family: Niger–Congo?: Atlantic–Congo; Volta–Congo; Volta–Niger; yeai; Akpes–Edoid; Edoid; Delta Edoid; Degema–Engenni; Dẹgẹma

Language codes
- ISO 639-3: deg
- Glottolog: dege1246

Dẹgẹma is an Edoid language spoken in two separate communities on Degema Island in the Niger Delta, Nigeria, by about 120,000 people, according to 1991 census figures (including projection figures for the two Dẹgẹma-speaking communities). The two communities are Usokun-Degema and Degema Town in the Degema Local Government Area in Rivers State. Each community speaks a mutually intelligible variety of Dẹgẹma, known by the names of the communities speaking them: the Usokun variety (spoken in Usokun-Degema) and the Degema Town variety (spoken in Degema Town). Both varieties are similar in their phonological, morphological, syntactic and semantic properties.

No standard variety has so far emerged between the two varieties of Dẹgẹma. However, there appear to be more scholarly and descriptive linguistic publications on the Usokun variety than on the Degema Town variety.

The Dẹgẹma language is not also called "Atala" or "Udekaama", as stated in some publications. Atala is the alternative name for one of the Degema-speaking communities (Degema Town), and Udekaama is the name of a clan (which comprises Usokun-Degema and Degema Town). Similarly, "Dekema" is not an alternative name for the Degema language as contained in the entry for Degema in the Ethnologue.

== Phonology ==
Dẹgẹma is the only Niger-Congo language to match the vowel inventory reconstructed for Proto-Ijoid. There are ten vowels, in two harmonic sets: /i e a o u/ and /ɪ ɛ ə ɔ ʊ/.

Dẹgẹma has 24 consonants (including labialized velar-glottal sounds):

	Labial		Alveolar		Post- alveolar	Velar		Labial(ized) /velar/glottal	
Plosive	p	b	t	d	dʒ	k	g	kp	gb
Nasal		m		n	ɲ		ŋ		ŋʷ
Implosive		ɓ		ɗ					
Trill				r					
Fricative	f	β	s					h	
Approximant				l	j				w

== Writing System ==
Degema Alphabet
a	ạ	b	ḅ	d	ḍ	e	ẹ	f	g
gb	i	ị	j	k	kp	l	m	n	nw
ny	ñ	o	ọ	p	r	s	t	u	ụ
ụu	v	w	y	z					

== Degema history ==
Oral tradition asserts that the Degema people (originally part of the Engenni people) migrated from Benin (in what is now the Edo State of Nigeria) to Ewu in present-day Engenni, in the Ahoada Local Government Area of Rivers State. According to Mark Roman (a native of Engenni and a staff member at the University of Port Harcourt), the people of present-day Degema settled at Ewu (near Akinima) when they left Benin with other groups who settled at Okilogua in Engenni (not in Akinima, as claimed). Roman asserts that Ewu is also in Okilogua. At Ewu, there was a split which took some of the inhabitants to Enuedua (Joinkrama) (forming the Enuedua group), some to Ediro (forming the Ediro group) and some to Ogua, forming the Ogua group. These groups make up the Engenni community. Roman also asserts that the Degema people belonged to the Ogua group.

The split at Ewu was in due to a disagreement over fish belonging to all the people living there. Some of those who contributed their own water to the cooking of fish did not get their share of the water after the cooking was done, not considering that water evaporates when heated. Those aggrieved decided to leave Ewu, and the name Udekaama became associated with the aggrieved group.

The Udekaama group went to the uninhabited Degema Island around the 15th century CE and settled at Ipokuma ("headland" or "cape" in Dẹgẹma), now known as Doctor’s Farm. The headland is the part of Degema Island adjacent to an uninhabited island on which Abonnema (a Kalabari-speaking community in the Akuku-Toru Local Government Area of Rivers State is situated. Udekaama is an umbrella term for two groups: Usokun-Degema and Degema Town (Atala) (headed by Ugu and Ekeze, respectively, who led the two groups from Ewu to Ipokuma. Ekomburu (Obonoma) is one of the groups comprising the Udekaama clan.

The settlement at Ipokuma was before the arrival of the Abonnema (about 1882) and the Kalabari tribe:

A fourth group who were already in their present locations by the time the first two groups came to their new settlements, and who to varying degrees, became associated and identified with Kalabari – Obonoma, Bukuma, Old Bakana, Dekema [sic], Angulama. Some of these have been fully integrated into the Kalabari Kingdom; others (Dekema [sic], Bukuma) still maintain their originality and have relatively tenuous culture-linguistic and conjugal relationship with Kalabari people.

— Degema Local Government 1987: 17

At Ipokuma Ugu and Ekeze led Usokun-Degema and Degema Town, respectively, north to their present sites for fishing, hunting and farming. Neither of these two communities considers itself (or its leader) subordinate to the other; the two groups consider themselves independent.

The name Degema is a bastardized form of Udekaama (the name by which colonists referred to the Udekaama people), which may have resulted from the Kalabari mispronunciation of Udekaama as Dekema (which, in turn, became Degema on contemporary documents. Udekaama may also be an unwelcome reminder of the rift between their forefathers at Ewu. Udekaama is still found in official documents, mainly due to the assertion of ethnic identity by the Degema people (who are surrounded by Kalabari-speaking communities). The people of Degema are linguistically and culturally distinct from their Kalabari neighbours (The Kalabari people speak Kalabari, an Eastern ijaw language spoken in the Akuku Toru and Asari-Toru Local Government Areas of Rivers State. Kalabari is also spoken in some parts of the Degema Local Government Area.

Degema refers not only to the language spoken by the inhabitants of Usokun-Degema and Degema Town, it also refers to the people themselves, the land on which they live and their government (the administrative headquarters of the Degema Local Government Area).

== See also ==
- Defaka
