= Okpela language =

Edoid language of Nigeria

Okpella
- Ivbie North – Okpella – Arhe
- Native to: Nigeria
- Region: Edo State
- Ethnicity: Okpella, Ate, Okpekpe
- Native speakers: (20,000 cited 1973)
- Language family: Niger–Congo?: Atlantic–Congo; Volta–Niger; yeai; Edoid; North-Central; Yekhee; Okpella
- Dialects: Ivbie North; Okpela; Arhe

Language codes
- ISO 639-3: atg
- Glottolog: ivbi1241

Okpella is a dialect cluster of Edoid languages in Nigeria.
