= Mayi-Kulan language =

Extinct Australian Aboriginal language

Mayi-Kulan
- Maykulan
- Native to: Australia
- Region: Cape York Peninsula, Queensland
- Ethnicity: Maikulan, Maithakari, Maijabi
- Extinct: (date missing)
- Language family: Pama–Nyungan: Mayabic; Mayi-Kulan
- Dialects: Mayi-Kulan; Mayi-Thakurti; Mayi-Yapi

Language codes
- ISO 639-3: Variously: xyk – Mayi-Kulan (Wunumara) xyt – Mayi-Thakurti xyj – Mayi-Yapi
- Glottolog: mayk1239
- AIATSIS: G25 Mayi-Kulan, G16 Mayi-Thakurti, G20 Mayi-Yapi
- ELP: Mayi-Kulan
- Mayi-Thakurti
- Mayi-Yapi

Mayi-Kulan is an extinct Mayi language formerly spoken on the Cape York Peninsula of Queensland, Australia.

Mayi-Kulan and its dialects may be dialects of Ngawun/Wunumara.

== Phonology ==
=== Consonants ===
	Peripheral		Laminal		Apical	
	Labial	Velar	Dental	Alveolo- palatal	Alveolar	Retroflex
Plosive	p	k	t̪	t̠ʲ	t	ʈ
Nasal	m	ŋ	n̪	n̠ʲ	n	ɳ
Rhotic					ɾ	
Lateral				l̠ʲ	l	ɭ
Approximant	w			j		ɻ

- Unlike most other Mayi languages, /l̠ʲ/ in Mayi-Thakurti, and Wunumara is phonemic.

=== Vowels ===
	Front	Back
Close	i, iː	u, uː
Open	a, aː	

== Vocabulary ==
Below is a basic vocabulary list from Blake (1981).

English	Mayi-Yabi
man	pantyil
woman	panya
mother	yakura
father	mutyu
head	ngankul
eye	mili
nose	kunyin
ear	pinar
mouth	yatyin
tongue	ngulan
tooth	yatyayin
hand	malaru
breast	ṯampu
stomach	ngapurra
urine	kipara
faeces	waṉṯu
thigh	ṯarru
foot	tyana
bone	ṯimul
blood	kapul
dog	yampi
snake	tyinyur
kangaroo	matyumpa
possum	kakuny
fish	palpi
spider	kupu
mosquito	wungkuny
emu	tyungkupari
eaglehawk	kurriṯala
crow	waya
sun	maṉṯara
moon	kukara
star	tyinpi
stone	mirnti
water	kamu
camp	makiya
fire	yangu
smoke	kumiri
food	maṉṯa
meat	kaṯi
stand	ṯari
sit	yini
see	ṉama
go	wapi
get	mantyi
hit	puntyi
I	ngayu
you	yuntu
one	kuruny
two	pulakara
