= Ikpeshi language =

Edoid language spoken in Nigeria

Ikpeshi
- Native to: Nigeria
- Region: Bendel State
- Native speakers: (5,300 cited 2000)
- Language family: Niger–Congo?: Atlantic–Congo; Volta–Niger; yeai; Edoid; North-Central; Yekhee; Ikpeshi

Language codes
- ISO 639-3: ikp
- Glottolog: ikpe1243

Ikpeshi is an Edoid language based in the northwest of Edo State, Nigeria. Ikpeshi is a minority language. Its exclusive vocabulary may stem from diffusion within the Northwestern Edo area. It does not have an orthography or literature, according to a study by the Nigerian Educational Research and Development Council.
