= Uvbie language =

Niger–Congo language of Nigeria

Uvwie
- Uvwie
- Native to: Nigeria
- Region: Delta State
- Ethnicity: Urhobo
- Native speakers: (20,000 cited 2000)
- Language family: Niger–Congo?: Atlantic–Congo; Volta–Niger; yeai; Edoid; Southwestern; Uvwie

Language codes
- ISO 639-3: evh
- Glottolog: uvbi1238

Uvwiẹ or Ẹphrọn (Effurun) is a Niger Delta language spoken by the Uvwie people of southern Nigeria. It is classified alongside Urhobo, Okpe, Isoko and Eruwa as co-ordinate members of South-western Edoid branch of Proto Edoid language spoken by the Uvwie people of southern Nigeria.

== Phonology ==
The phonemic inventory of Uvwie, amongst other things, consists of seven vowels. Although earlier studies identified nine vowels in two harmonic sets, /i e a o u/ and /ɪ ɛ a ɔ ʊ/.

The consonant system is somewhat conservative, and nearly the same as that of Urhobo. The only significant differences are the loss of ɸ, ɣ, and of the distinction between l and n: these alternate, depending on whether the following vowel is oral or nasal. /ɾ, ʋ, j, w/ also have nasal allophones before nasal vowels.

	Labial	Alveolar	Palatal	Velar	Labio-velar	Glottal
Nasal	m		ɲ			
Plosive	p b	t d	c ɟ	k ɡ	k͡p ɡ͡b	
Fricative	f v	s z	ʃ dʒ			h
Trill		r				
Flap		ɾ				
Approximant	ʋ	l [n]	j		w	
