= Igwe language =

Edoid language of Edo State, Nigeria

Igwe
- Native to: Nigeria
- Region: Edo State
- Native speakers: (48,000 cited 2000)
- Language family: Niger–Congo?: Atlantic–Congo; Volta–Niger; yeai; Edoid; North-Central; Yekhee; Igwe

Language codes
- ISO 639-3: igw
- Glottolog: igwe1238

Igwe is an Edoid language of Edo State, Nigeria.
