= Oloma language =

Edoid language of Nigeria

Oloma
- Native to: Nigeria
- Region: Edo State
- Language family: Niger–Congo?: Atlantic–Congo; Volta–Niger; yeai; Edoid; Northwestern; Oloma

Language codes
- ISO 639-3: olm
- Glottolog: olom1241

Oloma is an Edoid language of Nigeria.
