= Enwan language =

Edoid language spoken in Nigeria

Enwan
- Native to: Nigeria
- Region: Edo State
- Native speakers: 14,000 (2006)
- Language family: Niger–Congo?: Atlantic–Congo; Volta–Niger; yeai; Edoid; North-Central; Yekhee; Enwan

Language codes
- ISO 639-3: env
- Glottolog: enwa1246

Enwan is an Edoid language of Edo State, Nigeria.
