= Uneme language =

Edoid language of Nigeria

Uneme
- uneme nnekua
- Native to: Nigeria
- Region: Edo State
- Native speakers: (20,000 cited 2000)
- Language family: Niger–Congo?: Atlantic–Congo; Volta–Niger; yeai; Edoid; North-Central; Yekhee; Uneme

Language codes
- ISO 639-3: une
- Glottolog: unem1238

Uneme is an Edoid language and sub-saharan group of Nigeria located in the Edo State.

== History ==
According to Dr. Osaren Solomon Boniface Omoregie's book, "The Iron Makers of the Great Benin," Uneme Erhurun expanded as a hilltop meeting point for Uneme people escaping the effects of war. This led to the development of a community skilled in iron goods production, marketing, and spiritual protection.

Founding Ancestors and Etymology The author of "Cultural History of the Uneme" states that there were four founding ancestors of Uneme Erhurun: Imiohue, Uzanu, Ekpadi, and Oboro. The name "Uneme Erhurun" derives from Erhurun, meaning "Hill," specifically the Atagba hill where the founders settled.

Uneme Erhurun is situated in the south-east of Uneme Akpama, surrounded by other Uneme and non-Uneme sub-groups, including the Okpella.
