= Ososo language =

Edoid language of Nigeria

Ososo
- Ọ̀sọ́sọ̀
- Native to: Nigeria
- Region: Edo State
- Ethnicity: Ososo
- Native speakers: (19,000 cited 2000)
- Language family: Niger–Congo?: Atlantic–Congo; Volta–Niger; yeai; Edoid; North-Central; Yekhee; Ososo

Language codes
- ISO 639-3: oso
- Glottolog: osos1238

Ososo is an Edoid language of Nigeria.
