= WorldGenWeb =

The WorldGenWeb Project (WGW) is a non-profit, volunteer based organization founded in 1996 and dedicated to providing genealogical and historical records and resources for world-wide access.

The goal is to have every region in the world represented by a website and hosted by researchers who are familiar with the region. The world is divided into countries, province/states/counties etc. each having web sites identifying genealogy resources.

In 2016 the WGW was rated as one of the best websites for tracing immigrant and ethnic ancestors and Family Tree Magazine named the site one of the "Best Big Genealogy Sites" in 2010.
