= Okpamheri language =

Edoid language of Nigeria

Okpamheri
- Native to: Nigeria
- Native speakers: 92,000 (2021)
- Language family: Niger–Congo?: Atlantic–Congo; Volta–Niger; yeai; Edoid; Northwestern; Southern NW; Okpamheri

Language codes
- ISO 639-3: opa – inclusive code Individual code: adu – language of Aduge village
- Glottolog: okpa1238

Okpamheri (Opameri) is an Edoid language of Nigeria. The number of speakers is not known; there were about 30,000 people who spoke Okpamheri (Opameri) language in 1973. The language is moribund today.
