= Ikhin language =

Language of Nigeria

Ikhin
- Arokho
- Native to: Nigeria
- Region: Owan East LGA, Edo State
- Language family: Niger–Congo?: Atlantic–Congo; Volta–Niger; yeai; Edoid; North-Central; Ikhin
- Dialects: Ikhin; Arokho

Language codes
- ISO 639-3: ikh
- Glottolog: ikhi1234

Ikhin, or Arokho, is an Edoid language of Edo State, Nigeria.

Ikhin is spoken in the Ikhin area of Owan East LGA, Edo State.

Its phonology and lexicon have been described in two University of Ibadan linguistics dissertations.
