= Engenni language =

Edoid language of Nigeria

Engenni
- Ẹgẹnẹ
- Native to: Nigeria
- Region: Bayelsa State, Rivers State
- Ethnicity: Engenni people
- Native speakers: (20,000 cited 1980)
- Language family: Niger–Congo?: Atlantic–Congo; Volta–Niger; yeai; Edoid; Delta; Engenni

Language codes
- ISO 639-3: enn
- Glottolog: enge1239

Engenni (Ẹgẹnẹ) is an Edoid language of Nigeria.

== Grammar ==
Engenni is a fairly isolating language, having little affixation. There is no plural form for words. It has definite articles, but no indefinite articles. There is a two-contrast with regard to demonstratives, while pronominal and adnominal demonstratives are identical (as in English). Verbs are marked for perfective/imperfective aspect, but there is no past tense.

Engenni is an SVO language that uses prepositions. Adjectives, demonstratives, and numerals follow the noun they describe. Yes–no questions are marked with a special particle, which goes at the end of the question. Negation is indicated by a change in tone.

== Writing System ==
Engenni has been written since the 1930s, initially in leaflets, posters and religious hymns, or a translation of the Bible. It took several decades before non-religious literary works were published in English. In the 1970s, several literacy works were published by Joycelyn Clevenger or Mosaic Urugba with the Rivers Readers Project. A translation of the New Testament, Baibulu Eba Fai was published in 1977 by World Home Bible League. An alphabet with 9 vowels and 25 consonants is used in epoch.

In 2011, a new alphabet with 10 vowels and 30 consonants was adopted and published.

Engenni alphabet (2011)
a	ạ	b	ḅ	ch	d	ḍ	e	ẹ	f	g	gb	gw	i	ị	j	k	kp	kw	l	m	n	ny	nw	o	ọ	p	r	s	sh	sw	t	u	ụ	v	w	y	z	ẓ
