= Eruwa language =

Edoid language of Nigeria

Ẹrụwa
- Native to: Nigeria
- Region: Delta State
- Native speakers: 850 (2018)
- Language family: Niger–Congo?: Atlantic–Congo; Volta–Niger; yeai; Edoid; Southwestern; Ẹrụwa

Language codes
- ISO 639-3: erh
- Glottolog: eruw1238
- ELP: Erohwa

Ẹrụwa is an Edoid language of Nigeria.

== Phonology ==
The Ẹrụwa vowel system is hardly reduced from that reconstructed for proto-Edoid. There are nine vowels in two harmonic sets, /i e a o u/ and /ɪ ɛ a ɔ ʊ/.

The language arguably has no phonemic nasal stops; [m, n] alternate with [b, l], depending on whether the following vowel is oral or nasal. The approximants /ʋ, ɹ, j, w/ also have nasal allophones. The inventory is:

	Labial	Alveolar	Palatal	Velar	Labio-velar	Glottal
Plosive	p b [m]	t d		k ɡ	k͡p ɡ͡b	
Fricative	f v	s z		x ɣ		h
Approximant		l [n]				
Approximant	ʋ	ɹ	j		w	
