= Uhami language =

Edoid language of Ondo State, Nigeria

Uhami
- Native to: Nigeria
- Region: Ondo State
- Native speakers: (14,000 cited 2000)
- Language family: Niger–Congo?: Atlantic–Congo; Volta–Niger; yeai; Akokoid; Northwestern; Osse River; Uhami

Language codes
- ISO 639-3: uha
- Glottolog: uham1238

Uhami (Ishua) is an Akokoid language of the Ondo State, Nigeria.

An Uhami speaker
