= Ivbiosakon language =

Edoid language spoken in Edo, Nigeria

Ivbiosakon
- Aoma
- Native to: Nigeria
- Region: Edo State
- Native speakers: (100,000 cited 1987)
- Language family: Niger–Congo?: Atlantic–Congo; Volta–Niger; yeai; Edoid; North-Central; Edo; Ivbiosakon
- Dialects: Emai; Ora; Iuleha (Afenmai, Aoma); Ivhimion; ?Ihievbe (Isewe)

Language codes
- ISO 639-3: ema – inclusive code Individual code: ihi – Ihievbe
- Glottolog: emai1241

Ivbiosakon, Emai-Iuleha-Ora, Kunibum, or Aoma, is an Edoid language of Edo State, Nigeria.

According to the Glottolog entry, Ihievbe is also a part of the Emai-Iuleha-Ora language despite having a separate ISO 639-3 code ihi.

== Phonology ==
Aoma dialect has a rather reduced system, compared to proto-Edoid, of seven vowels; these form two harmonic sets, /i e a o u/ and /i ɛ a ɔ u/.

It has only one clearly phonemic nasal stop, /m/; [n] alternates with [l], depending on whether the following vowel is oral or nasal. (The other approximants, /ɹ j w h/, are also nasalized in this position: see Edo language for a similar situation.) The inventory is:

| | Labial | Alveolar | Palatal | Velar | Labio-velar | Glottal |
|---|---|---|---|---|---|---|
| Nasal | m | l [n] | | | | |
| Plosive | p b | t d | | k ɡ | k͡p ɡ͡b | |
| Fricative | f v | s z | | x ɣ | | |
| Trill | | r | | | | |
| Approximant | | ɹ | j | | w | h |
