= Okpe language (Northwestern Edo) =

Edoid language of Nigeria

Okpe
- Native to: Nigeria
- Region: Edo State
- Ethnicity: Afenmai
- Native speakers: 8,700 (2004)
- Language family: Niger–Congo?: Atlantic–Congo; Volta–Niger; yeai; Edoid; Northwestern; Okpe

Language codes
- ISO 639-3: okx
- Glottolog: okpe1249

Okpe is an Edoid language of Nigeria.
