= Ehueun language =

Edoid language of Ondo State, Nigeria

Ehuẹun
- Native to: Nigeria
- Region: Ondo State
- Native speakers: (14,000 cited 2000)
- Language family: Niger–Congo?: Atlantic–Congo; Volta–Niger; yeai; Edoid; Northwestern; Osse River; Ehuẹun

Language codes
- ISO 639-3: ehu
- Glottolog: ehue1238

Ehuẹun (Ekpimi) is an Edoid language of Ondo State, Nigeria. It is sometimes considered the same language as Ukue.

== Phonology ==
Ehuẹun has a rather reduced system, compared to proto-Edoid, of seven vowels; these form two harmonic sets, /i e a o u/ and /i ɛ a ɔ u/.

The language arguably has no phonemic nasal stops; [m, n] alternate with [β, l], depending on whether the following vowel is oral or nasal. The inventory is:

	Bilabial	Labiodental	Alveolar	Palatal	Velar	Labio-velar	Glottal
Plosive	b		t d		k ɡ	k͡p ɡ͡b	
Fricative	ɸ β [m]	f v	s z				h
Rhotic			r̝ r				
Approximant		ʋ	l [n]	j		w	

The two rhotics have been described as voiced and voiceless trills. However, Ladefoged found both to be approximants, with the pair being raised (without being fricatives) but not trills.
