= Iyayu language =

Edoid language of Ondo State, Nigeria

Iyayu
- Native to: Nigeria
- Native speakers: (25,000 cited 2000)
- Language family: Niger–Congo?: Atlantic–Congo; Volta–Niger; yeai; Edoid; Northwestern; Osse River; Iyayu

Language codes
- ISO 639-3: iya
- Glottolog: iyay1238

Iyayu is an Edoid language spoken in one of the six traditional quarters of Idoani town, known by the same name of Iyayu in Ondo State, Nigeria.
