= Okpe language (Southwestern Edo) =

Edoid language of Nigeria

Okpe
- Native to: Nigeria
- Region: Delta State
- Ethnicity: Urhobo
- Native speakers: (25,000 cited 2000)
- Language family: Niger–Congo?: Atlantic–Congo; Volta–Niger; yeai; Edoid; Southwestern; Okpe

Language codes
- ISO 639-3: oke – inclusive code Individual code: ids – Idesa
- Glottolog: okpe1250

Okpe is an Edoid language of Nigeria spoken by the Urhobo people.

== Phonology ==
The sound system is rather conservative, and nearly the same as that of Urhobo. The vowels system is the same, and somewhat reduced compared to proto-Edoid: there are seven vowels, /i e ɛ a ɔ o u/. Of the consonants, only significant differences are the addition of /ɣʷ/ and of the distinction between l vs n and y vs ny: these alternate, depending on whether the following vowel is oral or nasal. /ɾ, ʋ, w/ also have nasal allophones before nasal vowels.

	Labial	Labiodental	Alveolar	Palatal	Velar	Labio-velar	Glottal
Nasal	m		l [n]	j [ɲ]			
Plosive	p b		t d	c ɟ	k ɡ	k͡p ɡ͡b	
Fricative	ɸ	f v	s z	ɕ ʑ	ɣ	ɣʷ	h
Trill			r				
Flap			ɾ				
Approximant		ʋ	l [n]	j [ɲ]		w	
