= Kugu Nganhcara language =

Australian Aboriginal language

Kugu-Muminh
- Wik-Muminh
- Native to: Australia
- Region: Cape York Peninsula, Queensland
- Ethnicity: Kugu Nganhcara, Wik Iyanh
- Native speakers: 30 (2005)
- Language family: Pama–Nyungan: Paman; North Cape York; Wik; Kugu-Muminh
- Dialects: Muminh; Uwanh; Mu'inh; Ugbanh; Yi'anh; Iiyanh

Language codes
- ISO 639-3: Variously: xmh – Kuku-Muminh uwa – Kuku-Uwanh xmq – Kuku-Mangk? (unattested) xmp – Kuku-Mu’inh ugb – Kuku-Ugbanh wua – Kugu-Nganhcara wij – Wik-Iiyanh
- Glottolog: kuku1287 Kuku wikn1246 Wikngenchera wiki1239 Wik-Iiyanh
- AIATSIS: Y59
- ELP: Kugu-Nganhcara
- Wikngenchera is classified as Severely Endangered by the UNESCO Atlas of the World's Languages in Danger.
- Coordinates: 14°4′S 141°43′E

Kugu-Muminh (Wik-Muminh), also known as Kugu- or Wik-Nganhcara (Wikngenchera), is a Paman language spoken on the Cape York Peninsula of Queensland, Australia, by several of the Wik peoples. There are multiple dialects, only two of which are still spoken: Kugu-Muminh itself, and Kugu-Uwanh.

== Phonology ==
Consonant inventory
		Bilabial	Alveolar	Dental	Palatal	Velar	Glottal
Plosive	voiceless	p	t	t̪	c	k	ʔ
Plosive	voiced	b	d	d̪	ɟ	ɡ	
Nasal		m	n	n̪	ɲ	ŋ	
Lateral			l				
Tap			ɾ				
Glide		w			j		

Vowel inventory
	Front	Back
High	i iː	u uː
Mid	e eː	o oː
Low	a aː	
