= Edo language =

Edoid language spoken in Nigeria

Edo
- Bini
- Ẹ̀dó
- Native to: Nigeria
- Region: Edo State
- Ethnicity: Edo
- Native speakers: 2 million (2020)
- Language family: Niger–Congo?: Atlantic–Congo; Volta-Congo; Volta–Niger; Akpes-Edoid; Edoid; North-Central; Edo–Esan–Ora; Edo
- Writing system: Latin

Language codes
- ISO 639-2: bin
- ISO 639-3: bin
- Glottolog: bini1246
- Location of Edo speakers in Nigeria.

Edo (Ẹ̀dó [ɛ̀.dó]; English: /ˈɛdoʊ/, locally: /ˈedo/), also known as Bini, is the language spoken by the Edo people in Edo State, Nigeria. It was the primary language of the Benin Empire and its predecessor, Igodomigodo. It is the majority language spoken in the state, particularly in Benin City, and the surrounding local governments and senatorial districts in the southern parts of the state.

== Distribution ==
Most Edo speakers live in the southern parts of Edo State in Nigeria; the state was named for the Edo speakers. A smaller number of Edo speakers are also found in Delta State and Ondo State and in other parts of Nigeria.

Edo is an Edoid language. These languages are also spoken in Rivers State and Bayelsa State, Nigeria.

== Phonology ==
=== Vowels ===
There are seven vowels, /i e ɛ a ɔ o u/, all of which but /e o/ can also occur nasalised. Additionally, all vowels are phonetically nasalised in the immediate vicinity of a nasal consonant or vowel.

	Front		Central		Back	
	oral	nasal	oral	nasal	oral	nasal
Close	i	ĩ			u	ũ
Close-mid	e				o	
Open-mid	ɛ	ɛ̃			ɔ	ɔ̃
Open			a	ã		

=== Consonants ===
Edo has a rather average consonant inventory for an Edoid language. It maintains only a single phonemic nasal, /m/, but has 13 oral consonants, /r, l, ʋ, j, w/ and the 8 stops, which have nasal allophones such as [n, ɲ, ŋʷ], and nasalized allophones [ʋ̃, j̃, w̃] before nasal vowels.

	Labial	Labiodental	Alveolar	Palatal	Velar	Labio-velar	Glottal
Nasal	m						
Plosive	p b [pm bm]		t d [tn dn]		k ɡ [kŋ ɡŋ]	k͡p ɡ͡b [k͡pŋ͡m ɡ͡bŋ͡m]	
Fricative		f v	s z		x ɣ		ɦ
Trill			r				
Close approximant			ɹ̝̊ ɹ̝				
Open approximant		ʋ [ʋ̃]	l [n]	j [ɲ] [j̃]		w [ŋʷ] [w̃]	

The three rhotics have been described as voiced and voiceless trills as well as a lax English-type approximant. However, Ladefoged & Maddieson (1996) found all three to be approximants – with the voiced–voiceless pair being raised (albeit with very little frication) and perhaps at a slightly different place of articulation compared to the third – and none as trills.

=== Tone ===
There are three tones.

=== Phonotactics ===
Syllable structure is simple, being maximally CVV, where VV is either a long vowel or /i, u/ a different oral or nasal vowel.

== Orthography ==
The Edo alphabet has separate letters for the nasalised allophones of /ʋ/ and /l/, mw and n:

A	B	D	E	Ẹ	F	G	Gb	Gh	H	I	K	Kh	Kp	L	M	Mw	N	O	Ọ	P	R	Rh	Rr	S	T	U	V	Vb	W	Y	Z
/a/	/b/	/d/	/e/	/ɛ/	/f/	/ɡ/	/ɓˠ/	/ɣ/	/ɦ/	/i/	/k/	/x/	/kp/	/l/	/m/	[ʋ̃]	[n]	/o/	/ɔ/	/p/	/r/	/ɹ̝̊/	/ɹ̝/	/s/	/t/	/u/	/v/	/ʋ/	/w/	/j/	/z/

Long vowels are written by doubling the letter. Nasal vowels may be written with a final -n or with an initial nasal consonant. Tone may be written with acute accent, grave accent, and unmarked, or with a final -h (-nh with a nasal vowel).

== See also ==
- Edo people
- Edo literature
- Benin Empire

== Sources ==
- Adénéyì, Harrison 'Rótìmí (2007). A morphology of Edo (MA thesis). University of Ibadan. doi:10.5281/zenodo.3625750.
- Emovon, Joshua A. (1979). A phonological study of Edo (Bini), with special reference to the verbal phrase (MPhil thesis). SOAS, University of London. doi:10.25501/SOAS.00029261.
- Evbuomwan, Osaigbovo O. (2025), An Overview of Ẹdo Sounds and Some Phonological Conditions, University of Benin
