= Wagawaga language (New Guinea) =

Austronesian language spoken in Papua New Guinea

Wagawaga
- Region: Milne Bay Province, Papua New Guinea
- Native speakers: (1,900 cited 2000 census –2005)
- Language family: Austronesian: Malayo-Polynesian; Oceanic; Western; Papuan Tip; Nuclear; Suauic; Wagawaga

Language codes
- ISO 639-3: Either: ylb – Yaleba (Gamadoudou) wgb – Wagawaga (Baeaula)
- Glottolog: waga1262

Wagawaga is an Oceanic language spoken on the southeastern tip of Papua New Guinea. The Gamadoudou, Soma’a, and Sileba dialects may be a separate language, Yaleba.
