= Modern language =

Language in current use

A modern language (also known as a living language) is any human language that is currently in use as a native language.

The term is used in language education to distinguish between languages which are used for day-to-day communication (such as French and German) and dead classical languages such as Latin and Classical Chinese, which are studied for their cultural and linguistic value. For example, the Modern Language Association tracks student enrollments in Ancient Greek versus Modern Greek, or Biblical Hebrew versus Modern Hebrew, separately.

SIL Ethnologue defines a living language as "one that has at least one speaker for whom it is their first language" (see also Language § Linguistic diversity).

== Teaching ==
Practices in language education vary significantly by region. Firstly, the languages being learned differ; in the United States, Spanish is the most popular language to be learned, whereas the most popular languages to be learned in Australia are German, French, Italian and Mandarin Chinese. Also, teaching methods tend to differ by region. Language immersion is popular in some European countries, and not used very much in the United States.

Modern languages are taught extensively around the world; see second language acquisition. English is taught as a second or foreign language in many countries; see English language learning and teaching.

== Auxiliary languages ==
International auxiliary languages are by definition not associated with a particular country or geographic region. Esperanto is probably the best-known and most widespread. Interlingua, a much less popular, but still growing auxiliary language, is likewise spoken mainly in Northern and Eastern Europe and in South America, with substantial numbers of speakers in Central Europe, Ukraine, and Russia. Constructed languages from more recent years with sizable user communities are Klingon, Toki Pona and Interslavic.

== See also ==
- Modern Language Association
- Endangered language
- List of languages by total number of speakers
