= Isoko language =

Edoid language spoken in Nigeria

Isoko
- Region: Nigeria
- Ethnicity: Isoko
- Native speakers: 680,000 (2020)
- Language family: Niger–Congo?: Atlantic–Congo; Volta–Niger; yeai; Edoid; Southwestern; Isoko

Language codes
- ISO 639-3: iso
- Glottolog: isok1239

Isoko is an Edoid language, spoken by the Isoko people in the Isoko region of Delta State and Bayelsa. The Isoko language has several dialects, with its standard form traditionally associated with the Uzere and Aviara dialects.

Michael A. Marioghae, working with Peter Ladefoged in 1962, made one of a few audio recordings of sample Isoko words that are made available at the UCLA phonetics archive.

== Phonology ==
=== Consonants ===
Consonants
		Bilabial	Labiodental	Dental	Dental-Palatal	Alveolar	Palatal/Palato-alveolar	Velar	Labial–velar	Labiovelar	Glottal
Nasal		m		(n̪)	n̪ɲ	n	(ɲ)			ŋʷ	
Plosive	voiceless	p		t̪	(t̪c)	t	(c)	k	(kp)		
Plosive	voiced	b		d̪	(d̪ɟ)	d	(ɟ)	ɡ	ɡb	(ɡʷ)	
Implosive	voiceless	ƥ									
Implosive	voiced	ɓ									
Affricate	voiceless						(tʃ)				
Affricate	voiced						dʒ				
Fricative	voiceless	(ɸ)	f			s	ʃ	(x)		ʍ ~ hʷ	h
Fricative	voiced		v			z		ɣ		ɣʷ	
Fricative	breathy		v̤			(z̤)					ɦ
Approximant	central					ɹ	j			w	
Approximant	lateral					l					
Tap						ɾ					
Trill						r					

Consonants in parentheses occur in dialects other than Uzere.

According to Donwa-Ifode (1986), the following phonetic variations exist between dialects:

- [n̪] ~ [n̪ɲ] ~ [ɲ] ~ [hʲ] ~ [j]
- [ŋʷ] ~ [hʷ] ~ [ʍ]
- [t̪] ~ [t̪c] ~ [c]
- [d̪] ~ [d̪ɟ] ~ [ɟ] ~ [dʒ] ~ [ɡʲ] ~ [d]
- [ƥ] ~ [kp]
- [ɓ] ~ [ɡb]
- [tʃ] ~ [kʲ]
- [dʒ] ~ [ɡʲ] ~ [d]
- [ɾ] ~ [r] ~ [ɹ]
- [v] ~ [v̤] ~ [ɸ]
- [z] ~ [z̤] ~ [ɹ̝]
- [x] ~ [ɣ] ~ [ɡ]
- [xʷ] ~ [ɣʷ] ~ [ɡʷ]
- [ɦɾ] ~ [ɹ] ~ [l]
- [hʷ] ~ [ʍ]

=== Vowels ===
Vowels
	Front	Back
Close	i	u
Close-mid	e	o
Open-mid	ɛ ⟨ẹ⟩	ɔ ⟨ọ⟩
Open	a	

== Orthography ==
Isoko alphabet
A	B	D	E	Ẹ	F	G	H	I	J	K	L	M
N	O	Ọ	P	R	S	T	U	V	W	Y	Z	

Digraphs
CH	GB	GH	HW	KP	NW	NY	SH	TH	WH
