= Urhobo language =

Southwestern Edoid language of Nigeria

Urhobo
- Native to: Nigeria
- Region: Delta State, Edo State
- Ethnicity: Urhobo
- Native speakers: 1.1 million (2020)
- Language family: Niger–Congo?: Atlantic–Congo; Volta–Niger; yeai; Edoid; Southwestern; Urhobo

Language codes
- ISO 639-3: urh
- Glottolog: urho1239

Urhobo is a Southwestern Edoid language spoken by the Urhobo people of southern Nigeria. It is spoken in Delta and Bayelsa States.

== Phonology ==
Urhobo has a rather reduced system of sound inventory compared to proto-Edoid. The inventory of Urhobo consists of seven vowels; which form two harmonic sets, /i e ɛ a o ɔ u/ and /ĩ ẽ ɛ̃ ã ɔ̃ õ ũ/.

It has a conservative consonant inventory for an Edoid language. It maintains three nasals, and only five oral consonants, /ɾ, l, β̞, j, w/, have nasal allophones before nasal vowels.

	Labial	Labiodental	Alveolar	Post-alveolar	Palatal	Velar	Labio-velar
Nasal	m		(n)		ɲ		ŋ͡m
Plosive	p b		t d	d͡ʒ	kʲ ɡʲ	k ɡ	k͡p ɡ͡b
Fricative	ɸ	f v	s	ʃ	(ç ʝ)	x ɣ	
Trill			r̥ r				
Flap			(ɾ̥ ɾ)				
Lateral			l ~ n				
Approximant	β̞ [β̞̃]		(ɹ̥ ɹ) [ɹ̃]		j [j̃]	(ɰ ɰ̊)	w [w̃]

- /l/ is interchangeable with [n] only before nasal vowels.
- /d͡ʒ/ can be heard as [ɟ͡ʝ ~ ʝ] before non-front vowels.
- Nasal consonants /m, [n], ɲ, ŋ͡m/ can have allophones of nasalized approximants as [β̞̃], [ɹ̃ ~ ɾ̃], [j̃], [w̃].
- Approximants /β̞, j, w/ are heard as nasalized approximants [β̞̃, j̃, w̃] before and after nasal vowels.
- Velar fricatives /x, ɣ/ can vary from being heard as [x, ɣ] to lowered fricatives [x̞, ɣ̞] and approximants [ɰ̊, ɰ]. /x/ can also be heard as a palatal fricative [ç] before /i/.
- Rhotics /r̥, r/ may have different realizations as alveolar or retroflex, and can be articulated as approximants [ɹ̥, ɹ, ɻ̊, ɻ], or taps [ɾ̥, ɾ, ɽ̊, ɽ]. A retroflex lateral flap [ɭ̆] can also be heard in syllable-final position.

According to Anthony Ukere, Urhobo has two tones, a high tone and a low tone. These can also combine to form rising and falling tones. Rose Aziza is a professor of linguistics who does work on the phonology of Urhobo.

== Syntax ==
Urhobo has the subject–verb–object (SVO) constituent word order as illustrated with the example below:

Òtítí ò chó ọhọ ná
Otiti 3SG steal.PST hen DET
'Otiti stole the hen.'
