= Akoko North-West =

- LGA
- Nickname: ANWLG
- Interactive map of Akoko North-West
- Location within Nigeria
- Country: Nigeria
- State: Ondo State
- Headquarter: Okeagbe

Government
  - Executive Chairman: Hon John Abiodun Esan Owolabi

Area
  - Total: 512 km^{2} (198 sq mi)

Population (2006)
  - Total: 213,792
  - Density: 418/km^{2} (1,080/sq mi)
- Time zone: UTC+1 (WAT)
- Postal code: 342

Akoko North-West is a local government area in Ondo State, Nigeria. Its headquarters is in the town of Okeagbe.

It has an area of 512 km^{2} and a population of 213,792 at the 2006 census.

The postal code of the area is 342.

== Town and villages ==
Towns in the local government area include Iye, Ese, Okeagbe, Ikaram, Arigidi, Erusu, Ibaram, Iyani, Ase, Irun, Ogbagi, Ajowa, Afin, Oyin, Eriti, Igasi, Gedegede.

Iye Akoko is one of the villages in Akoko North West Local Government Area of Ondo State. Surrounded with some rocky hills, Iye Akoko comprises six quarters and six recognized high chiefs. It is located 25 km from Arigidi Akoko, with a population of ten thousand people as of the last census. The major works are teaching and farming. The Royal title of the community is "Oniye of Iye Akoko".

== Traditional rulers ==
Traditionally, the towns and villages have monarchs who rule over local municipalities. They are the Elese of Ese, the Ajana of Afa-Okeagbe, the Oluyani of Iyani, Akala of Ikaram, Zaki of Arigidi, Olu Ugbe of Ugbe Akoko, Osula of Erusu, Owa of Ogbagi, Olubaram of Ibaram, Oniye of Iye, Oludotun of Iludotun Ajowa, Olugedegede of Gedegede and Onirun of Irun, Alase of Ase, Oloyin of Oyin, Owage of Oge-Okeagbe, Oludo of Ido-Okeagbe, Ewi of Aje-Okeagbe, Olojo of Ojo Ajowa, Elesuku of Esuku Ajowa, Oludaja of Daja Ajowa, Olora of Ora Ajowa, Elefifa of Efifa Ajowa, Oluro of Uro Ajowa, Oloje of Igasi-Akoko, Alafin of Afin-Akoko. Eleriti of Eriti Akoko HRM Oba Amos Sunday Ogunleye (The Amomomekun II)

== List of Irun Akoko Kings ==
Order	Name of Kings	Order	Name of Kings	Order	Name of Kings	Order	Name of Kings
1st	Oba Olu Faworade	11th	Oba Ogbongbomudu	21st	Oba Okesebesibe	31st	Oba Fapohunda
2nd	Oba Owanla	12th	Oba Okeseribiti	22nd	Oba Akulojuorun	32nd	Oba Ukoro
3rd	Oba Elenla	13th	Oba Onamerinewu	23rd	Oba Ayarin	33rd	Oba Osoolu
4th	Oba Aganyan	14th	Oba Ogbagbalaya	24th	Oba Osoagba	34th	Oba Kabiowu
5th	Oba Esekoro	15th	Oba Afinibinde	25th	Oba Fagboke	35th	Oba Osodudu
6th	Oba Obose	16th	Oba Sisimoga	26	Oba Adelye	36th	Oba Falala
7th	Oba Aragbamugbamu	17th	Oba Aromimi	27th	Oba Falade	37th	Oba Bello Ajayi
8th	Oba Oluleka	18th	Oba Obele	28th	Oba Olupini	38th	Oba Williams Adewusi Akanle Okuta III
9th	Oba Adoja	19th	Oba Atobatele	29th	Oba Olofinji	39th	Oba Samuel Bayode Agboola Akulojuorun II (Current King) Crowned on 12/15/2021
10th	Oba Alamodi	20th	Oba Inabomodesere	30th	Oba Adoye		

== Languages ==
Languages of Akoko North–West LGA:

- Yoruba language
- Akoko language
- Akpes language (Àbèsàbèsì)
- Ayere-Ahan languages
  - Ahan language
  - Ayere language

== Economy ==
While trading also makes a significant contribution to the economy of Akoko Northwest, agriculture remains the region's primary economic activity. Marketplaces like the Ajowa and Ajuta markets serve as virtual marketplaces for the exchange of a wide range of goods and services.

== Climate ==
Akoko North-West lies within the tropical wet-and-dry climate zone of Ondo State. The LGA receives most of its rainfall between April and October, with July to September as the wettest period. The dry season is marked by warm temperatures and lower humidity.

== Notable people ==
- Prince Adetokunbo Kayode (SAN), Former Minister of Defense, Federal Republic of Nigeria
- T. B. Joshua, televangelist
- Chief Dr. J. O Sanusi, formal Central Bank of Nigeria governor
- Engineer Awe Gboyega, the CEO of Damatol group of companies
- The Owa of Ogbagi Akoko, HRM Oba Adetona Odagbaragaja
- Major General Henry Ayoola (RTD)
- Dr Olatunji Abayomi, Human Rights Activist and Constitutional Lawyer
- Reverend Gabriel Sunday Adeyemo, seasoned Baptist Pastor from Eriti Akoko based in Lagos
