= Idoma =

Idoma may refer to:

- Idoma people, Nigeria
  - Idoma language
