= Defoid languages =

Proposed branch of the Benue–Congo language family

Defoid
- (widely rejected)
- Geographic distribution: Nigeria, Benin and Togo
- Linguistic classification: Niger–Congo?: Atlantic–Congo; Volta–Congo; Benue-Congo; Defoid
- Proto-language: Proto-Defoid
- Subdivisions: Yoruboid; Akoko; Ayere-Ahan

Language codes
- Glottolog: defo1239

The Defoid languages are a proposed branch of the Benue–Congo language family. The name of the group derives from the fact that nearly all of the ethnic groups who speak member languages refer to the city of Ilé Ifè as their place of origin: "Defoid" comes from èdè ('language') + ifè (Ife) + -oid. It was first proposed by Capo (1989), but evidence for it is still regarded as insufficient by Güldemann (2018).

The Defoid language group consists of three branches, Yoruboid, Akoko and Ayere-Ahan. Currently, these three branches are considered part of the Volta-Niger languages and not Benue-Congo.
