= Eloyi =

Eloyi may refer to

- Eloyi Christian Church, an Apostolic church in Botswana
- Eloyi language, a poorly attested Plateau language of Nigeria
- Eloyi people, an ethnic group in Nigeria
