= Eloyi people =

Eloyi
Total population
- 100,000

Regions with significant populations
- Nigeria: 100,000

Languages
- Eloyi language, Hausa language

Religion
- Traditional, Muslim, Christian

The Eloyi (also called Afao, Afo, Afu, Aho, Epe, Keffi) are an ethnic group of central Nigeria. About 100,000 people identify themselves as Eloyi. They are related to the Idoma ethnic group.

== Geography & Language ==
The Eloyi (Ajiri) people are mostly found in Awe, Nasarawa, Kokona Government Areas (LGAs) of Nasarawa State and the Otukpo LGA of Benue State.

As of 2000 it was reported that there were 60,000 people who speak the Eloyi language. Ajiri is an Idomoid branch of the Benue-Congo group. Although in modern times Many native speakers have adopted Hausa as their second or primary language.

== History ==
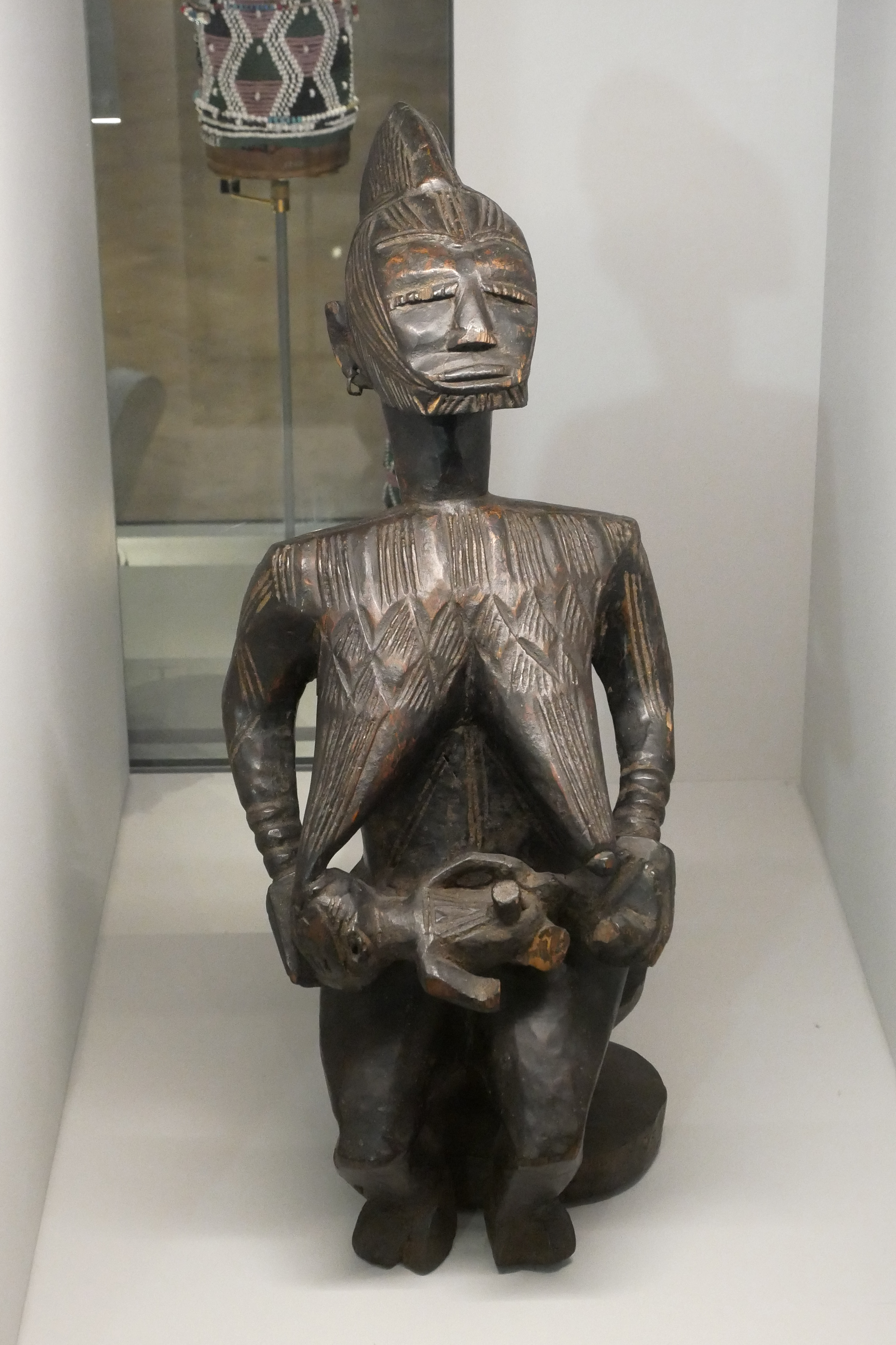
An Eloyi maternity figurine made in 1875, on display in the Horniman Museum, London

Traditionally, most of the Eloyi lived in a 15 miles (24 km) range of rocky hills in what today is Nasarawa State. Formerly known as Afo, the Eloyi are ethnically related to the Idoma Ethnic group. Additionally, they revolted against the British in 1918, and were then forced to leave their homeland. Today they are scattered in different parts of Nasarawa and Benue states, although some have moved back to the original hills. The British divided the Eloyi into ten village areas in 1932, appointing a head for each village, but these village heads were not recognized by the Eloyi.

== Society ==
The Eloyi are one of the more economically advanced of the Benue Valley tribes. In the hills they grow guinea corn, cotton, yams, and tobacco. They practice in weaving and dying, producing cloth that is much in demand and can be traded. They are also blessed with one of the biggest Natural resources (Solid Mineral) deposit in Nasarawa State. The Eloyi villages in the hills are made up of round huts with conical thatched roofs grouped around a central courtyard, and are independent, each with a chief as a leader, advised by a council of elders. In the plains the Eloyi are mostly farmers, selling dried fish and palm oil for cash. The plains Eloyi build large houses within compounds and fortify their villages.

== Organization and beliefs ==
The village is the largest political, as well as social unit, independent of its neighbors. A chief is assisted by a council of elders in administering the village and resolving disputes. The gado is the father or the leader figure of the village, the authority on customs and law, in charge of planting and harvest rites. Most Eloyi practice their traditional beliefs, which center on the god Owo, who is symbolized by a white silk cotton tree or a fig tree. The Eloyi worship their ancestors, whose spirits are thought to live on and to require food and care. Religious rites include masked impersonation of ancestors, witchcraft, magic, and divination with strings. A considerable number of the Eloyi have adopted islam as their religion.
