= Akpes =

Akpes may be,

- Akpes language
- Gina Akpe-Moses
