= EKR =

EKR may refer to:

== People ==
- E.K.R. (rapper) (born 1970), Swiss rapper
- Edward Kennard Rand (1871–1945), American medievalist
- Elisabeth Kübler-Ross (1926–2004), Swiss-American psychiatrist
- Enrique K. Razon (born 1960), Filipino businessman

== Places ==
- East Kazakhstan Region, Kazakhstan
- Ekangarsarai station, Bihar, India

== Other uses ==
- EKR (missile), a 1950s Soviet weapon prototype
- Erdős–Ko–Rado theorem, in mathematics
- Yace language, spoken in Nigeria (ISO 639:ekr)
