= Yace language =

Idomoid language spoken in southeast Nigeria

Yace
- Yache
- Native to: Southeast Nigeria
- Region: Cross River State
- Native speakers: 50,000 (2002)
- Language family: Niger–Congo?: Atlantic–Congo; Volta–Niger; noi; Idomoid; Yace

Language codes
- ISO 639-3: ekr
- Glottolog: yace1238

Yace (Yache) is an Idomoid language of Cross River State, Nigeria. It is spoken in Yala LGA, Alifokpa, Imbuo, Maa, Osina, Uchu, and Wonye. Yace is closely related to the Akpa language.
