= Oko language =

Niger–Congo dialect cluster spoken in Nigeria

Oko
- Ogori-Magongo
- ɔ̀kɔ́
- Native to: Nigeria
- Region: Kogi State
- Native speakers: 40,000 (2006)
- Language family: Niger–Congo?: Atlantic–Congo; Volta–Niger; noi; Oko
- Dialects: Oko; Eni; Osayen

Language codes
- ISO 639-3: oks
- Glottolog: okoe1238

Oko (ɔ̀kɔ́), also known as Ogori-Magongo and Oko-Eni-Osayin, is a dialect cluster spoken in Nigeria. It appears to form a branch of the "Nupe–Oko–Idoma" (noi) group of Niger–Congo languages. The language is spoken in and around the towns of Ogori and Magongo in southwestern Kogi State and Edo state borders.

== Classification ==
Oko is one of the Volta–Niger languages.

An automated computational analysis (ASJP 4) by Müller et al. (2013) grouped Oko within the Idomoid languages.

== Geographical distribution ==
According to Ethnologue, Oko is spoken in:

- Edo State: Akoko-Edo LGA
- Kogi State: Okene LGA, Magongo, and Ogori towns

== Varieties ==
Oko is a dialect cluster consisting of (Ethnologue):

- Oko (Ogori, Uku)
- Osayin (Magongo, Osanyin)
- Eni

Below is a list of Ọkọ–Eni–Ọsayin language cluster names, populations, and locations from Blench (2019).

Language	Alternate spellings	Other names (location-based)	Speakers
Ọkọ	Uku, Oko	Ogori (town name), Gori	4,000 (1970??)
Ọsayin	Osayin, Ọsayin	Magongo (town name)	3,000 (1970??)
Eni			3,000 (1970??)

== Orthography ==
Oko is a language without a working orthography. Although some educated members of the Oko speaking communities have at one time or the other proposed an orthography for the language, for example, Akerejola (1971) and Adegbija (1993), none of their proposals have been duly given much recognition due to lack of literacy in the language.

== Phonology ==
=== Consonants ===
		Labial	Alveolar	Palatal	Velar	Labio- velar	Glottal
Nasal		m	n				
Plosive	Voiceless	p	t		k	k͡p	
Plosive	Voiced	b	d		g	ɡ͡b	
Affricate	Voiceless			t͡ʃ			
Affricate	Voiced			d͡ʒ			
Fricative	Voiceless	f	s				h
Fricative	Voiced		z				
Trill			r				
Approximant			l	j		w	

=== Vowels ===
	Front	Central	Back
Close	i		u
Close-mid	e		o
Open-mid	ɛ		ɔ
Low		ä	

Each vowel also has a nasal equivalent.

== See also ==
- Oko word list (Wiktionary)
