= Agatu language =

Idomoid language of Nigeria

Agatu
- North Idoma
- Native to: Nigeria
- Region: Benue State, Nassarawa State
- Native speakers: (70,000 cited 1987)
- Language family: Niger–Congo?: Atlantic–Congo; Volta–Niger; noi; Idomoid; Etulo–Idoma; Idoma; Agatu

Language codes
- ISO 639-3: agc
- Glottolog: agat1236

Agatu, or North Idoma, is an Idomoid language of Nigeria. It is considered a dialect of Idoma.
