= Idoma language =

Idomoid language of southeast-central Nigeria

Idoma
- Ìdɔ́mà
- Region: Benue State, Central Nigeria
- Ethnicity: Idoma
- Native speakers: 980,000 (2020)
- Language family: Niger–Congo?: Atlantic–Congo; Volta-Congo; Volta–Niger; noi; Idomoid; Etulo–Idoma; Idoma

Language codes
- ISO 639-3: idu
- Glottolog: idom1241
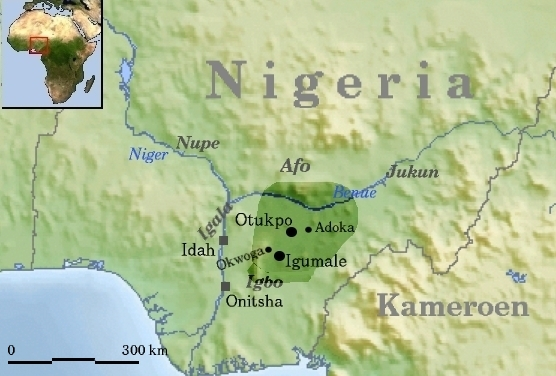

Idoma (Ìdɔ́mà) is the second official language spoken in Benue State in southeast-central Nigeria, by approximately one million people (2020 estimate). The Idoma language is made up of the dialects of Agatu, Edumoga, Otukpo, Otukpa, Orokam, Akpa Agila, Utonkon, Igede, Etilo, Iyala. The Idoma people are predominantly hunters, farmers and fishermen. They are bordered to the north by Nasarawa, south by Cross River, east by Taraba and west by Enugu and Kogi States.

== Animal names ==
English	Idoma
dog	ewo
Tiger	eje
lion	agaba
elephant	adagba
squirrel	ocha
ground squirrel	okwleje
antelope	awi
gorilla	obagwu
cow	ena
scorpion	ena; akpe
goat	ewu
male-goat	opi
horse	onya
sheep	ala; adangba
ram	omede
hawk	uche
kite	omaga
eagle	okpe
snake	egwa
boa (snake)	idu
python (snake)	idili
lizard	apa
mamba (snake)	aka
cobra (snake)	owa
mole (snake)	ekwu
viper (snake)	ogwiji
crocodile	ikwu
partridge	ewa
monkey	eka
parrot	iga
rooster	obugwu
mice	iyumbe
rat	ifu; ikrekwu
chimpanzee	ehlo
bat	ido; udo
sparrow	egwe
finch	aylo
vulture	epu; efu
bald eagle	acha
tortoise	ikinabo; okpakwu
butterfly	ibebe
chameleon	anyinya
woodpecker	otochikpokpo
crab	akle
toad	aklifu
dog	ewo
dove	okede; okarikede
pigeon	okantebe
owl	ogwugwu
deer	ewi
falcon	uch’okpafa
giraffe	ocha
koala	akango
penguin	igwe
onyx	enoba
zebra	otina
beetle	ogbemi
swift	akpandede
praying mantis	ogongo
grasshopper	ikaka
cricket	ata
grasscutter	obije
ant	ilu
soldier ant	egayinu
mosquito	imu
fish	ebenyi
catfish	edu
tilapia	apatampa
pig	ehi; okome
cat	obla; obisi
duck	idangblo
ferret	otekeneje
ringneck dove	otitii
cockroach	akpanga; apupre
electric fish	olili
agama lizard	obolokpo
red-headed lizard	oroburu
wasp	amulupka
bee	enwu
hedgehog	egbe
snail	igbi
