= Ajowa Akoko =

Community in Ondo State

Ajowa-Akoko Ajowa
- Town
- Location in Nigeria
- Coordinates: 7.684819°N 5.907643°E
- Country: Nigeria
- State: Ondo State
- Local Government Area: Akoko North West
- Established: 1955

Government
  - Chairman, Council of Obas: The Elefifa of Efifa Oba Benson Ayodele Adebiy

Population
  - Total: 12,119
- Time zone: UTC+1 (WAT)

Ajowa-Akoko is a town located in Akoko North West Local Government Area of Ondo State, Nigeria. It is known for its governance structure involving eight autonomous kings and is considered a boundary town between Ondo and Kogi States. The town has been in peaceful coexistence considering its setup, was officially established in 1955. Ajowa has a rich cultural heritage and significant educational institutions.

== History ==
Ajowa-Akoko originated as an amalgamation of eight independent communities: Uro, Efifa, Ora, Ojo, Iludotun, Oso, Daja, and Esuku. The union was facilitated by P. A. R. A. Olusa, a regional representative at the Ibadan Conference in 1954, to unify smaller villages for enhanced development and representation before the then Western Region government.

The town's name, "Ajowa", translates to "We Come Together" in Yoruba, reflecting the consensus-driven establishment. Despite their unity, each community retains its traditional ruler, cultural practices, dialect and original land holdings.

== Governance ==
Ajowa-Akoko operates a confederal system, where the eight communities are ruled by their respective kings:

- The Oluro of Uro
- The Elefifa of Efifa
- The Olora of Ora
- The Olojo of Ojo
- The Oludotun of Iludotun
- The Olu of Daja
- The Olukotun of Oso
- The Elesuku of Esuku

The kings govern their individual domains autonomously while collaborating on issues affecting the entire town.

== Educational institutions ==
Ajowa-Akoko is home to numerous educational institutions, including the FESTMED College of Education, Ajowa-Akoko, which offers various programs in education. Public and private primary and secondary schools serve the town's population.

== Prominent residents ==
Ajowa-Akoko has produced notable individuals, including:

- Military officers, such as two retired Major-Generals (as of 2014)
- Academics, including professors at Obafemi Awolowo University, University of Ibadan, and the University of Missouri University of Missouri
- Politicians, such as Hon. Adeyinka Banso, a former member of the Ondo State House of Assembly.
- The Olusa Family, the most prominent family and ruling house of Iludotun and Ora

== Challenges ==
The town has faced security challenges, including incidents of kidnapping along major roads and within the community. For example, in 2022, a monarch from Oso-Ajowa was abducted and later released after a ransom was reportedly paid. Efforts are ongoing to improve safety in the area.

== Culture and unity ==
Despite challenges, Ajowa-Akoko residents celebrate their diverse traditions while fostering a spirit of peace, love, and progress. The young people are united by organizations such as National Union of Ajowa Students (NUAS), Ajowa Progressive Youth Network (APYN). The kings are in a council of Obas headed currently by The Elefifa of Efifa Oba Benson Ayodele Adebiyi, Preceded by Oba Kayode Olusa of Iludotun
