= Akpes language =

Endangered language of Nigeria

Akpes
- Abesabesi
- Pronunciation: [àbèsàbès]
- Native to: Nigeria
- Region: Ondo State
- Native speakers: 7,000 (2021)
- Language family: Niger–Congo?: Atlantic–Congo; Volta–Congo; Volta–Niger; yeai; Akpes–Edoid; Akpes

Language codes
- ISO 639-3: ibe
- Glottolog: akpe1248
- ELP: Ikorom
- Coordinates: 7.632653°N 5.877947°E

Akpes (Àbèsàbèsì) is an endangered language of Nigeria. It is spoken by approximately 7,000 speakers in the North of Ondo State. The language is surrounded by several other languages of the Akoko area, where Yoruba is the lingua franca. Yoruba replaces Akpes in more and more informal domains and thus forwards a gradual shift from Akpes towards Yoruba. Akpes is generally attributed to the Volta-Congo Branch of the Niger-Congo phylum.

== Name ==
The language is commonly referred to as 'Akpes' in literature. As this term is in fact the name of one of the four dialects, it is not supported by the whole speaker community. A meeting of representatives of all nine settlements has coined the term 'Abesabesi' to denote the language. It is a reduplication of the word àbès meaning 'we'.

== Distribution and varieties ==
Abesabesi is spoken in nine different settlements in the Akoko North-East and Akoko North-West LGAs of Ondo State. While Àkùnnù, Àsẹ̀, Gèdègédé, Ìbáràmù, Ìkáràmù, and Ìyànì are independent towns, three settlements form a quarter of the multilingual town Àjọwá: Dája, Ẹ̀ṣùkù, Ìlúdọ̀tun (also: Ìlọ̀dùn or Àkùnnù Àjọwá). The quarter Efifa of Ajowa used to speak Akpes in the past but switched to the local Yoruba variety Owe. Agoyi (2009) classifies the varieties of these nine settlements into four dialects: Akpes, Èkiròmì, Èṣùkù, Ìluẹnì. Her analysis is mostly based on differences in lexicon and phonemics (especially vowel harmony). All dialects are mutually intelligible. Below is a table of all dialects, the settlements they are spoken in, and alternate names.

Dialect	Settlement	Location	Coordinates	Alternate names
Akpes	Àkùnnù	Akoko North-East LGA	7.629756°N 5.937402°E	
Akpes	Ìlúdọ̀tun	Quarter of Àjọwá, Akoko North-West LGA	7.674049°N 5.898399°E	Ìlọ̀dùn, Àkùnnù Àjọwá
Èkiròmì	Asẹ	Akoko North-West LGA	7.60222°N 5.884055°E	
Èkiròmì	Ìkáràmù	Akoko North-West LGA	7.610636°N 5.863632°E	Ikaram, Ikeram, Ikorom
Èṣùkù	Dája	Quarter of Àjọwá, Akoko North-West LGA	7.677871°N 5.899412°E	
Èṣùkù	Ẹ̀ṣùkù	Quarter of Àjọwá, Akoko North-West LGA	7.673737°N 5.896295°E	Echuku
Ìluẹnì	Gèdègédé	Akoko North-West LGA	7.632653°N 5.877947°E	
Ìluẹnì	Ìbáràmù	Akoko North-West LGA	7.599074°N 5.846479°E	Ibaram
Ìluẹnì	Ìyànì	Akoko North-West LGA	7.600432°N 5.849476°E	

== Genetic affiliation ==
While most scholars attribute Abesabesi somewhere in the Volta–Niger branch of Niger–Congo, its exact position within this branch is disputed. Some claimed that it forms a separate sub-branch and others claimed a closer relationship to the Edoid languages or Ukaan.

The ASJP 4.0 classifies Abesabesi as most closely related to the Ukaan language.

== Phonology ==
Abesabesi has a rich phoneme inventory comprising labial-velar and labialized consonants and an advanced tongue root (ATR) distinction for the oral mid vowels. The orthography used here follows Lau (2020), which is based on IPA. Abesabesi is a tonal language with a high, a mid, and a low tone. These tones are symbolized through an acute accent, no accent, or grave accent on the tone-bearing unit. All three tones are lexical tones. However, the high tone only rarely appears on base lexemes but is often used as grammatical tone marking the mood of a clause, possession, location, or relativization. Frequent phonological processes in Abesabesi include vowel deletion, assimilation, and vowel harmony. A syllable can have the structure N (syllabic nasal) or (C)V(V)(C). Closed syllables only appear at the end of a word and are likely to have resulted from word final vowel deletion.

=== Vowels ===
Abesabesi exhibits seven oral and five nasal vowels. While an ATR distinction exists for the oral mid vowels (/o/ vs. /ɔ/ and /e/ vs. /ɛ/), nasal vowels do not differentiate +ATR from -ATR (/ɔ̃/ and /ɛ̃/).

Oral vowels
	Front	Central	Back
Close	i		u
Mid	e ɛ		o ɔ
Open		a	

Nasal vowels
	Front	Central	Back
Close	ĩ		ũ
Mid	ɛ̃		ɔ̃
Open		ã	

=== Consonants ===
Abesabesi's consonant inventory consists of 29 consonants. While 20 of these consonants are frequently used in lexemes, nine only appear marginally (indicated in parentheses). Many of these marginal consonants are labialized equivalents of stops, nasals, and fricatives, such as /bʷ/, /mʷ/, and /hʷ/. Agoyi treats these consonants as a result of deleted rounded vowels. The phoneme /ʃ/ can be realized as [ʃ] or as the affricate [t͜ʃ].

	Labial	Alveolar	Postalveolar	Palatal	Velar	Labial-velar	Glottal
Plosive	(p) b (bʷ)	t d			k (kʷ) ɡ	k͜p ɡ͜b	
Nasal	m (mʷ)	n		ɲ	ŋ		
Fricative	f (fʷ)	s (sʷ)	ʃ (ʃʷ)				h (hʷ)
Affricate			d͜ʒ				
Lateral		l					
Approximant		r		j (j̃)		w	

== See also ==
- Akpes word lists (Wiktionary)
