= Akpa language =

Idomoid language of central Nigeria

Akpa
- Akweya
- Native to: Central Nigeria
- Region: Benue State
- Native speakers: (30,000 cited 2000)
- Language family: Niger–Congo?: Atlantic–Congo; Volta–Niger; noi; Idomoid; Akpa

Language codes
- ISO 639-3: akf
- Glottolog: akpa1238

Akpa (Akweya) is an Idomoid language spoken in Ohimini and Oturkpo LGAs, Benue State, central Nigeria.
