= Alago language =

Idomoid language of Nigeria

Alago
- Idoma Noku
- Native to: Nigeria
- Region: Nassarawa State
- Native speakers: (350,000 cited 2000)
- Language family: Niger–Congo?: Atlantic–Congo; Volta–Niger; noi; Idomoid; Etulo–Idoma; Idoma; Alago
- Dialects: Doma, Keana, Obi

Language codes
- ISO 639-3: ala
- Glottolog: alag1242
- ELP: Alago

Alago, or Idoma Nokwu, is an Idomoid language spoken by the Sub-Saharan peoples of Nigeria. The Alago people were originally one with the Idoma people of modern-day Benue state in Nigeria. However, the Alago people are believed to have broken up with their Idoma counterpart around 1200 AD.

Alago people are an agrarian group who grow most of the food they eat. These include egusi, yam, guinea corn, maize, and millet grain. Popular meals eaten by the alago include ona-g'ishi (pounded yam) and ona-g'iye which are eaten with soups like Owo'oho and Okeshe.

Alago people are known for religious freedom, as it is common to find single families with a mix of Christians, Muslims, and traditional religion practitioners. However, the practice of the latter is quickly disappearing among younger generations.

There are several dialects of the language, with the main one being Keana. Additional dialects consist of the variation that might be spoken in these Alago settlements:

- Agbo-ko-tashi (Agwatashi)
- Akpanaja
- Aloshi
- Ana
- Assaikio (owusakio)
- Doma
- Igbabo
- Olonya
- Idadu
- Ibi
- Obi
- Agaza
- Owena
- Odobu
- Agbashi and others
