= Kwa =

Kwa or KWA may refer to:

== Languages ==
- Kwah language, spoken in Nigeria
- Kwa' language, spoken in Cameroon
- Volta–Niger languages, a Niger–Congo subsubfamily also known as Kwa or "East Kwa"
- Kwa languages (or New Kwa), a disputed Niger–Congo subfamily
- Dâw language, spoken in Brazil (ISO 639-3:kwa)

== Organisations ==
- Karegnondi Water Authority, Michigan, US
- Khmer Writers' Association, Cambodia

== People ==
- Kwa Geok Choo, Singaporean lawyer
- Kwah, Canadian Dakelh leader

== Places ==
- Kwah River, Congo
- Great Kwa River, Nigeria
- Bucholz Army Airfield, Marshall Islands, (IATA code:KWA)
