= Okoho =

Nigerian soup

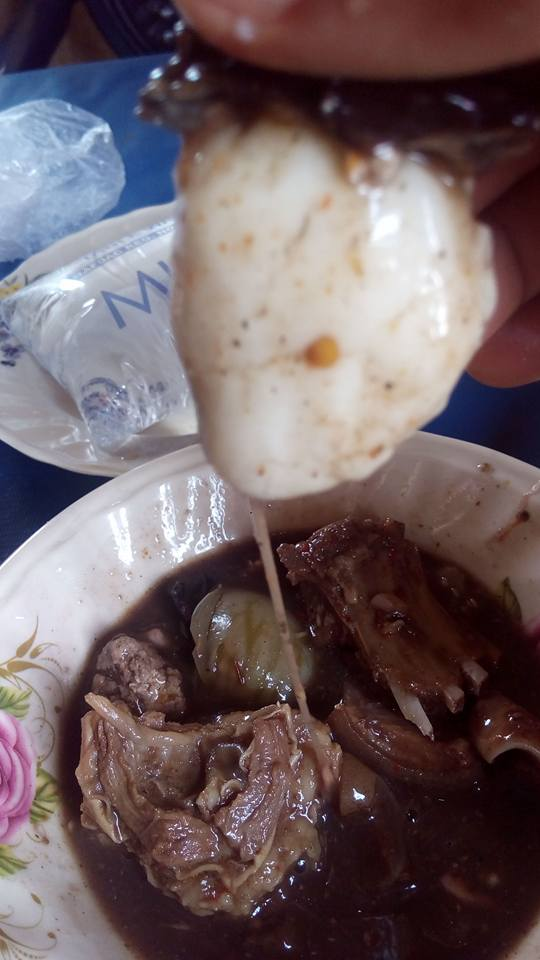
Picture of Okoho soup (prepared with goat meat and garden eggs) being eaten by an Idoma man from Benue State, Nigeria

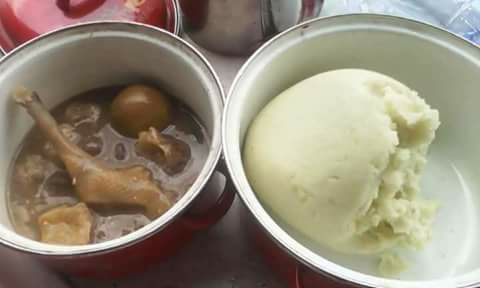
Picture of Okoho soup with pounded yam (Onihi)

Okoho is the main traditional food peculiar to the Idoma people of Benue State, Central Nigeria. It is made from the plant Cissus populnea belonging to the family Amplidaceae (Vitaceae).

It is a soup made from the Okoho stick which is very slimy after preparation. It is usually prepared with bush meat (such as grass-cutter, alligator and smoked meat etc.) and best served with pounded yam (a.k.a. Onihi). It can also be eaten with semolina, eba (made from garri) and yam flour. This soup is usually prepared without the use of oil. It is the most respected and demanded food in all Idoma events such as; traditional weddings, burial ceremonies, birthdays and other festivities. Okoho soup is highly medicinal and also known for its ability to aid digestion. Other Nigerian tribes such as Igbos and Igalas also refer to it as Okoho, while the stick is known as Ajara or Orogbolo by the Yoruba tribes of northern and southern Nigeria. The Hausas usually call it Dafara.
