= Idoma people =

Ethnic group in Nigeria

Idoma
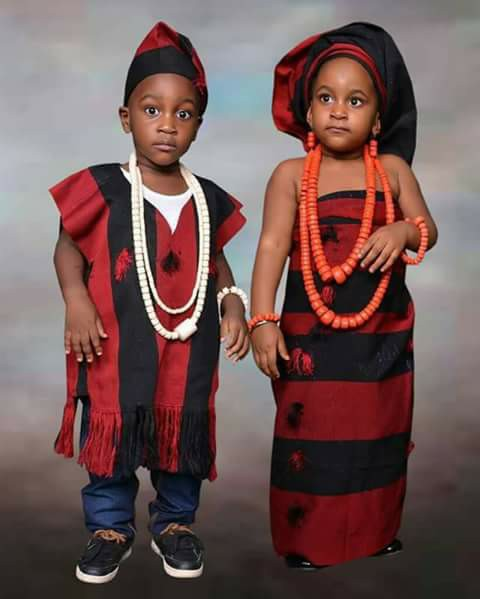
- Idoma children dressed in Idoma traditional attire

Total population
- 3.7 million

Regions with significant populations
- Benue State (Nigeria)

Languages
- Idoma

Religion
- Christianity, Traditional beliefs

The Idoma people are a West African ethnic group that primarily inhabit the lower western areas of Benue State, Nigeria. The bulk of their territory is inland, south of the Benue River, some seventy-two kilometers east of its confluence with the Niger River. The Idoma language is classified in the Akweya subgroup of the Idomoid languages of the Volta–Niger family, which include Igede, Alago, Agatu, Etulo, Ete, Akweya (Akpa) and Yala languages of Benue, Nasarawa, Kogi, Enugu, and Northern Cross River states. The Akweya subgroup is closely related to the Yatye-Akpa subgroup.

The Idoma tribe are known to be "warriors" and "hunters" of high class, yet they are also hospitable and peace loving. The greater part of Idoma land remained largely unknown to the West until the 1920s, leaving much of the colorful traditional culture of the Idoma intact. They have many forms of local crafts, masquerades, performances, religious traditions, and food traditions. Each Idoma community has their own government of elders, including the igabo and the Oche. All twenty-two Idoma communities together are administered by the Och'Idoma, who was introduced by British colonization and is the head of the Idoma Area Traditional Council.

== Location ==
Map of Nigeria with its ethno-linguistic groups, including Idoma.

The Idoma are located in the southern part of Middle-Belt/North Central Nigeria, specifically the broad valley of the Benue and Cross-River basins. This includes the lower western areas of Benue State, Nigeria. According to the 2006 population census, of the 4,253,641 people in Benue State, 1,307,647 were Idoma people. Their territory consists of an area of about 7,500 square kilometres (2,900 sq mi) (280 kilometres [170 mi] from north to south, 48 kilometres [30 mi] from east to west) and is within the latitude of 600 and 300 north and longitude 800 east. Some Idoma people can also be found in Taraba State, Cross River State, Enugu State, Kogi State and Nasarawa State in Nigeria.

The Idoma are surrounded by three main types of environments: flood plains, gentle rolling hills, and flat-topped and steep-sided ridges. Located south of the Benue River, there are many large stream and rivers. These waterways have seasonal flows that are often strong and will overflow during rainy season (August to October). Natural vegetation includes savannahs (like open grasslands) and/or orchard bushes. Locust beans, shear butter trees, iroko, mahogany, obese, date palms, and rubber trees can be found in the savannah areas.

== Origin ==
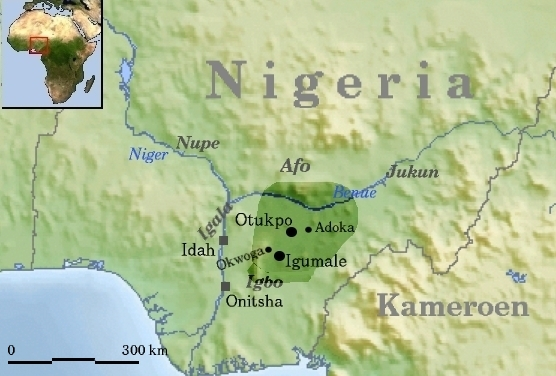
Idoma territory in Nigeria

=== Traditional history of Idoma people ===
Origin:

The history of the Idoma people precedes the history of Benue State (created 1976) and the history of the Republic of Nigeria (created 1960). Oral tradition and dance is the primary method through which history has been passed in Idomaland and is considered a central cultural institution. From a young age, Idoma children usually learn from their elders stories of old and were brought up around extended families, which make multiple historical resources available. When prompted, Idomas generally will proudly say where they are from, and it's not uncommon for Idoma to be able to recite at least four generations of their progenitors. Historically, being unable to answer the emblematic question "Who is your father?" disqualified one from important roles and titles in Idomaland. Quite naturally, a number of villages trace origins to single ancestors and further, several Idoma groups trace their heritage to one common ancestor, considered the "father" of the different groups. According to traditional history, Iduh, the father of the Idoma had several children who each established different areas. Hence the expression: "Iduh the father of Idoma." "Iduh the father of Idoma Iduh who begot all the Idoma He also begot the following children: Ananawoogeno who begot the children of Igwumale; Olinaogwu who begot the people of Ugboju; Idum who begot the people of Adoka; Agabi who begot the people of Otukpo; Eje who begot the people of Oglewu; Ebeibi who begot the people of Umogidi in Adoka, Edeh who begot the people of Edumoga and Ode who begot the people of Yala." While there may be some truth to the above, the Idoma cannot be said to have a unitary origin. Many Idoma groups and village subsets have their own histories complete with stories about how their people arrived at their current location. The Otukpa people descended from three ancestors: Owuno, Ameh-Ochagbaha and Oodo. The first two were brothers who migrated from Idah in Igalaland while Oodo migrated from Igboland. As one can imagine, the ever-changing movement of people through time makes it difficult to study Idoma history. There are some Idomas who are originally Igbos and heavily intermarried with the northern fringes of Igboland.

=== Scholarly history ===
Scholars have combined oral history with genealogical data and analysis of kinship totems to trace the roots of the Idoma people as a whole. One notable Idoma scholar, E.O. Erim, cites genealogical data, collected from most modern groups in Idoma suggesting that they derive from several ethnic groups, each with a different historical origin. Furthermore, the available genealogies indicate the existence of diverse ethnic groups who descended from ancestors other than Idu. In several of these cases, the claim of common descent is backed by both extensive genealogical connections and possession of common kinship totems. Erim contends that while Idu was certainly a migration leader—he was not the "father" of the Idoma in the sense implied in the above traditions. These two considerations make it difficult to simply accept the view that every group in Idomaland is descended from Idu.

Many Idoma kindred claims an ancestral homeland called Apa, north-east of present-day Idomaland due to pressures of Northern invaders as recently as 300 years ago. The historical Apa was part of the ancient Kwararafa Kingdom (Okolofa Kingdom), a confederacy of several peoples. Informants in other ethnic groups have corroborated the existence of this kingdom, chiefly the Jukun who also believe they once ruled a confederacy called Kwararafa. In the Hausa book Kano Chronicle it is mentioned that Zaria, under Queen Amina conquered all towns as far as Kwararafa in the 15th century. At present, there is a Local Government Area in Benue State called Apa and is said to be the home of those who made the first migration from the historical kingdom. For many Idoma nationalists today, the name Apa elicits sentiments of past glory, and some in the political sphere have gone as far as suggesting it should become the name of a new Idoma state.

Other scholars point to historical and linguistic evidence that suggests that Idoma have ties with the Igala people to the west, concluding that the two nations came from a common ancestor. Angulu (1981) note that Igala and Igbo have important historical, ancestral and cultural relationships. Eri is said to be the original legendary cultural head of the Umu-Eri , a subgroup of the Igbo people. Eri established a community in the middle of Anambra river valley (at Eri-aka) in Aguleri where he married two wives. The first wife, Nneamakụ, bore him five children. The first was Agulu, the founder of Aguleri (The ancestral head of Eri Kingdom clans) (the Ezeora dynasty that has produced 34 kings till date in Enugwu Aguleri), the second was Menri, the founder of Umunri/Kingdom of Nri, followed by Onugu, the founder of Igbariam and Ogbodulu, the founder of Amanuke. The fifth one was a daughter called Iguedo, who is said to have borne the founders of Nteje, and Awkuzu, Ogbunike, Umuleri, Nando and Ogboli in Onitsha. As one of the children of Eri, Menri migrated from Aguleri, which was and still is, the ancestral temple of the entire Umu-Eri (Umu-Eri). His second wife Oboli begot Ọnọja, the only son who founded the Igala Kingdom in Kogi State. Among this group, there are those who believe both ethnic groups fled the same kingdom at some point in history. Many traditional Idoma spiritual chants and "secret" tongues spoken during traditional ceremonies are actually Igbo and Igala dialects and there are some Idoma themselves who assert their Igbo and Igala ancestry. There are yet other Idoma groups notably in the southern regions, which claim their ancestors arrived at their present location from the northern fringes of Igboland as a result of land disputes. Scholars believe these people had most likely fled Apa too, settled and resettled.

As suggested, a number of factors make it difficult to study Idoma historical origins of the Idoma people as a whole. In any event, it could be said that despite their heterogeneous origins, trading, marriage, language and other interactions among the Idoma have cultivated traditions and shaped a rich cultural identity distinctly their own.

== Outside of Benue ==
The popular idea is that the Idoma are an ethnolinguistic group primarily found in the western areas of Benue State, Nigeria. This is because they are the second largest group in the state and occupy nine local government areas (L.G.A.'s) which are: Ado, Agatu, Apa, Obi, Ohimini, Ogbadibo, Oju, Okpokwu and Otukpo. Aside from the western parts of Benue, this tribe has settlements in other parts of the country, including Taraba, Nassarawa, Kogi, Enugu and the Cross River States.

== Local craft ==
Idoma society has many forms of local craft and industries. These include iron smelting, blacksmithing, cloth weaving and dyeing, pottery, basket weaving, brewing of Burukutu (the local beer) and Enyi (the local soft drink), and wood carving. The richness and variety of crafts is due to the several raw materials available to the Idoma. Besides making these products for themselves, the Idoma groups also exchange their goods with one another at markets spread through Idomaland.

Patrons of Idoma art often include the king and his court, shrine priests, and the heads of masquerade and dance societies. The Idoma do not get much non-Idoma patronage as they have minimum contact with tourist, especially given their scattered villages that are often far from roads. The Idoma also don't have any carver associations that are exporting or selling their masks and figures to West African traders. Only a few Idoma works have entered commodification because of colonization and the transformation of trans-Saharan trade.

=== Iron-smelting and blacksmithing ===
Iron smelting furnace remains dating back to the 5th century have been found, conveying that iron-smelting had an important role in Idoma society. Past Idoma smiths were known to make iron tools and weapons. They worked in secret and achieved high status through their work. Much of their work was seen as sacred and would be intertwined with rituals. However, use and knowledge iron smelting and blacksmithing faded away in the 1920s-30s when British colonization was fully under control. This disappearance of blacksmithing is due to the British importing ready-made mild steel to Africa.

=== Cloth weaving and dyeing ===
Cloth weaving and dyeing is greatly practiced and developed In Idoma society, especially in northern and central Idomaland. Dominated by women, they use local raw material, like cotton from yam farms, and handlooms to make cloths. Then, they dye the cotton cloth, often using the common indigo colored dye called Etu. The traditional fabric called opa is made for wrapping corpses before burial and religious rites.

The traditional colors of the Idoma people are red and black stripes. This has only been around since the 1980s to foster a distinct Idoma identity.

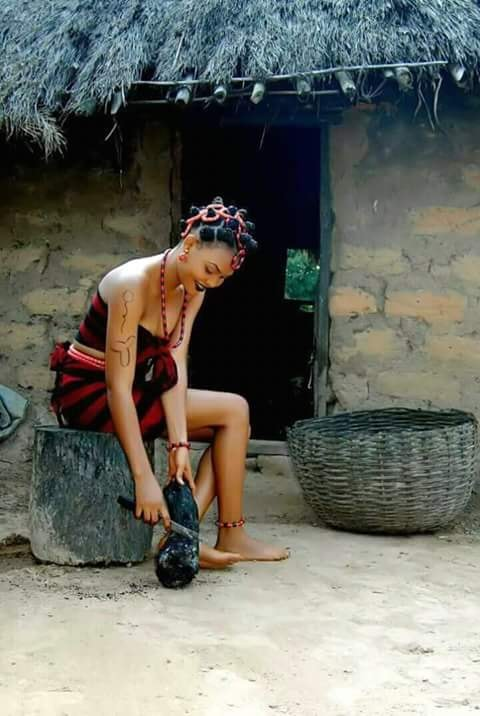
Young Idoma woman wearing traditional colors peeling yam

=== Wood carving ===
Wood carvers are also very important to Idoma society. Using local soft and hard wood, they make doorposts, hoe handles, cutlasses, knives, mortars and pestles, sculptures, masquerade masks, a special three-legged wooden chair for elders called ukonobo, and okwute, the staff of the Oche.

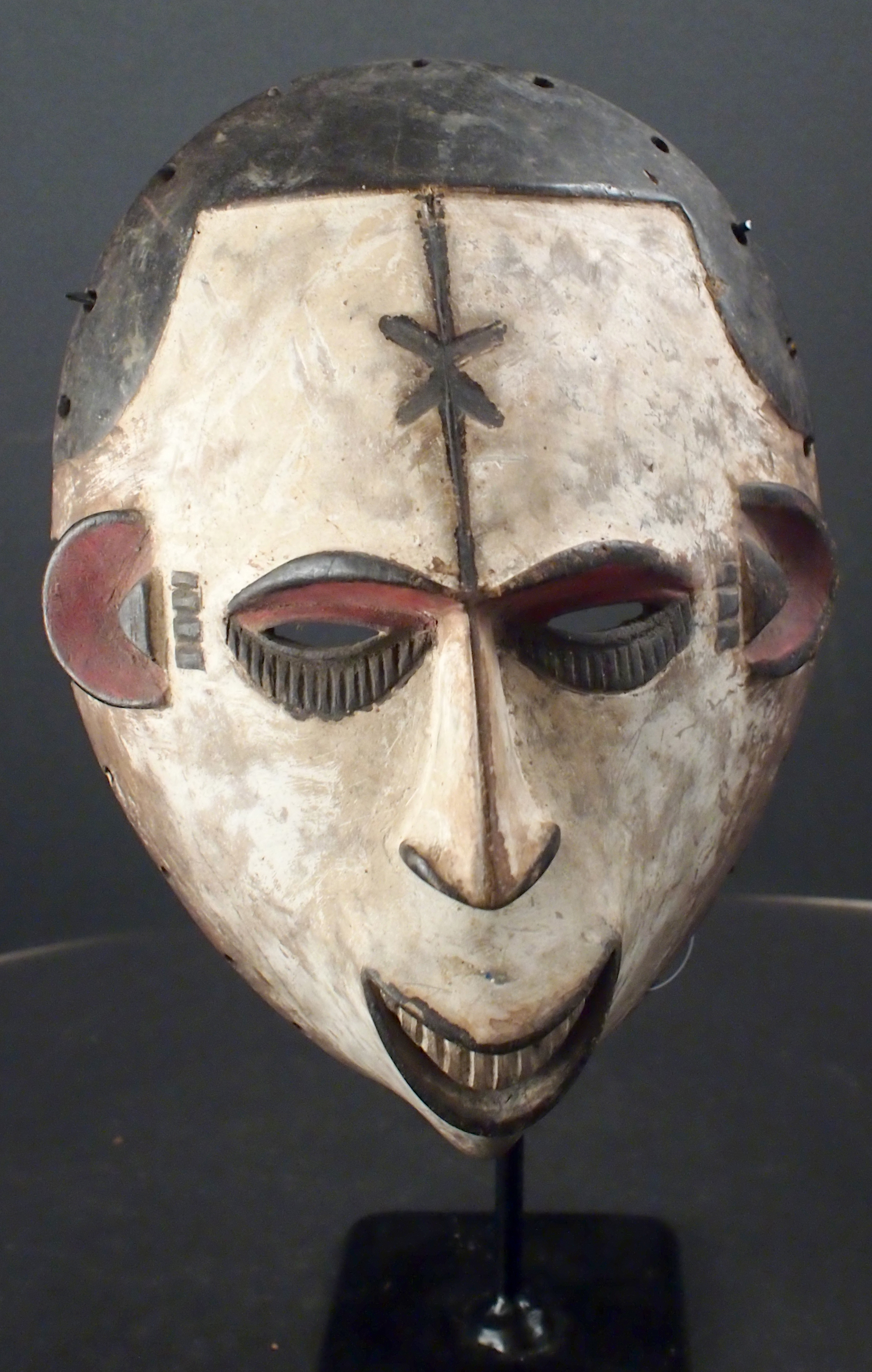
Small Idoma mask. Made of wood, kaolin, black pigment, red pigment, and possibly Cam wood paste.

Using wood allows the carver to take their time with the work. Most of the carver's time is spent thinking about next steps for each stroke and cut. However, this process of thinking is the most difficult part, especially since Idoma carvers do not use sketches or models. A carver must be able to mentally visualize his next steps. Additionally, once a carver makes a mark, it is final. Mistakes cannot be undone like in iron-forging.

One or two carvers usually live in an Idoma village. Any man can learn how to carve, but it is through an informal process as the Idoma do not have a formal system of apprenticeship. Carving is instead learned through observation of another carver and personal practice. As a result, an Idoma carver can be very creative and form their own style. For the Idoma, exact replication is not the goal of the learning process. However, each genre still has some specific conventions to follow in order to be recognizable.

A carver's level of recognition depends on his skill and other local competition. It is also determined by what else he does as carving is usually a part-time job. The carver is more likely known for what else he does, like his farming success, his governing position, his ability as a divinator, his membership in secret societies, or his dancing/singing/instrumental skills. Idoma carvers will often choose another creative and expressive part time role.

Depending on the commission and patron, Idoma carvers have varying degrees of creative freedom. The Idoma carver might need to use a conservative and structured style for one patron, while another patron might tolerate and even encourage innovation. For instance, commissions from the ancestral mask cults usually have many restrictions and less freedom to innovate. Commissions for regulatory society masks, which are controlled by young men, give the carver more freedom to be creative, especially since they enjoy new, modern things. Commissions for children's masks give carvers complete creative freedom.

Two notable Idoma artists are Oba and Ochai. Oba, from the village of Otobi, was an important Idoma artist during 1930–1950. He was known to carve female shrine figures for the Anjenu. Ochai was also from the village of Otobi but was active around 1910–1950. He was a full-time sculptor who carved lots of Idoma figures and masks. He also took commissions from other villages besides his own, which was uncommon. Ochai might have been a mentor to Oba, which was atypical as Idoma carvers did not have a formal apprenticeship system.

== Masquerades and masks ==
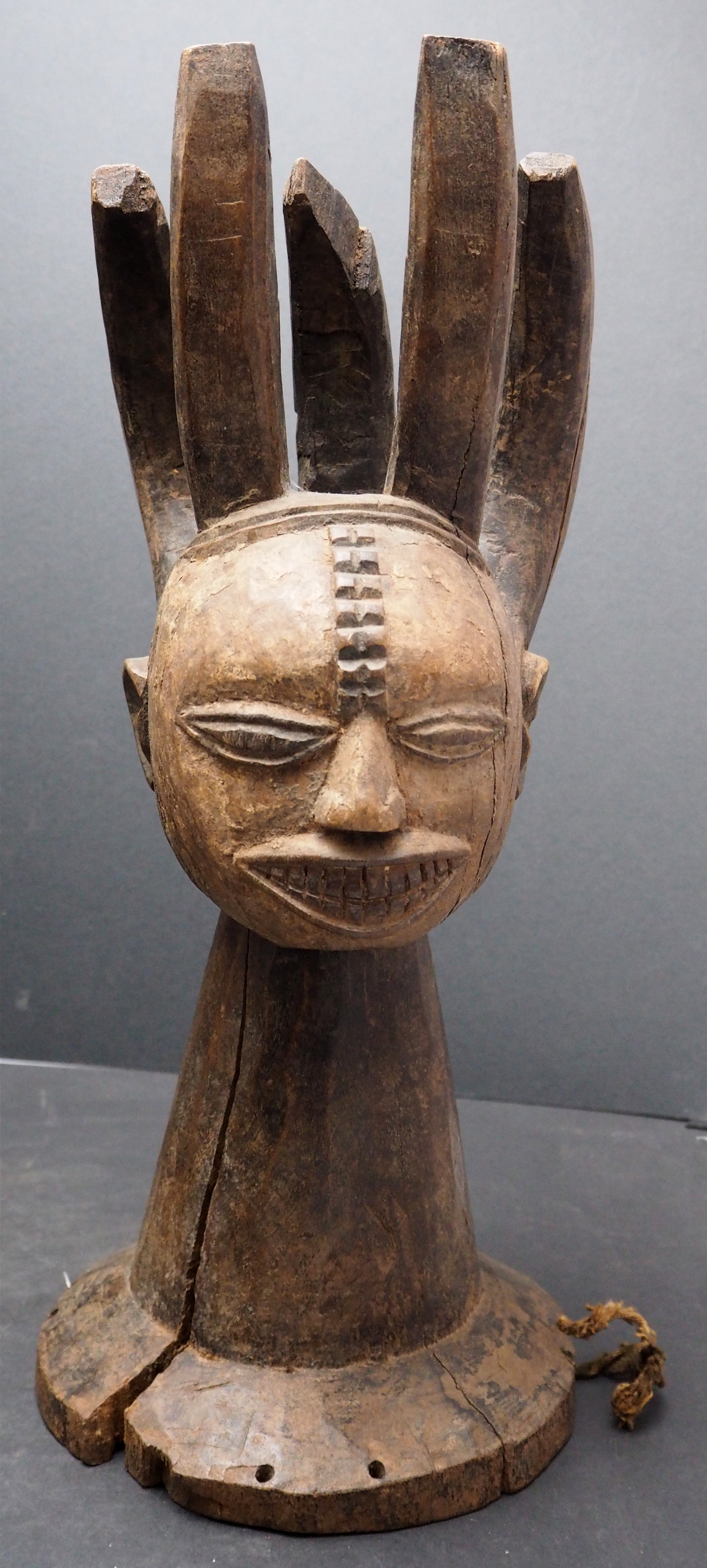
Ceremonial Idoma headdress

Masking is very important to Idoma culture and used in a variety of ways. They are utilized to embody ancestral spirits. "Modern" play masks are used during winter holidays by male children and teens to bum money off people. Masks are also operated by several dance associations and secret societies to entertain and control the community. The power of social control comes from the spirits of the mask. These masking societies are run by young men and use masks with headdresses, crests, and horizontal orientations. Each masking organization has a specific mask that represents them. In contemporary times, most Idoma masks are used during funerals and secular activities. One of the most well-known masquerades is the Oglinye Masquerade.

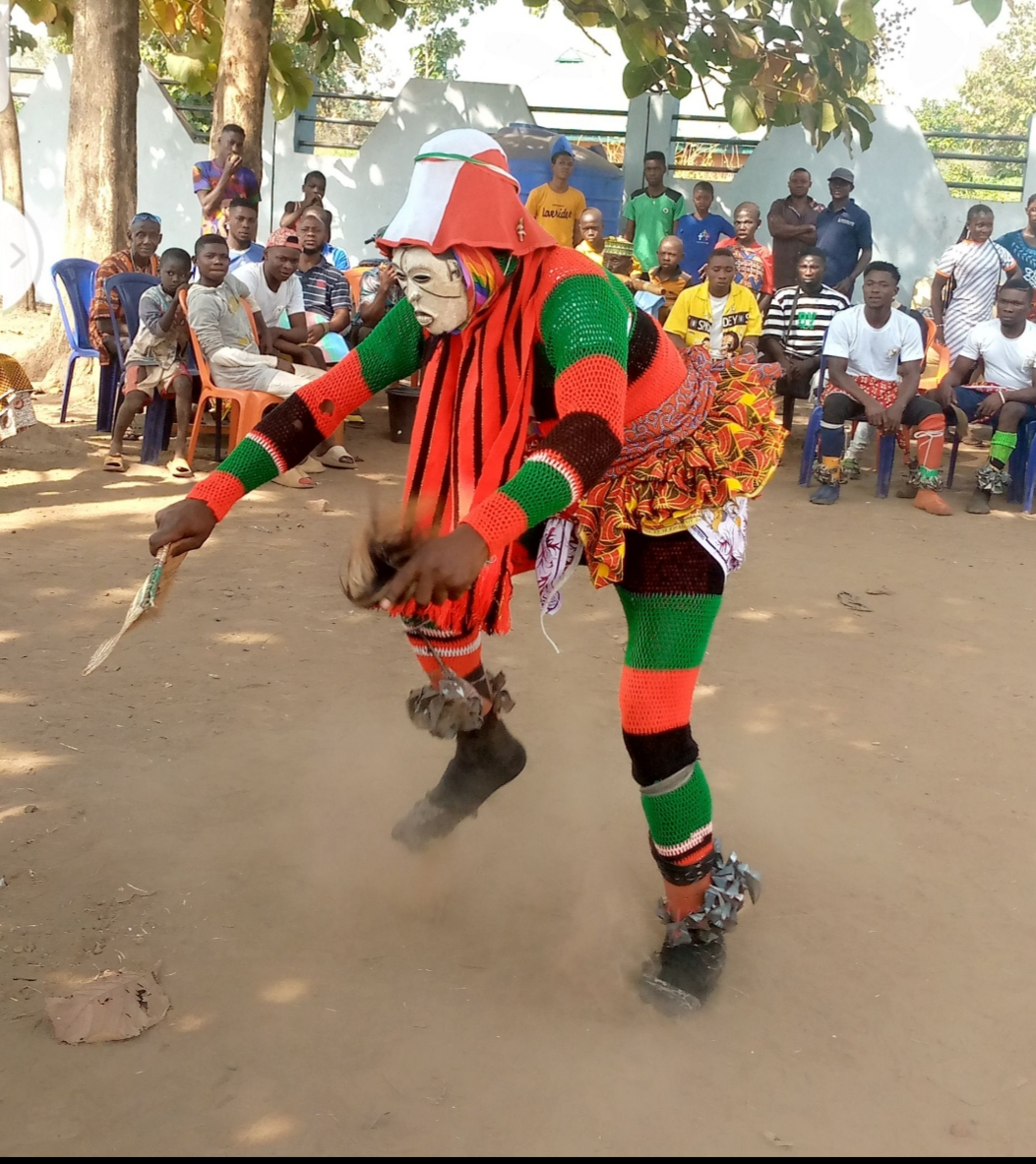
An example of an Oglinye masquerader performing to honor the death of an elder.

=== Oglinye ===
Oglinye is both the name of a warrior's masquerade and a mask. Oglinye has significantly changed throughout Idoma history. In the 19th century, Oglinye was a warrior masquerade that danced with the skulls, or "trophy heads", of enemies. During this time, Idoma men had to slay an enemy and take his head in order to reach manhood and earn the right to marry. Failing to headhunt made an Idoma male an outcast in the community. This wild and aggressive masqueradeperformance celebrated the warrior's success and masculinity. Additionally, to maintain control, Idoma elders made the warrior masqueraders members of the auita, "sons of the law," a position similar to a policeman. The elder's took advantage of the dancers' aggressive energy to remind people of the law. Then, in 1917, British colonization banned headhunting and warfare, making them punishable by hanging. So, to replace the traditional enemy head, Oglinye masks were carved. These masks became representations of the trophy head and warriorhood. The police role of the dancers, the aiuta, continued. However, it was now also control by the districted chief heads chosen by the British; thus, allowing the British to maintain social control. As time has passed, the Oglinye masquerade has slowly faded. Modern Idoma men do not see themselves as "warriors" like past Idoma men did and the control of the aiuta has passed down to the Native Court system. Now, warrior masquerades only perform occasionally, and when they do, it's usually for commemorative funerals of fellow masquerade members.

==== Oglinye mask ====
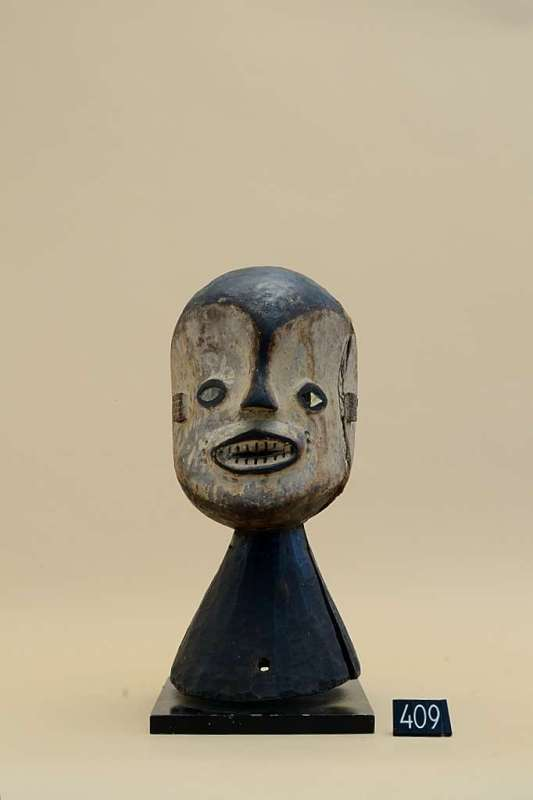
An Oglinye Idoma headdress mask. The white face is dyed with kaolin.

The Oglinye crest masks are part of the Oglinye warrior's masquerade and are common in southern Idomaland. Made of wood and metal, the mask is tied to the top of the costume and surrounds the whole head. The mask represents the enemy's head with their mouth and eyes partly open, showing the victim in the in-between moment of life to death. The coiffure on some of these masks are inspired by the crest masks of the Ejagham people.

==== Ichahoho mask ====
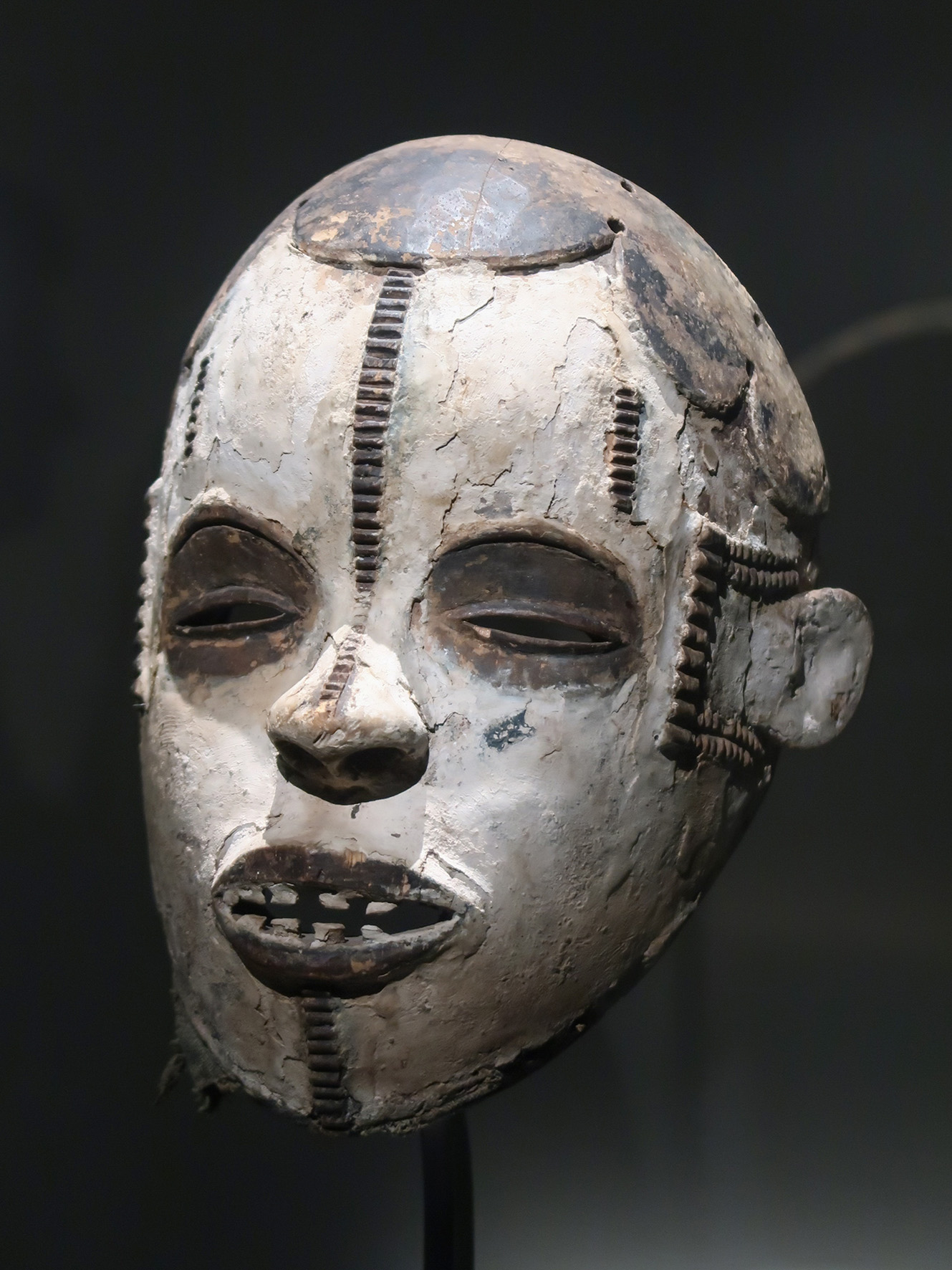
An Idoma mask, possibly an Oglinye or Ichahoho mask. Made of wood, kaolin, fabric, and bamboo.

The black-and-white Ichahoho face masks are also part of the Oglinye warrior's masquerade and are common in southern Idomaland. With a machete, the Ichahoho masquerader pretends to provoke and fight older males. In the past, the masquerade conveyed aggressive warrior hood, but now it shows youthful pride. The Ichahoho masks are carved in the round to replicate the form of the human head. They have rounded cheeks and foreheads/temples with carved vertical rows of scarification marks. The white of the mask was inspired by the Idoma neighbors, the Igbo. Like the Oglinye mask, the Ichahoho masks are also representations of the enemy, but they are more naturalistic.

=== Ancestral masks ===
Unlike the warrior's masquerade masks, ancestral masks are not carved out of wood and are instead made of textiles. Ancestral masks include the unaaloko and alekwuafia. The unaaloko is a royal mask made by a mask spirit called och'aba ("chief of masqueraders"). The alekwuafia is a mask made by a ritual tailor who was chosen in a dream. The dream shows the ritual tailor how to make the mask, and he becomes an "abakpa". The ritual tailor, or now "abakpa," must follow the dream's instructions, create the mask in secret, and must adhere to all of the ritual rules. The purpose for this secrecy is to maintain the belief that the alekwuafia is the actual embodiment of this lineage of ancestors. A masquerader goes on to perform the alekwuafia and becomes the embodied ancestors.

== Performances (Ije) ==
Music and dance are the genres that define Idoma performance and are referred to as Ije. Music and dance are woven together, and one cannot happen without the other. Only through repeated performances, or Ije, are Idoma oral traditions and literature preserved. Ije can be grouped into two categories: ritual and entertainment.

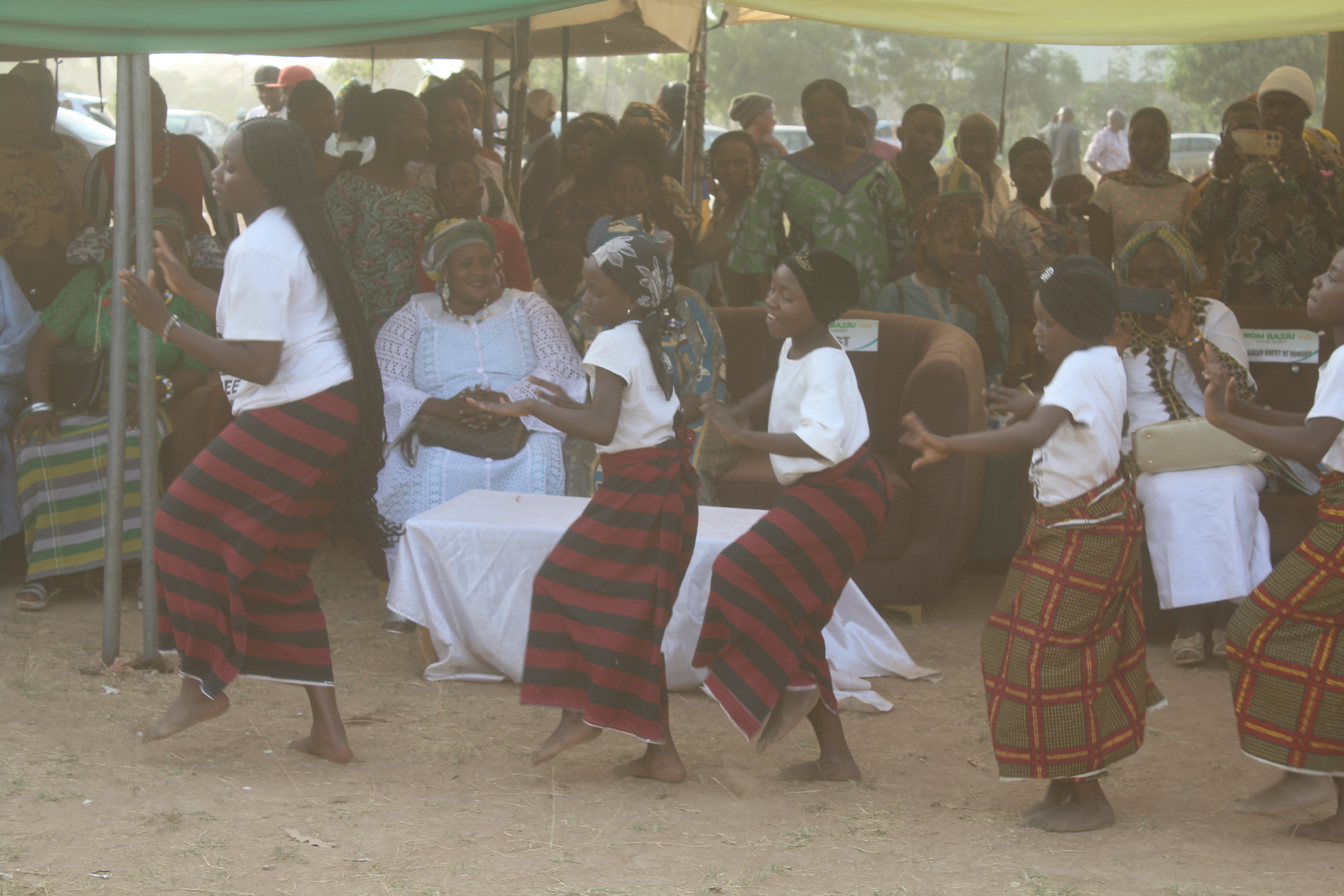
An Idoma performance at the Bajju Cultural Festival.

=== Ritual performances ===
The Idoma believe in three planes of existence: the world of the living, the dead, and the unborn. It's essential to maintain a connection between these worlds as it is believed that ancestors can guide and support the world of the living through their divine powers. Ije is used to connect these three worlds. Ije that make this divine intervention possible include the akitakpa dance and the ije okanga (okanga dance) or ije agogo (agogo dance). The akitakpa dance enables the ancestors to physically enter the world of the living and police the community. The ije okanga or ije agogo allows the recently dead spirit to successfully travel to the ancestral world. Without these dances, it is believed that the dead spirit will remain between the world of the living and the dead, a state of perpetual loneliness. Thus, these performances are only performed for people have led good lives.

=== Entertainment performances ===
Entertainment Ije has many uses. They represent Idoma labor and how they use their environment for survival. They represent the community's values and standards of behavior. They are a form of exercise to maintain the body the Idoma need for everyday life, like farming and hunting. And they are a form of education for the Idoma. Entertainment Ije are usually staged in the form of an arc that represents the format of hunting expeditions. Dancers will move around this imaginary circle. The Idoma have several entertainment performances, but the most popular include the Ode and Okpirigidi. The Ode, full of energy and vitality, celebrates achievement and success. The dancers of the performance are the individuals who are receiving the congratulations. Consisting of five types of dances, the Ode includes elaborate, colorful costumes; choreographed and rehearsed dances that are aerial and eccentric; several songs; and a large ensemble of nine instruments. The instruments include five horns, two drums, a slit wood instrument, and a rattle. The Okpirigidi literally celebrates dance, translating to "the dance that surpasses all dances". It has six types of dances that are more connected to the ground with lots of maneuverability compared to aerial dances. It plays music using two wooden flutes, three drums and two to four rattles. It also uses masquerades, including Ofro, a masked figure on stilts; Ochopu, head of the village square; and Ogba krekre, the bat.

=== Vocalized performances ===
Some ritual and entertainment performances are vocalized performances. These focus more on the singing aspect rather than elaborate instrumentation and choreography. Vocalized performances include the Ijerije dance, the Odugba dance, the Eje Ete (Ete Dance), the Aja dance, and the Klub dance.

=== The performer ===
In Idoma society the performer is extremely important. He is both an educator, an entertainer, a curator, and a watchdog for the community. The performer satisfies the boredom of daily Idoma work; represents the community's beliefs, values, and norms; helps preserve Idoma oral traditions and history; and helps maintain social order within the community. In Idoma society, art is mainly functional, so a performer's work is not an individual piece but a collective function that is necessary for him to be part of the Idoma society. If the performer refuses to perform, he risks losing his identify and birthright. As a result, the Idoma see performing as a social duty.

Performers include dancers, singers, and instrumentalists. However, there is not a separation between them as they are all interrelated and depend on one another. A performer is also not stuck with one role. Performers can change or even play all three roles at once. All able-bodied members of the Idoma society are taught how to dance, sing, and play instruments. Education of these roles are gained through participation in festivals, games, and social events. Regardless of everyone learning how to perform, some performers are more focused and practiced in specific areas.

==== Dancers ====
In Idoma dance, there are two kinds of training. First is learning through observation and imitation of performances. This form of teaching is usually associated with ritual or religious dances because the predetermined steps are simple and any others come from the performer's own improvisation. The second is learning through physical teaching and rehearsals. A good choreographer of a particular dance will be invited to teach new dancers. Once the dancers have the choreography understood, they will rehearse daily. Rehearsal may go on for six months to a year, sometimes even longer, before they perform in public. This form of training is often associated with social and entertainment dances as they have more choreography and structure. Most Idoma dances are very loose and versatile, so to be a good Idoma dancer, they must be flexible. They also must understand the instrumental ensemble. It is essential to be able to interpret drum rhythms and phrases, as well as coordinate dance moves with the rhythm and timing of each song.

The most famous traditional dance of the Idoma people is known as Ogirinya dance. It is a highly energetic dance that requires jumping (at regular intervals) on the toes in a short period of time. It also requires twisting of the body at every interval. A video of the Ogirinya dance can be viewed on YouTube. Dancers putting on the Idoma attire (traditional colors) can be seen in both links.

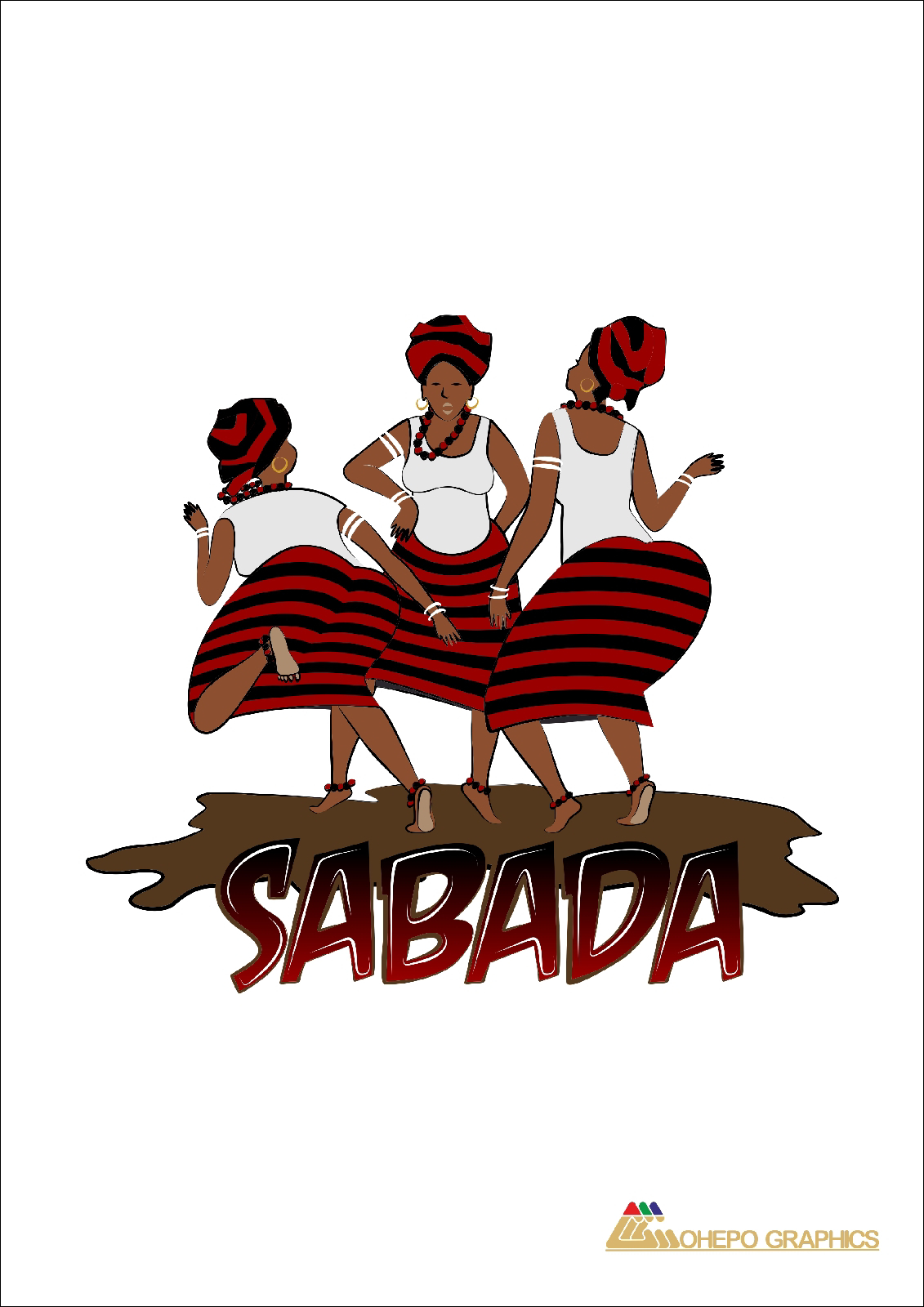
A Digital Art of elegant and energetic dancers from the Idoma speaking tribe of Benue State, Nigeria in their cultural attire of Red and Black strips.

==== Singers ====
In Idoma singing there are many learning steps. A singer has to train their voice by practicing tonal and inflectional styles. They must be able to imitate well-known singers and birds. They have to learn the stories and histories of the community from the elders. They must learn how to improvise and use in their improvisations proverbs, idioms, and poetry. To be seen as a good singer, people need to perceive that the singer is sensitive to rhythm; has a good memory, a pleasant voice, some ability to create songs, and to encourage the audience to join in choral entries. Singers' training also includes spending time with the elders to develop their vocabulary.

==== Instrumentalists ====
Instrumentalists are taught how to play instruments and all about rhythm. For instance, a drummer learns the meanings and messages behind certain rhythms and how to communicate using drums. The whole community will have basic knowledge of these meanings. Instrumentalists also learn to replicate the tones and inflections of actual speech. A good instrumentalist is an individual who was exposed to their instrument since they were young and had a father who could play well. This allows the instrumentalists to be more comfortable and creative with the instrument.

== Traditional religion ==
In Idoma society, religion is ingrained into daily life and the community, greatly influencing Idoma world views. Every Idoma citizen is part of the religious process of the community, so to be without religion is to be without community and kinship. Idoma religion believes in only one supreme God called Owoicho. Owoicho is so transcendent that he gives managing human society to the intermediary-gods like deities and Alekwu (ancestors). Deities include the Ejembi (the guardian spirit), Anjenu (water spirits), Egli-Enyanwu (the sun goddess), and Owo (everyone has their own personal Owo God). The Idoma use masks, powerful protective icons, and medicines in religious practices. For instance, Idoma carvers sculpt figures for the shrines of Anjenu using materials like wood, string, beads, and pigment. The sculpted figures are then placed on Anjenu shrines to beckon the nature spirits of nearby rivers, like the Benue river, to receive offerings. Some Anjenu sculptures show a sitting woman with long breasts holding a child in her lap. Others may show a scared animal, like a hornbill, lion, or leopard. Idoma carvers might also make ekwotame icons that represent prosperity and well-being. These icons were often shown with maternal images.

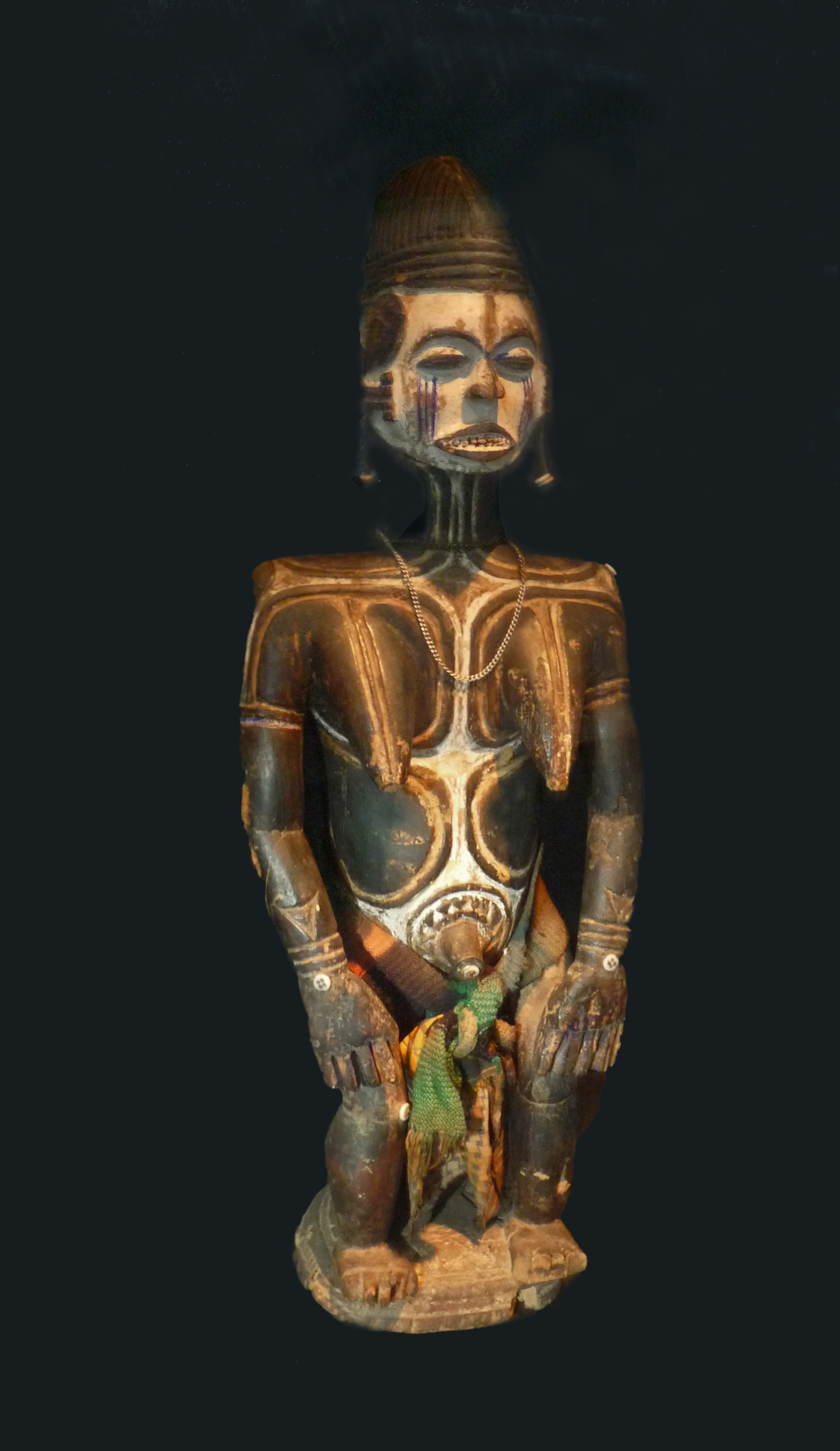
Sculpture of a seated woman, possibly Anjenu. Made of wood, pigments, fabric, mother-of-pearl button, and metal.

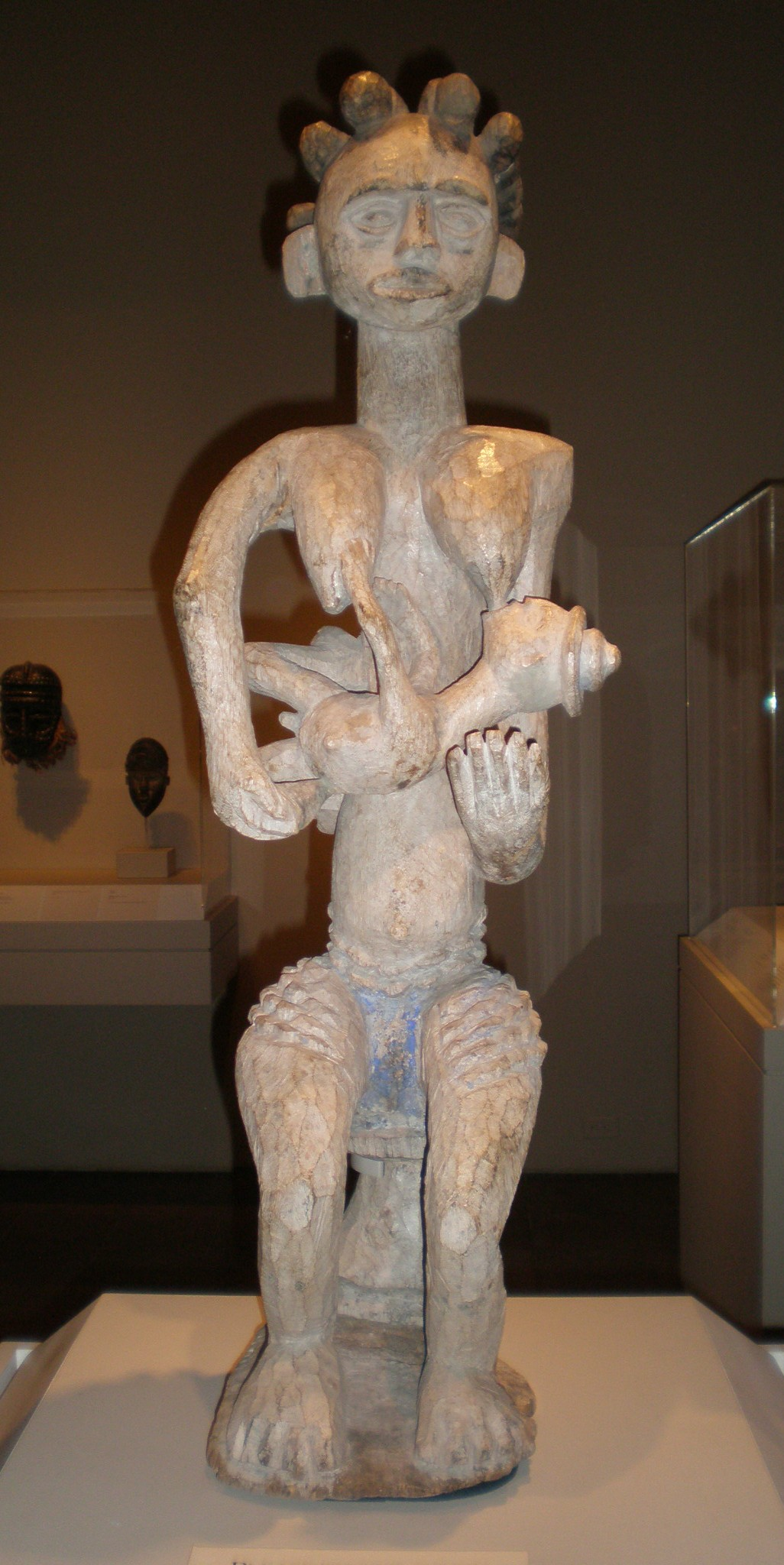
Sculpted Idoma maternity figure. Made of wood.

=== Alekwu ===
The Alekwu are the ancestors of the Idoma. Along with being ancestral spirits, they are the enforcement officers of Owoicho, protecting and guarding the community from evil forces, diseases, and wrongdoers. Alekwu also advise the community about things like marriage, land prosperity, and dangerous journeys. A soul may join this guiding ancestral cult as long as they meet the following requirements: they must be married or a respected unmarried person; they must not be evil; and they must be 50 years old or older. The Idoma celebrate the Alekwu through continual libations and several ritual celebrations. One of these celebrations includes the large annual Alekwu Festival, or "Eje Alekwu" festival, where traditional religious practitioners commune and make sacrifices to worship their ancestors across the land.

==== Alekwu Festival ====
The Alekwu Festival is about honoring the ancestors and includes masquerades, dances, music, feasting, prayers, and offerings. Taking place anytime between 15 and 25 December, the Alekwu Festival lasts five days and requires lots of preparation.

Five months before the festival, selected Idoma masqueraders become the "carriers" of the ancestral spirits. These masqueraders lose their identity and become the Alekwu, wearing the costumes and accessories of the ancestor. During these five months, the embodied Alekwu polices and entertains the community. This time also give the Idoma people an opportunity to reconnect with their ancestors. The costume of the Alekwumasquerader comes in a variety of different shapes and sizes. Starting at the top is the wood carved headgear. This headgear may have figurines or images of men, animals, spirits, and/or effigies. Around the headgear is a see-through net like piece of hand-woven cloth called Ebari or Ohira that covers the face and the back of the head down to the neck. From the neck down, the body is covered with Iko. Iko are pleated white strands made from scraped banana or plantain stems. Ebari cloth or lli ochi, another type of hand-woven cloth, covers the arms and legs. Tree seed shell bells are worn on the ankles and wrists. Overall, these costumes can come in a variety of different ways. A performance with this costuming, as well as music and dance forms a union between the masquerader and the lineage of ancestors. The masquerader then loses his self and becomes the ancestors. As these ancestors, he can now perform stunts, displays, songs, and dances no mortal can, showing that he is embodied by the spirit.

The ancestors depart from the masqueraders three to four days before the Alekwu Festival begins. This departure happens through the Ire Alekwu or Ike Alekwu masquerade performance. Located in the populated market square, this masqueradeperformance includes music with instruments like drums and flutes, songs, dancing, and other masqueraders called Elechi. Songs in this masquerade performance include a song that praises the historical roots of the clan, a song that warns audience members to not copy the masquerade dancers or to challenge the sacredness of the masqueraders, a song that warns people to not be evil and mess with the masquerades, a song warning to not try to find the secrets of the masquerade, and a song praising the artistry of the masquerades. During some of these songs, the crowd joins in with the singing. Normally, the songs/dances start off slower, rise in speed, and then come to abrupt stop to signify the end of the particular song/dance. The Elechi masqueraders are known as ruffians that cause pandemonium and create excitement and fear. They run at spectators with a whip to ensure the crowd does not get too close to the masqueraders. This is important because the crowd, especially the women, can't know the secrets of the masquerader nor can they touch them. If they do find out or touch them, the Idoma believe they will be at risk to infertility or other afflictions. During this market masquerade, the community strengthens its connection to Owoicho and receives final blessings from embodied Alekwu. The masquerade performance ends when the masqueraders and the ancestors they embody return to their shrines until the next year.

The day after this masquerade performance is the eve of the Alekwu Festival. Now that the ancestors are back in the spiritual world, they are guided with the Okanga Dance return to their homestead, the home of their eldest son. This dance happens at night and involves music, singing, and dancing, but no masqueraders embodying an ancestor. Then, goats, cows, or hens are sacrificed to the ancestors.

The next day start the Alekwu Festival. It begins with a communal feast where meat and wine are consumed and citizens talk with each other. The feast is important because the ancestors want payment for the good they have brought to the living.

The rest of the Alekwu Festival includes multiple celebrations and worshipping of the Alekwu. Besides honoring ancestors and reestablishing spiritual connections, the Alekwu Festival brings the community together and reaffirms the Idoma identity. It's a time for entertainment and relieves the stressors of the hard work Idoma must do to survive. It is also a reminder about Idoma social and religious values. Overall, the Alekwu Festival encapsulates and celebrates Idoma religion and life.

=== The sacred king, Oche ===
Idoma religion states that the king, or the Oche, is chosen by God and is God's representative. He is the connection between the spirit realm and the earthly realm. Several religious rites and rituals are involved with kingship ceremonies. For instance, when a new king comes forth, he is dressed like a corpse and symbolically buried. Then, he is "resurrected" as a spirit-being, becoming the earthly representative of Owoicho, deities, and Alekwu. He also now carries all the wisdom and attributes of the ancestors.

=== Aje (the earth) and sacred land ===
The Idoma believe in the Aje, the earth. The Aje is the physical manifestation of Owoicho and the giver of life. The Idoma depend on it for shelter, food, and the place that they lay to rest when death comes. As the intermediary between the divine and mortal, the Oche is also known as the Ond'aje (owner of the land). Given this, the Oche is the chief priest of Aje/Earth shrines. The Oche carries out periodic sacrifices to Aje, the earth cult, to make sure the living receives blessings, guidance, and protection from the gods and the Alekwu. The importance of the Aje is likely due to the Idoma mainly being agriculturalists and hunters.

Land is also very sacred to the Idoma because they bury their dead within the family compound. This makes the land underneath Idoma settlements the ancestral world, the home of the ancestors. Non-ancestral spirits, like animals, trees, streams, strangers, enemies, and sometimes Idoma who have died of unnatural causes or did not have a proper funeral, are believed to live in uninhabited areas of the forest.

=== Life and death ===
The Idoma believe in life after death. Given that belief, the Idoma have burial ceremonies with music and dances. Only through theses burial ceremonies can the deceased leave the living world and enter the ancestral world. These burial ceremonies vary in size as the extent of the burial rite depends on how much money the relatives have to use.

Additionally, the Idoma believe you are rewarded by God for being good and you are punished by God for being evil. The level of punishment varies depending on your actions. These punishments are enforced by Alekwu and are thought to happen immediately. Furthermore, good and bad actions also follow you into death. When an evil person dies, they must suffer at death as a punishment for their evil behavior before the Alekwu spirit allows them to truly pass into the next world.

=== Purifying warriors ===
When Idoma smiths were prevalent in Idoma society and warriors killed often, the smiths would help purify warriors who had just taken a life. The Idoma believe that after a warrior has killed, whether that be a person or a dangerous animal, he is covered in ogwú, which causes him to act crazy and arrogant. To purify the warrior, the smith would perform the ritual called èogwóonà ("washing the killing from the face"). The smith helps wash off the ogwú by using medicinal leaves that were dipped into the forge water used to cool hot steel or iron. This water is also mixed with the blood of a sacrificed chicken. After the warrior is washed multiple times, he is free from ogwú. This ritual must be done by the blacksmith because the blacksmith made the weapons the warrior used to kill.

=== Marriage ===
While the marriage rites and customs of the Idoma people is not unlike that of the Igbos and some other south-eastern cultures, there are specific aspects that clearly distinguish their tradition. In some Idoma subcultures, the groom and his family have to present the bride with a rooster and some money on the marriage day after the bride price has already been paid. If she accepts, it is a sign of approval and disinterest if she rejects the gift. While there are no certain reasons to justify the need for a rooster, it remains an interesting part of the ceremony.

== Traditional food (Okoho soup) ==
The Idoma people are known for their love of food, as there is an annual food festival in Benue State to celebrate women and the various traditional cuisines. Most popular among their delicacies is the Okoho soup which is made with the peculiar Okoho plant, bush meat and many other ingredients.

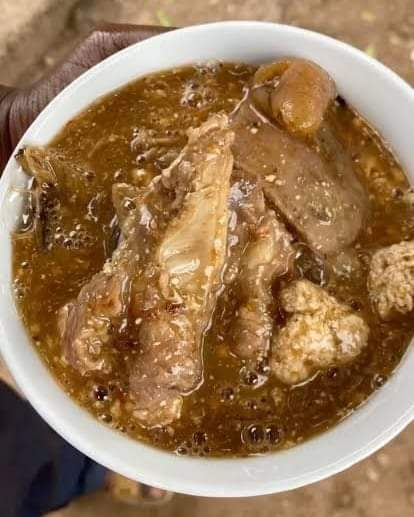
Idoma Okoho soup

Idoma men are obliged by tradition to pound yam for their wives. Unlike other cultures where the women are expected to perform all culinary chores, the Idoma men are not always exempted.

== Government ==
The Idoma have a centralized political system. Before British colonization, the Idoma were governed by elders. This included hereditary title holders, igabo, and a spiritual leader/king, the Oche. However, every twenty-two Idoma groups ruled themselves independently and had their own government of igabo and their Oche.

The Oche is often an older man and he relies on the igabo to advise him. The igabo then rely on young warrior aged men to protect their community, farms, and forests against neighbors. These young men were also responsible for helping to maintain the law. For instance, they would help prevent and stop stealing. The Oche is chosen by the Idoma people. Selection was based on how powerful the potential Oche appears, if he had a strong personality, if he could be a war leader, if he could mediate and truthfully judge disputes within the community, and if he could maintain law and order. An example of a past Oche includes the former Ad'Ogbadibo of Orokam, Late Chief D.E Enenche.

In pre-colonial Idoma, the Oche received many privileges. He had the right to royal music. He received trophies of game (hunted animals), symbols of war and achievement, elephant tusks, lion and leopard skins, feathers of the Senegal coucal, uloko, and slaves as royal tributes. He was given special food, like the first meat of the hunting season or the thigh of a cow sacrificed for a burial. He was also the wealthiest as he had the largest farms that citizens would help him with. All of this special status and treatment was given to the Oche because he maintained and enforced the laws, especially laws against adultery, stealing, murder and homicide. He also enacted religious and socio-political functions. As the symbol of unity in the community, the Oche maintained culture and tradition.

When the British administration came in, the British successfully put up the office of Och'Idoma as the main authority for the twenty-two Idoma groups. Given this, each chief came together to form a "traditional council" (eventually the Idoma Native Authority) where they would elect the first Och'Idoma in 1948. The Och'Idoma gave the British an intermediary and a way to administer the twenty-two independent Idoma groups.

The Palace of the Och'Idoma is located at Otukpo, Benue State. The present Och'Idoma, HRM ("His Royal Majesty"), Elaigwu Odogbo John, the 5th Och'Idoma of the Idoma People was installed on 30 June 2022. His placement followed the passing of his Predecessor HRH ("His Royal Highness") Agabaidu Elias Ikoyi Obekpa who ruled from 1996 to October 2021. Past Och'Idomas also include: HRH, Agabaidu Edwin Ogbu, who reigned from 1996 to 1997; HRH, Abraham Ajene Okpabi of Igede descent who ruled from 1960 to 1995; and HRH, Agabaidu Ogiri Oko whose reign took place between 1948 and 1959.

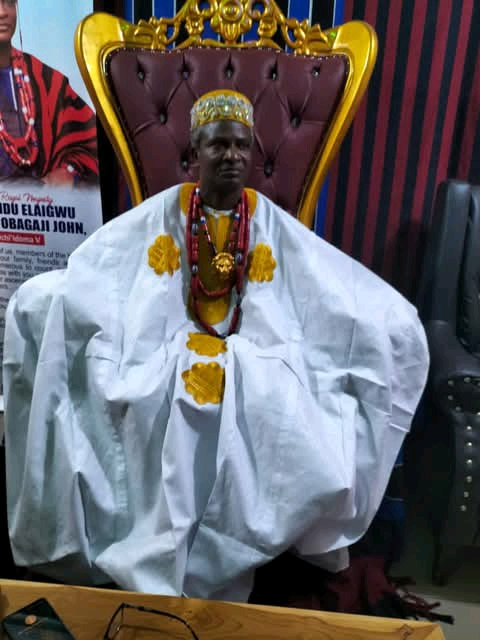
The present Och'doma: Agaba-Idu HRM Elaigwu Odogbo Obagaji John Och'doma

== Notable Idoma people ==
- Bongos Ikwue, musician
- 2baba Innocent Idibia, musician
- Abba Moro, former Benue state Algon Chairman, former Minister of Interior, Senator, educationist
- Ada Ameh, Nigerian actress
- Audu Ogbeh, former Minister of Communications, former National Chairman of PDP, former Minister of Agriculture & Rural Development
- Jerry Agada, former State Minister of Education, author and essayist
- Lawrence Onoja, former military governor of Plateau State and Katsina State, Nigeria and Principal Staff Officer
- Monica Ogah, Nigerian Singer and winner, MTN Project Fame, Season 4
- Moses Ochonu, author, historian
- Sharon Ooja, Nollywood actress
- Susan Peters, Nollywood actress
- Terry G, Nigerian musician
- Dr Paul Enenche, founder of Dunamis International Gospel Centre

== Sources ==
- Abraham, R.C., The Idoma Language. Idoma Wordlists. Idoma Chrestomathy. Idoma Proverbs. Published by the Author on behalf of the Idoma Native Administration, Government of Nigeria. 1951.
- Ethnologue Language Tree: Idomoid;
- Armstrong, Robert G. 1983. The Idomoid languages of the Benue and Cross-River valleys.;
- Bennett, Patrick R. & Sterk, Jan P. (1977) "South Central Niger-Congo: A reclassification" Studies in African Linguistics 8: Vol. 13, No. 1, pp. 241–273;
- journalofwestafricanlanguages.org
