= Yala language =

Idomoid language of Ogoja, Nigeria

Yala
- Nkum
- Native to: Nigeria
- Region: Cross River State
- Native speakers: 200,000 (2008)
- Language family: Niger–Congo?: Atlantic–Congo; Volta–Niger; noi; Idomoid; Etulo–Idoma; Idoma; Yala

Language codes
- ISO 639-3: yba
- Glottolog: yala1263

Yala (Iyala) is an Idomoid language of Ogoja, Nigeria. Blench (2019) lists dialects as Ikom, Obubra, and Ogoja.
