= Ayere language =

Volta–Niger language spoken in Nigeria

Ayere
- Oyuwu
- Native to: Nigeria
- Region: Kogi State
- Native speakers: (3,000 cited 1992)
- Language family: Niger–Congo?: Atlantic–Congo; Volta–Niger; Ayere–Ahan; Ayere

Language codes
- ISO 639-3: aye
- Glottolog: ayer1245

Ayere (Oyuwu) is an endangered divergent Volta–Niger language of Nigeria, closely related only to Ahaan.

It is named after Ayere village in Ijumu LGA, Kogi State, which is the only village where it is spoken. There are fewer than 3,000 speakers of Oyuwu left.

== Distribution ==
According to Ethnologue, Ayere (Oyuwu) is spoken in:

- Kogi state: Ijumu LGA (in Ayere village).

== See also ==
- Ayere-Ahan word lists (Wiktionary)
