= Akoko language =

Volta–Niger dialect cluster of Nigeria

(North) Akoko
- Arigidi
- Native to: Nigeria
- Region: Ondo State, Kogi State, Ekiti State, Edo State
- Native speakers: (48,000 cited 1992)
- Language family: Niger–Congo?: Atlantic–Congo; Volta–Niger; YEAI; (North) Akoko

Language codes
- ISO 639-3: aqg
- Glottolog: arig1246

North Akoko, usually abbreviated as Akoko and also known as Arigidi, is a dialect cluster spoken in Nigeria. It is a branch of the YEAI ("Yoruba–Edo–Akoko–Igbo") (YEAI) group of the Niger–Congo languages. According to Ethnologue, it is spoken in the Akoko Edo, and the LGAs of Akoko North East, Akoko North West, Ekiti East, and Ijumu.

A short introductory exposé of Arigidi in Arigidi language by a native speaker

A short introductory exposé of Oke-agbe in Oke-agbe language by a native speaker

== Varieties ==
Akokoid varieties include Arigidi, Erúṣú, Oyín, Ìgáṣí Eṣé, Urò, Ọ̀jọ̀, Àfá, Ògè, Ìdò, and Àjè.

Below is a list of Arigidi language names, populations, and locations from Blench (2019).

Language	Alternate spellings	Own name for language	Endonym(s)	Other names (location-based)	Speakers	Location(s)
Arigidi cluster						Ondo State, Akoko North LGA; Kwara State, Kogi LGA
Afa		Ọ̀wọ̀n Àfá	Àfá	Oke–Agbe		Ondo State, Akoko North LGA, Oke–Agbe town, Affa section
Arigidi			Arìgìdí			Ondo State, Akoko North LGA, Arigidi town
Eruṣu	Erusu, Erushu		Erúṣú			Ondo State, Akoko North LGA, Eruṣu town
Ese		Ọ̀wọ̀n Èsé	Èsé	Aje, Oke–Agbe		Ondo State, Akoko North LGA, Oke–Agbe town, Ese section
Igaṣi	Igashi, Igasi	Ọ̀wọ̀n Ìgáṣí	Ìgàshí		45,000 (1986)	Ondo State, Akoko North LGA, Igaṣi town
Oge		Ọ̀wọ̀ Ògè	Òge	Oke–Agbe		Ondo State, Akoko North LGA, Oke–Agbe town, Oge section
Ọjọ						Ondo State, Akoko North LGA, Ajọwa town
Oyin						Ondo State, Akoko North LGA, Oyin–Akoko town
Udo	Ido	Ọ̀wọ̀n Ùdò		Oke–Agbe		Ondo State, Akoko North LGA, Oke–Agbe town, Udo section
Uro					3,000 (1986)	Ondo State, Akoko North LGA, Uro–Ajọwa town

== Internal classification ==
The internal classification of Akokoid language varieties is given by Fadoro (2010) as:

Akokoid

- Arigidi
  - Arigidi
  - Erushu
- Ọ̀wọ̀n
  - varieties in Oke Agbe
    - Afa
    - Aje
    - Udo
    - Oge
  - varieties outside Oke Agbe
    - Oyin
    - Igashi
    - Uro

Arigidi and Erushu are mutually intelligible with each other; varieties spoken in Oke Agbe with each other; and varieties spoken outside Oke Agbe with each other. However, these three groups are not mutually intelligible with each other.

== Reconstructions ==
The following list of Proto-Akokoid reconstructions is from Blench (n.d.).

Gloss	Proto-Akokoid
head	*igírí
hair	*icírí
eye	*íjù
ear	*útó
nose	*úwɔ̃́
mouth	*odòrũ
tooth	*eɲĩ
tongue	*írɛ̃́
jaw	*àmgbà
chin	*ùlɛ, *olò
beard	*ìlɛ̀
neck	*ògúgɔ̀
breast	*íkpɔ
heart	*ɛ̀gɛ̀, *ɔkɔ̃̀
belly	*ìgɔ
stomach	
navel	*ípɔ̃́
back	*òsũ
arm, hand	*úwɔ́
nail	*íŋgà
buttocks	*imbɔ̃̀
penis	*ìndù
vagina	
thigh	#koko
leg	*ùhò
knee	*igɔ̀
body	*ìji
skin	*àla
bone	*íkpĩ

== See also ==
- List of Proto-Akokoid reconstructions (Wiktionary)
