= Volta–Niger languages =

Hypothetical major branch of the Volta-Congo languages

Volta–Niger
- West Benue–Congo or East Kwa
- Geographic distribution: West Africa, from Eastern Ghana to central Nigeria
- Linguistic classification: Niger–Congo?: Atlantic–Congo; Volta–Congo; Volta–Niger
- Subdivisions: Akpes (sometimes considered yeai); Ayere–Ahan; Gbe; yeai (= Defoid+); noi; ? Ukaan

Language codes
- Glottolog: None
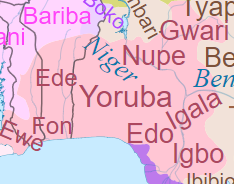
- Map cut-out of Volta-Niger family of languages area, with most of the languages bounded by the Volta river, in modern-day Ghana, and the Niger river, found in modern-day Nigeria

The Volta–Niger family of languages, also known as West Benue–Congo, Kwa or East Kwa, is one of the branches of the Niger–Congo language family, with perhaps 70 million speakers. Among these are the most spoken languages of southern Nigeria, Benin, Togo, and southeast Ghana: Yoruba, Igbo, Bini, and Gbe.

These languages have variously been placed within the Kwa or Benue–Congo families or, starting in the 1970s, combined with them altogether. Williamson & Blench (2000) separate the languages here called Volta-Niger from the others. Güldemann (2018) fails to see clear criteria for dividing the languages into two or three families and maintains the broad grouping and name of Benue-Kwa for all of them.

== Branches ==
The constituent groups of the Volta–Niger family, along with the most important languages in terms of number of speakers, are as follows (with number of languages for each branch in parentheses):

- Volta–Niger
  - Akpes (1)
  - Ayere–Ahan (2)
  - Gbe (21: Fon [2 million], Ewe [3 million], Adja [550,000], Phla–Pherá languages [600,000])
  - yeai
    - Yoruboid (Igala [1 million], Yorùbá [47 million], Ede languages [800,000], Itsekiri [800,000])
    - Edoid (27: Edo [2 million], Urhobo [2 million], Isoko [420,000], Esan [300,000], Etsako [270,000])
    - Akoko (1)
    - Igboid (7: Igbo [40 million], Ikwerre [2 million])
  - noi
    - Nupoid (12: Ebira [1 million], Nupe [1 million])
    - Oko (1)
    - Idomoid (9: Idoma [600,000])
  - ? Ukaan (1)

The Yoruboid languages and Akoko were once linked as the Defoid branch, but more recently they, Edoid, and Igboid have been suggested to be primary branches of an as-yet unnamed group, often abbreviated yeai. Similarly, Oko, Nupoid, and Idomoid are often grouped together under the acronym noi. Ukaan is an Atlantic–Congo language, but it is unclear if it belongs to the Volta–Niger family; Blench suspects it is closer to Benue–Congo.

In an automated computational analysis (ASJP 4) by Müller et al. (2013):

- Gbe and Yoruboid are subsumed within Kwa.
- Edoid and Cross River group together.
- Akpes and Ukaan group together.
- Oko is grouped within Idomoid.

== Branches and locations ==
Clickable Volta-Niger languages displayed in pink

Below is a list of major Volta–Niger branches and their primary locations (centres of diversity) in Nigeria based on Blench (2019).

Distributions of Volta–Niger branches
Branch	Primary locations
Akpes	Akoko North LGA, Ondo State
Ayere–Ahan	Ijumu LGA, Kogi State
Gbe	Badagry LGA, Lagos State and adjacent areas
Yoruboid	Southwestern and Central Nigeria
Edoid	Rivers, Edo, Ondo, Delta and Bayelsa States
Akoko	Akoko North LGA, Ondo State
Igboid	Southeastern Nigeria, Rivers and Delta States
Nupoid	Niger, Kogi, Kwara, Nasarawa States
Oko	Ogori/Magongo LGA, Kogi State
Idomoid	Benue, Cross River, Nasarawa States
Ukaan	Akoko North LGA, Ondo State, Akoko Edo LGA, Edo state

== Comparative vocabulary ==
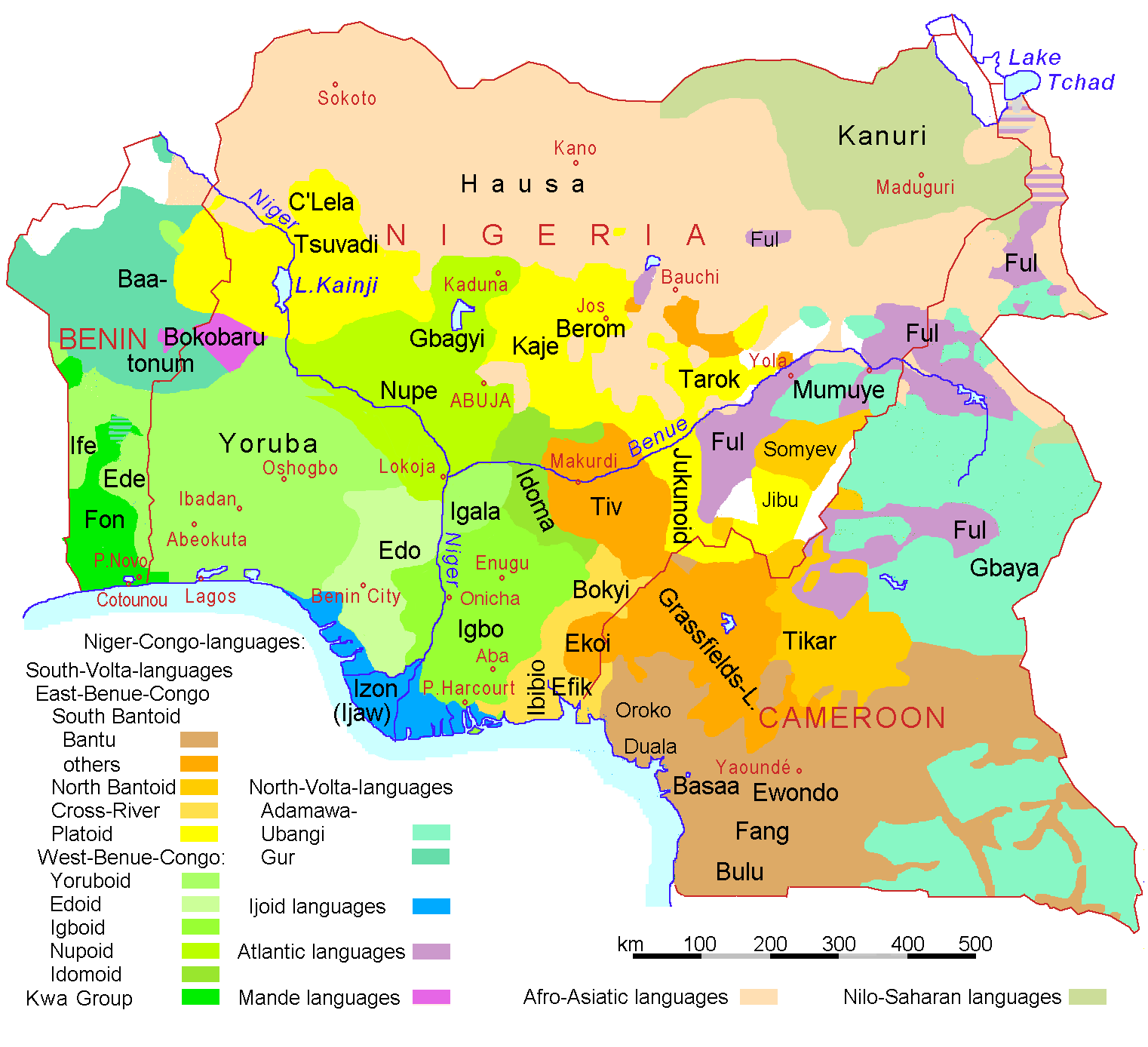
Some important branches of the Volta–Niger and Benue–Congo families are concentrated in Nigeria, Cameroon, and Benin.

Sample basic vocabulary in different Volta–Niger branches:

Language	eye	ear	nose	tooth	tongue	mouth	blood	bone	tree	water	eat	name
Yoruba	ojú	etí	imú	eyín	ahọ́n	ẹnu	ẹ̀jẹ	egungun	igi	omi	jẹ	orúkọ
Proto-Yoruboid	*e-jú	*e-tĩ́	*ɪ-ŋmʊ̃́	*e-ɲĩ́	*ʊ-ɓã́	*a-rʊ̃ã	*ɛ̀-byɛ̀	*V-k'ĩk'ũ	*e-gĩ (i-)	*o-mĩ	*jɛ	*o-ɗú
Proto-Yoruboid	*éjú	*étí	*ímṵ́	*éŋḭ́	Yor. ahá̰	*ɛ́lṵ ?	*ɛ̀gyɛ̀	*égbṵ́gbṵ́	Yor. igi	*ómḭ	*jɛṵ	*órú- ?
Proto-Edoid	*dhI-dhω	*ghU-chɔGɪ	*I-chuəNi; *-chuveNi	*dhI-kωN	*U-dhamhɪ	*A-nuə	*U-ɟɪ-, -ɟɪa		*U-thaNɪ	*A-mɪN	*dhɪ	*dhI-ni
Proto-Gbe		*-tó		*aɖú	*-ɖɛ́	*-ɖũ; *-ɖũkpá	*-ʁʷũ	*-χʷú	*-tĩ́	*-tsĩ	*ɖu	*yĩ́kɔ́
Akoko (Arigidi)	ódʒù	oto	(odʒ)uw̃ɔ̃̀	éɲì̃	ɛŕɛ̀	õrũ	ɛ̀dʒɛ̀	ɛ̀dʒɛ̀	ɔ́hɔ̃̄	edʒĩ	dʒō	
Proto-Akpes; Akpes (Ajowa)	*èyò	*àsùgù	*àhũ	*ìyũ	*ìndàlì	*onu	ìkɔ̃̀n		ɔhuni	imi		ìmũ̀nũ̀
Ayere	ɛ́jɛ́	éndí	ówṹ	éyĩ́	únú	anu	èʃwè	egbe	oŋwu	oyin	ʃe	éwú
Ahan	ewú	éndí	owũ	eɲĩ	irɛ̃́	arũ	èsè	igbegbe		oɲĩ		
Proto-Nupoid	*e-wie	*CV-tuNukpua	*V-bhʊə	*jiNkɔN	*a-giNtara		*V-giə	*CV-kiukuNu	*V-cigbɔNa	*nuNŋʷa	*gi	*CV-jɛ
Proto-Ebiroid	*e-ji	*ʊ-tɔkpa	*a-ʃɪ	*a-ɲɪ	*ɪra-rɛ		*aɲa	*ʧʊku	*ɔ-tʃɪ	*e-ɲi	*rɪ	*ɪrɛ-ʃa
Oko	áɲẽ́	ɔ́tɔ̃́	ɔ́mɔ́dɔ́rɛ̀	írú	ɛ́làárɛ́	ówó	ɛ́ŋɔ̂	ófú	esáma	ébí	jé	íwúrù
Proto-Idomoid	*eyi	*ʊrʊ/a-	*eŋgwu				*ìmàǹjī			*ìmànyì; *ma-yeni ?	*ri	*ɛɲɪ
Proto-Ukaan	*ìdʒì	*ʊrʊgV	*ɔ̀kɔ̃́rɔ̃̀	*ʊ̀ɲʊ̀gV; jɔ̀r	*ɛ̀ɲʊ̃́	*òŋʷṍ	*ùɲṹ	*òɣʷó	*ɔ̀hʊ̃́nṽ	*ùmɔ̃̀	*jé	*ìnĩ́
Proto-Benue–Congo	*-lito	*-tuŋi	*-zua	*-nini, *-nino; *-sana; *-gaŋgo (±)	*-lemi; *-lake		*-zi; *-luŋ	*-kupe	*-titi; *-kwon	*-izi (±); *-ni (±)		*-zina

=== Numerals ===
Comparison of numerals in individual languages:

Classification	Language	1	2	3	4	5	6	7	8	9	10
Akpes	Akpes	íɡbōn / ēkìnì	īdīan(ì)	īsās(ì)	īnīŋ(ì)	īʃōn(ì)	ītʃānās(ì)	ītʃēnētʃ(ì)	ānāānīŋ(ì)	ɔ̀kpɔ̄lɔ̀ʃ(ì)	īyōf(ì)
Defoid, Akokoid	Ariɡidi (Iɡasi)	[kɛ̀ɛ́ɲɛ̃]	[kèji]	[kedà]	[kenɛ]	[kéntɔ̀]	[kefà]	[keɸi]	[kerò]	[kéndà]	[kéjè]
Defoid, Akokoid	Òɡè	[ékán]	[ìyí]	[ídaː]	[ínɛ́]	[ítɔ̃̀]	[ìfà]	[ídʒúí]	[írò]	[ĩ́ŋa]	[íyè]
Defoid, Ayere-Ahan	Ayere (Úwû)	ĩ̀kã̌	ìd͡ʒì	ītā	ĩ̄jẽ̄	ĩ̄tṹ	ìfà	īd͡ʒʷī	īrō	ĩ̄dã̂	īɡʷá
Defoid, Ayere-Ahan	Ayu	ɪdɪ	ahwa /afah	ataar	anaŋaʃ	atuɡen	atɛɛr	ataraŋaʃ (3 ?)	anababoɡ (4 ?)	atuluboɡ (5 ?)	iʃoɡ / ajalaboɡ
Defoid, Yoruboid, Edekiri	Cabe (Ede Cabe)	ɔ̀kɛ̃	mɛ̃́d͡ʒì	mɛ̃́ta	mɛ̃́hɛ̃	mɛ́hú	mɛ̃́fà	méd͡ʒe	mɛ̃́d͡ʒɔ	mɛ̃́sɛ̃́	mɛ̃́wá
Defoid, Yoruboid, Edekiri	Ede Ica (Ica)	ɔkɔ̃	eɟi	ɛta	ɛ̃ɛ̃	ɛwu	ɛfa	ɛɟɛ	ɛɟɔ	ɛsɔ̃	ɛya
Defoid, Yoruboid, Edekiri	Idaca (Ede Idaca)	òbú	méd͡ʒi	mɛ́ta	mírĩ	mɛrú	mɛ́fà	méd͡ʒe	mɛ́d͡ʒɔ	mɛ́sã	maa
Defoid, Yoruboid, Edekiri	Ifè (1)	ɛnɛ́	méèdzì	mɛ́ɛta	mɛ́ɛrɛ̃	mɛ́ɛrú	mɛ́ɛfà	méedze	mɛ́ɛdzɔ	mɛsã́	maá
Defoid, Yoruboid, Edekiri	Ifè (2)	ɛ̀nɛ / ɔ̀kɔ̃̀	méèdzì	mɛ́ɛta	mɛ́ɛrɛ̃	mɛ́ɛrú	mɛ́ɛfà	méedze	mɛ́ɛdzɔ	mɛsã́	maá
Defoid, Yoruboid, Edekiri	Ulukwumi	ɔ̀kɑ̃	mɛ́zì	mɛ́tɑ	mɛ́rɛ̃	mɛ́rú	mɛ́fɑ̀	méze	mɛ́zɔ	mɛ̀hɑ̃́	mɛ́ɡʷɑ́
Defoid, Yoruboid, Edekiri	Yoruba	oókan [oókɔ̃]	eéjì [eéɟì]	ẹẹ́ta [ɛɛ́ta]	ẹẹ́rin [ɛɛ́ɾĩ]	aárùn-ún [aáɾũ̀ṹ]	ẹẹ́fà [ɛɛ́fà]	eéje [eéɟe]	ẹẹ́jọ [ɛɛ́ɟɔ]	ẹẹ́sàn-án [ɛɛ́sɔ̃̀ɔ̃́]	ẹẹ́wàá [ɛɛ́wàá]
Defoid, Yoruboid, Igala	Igala (1)	éɲɛ́ / ǒkâ	èdʒì	ɛ̀ta	ɛ̀lɛ̀	ɛ̀lú	ɛ̀fà	èbʲe	ɛ̀dʒɔ	ɛ̀lá	ɛ̀ɡʷá
Defoid, Yoruboid, Igala	Igala (2)	ínyé̩ [íɲɛ́]	èjì [èdʒì]	ẹ̀tā [ɛ̀tā]	ẹ̀lè̩ [ɛ̀lɛ̀]	è̩lú [ɛ̀lú]	ẹ̀fè̩ [ɛ̀fɛ̀]	ẹ̀biē [èbjiē]	ẹ̀jọ̄ [ɛ̀dʒɔ]	ẹ̀lá [ɛ̀lá]	ẹ̀ɡwá [ɛ̀ɡwá]
Ukaan	Ukaan (Ikaan dialect)	ʃí	wā	tāːs / hrāhr	nāʲ / nā	hrʊ̀ːn / tòːn	hràdá	hránèʃì	nàːnáʲ / nàːná	hráòʃì	òpú *
Edoid, Delta	Degema	ɔβʊ́	iβə́	sáj (ɪsáj)	iní	súwón (ɪsúwón)	jɪ́sa (ɪjɪ́sá)	síjéβə (isíjéβá)	anɪ́ (ɪnʊ́mán)	əsí (ɔβʊ óte mʊ iɡ͡beɲ) (10 -1)	əɡ͡beɲ (iɡ͡béɲ)
Edoid, Delta	Engenni	ávʊ̀	ívà	ɛ́sàà	ínìì	ìsyònì	ɛ̀nyísà	ìsyovà	ɛ̀nʊ̀màní	àvʊ́mó (10 -1)	íɡ͡bèì
Edoid, North-Central, Edo-Esan-Ora	Ẹdo (1)	òwó [òwó] (used only to count)	èvá [èvá]́	èhá [èhá]	èné [ènɛ́]	ìsén [ìsɛ́] or [ìsɛ̃́] ??	èhàn [èhã̀]	ìhírọ̃n [ìhĩɺɔ]̃	èrẹ̀nrẹ̀n [èɺɛ̃ɺɛ̃]	ìhìnrín [ihĩɺĩ]	ìɡ͡bé [ìɡ͡bé]
Edoid, North-Central, Edo-Esan-Ora	Edo (Bini) (2)	ɔ̀k͡pá / òwo (used only to count)	èvá	èhá	ènɛ́	ìsɛ́n	ěhàn	ìhinrɔ̀n	èrɛ̀nrɛ́n	ìhìnrín	ìɡ͡bé
Edoid, North-Central, Edo-Esan-Ora	Emai (Emai-luleha-Ora)	ɔ̀k͡pa	èvà	èéà	èélè	ìíhìɛ̀n	èéhàn	ìhíɔ́n	èɛ́n	ìsín	ìɡ͡bé
Edoid, North-Central, Edo-Esan-Ora	Esan	ɔ̀k͡pá	èvá	éà	énɛ̃̀	ìsɛ̃́	éhã́	ìhĩ́lɔ̃̀	èlɛ̃́lɛ̃̀	ĩ̀sɪ̃́lɪ̃̀	ìɡ͡bé
Edoid, North-Central, Ghotuo-Uneme-Yekhee	Etsako (Yekhee)	ọkpa [ɔk͡pà]	eva [évà]	ela [élà]	ejiẹ [éʒié]	ise [ìsé]	esa [ésà]	isevha [ìsévhà]	eleeh [éːléː]	ithi [ìtií]	iɡbe [ìɡ͡bé]̄
Edoid, North-Central, Ghotuo-Uneme-Yekhee	Ghotuo	ɔ̀k͡pā	èvā	èēsà	èēnè	ìīʒè / ìīʒìè	ìjhēhà / ìēhà jh = a week, vd	ìhīɲã̄	ènhīē nh = n̥ voiceless n ?	ìsī	ìɡ͡bē LM͡L
Edoid, North-Central, Ghotuo-Uneme-Yekhee	Okphela (1)	oɡ͡ɣʷo ˥˩ ˨	evɑ ˨ ˧	esɛ ˧ ˨	ene ˧ ˨	iʃe ˧ ˨	esesa ˨ ˧ ˨	iʃilʷɑ ˨ ˧ ˨	elele ˨ ˩˥ ˨	itili ˨ ˩˥ ˧	iɡ͡be ˨ ˧
Edoid, North-Central, Ghotuo-Uneme-Yekhee	Ivbie-North-Okphele-Arhe (2)	oɣuo	eva	esɛ	ene	iʃie	esesa	iʃilua	elele	itili	iɡ͡be
Edoid, North-Central, Ghotuo-Uneme-Yekhee	Ososo	oɡwo [òɡwò]	eva [èvá]	esa [èsá]	ene [èné]	ichie [ìt͡ʃè]	esesa [èsâsà]	ifuena [ìfwènà]	inyenye [ìɲèɲẽ́]	isini [ìsĩ̀nĩ̀]	iɡbe [ìɡ͡bé]
Edoid, Northwestern, Southern	Okpamheri	ɔkpa	eva	esa	enen	ishe	eaza	izuonua	ɛnien	isie	iɡ͡be
Edoid, Southwestern	Isoko (1)	ɔvʊ	ɪ́vɛ	ɪ́sa	ɪ́nɪ	ɪ́sɔɪ	ɪ́zɪ́za	ɪ́hɾɛ	ɪ́rɪ́ː	ɪ́zɪ́ː	ɪ́kpe
Edoid, Southwestern	Isoko (2)	ọvụ	ịvẹ	ịsạ	ịnị	isoi	ịzịza	ihrẹ	ịrịị	izii	ikpe
Edoid, Southwestern	Urhobo	ɔ̀vò	ǐvɛ̀	ěrà	ɛ̌nè	ǐjòɾĩ̀	ěsã́	ǐɣwɾɛ̃́	ɛ̌ɾéɾẽ	ǐríɾĩ	ǐxwè
Igboid, Ekpeye	Ekpeye	nwùrnér, ŋìnɛ́	ɓɨ̂bɔ́ bh = IPA [ɓ]	ɓɨ́tɔ́ ir = IPA [ɨ]	ɓɨ́nɔ̂ o̠r = IPA [ɔ]	ɓísê	ɓísû	ɓɨ́sábɔ̀	ɓɨ́sátɔ́	ɓɨ́sánɔ̂ or nàzáma or nàzáma ɗi	ɗì dh = IPA [ɗ]
Igboid, Igbo	Igbo (1)	ótù	àbʊ̄ɔ́	àtɔ́	ànɔ́	ìsé	ìsiì	àsáà	àsátɔ́	ìtólú	ìri
Igboid, Igbo	Échiè Igbo (2)	otù	àbʊ̀ɔ́ ~ m̀bʊ̀ɔ̀ ~ nam̀̀	tɔ ~ àtɔ	(ǹ)nɔ ~ ànɔ	se~ ìse	ʃiì ~ ìʃiì	saà ~ àsaà	satɔ̄ ~ àsatɔ̄	totū ~ ìtolū	ìri
Igboid, Igbo	Igbo (3)	otù	àbʊɔ́	àtɔ	ànɔ	ìse	ìsiì	àsaà	àsatɔ́	ìtolú, ̀tolú	ìri
Igboid, Igbo	Ikwere	ótù	ɛ̀bɔ̀	ɛ̀tɔ́	ɛ̀nɔ̂	ìsẽ̂	ìsínù	ɛ̀sâ	ɛ̀sátɔ́	tólú	ǹrí
Oko	Oko (Oko-Eni-Osayen)	ɔ̀ɔ́rɛ / ɔ̀jɛ́rɛ	ɛ̀bɔ̀rɛ̀	ɛ̀ta	ɛ̀na	ùpi	ɔ̀pɔ́nɔ̀ɔ́rɛ (5 + 1) *	úfɔ́mbɔ̀rɛ̀ (5 + 2) *	ɔ̀nɔ́kɔ́nɔkɔ́nɔ	ùbɔ́ɔ̀rɛ̀ (< 'ten is less than one ') *	ɛ̀fɔ
Nupoid, Ebira-Gade	Ebira	ɔ̀ɔ̀nyɪ̄	ɛ̀ɛ̀vā	ɛ̀ɛ̀tá	ɛ̀ɛ̀nà	ɛ̀ɛ̀hɪ́	hɪ̋nɔ̋nyɪ̄ (5+ 1)	hɪ̋m̋bā (5+ 2)	hɪ̋n̋tá (5+ 3)	hɪ̋ǹnà (5+ 4)	ɛ̀ɛ̀wʊ́
Nupoid, Nupe-Gbagyi, Gbagyi-Gbari	Gbari	ɡ͡bᵐaːɾí	ŋʷã̂ba	ŋʷã̂t͡ʃa	ŋʷã̂ɲi	ŋʷã̂tⁿù	tⁿúwĩ (5+ 1)	tⁿâba (5+ 2)	tⁿẫ̂t͡ʃa (5+ 3)	tⁿâɲi (5+ 4)	ŋʷã̂wò
Nupoid, Nupe-Gbagyi, Nupe	Kakanda	ɡúní	ɡúbà	ɡútá	ɡúni	ɡútũ	ɡútuaɲĩ̀ (5+ 1)	ɡútuabà (5+ 2)	ɡútòtá (5+ 3)	ɡútuani (5+ 4)	ɡúwo
Nupoid, Nupe-Gbagyi, Nupe	Nupe	niní	ɡúbà	ɡútá	ɡúni	ɡútsũ	ɡútswàɲĩ (5+ 1)	ɡútwàbà (5+ 2)	ɡútotá (5+ 3)	ɡútwã̀ni (5+ 4)	ɡúwo
Idomoid, Akweya, Eloyi	Eloyi (Afo) (1)	ńɡwònzé	ńɡwòpó	ńɡwòlá	ńɡwòndó	ńɡwolɔ́	ńɡwɔ̀rɛ́nyí	ńɡwòrówó	ńɡwòràndá	ńɡwòròndó	úwó
Idomoid, Akweya, Eloyi	Eloyi (Afo) (2)	ònzé	òpā	ōlá	ōndō	ɔ̄lɔ̀ o̠= ɔ	ōròwò	ɔ̀rɛ̀nyi	ōràndá	òròndō	ūwó
Idomoid, Akweya, Eloyi	Eloyi (3)	ònzé	òpā	ōlá	ōndō	ō̠lò̠	ōròwò	ò̠rɛ̀nyi	ōràndá	òròndō	ūwó
Idomoid, Akweya, Etulo-Idoma, Idoma	Agatu	óyè [ɔ́jè]	ẹ̀pà [ɛ̀pà]	ẹ̀tá [ɛ̀tá]	ẹ̀nẹ̀ [ɛ́nɛ̀]	ẹ̀họ́ [ɛ̀hɔ́]	ẹ̀hílí [ɛ̀hílí]	àhápà [àhápà]	àhàtá [àhàtá]	àhànè [àhànè]	ìɡwó [ìɡwó ]
Idomoid, Akweya, Etulo-Idoma, Idoma	Alago	óje	èpà	èta	ènɛ̀	ɛ̀hɔ	ìhirì	àhapà	àhatá	àhánɛ̀	ìɡʷó
Idomoid, Akweya, Etulo-Idoma, Idoma	Idoma	éyè [éjè]	ẹpà [ɛ́pà]	ẹtá [ɛtá]	ẹhẹ [ɛ́hɛ́]	ẹhọ [ɛ́hɔ]	ẹhili [ɛ́hili]	àhapà [àhapà]	àhátá [àhátá]	àhánẹ [àhánɛ́]	iɡwó [iɡwó ]
Idomoid, Akweya, Etulo-Idoma, Idoma	Igede	óòk͡pók͡póh	îmíìyèh	ītā	īnêh	ērʊ̄ / īrʊ̄	īrʷɔ̀nyɛ̀	īrùyèh	īnêkúh	ìhíkítʃú	īwō
Idomoid, Akweya, Etulo-Idoma, Idoma	Yala	ósè	ɛ̀pà	ɛ̀ta	ɛ̀nɛ̀	èrwɔ	èríwi	àrapà	àratá	àranɛ̀	ìɡwó

== See also ==
- Systematic graphic of the Niger–Congo languages with numbers of speakers
