= Ahan language =

Volta–Niger language of Nigeria

Aahan
- Native to: Nigeria
- Region: Ondo State
- Native speakers: (300 cited 2000)
- Language family: Niger–Congo?: Atlantic–Congo; Volta–Niger; Ayere–Ahan; Aahan

Language codes
- ISO 639-3: ahn
- Glottolog: ahan1244
- ELP: Àhàn

Aahan (Ààhàn) is an endangered divergent Volta–Niger language of Nigeria, closely related only to Ayere. There may be about 2,400 speakers left based on upper estimates (2024). Roger Blench however estimated about 300 speakers left in the year 2000. It is spoken in the village of Ahan-Ayegunle in the Omuo Oke district.

== Distribution ==
According to Ethnologue, Ahan is spoken in:

- Ekiti state: Ekiti East LGA.

== Phonology ==
The phonemic inventory of Ahan is:

=== Consonants ===
	Labial	Dental- Alveolar	Palato- alveolar	Velar	Labio- velar	Glottal
Nasal	m	n	ɲ	ŋ		
Stops	b	t d		k g	kp gb	
Affricate		ts	tʃ dʒ			
Fricative	f	θ s				h
Lateral Approx.		l				
Central Approx.		r	j		w	

=== Vowels ===
	Front	Central	Back
High	i ĩ		u ũ
Mid	e		o
Low	ɛ ɛ̃	ɑ ɑ̃	ɔ ɔ̃
