= Ugbe Akoko =

Town in Ondo State, Nigeria

Coordinates: 7°29′18″N 5°49′23″E

Ugbe Akoko is a town in Ondo State, southwestern Nigeria, about 105 km from the state's capital city Akure. Traditionally, the town has a ruling monarch.
