= Ayere–Ahan languages =

Volta–Niger language branch of Nigeria

Ayere–Ahan
- Geographic distribution: Kogi State and Ondo State, Nigeria
- Linguistic classification: Niger–Congo?: Atlantic–Congo; Volta–Niger; Ayere–Ahan
- Proto-language: Proto-Ayere-Ahan
- Subdivisions: Ayere; Àhàn

Language codes
- Glottolog: ayer1244

The Ayere–Ahan languages are a pair of languages of southwestern Nigeria, Ayere and Àhàn (or Ahaan), that form an independent branch of the Volta–Niger languages. These languages are spoken in the border region of Kogi State and Ondo State, Nigeria.

The ASJP 4.0 classifies the Ayere–Ahan languages as most closely related to the Yoruboid languages.

== Names and locations ==
Below is a list of Ayere–Ahan language names and locations from Blench (2019).

Language	Alternate spellings	Endonym(s)	Location(s)
Ahan		Àhàn	Ondo State, Ekiti LGA, Ajowa, Igashi, and Omou towns
Uwu	Ayere		Kwara State, Oyi LGA, Kabba District

== See also ==
- Ayere-Ahan word lists (Wiktionary)
