= Eloyi language =

Plateau language of Nigeria

Eloyi
- Afu
- Native to: Nigeria
- Region: Benue State, Nassarawa State
- Native speakers: 100,000 (2021)
- Language family: Niger–Congo?: Atlantic–Congo; Benue–Congo; Plateau; Eloyi

Language codes
- ISO 639-3: afo
- Glottolog: eloy1241

Eloyi, or Afu (Afo) or Ajiri, is a Plateau language of uncertain classification. It is spoken by the Eloyi people of Agatu LGA and Otukpo LGA of Benue State and Nassarawa State in Nigeria.

== Classification ==
Armstrong (1955, 1983) classified Eloyi as Idomoid, but that identification was based on a single word list and Armstrong later expressed doubts. Other preliminary accounts classify it as Plateau, and Blench (2008) leaves it as a separate branch of Plateau.

Blench (2007) considers Eloyi to be a divergent Plateau language that has undergone Idomoid influence, rather than vice versa.

== Phonology ==
=== Consonants ===
Consonants
		Bilabial	Labio- dental	Alveolar	Post- alveolar	Palatal	Velar	Labial- velar	Glottal
Plosive	voiceless	p		t			k	k͡p	
Plosive	voiced	b		d			g	g͡b	
Affricate				d͡z		d͡ʒ			
Fricative	voiceless		f	s	ʃ				h
Fricative	voiced		v	z					
Nasal		m		n		ɲ	ŋ		
Rhotic				r/ɾ					
Approximant				l		j		w	

- Muniru et al. (2021) classify /ʃ/ as post-alveolar, but /d͡ʒ/, /ɲ/, and /j/ as palatal.
- Blench (2007) includes two palatal plosives, written ⟨c⟩ and ⟨j⟩, which Muniru et al. (2021) interpret as /t͡ʃ/ and /d͡ʒ/, respectively. However, Muniru et al. do not find /t͡ʃ/ in their wordlists.
- Muniru et al. also place /h/ in the labial-velar column of the table but describe it as a voiceless glottal fricative. Blench (2007) does not include /h/ in the consonant inventory.
- Muniru et al. also found instances of labialization and palatalization.

=== Vowels ===
Vowels
	Front	Central	Back
Close	i		u
Close-mid	e		o
Open-mid	ɛ		ɔ
Open		a	

- Muniru et al. (2021) also found [ø] in [ɾǿwɛ́] 'red', though they state this may be due to the following [w]. They also mention that there may be five tones: low, mid, high, rising-falling, and falling-rising.
