= Ukaan language =

Proposed Branch of the Volta-Niger Languages

Ukaan
- Ikan
- Native to: Nigeria
- Region: Ondo State, Edo State
- Native speakers: (18,000 cited 1973)
- Language family: Niger–Congo?: Atlantic–Congo; Benue–Congo ?; Ukaan
- Dialects: Ukaan proper; Igau; Ayegbe (Iisheu); Iinno (Iyinno)

Language codes
- ISO 639-3: kcf
- Glottolog: ukaa1243

Ukaan (also Ikan, Anyaran, Auga, or Kakumo) is a poorly described Niger–Congo language or dialect cluster of uncertain affiliation. Roger Blench suspects, based on wordlists, that it might be closest to the (East) Benue–Congo languages (or, equivalently, the most divergent of the Benue–Congo languages). Blench (2012) states that "noun-classes and concord make it look Benue-Congo, but evidence is weak."

Speakers refer to their language as Ùkãã or Ìkã.

== Varieties ==
A native speaker of Ukaan from Ikakumo

The name Anyaran is from the town of Anyaran, where it is spoken. Ukaan has several divergent dialects: Ukaan proper, Igau, Ayegbe (Iisheu), Iinno (Iyinno), which only have one-way intelligibility in some cases.

Roger Blench (2005, 2019) considers Ukaan to consist of at least 3 different languages, and notes that Ukaan varieties spoken in Ìshè,̣ Ẹkakumọ, and Auga all have different lexemes.

Salffner (2009: 27) lists the following four dialects of Ukaan.

- Ikaan: spoken in Ikakumo (Edo State)
- Ayegbe: spoken in Ise
- Iigau or Iigao: spoken in Auga
- Iino: spoken in Ayanran

== Distribution ==
Ethnologue lists the following locations where Ukaan is spoken.

- Ondo State: Akoko North-East LGA
- Edo State: Akoko Edo LGA
- Kogi State: Ijumu LGA

Blench (2019) lists Ondo State, Akoko North LGA, towns of Kakumo–Aworo (Kakumo–Kejĩ, Auga and Iṣe); Edo State, Akoko Edo LGA, towns of Kakumo–Akoko and Anyaran.

== Reconstruction ==
Proto-Ukaan has been reconstructed by Abiodun (1999).

== See also ==
- List of Proto-Ukaan reconstructions (Wiktionary)
