= Idomoid languages =

Atlantic–Congo language group of Nigeria

Idomoid
- Geographic distribution: Central Nigeria, lower reaches of the Benue River
- Linguistic classification: Niger–Congo?: Atlantic–Congo; Volta–Niger; noi; Idomoid
- Subdivisions: Yace; Etulo–Idoma

Language codes
- Glottolog: idom1262

The Idomoid languages are spoken primarily in Benue State of east-central Nigeria and surrounding regions. Idoma itself is an official language spoken by nearly four million people including the subgroups of Igede, Uffia, Otukpo, and Orokam.

== Languages ==
- Idomoid
  - Yace
  - Akpa
  - Etulo–Idoma
    - Etulo
    - Idoma
      - Idoma
      - Igede
      - Agatu
      - Alago
      - Yala

Ethnologue includes Eloyi, though that assignment is outdated as Blench (2007) considers Eloyi to be a divergent Plateau language that has undergone Idomoid influence, rather than vice versa.

Ethnologue also calls the non-Yace branch "Akweya", despite the fact that Yace are also called "Akweya".

== Names and locations ==
Below is a list of language names, populations, and locations from Blench (2019).

Language	Branch	Cluster	Dialects	Alternate spellings	Own name for language	Endonym(s)	Other names (location-based)	Other names for language	Exonym(s)	Speakers	Location(s)
Igede			Three dialects: Òjù (Central), Ìtóò (Ito), Ùẉ ọò`kwù ̣(Worku); also Gabu (Ogoja LGA)	Igedde, Egede, Egedde						70,000 (1952 RGA), 120,000 (1982 UBS)	Benue State, Oju, Otukpo and Okpokwu LGAs; Cross River State, Ogoja LGA
Yace			Alifokpa, Ijiegu	Yache, Yatye, Iyace		Ekpari?				6,600 (1937 RGA); 10,000 (1982 UBS)	Cross River State, Ogoja LGA
Akpa								Akweya		5,500 (1952 RGA)	Benue State, Otukpo LGA
Eloyi			Mbeci (=Mbekyi, Mbejĩ, Mbamu)					Afo, Epe, Aho, Afu, Afao		20,000 (Mackay 1964); 25,000 (SIL)	Nasarawa State, Nasarawa and Awe LGAs; Benue State, Otukpo LGA
Alago	Group B		Agwatashi, Assaikio, Doma, Keana in towns of these names	Alago		Idoma Nokwu				15,000 (1953 RGA); at least 100,000 (Blench 2017)	Nasarawa State, Awe and Lafia LGAs
Etulo	Group B			Utur, Eturo					Turumawa	2,900 (1952 RGA); more than 10,000 (Shain, p.c. 1988)	Benue State, Gboko LGA, Taraba State, Wukari, LGA
Yala		Yala				Iyala				25,650 (1952); 50,000 (1973 SIL)	
Yala Ikom		Yala		Nkum							Cross River State, Ikom LGA
Yala Obubra		Yala					Nkum Akpambe				Cross River State, Obubra LGA
Yala Ogoja		Yala	Yala Ọkpọ̃ma (Central Yala) spoken in all hamlets comprising Ọkpọ̃ma village; Yala Igbeeku spoken between Igbeeku Rikọ and Oloko; Yala Ọkpamẹ, spoken in Ọkkpamẹ, Yẹhẹ and Ebo.								Cross River State, Ogoja LGA
Idoma cluster		Idoma									Benue State, Otukpo, Apa and Okpokwu LGAs; Nasarawa State, Nasarawa and Awe LGAs
Agatu		Idoma	Agatu, Ochekwu				Idoma North			56,000 (1952 RGA); 70,000 (1987 UBS)	Benue State, Apa LGA Otukpo LGA; Nasarawa State, Nasarawa and Awe LGAs
Idoma Central		Idoma					Oturkpo, Otukpo	Akpoto		66,000 (1952 RGA)	Benue State, Otukpo, Apa and Okpokwu LGAs
Idoma West		Idoma								60,000 (1952 RGA)	Benue State, Okpokwu LGA
Okpogu		Idoma									
Idoma South		Idoma					Igumale, Igwaale, Ijigbam			13,500 (1952 RGA)	Benue State, Okpokwu LGA

== See also ==
- List of Proto-Idomoid reconstructions (Wiktionary)
