= Islam in Bayelsa State =

Regions with significant populations
- Yenagoa

Religions
- Islam

Languages
- Ebira • English (Nigerian, Pidgin) • Hausa • Igbo • Nupe • Yoruba

Islam is a minority religion in Bayelsa State. Christianity is the dominant religion across Bayelsa State, but Islam has historical presence in the state dating to settlement of migrant traders from northern Nigeria in the late twentieth century along with conversions around state creation in 1996. Non-indigene migrants and their descendents form the majority of the Bayelsa Muslim community, vastly outnumbering the under one hundred indigenous Muslims.

Unlike other areas, there have not been recorded instances of religiously motivated physical conflict between Christians and Muslims in Bayelsa, although competition for religious dominance remains a persistent undercurrent of Bayelsa interreligious relations.

== History ==
=== Before statehood ===
Before the creation of Bayelsa State, the territory that would become the state was part of Rivers State and was home to a very small number of Muslims — less than 200 Muslims were counted in the 1952 and 1963 censuses. The challenging riverine environment and poor transportation infrastructure of the area historically deterred Muslim migrant traders from permanent settlement.

However, seasonal migration and eventual permanent relocation to now-Bayelsa by Muslim traders started in Yenagoa by the 1980s. In a 2009 interview, the Sarkin Hausa of Bayelsa — Sokoto State native Badamasi Salikum — reported that Hausa Muslim migrants had been living in the area since 1980 but initially "prayed in their houses" and made no concerted proselytization efforts. As there was no mosque in Bayelsa before statehood, Muslims who sought to pray at a mosque would travel to Ahoada in now-Rivers State to observe Friday prayers.

Three Bayelsa indigenes were identified as Muslim converts before the state creation: Abdurrahman Eneware, Mohammed Aggrey, and Barnabas Ciroma. All would become Muslim community leaders after statehood.

=== State creation period ===
The creation of Bayelsa State on 1 October 1996 was a watershed moment in the history of Islam in the area. Within weeks of statehood, Aggrey and Ciroma returned to Yenagoa from Rivers State alongside two Muslim Rivers State indigene women to establish an organised Muslim community. Aggrey, a businessman and politician, would become the first Bayelsa State vice president of the Nigerian Supreme Council for Islamic Affairs. Ciroma, an undergraduate student at the Rivers State University of Science and Technology, became the first secretary of the state NSCIA chapter.

[State NSCIA organisers] had a contact here that brought them to my store. I had a multi-purpose store then and people used to come there...They also went from house to house to talk to people. I was a resource person to them and through me they met many people...We were up to thirty that converted the first day. Others joined in subsequent days.

— community leader Isa Ogbotobo on the 1996 conversions, interview by Egodi Uchendu in May 2009

The urgency of the effort was strategic according to scholar Egodi Uchendu as having a recognised indigenous Muslim community would enable the wider Muslim community easier access to funding, political representation, and state government structures, particularly the State Pilgrims' Welfare Board. The nascent NSCIA organisers sought indigenous converts in the weeks following statehood, eventually gathering thirty converts including future Muslim community leader Isa Ogbotobo.

These initial conversions were partly driven by social and economic motivations. Some Bayelsans were open to promises that conversion to Islam would provide pathways out of poverty, social prestige, and opportunities for travel — in particular to Mecca for the hajj — with one resident saying "I was told a few years back, by some of my friends, that if I become a Muslim I will have the opportunity of going to Mecca and become an Alhaji, that Alhajis are known for their wealth and respected by their fellow Muslims."

In 1996 and 1997, the state chapter of the NSCIA was formally organised and registered as the community pooled contributions to build the first mosque in Ovom, Yenagoa. An Igbo Muslim scholar trained in Saudi Arabia, Ustaz Abusufyan Uche, was dispatched in 1996 by the Islamic Centre in Afikpo to serve as the Islamic teacher for the new converts and as the state's chief imam, a position he held for nearly a decade. His presence encouraged further migration of Igbo and other non-Hausa Muslims into the state.

=== Twenty-first century ===
During the early 2000s, the community experienced notable growth, particularly among indigene youths aged 18 to 35. A significant catalyst was the public visibility of Mujahid Dokubo-Asari, the Rivers State-born Muslim leader of the Niger Delta People's Volunteer Force militant group. The high profile of Dokubo-Asari, who had converted to Islam in the late 1980s or early 1990s, as a militant Ijaw leader and his explicit identification as a Muslim made a strong impression on Bayelsan Ijaw youth, some of whom converted as a result of his influence according to then-chief imam Abusufyan Uche. A further conversion pathway involved Bayelsan students who encountered Islam during study in northern Nigeria.

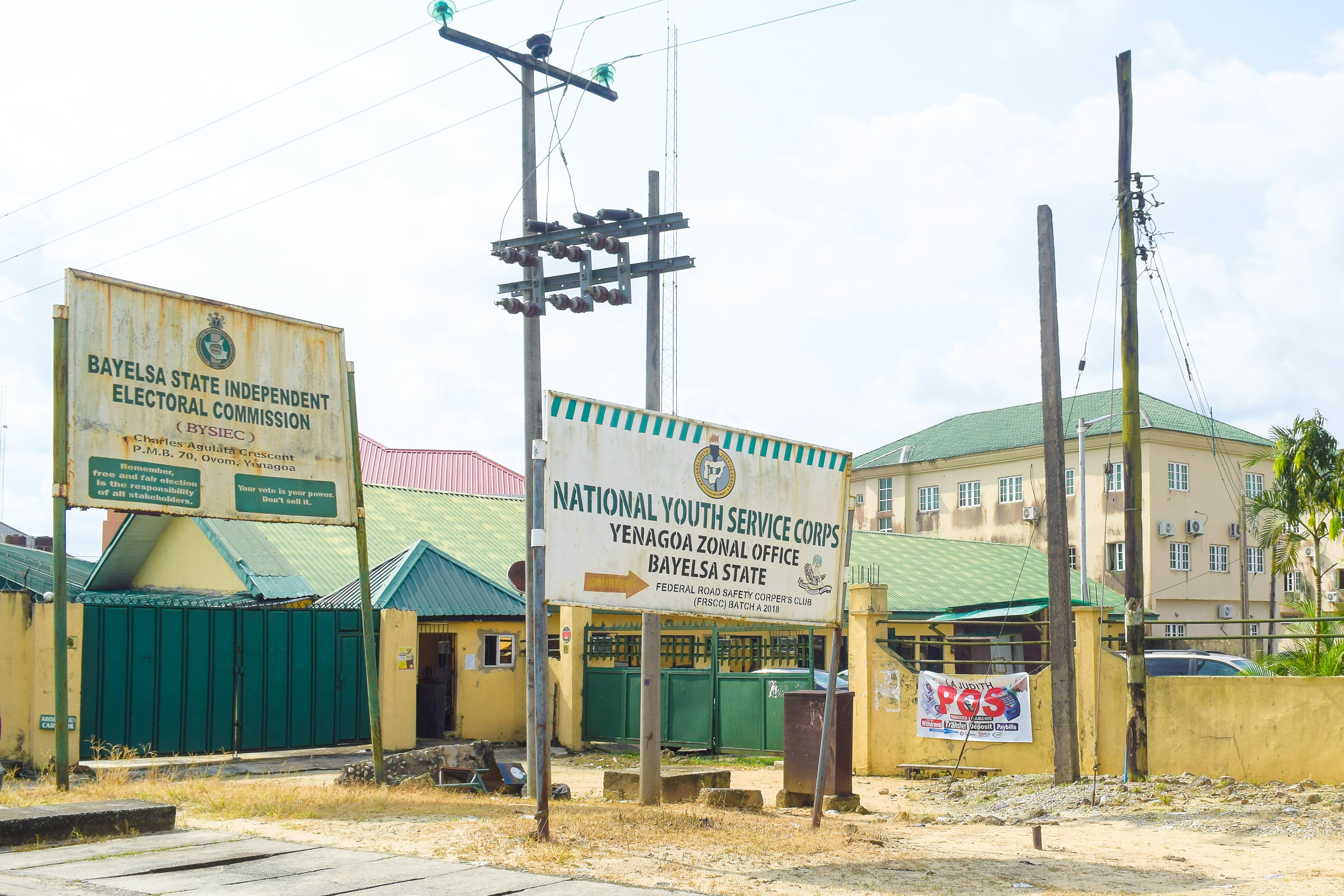
National Youth Service Corps state headquarters in Yenagoa

In the mid-2000s, Zakari Alawie, a Muslim Bayelsa indigene raised in Cameroon, was found to be living in Port Harcourt. On the invitation of the local Muslim community, he relocated to Yenagoa in 2006 and succeeded Abusufyan Uche as chief imam. Around the same time, Muslim corpers also played a role in growing the community. The state chapter of the Muslim Corpers Association of Nigeria, established in 1997, became an important institutional presence in the community. To support Muslim corps members posted to the state — many of whom initially sought redeployment due to unfamiliarity with Bayelsa — the chapter built a dedicated lodge in Okaka, Yenagoa, completed in 2006 using funds pooled from individual corpers and donor Muslim groups. MCAN members carried out proselytisation through both city and rural da'wah programmes. City activities included Qur'anic study sessions, pre-Friday sermon (khutbah) delivery at the Ekeki Central Mosque, and Islamic classes for converts and Muslim children. Rural outreach extended to riverine communities across the state — including Amassoma, Nembe, Ogbia, Okolobiri, Otuoke, and Sagbama — where MCAN members delivered lectures and presented gifts to new converts. MCAN members' fluency and literacy in English gave them a communicative advantage over Hausa-speaking preachers when engaging with Bayelsa's predominantly English and Pidgin-speaking population. Some Muslim corps members opt to remain in the state upon completion of their service, often to continue proselytisation.

The indigenous Muslim population climbed from less than five in 1996 to approximately one hundred by 2009. A significant setback occurred in 2013 with the death of Isa Ogbotobo, who had been the indigenous Muslim community's principal negotiator and a charismatic community leader. Uchendu observed his death as having a destabilising impact on community cohesion. By 2016, Muslim leaders reported that the number of indigenous converts had fallen back below a hundred, as some early converts had left the faith. The non-indigene migrant communities continue to dominate the overall Muslim population.

The internal disruption of Ogbotobo's death was compounded by two more issues during the 2010s — hostility amid the Boko Haram insurgency and the kidnapping of Ese Oruru, a nationally significant controversy that tested interfaith relations in the state. In August 2015, Yunusa Dahiru — a Kano-born tricycle operator resident in Yenagoa — abducted thirteen-year-old Ese Oruru from her mother's shop and transported her to Kano State, where she was forcibly converted to Islam, renamed, and married. The case drew intense national attention; Oruru was rescued in February 2016 while Dahiru was arraigned before the Federal High Court in Yenagoa in March 2016 and eventually sentenced to 26 years imprisonment. The incident was described as an event that dented interfaith relations in Bayelsa. Although the crime did not implicate other members of the Muslim community, it generated broader suspicion of the Muslim population. Nevertheless, Muslim organisations in Bayelsa continued to collaborate with the Christian groups to maintain harmonious interfaith relations throughout this period.

By the 2020s, the community continues to engage with the state government and other communities. During the Ramadan period, state officials host iftars with Muslim leaders in Yenagoa while fielding community requests for financial and material support. At the same time, the community faced internal disputes over the Bayelsa NSCIA chapter, culminating in a court battle over leadership positions in 2026 following disagreements over tenure, governance, and allegations of state government interference.

== Demographics ==
Religious groups in Brass Division (now-Bayelsa State)
Religious group	1952		1963	
Religious group	Pop.	%	Pop.	%
Christianity	57,535	45.32%	245,297	79.2%
Islam	178	0.14%	116	0.04%
Others	69,241	54.54%	64,302	20.76%
Total population	126,954	100%	309,715	100%

Nigeria does not currently publish religious census data, as the last census effort to include religion took place in 1973 and its results were not published. Prior to 1973, religious figures in the controversial 1952 and 1963 censuses put the Muslim population of now-Bayelsa at 178 (0.14%) and 116 (0.04%), respectively. Precise updated figures for the Muslim population of Bayelsa State are not available.

Within the Bayelsa Muslim population, the community is divided between indigenous Ijaw converts and migrant Muslim communities from other parts of Nigeria. The migrant portion comprises the vast majority of the population, with ethnic Ebira, Hausa, Igbo, Nupe, and Yoruba Muslim community members. Igbo Muslims in particular are described as "very affluent" and wielding considerable influence within the community. The smaller group of Muslim indigenes, largely ethnically Ijaw, matches the broader pattern in other parts of the South-South where non-indigenes make up the bulk of the Muslim community. The wider Muslim community is fragmented on ethnic lines as Hausa, Igbo, and other non-indigene Muslims tend to worship together while Yoruba and indigenous Ijaw Muslims maintain separate mosques. As of 2017, the ethnic identity of the presiding imam at each of the four principal mosques in Yenagoa reflects the ethnic group that dominates that mosque.

=== Women ===
Women constitute a small fraction of indigenous Muslim converts in Bayelsa. As in other Niger Delta states, the majority of female Muslims in the state became Muslim through marriage to Muslim men, and many return to their former religions after the end of their marriages or the death of Muslim husbands. As of 2017, a single woman in Bayelsa State — Zainab Saba — was noted as a convert whose conversion was not predicated on marriage. The NSCIA state chapter includes a women's wing, which engages in welfare activities for Muslim women in the state. The Bayelsa State Legal Adviser on Islamic Affairs, Bilkisu Odoko, has publicly called on the state government to include Muslim women in skills acquisition programmes and increased political representation.

== Pilgrimage ==
The state pilgrims' board administers the allocation of hajj slots and state government grants for the annual pilgrimage to Mecca. Access to a state-level pilgrims' board has been a central institutional objective of the Bayelsa Muslim community since state creation, as having an organised community registered under the NSCIA was a prerequisite for accessing state government resources for Muslim affairs. The promise of hajj — and the social prestige of the title "Alhaji" — was itself a significant motivator in some early conversions. Some converts also used the hajj as a migration opportunity, attempting to emigrate through Saudi Arabia.

The first attempt to sponsor Bayelsa Muslims to Mecca, under military administrator Omoniyi Caleb Olubolade, failed. The first successful pilgrimage was organised during the governorship of Diepreye Alamieyeseigha, with a contingent of forty pilgrims. Subsequent administrations under Goodluck Jonathan, Timipre Sylva, Henry Seriake Dickson, and Douye Diri maintained the sponsorship policy.

By the 2020s, the state government's support included the regular sponsorship of Muslim pilgrimages. The community has requested additional Muslim representation among board staff. However, the draw of the hajj has also made Bayelsa Muslims targets for fraud. Fake officials purporting to represent the State Pilgrims' Welfare Board have solicited payments from prospective pilgrims, in some cases collecting fees without providing any pilgrimage services. This pattern is part of a wider phenomenon of hajj-related fraud that the National Hajj Commission has repeatedly warned against.

== See also ==
- Islam in Akwa Ibom State
- Islam in Nigeria
- Mujahid Dokubo-Asari
