= FUO =

FUO may refer to:

- Fuo, Ghana, a suburb of Tamale
- Federal University, Otuoke, in Nigeria
- Fever of unknown origin
- Foshan Shadi Airport in Guangdong Province, China
