= Epie-Atissa =

Epie-Atissa may refer to:

- the Epie-Atissa people
- the Epie-Atissa language
