= Seth Accra Jaja =

Nigerian academic

2nd Vice-Chancellor of Federal University, Otuoke
- In office 2016–2020
- Succeeded by: Teddy Charles Adias

Personal details
- Born: Seth Accra Jaja
- Profession: Academics

Seth Accra Jaja is a Professor of Management Science and a distinguished Nigerian academic. He was appointed as the 2nd vice-chancellor of the Federal University, Otuoke, Bayelsa State, Nigeria by the Federal Government of Nigeria in 2016 succeeding Bolaji Aluko.

He was the Returning Officer of Independent National Electoral Commission (INEC) in Delta State for the 2019 General Elections in Nigeria.
