= Teddy Charles Adias =

Nigerian Professor of haemotology and VC

3rd Vice-Chancellor of Federal University, Otuoke
- Incumbent
- Assumed office 2021
- Preceded by: Seth Accra-Jaja

Personal details
- Born: Teddy Charles Adias
- Profession: academic

Teddy Charles Adias is a Nigerian professor of Hematology and the Vice-Chancellor of Federal University, Otuoke. Bayelsa State, Nigeria In 2023, he was the collation officer for Rivers State appointed by Independent National Electoral Commission for the Presidential election in Nigeria.

== Career ==
He is a Professor of Haematology, he was once the Deputy Vice-Chancellor of Federal University, Otuoke and the former Provost of the Bayelsa College of Health Technology. He was appointed Vice-Chancellor of the Federal University, Otuoke by the federal government of Nigeria after the tenure of his predecessor, Seth Accra-Jaja ended.

== Controversy ==
In 2023, Teddy suspended the collation of result in River state following the threat to him and his family over alleged rigging of the Presidential election in the state, according to news outlets, his private phone number, his pictures and that of his families circulated social media which further incite threats leading to the suspension of the result in the state after collating result in 21 out of 23 states in the local government of areas of the state.
