= Engenni =

Engenni may be,

- Engenni people
- Engenni language
