= Content Tower =

Tower in Yenagoa, Nigeria

General information
- Location: Yenagoa, Nigeria
- Construction started: 2015
- Completed: 13 August 2020

Content Tower is a seventeen-story building located in Yenagoa, Bayelsa state, Nigeria. The tower construction started in the year 2015 and Megastar Technical and Construction Company (MTCC) was the contractor of the project. The tower building was commissioned by former president of Nigeria, President Muhammadu Buhari on 13 August 2020 through virtual inauguration. The Nigerian Content Development & Monitoring Board (NDCMB), which is in charge of implementing the local content development strategy for Nigeria's oil and gas industry in accordance with the Nigerian Oil and Gas Industry Content Development (NOGICD) Act (2010), has its headquarters in the tower building.

The building housed Elebele's 10 megawatt gas-fired Independent Power Plant, a four-level parking structure, and a 1000-seat auditorium.
