= Emadike Shoreline project =

The Emadike Shoreline project is an ecological intervention effort of the Federal Government of Nigeria to address the coastal and flooding challenges at Emadike and Epebu communities in the Ogbia Local Government Area of Bayelsa State, Nigeria. The project, which was executed through the Ecological Project Office of the Federal Government of Nigeria, involved an 850m shoreline protection with the use of sheet pile method to address ocean surge, while also sand filling up to 16 hectares of land as a reclamation strategy to arrest flood erosion in the community.

== History of the Project ==
The Emadike Shoreline project was awarded in 2022 under the President Muhammadu Buhari administration of the Federal Government of Nigeria. The project was awarded to help address the perennial flooding issues facing the communities over the years.
