= Epie–Atissa people =

The Epie and Atissa are two Nations that live along Epie Creek, northeast of Yenagoa, Bayelsa State, Nigeria. Together, they are commonly known as the Epie-Atissa. The influx of the Engenni migrants to the present location of Epie-Atissa led to its expansion. The Engenni people belong to the Edoid group who share cultural similarity with the Ijaw and the Engenni.

Epie-Atissa settlements include:

- Agudama-Epie,
- Akenpai,
- Okutukutu,
- Onopa,
- Igbogene,
- Kpansia,
- Ogu,
- Edepie,
- Yenaka,
- Opolo,
- Swali,
- Ikolo,
- Akenfa,
- Yenagoa,
- Biogbolo
- Famgbe.

They speak the Epie language.

== History ==
The Epie and Atissa remain as two separate nations. The Epie have villages that run from Igbogene to Amarata; namely,

- Igbogene,
- Yenegwe,
- Akenfa,
- Agudama Epie,
- Akenpai,
- Edepie,
- Okutukutu,
- Opolo,
- Biogbolo,
- Yenizue Gene,
- Kpansia,
- Yenizue Epie,
- Okaka,
- Ekeki,
- Azikoro,
- and Amarata.

While the Atissa have villages running from Onopa, to Agbura; namely,

- Onopa,
- Ovom,
- Yenagoa,
- Bebelebiri,
- Yenaka,
- Ikolo,
- Famgbe,
- Obogoro,
- Akaba,
- Ogu,
- Swali,
- and Agbura.

The Epie language is recorded sometime in the 1970s to have had about 12,000 speakers spread from Igbogene to Amarata, but within the last 30 years, the numbers of living speakers have greatly reduced. Though there is no current record of the numbers of speakers, the Epie language is not spared from the global epidemic that has befallen most of the world's rare, dying languages. The lack of teaching and learning of the Epie language have contributed greatly to the decline in the numbers of native speakers.

Westernisation is another major contributor to the decline of the language. This eradication of language is not uncommonly seen in many other countries around the world.

For example, the traditional chiefs and elders of council are very young men and women, some of them in their 20's. These young people have lost touch of the basic cultural heritage and are hence not capable of transferring it to the younger generations. Many cultural aspects of the Epie-Atissa people have been lost, mainly due to the loss of traditional culture in favor of Western ideals. The Epie-Atissa kingdom has been the eye-base of business in Bayelsa state. The largest public local market, situated at Swali in the Atissa clan, has been very resourceful to the people of the Niger Delta region of Nigeria.

Akenfa, one of the most important cities in the kingdom, it is approximately 4km², making it the third largest community in the kingdom by area. Akenfa is currently ruled by a locally elected chief, Saiyah, who has ruled the community for approximately 12 years. According to the traditions of the Epie-Atissa kingdom, a chief will only be elected if the active chief is dead, and buried for three months. The people of Akenfa have deviated from formal tradition and made the kingship an elected position around the year 2000. A new chief is elected after every four years. The Akenfa community is known to have the largest youth population in the kingdom, and these youth are known to be the pillars of the community. The youth are led by a locally elected official known as the Youth-President. This Youth-President is formally responsible for the youth's welfare and he makes the decisions for the youth. Another role of the youth president is to represent the community in youth affairs, the currently elected youth president is Mr. Mandi. Another recognized leader of the community is the Community Development Committee chairman (CDC), which is also locally elected, the current CDC chairman is Mr. John O. Osomu. The major role of the CDC chairman is to be in charge of all developments coming to the community.

The Yenagoa community in the Epie-Atissa clan is the capital of Bayelsa State, and the chief of the Yenagoa community is known as HRH M.A Clarkson Kikile Oguo V, Ebeni-Eken of Yenagoa.

== Significant events ==
- 23 July 2007: Two expatriates working for MTN Nigeria Limited in Akenfa-Epie, a village outside of Yenagoa, were abducted by gunmen. and a child was found in the Epie creek 2 days after the gunmen killed the teacher, and some students.
- Early November 2013: the youths of Akenfa-Epie were attacked in the forest by the neighboring community; Agudama-Epie. One died, many were injured, and one went missing.
- The people of Epie/Atissa Kingdom have given their advanced reasons for supporting the governorship candidate of the All progressives Congress, APC.
