= Ihuarulam Uche =

Nigerian footballer

Personal information
- Full name: Ihuarulam Uche
- Date of birth: 19 June 1996 (age 30)
- Place of birth: Yenagoa, Bayelsa State, Nigeria
- Height: 1.78 m (5 ft 10 in)
- Position: Forward

Team information
- Current team: Sunshine Stars F.C.
- Number: 15

Senior career*
Years	Team	Apps	(Gls)
2012–2014	Bayelsa United F.C.	26	(12)
2014–2015	Lobi Stars	12	(6)
2015-2018	Abia Warriors	32	(13)
2018	El Dakhleya	2	(0)
2018-2019	Ghazl El Mahalla	2	(13)
2019-2020	Ifeanyi Ubah F.C.	13	(5)
2020-	Sunshine Stars F.C.	9	(4)
- * Club domestic league appearances and goals as of 26 March 2020 (UTC)

Ihuarulam Uche (born 19 June 1996) is a Nigerian professional footballer who plays as a forward for Nigerian Professional Football League club Sunshine Stars F.C.

== Club career ==
=== In Nigeria ===
Ihuarulam started his professional career at Bayelsa United F.C. He played two seasons, before moving to Lobi Stars in July 2014. Uche joined Abia Warriors in 2015.

=== In Egypt ===
Three years at Abia Warriors, on 1 January 2018, Uche joined Egyptian club El Dakhleya on one-year contract.

=== Ghazl El Mahalla ===
In July 2018, Uche joined Egyptian Premier League club Ghazl El Mahalla.

=== Ifeanyi Ubah FC ===
Ihuarulam penned a one-year deal with Ifeanyi Ubah F.C. from El Mahalla in February 2019.

=== Sunshine ===
After a successful spell with Ifeanyi Ubah F.C., Ihuarulam joined Sunshine Stars F.C. in 2020.
