= Federal Medical Centre, Yenagoa =

Federal Medical Centre in Nigeria

Geography
- Location: Yenagoa, Bayelsa State, Nigeria

Links
- Website: fmcyenagoa.org.ng
- Lists: Hospitals in Nigeria

Federal Medical Centre, Yenagoa is a federal government of Nigeria medical centre located in Yenagoa, Bayelsa State, Nigeria. The current chief medical director is James Omietimi.

== History ==
Federal Medical Centre, Yenagoa was established in 1957. The hospital was formerly known as General Hospital, Yenagoa.
