= Eruani Azibapu Godbless =

Nigerian businessman and politician

Dr Eruani Azibapu Godbless CFR
- Born: 25 December 1973 (age 52); Emadike Village, Ogbia LGA, Bayelsa State, Nigeria
- Education: University of Port Harcourt
- Occupations: Group president/CEO, Azikel Group
- Parents: HRH Chief Allwell Eruani (the Obanema of Emadike, Aguda the IX) (father); Rachel Eruani (mother)
- Relatives: HRH Chief (Engr) Okori Christopher Obana, (Ekpor-na-mobiozoh IV) (Uncle)
- Awards: Commander of the Order of the Federal Republic (CFR)

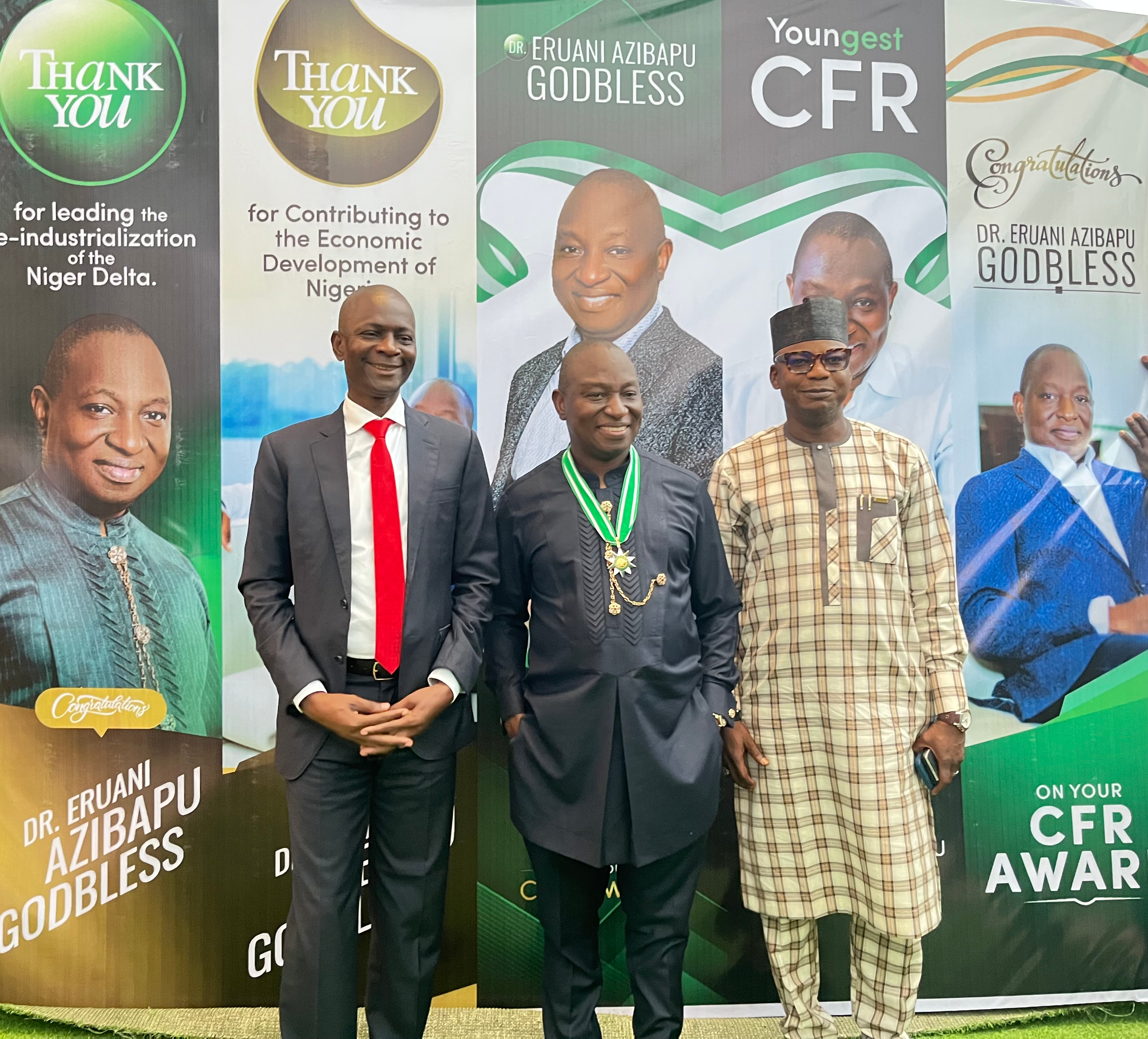
Azibapu Godbless, (centre) pictured in 2022

Eruani Azibapu Godbless (CFR) (born 25 December 1973) is a Nigerian businessman and owner of Azikel Group. He also serves as a member of the advisory board of University of Port Harcourt Foundation.

== Early life and education ==
Azibapu was born on 25 December 1973, in Ogbia LGA of Bayelsa State, to the royal family of Chief Allwell Eruani, (the Obanema of Emadike, Aguda the IX) and Mrs Rachael Eruani. He spent his early life in Epebu, Emadike and then Port Harcourt, where he attended Kumoni Secondary School while spending time with his uncle, Chief (Engr) Okori Obana Christopher. He graduated as a medical doctor from the University of Port Harcourt, with postgraduate studies in Surgery and later Family Medicine. Eruani is a member of the American Academy of Family Physicians. In a quest of entrepreneurial knowledge, Eruani obtained certification in the Owner Management Programme at the Lagos Business School, Senior Executive Programme at the London Business School and the Advance Management Programme at the Wharton Business School, University of Pennsylvania. Eruani has attended several courses in advancement of his knowledge in the Energy and Petroleum sectors. These include "Process, Plant Start-Up Operations for Refinery and Petrochemical" by PTS Inc USA, "Effective Project Management for the Power Project Professional" and "Power Project Finance" by Powergen – USA, the "Global Customer Summit" by GE at CrotonVille – USA, and "Understanding and Structuring Power Purchase Agreement" by INFOCUS – Dubai.

== Career ==
A medical doctor by training, Azibapu practiced his early medical career with the Westend Clinic and Ashford & Patrick Hospital. He later entered into public service with the Bayelsa State Civil Service as a Medical Officer in the Ministry of Health and subsequently, a professional industrial medical practice career in Nigerian Agip Oil Company.

After serving in the oil and gas Industry, Godbless became Chief Physician to Chief Melford Okilo, the first civilian governor of Rivers State.This is not true as he would only have been 20 years old at the end of Okilo's term in office, barely started a medical degree at the time. He was later appointed as a special adviser on HIV/AIDS and community health in the Goodluck Jonathan administration, during the time he was governor of Bayelsa State. Azibapu was assigned an additional role to supervise as the chairman of the State Action Committee on AIDS (SACA). He later served as the commissioner for health in Bayelsa State.

Azibapu is the founder of Azikel Group, a conglomerate made up of companies in the business of dredging, petroleum refining, power generation, aviation, construction and engineering.

== Skills ==
Eruani is a medical doctor who developed special skills in medicine, business and aviation.

Eruani obtained his private pilot licence in aviation in the United States of America. He owns at least three private jets/aircraft, ranging from helicopter to fixed wings. He owned his first private jet at the age of 36, a Hawker 800XP, then acquired a helicopter, Augusta Westland 109S Grand in 2012. In July 2015 Eruani acquired and took delivery of another new aircraft with extended range the Gulfstream 450, to enhance transcontinental businesses.

== Businesses ==
In 2008, Eruani founded the Azikel Group in response to the need for job creation, wealth generation, financial independence, and economic sustainability. This conglomerate encompasses various businesses, including sand-aggregate mining, dredging, logistics and air charter services, power generation, and petroleum. The Azikel Group comprises several subsidiaries: Azikel Dredging, Azikel Air, Azikel Power, and Azikel Petroleum.

=== Petroleum ===
Azikel Petroleum Ltd leads the way with the Azikel Refinery, Nigeria's first private hydroskimming refinery. In October 2024, Bayelsa State governor senator Douye Diri praised Azibapu Eruani, the president of the Azikel Group, for breaking new ground by establishing the Azikel Modular Refinery, the state's first crude oil industry. This commendation came during Senator Diri's inaugural visit to the refinery complex in Obunagha, Yenagoa Local Government Area. He noted that the refinery has significantly contributed to the state's industrialization efforts and aligns with the aspirations of its founding fathers.

=== Air services ===
Azikel Air provides both scheduled and chartered passenger flights within Nigeria and internationally. The company holds an Air Transport License and an Air Operating Certificate, enabling it to operate both helicopters and fixed-wing aircraft.

=== Power generation ===
Azikel Power is authorized for on-grid power generation of 500MW. Its initial phase utilizes efficient, low-emission, open-cycle gas turbines fueled by heavy oils and residuals from the refinery process.

== Awards and honours ==
Eruani was nominated for an Award of Excellence by the US consulate in 2018.

On 20 August 2018, Eruani received the honour of Business Excellency, Innovation and International Partnership at the US consul in Lagos. The award was presented by US consul-general, F. John Bray, accompanied by the US head of Commercial, Brent Omadhl.

The consul-general Bray said this award and recognition, conferred on Eruani is in the advancement of societal growth and development by putting in wheels of industries in motion. The US consulate applauded Eruani for the achievement and progress of the Azikel Refinery, the first private hydroskimming refinery in Nigeria, which will create a multiplier business chain for Nigeria, sustainable wealth, which is a key index of a healthy industrial economy. Eruani has made great success in dredging and aviation. His innovative style and partnership with international organisations is the key to sustainable business development.

In October 2022, a Nigerian national honour of Commander of the Order of the Federal Republic (CFR) was conferred on him by President Muhammadu Buhari.
