= Engenni people =

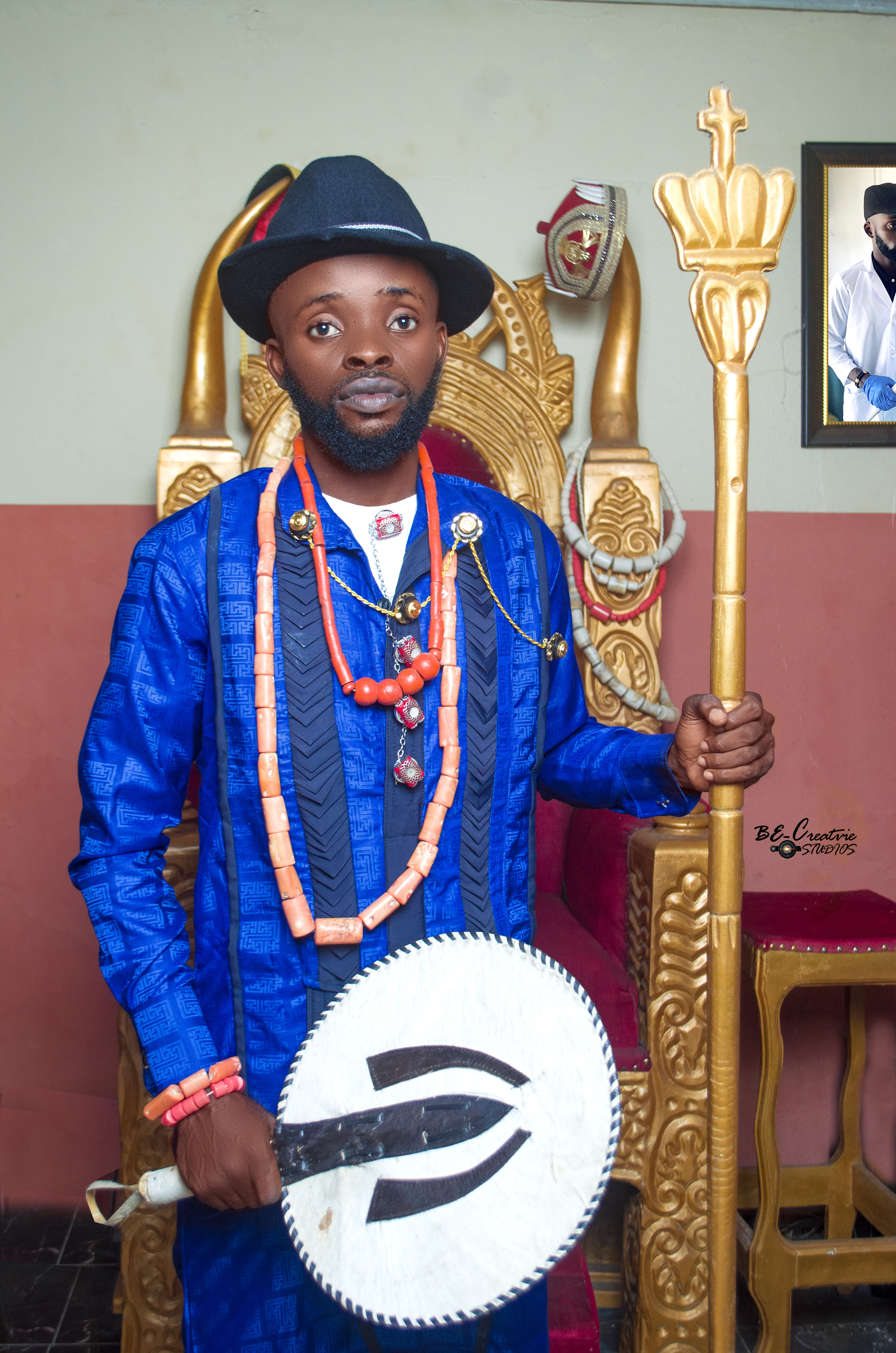
Engenni cultural attires

The Engenni people live in the Niger Delta region of Nigeria. They speak a language which linguistic scholars have classified to be Edoid. They live in close proximity with other Ijaw people. They primarily live in Ahoada west local government area of Rivers state, Nigeria. Although they consider themselves to be Engenni, the Engenni speak an Edoid language (Elugbe, 1989). Alagoa (2003) said: “---The penetration of the Niger-Delta by Edoid groups extends to the Epie-Atissa and Engenni of the central and Eastern Niger-Delta----The Epie, along with the Ogbia and other groups of the central and eastern Niger-Delta, are historically united with the Ijaw.” The other groups of the central and eastern Niger-Delta which Professor Ebiegberi Alagoa said that were historically united with the Ijaw, include the Engenni, as shown from his narrative above. The Engenni have close relations with neighbouring Ijaw tribes such as the Zarama and Epie-Atissa.

Historically, Engenni migrated from Benin and settled in an Isoko community and later founded a settlement called Ewurebe. Though no longer in existence, history has it that the settlement was situated near the border between the present-day Biseni in Bayelsa State and Engenni. They later migrated and founded other settlements which include Okilogua, Okpankio, Nyenegile and Eliabi (Akinima) and later founded the present day Engenni communities and other outside Engenni kingdom. Some communities founded from Engenni migration include, Degema, Usokun, Obonoma and Zarama. Engenni historical presence is also felt at Kula, Bile and some communities in Abua, Ogbia, as well as some other communities in Bayelsa State.

The Engenni clan is believed to have first settled in and around their present habitations over nine hundred years ago, as depicted by historical artifacts collected at Okilogua, Enusha, and the Ede-emu lakes at Ewurebe, Okilouga, Enusha, and Ikodi communities. Engenni kingdom is grouped among the Niger-Congo, Edoid people of Nigeria, belonging to the Kwa group of the Delta sub-Saharan Africa. They belong to the Guinean cluster and speak a primary language known originally as Ejiro. The Engenni people are among the first settlers in the Niger Delta region and this is corroborated by some aspects of the early history, culture and environmental characteristics of the kingdom as documented in the works of historians and early Christian visitors to the early 1800s.

Engenni Kingdom lies on the banks of the Engenni River (now known as part of the Orashi river). The Engenni River has significant tributaries like the Taylor creek and Kolo creek which are major gateways to other Niger Delta habitations like the Ijo clans, the Nembe, as well as the Ogbia and Kalabari kingdoms. The Engenni (Egene) language has metamorphosed into three major dialects namely Enuedua, Ogua, and Ejiro dialects.

Geopolitically, Engenni forms part of the present-day Ahoada West Local Government Area of Rivers State, and host the local Government Headquarters at Akinima. The kingdom is ruled by one government recognized traditional ruler, the Okilom-Ibe of Engenni kingdom, who is the paramount ruler of the Kingdom. All five federating clans of the kingdom have a Group-head known as the Okilom-Opiri, while communities within the clans that make up the Engenni kingdom have traditional heads known as the Okilom-Akie.

The earliest known documentation of Engenni language, culture, and phonetic sounds are those of American Baptist missionaries in the area, as well as occasional mention in the works of some missionaries on the Niger Delta region, as well as those generated by early European traders like the Lander Brothers, and the United African Company.

Engenni Kingdom is rich in crude oil and natural gas, and exploration and exploitation of these minerals began since 1956. The Shell Petroleum Development Company (formerly Royal Dutch Shell) found petroleum in commercial quantities at the Adebawa wells of Joinkrama, and have since then been engaged in commercial oil and gas activities in the area. The Adebawa oil wells of Joinkrama ranks only second to Oloibiri, where oil was first found in commercial quantities in Nigeria. This huge contribution to the Nigerian economy not withstanding Engenni has very little to show as the kingdom has no government presence except for local primary and secondary schools. The only road linking the Ogua and Enuedua (Joinkrama) clans of Engenni is a Shell access road, and no other part of the kingdom is motorable up till date, in spite of the fact that here are several oil wells scattered along the community. The major prospecting oil companies in the area are Shell and Agip.

Engenni is made up of major clans known as Enuedua (Joinkrama), Ogua, Ejiro—Ede, Ejiro-Ekunu. The Engenni clans are made up of about 31 towns and villages which include Betterland, Edagberi, Odawu, Isua, Ususu, Ogu, Adele, Clinton town and other towns of the Enuedua (Joinkrama) clan, Akinima, Okilogua, Oshie, Akioniso, One-Man-Country, Eneda (Mbiama), Ishayi and Agbo which make up the Ogua Clan, the Ejiro-Ede clan made up of Akiogbologbo, Enusha, Okarki, Ipilopanyi, Okparaki, and other towns in the Ejiro-Ede clan, the Ejiro-Ekunu clan made up of Ikodi, Kunusha, Igovia, Udoda, and other towns and villages.

== Significant events ==
- 1900 - The First Baptist Church is established in Okarki by Rev. Agbebi and others.
- 1903 - The first primary school is established by Baptist missionaries in Okarki town.
- 1908 - Ezeoka Akujiefor becomes the first Engenni indigenous Headmaster and pioneers the opening of primary school Akinima.
- 1910 - The Baptist missionaries establish a primary school in Isua Joinkrama.
- 1914 - The Ikodi Anglican Church was built.
- 1936 - Baptist missionaries establish a hospital in Ususu Joinkrama
- 1958 - Christopher Osuamkpe from Ususu, Joinkrama becomes first graduate of Engenni extraction by graduating with a B.A. degree from Georgetown College, and an M.A. from Columbia University the following year.
- September 1973 - Engenni kingdom unanimously elect His Majesty Adide Goodhead Grimmson Ogbonna Okilomibe II of Engenni kingdom.
- 1973 - Two government secondary schools are established in Adele-Joinkrama, and Okarki respectively.
- July 1978 - Okilomibe Goodhead Grimmson Ogbonna receives staff-of-office from the Rivers State Government and is classified as 2nd Class Ruler in the Rivers State Council of Traditional Rulers.
- 1981 - Prof. Ugunu Ayonoadu from Ikodi dies at the age of 37. He was the first indigenous professor from Engenni kingdom.
- August 1981 - Okarki community of Engenni is connected to the gas turbine grid at Imiringi.
- 1982 - Foremost educationist and first secretary of the schools management board in Old Rivers State, Imoru Jack, from Isua Joinkrama dies at the age of 42.
- 1996 - Ahoada West Local Government Area is created, with Akinima as LGA Headquarters.
- October 2005 - Engenni leaders condemned a decision by the Rivers State government to deny their request that the clan should be allowed to join Bayelsa State.
- 2006 - Paul Wilson Ugunu Ayonoadu was elected Okilomibe III, but was not crowned until after his death in March 2014.
- May 2007 - Miller Awori, of Engenni kingdom becomes first elected LGA Chairman of Engenni extract.
