= Islam in Akwa Ibom State =

Regions with significant populations
- Abak • Eket • Ibaka Town • Ikot Ekpene • Oron • Uyo

Religions
- Islam

Languages
- Fulfulde (Adamawa, Nigerian) • English (Nigerian, Pidgin) • Ibibio • Hausa • Igbo • Yoruba

Islam in Akwa Ibom State is a minority religion; the state is overwhelmingly Christian, but Islam has a documented presence dating to settlement of migrant hunters and traders from northern Nigeria in the late nineteenth and early twentieth century.

The Akwa Ibom Council of Islamic Affairs and state chapter of the Nigerian Supreme Council for Islamic Affairs administer Muslim communal affairs in the state. The Muslim population is dominated by (largely northern) non-indigene migrants — largely civil servants, traders, and soldiers — along with their descendants and a much smaller community of indigenous Akwa Ibomite converts. As of 2009, the Sarkin Hausa of Uyo estimated that approximately 15,000 Hausa Muslim migrants were settled in Uyo alone, contrasted with about 150 indigenous converts across the entire state as of 2016.

== History ==
=== Colonial period ===
The presence of Muslims in now-Akwa Ibom was first recorded in the late nineteenth and early twentieth century. Interviews in the book Islam in the Niger Delta 1890-2017 point to itinerant hunters as the first Muslims in the area, with community elders telling author and historian Egodi Uchendu that more northerners settled around Uyo in 1936 after the hunters left. Uchendu also found colonial reports about the recruitment of northern elephant hunters to the Eastern Region, including hunting sites around Eket and Opobo. Additionally, Waheed Azeez — who produced the first academic study of Islam in Akwa Ibom State and became the first chief imam of the University of Uyo mosque — documented that Muslim "service men and civil servants" from northern and western Nigeria came to Ikot Ekpene "during the colonial era" due to the city's status as a District headquarters.

Those [Hausa migrants] who came first were from Bauchi and they were hunters, but the environment was not conducive for them so they moved away. Others came after them and settled. That was around 1936. I don't know when the hunters came. It was in 1936 that the first migrants came and settled...They were here until the civil war broke out and [the Hausa leader] left, but returned in 1969. That was when the Hausa started to settle.

— migrant Musa Tahir on early Hausa migrants, interview by Egodi Uchendu in May 2009

The oldest predominantly-Hausa settlement in the Uyo area is conventionally dated to the early 1950s, when migrants established a community "by the old market" on Aka Road. Simultaneously, "some seventy" Hausa migrants had established a presence at Ikot Ekpene around the 1950s, servicing the cattle trade along the route from Adamawa and northern Cameroon. However, not all of these migrants were Muslim, with the community's leader practicing Hausa animism. Data from the 1953 census showed the community's population was still small, with the Muslim percentage at 0.14% and below 0.5% in each of the five divisions — Abak (0.43%), Eket (0.11%), Ikot Ekpene (0.11%), Opobo (0.03%), and Uyo (0.03%) — that would become Akwa Ibom State. The numbers were even lower in the post-independence 1963 census — Abak (0.06%), Eket (0.02%), Ikot Ekpene (0.06%), Opobo (0.02%), and Uyo (0.02%) — at 0.03% Muslim across now-Akwa Ibom.

=== Civil War and early settlement ===
The lead up to the Civil War disrupted the early Muslim settlement in now-Akwa Ibom. Most pre-war northern migrants departed before the outbreak of hostilities in July 1967 and the Aka Road settlement was abandoned. Those migrants who returned in 1969 and 1970 — accompanied by new arrivals and contractors supplying cattle to military barracks — established a new community, still on Aka Road, that significantly grew in the following years.

The Akwa Ibom area's status as a transit point for northern migrants headed further south made it a staging ground for post-war settlement. As a Uyo Muslim community leader explained, migrants from Adamawa would go south to "Ogoja and enter Abakaliki to Ikot Ekpene. From Ikot Ekpene, they entered Uyo; Uyo to Oron. At Oron, they take the canoe to Calabar."

By the 1980s, the Hausa migrant community in Uyo had grown large enough to "coordinate themselves into a united community" according to Azeez. In 1981, the community secured land for a temporary mosque and started prayers there in October 1985. A second temporary mosque was constructed in 1988 after the first mosque's property was absorbed into the site designated for the new state government complex following state creation in 1987.

The pattern was similar for the Muslims of Ikot Ekpene. A second wave of Hausa settlement occurred during the civil war, between 1969 and 1970. Military units moved with civilian Muslim traders — particularly cattle dealers — who leveraged army supply contracts to expand the cattle business. After the ceasefire in 1970, civilian Muslim traders took over the military quarters. The local government subsequently reclaimed that area and allocated the Hausa community a different plot of land, but indigene villagers drove the migrants away. In 1988, a village head granted the Muslim community a prayer ground — from which they were again expelled by other residents. The Ikot Ekpene Muslim community eventually got land for a permanent mosque in 2009.

In Eket, Ibaka, Ikot Abasi, and Oron, Muslim migrant communities date from either the post-civil war period or the creation of the state. Eket, a major centre of the oil industry, has a Muslim community includes professional and semi-skilled workers employed by the oil sector, federal government employees, and international immigrants drawn by the city's status as a petroleum hub; thus, Eket has a more economically unique and internationally varied character than other Akwa Ibom Muslim communities. Oron has a population of Ghanaian Muslim fishermen while the Ibaka Muslim community is largely made up of soldiers posted in the area. In these towns, "national and expatriate petrochemical industrial workers, soldiers and federal employees form the core of the Muslim population."

Prior to state creation in 1987, there were a "very minimal" number of Akwa Ibom indigene converts to Islam with those indigenous Muslims having converted "mostly during sojourns in Northern and Western Nigeria." The handful of indigenous Muslims conversions in Akwa Ibom were the result of individual interactions between migrant Muslims and indigenes.

=== Statehood and community growth ===
Following the creation of Akwa Ibom State in 1987, there was a major influx of Muslim migrants, as the new capital city of Uyo attracted civil servants, traders, and professionals from across Nigeria. Additionally, many new Muslim residents moved from other areas of southern Nigeria like southeastern cities, Calabar, or as close as Ikot Ekpene. The growth of the community led to a push for a permanent mosque, with military governor Godwin Abbe setting out a piece of land which eventually then-presidential candidate Bashir Tofa bought for the community while campaigning in 1993. The next year, the migrant community built a mosque at the site with financial assistance from prominent northerners after a fundraising drive organised by Akwa Ibom's then-military governor Yakubu Bako — a Hausa Muslim from Kano State — and chaired by Emir of Kano Ado Bayero. However, the mosque was destroyed in early 2000 in the reprisal attacks after the killing of non-Muslims and the destruction of churches in the north during the serial religious violence over the introduction of sharia law, particularly the first wave of Kaduna riots in February 2000.

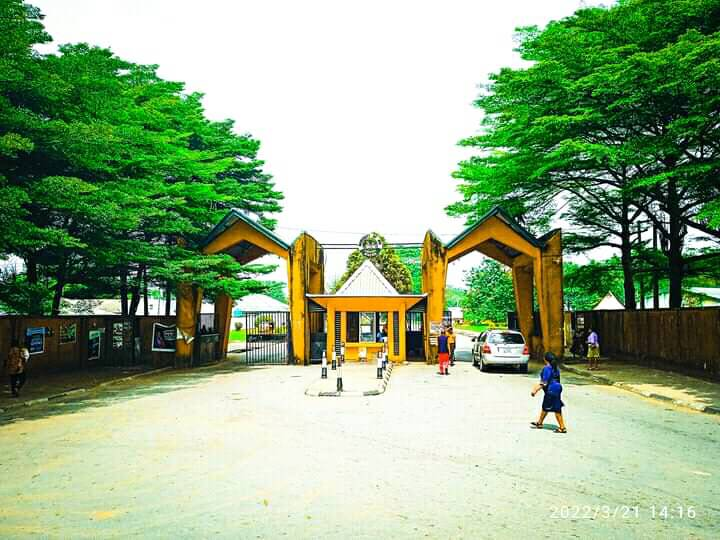
University Of Uyo

Most conversions of Akwa Ibom indigenes to Islam in Uyo occurred during the 1990s, specifically during the tenures of military governor Bako and Fola Lasisi — a Yoruba Muslim who served as vice chancellor of the University of Uyo. Uchendu notes a common belief in the state that these public figures encouraged conversions to Islam among indigenes. A convert recalled that most fellow indigenous Muslims at the university converted during Lasisi's tenure from 1992 to 1999, saying "When I asked them of their conversion they said 'Lasisi sent me,' 'Lasisi employed me'; which means, without asking further, that because Lasisi gave them a job, they decided to embrace Islam."

At this point, the broader Muslim community in Uyo began to stratify into two broad social categories that Uchendu terms "the town and the gown." Hausa and Fulani migrants comprise the majority of Muslims in the city but around the university, Yoruba Muslims predominate among students and staff. These students formed a Muslim Students Society of Nigeria chapter in 1992 while Muslim graduates on national youth service deployments also organised through the Muslim Corpers Association of Nigeria state chapter.

In 2000, the Akwa Ibom Muslim community was formally organised with the formation of the state's chapter of the Nigerian Supreme Council for Islamic Affairs.

=== Twenty-first century ===
A further influx of northern migrants to Uyo between 2000 and 2002 was partly triggered by attacks on Muslims in neighbouring southeastern states following the religious riots in Northern Nigeria. Most northern migrants who moved to Uyo at this time had been living in Igboland, particularly Aba and Umuahia, and — although the Uyo mosque was destroyed and many Muslims temporarily fled from Uyo — these northerners moved to Akwa Ibom as the situation for Muslims was much safer in the South-South than in the South-East. In 2002, the Hausa settlement moved to Mbak Itam on land provided by the state government after their property at its previous location was protested by indigenes who objected to its strategic position at the entrance to Uyo; nonetheless, the community continued to grow.

The indigenous Muslim population of Akwa Ibom grew from approximately 300 in 2009 to 752 in 2011, according to figures supplied by the state NSCIA chapter and corroborated by the Islamic Movement for the Niger Delta. However, the 2011 figure was noted by potentially inflated by people seeking to use the hajj as an emigration opportunity.

In the early 2010s, indigenous converts attempted to organise themselves through bodies like the Mdoho Muslims of Akwa Ibom State — a Muslim indigene organisation founded in 2014. However, the group struggled financially and its meetings were suspended within a year due to non-participation by members, reportedly due to economic difficulties among members, pressure from husbands on women members, societal stigmatization and Islamophobia amidst Boko Haram violence, and opposition from non-indigenous Muslims who allegedly feared that the group would "wrest opportunities [non-indigenes] are utilising from them." From 2013, the number of indigenous Muslim converts began to dwindle across all Niger Delta states. Uchendu directly attributes this decline to "factors linked to the jihad by Boko Haram," which created a public association between Islam and lethal violence. Intensified proselytisation efforts by Islamic organisations alongside increased inter-religious marriages failed to reverse the trend as the number of indigenous converts fell to approximately 150 by 2016.

Here in Akwa Ibom people invite me for child dedication and other programmes. I attend. These are just part of the [inter-religious] relationship.

— assistant state chief imam Mohammed Adamu on interfaith outreach, interview by Egodi Uchendu in May 2009

Later in the 2010s, the broader climate of anti-Muslim suspicion continued to suppress indigenous conversions and to place pressure on the Muslim community's social standing. Community leaders noted the persistence of suspicion even as direct hostility declined. In response, Muslim community leaders started interfaith outreach with the state's assistant chief imam attending Christian programmes including child dedication ceremonies, and describing it as part of building the social relationships needed to counter negative perceptions of Islam.

A flashpoint emerged in July 2021 when the state education ministry scheduled examinations on Eid al-Adha, a federally designated public holiday. Following public criticism, the state government reversed the directive and rescheduled the exams.

By the 2020s, the community was organised under the Akwa Ibom Council of Islamic Affairs, whose leadership includes the Chairman of the League of Imams Abubakar Sadiq, Sarakin Hausawa of Uyo Alhaji Hassan Sadauki, and senior community figures and imams. Governor Umo Eno, who assumed office in 2023, continued the practice of hosting annual Ramadan iftars with the Muslim community at Government House.

== Demographics ==
Religious groups in modern Akwa Ibom State (Note: Comprising the Abak, Eket, Ikot Ekpene, Opobo, and Uyo divisions of Calabar Province.)
Religious group	1952		1963	
Religious group	Pop.	%	Pop.	%
Christianity	950,569	77.69%	2,379,904	95.77%
Islam	1,721	0.14%	820	0.03%
Others	271,221	22.17%	104,375	4.2%
Total population	1,223,511	100%	2,485,098	100%

Nigeria does not currently publish religious census data, as the last census effort to include religion took place in 1973 and its results were not published. Prior to 1973, religious figures in the controversial 1952 and 1963 censuses put the Muslim population of now-Akwa Ibom at 1721 (0.1%) and 820 (0.03%), respectively. Precise updated figures for the Muslim population of Akwa Ibom State are not available.

As is common with Niger Delta Muslim communities, the Akwa Ibom Muslim population is divided between indigenous converts and non-indigene migrants. The migrant portion comprises the vast majority of the population, largely ethnic Fulani, Hausa, Igbo, and Yoruba Muslim community members along with immigrants from Ghana.

Hausa and Fulani migrants from Northern Nigeria form the largest group of Akwa Ibom Muslims, with sub-communities specifically from Adamawa, Bauchi, Kaduna, Kano, and Sokoto states involved in the trade of currency, livestock, and produce along with tailoring and street food vending. Although there are attempts to present a united front, there have been historic tensions within the northern community, often on ethnic lines. The most significant conflict was a series of crises in the 1980s and 1990s over the leadership of the Uyo northern community, rooted in competition between various Hausa and Fulani elders over who held legitimate leadership claims. The crisis was resolved when the community held an election in 2001 that produced a compromise candidate, Hassan Sadauki — a younger, Aba-born Hausa man fluent in Ibibio and Igbo who was seen as bridging the migrant and host-community worlds. Sadauki remains Sarkin Hausawa of Uyo as of 2026.

Yoruba Muslims predominate in the University of Uyo area while Igbo Muslims — described by Uchendu as influential in the broader Niger Delta Muslim community — also have a presence. The Yoruba migrant Muslim community was regarded as particularly active in proselytization efforts in Uyo in the years following state creation. In 2015, Sadauki claimed "few indigenes and other tribes" followed the Hausa, Yoruba, and Igbo Muslim populations in size.

=== Sunni–Ahmadiyya tensions ===
The Ahmadiyya community arrived in Uyo in the 1990s — later than in Port Harcourt (1946) and Calabar (1975) — and its presence generated significant internal tension within the migrant Muslim community. As of May 2009, very few Ahmadiyya Muslims were present in Uyo — including Abdulmajeed Bello, a scholar educated at Al-Azhar University, who had moved from Ilorin to pursue missionary work in Uyo's academic community. The attempt to spread Ahmadiyya theology was met with hostility from the longer-established Sufi orders — the Qadiriyya and Tijaniyya — and Salafi-oriented Muslims, who brought the matter before the state Council for Islamic Affairs and urged a boycott of Ahmadiyya programmes. The acting chief imam reported that the council declined to restrict Ahmadiyya activities, noting that as a registered organisation it was constitutionally entitled to operate; however, some community members refused to pray alongside Ahmadiyya Muslims and continued to discriminate against the group.

=== Women ===
As in other Niger Delta Muslim communities, women constitute a small fraction of indigenous Muslim converts in Akwa Ibom State. Uchendu observes that the majority of Muslim women in the state entered Islam through marriage to Muslim men, often northern Nigerian migrants, and that many subsequently return to Christianity or traditional religion after the end of their marriages or the death of Muslim husbands. Several organisations, including the state chapter of the Federation of Muslim Women's Associations of Nigeria, host welfare and religious education activities for Muslim women. On the other hand, Muslim women students reported avoiding Muslim organisations to Uchendu "to avoid coming under the control of their male fellow students" due to sexist "censorship."

== Organisations ==
Access to the Muslim Pilgrims Welfare Board — which administers the annual pilgrimage to Mecca — has been a site of political contestation between migrant and indigenous Muslims in Akwa Ibom. Until the early 2010s, non-indigenes always held the chairmanship of the board. The appointment of Baba Jaro and then Abdulrasheed Asuquo — both indigenes — to the chairmanship was thus regarded as a milestone for the indigenous Muslim community.

However, the appointment generated a new dispute: Sadauki and other northern community members objected to Asuquo's broader claim to leadership over the entire Akwa Ibom Muslim community, arguing that his role at the Pilgrims Board had a far narrower scope than Asuquo implied and non-indigenes — who constituted the overwhelming majority of the Muslim population — were entitled to representation. The dispute illustrated a structural tension common to Niger Delta Muslim communities, where the institutional logic of political representation (which privileges indigenes) conflicts with the demographics of migrant-majority Muslim populations.

== Notable people ==
- Yakubu Bako, military governor from 1993 to 1996

== See also ==
- Islam in Nigeria
- Islam in Bayelsa State
