= Otuoke =

Otuoke Oke Family Ogbia Central
- Town
- Nickname: The Home of Goodluck Jonathan"
- Motto(s): "Oneness and Progress"
- Location of Otuoke in Nigeria
- Coordinates: 4°42′23.418″N 6°19′44.472″E
- Country: Nigeria
- State: Bayelsa State
- Local Government Area: Ogbia

Government
  - Type: Monarchy
  - His Royal Higness: HRH Ariwareni Engoye Paul CAN, JP (Oke De XI)

Population (2023)"Source: Independent National Electoral Commission (INEC) - Bayelsa State Voter Register, 2023
  - Total: 5,491
- Time zone: UTC+1 (WAT)
- numeric-based: 562103
- Otuoke is a town known to be the birthplace of former Nigerian President Goodluck Jonathan

Otuoke is a suburb in Ogbia local government area of Bayelsa State in the Niger Delta region of Nigeria. Majority of its inhabitants are farmers and fishermen. Otuoke town primarily consist of three families namely; Emom, Akatim and Akiniama. The town is accessible by land and water

The community houses the Federal University Otuoke which is a federal government-owned institution.

== Notable people ==
- Goodluck Ebele Jonathan

== Higher institutions ==
- Federal University Otuoke
- Milford Obiene Okilo
