= Fuo, Ghana =

Community in the Northern Region of Ghana

Coordinates: 9°16′N 0°38′W

Fuo, is a community in Sagnarigu Municipal Assembly in the Northern Region of Ghana. It is located in the Eastern part of Tamale, Fuo has a community hospital Fuo Community Hospital. It has been one of the fastest and peaceful developing community in the Sagnarigu Municipality.

== See also ==
- Suburbs of Tamale (Ghana) metropolis
