= Yenagoa =

Capital city of Bayelsa State, Nigeria

Yenagoa YELGA
- City and local government area
- Interactive map of Yenagoa
- Location in Nigeria
- Coordinates: 5°02′N 6°20′E
- Country: Nigeria
- State: Bayelsa State
- Headquarters: Yenagoa

Government
  - Type: Local Government Council
  - Local Government Chairman: Toby Andy (PDP)

Area
  - Total: 706.7 km^{2} (272.9 sq mi)

Population (2024 est)
  - Total: 798,466
  - Density: 1,130/km^{2} (2,926/sq mi)
- Time zone: UTC+1 (WAT)
- 3-digit postal code prefix: 561
- ISO 3166 code: NG.BY.YE
- Climate: Am

Yenagoa is a Local Government Area and capital city of Bayelsa State, Southern Nigeria. It is located in the Niger Delta region of the country at coordinates 4°55′29″N 6°15′51″E.

The LGA has an area of 706 km^{2} and an estimated population of 798,466 at 2024.

The postal code of the area is 561.

The Ijaws form the majority of the Local Government Area. English is the official language, but Epie-Atissa language is one of the local languages spoken in Yenagoa, others such as Ekpetiama, Gbarian, Buseni and Zarama are Ijaw dialect in Yenagoa LGA.

Bayelsa Airport (Bayelsa International Airport) is an airport located in the Bayelsa State capital of Yenagoa, southern Nigeria. Yenagoa Bayelsa Airport received its first aircraft arrival on February 14, 2019.

Yenagoa is the home of Bayelsa United, a men's association football club that plays in the second-tier Nigeria National League, and Bayelsa Queens, a women's football club in the NWFL Premiership. The two clubs won the 2021 Aiteo Cup for men and women respectively. The men's match took place at the new Samuel Ogbemudia Stadium in Benin City, Benin. Bayelsa United defeated Nasarawa United 4–3 on penalties after the regular period and added time had ended 2–2.

== List of towns and villages ==
- Kaiama

== Climate ==
Yenagoa experiences unpleasant weather all year round, with the wet season being warm and cloudy and the dry season being hot and mostly cloudy. The average annual temperature fluctuates between 71 °F and 87 °F, rarely falling below 63 °F or rising over 90 °F.

It is situated in an area of swamps and mangrove tropical rainforest.

=== Clouds ===
The average proportion of the sky that is covered by clouds in Yenagoa varies significantly seasonally throughout the year.

Yenagoa's clearer season starts about November 17 and lasts for 2.8 months, coming to a finish around February 11.

In Yenagoa, December is the clearest month of the year, with the sky remaining clear, mostly clear, or partly cloudy 41% of the time on average.

Beginning at February 11 and lasting for 9.2 months, the cloudier period of the year ends around November 17.

In Yenagoa, April is the month with the most clouds, with the sky being cloudy or mostly cloudy 87% of the time on average.

=== Precipitation ===
A day that has at least 0.04 inches of liquid or liquid-equivalent precipitation is considered to be wet. In Yenagoa, the likelihood of rainy days fluctuates wildly throughout the year.

In the 7.7-month wetter season, which runs from March 20 to November 11, there is a more than 46% chance that any given day would be rainy. In Yenagoa, September has an average of 24.5 days with at least 1.0 millimetre (0.04 inches) of precipitation, making it the month with the most wet days.

Between November 11 and March 20, or 4.3 months, is the dry season. January has an average of 2.8 days with at least 1.0 millimetre (0.04 inches) of precipitation, making it the month with the fewest wet days in Yenagoa.

Wet days are categorized by rain. In Yenagoa, September has an average of 24.5 days of rain, which is the most of any month. According to this classification, rain alone is the most frequent type of precipitation throughout the year, with a high likelihood of 83% on September 12.

== Notable Natives ==
- Diezani Alison-Madueke, former Minister of Petroleum
- Chief Werinipre Seibarugo (8th Governor of Bayelsa State)
- Sen. Emmanuel Paulker (former Senator representing Bayelsa Central Senatorial District)
- Ihuarulam Uche (born 1996), footballer
- Sen. Heineken Lokpobiri. Former member and speaker of the Bayelsa state house of assembly, former senator, former minister of agriculture and the current minister of state of petroleum(2026)

== Gallery ==
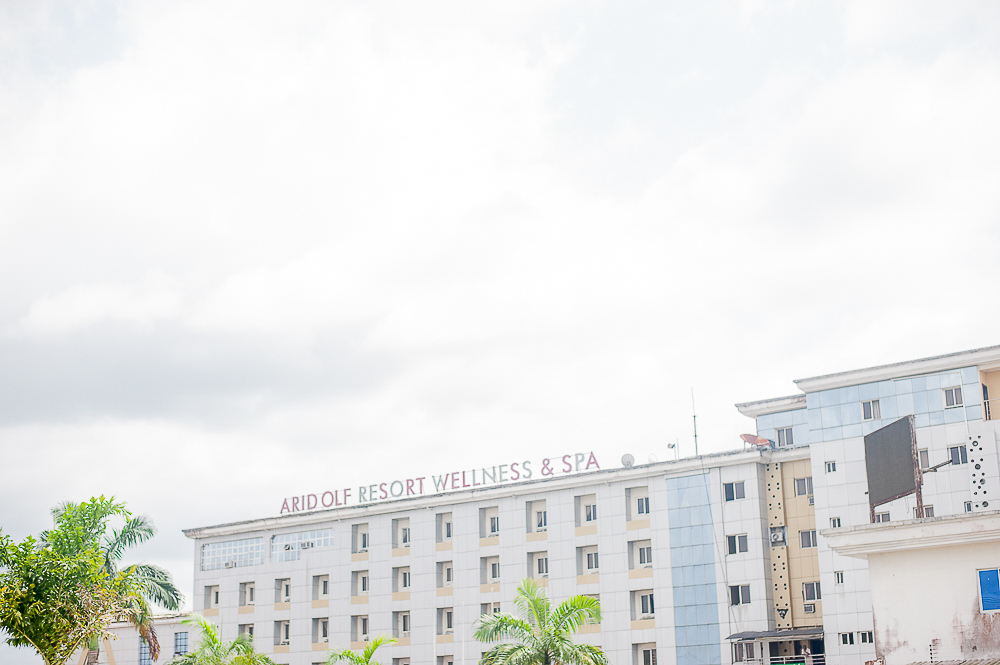

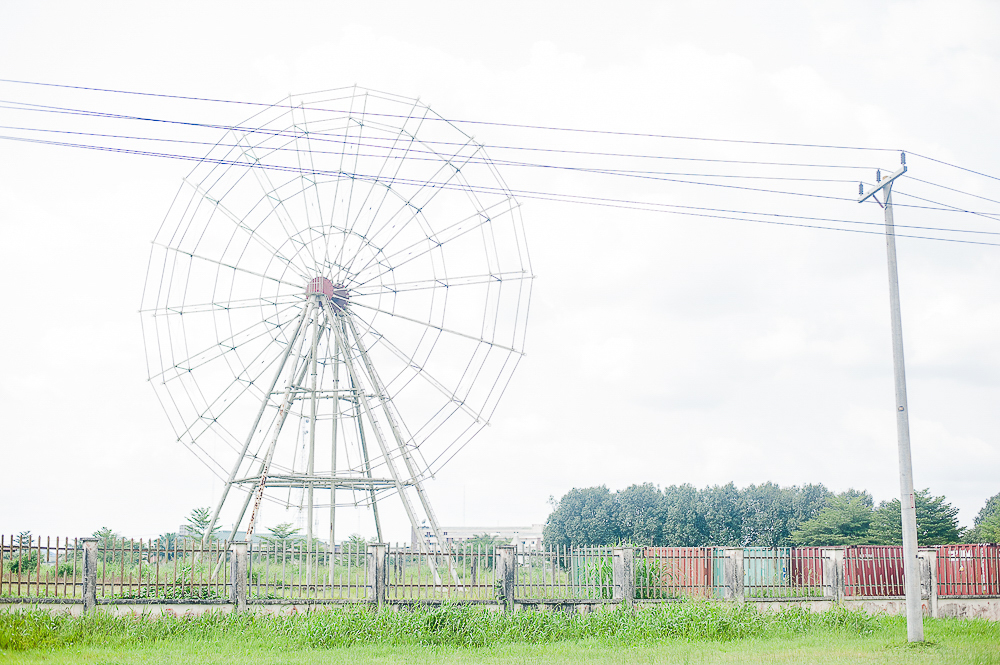

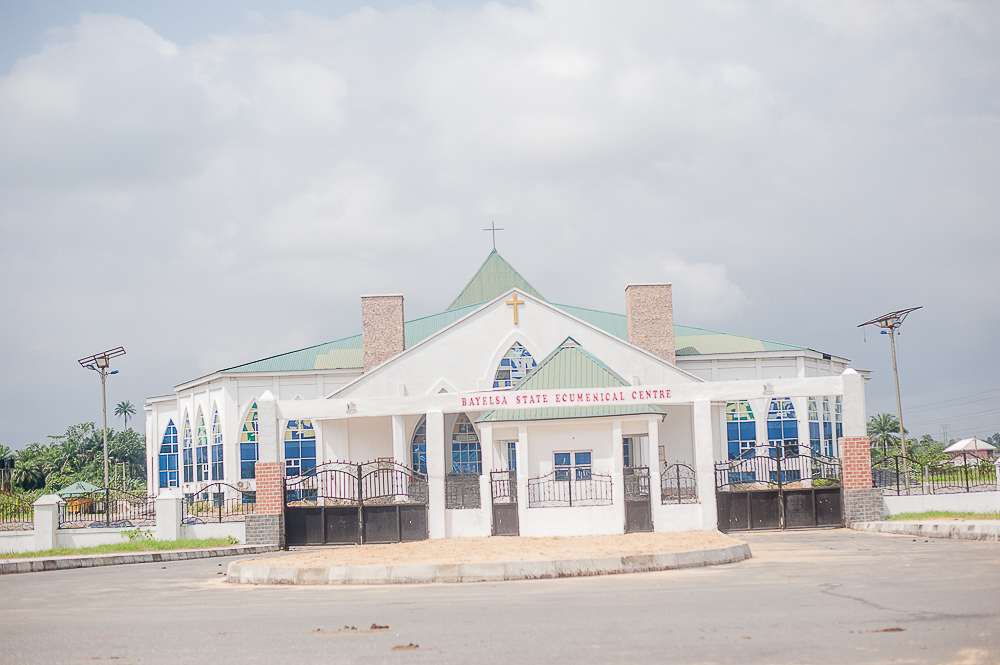

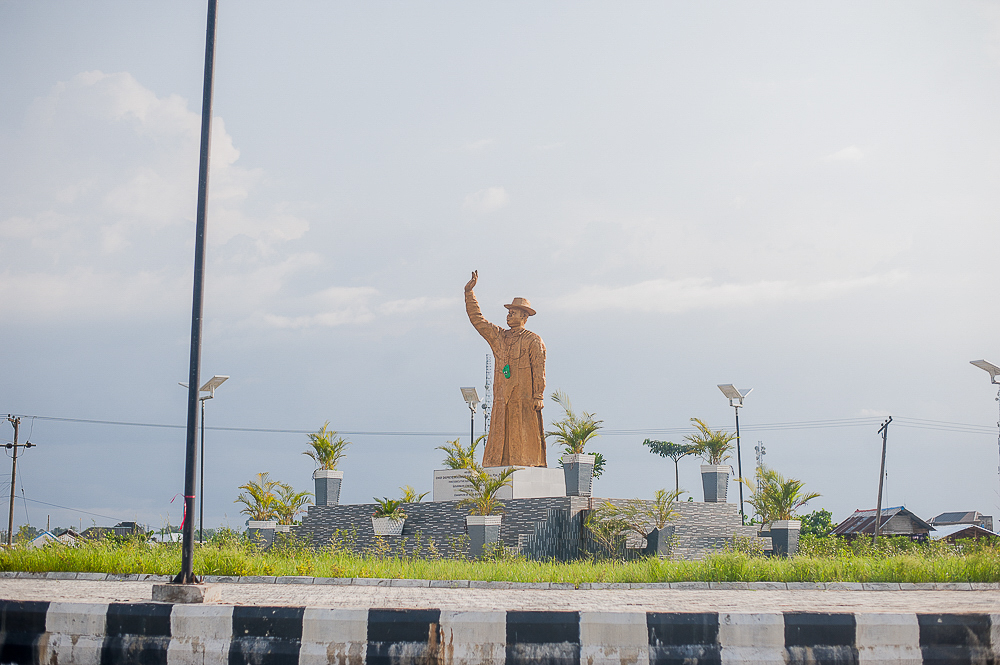

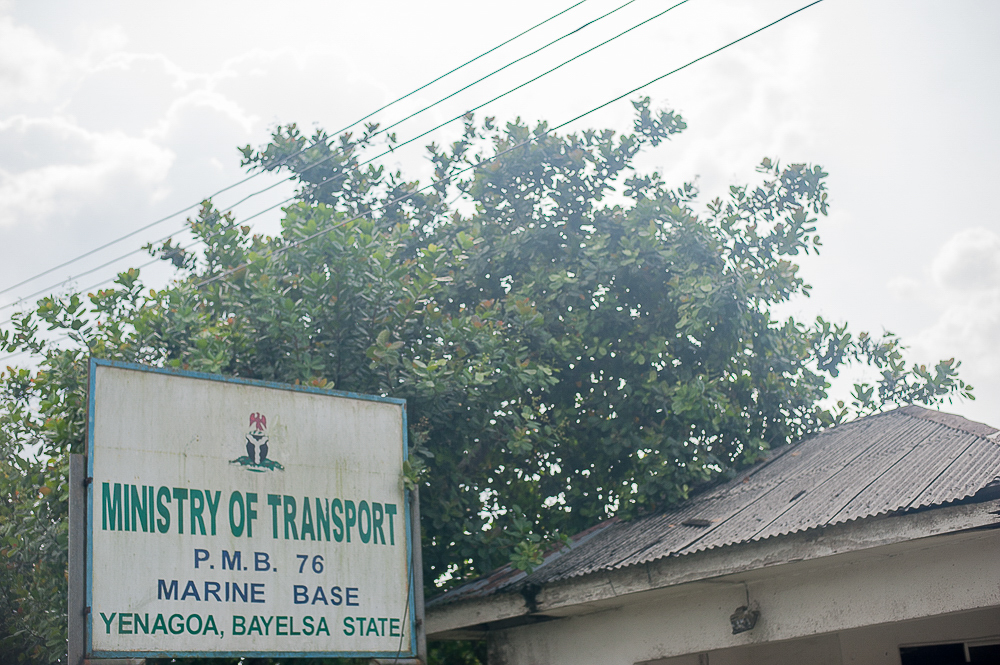

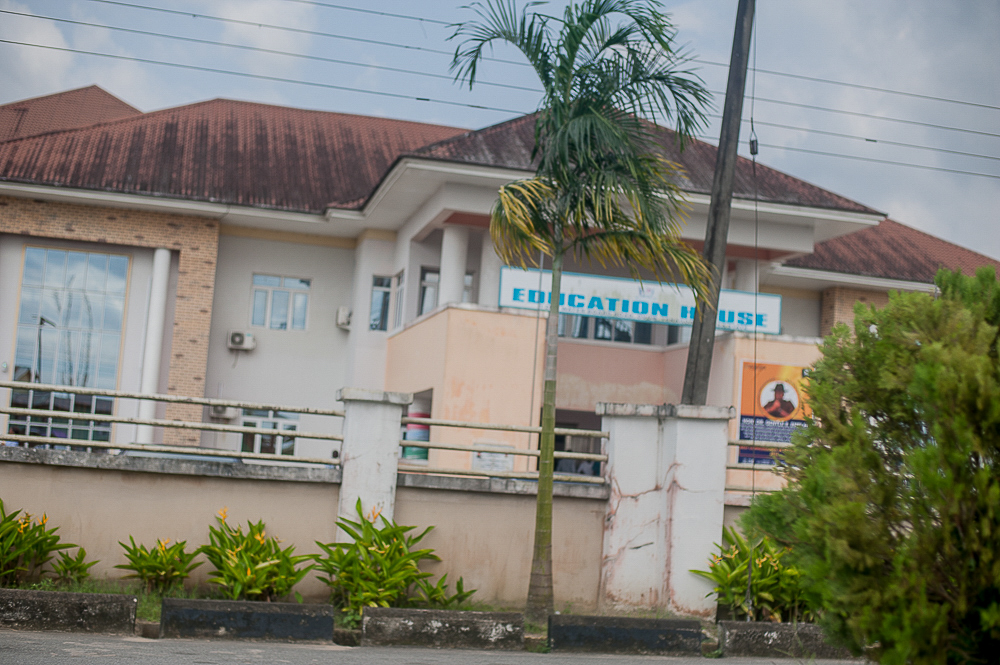

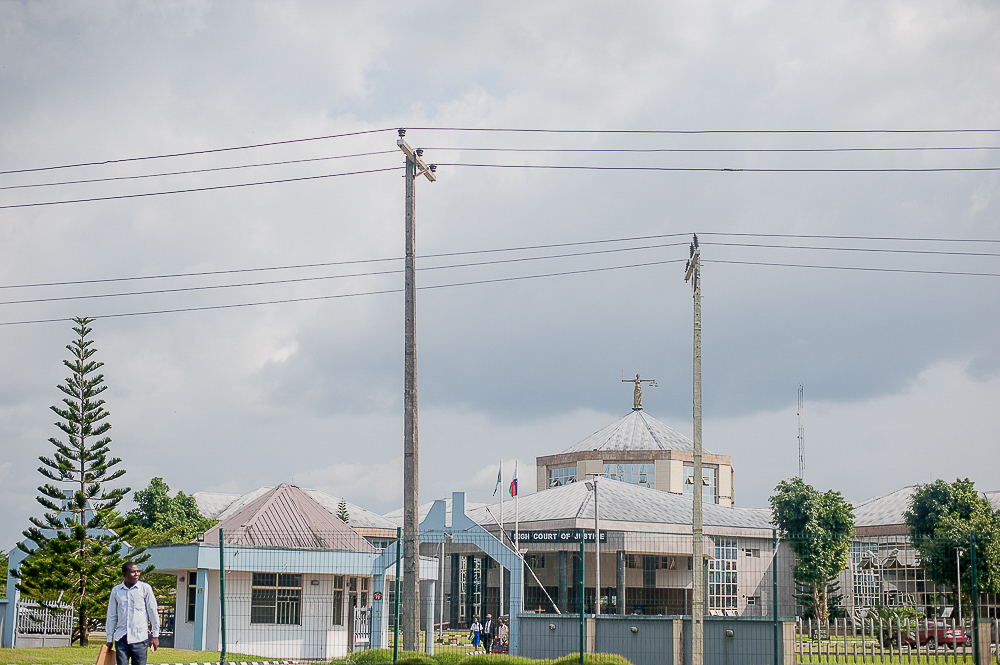

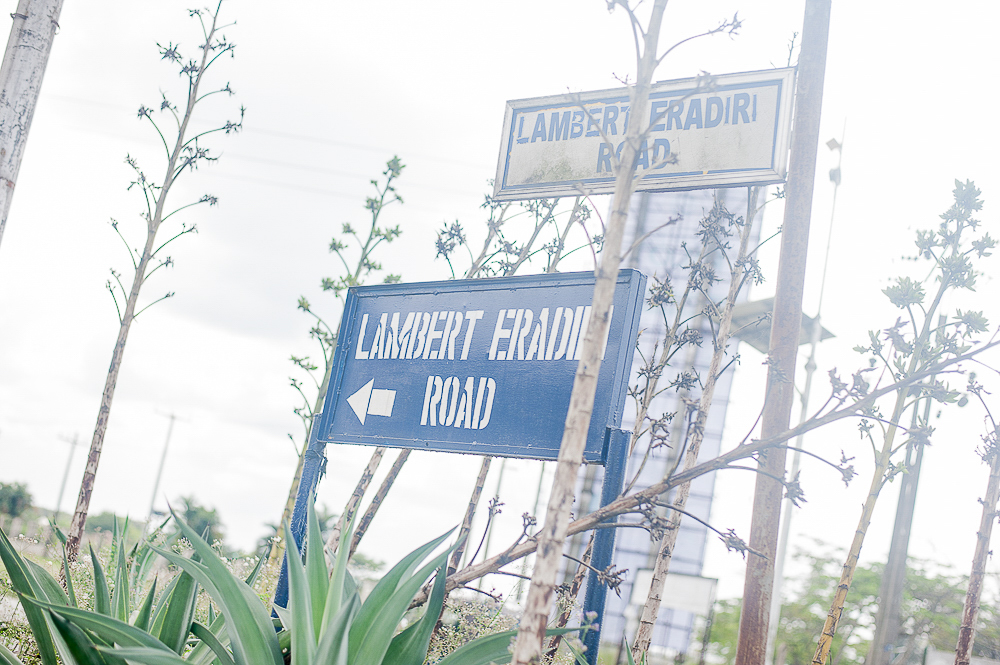

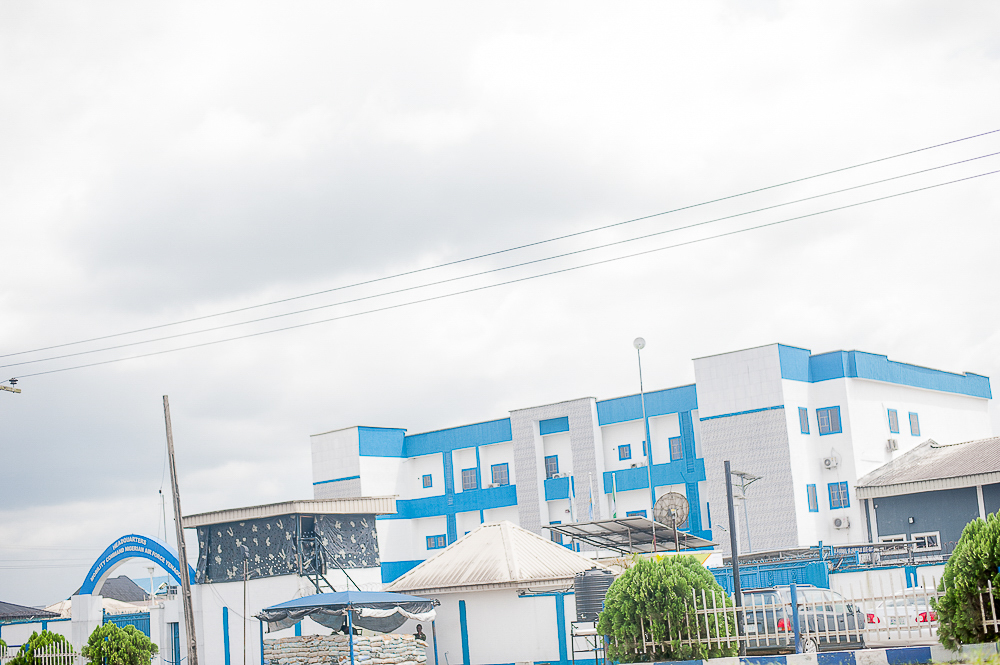

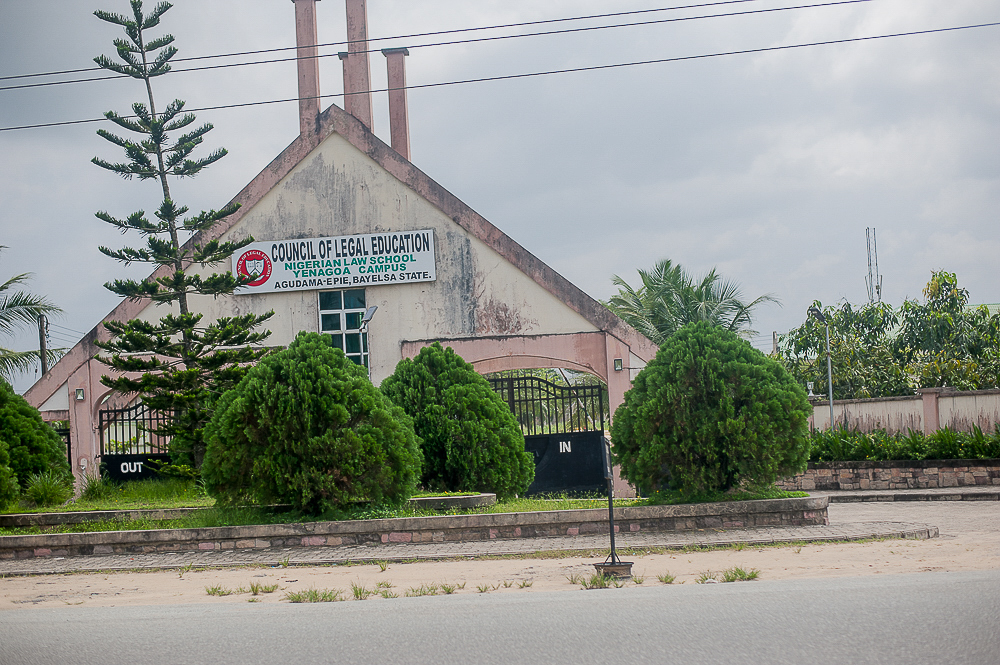

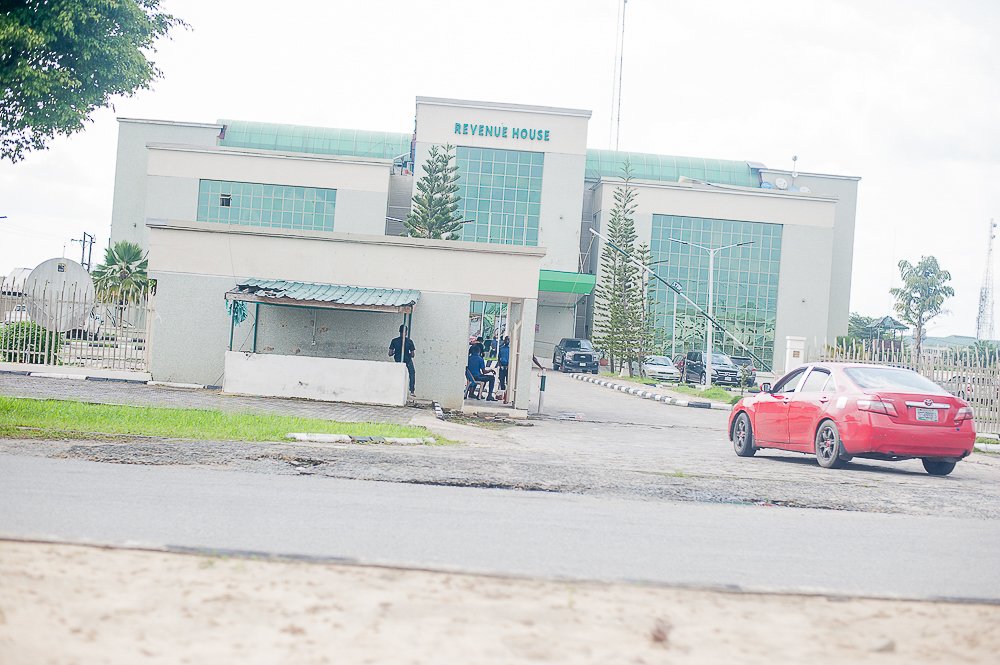

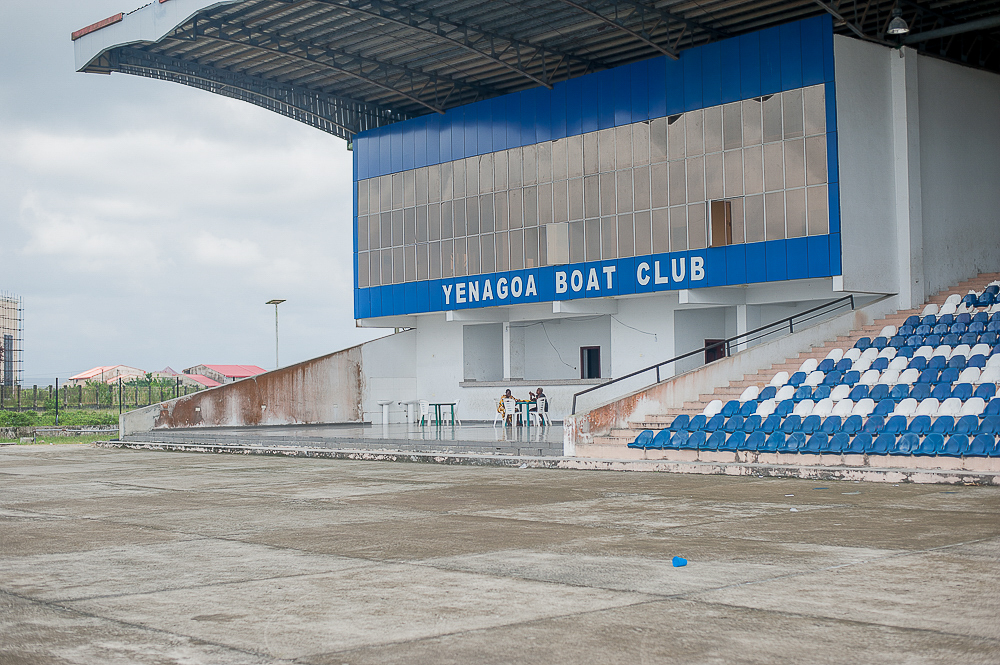

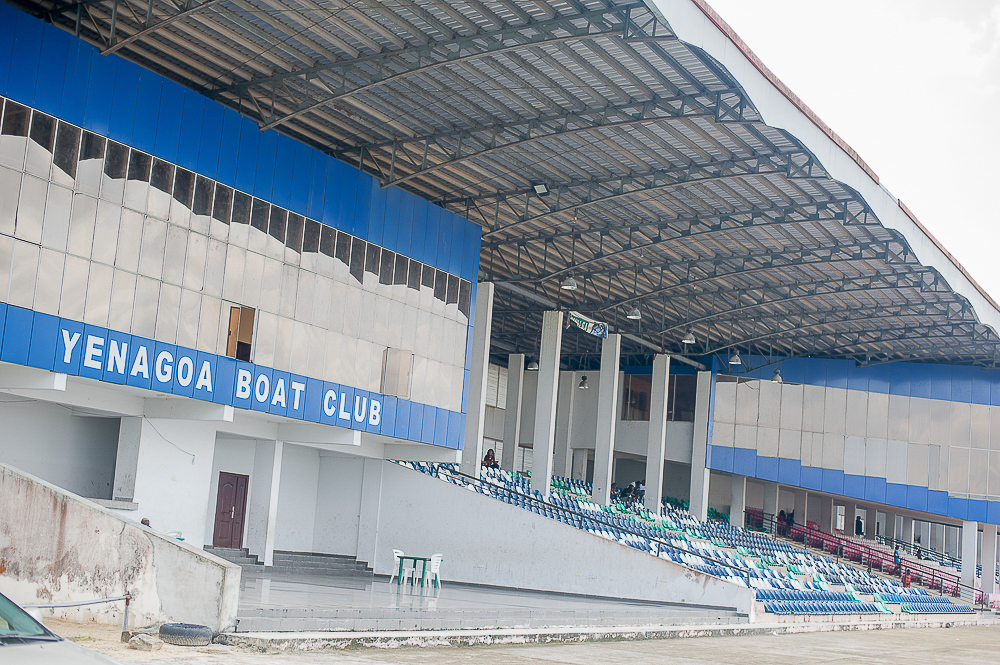

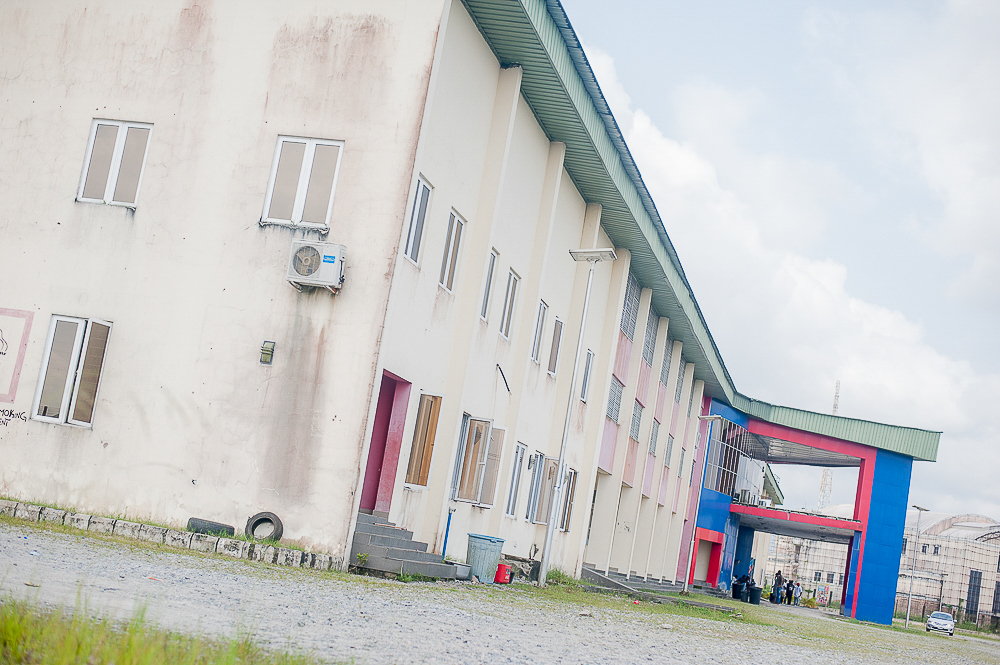

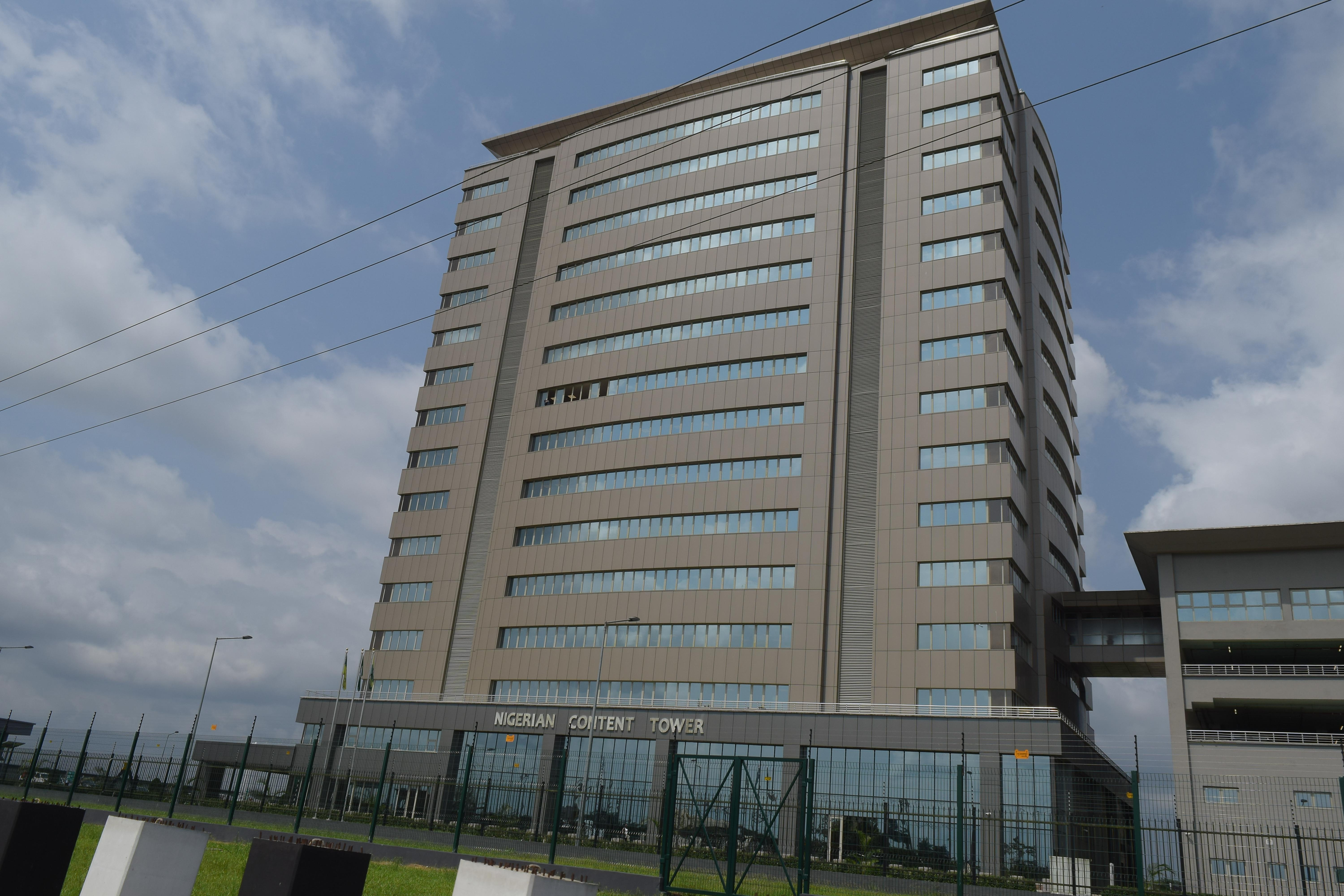

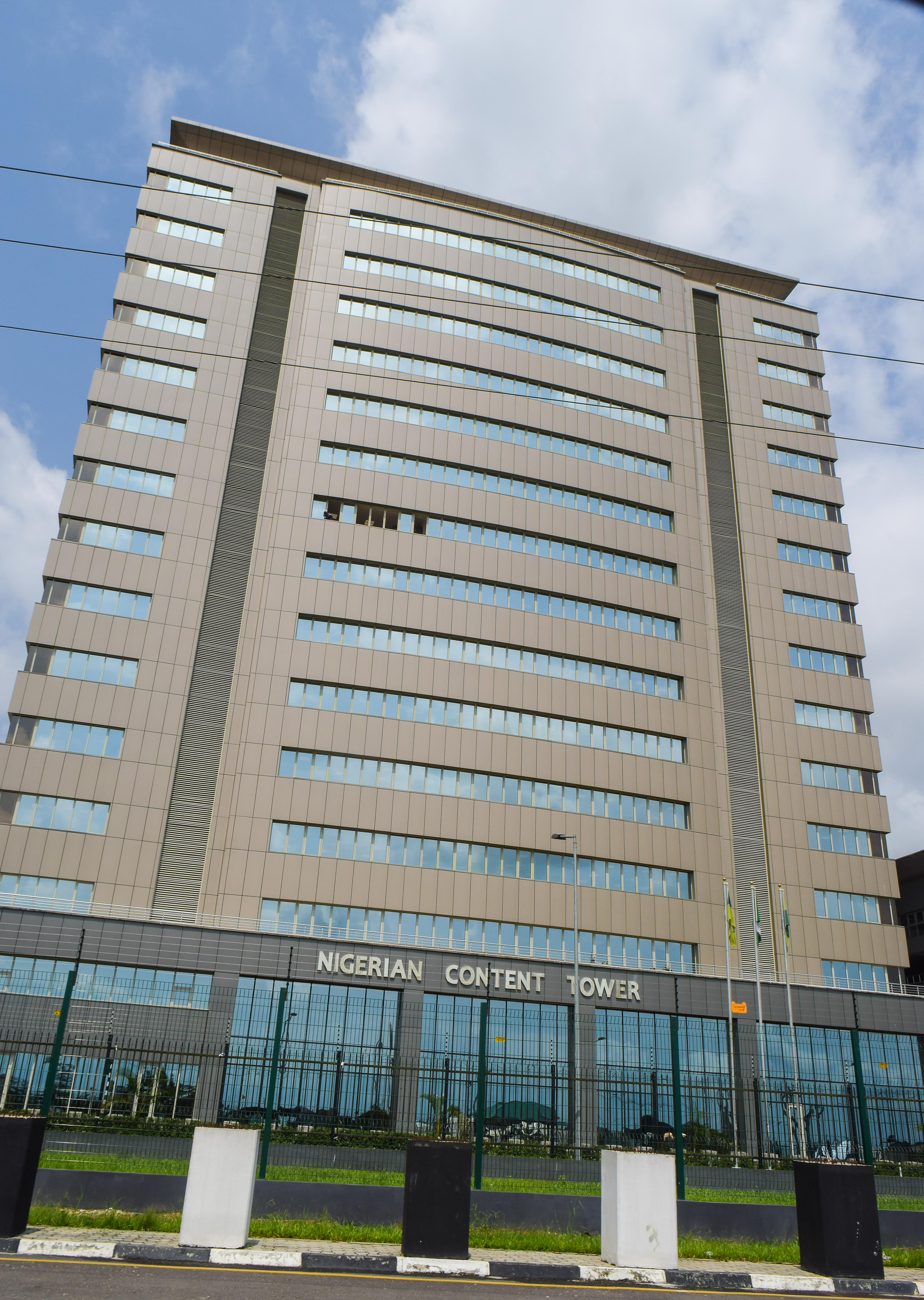

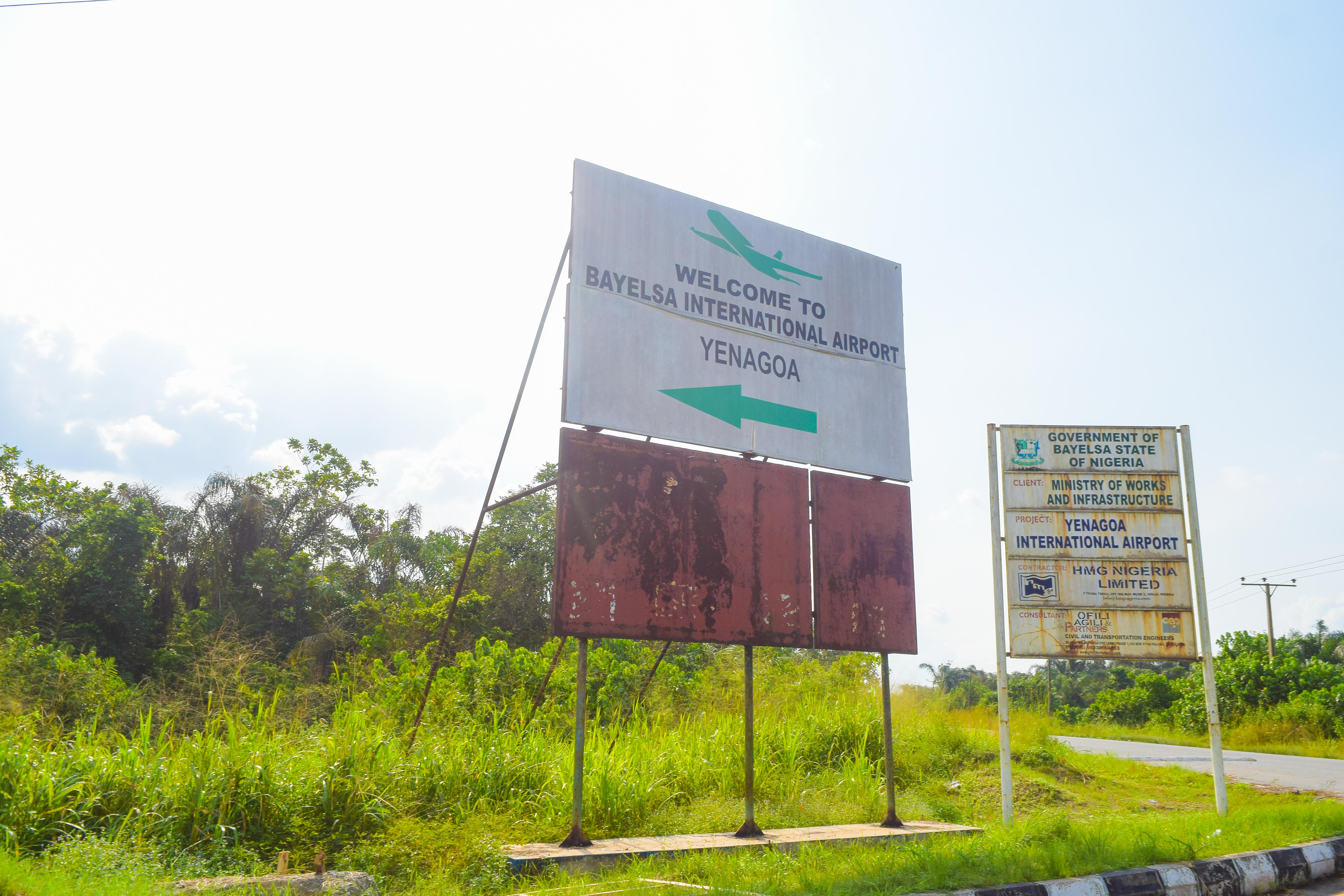

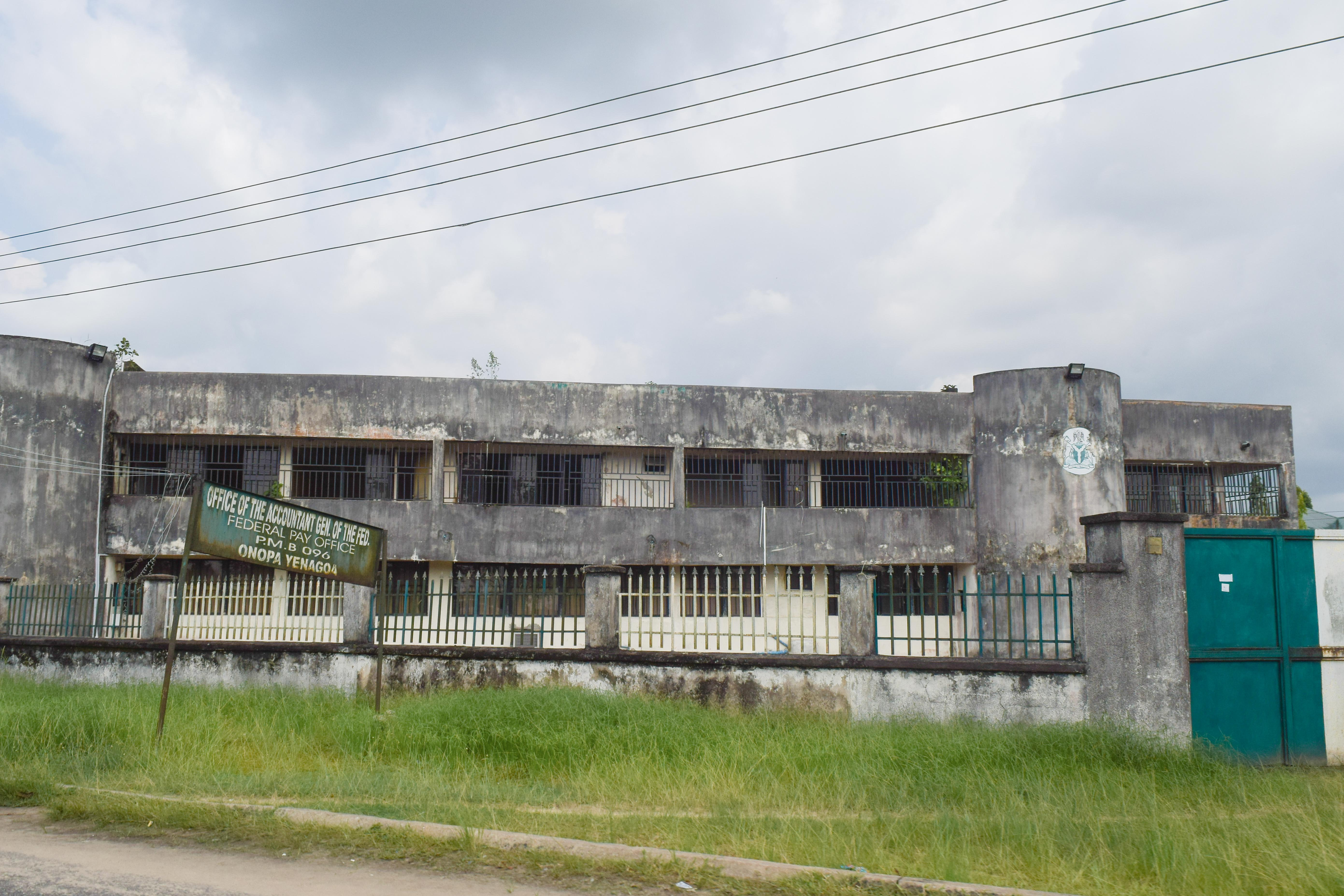

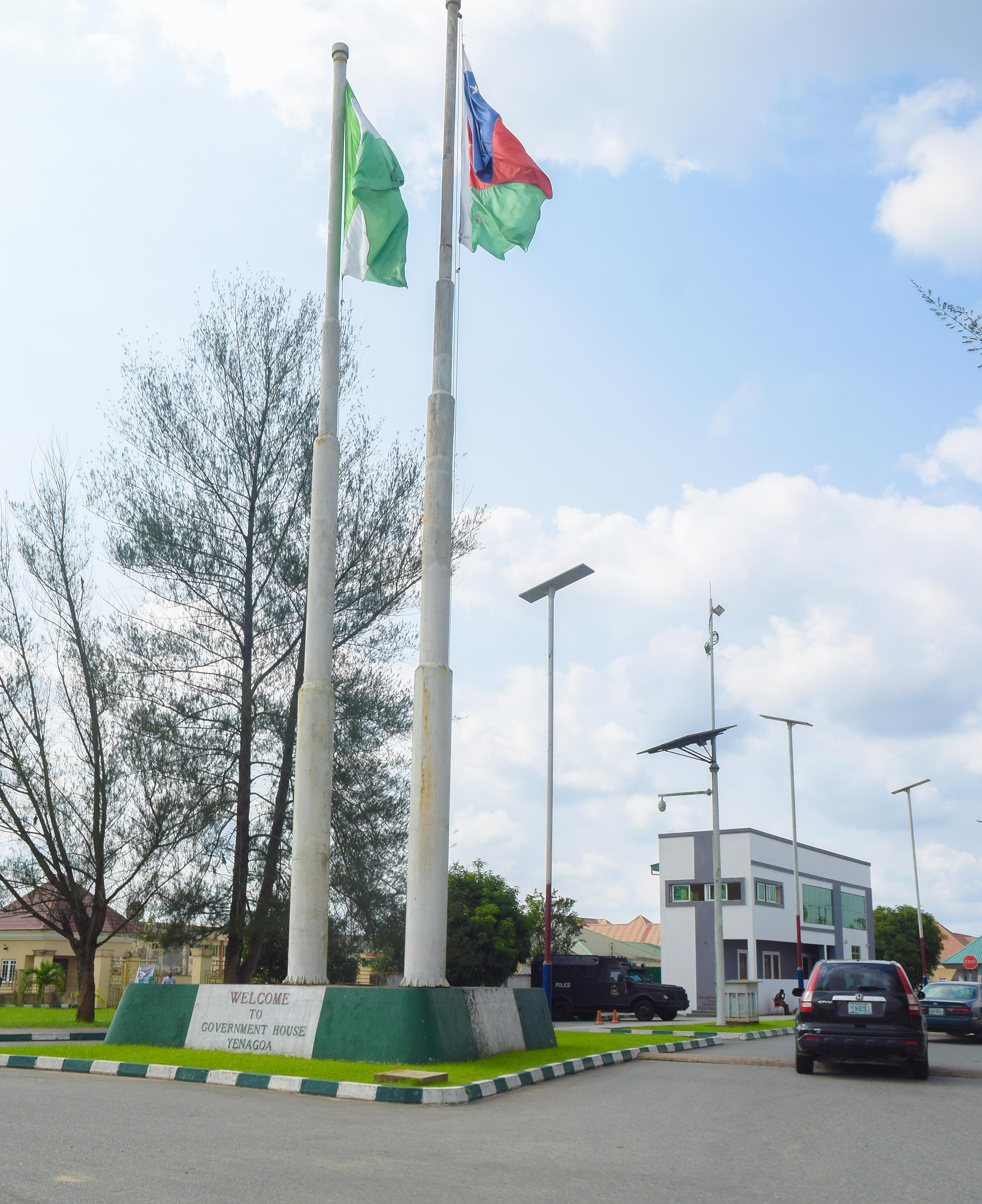

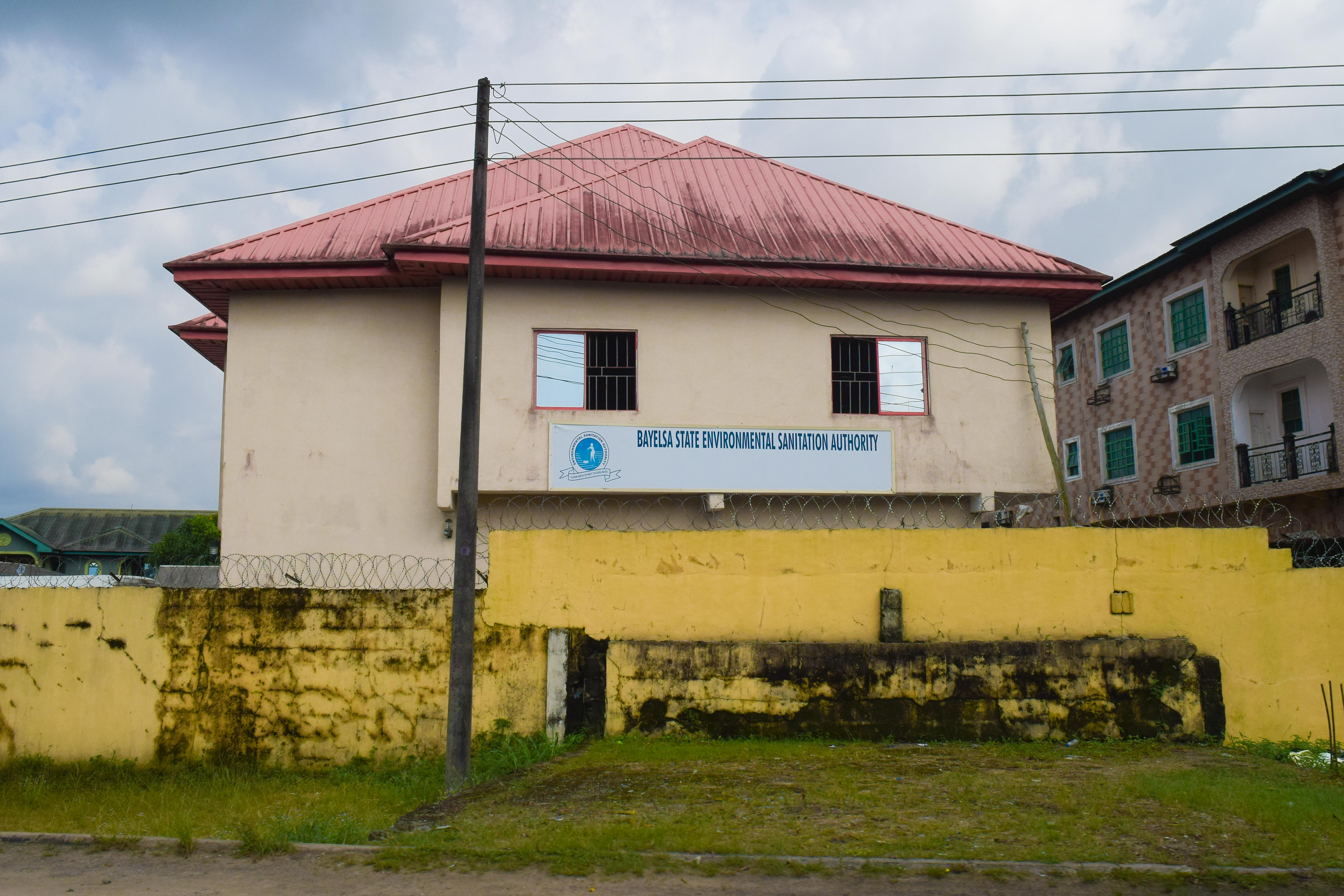

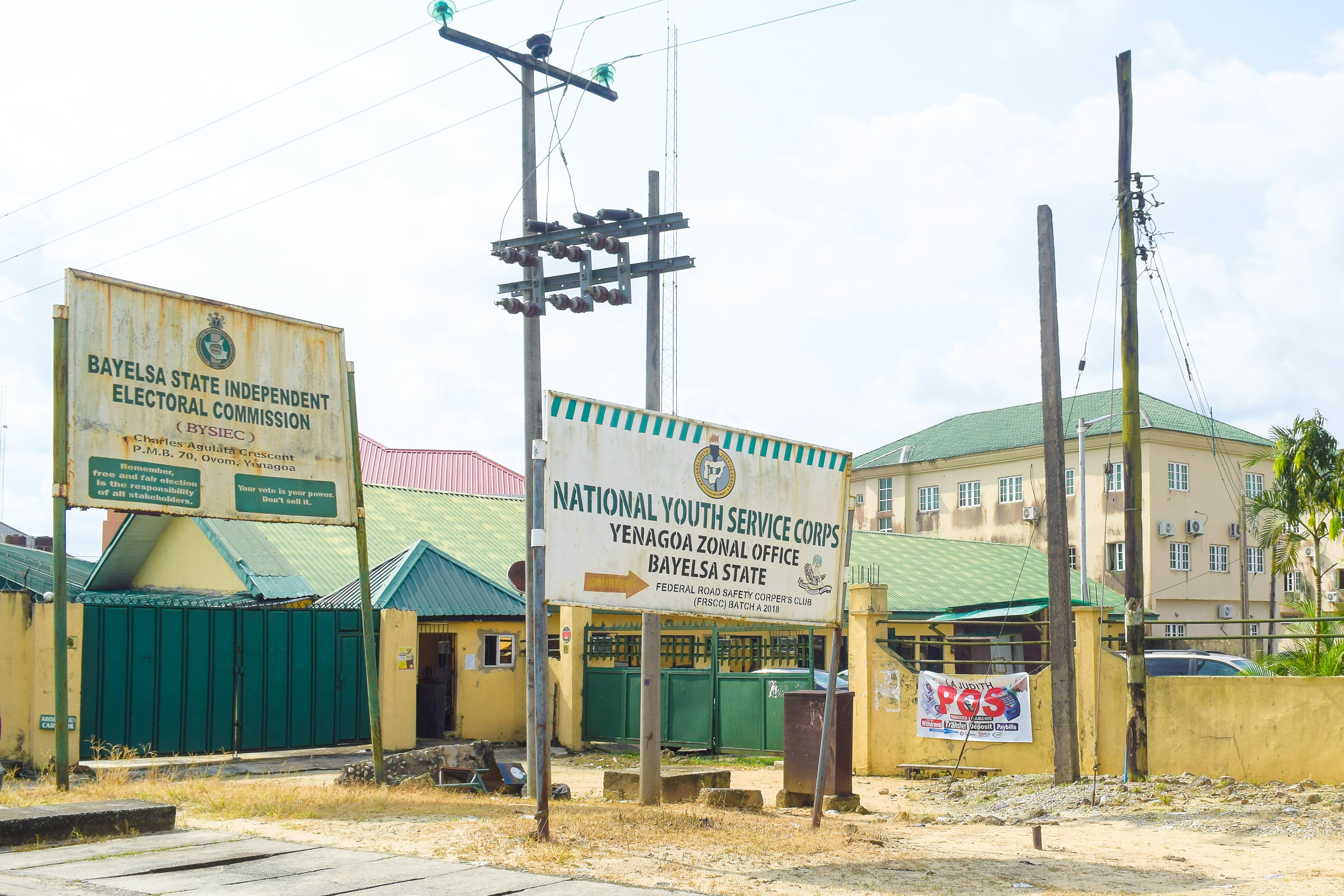

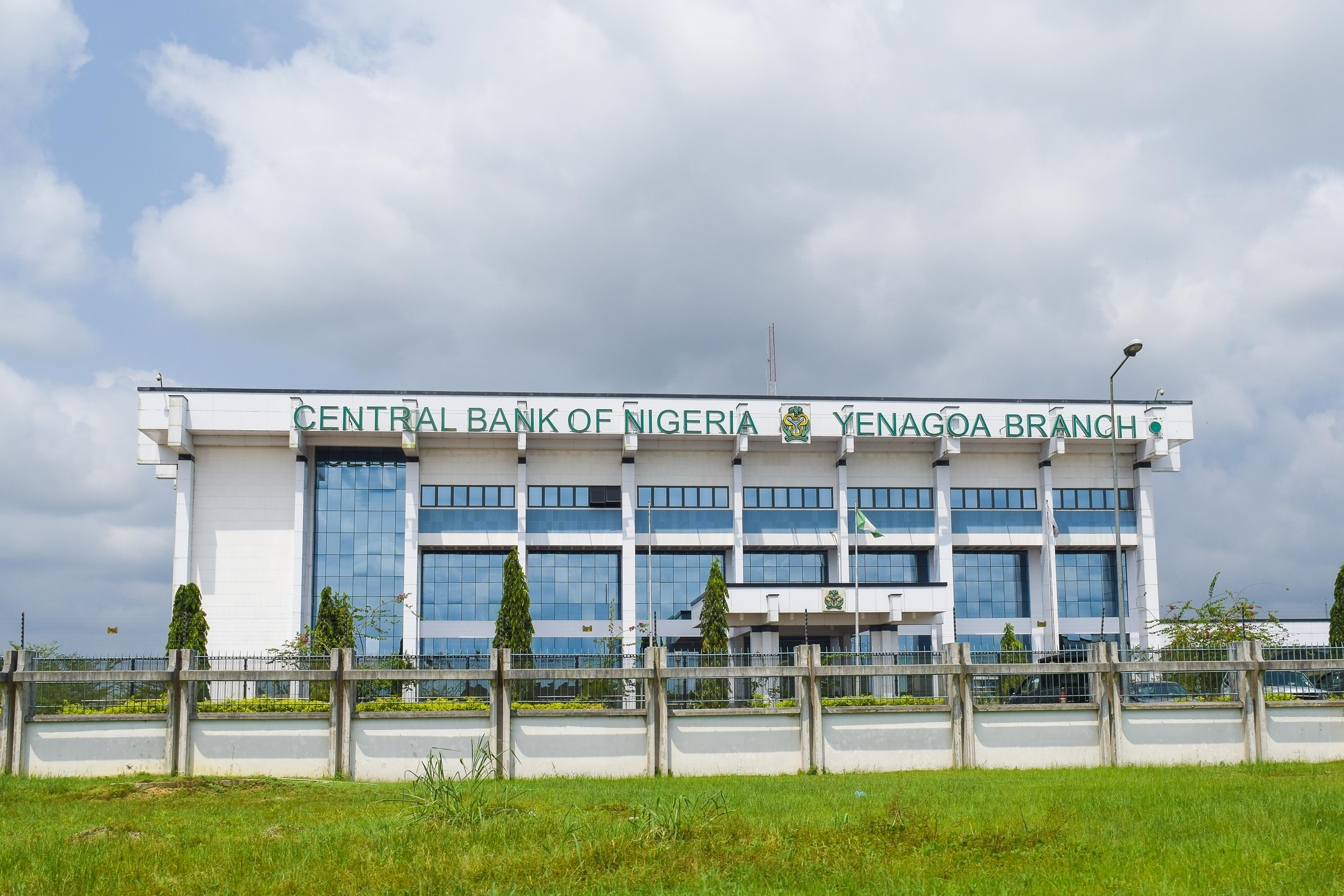

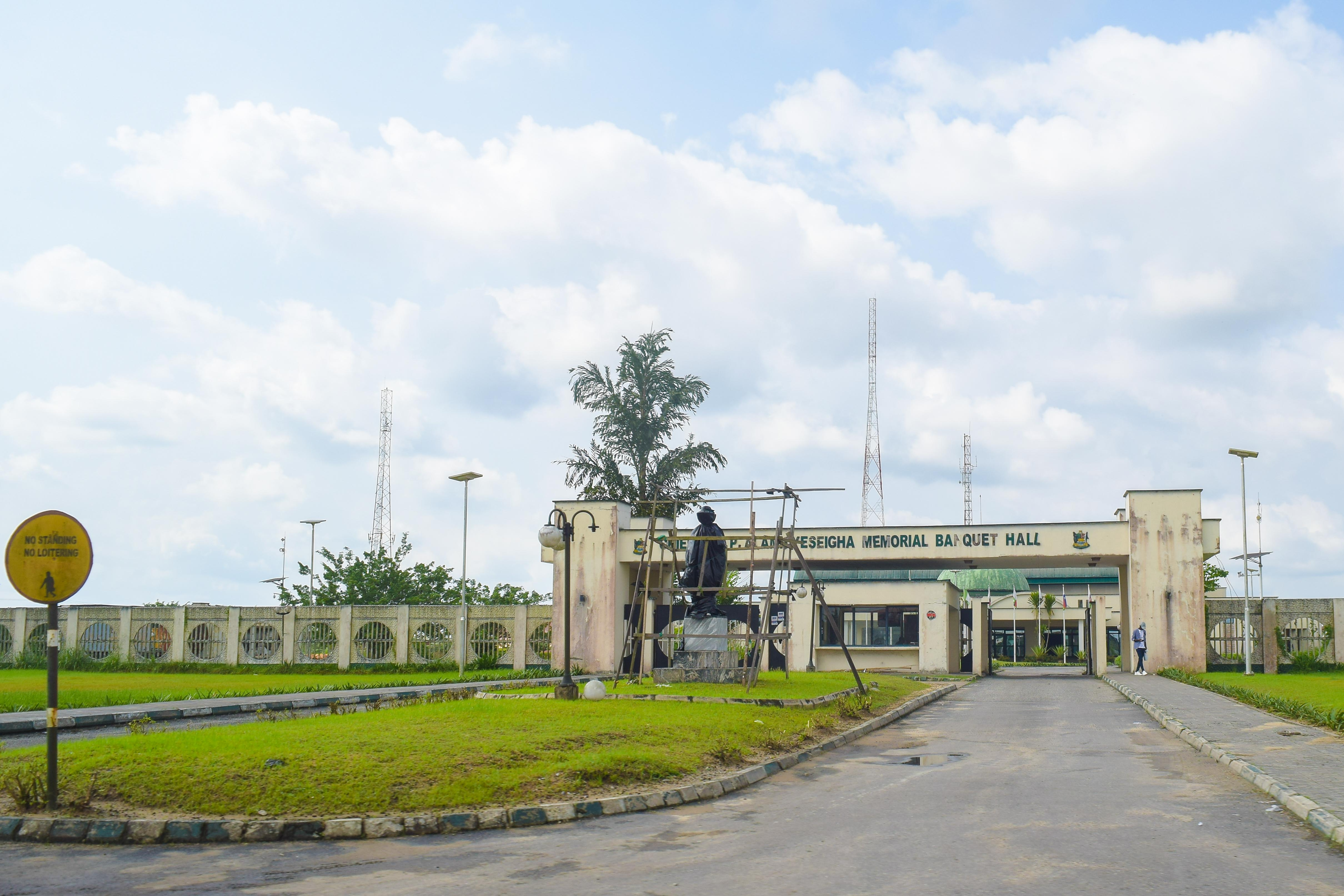

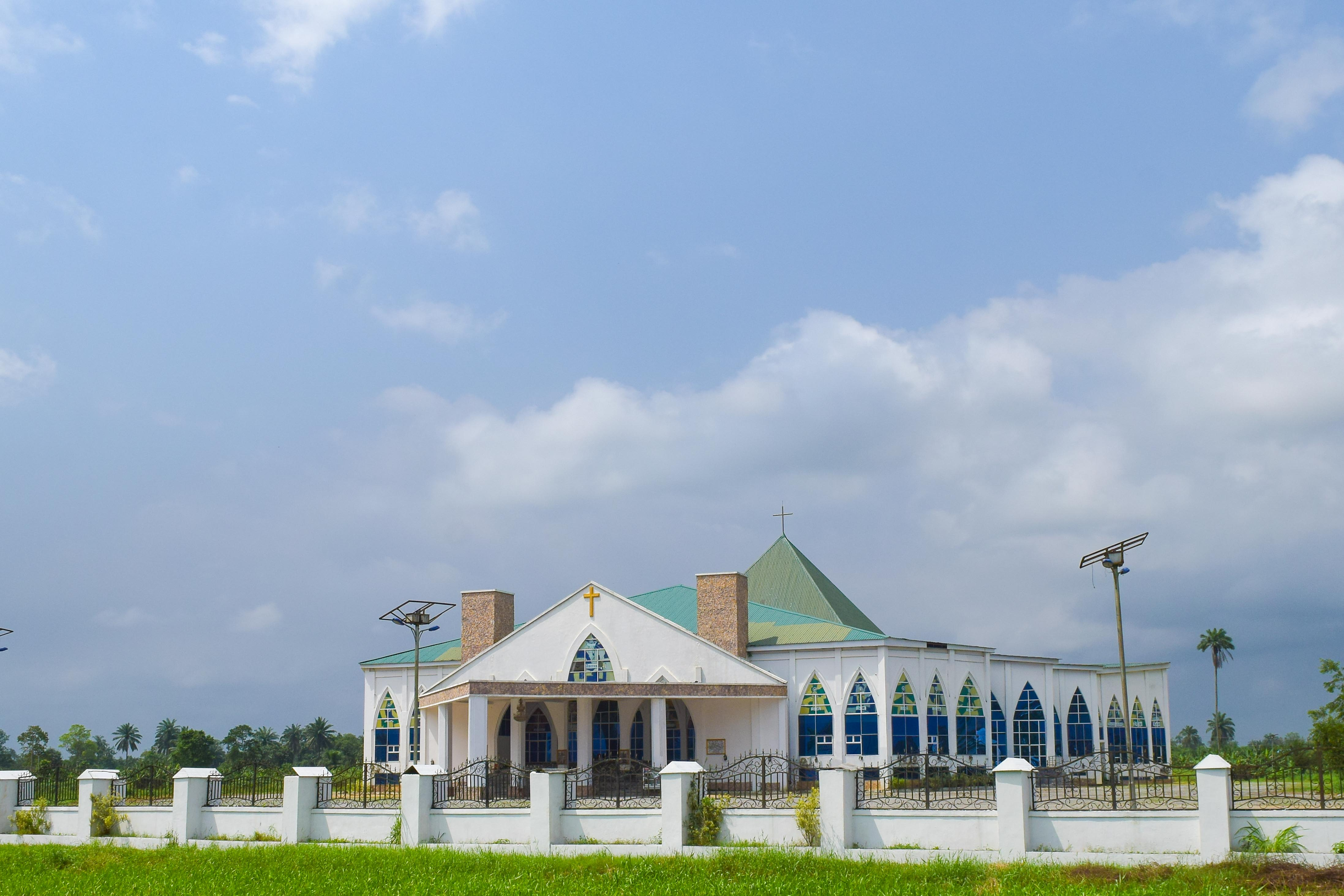

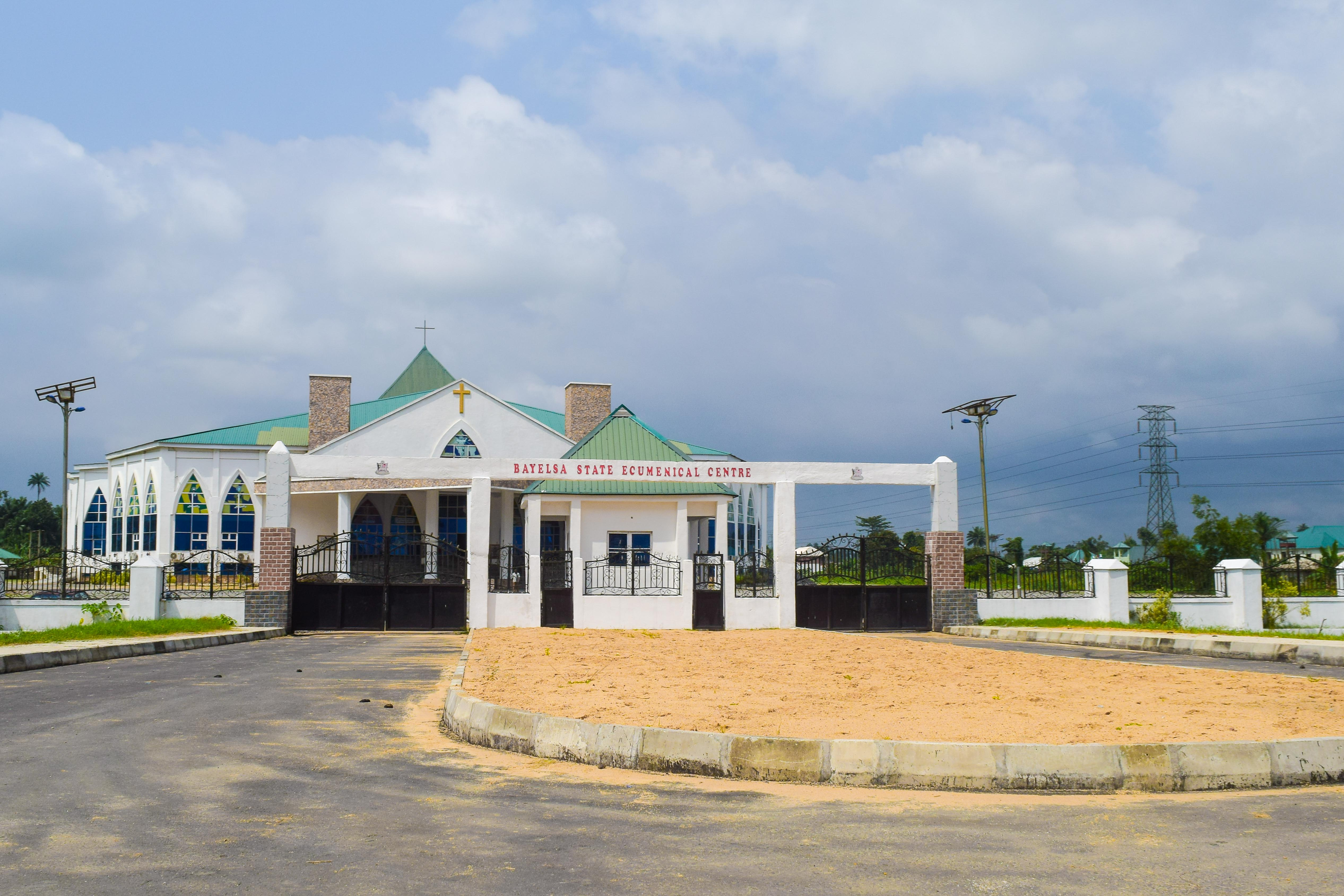

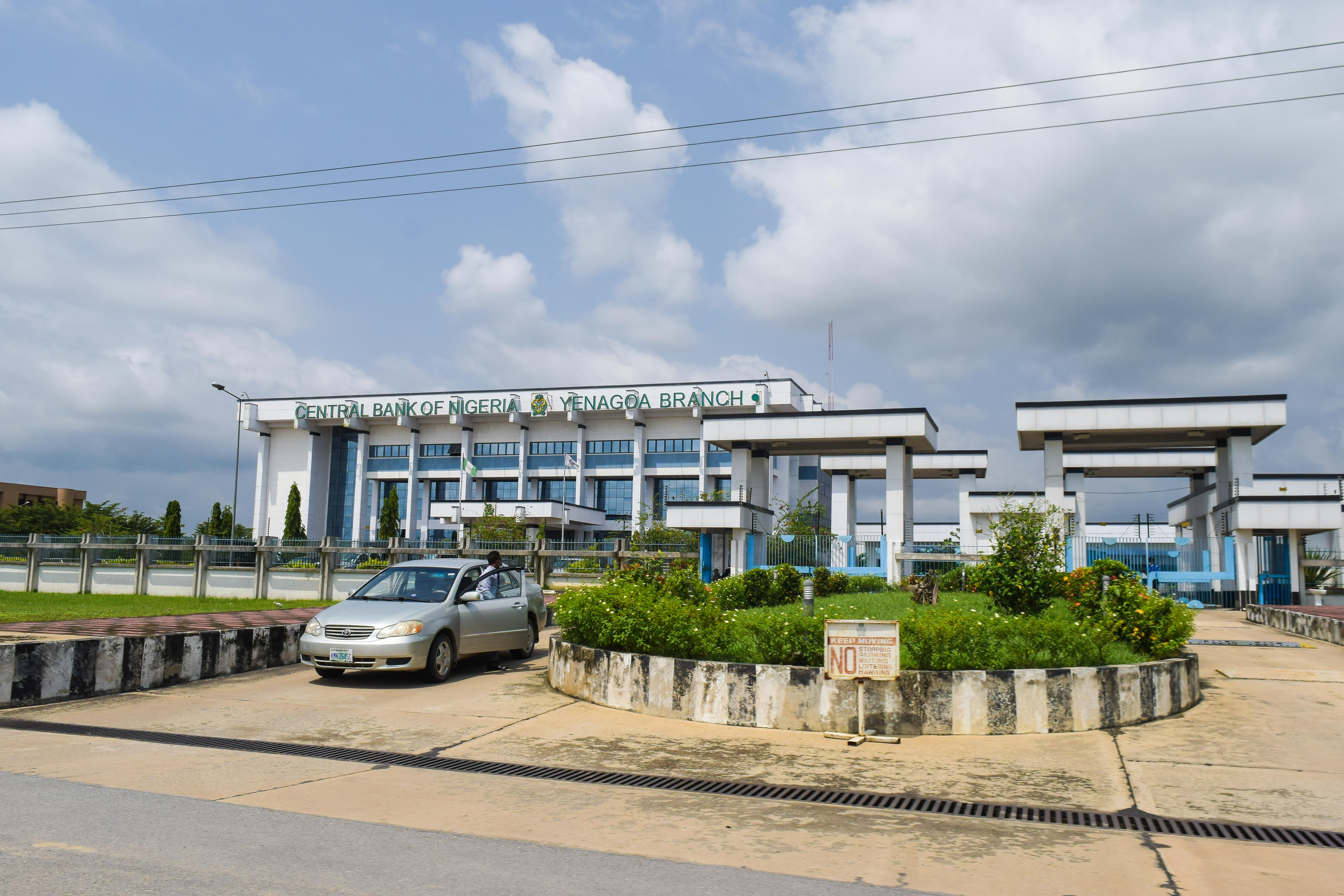

== See also ==
- Federal Medical Centre, Yenagoa
