= Federal University, Otuoke =

Government university in Nigeria

Coordinates: 4.7974°N 6.3283°E

Federal University Otuoke, Bayelsa
- FUO
- Motto: Knowledge, Excellence, Service
- Type: Public
- Established: 2011
- Affiliations: NUC
- Chairman: Sidi Bage Muhammad
- Chancellor: Tunde Samuel
- Vice-Chancellor: Prof. Promise Mebine Charles Teddy Adias
- Academic staff: 650
- Administrative staff: 300
- Students: 11,040 (2021)
- Location: Otuoke, Bayelsa State, Nigeria
- Campus: Urban
- Website: www.fuotuoke.edu.ng

The Federal University Otuoke is a federal government-owned University sited in Otuoke, a town in Ogbia local government area of Bayelsa State, Southern Nigeria. The university is one of the nine new universities established by the Federal Government of Nigeria in February 2011 during the administration of president Dr Goodluck Jonathan. The university is sited in the heart of the oil-rich Niger-Delta Region of Bayelsa State. The university was established in 2011 and started with 282 pioneer students. The university has six faculties and offers degree courses at undergraduate levels, and post-graduate levels, offering Post Graduate Diploma, Masters, and Doctorate degrees.

The university is a Partner of Sustainable Public Procurement. In November 2020, Prof. Teddy Charles Adias was appointed Vice Chancellor of the university.

== Expulsion of students involved in examination malpractice ==
On March 28, 2019, FUOTUOKE expelled 12 students who were involved in cultism and examination malpractice. At the time of the expulsion, five of the students were 200 level while the other seven students were in 300 level. Also, on December 6, 2019, twenty nine students were expelled for their alleged involvement in cultism and examination malpractices.

== Library ==
The faculty libraries and Bruce Powell E-Library has a seating capacity of 1,500 people. The main library, which is the central library of the university, was opened at the establishment of the Federal University Otuoke in 2012 through a decree of the Federal Republic of Nigeria. The Central Library is the centre of library services where the Technical Services (Acquisition, Cataloguing and Classification), the Reading Halls – Arts, Humanities and Social Sciences; Science and Technology; Reference and Serial Collection, Theses and Dissertation, and University and Government Documents are located. The University Bookshop and Library Bindery are also located in the building. The electronic library is located in the Bruce Powell building. The KOHA, eGranary E-resource, and Information Literacy Laboratory are housed in this facility. It has workstations with access to different databases (both subscribed and open access). One can access both open access and subscribed databases.

The Federal University Otuoke Library uses an Integrated Information Network and is connected by a Local Area Network to the Central Library, Bruce Powell e-Library, and all faculty libraries.

== See also ==
- List of universities in Nigeria
- Education in Nigeria
