= Epie language =

Volta–Niger language of Nigeria

Epie
- Native to: Nigeria
- Region: Bayelsa state
- Native speakers: 140,000 (2021)
- Language family: Niger–Congo?: Atlantic–Congo; Volta–Congo; Volta–Niger; yeai; Akpes–Edoid; Edoid; Delta Edoid; Epie

Language codes
- ISO 639-3: epi
- Glottolog: epie1238

Epie (or Epie–Atịsa) is part of Delta Edoid languages spoken in Nigeria by the Epie–Atissa people.

== Phonology ==
The language has a partially reduced system, compared to proto-Edoid, of eight vowels; these form two harmonic sets, /i e a o u/ and /i ɛ a ɔ ʊ/.

Epie has only one clearly phonemic nasal stop, /m/; [n] alternates with [l], depending on whether the following vowel is oral or nasal. (The other approximants, /j ɣ w/, are also nasalized in this position: see Edo language for a similar situation.) The inventory is:

	Labial	Alveolar	Palatal	Velar	Labio-velar
Nasal	m				
Implosive	ɓ	ɗ			
Plosive	p b	t d		k ɡ	k͡p ɡ͡b
Fricative	f v	s z			
Trill		(r)			
Approximant		l [n]	j	ɣ	w
