= Ogbia =

Ogbia Ogbia OGALGA
- LGA and Town
- Interactive map of Ogbia
- Location in Nigeria
- Coordinates: 4°47′N 6°20′E
- Country: Nigeria
- State: Bayelsa State
- Clans: Abureni Clan; Anyama Clan; Oloibiri Clan; Emeyal Clan

Government
  - Traditional Monarchy [Obanobhan]: HRM Dumaro Charles Owaba, Obanobhan III
  - Local Government Chairman: Hon. Golden Jeremiah (PDP)

Area
  - Total: 1,698 km^{2} (656 sq mi)

Population (2024 est)
  - Total: 549,774
  - Density: 323.8/km^{2} (838.6/sq mi)
- Time zone: UTC+1 (WAT)
- 3-digit postal code prefix: 560
- ISO 3166 code: NG.BY.OG

Ogbia is a town, a traditional kingdom and local government area in central Bayelsa State in the Niger Delta region of Nigeria.

Ogbia Kingdom is made up of four clans namely; Abureni Clan, Anyama Clan, Oloibiri Clan and Emeyal Clan.

Ogbia has an area of 695 km^{2} and an estimated population of 549,774 as at 2024. It is well known for its historic value to the today Nigerian state economy mainstay. Crude oil was first discovered in Nigeria, at Oloibiri Town on Sunday 15 January 1956.

The postal code of the area is 562. The Ogbia people speak the Ogbia dialect of the Ijaw Ethnic group. The Ogbia people who inhabit the Ogbia local government of Bayelsa have close kinship and language ties with the Okoroma people of Nembe local government of Bayelsa; the Odual people of Abua/Odual local government of Rivers state as well as the Ogbogolo people of Ahoada-West in Rivers state. The present political headquarters of the Ogbia people, is Ogbia town; a town conceptualized and founded in 1972 by the Ogbia brotherhood. It also serves as the local government headquarters. The inhabitants of Ogbia land are mainly fishermen and farmers. Former Nigerian president Goodluck Ebele Jonathan was born in Otuoke, Ogbia. The first civilian governor of the old Rivers state, Chief Milford Obiene Okilo was also from Emakalakala or Amakalakala in Ogbia. According Alagoa (2009) King Amakiri, the first king of modern Kalabari kingdom (1669–1757) came from Emakalakala in Ogbia.

== Leadership ==
The leadership structure of Ogbia exemplifies a successful integration of traditional and democratic governance, ensuring both cultural preservation and effective administration.

=== Ogbia Kingdom ===
- Traditional Leadership: The Ogbia Kingdom is headed by an Obanobhan (King), currently His Royal Majesty King Dumaro Charles Owaba, Obanobhan III. The kingship rotates among the four clans, promoting inclusivity and representation, with the next monarch expected from the Kolo Creek clan. The Obanobhan fulfills several important roles, such as mediating between the community and the state, preserving Ogbia's cultural traditions, fostering national identity, driving both infrastructure and human capital development, resolving minor disputes, and acting as a stabilizing force in a sometimes inadequate bureaucratic system.

=== Ogbia Local Government Council ===
- Democratic Leadership: The local government council is led by Hon. Golden Jeremiah of the People's Democratic Party (PDP), who was elected as chairman in April 2024.

==== Responsibilities ====
The council functions as the third tier of governance, focusing on efficient operations across all 13 wards in Ogbia. It delivers essential services, including education, elder care, infrastructure maintenance, waste management, and community planning.

== Climate ==
In Ogbia, the year-round weather is stifling, with the wet season being warm and cloudy and the dry season being hot and largely clear. The average annual temperature is between 72 °F and 87 °F; it rarely falls below 64 °F or rises beyond 90 °F.

== Ogbia Communities/Towns ==
- Ogbia
- Imiringi
- Elebele
- Kolo 1
- Kolo 2
- Kolo 3
- Emeyal 1
- Emeyal 2
- Otuasega
- Oruema
- Emakalakala
- Eboh
- Obeduma
- Akipelai
- Otuagbagi
- Otuoke
- Otakeme
- Oloibiri
- Abobiri
- Opume
- Otuogori
- Idema
- Otuokpoti
- Anyama
- Onuebum
- Ewoma
- Otuabulla 1
- Otuabulla 2
- Ologi
- Otuedu
- Okodi
- Ayakoro
- Otuobhi
- Epebu
- Emadike
- Ologehe
- Otuabali
- Otuogidi
- Ebelebiri
- Otabi

== Notable people ==
Ogbia is indeed home to several notable figures who have made significant contributions to Nigeria. These individuals have greatly influenced politics, governance, and development in the region:

- His Excellency, Dr. Goodluck Jonathan, GCFR, GCON: The 14th President of Nigeria.

- Chief Melford Okilo: The first Governor of Rivers State.

- Senator Clever Ikisikpo: Politician and former Senator representing Bayelsa East Senatorial District

- Dr. Eruani Azibapu Godbless: A former Bayelsa Commissioner and Chairman of the Azikiel Group.

- King A.J. Turnah of Opume: Traditional ruler.

- George Turnah: Politician
