= 2023 Nigerian Senate elections in Kogi State =

2023 Senate elections in Kogi

- 25 February 2023

All 3 Kogi State seats in the Senate of Nigeria
	Majority party
Party	APC
Last election	3 (Note: In the regularly scheduled 2019 election for Kogi West, Dino Melaye (PDP) was originally elected Senator and was sworn in alongside other senators in June of that year. However, an August Election Petition Tribunal ruling and October Appeal Court decision annulled the election; the rerun was held in November 2019 and was won by Smart Adeyemi (APC).)
Seats before	3
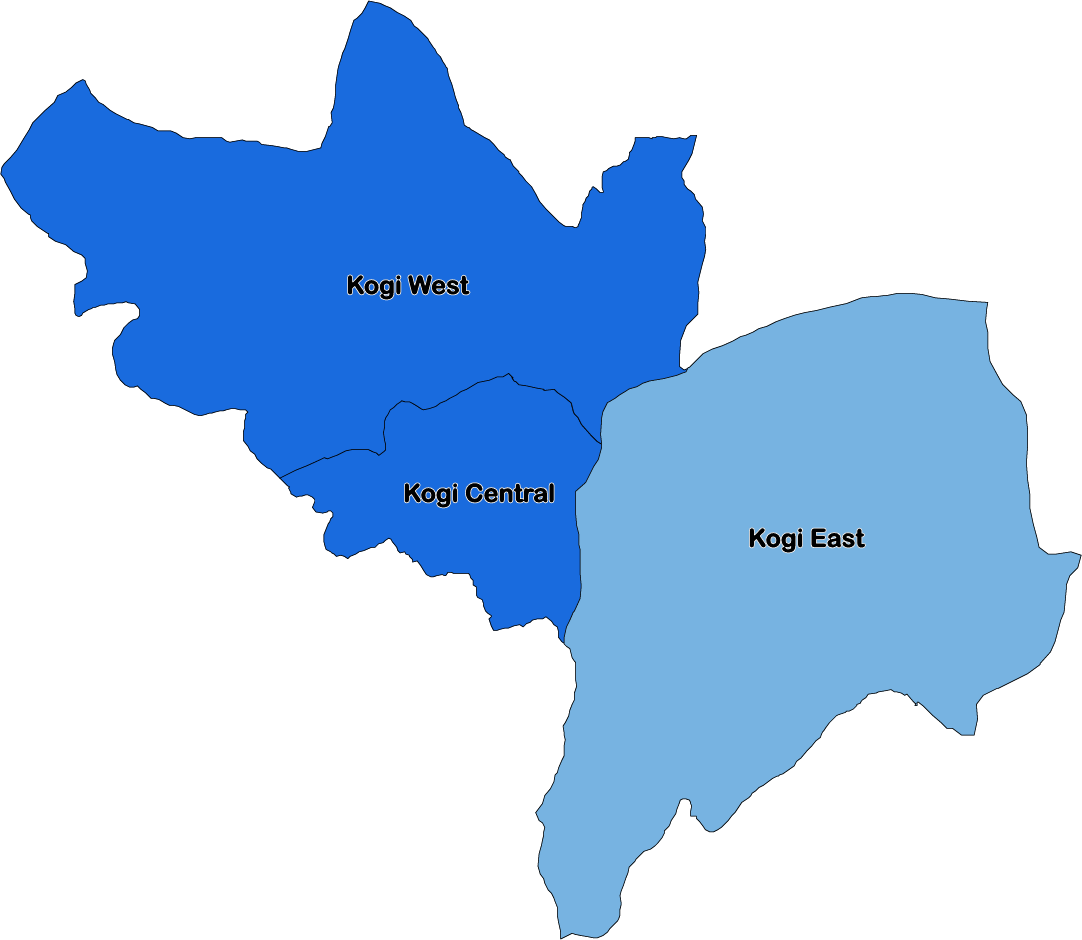
- APC incumbent retiring or lost renomination APC incumbent running for re-election

The 2023 Nigerian Senate elections in Kogi State were held on 25 February 2023, to elect the 3 federal Senators from Kogi State, one from each of the state's three senatorial districts. The elections coincided with the 2023 presidential election, as well as other elections to the Senate and elections to the House of Representatives; with state elections being held two weeks later. Primaries were held between 4 April and 9 June 2022.

== Background ==
In terms of the previous Senate elections, none of the three incumbent senators were returned as Ahmed Ogembe (PDP-Central) lost re-election and Isaac Alfa (PDP-East) retired from the Senate while Dino Melaye (PDP-West) initially was re-elected but lost the rerun election. In the Central district, Yakubu Oseni (APC) unseated Ogembe with 53% of the vote while Jibrin Isah (APC) won the East district with 55%. In the West district, the original election was won by Melaye but it was annulled leading to a rerun election where Smart Adeyemi (APC) took 55% to unseat Melaye. The senatorial results were an example of APC gains in the state as the party also gained several House of Representatives seats; it also won a majority in the House of Assembly and Buhari won the state in the presidential election. Later in 2019, incumbent Governor Yahaya Bello controversially won the gubernatorial election.

== Overview ==
Affiliation	Party	Total
Affiliation	APC	Total
Previous Election	3	3
Before Election	3	3
After Election	3	3

== Summary ==
District	Incumbent		Results	
District	Incumbent	Party	Status	Candidates
Kogi Central	Yakubu Oseni	APC	Incumbent retired New member elected APC hold	▌ ✓ Abubakar Sadiku Ohere (APC); ▌Natasha Akpoti (PDP)
Kogi East	Jibrin Isah	APC	Incumbent re-elected	▌ ✓ Jibrin Isah (APC); ▌Victor Alewo Adoji (PDP)
Kogi West	Smart Adeyemi	APC	Incumbent lost renomination New member elected APC hold	▌ ✓ Sunday Karimi (APC); ▌Tajudeen Yusuf (PDP)

== Kogi Central ==
2023 Kogi Central Senatorial District election
- 25 February 2023
Nominee	Abubakar Sadiku Ohere	Natasha Akpoti
Party	APC	PDP
Senator before election
Yakubu Oseni
APC
Elected Senator
TBD

The Kogi Central Senatorial District covers the local government areas of Adavi, Ajaokuta, Okehi, Okene, and Ogori/Magongo. The district largely corresponds with Ebiraland, the cultural region of the Ebira people; the district also has significant non-Ebira ethnic minorities (mainly Gbagyi and Nupe peoples). Incumbent Yakubu Oseni (APC), who was elected with 52.9% of the vote in 2019, declined to seek re-election.

=== Primary elections ===
==== All Progressives Congress ====
On 20 April 2022, the APC National Executive Committee announced the party's schedule for senatorial primaries, setting its expression of interest form price at ₦3 million and nomination form price at ₦17 million with a 50% discount for candidates younger than 40 while women and candidates with disabilities get free nomination forms. Forms were to be sold from 26 April to 6 May until the deadline was later extended to 10 May then 12 May. After the submission of nomination forms by 13 May, candidates were screened by a party committee on 14 and 15 May while 18 May was the date for the screening appeal process. Ward congresses and LGA congresses were set for 16 and 17 May to elect delegates for the primary. Candidates approved by the screening process advanced to a primary set for 27 May, in concurrence with other APC senatorial primaries; challenges to the result could be made on 28 May.

In late April, reports revealed that Oseni had not purchased primary forms due to Governor Yahaya Bello's endorsement of former commissioner Abubakar Sadiku Ohere for the seat. On the primary date, Ohere was nominated over Ramat Tijani Atta and Dalhatu Sheriff by a wide margin; however, both losing aspirants rejected the process and staged a walkout.

APC primary results
Party	Candidate	Votes	%
APC	Abubakar Sadiku Ohere	260	91.55%
APC	Ramat Tijani Atta	13	4.58%
APC	Dalhatu Sheriff	11	3.87%
Total votes		284	100.00%
Invalid or blank votes		1	N/A
Turnout		285	Unknown

==== People's Democratic Party ====
On 16 March 2022, the national PDP announced its senatorial primary timetable, setting its expression of interest form price at ₦1 million and the nomination form price at ₦20 million with a 50% discount for candidates between 25 and 30. Forms were to be sold until 1 April but the party later extended the deadline four times before reaching a final deadline of 22 April. After the submission of nomination forms by 25 April, candidates were screened by a party committee on 27 April while 2 May was the rescheduled date for the screening appeal process. Ward congresses were set for 29 April and LGA congresses were rescheduled for 10 May to elect delegates for the primary. Candidates approved by the screening process advanced to a primary set for 23 May, in concurrence with other PDP senatorial primaries but due to often violently enforced Monday stay-at-home orders by separatists, southeastern state parties held their primaries on 24 May; challenges to the result could be made on 25 May.

On the primary date, two candidates contested an indirect primary in Okene that ended with Natasha Akpoti—SDP nominee in 2019—winning the nomination after results showed her defeating Adamu Mahmoud Atta by a significant margin. Akpoti had defected from the SDP in March 2022. Although Atta contested the results, a Federal High Court dismissed his lawsuit in August and his appeal was dismissed by an Appeal Court in November.

PDP primary results
Party	Candidate	Votes	%
PDP	Natasha Akpoti	159	92.44%
PDP	Adamu Mahmoud Atta	13	7.56%
Total votes		172	100.00%
Invalid or blank votes		1	N/A
Turnout		173	100.00%

=== Campaign ===
A few weeks after the start of the official campaign period in late September, the senate race rose to national attention due to a public spat between Akpoti and Kogi State Governor Yahaya Bello (APC). The feud began in late October when Okene Local Government Chairman Abdulrazak M. Yusuf (APC) ordered the Okene PDP office to close; sources claimed that it was an order from Bello, who wanted to hurt Akpoti's campaign in her home LGA. The state PDP rejected the order by claiming the order was an unconstitutional infringement on the right to assembly in addition to stating that a local government chairman did not have the right to shutter a building by fiat. Later that week, Bello directly entered the dispute by releasing a statement that called for Akpoti, her husband, and local PDP leaders to be questioned by security forces over alleged ties to terrorism. In response, Akpoti said she was open to questioning but requested that Bello also be invited; she also dismissed the allegations as politically-motivated as the previous APC attack line—that Akpoti was unmarried—no longer worked after her wedding in early 2022.

The contentious campaigning worsened into violence in early December when Akpoti's formal campaign commencement was attacked, injuring multiple people. The Akpoti campaign blamed Bello and the APC, accusing them of sponsoring the assailants. The next month, Akpoti received the endorsement of the Ohinoyi of Ebiraland Abdul Rahman Ado Ibrahim despite a reported threat by Bello against traditional leaders supportive of non-APC candidates. On the day prior to Election Day, the Bello administration destroyed roads leading to Akpoti's hometown in an alleged attempt to prevent INEC officials from reaching the community.

=== General election ===
==== Results ====
2023 Kogi Central Senatorial District election
Party	Candidate	Votes	%
AA	Aminat Suleman Ohuni		
ADP	Audu Omuya Abdulhameed		
ADC	Moshood Ali		
APC	Abubakar Sadiku Ohere		
APGA	Moses Najim		
LP	Yahya Abdul		
NRM	Awalu Wusa		
New Nigeria Peoples Party	Saliu Abdulazeez Anakobe		
PRP	Abdulkadir Tajudeen		
PDP	Natasha Akpoti		
SDP	Peter O. Moses		
ZLP	Fatimoh Suleiman		
Total votes			100.00%
Invalid or blank votes			N/A
Turnout			

== Kogi East ==
2023 Kogi East Senatorial District election
- 25 February 2023
Nominee	Jibrin Isah	Victor Alewo Adoji
Party	APC	PDP
Senator before election
Jibrin Isah
APC
Elected Senator
TBD

The Kogi East Senatorial District covers the local government areas of Ankpa, Bassa, Dekina, Ibaji, Idah, Igalamela-Odolu, Ofu, Olamaboro, and Omala. The district largely corresponds with Igalaland (Anẹ Igáláà), the cultural region of the Igala people; the district also has significant non-Igala ethnic minorities (mainly Agatu, Basa-Komo, Idoma, Igala, and Igbo groups). Incumbent Jibrin Isah (APC), who was elected with 54.5% of the vote in 2019, is seeking re-election.

=== Primary elections ===
==== All Progressives Congress ====
On 20 April 2022, the APC National Executive Committee announced the party's schedule for senatorial primaries, setting its expression of interest form price at ₦3 million and nomination form price at ₦17 million with a 50% discount for candidates younger than 40 while women and candidates with disabilities get free nomination forms. Forms were to be sold from 26 April to 6 May until the deadline was later extended to 10 May then 12 May. After the submission of nomination forms by 13 May, candidates were screened by a party committee on 14 and 15 May while 18 May was the date for the screening appeal process. Ward congresses and LGA congresses were set for 16 and 17 May to elect delegates for the primary. Candidates approved by the screening process advanced to a primary set for 27 May, in concurrence with other APC senatorial primaries; challenges to the result could be made on 28 May.

In the primary, Isah defeated Yahaya Audu—brother of former Governor Abubakar Audu—by a wide margin; however, Audu rejected the results as fabricated and claimed that both him and his agent were denied entry to the primary venue.

APC primary results
Party	Candidate	Votes	%
APC	Jibrin Isah	472	98.74%
APC	Yahaya Audu	6	1.26%
Total votes		478	100.00%
Invalid or blank votes		1	N/A
Turnout		479	Unknown

==== People's Democratic Party ====
On 16 March 2022, the national PDP announced its senatorial primary timetable, setting its expression of interest form price at ₦1 million and the nomination form price at ₦20 million with a 50% discount for candidates between 25 and 30. Forms were to be sold until 1 April but the party later extended the deadline four times before reaching a final deadline of 22 April. After the submission of nomination forms by 25 April, candidates were screened by a party committee on 27 April while 2 May was the rescheduled date for the screening appeal process. Ward congresses were set for 29 April and LGA congresses were rescheduled for 10 May to elect delegates for the primary. Candidates approved by the screening process advanced to a primary set for 23 May, in concurrence with other PDP senatorial primaries but due to often violently enforced Monday stay-at-home orders by separatists, southeastern state parties held their primaries on 24 May; challenges to the result could be made on 25 May.

On the primary date, an indirect primary resulted in Victor Alewo Adoji winning the nomination after results showed him defeating runner-up Aminu Abubakar Suleiman by a significant margin.

PDP primary results
Party	Candidate	Votes	%
PDP	Victor Alewo Adoji	177	60.41%
PDP	Aminu Abubakar Suleiman	54	18.43%
PDP	Ubolo Okpanachi	42	14.33%
PDP	Isaac Alfa	20	6.83%
Total votes		293	100.00%

=== General election ===
==== Results ====
2023 Kogi East Senatorial District election
Party	Candidate	Votes	%
ADP	Moses Itodo		
APP	Sunday Onayi		
ADC	Hilary Edime Amodu		
APC	Jibrin Isah		
LP	Sylvester Pat Amanah		
NRM	Isaiah Davies Ijele		
New Nigeria Peoples Party	Abdullahi Muhammed Abdullahi		
PDP	Victor Alewo Adoji		
SDP	Jacob Egbunu		
YPP	Emmanuel Abbah		
Total votes			100.00%
Invalid or blank votes			N/A
Turnout			

== Kogi West ==
2023 Kogi West Senatorial District election
- 25 February 2023
Nominee	Sunday Karimi	Tajudeen Yusuf
Party	APC	PDP
Senator before election
Smart Adeyemi
APC
Elected Senator
TBD

The Kogi West Senatorial District covers the local government areas of Ijumu, Kabba/Bunu, Kogi, Lokoja, Mopa Muro, Yagba East, and Yagba West. The district largely corresponds with Okunland, the cultural region of the Okun Yoruba subgroup; the district also has significant non-Okun minorities (mainly fellow Yoruba subgroups like the Ogori, Oworo, and Magongo subgroups along with Gbagyi and Nupe ethnicities). In the regularly scheduled 2019 election, Dino Melaye (PDP) won with 53% of the vote and was sworn in as senator in June; however, the election was annulled in August and a rerun was held in November. Smart Adeyemi (APC) was elected with 54.9% of the vote in the rerun election. Adeyemi sought re-election but lost the APC nomination.

=== Primary elections ===
==== All Progressives Congress ====
On 20 April 2022, the APC National Executive Committee announced the party's schedule for senatorial primaries, setting its expression of interest form price at ₦3 million and nomination form price at ₦17 million with a 50% discount for candidates younger than 40 while women and candidates with disabilities get free nomination forms. Forms were to be sold from 26 April to 6 May until the deadline was later extended to 10 May then 12 May. After the submission of nomination forms by 13 May, candidates were screened by a party committee on 14 and 15 May while 18 May was the date for the screening appeal process. Ward congresses and LGA congresses were set for 16 and 17 May to elect delegates for the primary. Candidates approved by the screening process advanced to a primary set for 27 May, in concurrence with other APC senatorial primaries; challenges to the result could be made on 28 May.

The primary, held in Kabba, resulted in Adeyemi losing renomination to Sunday Karimi—former House of Representatives member for Yagba East/Yagba West/Mopamuro. Karimi received 288 votes compared to runner-up Aina's 73 votes and third place Adeyemi's 43 votes. The next month, Adeyemi thanked five delegates for returning his bribes; later that month, Adeyemi rejected the results while claiming that Governor Yahaya Bello tried to force him to withdraw and the primary itself was manipulated.

APC primary results
Party	Candidate	Votes	%
APC	Sunday Karimi	288	69.57%
APC	Muyiwa Aina	73	17.63%
APC	Smart Adeyemi	43	10.39%
APC	Isah Abdulkareem	9	2.17%
APC	Doyin Eshanumi	1	0.24%
Total votes		414	100.00%
Invalid or blank votes		6	N/A
Turnout		420	100.00%

==== People's Democratic Party ====
On 16 March 2022, the national PDP announced its senatorial primary timetable, setting its expression of interest form price at ₦1 million and the nomination form price at ₦20 million with a 50% discount for candidates between 25 and 30. Forms were to be sold until 1 April but the party later extended the deadline four times before reaching a final deadline of 22 April. After the submission of nomination forms by 25 April, candidates were screened by a party committee on 27 April while 2 May was the rescheduled date for the screening appeal process. Ward congresses were set for 29 April and LGA congresses were rescheduled for 10 May to elect delegates for the primary. Candidates approved by the screening process advanced to a primary set for 23 May, in concurrence with other PDP senatorial primaries but due to often violently enforced Monday stay-at-home orders by separatists, southeastern state parties held their primaries on 24 May; challenges to the result could be made on 25 May.

The original primary resulted in a tie between former Senator Dino Melaye and MHR Tajudeen Yusuf with Sam Aro in third position. A rerun primary was held on 24 May with only Melaye and Yusuf as candidates; Yusuf was nominated by a wide margin as Aro-supporting delegates switched to him. Melaye accepted the result and congratulated Yusuf but lamented the "gang-up" against him. Pundits viewed the primary as a proxy battle between two PDP presidential candidates as former Vice President Atiku Abubakar supported Melaye while Rivers State Governor Ezenwo Nyesom Wike backed Yusuf.

PDP rerun primary results
Party	Candidate	Votes	%
PDP	Tajudeen Yusuf	163	62.21%
PDP	Dino Melaye	99	37.79%
Total votes		262	100.00%

=== General election ===
==== Results ====
2023 Kogi West Senatorial District election
Party	Candidate	Votes	%
A	Moses Adeola Eseyin		
ADC	Dele Bello-Williams		
APC	Sunday Karimi		
NRM	Bala Abdulghafar Dirisu		
New Nigeria Peoples Party	Abubakar Muhammad Ibukun		
PDP	Tajudeen Yusuf		
SDP	Abdulrahman Tanko Ndakwo		
YPP	Vance Ayodele Obitomi		
Total votes			100.00%
Invalid or blank votes			N/A
Turnout			

== See also ==
- 2023 Nigerian Senate election
- 2023 Nigerian elections
