= 2019 Nigerian Senate elections in Kogi State =

The 2019 Nigerian Senate election in Kogi State held on February 23, and November 16, 2019. Smart Adeyemi representing Kogi West, Yakubu Oseni representing Kogi Central and Jibrin Isah representing Kogi East all won on the platform of All Progressives Congress, unseating their predecessors in the People's Democratic party.

== Overview ==
Affiliation	Party		Total
Affiliation	APC	PDP	Total
Before Election	0	3	3
After Election	3	0	3

== Summary ==
District	Incumbent	Party	Elected Senator	Party
Kogi West	Dino Melaye	PDP	Smart Adeyemi	APC
Kogi Central	Ahmed Ogembe	PDP	Yakubu Oseni	APC
Kogi East	Isaac Alfa	PDP	Isah Jibrin	APC

== Results ==
=== Kogi West ===
A total of 24 candidates registered with the Independent National Electoral Commission to contest in the election. APC candidate Smart Adeyemi won the election and the re-run polls, defeating PDP candidate Dino Melaye and 22 other party candidates. Adeyemi received 54.86% of the votes, while Melaye received 38.57%

2019 Nigerian Senate election in Kogi State
Party	Candidate	Votes	%
APC	Smart Adeyemi	88,373	54.86%
PDP	Dino Melaye	62,133	38.57%
Others		10,589	6.57%
Total votes		166,095	100%
APC hold			

=== Kogi Central ===
A total of 19 candidates registered with the Independent National Electoral Commission to contest in the election. APC candidate Yakubu Oseni won the election, defeating PDP candidate Ahmed Ogembe, SDP Akpoti Natasha Hadiza and 16 other party candidates. Oseni received 52.87% of the votes, Akpoti received 33.35% while Ogembe received 12.73%.

2019 Nigerian Senate election in Kogi State
Party	Candidate	Votes	%
APC	Yakubu Oseni	76,183	52.87%
PDP	Ahmed Ogembe	18,349	12.73%
SDP	Natasha Akpoti	48,056	33.35%
Others		1,505	1.05%
Total votes		144,093	100%
APC hold			

=== Kogi East ===
A total of 24 candidates registered with the Independent National Electoral Commission to contest in the election. APC candidate Jibrin Isah won the election, defeating PDP candidate Ali Atai Aidoko Usman and 22 other party candidates. Jibrin received 54.50% of the votes, while Aidoko received 30.13%.

2019 Nigerian Senate election in Kogi State
Party	Candidate	Votes	%
APC	Jibrin Isah	134,189	54.50%
PDP	Ali Atai Aidoko Usman	74,201	30.13%
Others		37,830	15.37%
Total votes		246,220	100%
APC hold			

== Re-run Elections ==
The November 16, election in Kogi West was declared inconclusive due to voting irregularities. A re-run election was held on November 30, 2019, and Smart Adeyemi of the PDP emerged winner.
