= Ado Ibrahim =

Nigerian traditional ruler (1929–2023)

AbdulRahman Adogu Ibrahim
- His Royal Majesty

Paramount ruler of Ebiraland
- In office: 1997–2023
- Coronation: Okene, Kogi State, Nigeria
- Predecessor: Sanni Omolori
- Born: 7 February 1929
- Died: 29 October 2023 (aged 94); Abuja, Nigeria
- Burial: Azad Palace,
- Issue: Malik, Azad
Names
- AbdulRahman Ado Ibrahim
- House: Omadivi
- Father: Attah Ibrahim Onoruoiza
- Religion: Islam
- Occupation: • Ohinoyi • businessman

Abdulrahman Ado Ibrahim (7 February 1929 – 29 October 2023) was the fourth traditional ruler and Ohinoyi of Ebiraland, a traditional state with headquarters in Okene, Kogi State, Middle Belt, Nigeria. He was a son of the second attah (now "ohinoyi") of Ebiraland, Ibrahim Onoruoiza, of the Omadivi clan, who reigned from 1917 to 1954.

== Early years and education ==
Ibrahim was born on 7 February 1929. He attended both western nursery and Quranic schools. He went on to conclude his primary education in 1940 at the Native Authority (NA) primary school in Okene, Northern Region (now Kogi State). He began his secondary school education at Ondo Boys High School and later moved to Oduduwa College, where he graduated in 1949. In 1954, he obtained a bachelor's degree in Economics from the London School of Economics and a master's degree from Harvard Business School in 1959.

== Enthronement ==
Following the death of Ohinoyi Sanni Omolori of the Oziada clan in 1997, the Lagos-based entrepreneur and son of the second paramount ruler of Ebiraland, Abdulrahman Ado Ibrahim, ascended the Okene throne as the second Ohinoyi or fourth independent traditional ruler of Ebiraland on 2 June 1997.

Ibrahim constructed the Azad Palace, named after one of his sons, said to be among the most beautiful in West Africa.

== Friction with state government ==
Ibrahim was reportedly issued a query by the Kogi State Government, following his inability to grant the Nigerian President Muhammadu Buhari a welcome during the latter's visit to the state, on 29 December 2022. It was reported that a bomb exploded during the president's visit at a mosque close to the palace of the ohinoyi in Okene, killing about three persons. On 3 January 2023, the Nigerian police Department of State Security (DSS) was said to have arrested the bomb blast masterminds who were members of the ISWAP, which released a video a day before the arrests, reportedly stating that the attack was undertaken by "soldiers of the caliphate". Ibrahim in his reply to the query on 12 January 2022, addressed to the State Commissioner for Local Government and Chieftaincy Affairs, stated that he did not receive an official notification and was unaware of the construction of another palace which was part of the projects to be commissioned by the president, other than the one he had been residing in since his coronation in 1997. In addition, he stated that as he prepared to go to meet the president, the bomb incident happened and his palace entrance got barricaded, thus his inability to go out and meet the president before the latter left for Lokoja.

Earlier in December 2022, Ibrahim declared his support for Natasha Akpoti-Uduaghan of the PDP vying for the Kogi Central Senatorial District ultimate position. That notwithstanding, the state government as of then and currently is being run by an opposition party, the APC.

== Royal family ==
One of Ibrahim's children, Prince Malik Ado-Ibrahim, was as of 7 January 2023, the presidential candidate of the Young Progressives Party (YPP) towards the upcoming elections in Nigeria.

== Death ==
Ado Ibrahim died in Abuja on 29 October 2023, at the age of 94.

Ado Ibrahim Omadivi Royal House Born: 7 February 1929 Died: 29 October 2023
Regnal titles
Preceded by Sanni Omolori	Ohinoyi Ebira; 1997–2023	Succeeded by Ahmed Tijani Anaje
