= 2015 Nigerian Senate elections in Kogi State =

2015 Nigerian Senate election in Kogi State

The 2015 Nigerian Senate election in Kogi State was held on March 28, 2015, to elect members of the Nigerian Senate to represent Kogi State. Atai Aidoko representing Kogi East and Mohammed Ohiare representing Kogi Central won on the platform of the All Progressive Congress, but overturned by the courts to Ahmed Ogembe of the People's Democratic Party while Dino Melaye representing Kogi West won on the platform of All Progressives Congress.

== Overview ==
Affiliation	Party		Total
Affiliation	PDP	APC	Total
Before Election			3
After Election	2	1	3

== Summary ==
District	Incumbent	Party	Elected Senator	Party
Kogi East			Atai Aidoko	PDP
Kogi Central			Ogembe Ahmed	PDP
Kogi West			Dino Melaye	APC

== Results ==
=== Kogi East ===
Peoples Democratic Party candidate Atai Aidoko won the election, defeating All Progressives Congress candidate Abdulrahman Abubakar and other party candidates.

2015 Nigerian Senate election in Kogi State
Party	Candidate	Votes	%
PDP	Atai Aidoko		
APC	Abdulrahman Abubakar		
Total votes			
PDP hold			

=== Kogi Central ===
Peoples Democratic Party candidate Ogembe Ahmed won the election, defeating All Progressives Congress candidate Mohammed Abdulsalami and other party candidates.

2015 Nigerian Senate election in Kogi State
Party	Candidate	Votes	%
PDP	Ogembe Ahmed		
APC	Mohammed Abdulsalami		
Total votes			
PDP hold			

=== Kogi West ===
All Progressives Congress candidate Dino Melaye won the election, defeating Peoples Democratic Party candidate Smart Adeyemi and other party candidates.

2015 Nigerian Senate election in Kogi State
Party	Candidate	Votes	%
APC	Dino Melaye		
PDP	Smart Adeyemi		
Total votes			
APC hold			
