= Sunday Karimi =

Nigerian politician

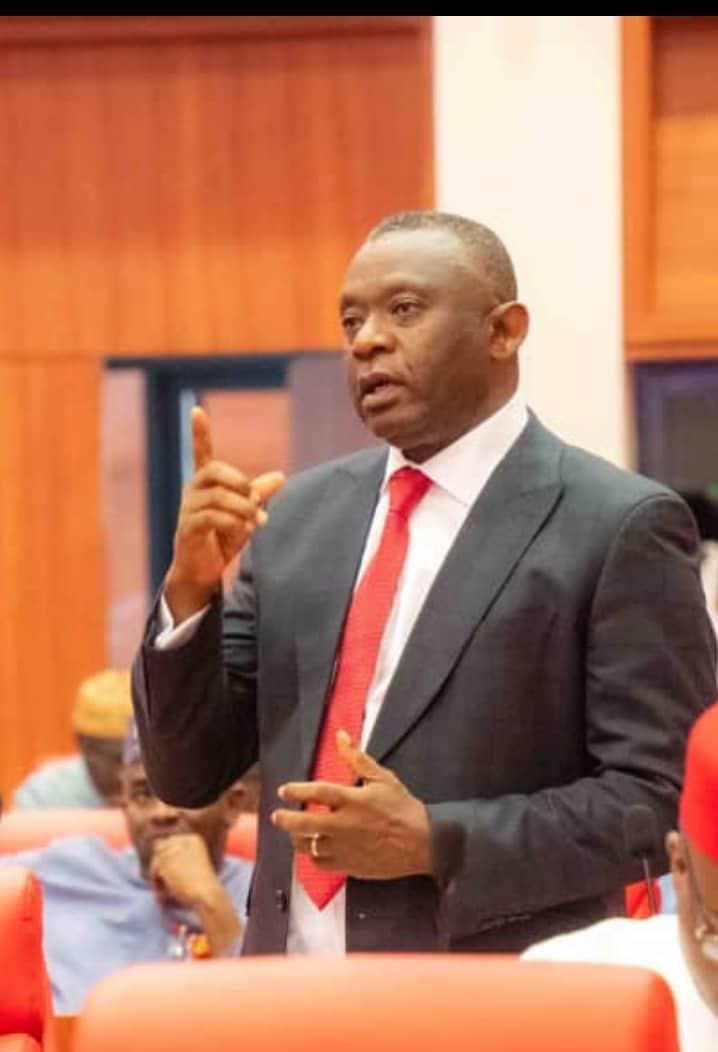
- Senator Sunday Karimi during a bill presentation on the floor of the Nigerian Senate

Senator for Kogi West
- Incumbent
- Assumed office June 2023
- Preceded by: Smart Adeyemi

Chairman of the Committee on Senate Services
- In office 12 June 2007 – 6 June 2011

Member of the House of Representatives of Nigeria from Kogi
- In office June 2011 – June 2019
- Preceded by: Samuel Aro Bamidele
- Succeeded by: Leke Joseph
- Constituency: Yagba East/Yagba West/Mopamuro

Personal details
- Party: All Progressives Congress
- Other political affiliations: People's Democratic Party (2011 to 2019)
- Website: Official website

Sunday Steve Karimi is a Nigerian politician and senator representing Kogi West Senatorial District, Kogi State. Karimi is the Chairman of the Committee on Senate Services.

From 2011 to 2019, Karimi was the member representing Yagba East/Yagba West/Mopamuro constituency in the House of Representatives.

In October 2023, Karimi explained in an interview with Channels TV that the Senate needed to buy imported Sports Utility Vehicles for its 109 members because "most of our roads are terribly bad." When challenged by interviewer Seun Okinbaloye, he defended his position by saying, "Somebody that is a minister has more than three Land Cruisers, Prado, and other vehicles, and you are not asking them questions; why us?"

== Early life and education ==
He was born in Egbe, Yagba West Local Government, Kogi State. He studied Production Engineering at Kwara State College of Technology, Ilorin, Kwara State, where he bagged a distinction in 1979.

He received training at the famous Titcombe College, Egbe, which was established by the Sudan Interior Mission (SIM), and later became a key player in Nigeria's water resources sector.

== Political life ==
In a keenly contested primary election, Karimi rode on the support of incumbent governor Yahaya Bello to clinch the ticket of the All Progressive Congress where he emerged as the party's candidate in the 2023 senatorial elections in Kogi state after defeating the sitting Senator Smart Adeyemi of the same political party.

He proceeded to contest in the general elections where he defeated his closest rival, Tajudeen Yusuf of the Peoples Democratic Party (PDP) to emerge as the senator representing Kogi West Senatorial District

Sunday Karimi once cautioned Mohammed Ali Ndume on the floor of the Senate, to do as he preaches when admonishing other leaders. Particularly on issues related to security, as leaders are expected to lead from the front

=== Bills and motions sponsored ===
Sunday Karimi has sponsored several bills and moved motions both in the house of representatives and in the senate. One of such is a bill seeking to bar the governor and deputy governors of the Central Bank of Nigeria (CBN) from participating in politics which passed second reading at the Senate in 2023.

== Community development ==
As part of efforts to address the rising insecurity in Kogi West senatorial district of Kogi State, Senator Sunday Karimi has constructed and handed over a fully furnished and equipped military base to the Nigerian Army authorities.

The military base is located in the outskirts of Egbe, Yagba West local government area of the State.

Sunday Karimi, facilitated the construction of New 75 Number solar-powered boreholes and the rehabilitation of another 60 Number moribund Water Schemes across communities in Kogi West. The project, valued at the cost of N1.24 billion.
