= Abubakar Sadiku Ohere =

Nigerian politician

Distinguished Senator Ohere Sadiku Abubakar
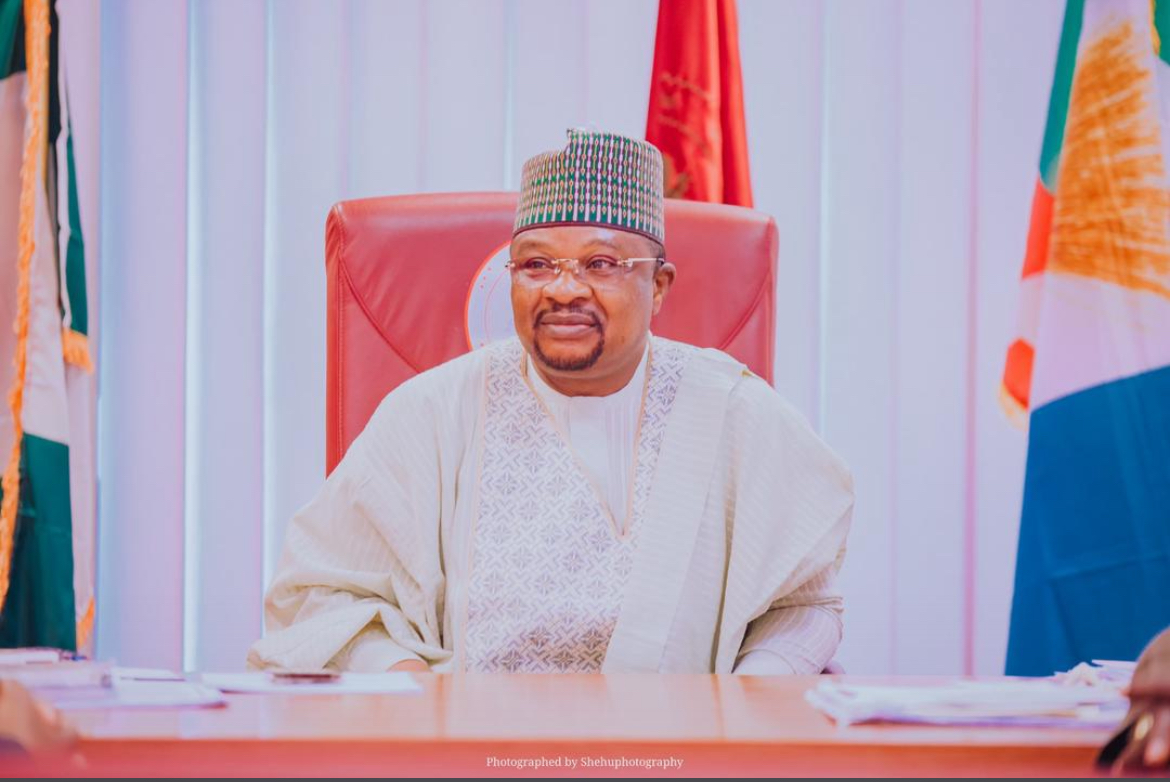

Senator for Kogi Central Chairman Senate Committee on Local Content
- In office June 2023 – November 2023
- Preceded by: Yakubu Oseni

Special Adviser on Local Government and Chieftaincy Affairs
- In office January 2016 – August 2019
- Governor: Yahaya Bello

Commissioner for Local Government and Chieftaincy Affairs
- In office August 2019 – December 2019

Commissioner for Works and Housing
- In office 27 January 2020 – 16 April 2022

Personal details
- Born: 13 July 1966 (age 60) Okene, Kogi State, Nigeria
- Party: All Progressives Congress
- Occupation: Engineer, politician
- Website: abubakarohere.com

Ohere Sadiku Abubakar FNSE, (born July 13, 1966) is a Nigerian politician. He is from the Okene LGA in Kogi State. From January 2016 to December 2019, he held two significant roles in the Kogi State government, beginning as the Special Adviser of the Ministry of Local Government and Chieftaincy Affairs, before being appointed as the Commissioner for the Ministry of Local Government and Chieftaincy Affairs. In January 2020, with the commencement of the second term of Yahaya Bello, he was re-appointed to serve as the Commissioner for Works and Housing.

== Early life and education ==
Ohere Sadiku Abubakar was born on July 13, 1966, in Okene LGA, Kogi State. He was enrolled at St. Andrew's School, Okene in 1975 for his primary education. In 1979, he proceeded to Lennon Memorial College, Ageva, for his secondary education. He thereafter obtained an Ordinary National Diploma in Metallurgical Engineering from Kwara State Polytechnic, Ilorin, and continued to the Federal Polytechnic, Idah, in 1992 for his Higher National Diploma. He has a master's degree in mining engineering (M.Eng.) from the Federal University of Technology Akure.

== Civil Service ==
Ohere joined the Federal Civil Service in 1996. His working career spanned about 20 years, beginning as a field engineer and gradually rising to the management level in the Federal Ministry of Mines and Steel Development.

== Political career ==
A political appointment in January 2016 led to a pause in Ohere's civil service career as he accepted the role to serve under the New Direction Government of governor Yahaya Bello from January 2016 to August 2019 as a Special Adviser, overseeing the affairs of the Ministry of Local Government and Chieftaincy Affairs. In 2019, he was appointed Honorable Commissioner, Ministry of Local Government and Chieftaincy Affairs, until December 2019, with the same functions of overseeing the affairs of the Ministry. In January 2020, at the inception of the second governorship of Yahaya Bello, he was appointed again into his cabinet to serve as the Honorable Commissioner for Works and Housing, a position he voluntarily resigned from on the 16th day of April 2022, to participate as a candidate in the senatorial elections for Kogi Central Senatorial District in the Federal Legislature.

Ohere was initially declared the winner of the 2023 Kogi Central Senatorial Election on February 25, 2023 by the Independent National Electoral Commission, but he spent less than seven months in the Nigerian Senate, as this electoral victory was overturned on October 31, 2023 by the Court of Appeal in Abuja, and his opponent Natasha Akpoti of the People's Democratic Party was declared as the rightful winner of the elections.

== Senatorial timeline ==
- February 27, 2023 - Declared by INEC as Senator Elect Kogi Central Senatorial District.
- June 13, 2023 - Inaugurated as Member of the 10th Senate of the Federal Republic of Nigeria.
- July, 2023 - Appointed Chairman Senate Committee on Local Content alongside membership in Senate Committees of Works, Solid Minerals, FCT, Health etc.
- Member Senate Ad hoc Committee on East–West Roads.
- Vacates seat November 2023.

== Fellowships and memberships ==
- Fellow of the Nigerian Society of Engineers (NSE)
- Fellow of the Institute of Industrialists and Corporate Administrators (IICA)
- Corporate Member of the Nigerian Society of Mining Engineers (NSME)
- Member of the Council for the Regulation of Engineering in Nigeria (COREN)
- Member of the Council of Nigerian Mining Engineers and Geoscientists (COMEG)
