= Ahmed Tijani Ahmed =

Nigerian politician

Senator of the Federal Republic of Nigeria
- In office May 1999 – May 2003
- Succeeded by: Mohammed Ohiare
- Constituency: Kogi Central

Personal details
- Born: 17 December 1941
- Died: 10 June 2006 (aged 64)
- Party: People's Democratic Party (PDP)

Ahmed Tijani Ahmed (17 December 1941 – 10 June 2006) was a Nigerian politician who was Senator for the Kogi Central constituency in Kogi State from 1999 to 2003 as a member of the People's Democratic Party (PDP).

== Career ==
When Kogi State was created in 1991, Ahmed Tijani Ahmed joined a group of liberal progressive politicians in the Social Democratic Party (SDP) that created an agreement on power sharing among the different peoples of the state. However, they lost the December 1991 governorship election to the National Republican Convention (NRC). Abubakar Audu of the NRC was elected and held office until General Sani Abacha assumed power in November 1993.

After the return to democracy in 1998, Ahmed aspired to become PDP candidate for the governorship of Kogi State, competing with Steve Achema and others. However, the PDP selected an Okun, Steve Oloruntoba, as a compromise candidate. Ahmed asked his Ebira supporters to vote for the All People's Party governorship candidate, Prince Abubakar Audu, rather than Steve Oloruntoba, which they did. Audu was elected for a second term as governor.

Disappointed in his ambition to become governor, Ahmed ran for a seat in the Senate, which he won, taking office in May 1999. He was appointed head of the senate services committee, which reportedly agreed to share certain contracts among principal officers and committee members.

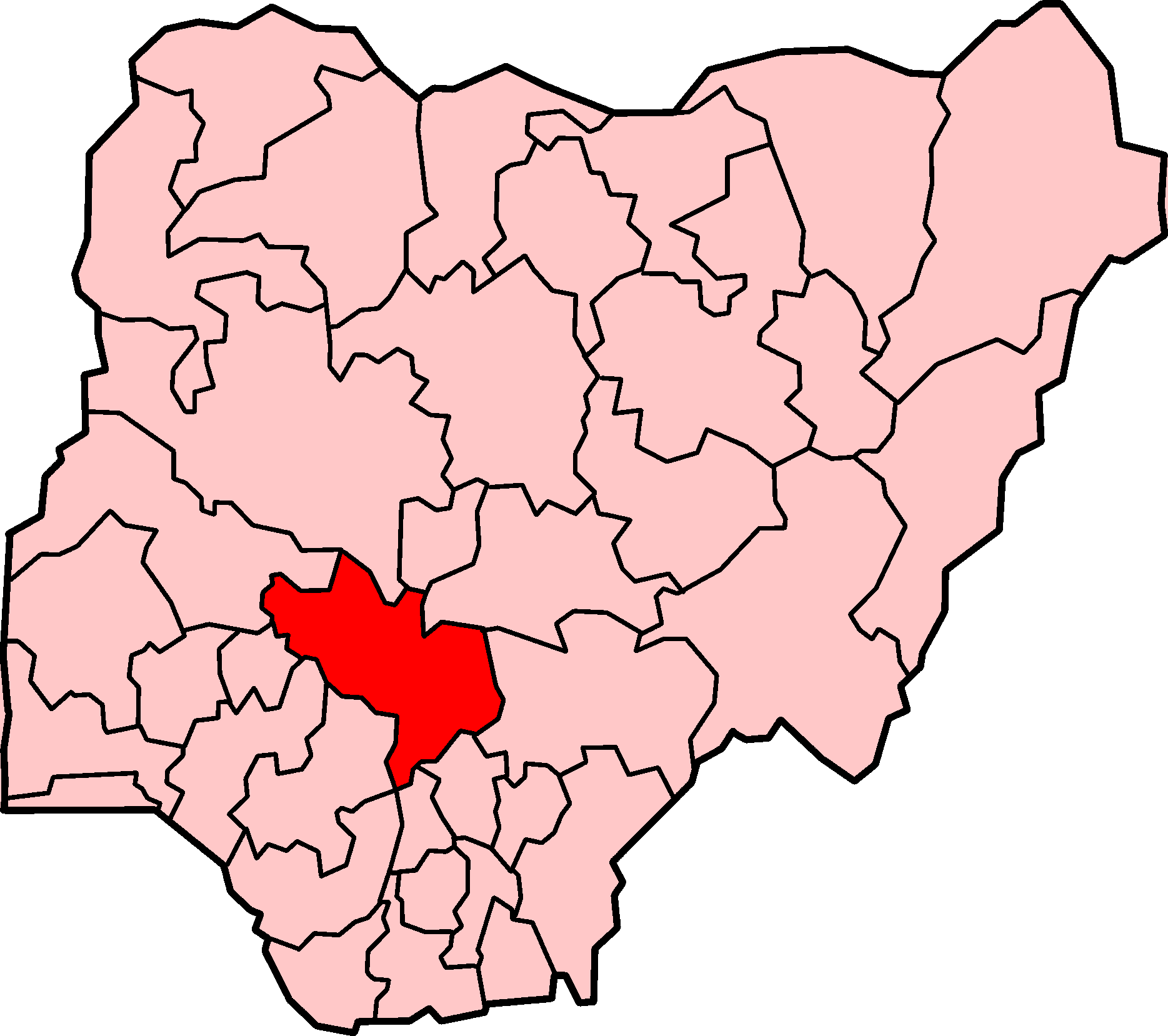
Kogi State in Nigeria

He competed with Ibrahim Idris, an Igala, for PDP nomination for the 2003 Kogi State governorship election, but was not successful. The PDP leaders decided that the candidate had to be an Igala rather than an Ebira. He was said to have been asked to nominate the deputy governorship candidate, and named Philip Ozovehe Omeiza Salawu. However, later the two men became rivals in the Kogi PDP leadership.

In May 2005, an armed group believed to be loyal to Ahmed disrupted the celebration of Democracy Day at the Kogi State stadium in Lokoja, with several people being seriously injured in the attack, which apparently was caused by ethnic rivalry. In March 2006, Ahmed was a member of a faction that opposed allowing Ibrahim Idris to run for a second term as governor on the PDP ticket.

Ahmed died in a car accident in June 2006.

== See also ==
- Nigerian National Assembly delegation from Kogi
