= Nasir Ajanah =

Chief Judge of Kogi State (1956–2020)

Justice Nasir Ajana

Chief Judge of Kogi State
- In office 2004 – 28 June 2020
- Nominated by: Kogi State Judicial Service Commission
- Appointed by: Ibrahim Idris

Personal details
- Born: 1956 Okene, Kogi State, Nigeria
- Died: 28 June 2020 (aged 64) Gwagwalada, Federal Capital Territory, Nigeria

Nasir Ajana (1956 – 28 June 2020) was a Nigerian judge who served as the Chief Judge of Kogi State.

== Education and career ==
Ajana was born in Okene Local Government Area in Kogi State to MJ Fari Ajanah. Ajana received early education at the Native Authority (Central) Primary School, Okene between 1962 and 1968. In 1969, he enrolled in Federal Government College, Keffi and graduated in 1973. In 1974, Ajana enrolled in the same college for a Higher School Certificate (HSC) finishing in 1975. Ajana earned LLB from Ahmadu Bello University, Zaria. He attended Nigerian Law School and was subsequently called to the Nigerian Bar as a Barrister and Solicitor of the Supreme Court of Nigeria. Ajana's legal career started at the Kwara State Ministry of Justice where he served as State Counsel (1982–1984). In 1984, he established his own private firm, Nasiru Ajana & Co in Okene until 1989 when he was appointed a Judge of Kwara State High Court. He was transferred to Kogi State after its creation in 1991.

Prior to his appointment as Chief Judge of Kogi State, Ajana had served in different capacities. In 1994, Ajana served on the Kabba disturbance tribunal in Kogi State as chairman. Ajana was chairman, Election petition tribunal in Adamawa State for the 1998 general elections; Member, Governing board of Nigerian Institute of Advanced Legal Studies (1999–2006); chairman, Panel on Muritala Mohammed International Airport Fire Incidence (2000); chairman, Election petition Tribunal in Akwa – Ibom State (2007) and chairman; Election Tribunal Petition (2) in Rivers State (2008).

In early 2018, the executive and legislative arm of government in Kogi State commenced a move to remove Ajana from office for an alleged gross misconduct. The State House of Assembly had passed a resolution recommending that the governor remove Ajana from office. Ajana however approached a High Court in Koton Karfe, for an interpretation of the constitution on whether the State House of Assembly and the governor could sack the Chief Judge of the state from office. The court ruled that the Legislature acting jointly with the Executive or unilaterally lacks the powers to remove the Chief Judge of the state without recourse to National Judicial Council (NJC). The Judge in his ruling further stated that "It was an audacious and arbitrary display of naked power, an act that is contrary to all constitutional and democratic tenets."

== Death ==
Ajanah died from COVID-19 at a COVID-19 isolation centre, in Gwagwalada on 28 June 2020, during the COVID-19 pandemic in Nigeria.
