= World War Cenotaph, Lokoja =

- Established: 1995
- Location: Murtala Mohammed Way, Lokoja, Nigeria
- Coordinates: 7°47′N 6°44′E
- Type: War Memorial Museum
- Founders: Colonel Paul Omeruo (Fss, Mss, Psc(+)
- Architects: Ministry of Environment and Physical Development

The World War Cenotaph in Lokoja, Nigeria is a remembrance arcade for fallen heroes. It is located along Murtala Mohammed way, besides federal medical centre in Lokoja, the colonial Nigeria administrative center and headquarters of the Royal Niger Company.

== History ==
The cenotaph was conceived in 1995, under the former ministry of health and social services, Kogi State during the regime of Colonel Paul Omeruo, the previous military administrator of the state.

This cenotaph is a war memorial, built in memory of the British and Nigerian officers, as well as other ranks. This is specific to the pack, who lost their lives in the world wars. The war memorial, a gigantic concrete block with old artillery mounted on it, is situated in the middle of light cannons and machine guns placed on small pavements. It exhibits relics of weapons employed by the British forces against the German forces in defence of their colonies in East Africa and Cameroon. This is clearly implied by the year, 1914 Cameroon and 1918 East African wars boldly written on the remnants of the cannon on display. The displayed cannons signify disparity between the technology of the old era and present day military weaponry and warfare. The cenotaph has a measurement of 16.8 × 50 meters.

Another spectacular feature of the cenotaph is an inscription of the names of eminent military personnel who served in the two world wars. This is found on tables laid on the side of the cenotaph. In other words, a memento of three heavy artillery guns is seen with names of exceptional soldiers engraved on a plaque and placed on the huge concrete block accommodating one of the artilleries.

The attributes of this monument have made it a designated place where government functionaries and Nigerian soldiers in Kogi state mark the yearly army remembrance day every 15 January, in honour of their dead heroes. Hence, it is usually relatively taken care of and always repainted.

The cenotaph witnessed the memorial of the 2020 Armed forces remembrance day celebration on Wednesday, 15 January. The governor of Kogi State, Yahaya Bello, flanked by top service personnel representative of retired service men and the Ohinoyi of Ebiraland, Dr. Ado Ibrahim CON, laid wreaths in honour and remembrance of the nation's fallen heroes. This respect was extended with a pledge by the governor's administration to provide maximum support to the families of all fallen servicemen in the state. This was preceded by the inspection of the Guard of Honour, signing the Hard Book, and releasing the white pigeons, by the governor, which symbolises existing national peace.
