= Isaac Alfa =

Nigerian politician

Air Marshal Isaac Mohammed Alfa
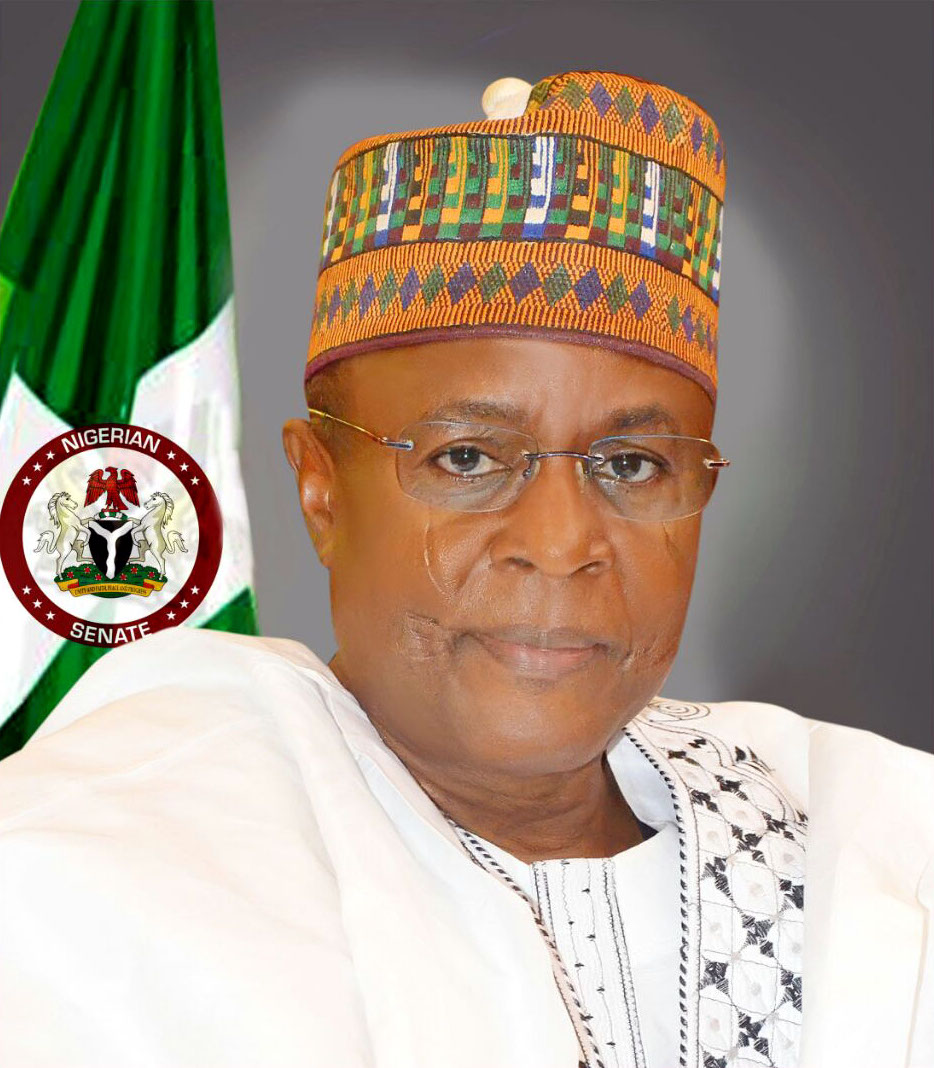
- Isaac Alfa

Senator of the Federal Republic of Nigeria representing Kogi East
- In office July 2016 – January 2017 Serving with Dino Melaye; Ahmed Ogembe
- Preceded by: Emmanuel Dangana Ocheja
- Succeeded by: Atai Usman

Chief of Air Staff
- In office 29 May 1999 – 23 April 2001
- Preceded by: Nsikak Eduok
- Succeeded by: Jonah Wuyep

Personal details
- Born: Isaac Muhammed Alfa; 15 September 1950 (age 75) Inye, Kogi Nigeria
- Party: People Democratic Party
- Profession: Politician
- Website: isaacalfa.com
- Nickname: "Air Warrior"

Military service
- Allegiance: Nigeria
- Branch/service: Nigerian Air Force
- Rank: Air Marshal
- Commands: Chief of the Air Staff

Isaac Mohammed Alfa // (born 15 September 1950 in Inye, Kogi State, Nigeria) is a retired Nigerian Air Force Air Marshal, former Chief of Air Staff, and Senator from Kogi State.

In 2003 he contested the governorship of Kogi State. In July 2016, he was elected to the Senate of Nigeria, for the Nigerian National Assembly delegation from Kogi. However, on 10 January 2017 an Appeal court sitting in Abuja, Nigeria wrongly asked Alfa to vacate his seat for Atai Aidoko Ali as a senator representing Kogi East Senatorial. However, after a successful court case Isaac Alfa returned to the senatorial role after Aidoko was denied by the supreme court.

With only four months left to the end of the tenure, Alfa's achievements should not have gone unnoticed. Alfa shed light on the capabilities of Kogi as an oil-producing state, fertile for maritime activity. Alfa's military background presented the opportunity to convene a committee introspective of security bills. However, due to the ulterior motives of the senate house, national security was less than a concern.
