= Ozovehe =

Native male name of Ebira people

Ozovehe is a given name of the Ebira people; it means "child is life". The name is usually given to first male born of a family. However, it is not exclusively for first male borns and any male born could bear the name. It is an expression of the joy of having a male child - who are often seen as those to carry on the family name.

A married woman that delayed before she conceive pregnancy could also name the child Ozovehe, especially if the child is a male child.

Ozovehe is a popular name that you will find in virtually every home in Ebiraland, which is located in the southwest of the confluence of the Niger River.

The seemingly close feminine equivalent is Ozohu or Oziohu meaning "Child is the greatest" i.e. greatest of all natural gifts.
