= Ahmed Ogembe =

Nigerian politician

Ahmed Ogembe is a Nigerian politician. He served as the Senator for Kogi Central Senatorial District in the 8th National Assembly. He was also a former chairman of Okene Local Government Area in Kogi State.
