= Yakubu Oseni =

Nigerian politician

Senator of Nigeria
- Incumbent
- Assumed office May 2019
- Preceded by: Ahmed Ogembe
- Succeeded by: Abubakar Sadiku Ohere
- Constituency: Kogi Central

Executive Chairman of the Kogi State Internal Revenue Service
- In office March 2016 – August 2018

Personal details
- Born: 1975 (age 50–51) Adavi, Kogi State, Nigeria
- Party: All Progressives Congress

Yakubu Oseni (born 1975) is a Nigerian politician and a Senator of the Federal Republic of Nigeria for Kogi Central Senatorial District of Kogi State, Nigeria. He was elected in the February 2019 Nigerian general elections under the platform of the All Progressives Congress (APC).

Oseni won the Senatorial seat with 76,120 votes, followed by Natasha Akpoti of the Social Democratic Party (Nigeria), who scored 48, 336 votes to come second, the incumbent Senator, Ahmed Ogembe of the Peoples Democratic Party (Nigeria), who came third scored 19, 359 votes in the 2019 General Elections

He was the Executive Chairman of the Kogi State Internal Revenue Service (2016–2018) appointed by Governor of Kogi State Yahaya Bello.
