= Theophilus Sunday =

Nigerian minister and singer (born 1987)

Theophilus Sunday (born 9 May 1987) is a Nigerian gospel minister, singer, and songwriter.

== Early life and education ==
Theophilus Sunday was born in Dekina, Kogi State, Nigeria, where he also grew up. He attended Ochaja Boys Secondary School in Kogi State before proceeding to Kogi State University, Anyigba, where he obtained a degree in Theatre Arts.

After completing his university education, he participated in the National Youth Service Corps (NYSC) between 2012 and 2013.

He has been a drummer, singer, worship team leader and music director; his songwriting is influenced by his Igala background. He is the Music Director and Head Pastor of 1Spirit, a Christian worship Choir based in Kogi State. He has collaborated with other notable Nigerian gospel musicians and ministers, such as Lawrence Oyor and Arome Osayi.

== Songs ==
- Take Over
- Who Is Like You Lord
- Spirit Fire Me Up
- Adua
- Holy Fire
- Heart Cry
- Yahweh
