= Tajudeen Yusuf =

Nigerian politician and lawmaker

Tajudeen 'TeeJay' Yusuf

Member of the House of Representatives of Nigeria representing Kabba/Bunu/Ijumu
- Incumbent
- Assumed office 2011
- Preceded by: Dino Melaye

Personal details
- Born: 25 August 1968 (age 58)
- Party: PDP
- Education: University of Jos
- Profession: Politician
- Website: https://www.yusufteejay.org/

Tajudeen Yusuf popularly known as "TeeJay" (born on 25 August 1968) is a Nigerian politician from the Peoples Democratic Party. He represents Kabba/Bunu/Ijumu constituency in the House of Representatives of Nigeria, a post he was elected to in 2011. He is a former chairman, House Committee on Capital Market and Institutions.

== Background ==
Hon. TeeJay attended the popular St. Augustine's College Kabba, where he obtained his West African School Certificate/GCE in 1987. In 1997, he graduated with a Bachelor of Science degree in economics from the University of Jos, Plateau State.

== Political career ==
In 2011, Honourable TeeJay ran for the Kabba-Bunu/Ijumu Federal Constituency seat in Nigeria's 7th National Assembly and won. In 2015, and 2019, he was re-elected to the same position. Between 2015 and 2019, he served as the Chairman of the House Committee on Capital Market & Institutions, while also serving as a member on the following Committees: Information Communication Technology Committee; Finance Committee; Ports, Harbours & Waterways; Information & National Orientation Committee; Sport Committee; House Committee on FERMA; the House Public Accounts Committee; and the House Committee on Human Rights. Between 2011 and 2015, Hon. TeeJay served as the Deputy Chairperson of the House Committee on Information Communication Technology.

== Honours ==
Over the years, Honourable TeeJay has received the following awards in recognition of his public service achievements:

- House of Representatives Member of the Year, 2017, presented by City People Magazine
- Effective Representation Award, 2016, presented by Nigerian Union of Journalists (Kogi State Council)
- Pillars Award for Excellence, 2016, presented by Unijos Alumni Association (Abuja Chapter)
- North Central Lawmaker of the Year, 2014, presented by City People Magazine
- Most Outstanding Lawmaker on Empowerment & Constituency Development, North Central Zone, 2013, presented by Disciples of Democracy
- Lawmaker of the Year, 2012, presented by Nigeria Media Night Out Award
- Young Male Achiever of the Year, 2011, presented by Top Celebrities Magazine
- Most Promising Young Politician of the Year, 2009, presented by Top Celebrities Magazine
- Honorary Member Award, (since 2000) presented by University of Abuja Student Union Government
- Life Senator (since 1995), National Association of Nigerian Students, NANS.
