= Mount Patti =

Mountain in Nigeria

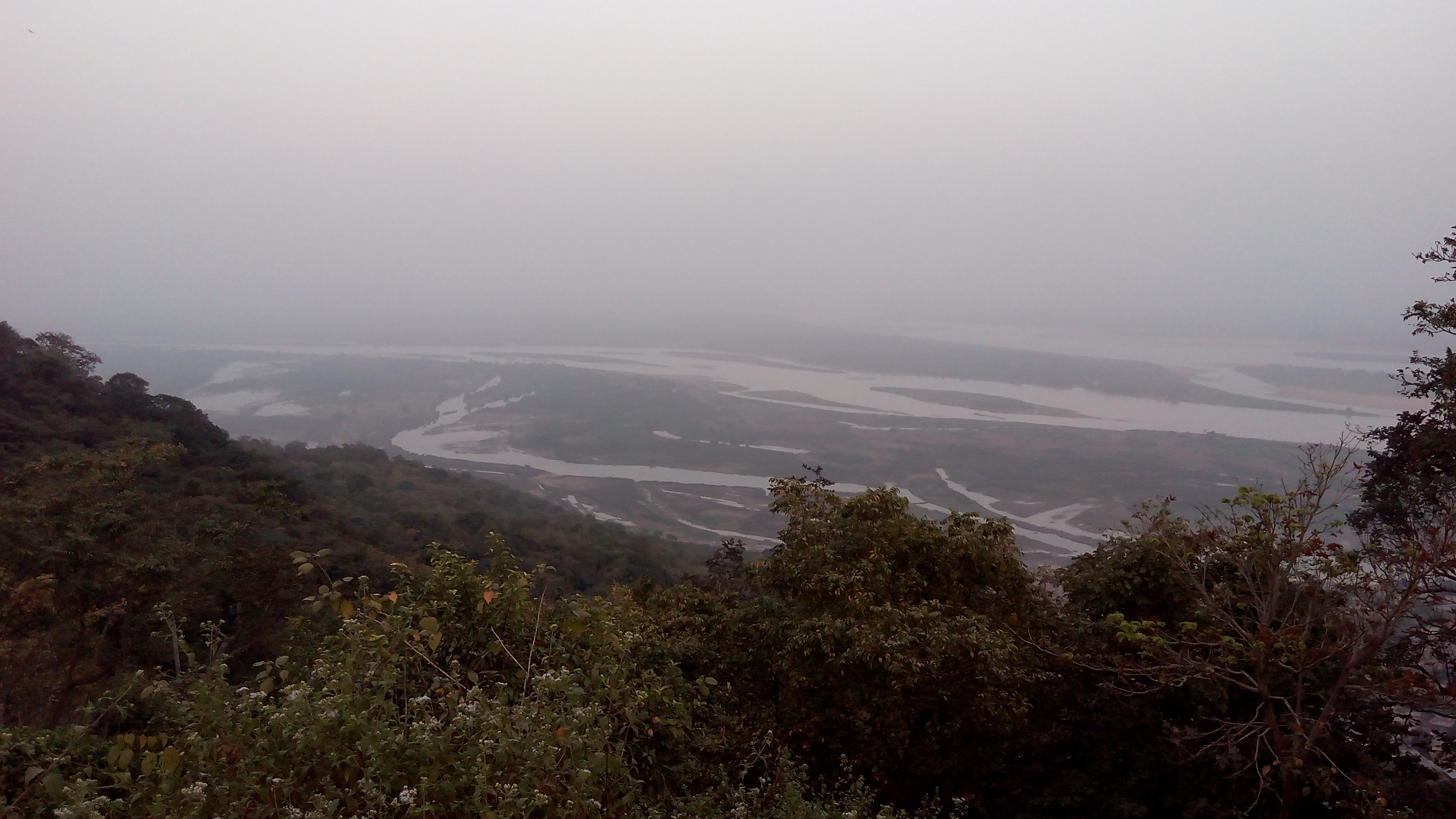
- View of Niger River from Patti hill

Highest point
- Elevation: 458 m (1,503 ft)
- Coordinates: 7°49′N 6°45′E

Geography
- Location within Nigeria
- Country: Nigeria

The Mount Patti Hill is a 458-metre (1,503 ft) mountain and tourist attraction in Lokoja, Nigeria. It is famous for being the place where British journalist and writer Flora Louise Shaw (later Flora Lugard) gave Nigeria its name.

The name (Nigeria) was coined by Flora Shaw in 1914 when looking at Lokoja from top of Mount Patti. It came into her mind because of the view of the Niger River and Benue, 6 kilometers away from the mount.

In an essay that first appeared in The Times on 8 January 1897, Shaw suggested the name Nigeria for the British Protectorate on the Niger River. In her essay, She made the case for a shorter-term that would be used for the "agglomeration of pagan and Mohammedan States" to replace the official title, "Royal Niger Company Territories". She thought that the term "Royal Niger Company Territories" was too long to be used as a name of a Real Estate Property under the Trading Company in that part of Africa. She was in search of a new name, and she coined "Nigeria."

In The Times of 8 January 1897, she wrote, "The name Nigeria applying to no other part of Africa may without offense to any neighbors be accepted as co-extensive with the territories over which the Royal Niger Company has extended British influence, and may serve to differentiate them equally from the colonies of Lagos and the Niger Protectorate on the coast and from the French territories of the Upper Niger."

In 1900, the governor-general of Northern and Southern Protectorate of Nigeria Sir Lord Frederick Lugard and other colonial leaders resided their office and resting place on the mountain, with the mount peak closed to the River Niger and Benue River.

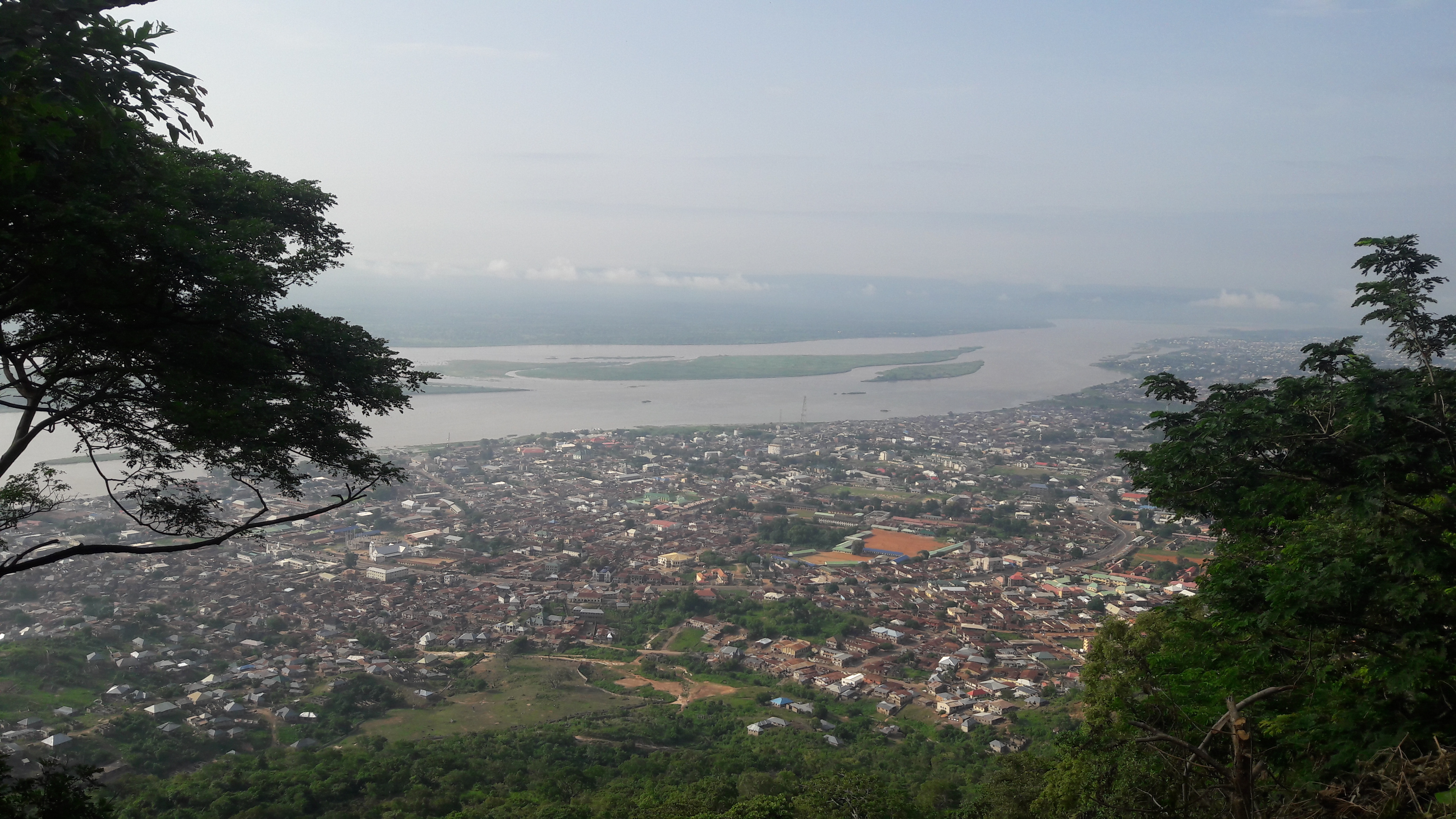
The view on top of Mountain Patti, looking at Lokoja and the two biggest rivers in Nigeria, Lord Frederick Lugard's house and office.

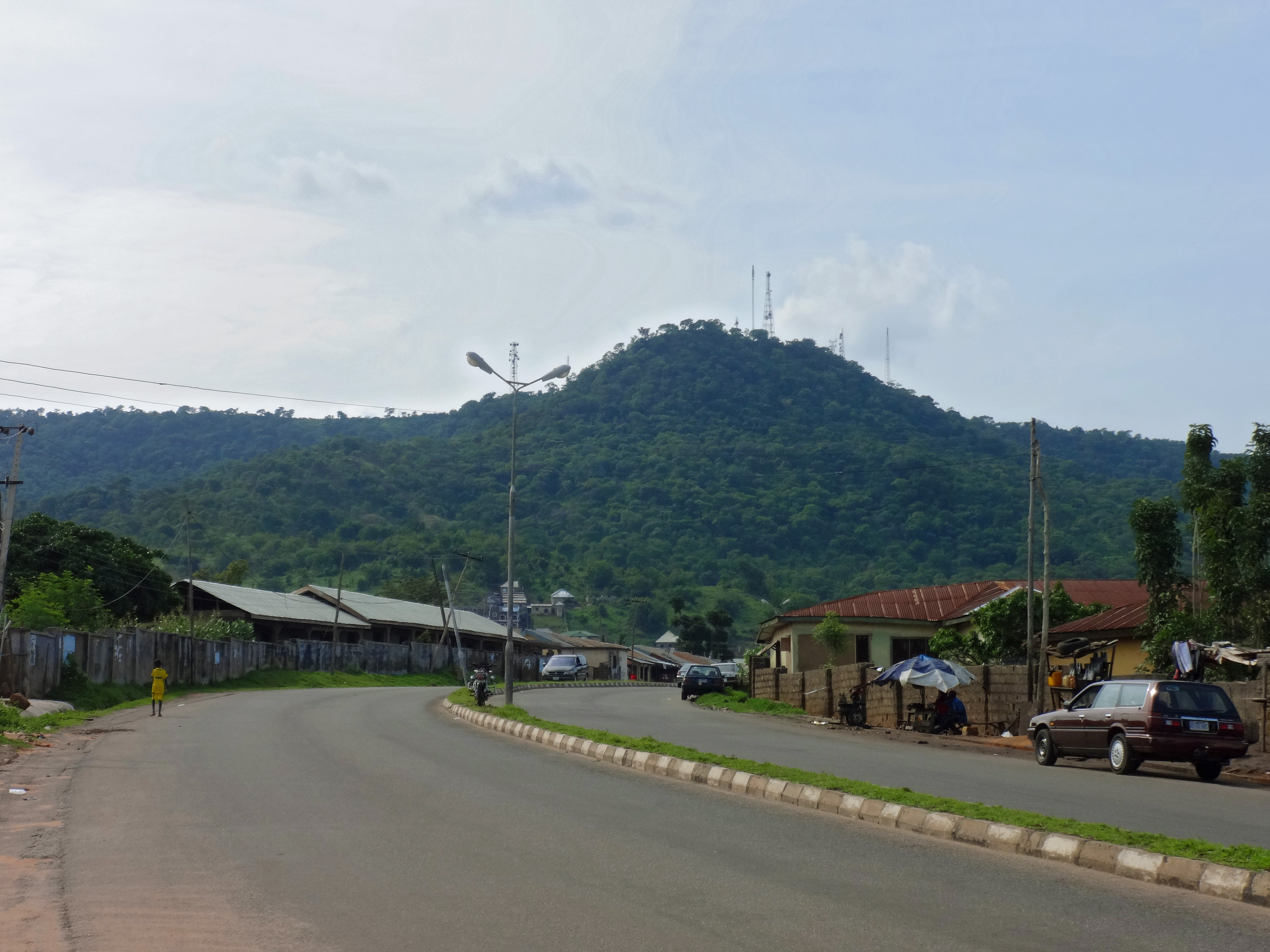
A view of Mount Patti in motorway road. Kogi Lokoja.

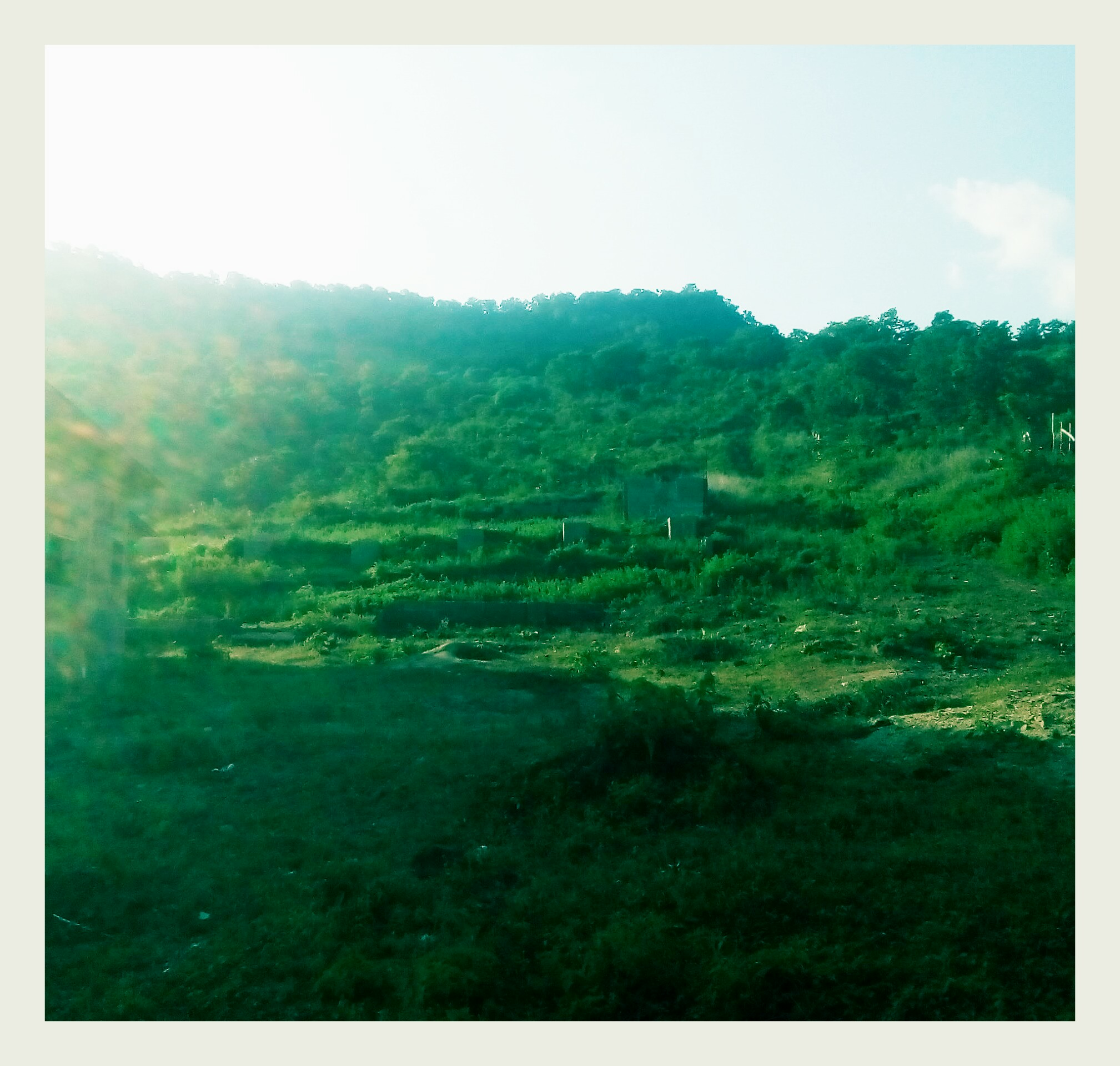
A view of Mount Patti.

The first primary school in Northern Nigeria was located there, built-in 1865.

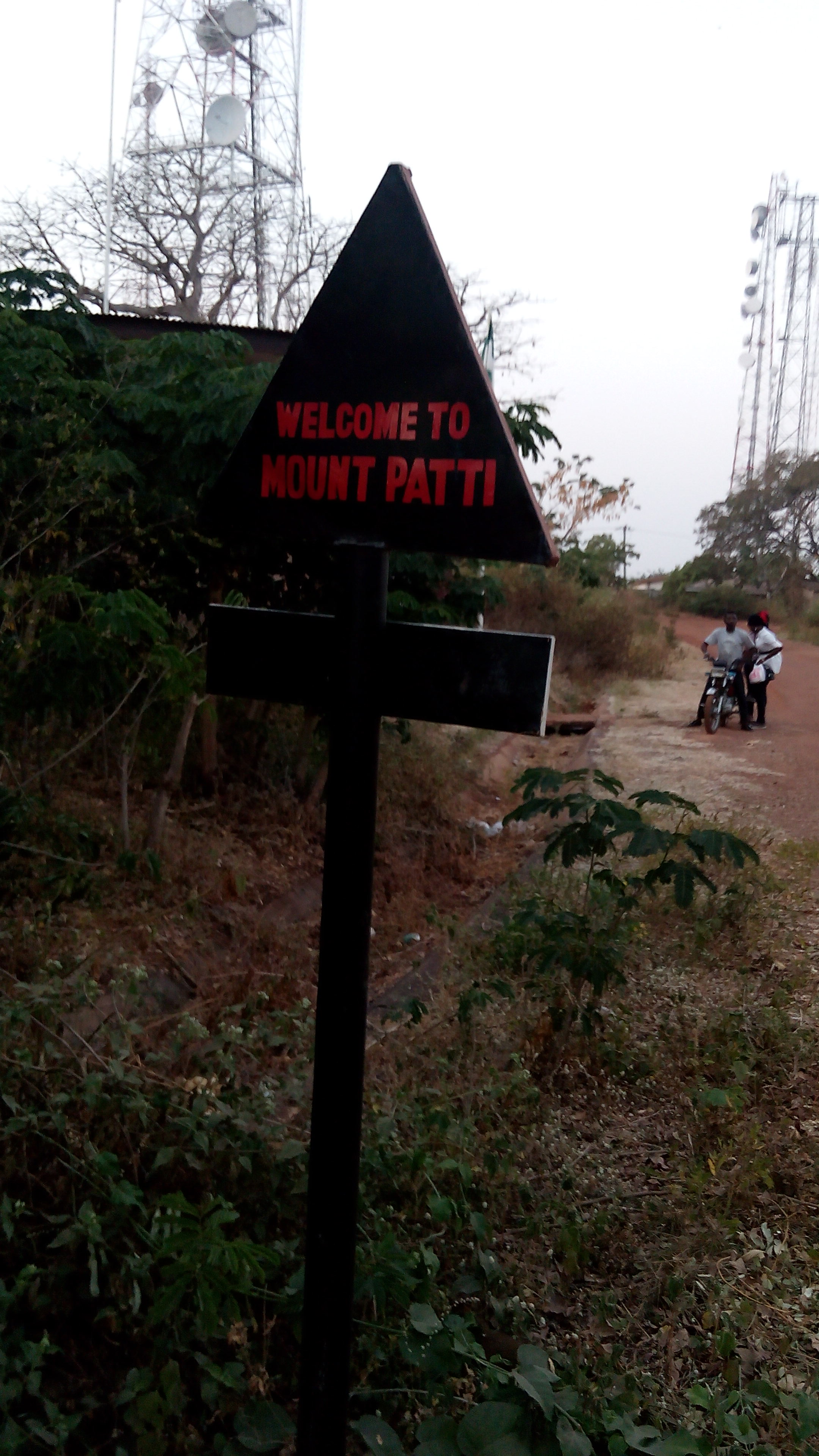
Welcome gate of Mount Patti.

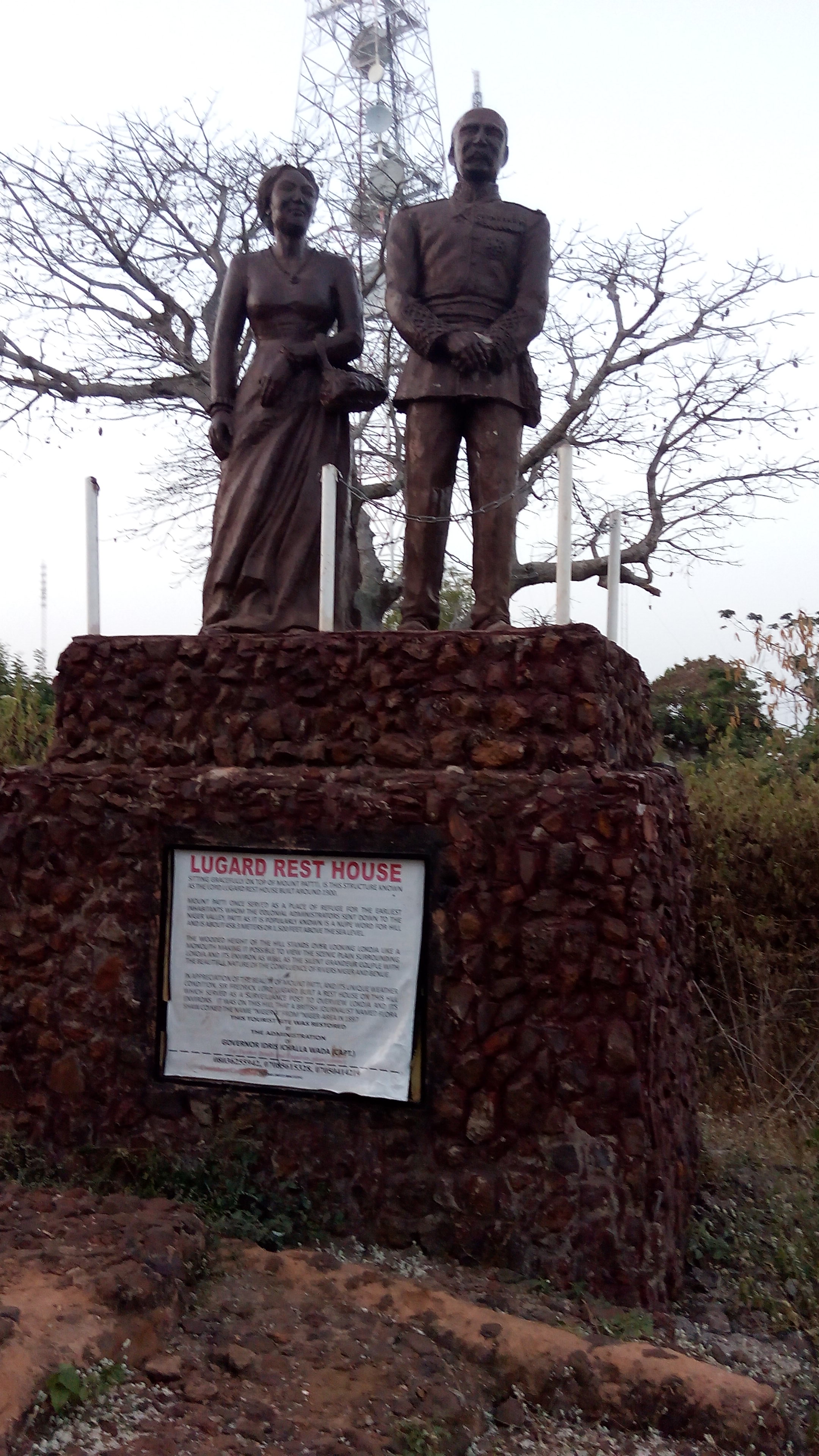
Statues of Fredrick' lurgard and Lady Lugard constructed in 1950.

The name (Patti) is a Nupe word meaning hill.
