= Ohinoyi of Ebiraland =

Traditional ruler of the Ebira people

The Ohinoyi of Ebiraland is the traditional ruler of the Ebira people. The title Ohinoyi of Ebiraland has also historically been used for this position but fell out of favour in the 20th century. The position is elected by a group of elders and has traditionally rotated amongst the major clans of the Ebira.This is majorly because there is no established succession line. The latest Ohinoyi, Ahmed Tijani Muhammad Anaje assumed office on 8 January 2024.

== List of Rulers of Ebiraland ==
- Ibrahim Onoruoiza (1884–1964), reigned from 1917 to 1954 (abdicated)
- Muhamman Sani Omolori, (1919–1997), reigned from 1957 to 1997
- Abdul Rahman Ado Ibrahim (1929–2023) reigned from 1997 to 2023
- Ahmed Tijani Anaje (b. 1974), since 8 January 2024

== See also ==
- List of Nigerian traditional states
