= Segun Adaju =

Nigerian Entrepreneur

- Education: B.Sc, Economics, University of Lagos; MBA, University of Lagos; Harvard Business School; Lagos Business School; Renewables Academy Berlin.
- Occupations: Entrepreneur, Renewable energy consultant
- Years active: 2012–present
- Known for: President, Renewable Energy Association Nigeria(REAN),

Segun Adaju (born 1969) is a Nigerian entrepreneur, CEO Consistent Energy Limited and President, Renewable Energy Association Nigeria (REAN). He was Deputy manager of Integrated Micro-finance Bank limited which was the pioneer Micro-finance bank in Nigeria and Founder and was Managing Director of GS Micro-finance Bank Limited.

== Education ==
Adaju earned a degree in Economics and MBA from the University of Lagos. He furthered his education by obtaining executive programmes in Harvard Business School, MIT/Sloan School of Management, Frankfurt School of Management, Renewable Academy Berlin and Lagos Business School.

== Career ==
Before Consistent Energy, Adaju had worked with leading commercial banks in Nigeria like Equity Bank of Nigeria Limited, First Atlantic Bank Plc and First City Monument Bank Plc before quitting in 2006 to co-found Integrated Micro-finance Bank which is the pioneer micro-finance bank in Nigeria and later set out to establish his own Micro-finance Bank, GS Micro-finance Bank Ltd in 2007. In January 2015, he founded Consistent Energy Limited and presently served as the chief Energizing Officer.

He is a Mentor under the Tony Elumelu Entrepreneurship Programme (TEEP) and Coach under West African Forum for Clean Energy Financing (WAFCEF).
