= Jibrin Isah =

Nigerian politician (born 1960)

Senator
- Incumbent
- Assumed office June 2019

Personal details
- Born: February 28, 1960 (age 66) Kogi State, Nigeria
- Party: All Progressives Congress (APC)
- Education: Bayero University Kano; University of Ibadan; University of Nigeria; University of Lagos
- Profession: Politician; banker

Jibrin Isah // (born 28 February 1960) is a Nigerian politician and banker, who is the senator representing Kogi East Senatorial District of Kogi State at the 9th National Assembly.

== Education ==
Isah attended the LGEA Primary School, Ajiolo-Ojaji from 1967 to 1972. He proceeded to the Our Lady of School, Anyigba, for his secondary education between 1973 and 1977. He got his B.sc degree in economics at the Bayero University Kano in 1983. He got his master's in economics from the University of Lagos in 1991. He got another master's in Petroleum and Energy at the University of Ibadan in 2002. He obtained his MBA at the University of Nigeria in 2003.

== Professional career ==
In 1988, he joined Chase Merchant Bank Plc as an analyst. He moved to Afribank International Limited (Merchant Bankers) in 1991 as the head of Project Finance/Leasing Department. He was made the head of Capital Market group in 1993. In 1998, he was the Managing Director/Chief Executive of AIL Securities Limited.

== Political career ==
In 2011, he contested for the governorship ticket of the People's Democratic Party and lost to Idris Wada. In 2015, he contested to the aspirant in the People's Democratic Party primaries and lost to the Incumbent Idris Wada.

In the 2019 general election, he was elected as the senator representing Kogi East after a supplementary election. He polled 134,189 votes while Ali Atai Aidoko, the candidate of the PDP, polled 74,201 votes.
