= Ebira people =

Ethnic group in central Nigeria

Ebira /eh 'be ra/
Total population
- 2,000,000

Regions with significant populations

Languages
- Ebira language

Religion
- Predominantly Islam

Related ethnic groups
- Igala, Yoruba, Nupe, Afemai

The Ebira people are an ethno-linguistic group of North central Nigeria. Most Ebira people are from Kogi State and Nasarawa State. Their language is usually classified as Nupoid and within the Benue-Congo branch of the Niger-Congo language family. Until the separation of Kogi State from Kwara State, Okene, located not far from the Niger-Benue confluence, was seen as the administrative center of the Ebira-speaking people in Kogi state. Since the formation of the state, the Ebira Ta'o people are predominantly found in five local governments in Kogi state, namely Adavi, Ajaokuta, Okehi, Okene and Ogori/Magongo. They are also found in large numbers in the Federal Capital Territory, Abuja and Nasarawa in Toto LGA. Also, the Eganyi are found in Ajaokuta LGA. And the Etuno can be found in Igarra town of Ogorimagongo, Okehi and Okene each with their administrative headquarters. Ebira Koto is found in Kogi and Koton Karfe LGA, Bassa LGA, Lokoja in Kogi, Abaji LGA in the Federal Capital Territory and Akoko-Edo LGA, Edo State.

After decades of campaign, intellectual brainstorming and organized symposia/conferences, the people of Ebira from various enclaves finally secured an official spelling of the name "Ebira" for the ethnic group, as published in the Federal Republic of Nigeria Official Gazette on July 14, 2022. They had been previously called Igbira, Ebirra, Egbirra, Ibira, Ibirra and Egbira. Ibrahim Ohida, national secretary of Ohiku-Ebira Descendants Union (OEDU), announced the development in a statement:

“The Ohiku-Ebira Descendants Union (OEDU), wishes to formally inform members of the Ebira Nation that the Union has secured an official gazette of the agreed common name EBIRA spelt E-B-I-R-A for people of the Ebira Nation comprising Ebira Opete, Ebira Miyakan and Ebira Etuno (Igarra) … This is in recognition of our common ancestry and expressed desire to be so recognised for reasons of unity, numerical strength and enhanced political relevance among the comity of ethnic nationalities in Nigeria.”

The group said the adoption of the common name was made based on the agreements reached during consultations with traditional fathers and stakeholders at Okene and Koton Karfe conventions in 2010 and 2021, respectively.

== Geography ==
In recent history, Ebira people inhabit a territory south-west of the confluence of the Niger and Benue Rivers though some Ebira communities also reside on the north-east of the confluence, the territory surrounding the confluence is an ethnically diverse area with diffused cultural symbols. Ebiraland is north of Etsako, east of Yorubaland and west of Igalaland. It is dominated by deciduous woodland and rocky hills of an open Savannah vegetation.

The major local government areas are Adavi, Ajaokuta, Koton-Karfi, Okehi and Okene. Since the advent of colonialism, many Ebiras have moved southwards in search of arable farming spaces and due to working as migrant farmers.

== History ==
=== Early population movements ===
The migration of Ebira people to what is now known as Ebiraland is mostly surmised by oral history. However, most versions trace the migration from the Jukuns of the Kwararafa state, north of the Benue River and in present-day Taraba State. One of the relics of their trace from Kwararafa is the Opete stool, their symbol of authority and identity as a group within the kingdom, brought along and kept in a place in Opete (deriving its name from the stool), in present-day Ajaokuta. The Opete is presently the title instrument of Ozumi of Okene. After migration from Kwararafa, they originally settled with the Igalas and both groups lived together for about 300 years. A dispute between the two groups led to a parting of ways, and the Ebiras moved southwest of the River Niger to their ancestral home called Ebira Opete an area around Ajaokuta. Other groups later moved south to found Okengwe, Ubororo, and Okehi. Historically, these Ebiras communities were autonomous units without a central king or recognized royal families but were managed by leaders of lineages in a type of gerontocracy.

The Ebiras left Idah after the Idah-Benin War around 1519–1521. They then stopped at Itobe. The remaining Ebira Group that left Idah is ITAAZI (Ebira tao) IGU (Ebira koto), PANDA (Ebira Toto, Nasarawa,) AGATU (Ebira Benue the Father of Ebira MOZUM that chose to settle among Basa, and finally UNO (Ebira Ètè-Uno, Edo) who chose to settle across the River Benue with ITAAZI. UNO settled in the present day Edo State. All members of the various clans in Ebira Tao are descendants of the children of ITAAZI. ITAAZI had five sons named Adaviruku/Ohizi, Ododo, Obaji, Uga, Ochuga/Onotu. Ohizi (Adaviruku) had five children who are progenitors of the five traditional Adavi clans named after them. They occupied the present-day Ajaokuta, Adavi, Okene, Okengwe, Okehi, Eika, Ihiara, and Osisi among Others.

=== Pre-colonial and colonial period ===
During the conquest of Hausaland by the armies of the religious and political leader Uthman Dan Fodio, the Ebiras came under a state of conflict with Fulani warlords to the north and west. In the middle of the nineteenth century, two major communities, Igu (Koton Karfe) as it was called by Hausa, it means strong land because they fought to conquer them but never succeeded and were not conquered. Between 1865 and 1880, they battled, under the leadership of a warlord, Achigidi Okino, with jihadists called Ajinomoh who were from Bida and Ilorin. However, the Ebiras were not conquered by the Fulanis, helped in part by the natural defenses of their hilly environment.

British interest in Ebiraland started with the location of a Royal Niger Company post in Lokoja. In 1898, the British annexed Ilorin and Nupeland under the pretext of controlling the free flow of trade, they set up a military post in Kabba, west of Ebiraland, and the Ebiras soon were a target for annexation. In 1903, after much resistance, Ebira territory fell under British control. To manage the various autonomous villages, a central figure was appointed by the British to represent Ebiras. The first of such figures was Ouda Adidi of Eika, who ruled until 1903, he was succeeded by Omadivi, a favorite of the British. Omadivi was a clan head who had earlier fought against the jihadists but supported trade with the British. During his reign, his authority over the other clans was minimal. When Omadivi died, Adano was appointed but had a short reign. In 1917, a new ruler, Ibrahim, was chosen. Ibrahim was also called Attah Ibrahim or Attah of Ebiraland, he was a maternal grandson of Omadivi. It was during his reign that the British colonists introduced indirect rule, a significant political development that increased the authority of Attah. Ibrahim used his position as head of the Ebira Native Authority to bring together the autonomous communities under his political leadership, a process that was opposed by some members of those communities. He gained the confidence of the British who entrusted territories northwards of Ebiraland, such as Lokoja, to him. Ibrahim was a Muslim convert and helped spread Islam in the region. However, Ibrahim was exiled in 1954, a consequence of political intrigues.

The first primary school in the community was located in his palace and many of his children were educated and some ended up holding prominent positions in the regional and federal governments. Ibrahim was succeeded by Sani Omolori who held the title of Ohinoyi of Ebiraland.

=== Religion ===
Before the introduction of Christianity and Islam, Ebira people practiced a form of African traditional religion with a central focus on a god called Ohomorihi, the rainmaker who lives in the sky. Rites are performed to appease the god whose attributes include punishing evildoers and rewarding good people. Other religious figures below the Ohomorihi are ori (deities) and spirits. In Ebira tradition, there is a belief in a spirit world where dead ancestors live.

== Culture ==
=== Family life, food and social system ===
In the early history of the Ebira people, the family was headed by the father or the oldest male who acted as the provider, religious leader, and protector of the family (Ireh). Other important social systems are compounds (Ohuoje) which are composed of related or kindred patrilineal families, Ovovu, the outer compounds, and then lineages (Abara), composed of several related compounds. The Clan (Iresu) is a community of kindred lineages in Ebiraland and is led by the Otaru. Clan identities are distinguished by symbols: mostly animals such as leopards, crocodiles, pythons, or buffalo. The affairs of the community were managed by a group of elder male members each representing related lineages.

The principal occupation of Ebiras is farming. They cultivate maize, yams, cassava, and vegetables. In the nineteenth century some communities cultivated and traded benne seeds as "gorigo".

Ebiras are also known for the weaving of clothing, crafts, hair making and they are generally very industrious.

The Ebira people also have peculiar ways that they prepare their meals which are only distinct to them and form their identity. The Ebira people bring to the world Ọve, which is made from water yam and usually made with a particular kind of leave. This is typically what we know as moi moi but with the difference that Ebiras make this moi moi out of water yam (Evina) rather than the typical beans that many Nigerians are used to.

Contemporary Ebira social life has seen changes over the years, though farming is still a dominant occupation. Many Ebiras are influenced by Western and contemporary Nigerian culture and live in urban settlements. Behaviors such as polygamy and a close relationship with a related lineage are fading and the Attah or Ohinoyi is no longer the dominant political authority within the land. Another new tradition embraced by the Ohinoyi was handing out chieftaincy titles to individuals named to be “Taru” or “Ohi” as is common in many other Nigerian cultures.

Ebira territory such as Ajaokuta is cosmopolitan as a result of the construction of a steel mill in the town.

=== Ekuechi festival ===
Ekuechi festival is the most widely celebrated traditional festival in Ebira communities, it is held annually starting in late November and ending in late December or January. The duration of the festival is long because different clans choose their dates to mark the festival. "Eku" in Ebira represents an ancestral masquerade while "Chi" means to descend. In traditional Ebira culture there exists a belief in the existence of a land of the living and another for the dead, and veneration of the land of the dead by those from the land of the living. Ekuechi thus can be interpreted as ancestral spirits returning to earth. The masquerades performing in the festival are believed to have access to the spirit world where dead relatives abide noting the behaviors of the living. During the festival, these masquerades deliver messages of good tidings and admonishment from the spirit world. The festival also marks the end of the year and the beginning of a new one. A major performance during the festival is a masked performance by Eku'rahu that is centered on singing, drumming, and chanting.

== Notable people of Ebira Origin ==
- Ohinoyi of Ebiraland Ado Ibrahim
- Mercy Johnson A Nollywood Actress
- Joseph Makoju formerly managing director [Lafarge WAPCo; NEPA and Dangote Cement]
- Natasha Akpoti Senator
- Raji Abdullah Pre Independence hero
- Yahaya Bello Former Governor of kogi state
- Abubakar Sadiku Ohere

== Sources ==
- Picton, J (2009). "Cloth and the Corpse in Ebira". Textile: The Journal of Cloth & Culture. 7 (3): 296–313. doi:10.2752/147597509X12541451109839. S2CID 52233865.
- Adinoyi-Ojo, O (1996). Playing at the crossroads: Social space as metaphor in ebira masked performances (Thesis). New York University.
- Ododo, Sunday (2001). "Theatrical Aesthetics and Functional Values of Ekuechi Masquerade Ensemble of the Ebira People in Nigeria". African Study Monographs. 22 (1): 1–36.
