= Joseph Makoju =

Nigerian politician (1948–2022)

Joseph O. Makoju, MNI, OON, OFR

Special Adviser on Electric Power to Mr. President
- In office 1 July 2008 – 20 May 2008

Honorary Adviser to Mr. President on Electric Power
- Incumbent
- Assumed office 20 May 2008

Special Adviser to Group President/CE Dangote Group
- Incumbent
- Assumed office October 2009

Personal details
- Born: 13 July 1948
- Died: 11 April 2022 (aged 73)

Joseph Oyeyani Makoju (13 July 1948 – 11 April 2022) served as Special Adviser (Electric Power) to the President Goodluck Jonathan of Nigeria under two separate administrations. He was Honorary Adviser on Electric Power to the President/Commander-in-Chief, Federal Republic of Nigeria (effect from 20 May 2008). He was also the Special Adviser to the President/Chief Executive, Dangote Group, the chairman, Cement Manufacturers Association of Nigeria, as well as West African Power Pool Executive Board. Makoju recently retired as the Group Managing Director/ CEO of the Dangote Cement PLC; a position he had held since April 2018.

Prior to that, he was the managing director/chief executive officer of the erstwhile National Electric Power Authority (NEPA)/Power Holding Company of Nigeria (PHCN); Nigeria's national electricity utility. He was selected and invited for this job by government on the basis of his track record in the private sector. And, for almost a decade, the managing director/chief executive officer of the West African Portland Cement Company, at that time Nigeria's largest cement manufacturing company. After his tenure as the managing director/Chief Executive of NEPA, Makoju was appointed consecutively as Special Adviser to three presidents of Nigeria.

== Early life and education ==
Makoju was born on 13 July 1948 in Okene, Kogi State Nigeria. Makoju was a Harford award winner of Government College, Kaduna and also a J. F. Kennedy Essays Award winner of Federal Government College Warri Nigeria.

He graduated from University of Nottingham, UK, in 1972 with First Class Honours earning BSc in mechanical engineering; and M.Phil. mechanical engineering in 1974 from the same university. Attended National Institute for Policy and Strategic Studies NIPSS, Kuru, Jos (mni) 1989 to 1990. He also held an honorary Doctor of Science degree in engineering from the Federal University of Agriculture, Makurdi.

== Professional bodies ==
Makoju was a Chartered Engineer and a Fellow of the Nigerian Society of Engineers (FNSE), Nigerian Institute of Management (FNIM) and the Nigerian Academy of Engineering. He was a member of the British Institute of Mechanical Engineers, Nigerian Institute of Management and of the National Institute for Policy and Strategic Studies (mni). He was the chairman of Cement Manufacturers Association of Nigeria (CMAN) 1992 – 2000. He was the vice-president of Nigeria's Employers Consultative Association (NECA) (1998–2000). Between May 1994 and May 1999, he was the President of the Chemical and Non-Metallic Employers Federation (CANMPEF), the largest employers Federation in the manufacturing sector.

Makoju was a National Council member of the Manufacturer Association of Nigeria. He was also a member of the National Economic Revival Council, a think-tank for advising government on economic policy and member of the African Regional Board of the London School of Economics.

== National awards ==
In parallel to his effort and contribution to the advancement of the country, Makoju was in October 2000 honoured with the officer of the Order of the Niger (OON) award, and in 2011 with officer of the Federal Republic – both Nigerian national awards. He was also honoured with the National Grand Commander of the Special Order of Merit from the Republic of Niger. He also held an honorary Doctorate of Science degree from the Federal University of Agriculture, Makurdi.
