= Kogi West senatorial district =

Senate district in Nigeria

Kogi West senatorial district covers seven local governments which include; Kaba Bunu, Kogi/Koto Karfe, Mopa Muro, Ijumu, Yagba East, Yagba West and Lokoja. The current representative is Senator Smart Adeyemi. This district is unpredictable in its voting pattern.

== List of members representing the district ==
Member	Party	Year	Assembly
Jonathan Tunde Ogbeha	PDP	1999-2007	4th, 5th
Smart Adeyemi	PDP	2007-2015	6th, 7th
Dino Melaye	APC (2015) PDP (2019)	2015-2019	8th, 9th (Note: Dino Melaye won the initial election, but it was overturned by the Election Petition Tribunal as the margin of victory was less than the number of ballots not accepted. In the re-run of the election, Smart Adeyemi won and replaced Melaye.)
Smart Adeyemi	APC	2019–2023	9th
Sunday Karimi Steve	APC	2023-present	10th
