= Okene =

Town in Kogi state, Nigeria

- City and LGA
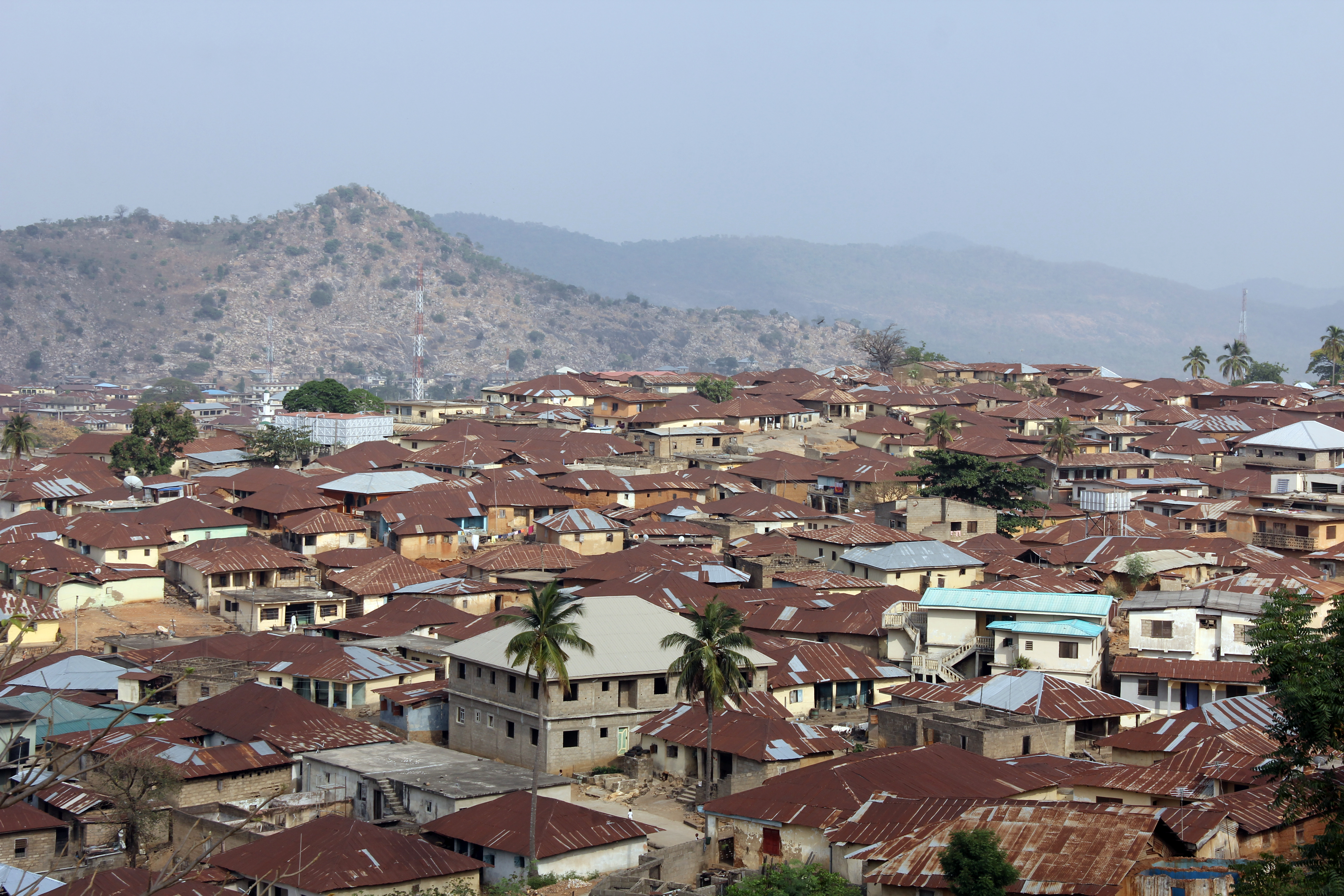
- A landscape view of Okene town, Kogi State Nigeria
- Interactive map of Okene
- Location within Nigeria
- Coordinates: 7°33′43″N 6°14′28″E
- Country: Nigeria
- State: Kogi
- LGA: Okene

Government
  - Local Government Chairman: Eneni Ahmed Nuhu

Area
  - Total: 328 km^{2} (127 sq mi)

Population (2006 Census)
  - Total: 320,260
  - Density: 976/km^{2} (2,530/sq mi)
- Time zone: UTC+1 (WAT)
- 3-digit postal code prefix: 264
- ISO 3166 code: NG.KO.ON
- Climate: Aw

Okene is a town in the Nigerian state of Kogi. The town is based in a Local Government Area of the same name. Okene runs along the A2 highway. It had an area of 328 km^{2} and a population of 320,260 at the 2006 census.

The predominant people in Okene are the Ebira of central Nigeria and the Ebira language is spoken.

The postal code of the area is 264.

== People ==
Okene is the birthplace of American Hockey League player and National Hockey League prospect Akim Aliu. Another prominent Nigerian hailing from Okene is Engineer Joseph Makoju, the former managing director of the Power Holding Company of Nigeria and currently the Honorary Adviser to Mr President on Electric Power and the Honorary Adviser to the President/CEO Dangote Group on Strategies. Okene is the birthplace of Governor Yahaya Bello and Governor-elect of Kogi State Ahmed Usman Ododo. Popular actress and entrepreneur Mercy Johnson also comes from Okene.

== Education ==
The Federal College of Education is situated in Okene along Okene-Lokoja road. There is also a satellite campus of the Kogi State Polythecnic. There are several schools in the town, including high schools such as Abdulaziz Atta Memorial College Okene (AAMCO), Local Government Secondary School Ohiana (LGSS), College of Arabic and Islamic Studies Okene (CAISO), Solardad Group of Schools, located close to G.R.A Okene, Samaritan Nursery And Primary School, located at Ozuwaya beside Kekere Guest Palace Okene, and many other notable schools.

== History ==
Okene Local Government Area was created in 1976 from the then Ebira Division by the Administration of General Olusegun Obasanjo, following the 1976 Local Government Reform. Ajaokuta and Ogori-Magongo LGAs were created from the old Okene LGA in 1991 and 1996 respectively. The people of Okene Local Government Area are a part of Ebira Tao people of the Central Senatorial District of Kogi State.

They are believed to have migrated from Jukun in the present day Taraba State and had a brief stopover in Idah before moving to their current location. The present Okene LGA is composed of Okene and Okengwe districts. There are 11 wards in the Local Government, namely Bariki, Otutu, Orietesu, Lafia/Obessa, Okene-Eba, Idoji, Onyukoko, Obehira-Eba, Obehira-Uvete, Abuga/Ozuja and Upogoro/Odenku wards. The population is predominantly Muslims, but a sizeable Christian minority also exists. To a great extent, there is a fusion of tradition and religions with only a negligible few still practicing exclusively traditional religion.

One of the most popular attractions in the town is the Azad Palace, which is the personal property of the Ohinoyi (King) of Ebiraland, Dr. Ado Ibrahim Atta, who is now late.

== Climate ==
The wet season is warm, oppressive, and overcast and the dry season is hot, muggy, and partly cloudy. The temperature varies from 18 °C (64 °F) to 33 °C (91 °F) and it is rarely below 14 °C (57 °F) or above 36 °C (97 °F) throughout the year. The hot season starts from January 24 to April 14, with an average daily high temperature above 32 °C (89 °F). March is the hottest month of the year in Okene with an average high of 33 °C (91 °F) and low of 22 °C (72 °F).
