= Kogi State =

State of Nigeria

Kogi
- State
- Flag Seal
- Nicknames: The Confluence State
- Location of Kogi State in Nigeria
- Coordinates: 7°30′N 6°42′E
- Country: Nigeria
- LGAs: 21
- Date created: 27 August 1991
- Capital: Lokoja

Government
  - Body: Government of Kogi State
  - Governor: Ahmed Usman Ododo (APC)
  - Deputy Governor: Salifu Joel (APC)
  - Legislature: Kogi State House of Assembly
  - Senators: C: Natasha Akpoti (PDP); E: Jibrin Isah (APC); W: Sunday Karimi (APC)
  - Representatives: List

Area
  - Total: 29,833 km^{2} (11,519 sq mi)
  - Rank: 13th of 36

Population (2006 census)
  - Total: 3,314,043
  - Estimate (2022): 4,466,800
  - Rank: 24th of 36
  - Density: 111.09/km^{2} (287.71/sq mi)
- Demonym: Kogite

GDP (PPP)
  - Year: 2021
  - Total: $23.88 billion 16th of 36
  - Per capita: $4,593; 13th of 36
- Time zone: UTC+01 (WAT)
- postal code: 260001
- ISO 3166 code: NG-KO
- HDI (2022): 0.625 medium · 9th of 37
- Website: www.kogistate.gov.ng

Kogi State is a state in the North Central region of Nigeria, bordered to the west by the states of Ekiti and Kwara, to the north by the Federal Capital Territory, to the northeast by Nasarawa State, to the northwest by Niger State, to the southwest by the states of Edo and Ondo, to the southeast by the states of Anambra and Enugu, and to the east by Benue State. It is the only state in Nigeria to border ten other states. Named for the Hausa word for river, the state was formed from parts of Benue State, Niger State, and Kwara State on 27 August 1991. The state is nicknamed the "Confluence State" as the confluence of the River Niger and the River Benue occurs next to its capital, Lokoja.

Of the 36 states of Nigeria, Kogi is the thirteenth largest in area and twentieth most populous with an estimated population of about 4.5 million as of 2016. Geographically, the state is within the tropical Guinean forest–savanna mosaic ecoregion. Important geographic features include the key rivers with the Niger flowing from the northwest and the Benue coming from the northeast before the two rivers meet in Kogi's center and bisect the state southward.

Kogi State has been inhabited for years by various ethnic groups, including the Ebira, Gbagyi, Nupe (mainly the Bassa Nge, Kakanda, and Kupa subgroups), and Oko in the state's centre; the Igala and Bassa in the east; and the Yoruba (mainly the Okun, Ogori, Oworo, and Magongo subgroups) in the west. Kogi is also religiously diverse, with about equal percentages of Christians and Muslims along with a substantial minority of adherents of traditional ethnic religions.

In the pre-colonial period, the area that is now Kogi State was split up between various states with some states being tiny and village-based as others were part of larger empires like the Nupe Kingdom which held much of now-western Kogi State until the early 1800s when the Fulani jihad annexed the kingdom and placed the area under the Sokoto Caliphate while the eastern half of the modern state was the ancient Igala Kingdom. In the 1900s and 1910s, British expeditions occupied the area and incorporated them into the Northern Nigeria Protectorate with its capital as Lokoja until 1903. The protectorate later merged into British Nigeria before becoming independent as Nigeria in 1960. Originally, modern-day Kogi State was a part of the post-independence Northern Region until 1967 when the region was split and the area became part of the North-Western State, Kwara State, and Benue-Plateau State. After Benue-Plateau and the North-Western states were split in 1976, now-Kogi became a part of the new Benue and Niger states along with Kwara. Western Benue State, southeastern Kwara State, and far southern Niger State were broken off to form the new Kogi State.

Economically, Kogi State is largely based around agriculture, mainly of coffee, cashew, groundnut, cocoa, oil palm, and yam crops. Other key industries are transport service and Logistics crude oil extraction and the livestock herding of cattle, goats, and sheep. Kogi has the ninth highest Human Development Index and sixteenth highest GDP in the country.

== Geography ==
=== Climate ===
The climate of the state has an annual rainfall total of between 1,100 mm (43 in) and 1,300 mm (51 in). The rainy season lasts from April to October each year while the dry season last sfrom November to March. The dry season is very dusty and cold as a result of the north-easterly winds, which bring in the harmattan. Between 2001 and 2014, the built-up area increased by 10.68% and seven (7) adaptation strategies were employed by farmers in changing planting dates and change crop variety at 31%, 22%, and 21% respectively, in response to change in rainfall.

=== Flooding ===
In October 2022, Kogi State witnessed one of the worst flood disaster in the history of the state. This is according to the state governor, Yahaya Bello, who said that "flooding has affected the nine LGAs which borders the Niger and Benue rivers to include, Lokoja, Kogi-Koto, Ajaokuta, Ofu, Igalamela-Odolu, Bassa, Idah, Ibaji and Omala".

=== 2012 flooding ===
In 2012, floods ravaged the state of Kogi and others in Nigeria. A total of 623,690 displaced people were accommodated in 87 camps across the state during the period. Roads were unmotorable due to the flood. Many school buildings became refugee camps. Houses were submerged. Property and infrastructure was badly affected. Crops in farm fields were seriously damaged. The flood caused deaths, loss of property and destruction of farmland and produce estimated at N63.4 billion in nine local government areas of Kogi state.

=== Adjacent states ===
- Federal Capital Territory (Nigeria) – to the north for 17 km
- Nasarawa State – to the northeast for 151 km
- Benue State – to the east for 153 km
- Enugu State – to the southeast for 112 km
- Anambra State – to the south for 40 km
- Edo State – to the south for 133 km and the southwest for 81 km across the Niger River
- Ondo State – to the west for 45 km
- Ekiti State – to the west for 92 km
- Kwara State – to the west for 188 km
- Niger State – to the north for 135 km (mostly across the Niger River)

Kogi State is the only state in Nigeria that shares a boundary with ten other states.

== History and people ==
The state has a diverse economy that includes business and agriculture, a culturally diverse population, and a range of notable landmarks.

There are three main ethnic groups and languages in Kogi: Igala people, Anebira, and Okun, with others such as Bassa Nge of Bassa L.G.A, Kupa and Kakanda speakers, who are a people of Nupe extraction under Lokoja L.G.A., Bassa which is also of Bassa, Lokoja and Koto Local government areas, Oworo people, Ogori Magongo, and Idoma.

The name Nigeria, was coined in Lokoja by Flora Shaw in the hill of Mount Patti, the future wife of Baron Lugard, a British colonial administrator, while gazing out at the river Niger .

She, Flora Shaw is the daughter of an English father, Captain George Shaw, and a French mother, Marie Adrienne Josephine, a local of Mauritius (née Desfontaines; 1826–1871).

== Languages ==
Kogi is a multi-ethnic state with over multiple indigenous languages spoken in the state. Common languages include Ebira, Igala, Yoruba, Okun, Nupe, Kakanda, Kupa, Basa (Komu, Nge), Hausa.

The Okun language is spoken in the Kogi West Senatorial District

== Religion ==
Kogi is religiously diverse with about 45% of the state's population are Muslim with about 40% being Christian and the remaining 15% following traditional ethnic religions minorities.

Sheikh Aminu Sha'aban was turbaned as the Imam of Lokoja in December 2019.

The Ecclesiastical Province of Lokoja with the Anglican Church of Nigeria led by Archbishop Daniel Abubakar Yisa covers Kogi and Niger States and includes the six Dioceses of Ijumu (2008) led by Bishop Paul Olarewaju Ojo (2018), Kabba (1996) led by Bishop Steven Kadoye Akobe (2010), Lokoja (1994) led by Bishop Emmanuel Egbunu (2004), Ogori-Magongo led by Bishop Festus Davies (2009), Okene (2008) led by Bishop Emmanuel Onsachi (2017) and Idah led by Bishop Joseph Musa (2005).

The Catholic Church includes the Diocese of Idah (1968) with 56 parishes under Bishop Anthony Ademu Adaji (2009) and the Diocese of Lokoja (1955 as Kabba) with 43 parishes under Bishop Martin Dada Abejide Olorunmolu (2005), both suffragans of the Archdiocese of Abuja.

== Local government areas ==
Kogi State consists of twenty-one local government areas. Which are:

- Adavi
- Ajaokuta
- Ankpa
- Bassa
- Dekina
- Ibaji
- Idah
- Igalamela-Odolu
- Ijumu
- Kabba/Bunu
- Kogi
- Lokoja
- Mopa-Muro
- Ofu
- Ogori/Magongo
- Okehi
- Okene
- Olamaboro
- Omala
- Yagba East
- Yagba West

== Tourism ==
Niger-Benue Confluence at Lokoja

Tourist attractions in Kogi State include; The Azad's palace of the Ohinoyi of Ebira land, the colonial relics (such as Lord Lugard House), Mount Patti, World War Cenotaph, the confluence of Rivers Niger and Benue, Ogidi (An African town with formations of Igneous Rock mountains and a traditional art & craft industry) and natural land features hills and terrains that serve as hiking trails.

Some tourists visit on day trips from Abuja, which is a two-hour drive away. Kogi State Tourism and Hotels Company Limited was established to promote tourism in the state. The state government plans and harnesses the high potentials of tourism including the development of historical landmarks at Lokoja.

== Transport and communications ==
Kogi State connects the Federal Capital Territory with 22 Southern States.

Federal Highways are:

- A2 north from Benin City in Edo State as the Benin Rd via Okene and Lokoja across the River Niger Abuja-Lokoja Bridge to Abuja as the Lokoja-Abuja-Dawliko Rd,
- A123 west from A1 at Ilorin, Kwara State via Kabba to A2 in Okene,
- A233 east from A2 near Lokoja via Gboloko and Anyigba to Benue State as the Ankpa-Otukpa Rd.

Other major roads include:

- the Pategi-Egbe Rd north from Egbe to Kwara State,
- the Ilorin-Egbe-Lokoja Rd west from Egbe to Kwara State,
- the Kusoti-Abugi Rd west to Kwara State,
- Ankpa-Aukpa Rd east to Benue State,
- Ankpa-Adoka Rd southeast to Benue State at Abakpa as the Ajeke-Epideru Rd,
- southeast from Ejule to Benue State,
- Obolo-Idah Rd south to Enugu State,
- the Ayingba-Ebiya Rd east from Okene across the Niger River by the 2,890 m Ajaokuta-Itobe Bridge (1985).

The River Niger and Benue are both navigable waterways.

Being in close proximity to the federal capital territory, Abuja International Airport serves as the national and international gateway for air travelers from and to the state. Good telecommunications services are available in the state.

== Agriculture and resources ==
Agriculture is the mainstay of the economy. There are many farm products from the state, including coffee, cocoa, palm oil, cashews, groundnuts, maize, cassava, yam, rice and melon.

Mineral resources include coal, limestone, iron, petroleum and tin. The state is home to the Ajaokuta Steel Company Limited, the largest iron and steel industry in Nigeria and the Obajana Cement Factory, one of the largest cement factories in Africa.

== Education ==
Kogi State has many higher education schools. These include:

- Federal University, Lokoja
- Kogi State University, Anyigba
- Confluence University of Science and Technology, Osara
- Kogi State University, Kabba
- Federal Polytechnic, Idah
- Kogi State Polytechnic, Lokoja
- Federal College of Education, Okene
- Kogi State College of Education, Ankpa
- College of Agriculture, Kabba
- Kogi State College of Education (Technical), Kabba
- Salem University, Lokoja (privately owned)

There are many schools of nursing and midwifery in Anyigba and Obangede, a School of health tech in Idah, and ECWA School of Nursing in Egbe.

== Sports ==
Kogi State has produced sprinters and other sportsmen, who have contributed to the growth of sports worldwide. Kogi United and Babanawa F.C. are football teams based in the state. Other sports, such as swimming, handball, and table tennis, are actively promoted in the state.

Sportsmen from the state include Shola Ameobi who played football as a striker for Newcastle United and for other English Premier League teams. Sunday Bada was a 400 metre sprinter who won three medals at the World Indoor Championships, including a gold medal in 1997, and won a gold medal with the Nigerian team in the 4 × 400 metres relay at the 2000 Olympics.

== Politics ==
The State government is led by a democratically elected governor who works closely with members of the state's house of assembly. The capital city of the state is Lokoja.

=== Electoral system ===
The electoral system of each state is selected using a modified two-round system. To be elected in the first round, a candidate must receive the plurality of the vote and over 25% of the vote in at least two -thirds of the State's and local government Areas. If no candidate passes the threshold, a second round will be held between the top candidate and the next candidate to have received a plurality of votes in the highest number of local government Areas.

== Senate ==
Three senators have represented Kogi state since the return of democracy in 1999. The state is divided into three senatorial districts, with Kogi East, Kogi West and Kogi Central returning one senator each.

== Notable people ==
- Halima Abubakar, Nollywood Actress.
- Segun Adaju, entrepreneur, CEO of Consistent Energy Limited and President, of Renewable Energy Association Nigeria (REAN).
- Pius Adesanmi, Nigerian-born Canadian professor, writer, literary critic, satirist, and columnist.
- Smart Adeyemi, former senator representing Kogi West senatorial district.
- Nasir Ajanah, former chief Judge of Kogi State.
- S. A. Ajayi, Nigerian statesman who helped negotiate Nigeria's independence, former minister of forestry and former minister of education.
- Seth Sunday Ajayi, scientist, scholar, and first African Professor Emeritus of Wildlife Ecology.
- Esther Titilayo Akinlabi, academic who is professor of mechanical engineering at Colorado State University.
- Natasha Akpoti, Nigerian Politician, activist and current serving senator representing Kogi central senatorial district (2023–present)
- Shola Ameobi, former professional footballer who played as a striker.
- Tolulope Arotile (1995–2020), Nigerian Air Force female helicopter pilot.
- Sefi Atta, novelist, short-story writer, playwright, and screenwriter.
- Abubakar Audu, first civilian and two-term governor of the state (1992–1993 and 1999–2003).
- Yahaya Bello, governor of Kogi State (2016–2024).
- Joseph Benjamin, Actor.
- Darey - Darey Art Alade.
- Tunde Ednut - Blogger and Musician
- Abiodun Faleke, business management/logistics consultant and politician.
- Ibrahim Idris, former governor of the state (2003–2008; 2008–2012).
- Jaywon, Musician.
- David Jemibewon, retired Major-General who was military governor of the now defunct Western State, and later minister of police affairs in the cabinet of President Olusegun Obasanjo.
- Mercy Johnson, Nollywood Actress.
- Sunday Karimi - Former House of Representative Member, Yagba Federal Constituency. Senator representing Kogi West Senatorial District 2023–Present
- Joseph Makoju, former GM of NEPA.
- Dino Melaye, former Senator from Kogi West.
- Oladele John Nihi, former President, National Youth Council of Nigeria 2019–2020. Vice President West Africa, Pan-African Youth Union (2021–present).
- John Obaro, technology entrepreneur, public speaker, and founder of SystemSpecs Nigeria Limited.
- James Ocholi - Lawyer and former Nigerian Minister
- Ahmed Usman Ododo, governor of Kogi State since 2024.
- Bayo Ojo, former attorney general of Nigeria.
- Nike Davies-Okundaye, Nigerian batik and Adire textile designer.
- Jide Omokore, prominent businessman with interests spanning oil trading/exploration, marine, haulage services, steel, dredging engineering, and property development.
- Edward Onoja, chief of staff to Governor Yahaya Bello (2016–2019), deputy governor of Kogi State (2019–2024)
- Praiz, songwriter, Artiste.
- Theophilus Sunday (born 1987 in Dekina), gospel musician
- Alhaji Idris Alhassan Yusuf Tawari, the Agụma of Tawari, Nigeria.
- Idris Wada, former governor of the state (2012–2016).
- Nuhu Omeiza Yaqub - Professor of Political Science, former Vice-Chancellor of University of Abuja and founding VC of Sokoto State University.
- Folashade Yemi-Esan, head of the civil service of the federation.
- Danladi Mohammed Zakari, first military administrator of Kogi State.
- Juwon Lawal, founder of Crestal Group

== See also ==
- Itaakpa rock shelter
