= Dino Melaye =

Nigerian politician

Daniel Dino Melaye
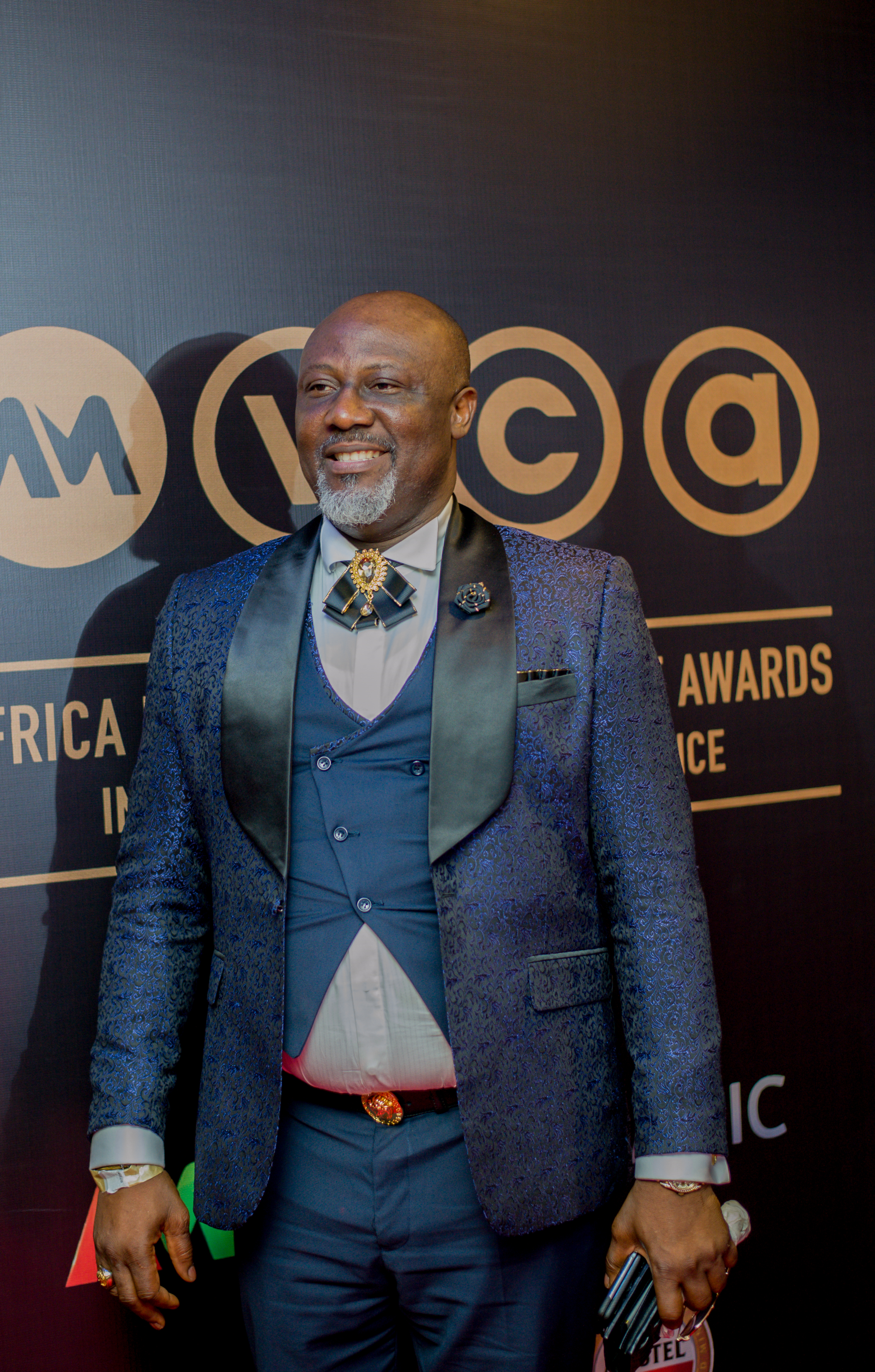

Senator
- In office June 2015 – 11 October 2019
- Preceded by: Smart Adeyemi
- Succeeded by: Smart Adeyemi
- Constituency: Kogi West

Personal details
- Born: Dino Daniel Melaye; 7 January 1974 (age 52) Kano, Nigeria
- Party: African Democratic Congress (ADC)
- Education: Ahmadu Bello University
- Website: http://Senatordinomelaye.com

Barrister Daniel Dino Melaye (born 7 January 1974) is a Nigerian lawyer (having recently graduated from a law degree program in 2025. He is a former senator and a former member of the National Assembly of Nigeria, representing the Kogi West Senatorial District in Kogi State.

Melaye is from Ayetoro Gbede in Ijumu Local Government Area of Kogi State.

Melaye is a former senator and member of the House of Representatives and also a member of the African Democratic Congress. In 2015 he defected to All Progressives Congress (APC) but returned to PDP in the build-up to 2019 elections after months of political struggle with Kogi State governor, Yahaya Bello. He was chairman of the Senate Committee on Federal Capital Territory (FCT) Abuja and briefly chairman of the Senate Committee on Aviation in Nigeria. He was the spokesperson of 2023 presidential candidate of People's Democratic Party, Atiku Abubakar. In July 2025, Melaye resigned from the People's Democratic Party and joined the African Democratic Congress (ADC).

== Early life and education ==
Dino Melaye was born in Kano State, Nigeria. He attended Abdulaziz Attah Memorial College, Okene for his secondary school education. He graduated from Ahmadu Bello University, Zaria in 2000, where he studied geography . He led the National Association of Nigerian Students (NANS) and later became the Secretary-General of African Youth Council and then that of the Commonwealth Youth Council. He was appointed by President Olusegun Obasanjo to chair the Presidential Advisory Council on Youths.

== Political life ==
In 2015, he decamped to the People's Democratic Party where he was re-elected as a member of the House of Representatives representing Kabba/Ijumu federal constituency. In the 2015 Senatorial election he was elected a member of the Senate of Nigeria from the Kogi-West.

He seconded the nomination of Senator Bukola Saraki as candidate for the office of President of the Senate following a nomination made by Senator Ahmad Sani Yerima. He was re-elected on 23 February 2019 to return as senator representing kogi-West senatorial district to be a member of the 9th Senate. His main challenger in the election, Sen Adeyemi of the APC approached Election Petitions Tribunal asking the tribunal to annul the election of Melaye. On 23 August 2019 the tribunal sacked Melaye and ordered a re-run election. After several confrontations with the Federal Government and his State Government, Senator Dino Melaye lost his Appeal to retain his senatorial seat on 11 October 2019 and a re-run election was immediately ordered to be conducted by the Independent National Electoral Commission (INEC). INEC however moved for the election to be conducted on a later date from the State governorship election slated for 16 November 2019; however, Senator Dino Melaye moved and petitioned INEC for his rerun election to be conducted on same day as the state governorship election. Reacting to a claim from Senator Dino that the state Governor, Yahaya Bello, is perfecting plans to rig the election in favor of his favorite candidate, Senator Smart Adeyemi.

Senator Dino Melaye with a margin of over 20,000 votes, lost to his political rival, Smart Adeyemi in an election that was later declared inconclusive by INEC due to violence and electoral irregularities in over 50 Polling Units in the senatorial district. A make-up Election was however fixed for 30 November 2019, after which it was alleged that Senator Dino Melaye was planning to boycott the election, but was however seen casting his vote on the election day.

The supplementary election suffered a low turn out of electorates; this could be due to the high level of harassment, killings, and intimidation faced during the main election. Senator Smart Adeyemi was able to defeat Senator Dino Melaye still maintaining almost the same margin as the general election. The results of the election was however believed to have been tampered with by the State Government in favor of Smart Adeyemi. Smart Adeyemi has since been sworn in as a replacement for Senator Dino Melaye by the Senate President.

=== Governorship ambition ===
Dino Melaye contested for the Kogi State gubernatorial election which was held on 16 November 2019. On 3 September 2019, He lost his gubernatorial ambition in a keenly contested primary election where he came third, with a total of 70 votes behind Engr. Musa Wada who won with 748 votes.

He has been declared the winner of the 2023 Peoples Democratic Party (PDP) governorship primary election in Kogi state, to be deputized by Hon. Habeebat Deen.

He lost the 2023 Kogi State Governorship Election as he came third with 46,362 votes and Ahmed Usman Ododo who emerged winner from the All progress Congress (APC) and Muritala Ajaka from the Social Democratic Party (SDP) coming second with 259,052 votes.

=== Bills and motions sponsored ===
Dino Melaye sponsored about 20 bills and moved over 30 motions in the 8th national assembly. One of such bills is "A Bill for an Act to provide for the Establishment of a Federal University of Agriculture, Kabba. During his tenure his government provisions for its due management, administration and other related matters, 2017 (S.B. 402)."

Other bills were passed by his government which was sponsored by him which include: "A Bill for the prohibition of persons from lynching, mob action and extrajudicial executions", It seeks to protect crime suspects from extrajudicial and summary executions by offering statutory protection. The disability integration bill, protection against domestic violence act are other bills sponsored by Sen. Melaye.

He sponsored the bill to checkmate the discrepancies in subsidy Payments and non-remittance of Fund by the NNPC to the Federation Account. 2017.

Dino was said to regret supporting Buhari in the 2015 general election.

== Political controversies and scandals ==
As a senator, it was alleged that Melaye continued to operate a checking and savings account with a US bank, in violation of Nigeria law, a report he has not denied. Nigeria's Code of Conduct Bureau prohibits the use of foreign accounts by elected and public officials.

One transaction on Melaye's Bank of America debit card is an approved payment to the New York-based Schweiger Dermatology for $1,000. The company describes itself as a medical and cosmetic dermatology service offering a variety of skin healthcare needs.

Melaye had dodged questions towards his operations with these bank accounts, despite evidence provided including transaction dates, bank statements, card numbers, and location of the transactions.

Melaye had threatened to beat up Senator Oluremi Tinubu and ‘impregnate’ her on the floor of the Senate.

In June 2017, a process to recall Senator Melaye from the National Assembly was kickstarted.

The Senator characteristically has accused the Kogi state governor of "shooting the moon and boxing the air."

Melaye further said, "Spending over one billion naira taxpayers money on an unproductive venture, when salaries and pensions have not been paid, is wicked. I will continue to defend the poor and defenceless masses of Kogi state. If I die, I die. We must rescue the state." He was arrested 23 April 2018 on the international wing of Nnamdi Azikiwe Airport by NIS as they claim his name was on the watch list of the Interpol after the Nigeria police declared him wanted.

On 2 May 2018, Senator Melaye was arraigned in court by the Police on Wednesday at Chief Magistrate Court in Wuse Abuja. He was granted bail in the sum of N90million by the court, having met the bail condition but was rearrested by the police shortly after his release.

On 24 July 2018 Melaye alongside 13 other senators of the All Progressives Congress, APC, defected to the Peoples Democratic Party, PDP.

A seven-day siege was placed on his Abuja Maitama residence by the personnel of the force. Melaye surrendered to the police on 4 January 2019. The police allege that He was involved in the shooting of a police officer, Sgt Danjuma Saliu in Kogi State in July 2018.

On 11 January 2019, Melaye in protest, slept on the verandah of the DSS hospital in Abuja after he was moved there by police personnel.

In November 2020, Melaye informs BBC News that he made billions of Naira after buying a McDonald's franchise earlier in his life contrary to the opinion that he made all his money from politics.

== Certificate scandal ==
Melaye was involved in a certificate scandal in 2017 including his claim to have obtained a Bachelor of Science degree in geography from Ahmadu Bello University and a degree from the Boston-based Ivy League Harvard University in the United States. Most of his claims have as yet not been verified. Melaye insists on the truth of his claims. However, his colleague and former majority leader of his then political party (APC) Sen. Ali Ndume called for the senate to probe Melaye's claims. Melaye claims not only did he graduate from ABU Zaria, but earned seven degrees from various institutions around the world including Harvard University, Kennedy School for Educational Leadership and the London School of Economics and Political Science (LSE), a claim that was since refuted by both institutions, with Harvard claiming Melaye only presented himself for a week-long professional development course in late 2016. LSE found no evidence on its database that Melaye obtained any degree there.

Melaye was eventually cleared by the Vice-Chancellor of Ahmadu Bello University, Ibrahim Garba who appeared before the Senate Committee to confirm that Senator Dino Melaye graduated from the school, although under a different name.

== Personal life ==
Melaye was married to Tokunbo Melaye for ten years and they have three children.. She filed for divorce after a case of domestic violence.

Melaye is known for his preference for contemporary designer fashions. He frequently wears expensive streetwear from brands such as Givenchy and Balenciaga. Several of his signature looks include fitted hats which say "SDM", standing for "Senator Dino Melaye".

== Authorship ==
In May 2016, Dino Melaye launched a book titled "Antidotes For Corruption: The Nigerian Story" which received backlash, given the perceived reputation of the author. The backlashes increased at the event as it was headed by the Senate President, Bukola Saraki, and former First Lady of Nigeria, Dame Patience Jonathan, who were both entangled in different corruption cases.

The book was also berated for its poor syntax, as 'antidotes' was expected to take the preposition 'to' against the 'for' that was used in the title. Some quarters also described the book to be a mere "cut and paste" of newspapers articles. suggesting that the book has little or no original intellectual inputs from the author.

== Awards and recognitions ==
Melaye has won several awards, including Best Honourable Representative of the Year by Global Youth Awareness and Development Initiative, Protector of the Youth P.D.P National Youth Vanguard, Epitome of Servant by National Association of Kogi State Students, Youth Libra for Award by the Visioners Club of Kogi State, the Great Motivator of Students by Nigerian Economic Student Association, Icon of Good Leadership by Kogi Peoples Forum, 2008 Diplomatic Member of the year by St Monica's College Kabba and the most performed National Legislator by Vision 2020 Youth Group. Most vibrant Honourable member, Abuja merit Awards African Parliamentarian of the year 2005 in U.S.A. Melaye also won the 'Senator of the year' award in 2017 and 2018.
