= Natasha Akpoti =

Nigerian politician (born 1979)

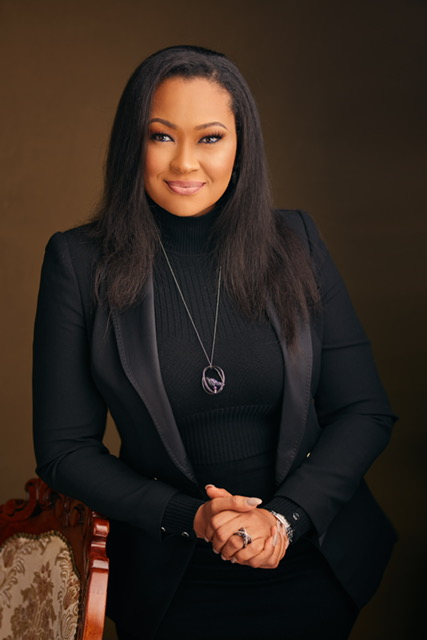
- Official portrait, 2023

Senator for Kogi Central
- Incumbent
- Assumed office November 2023
- Preceded by: Abubakar Sadiku Ohere
- Constituency: Kogi Central

Personal details
- Born: Natasha Hadiza Akpoti; 9 December 1979 (age 46)
- Party: People Democratic Party
- Other political affiliations: Social Democratic Party
- Education: University of Abuja University of Dundee
- Occupation: Barrister, politician
- Known for: Revival of Ajaokuta Steel Mill
- Website: natashaakpoti.com

Natasha Hadiza Akpoti (born 9 December 1979) is a Nigerian politician and lawyer who serves as a member of the 10th Nigeria National Assembly representing Kogi Central Senatorial District since 2023. A member of the People's Democratic Party, she is the first elected female senator in Kogi State.

Born to a Nigerian father and Ukrainian mother, Akpoti was educated at the University of Abuja. Before joining politics and campaigning for senate during the 2019 Kogi State gubernatorial election under the Social Democratic Party, she founded the Builders Hub Impact Investment Program (BHIIP). Akpoti was awarded the by Jewel Taylor, the former vice president of Liberia. Following her activism for the revival of the Ajaokuta Steel Mill, she received the presidential award from the Nigerian Society of Engineers in December 2017. She was elected a senator under the People's Democratic Party in 2023.

== Early life and education ==
Natasha Hadiza Akpoti was born in Ilorin, Kwara state, on December 9, 1979, The second child of Jimoh Abdul Akpoti a Nigerian politician from Kogi State and Ludmila Kravchenk Rakitna, originally from Chernivtsi, Ukraine. Her parents first met in the Soviet Union, where Jimoh was a medical student at Bogomolets National Medical University. She grew up in Ihima, Okehi.

Akpoti attended her primary education at Christ the King School, Okene, Kogi State. And a brief secondary education at Government Girls Unity Secondary School in Oboroke, Kogi. She continued at Federal Government College, Idoani in Ondo state, where she graduated in 1997. Akpoti and her family relocated to Abuja, after her father's death on 3 November 1998. She later got admitted into the University of Abuja, where she obtained her bachelor's degree in law from 2000 to 2004. At 19, she got married and had a son, Daniel.

Natasha Akpoti graduated from Nigerian Law School Bwari, Abuja. She was called to the Nigerian Bar by the Nigerian Body of Benchers on the 8 November 2005. She started studying at the University of Dundee for her Master of Laws degree, which she obtained in 2011 as well as her MBA in Oil and Gas Management in 2012.

== Career ==
=== Early career (2007–2018) ===
Akpoti worked as a legal counsel at Brass LNG from 2007 to 2010. In 2015, she established Builders Hub Impact Investment Program and further embarked on a journey to become a social entrepreneur and reformer. Akpoti applied for INSEAD Social Entrepreneurship program in Singapore where she acquired applicable knowledge on smart innovative sustainable solutions for tackling neglected problems at all levels of the society in 2016. She came to limelight when she presented an investigative report to the National Assembly on 1 March 2018 that exposed corruption at the Ajaokuta steel mill. The report was opposed by the Ministry of Mines and Steel Development, accusing Akpoti of misinformation. Another group alleges that she is sponsoring a campaign. After a legal hearing by the High Court sitting in Abuja, The Authority Newspaper, Ifeanyi Ubah and Williams Orji were ordered to pay 10 million naira to Akpoti for libelous publication against her.

=== Nigerian Senator (2023–present) ===
Akpoti first contested as a Senator to represent Kogi Central senatorial district in the National Assembly under PDP. She lost the election to candidate of the All Progressives Congress, Abubakar Sadiku Ohere.

She was declared winner by The Court of Appeal in Abuja hearing 2023 Kogi Central Senatorial election dispute.

== Legal issues ==
In February 2025, Akpoti alleged on Arise TV that Godswill Akpabio, the Senate president sexually harassed her on 8 December 2023. The sexual harassment case escalated on 20 February 2025 after she confronted Akpabio for relocating her seat in the chamber through removing her name-plate, and Akpabio has denied the allegations.

Akpoti's petition on Akpabio's sexual harassment was summarily dismissed without investigation on the basis of a technicality, i.e. that she had "signed it herself". The head of the Senate's Committee on Ethics and Privileges, Senator Imasuen described it as "dead on arrival".

On 6 March 2025, following the report from the Senate's Committee on Ethics and Privileges, Akpoti was suspended from the Nigerian Senate for six months for misconduct. The suspension cites her violation of Sections 6.1 and 6.2 of the 2023 Standing Orders of the Nigerian Senate, and includes lack of access to her office, salary, and security. In addition the Committee advised her to apologise to the Senate President for the sexual harassment allegations, a suggestion which was put to the vote a number of times in the Senate. Senator Michael Opeyemi Bamidele also clarified that the suspension was due to Akpoti's "persistent acts of misconduct" including; refusing to sit in her assigned seat; speaking without recognition; engaging in disruptive behavior; and making abusive remarks against the leadership of the Senate.

In a follow-up, Akpabio's legal team led by former Nigerian Bar Association President Olisa Agbakoba demanded a retraction of the allegation, describing it as "clearly false and unsubstantiated". Agbakoba cited contradictions in Akpoti-Uduaghan's timeline—particularly her public praise of Akpabio on social media a day after the alleged incident—and noted that the referenced post was later deleted, which he argued further undermined her credibility.

Akpoti further presented her case in a United Nations forum, during the Women in Parliament session in New York. In her statement she outlined her allegations and the fact of her subsequent suspension, insisted that she would not apologise for her allegations, and sought international intervention to hold to account the Nigerian Senate.

Following Akpoti's suspension, many civil groups and individuals including the Conference of Nigeria Political Parties and the Coalition of National Civil Society Organizations have called for a transparent investigation of the matter. Atedo Peterside, founder of Stanbic IBTC also condemned the suspension, describing it as "disturbing and disrespectful to her constituents".

On April 18, 2025, Akpoti reported that armed men had attacked her family home in Obeiba-Ihima, Kogi State. In a statement released by her media team in Abuja, the senator stated that the assailants raided and vandalized the residence, which originally belonged to her grandfather. The attack, which occurred on April 16, was reportedly repelled by security forces, preventing further damage or casualties.

On 4 July 2025, a court in Abuja ordered the lifting of Akpoti's suspension, saying that it was excessive. It also convicted Akpoti for contempt and fined her five million naira ($3,250) for violating a gag order on her suspension case. Despite this, Akpoti was barred from entering the National Assembly building on 22 July.

== Awards and honours ==
Akpoti was awarded the "Politician of the Year" in the 2023 Leadership Excellence Awards, an award run by Nigerian media newspaper, Leadership. She was called "a proven amazon in political circles". In 2024, along Boma Goodhead, she was shortlisted for the African Iconic Women Recognition Awards (AIWRA). She won the This Day Senator of the Year award in 2025. In 2026, she was a joint recipient of Tranforming Lives Award organized by the University of Dundee.

== Personal life ==
On 5 March 2022, she married Emmanuel Uduaghan in a marriage ceremony at Ihima, and has three children.

== Activism ==
Akpoti champions women’s equality and believes that women’s stories must be digitally included, as the future of women’s empowerment lies in bridging gaps by documenting their stories. She has also been involved in rallying youths to engage in active civic participation by revalidating their Permanent Voter’s Card (PVC).

In 2024, she called for greater women’s empowerment and echoed feminist voices that women deserve equal voice and rights.
