= Smart Adeyemi =

Nigerian politician

Senator for Kogi West
- Incumbent
- Assumed office March 2019
- Preceded by: Dino Melaye

Personal details
- Born: 18 August 1960 (age 65) Kogi State, Nigeria
- Party: APC

Smart Adeyemi (born 18 August 1960 at Iyara in Ijumu Local Government Area of Kogi State) was elected Senator for the Kogi West constituency of Kogi State, Nigeria, taking office on 29 May 2007. He is a member of the APC. Re-elected as senator for the third time on the 30th of November 2019.

== Early years ==
Smart Adeyemi was born on 18 August 1960.

He earned a post-graduate diploma in Public Relations, diploma in Law, advanced diploma in Mass Communication, and master's in Public Administration from the Federal University of Technology Owerri, and became a journalist.

He was National President of the Nigerian Union of Journalists from 1999 to 2006.

== Political career ==
Adeyemi was elected to the Senate in April 2007. On assuming his Senate seat he was appointed to committees on Privatization, Industry, Federal Character & Inter-Government Affairs (Chairman), Federal Capital Territory and Appropriation. He was also appointed vice chairman of the Northern Senators Forum.

In a mid-term evaluation of Senators in May 2009, ThisDay noted that Adeyemi had worked on bills on the State of the Nation Address and the Code of Conduct Bureau and Tribunal Act amendment, and sponsored three motions.

In May 2010 the Daily Sun said Adeyemi had asked the Economic and Financial Crimes Commission (EFCC) to start an investigation of members of the National Assembly who he alleged were corrupt. Adeyemi said that he had been misquoted. He said, "I never said this National Assembly is corrupt [...] but if there are a few that are corrupt the EFCC should go ahead to expose them."

Despite his denial, Senate President David Mark announced a six-man ad hoc committee to investigate the issue, describing it as serious allegation. The committee was to be chaired by Senate Chief Whip Kanti Bello and to include Senators Ayogu Eze, Olorunnimbe Mamora, James Manager, Adamu Talba and Zainab Kure.

Adeyemi's allegation was similar to one made by Senator Nuhu Aliyu from Niger State in January 2008, which caused a similar strong reaction from the other legislators.

Adeyemi won the PDP primary to compete for re-election as Kogi West Senator in the April 2011 elections. However, a court nullified the PDP primary election on 4 April 2011, saying it did not follow due process as defined in the electoral act.

A fresh primary was run on 7 April, in which Adeyemi defeated his opponent Abiye Abinso by 1,124 votes to two. In the elections of 9 April 2011, Adeyemi retained his seat.

Adeyemi recently won for the third time, a senatorial seat to represent Kogi West Senatorial District; defeating Senator Dino Melaye in a supplementary election ordered by the country's apex court, for a fresh election to be conducted after Senator Dino Melaye's victory was nullified. Adeyemi won with a margin of over 20,000 votes.
