= Kogi Central senatorial district =

Senatorial district in Nigeria

Kogi Central Senatorial District covers 5 local government areas which include, Adavi, Ajaokuta, Okehi, Okene, and Ogori-Mangogo. The current representative is Natasha Akpoti.

== List of Representatives ==
Senator	Party	Year	Assembly
Ahmed Tijani Ahmed	PDP	1999–2003	4th
Mohammed Ohiare	PDP	2003–2007	5th
Otaru Salihu Ohize	AC	2007–2011	6th
Nurudeen Abatemi Usman	PDP	2011–2015	7th
Ahmed Ogembe	PDP	2015–2019	8th
Yakubu Oseni	APC	2019–2023	9th
Natasha Akpoti	PDP	2023-present	10th
