= Deputy governor of Kogi State =

Second highest-ranking official in the executive branch of Kogi State in Nigeria

Deputy Governor of Kogi State
- Flag of Kogi State
- Incumbent; Salifu Joel since 27 January 2024
- Executive Branch of the Kogi State Government
- Style: Deputy Governor (informal); His Excellency (courtesy)
- Status: Second highest executive branch officer
- Member of: Kogi State Executive Branch; Kogi State Cabinet
- Seat: Lokoja
- Nominator: Gubernatorial candidate
- Appointer: Direct popular election or, if vacant, Governor via House of Assembly confirmation
- Term length: Four years; renewable once
- Constituting instrument: Constitution of Nigeria
- Inaugural holder: Patrick Adaba (Fourth Republic)
- Succession: First
- Website: kogistate.gov.ng

The deputy governor of Kogi State is the second-highest officer in the executive branch of the government of Kogi State, Nigeria, after the governor of Kogi State, and ranks first in line of succession. The deputy governor is directly elected together with the governor to a four-year term of office.

Salifu Joel is the current deputy governor, having assumed office on 27 January 2024.

== Responsibilities ==
The deputy governor assists the governor in exercising primary assignments and is also eligible to replace a dead, impeached, absent or ill Governor as required by the 1999 Constitution of Nigeria.

== List of deputy governors ==
Name	Took office	Left office	Time in office	Party	Elected	Governor
Patrick Adaba (born 1946)	29 May 1999	29 May 2003	4 years	All People's Party	1999	Abubakar Audu
Philip Salawu (born 1957)	29 May 2003	6 February 2008	4 years, 253 days	Peoples Democratic Party	2003; 2007	Ibrahim Idris
Philip Salawu (born 1957)	5 April 2008	26 January 2012	3 years, 296 days	Peoples Democratic Party	2008	Ibrahim Idris
Yomi Awoniyi (born 1960)	27 January 2012	27 January 2016	4 years	Peoples Democratic Party	2011	Idris Wada
Simon Achuba (born 1964)	9 February 2016	18 October 2019	3 years, 251 days	All Progressives Congress	2015	Yahaya Bello
Edward Onoja (born 1974)	21 October 2019	27 January 2024	4 years, 98 days	All Progressives Congress	2019	Yahaya Bello
Salifu Joel (born 1967)	27 January 2024	Incumbent	2 years, 285 days	All Progressives Congress	2023	Usman Ododo

== See also ==
- List of governors of Kogi State
