= Vivour =

Vivour is surname common in West Africa. It is a contraction of the word Survivor.

== Notable people with the surname ==
- Akinwunmi Rhodes-Vivour, Nigerian jurist
- Bode Rhodes-Vivour, Nigerian jurist
- Gbadebo Rhodes-Vivour, Nigerian politician and architect
- William Allen Vivour, 19th century planter from Equatorial Guinea
