= Elections in Nigeria =

Elections in Nigeria involve choosing representatives for the federal government of Nigeria as well as the various states in the Fourth Nigerian Republic. Elections in Nigeria began in 1959 with several political parties. It's a method of choosing leaders for which the citizens have the right to vote and to be voted for. In 2023, Nigerians were getting ready for presidential elections with about 93.4 million eligible voters across the federation. Elections in Nigeria are held in all tiers of the government. The presidential election, the national assembly elections, the governorship elections and the local government elections.

== Background ==
Prior to Elections in 1955 , Nigeria had an earlier election in 1923, carried out under the colonial governor Hugh Clifford.

An electoral system was introduced where Nigerians elect a President of Nigeria to act as head of state. The winner must have the highest number of votes and at least 25% in each of two thirds of the states and the capital territory. If no one meets both criteria, there would be a second round between the top two vote-getters.

At the same time voters elect the Nigerian National Assembly which acts as the legislature. The National Assembly has two chambers: the House of Representatives, with 360 members, each elected for a four-year term in single-seat constituencies, and the Senate, with 109 members, elected for a four-year term. The thirty-six states are divided into three senatorial districts, each of which is represented by one senator, and the Federal Capital Territory which is also represented by one senator.

Nigeria has a multi-party system, with two or three strong parties and a third party that is electorally successful. However, members of the People's Democratic Party (PDP) have controlled the presidency since elections resumed in 1999 until 2015 when Muhammadu Buhari won the presidential election.

== Disinformation in Nigeria Elections ==
Nigeria elections has history of disinformation, misinformation threaten the integrity of Nigeria elections such as fake news, fake election results, fake news of polling unit violence and fraudulent statements to discredits candidates. Presently, disinformation and misinformation is done through social media platform which are changing of election dates, fake claims with real news to drive user engagement. Ahead of 2027 general elections Nigerians have experience fake news about elections dates, discredited information about candidacy of difference parties through the uses of artificial intelligence.

=== Reruns ===
From 2003 to 2019, 503 elections were annulled and rerun in Nigeria. The national ruling party won 93% of rerun elections, while it won only 54% of other elections.

== 1923 elections ==
Electoral regulations passed on 1 June 1923, setting out details of how the elections would be carried out.

== 1999 elections ==
Presidential elections were held on 27 February 1999. These were the first elections since the 1993 military coup, and the first elections of the Fourth Nigerian Republic.

== 2003 elections ==
Presidential elections were held on 19 April 2003.

== 2007 elections ==
The 2007 general was held on 14 April where governorship and state assembly representatives were elected. A week later, on 21 April, the presidential and national assembly elections took place. The late Umaru Yar'Adua won the highly controversial election for the People's Democratic Party (PDP) and was sworn in on 29 May.

The ruling PDP won 26 of the 32 states, according to the Independent National Electoral Commission (INEC), including Kaduna State and Katsina State, where the results were contested by the local population.

Following the presidential election, groups monitoring the election gave it a dismal assessment. Chief European Union observer, Max van den Berg, reported that the handling of the polls had "fallen far short" of basic international standards, and that "the process cannot be considered to be credible". A spokesman for the United States Department of State said it was "deeply troubled" by election polls, calling them "flawed", and said they hoped the political parties would resolve any differences over the election through peaceful, constitutional means.

== 2011 elections ==
A parliamentary election was held on 9 April 2011. The election was originally scheduled to be held on 2 April, but was later postponed to 4 April.

A presidential election was held in Nigeria on 16 April 2011, postponed from 9 April 2011. The election followed controversy as to whether a Muslim or Christian should be allowed to become president given the tradition of rotating the top office between the religions and following the death of Umaru Yar'Adua, who was a Muslim, and Goodluck Jonathan, a Christian, assuming the interim presidency.

Following the election, widespread violence took place in the northern parts of the country. Goodluck Jonathan was declared the winner on 19 April. The elections were reported in the international media as having run smoothly with relatively little violence or voter fraud in contrast to previous elections, in particular the widely disputed 2007 election. The United States State Department said the election was "successful" and a "substantial improvement" over 2007, although it added that vote rigging and fraud also took place.

== 2015 elections ==
The 2015 general elections were originally scheduled to be held on 14 February but was later postponed to 28 March (presidential, senatorial, and House of Representatives) and 11 April 2015 (governorship and state house of assembly). General Muhammadu Buhari of the All Progressives Congress emerged as the winner of the presidential elections and was sworn in on 29 May 2015. The 2015 election was a success because there were tensions everywhere concerning the difficult political and security environment of the country at that time. However, It was the first time in the history of Nigeria that an incumbent president lost an election. Goodluck Ebele Johnathan of the People's Democratic Party lost his seat to Muhammadu Buhari of the All Progressives Congress.

== 2019 elections ==
Presidential and National Assembly elections were scheduled for 16 February 2019, while state and local government elections were scheduled for 2 March 2019. Elections were postponed by one week after INEC cited logistic challenges. The rescheduled dates were 23 February and 9 March 2019.

President Muhammadu Buhari was re-elected for another four-year term. The primary contender was former vice-president Atiku Abubakar of the People's Democratic Party (PDP). Kingsley Moghalu of the Young Progressives Party (YPP), Yele Sowore of the African Action Congress (AAC), and Fela Durotoye of the Alliance for a New Nigeria (ANN) were other popular candidates who were all relatively young. Late in 2018, these three parties alongside some others attempted to form a coalition. However, the candidates pulled out of the coalition and decided to continue running on their respective platforms. There are 73 candidates contesting in the presidential election.

The 2019 governorship and state house of assembly election was originally scheduled for 2 March 2019 and rescheduled for Saturday, 9 March 2019. The two major political parties, the All Progressives Congress (APC), and the People's Democratic Party, fielding candidates in the elections across various states except Rivers where a court order prohibits The All Progressives Congress from fielding candidates as a result of an internal crisis with the state chapter of the party.

The 2019 Nigerian general election suffered from unique issues and challenges and also enjoyed successes that had not been witnessed in the previous five elections in Nigeria's Fourth Republic.

== 2023 elections ==
General elections were held in Nigeria on 25 February 2023 to elect the president and vice president and members of the Senate and House of Representatives. 18 candidates campaigned for the top job including Bola tinubu, Peter Obi, Atiku Abubakar. Only one was a woman.

== See also ==
- Censorship in Nigeria
- Electoral calendar
- Electoral system
- Open ballot system
- Nigeria Electoral Act
