= 1991 Kogi State gubernatorial election =

1991 gubernatorial election in Kogi State, Nigeria

Kogi gubernatorial election
- December 14, 1991
Nominee	Abubakar Audu
Party	NRC
Elected Governor
Abubakar Audu
NRC

The 1991 Kogi State gubernatorial election occurred on December 14, 1991. NRC candidate Abubakar Audu won the election.

== Conduct ==
The gubernatorial election was conducted using an open ballot system. Primaries for the two parties to select their flag bearers were conducted on October 19, 1991.

The election occurred on December 14, 1991. NRC candidate Abubakar Audu won the election.
