= Gbadebo Rhodes-Vivour =

Nigerian politician and architect (born 1983)

Chief Gbadebo Rhodes-Vivour
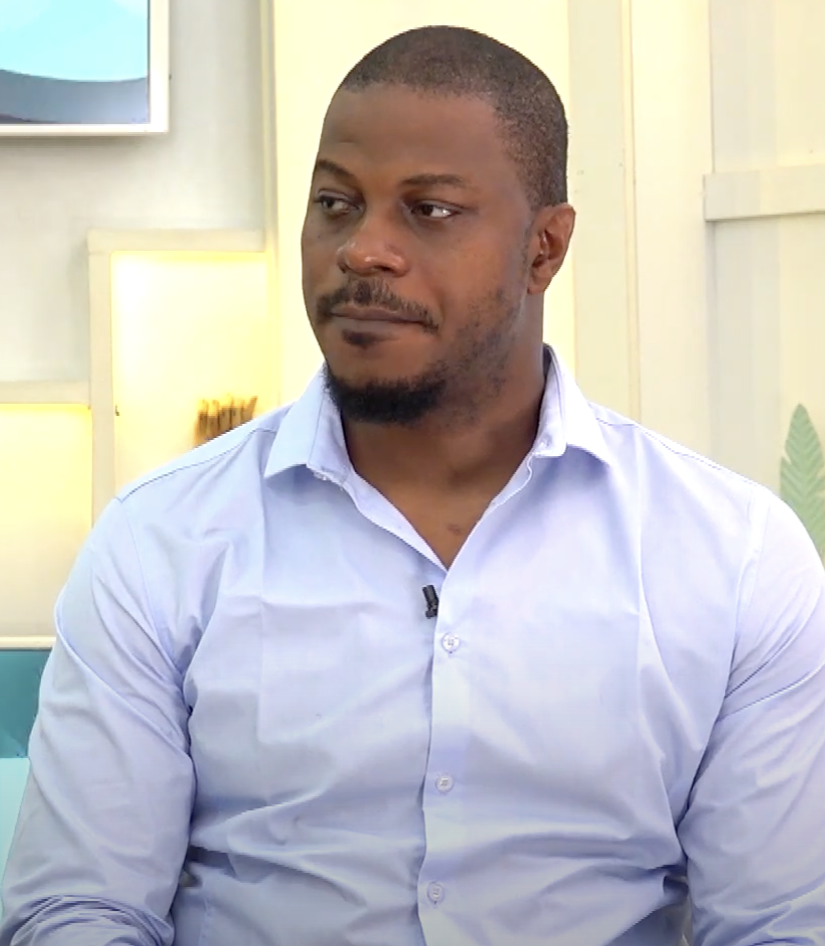
- Born: Gbadebo Patrick Rhodes-Vivour; 8 March 1983 (age 43); Lagos Island, Lagos, Nigeria
- Education: Bachelor of Architecture; Master of Architecture; Master of Research and Public Policy
- Alma mater: University of Nottingham; Massachusetts Institute of Technology; University of Lagos
- Occupations: Architect; politician; activist
- Political party: Labour Party (2022–2025) Africa Democratic Congress (2026-Present)
- Other political affiliations: Peoples Democratic Party (2018–2022)
- Movement: Nigerians Against GMO
- Spouse: Ifeyinwa Aniebo
- Parents: Olawale Rhodes-Vivour; Nkechi Rhodes-Vivour
- Relatives: William Vivour (great-great-grandfather); Steven Bankole Rhodes (great-granduncle); Akinwunmi Rhodes-Vivour (grandfather); Bode Rhodes-Vivour (uncle); Augustine Aniebo (father-in-law)
- Website: www.grvlagos.com

Chief Gbadebo Patrick Chinedu Rhodes-Vivour, also known as G.R.V. (born 8 March 1983), is a Nigerian architect, entrepreneur and politician. He was the gubernatorial candidate of the Labour Party for Lagos State in the 2023 gubernatorial election where he finished runner-up, losing to incumbent governor, Babajide Sanwo-Olu. He was the senatorial candidate of the Peoples Democratic Party for the Lagos West senatorial district in the 2019 Senate elections.

Rhodes-Vivour was installed as the Obalefun of Lagos, a Yoruba chief, in April 2025.

== Education ==
He attended Chrisland Schools (Primary and Secondary), up to JSS3, and then proceeded to Paris to attend École Active Bilingue, where he completed his secondary education. He has a bachelor's degree in architecture from University of Nottingham and a master's degree in the same field from the Massachusetts Institute of Technology (MIT). He partook in the National Youth Service Corps (NYSC) in 2008 after his first master's and completed it in 2009. He later attained a second master's degree in Research and Public Policy from the University of Lagos (UNILAG).

== Background ==
Rhodes-Vivour was born on Lagos Island but grew up in Ikeja, both in Lagos State. Rhodes-Vivour is from a prominent Nigerian family; he is the son of Barrister Olawale and Mrs. Nkechi Rhodes-Vivour. His uncle was a one-time justice of the Supreme Court of Nigeria, Bode Rhodes-Vivour, and his grandfather was the late judge Akinwunmi Rhodes-Vivour. He is also the great-grandnephew of Steven Bankole Rhodes, the second ever indigenous judge appointed in Nigeria, and his great-great-grandfather was the wealthy 19th century planter William Vivour.

== Activism ==
Rhodes-Vivour is the convener of the civil society group, Nigerians Against GMO, an a-GMO advocacy group fighting against the proliferation of Genetically Modified Foods in Nigeria. Their protest increased in 2016, following claims by Monsanto that GMOs are safe, tackling the Nigerian Minister of Agriculture, Akinwumi Adesina, as well as the multinational company.

In 2017, he alongside Nnimmo Bassey, led a 2,000-man march to the Senate to lend a voice in the fight against environmental degradation. He also campaigns for the inclusion of history as a subject in Nigerian school curriculum.

In 2022, Rhodes-Vivour collaborated with WellaHealth to provide free health checks and insurance for many people in Lagos who have their voter's card, in commemoration of World Malaria Day and to encourage residents to obtain their voter's card to enable them vote in upcoming elections.

== Career ==
GRV worked with Franklin Ellis Architects while he was in the UK. On returning to Nigeria, he worked with SISA, Kliff Consulting now called Building Partnership CCP, and Patrick Waheed Architects.

He is the founder of Spatial Tectonics, a design firm focused on unconventional construction methods to achieve affordability. He is a partner to Multi Development Construction Corporation (MDCC). He sits on the board of HomeQube Ltd, E-Terra Technologies and Alkebulan Agro-Allied. He is the chairman of The Rhodes-Vivour Foundation.

== Political career ==
He was one of the first beneficiaries of the Not Too Young To Run legislation. In 2017, Rhodes-Vivour contested the Ikeja Local Government Area chairmanship under the KOWA party. Citing that the absence of godfatherism in the party made him contest under the platform. He lost to the candidate of the incumbent APC.

In 2019, he contested for the senate seat to represent Lagos west under the PDP. His campaign points were to revamp the infrastructure within the district and well as to get out the incumbent who he term as an "absentee senator spending more resources pursuing a futile governorship bid in Ogun State, rather than focus on Lagos West that have already given him their mandate". He came second in the final polls, losing to the incumbent senator and contestant under the erstwhile ruling party APC, Solomon Adeola, by 243,516 votes to Adeola's 323,817. Adeola received 41.38% of the votes, while Rhodes-Vivour received 39.40%. He contested the result in court, citing electoral violence and disruptions as reasons why the result should not be valid. However, the court deemed that not to be enough and upheld the election of his opponent.

He was the Labour party gubernatorial candidate in the 2023 Lagos State gubernatorial election, losing to the incumbent governor, Babajide Sanwo-Olu. He was initially one of the nominees gearing up to contest under the PDP, but pulled out just before the primary election was held. He defected to the Labour Party, contesting during substitute election through which the substantive candidate of the party was to be chosen, and came out victorious, getting 111 votes, to defeat former All Progressives Congress (APC) chieftain Moshood Salvador, who got 102 votes.

== Personal life ==
He is married to Dr. Ify Rhodes-Vivour (née Aniebo), a molecular geneticist by profession, who is the daughter of former military administrator of Kogi and Borno states, Augustine Aniebo.
