= 2015 Kogi State gubernatorial election =

- 21 November 2015
Nominee	Idris Wada	Prince Abubakar Audu
Party	People's Democratic Party	All Progressives Congress
Popular vote	199,514	240,867
Governor before election
Idris Wada
PDP
Elected Governor
Yahaya Bello
APC

The 2015 Kogi State Gubernatorial election was held on 21 November 2015 to elect a governor for Kogi State. The last Kogi state gubernatorial election was held in 2011. The incumbent governor, Captain Idris Wada, ran for re-election against the former governor, Prince Abubakar Audu, the candidate of the All Progressives Congress. Kogi State has a different governorship election calendar from other states of the Nigerian Federation. This happened in 2007, when the Appeal Court affirmed annulment of the election of the incumbent, Ibrahim Idris for electoral irregularities and ordered a fresh election in a case filed by Abubakar Audu.

== Candidates ==
This is a list of Kogi State governorship candidates and their political parties. Although there would have been 22 candidates but Zainab Usman, the candidate of the African Democratic Congress (ADC), announced her withdrawal from the contest on 21 November, asking her supporters to votes for Abubakar Audu. But this was too late to alter election materials, thus her name remained on the ballot paper. Two candidates were prominent, namely Idris Wada (incumbent) of the Peoples Democratic Party and Abubakar Audu of the All Progressives Congress.

Candidate	Party
Prince Abubakar Audu	APC
Captain Idris Wada	PDP
Isah Yakubu Kamaldeen	AA
Dickson F. Fred	A
Ukenya Musa	ACD
Michael Abdullahi	AD
Odufu Cosmas Friday	APA
Akwu Umar Goodman	APGA
Yinka Cherry Oloruntoba	CPP
Philips Ezekiel Koleola	DPC
Abubakar Ibrahim	DPP
Ibrahim Adejoh	ID
Raji Ogirima	KOWA
Philips Omeiza Ozovehe Salawu	LP
Mohammed Ibrahim Dangana	NCP
Mallam Abdul Hussein	NNPP
Emmanuel Daikwo	PD
Emmanuel Enesi Ozigi	PPA
Ojuh Godwin Hussein	PPN
Enema Paul	SDP
Saád Mukailu Yaro	UDP
Usman Zainab	ADC

== Gubernatorial election campaigns ==
Gubernatorial election campaigns by political parties commenced on 24 July 2015, and ended 19 November 2015. The two top contenders campaigned throughout the 21 local governments and 239 wards of the state.

== Results ==
On 22 November 2015, the Independent National Electoral Commission (INEC) announced the results of the election from all the 21 local government areas in the State. Though there were thoughts of possibly violence that resulted in huge deployment of security personnel, election day turned out to be largely peaceful. The election drew a crowd of voters in the election between the opposition APC and the ruling PDP (in Kogi State at the time). The results announced in all the polling units which make up the state for the election were declared by the State Collation/Returning Officer. Prince Abubakar Audu sponsored by the All Progressives Congress (APC) had 240,867 votes while Captain Idris Wada, the incumbent governor, who contested on the platform of the Peoples Democratic Party (PDP) scored 199,514 and came second. The margin between the two candidates was 41,353 votes.

== Election declared inconclusive ==
The candidate of the APC, Abubakar Audu died while election data were being collated for declaration of winner. This threw up confusion as to who would inherit the votes received by the deceased candidate. The Independent National Electoral Commission (INEC), declared the election inconclusive mainly due to the death of the APC candidate, but cited other legal reasons to back its actio. According to results declared by the Returning Officer, Emmanuel Kucha, Abubakar Audu of the All Progressives Congress scored 240,867 while Idris Wada of the Peoples Democratic Party scored 199,514 votes. Mr. Kucha said the margin of votes between Abubakar Audu and Idris Wada is 41,353. And thereby making the election inconclusive because the total number of registered voters in 91 polling units, in 18 local government areas, where election was cancelled is 49,953.

== Supplementary Election ==
The Supplementary Election was conducted on 5 December 2015, in 91 polling units across 18 local government areas in Kogi state. According to the results declared by Mr. Kucha, the APC had 6,885 votes in the supplementary election, bringing the total votes it received to 247,752, having polled 240,857 in the November 21 election. The second runner up, the Peoples Democratic Party and its candidate, Captain Idris Wada, the incumbent governor, scored 5,363 in the supplementary election. Thus, PDP polled a total of 204, 877 votes, having had 199,514 at the November 21 election.

== Declaration of Kogi state Governor ==
The Independent National Electoral Commissioner (INEC) declared Yahaya Bello of the All Progressives Congress following inconclusiveness of the governorship election on November 22. The Returning Officer, Mr. Kucha, declared Mr. Bello winner. Following the conclusion that Yahaya Bello of the APC, satisfied the requirement of the law. Mr. Kucha said, Mr. Bello emerged APC candidate for the supplementary election, after the death of Abubakar Audu on November 22. The deceased won the APC primary election and Yahaya Bello was first runner-up.

== See also ==
- States of Nigeria
- List of state governors of Nigeria
- List of governors of Kogi State
