= 2011 Kogi State gubernatorial election =

State election in Nigeria

- April 26, 2011
Nominee	Idris Wada	Abubakar Audu
Party	PDP	ACN
Popular vote	300,372	159,913
Governor before election
Ibrahim Idris
PDP
Elected Governor
Idris Wada
PDP

The 2011 Kogi State gubernatorial election was the fifth gubernatorial election of Kogi State, Nigeria. Held on December 3, 2011, the People's Democratic Party nominee Idris Wada won the election, defeating Abubakar Audu of the Action Congress of Nigeria.

== Results ==
A total of 19 candidates contested in the election. Idris Wada from the People's Democratic Party won the election, defeating Abubakar Audu from the Action Congress of Nigeria.

2011 Kogi State gubernatorial election
Party	Candidate	Votes	%	±%
PDP	Idris Wada	300,372	58	
ACN	Abubakar Audu	159,913	31	
PDP hold				
