= Steven Bankole Rhodes =

Nigerian judge

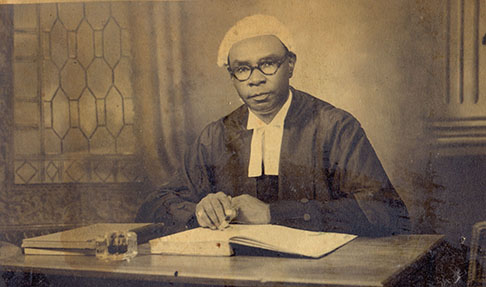
S.B. Rhodes, Esq.

Steven Bankole Rhodes II, C.B.E. (1890–1951) was a Nigerian jurist and administrator. He was one of the founding fathers of both the Nigerian Judiciary and the Executive arm of Nigeria's government, serving successively in the Legislative Council, at the High Court, and in the Executive Council.

On 8 November 1945, he was the second indigenous judge appointed into the Nigerian Judiciary, the first being Justice Jibowu and the third being Justice Ademola. As a pioneer judge, he contributed immensely to the development of Nigerian case law by adapting the principles of the English common law, in their practical content, to the Nigerian environment.

In 1943, he began to serve on the Executive Council of Governor Sir Bernard H. Bourdillon; prior to this, no African had participated directly in policy formulation at the central executive level in Nigeria. He also served on the Legislative Council, representing the Rivers division, prior to his appointment to the Executive Council.

== Birth and background ==
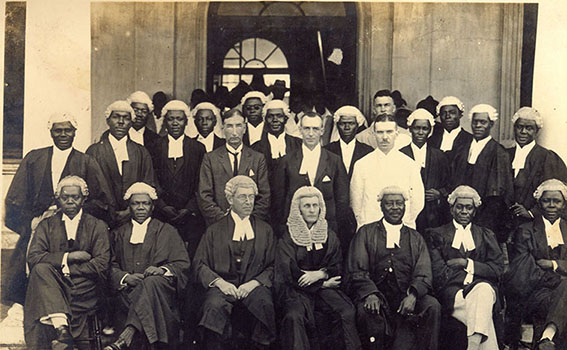
S.B. Rhodes, center back, with his law class as they are called to the bar, Middle Temple.

Steven Bankole Rhodes II was born in 1890, the son of Steven Bankole Rhodes I. His parents were both Saros, members of a community of Recaptive individuals of Nigerian ancestry that had been settled in Sierra Leone by the British following their emancipation and who had later returned to Nigeria. At the time of his birth, this community was part of Nigeria's ascendant bourgeoisie.

== Career ==
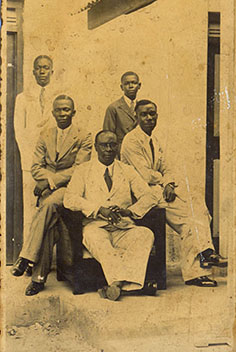
L-R Justice Akinwunmi Rhodes-Vivour (sat on the chair arm), Justice S.B. Rhodes (in the middle, sat on chair), Steve Rhodes (far right)

=== Legislative Council ===
Prior to joining the Legislative Council, S.B. Rhodes had been called to the bar at the Middle Temple in London, and was a practicing lawyer in Nigeria.

On 21 January 1942, Rhodes was nominated as an unofficial member of the Legislative Council of Nigeria, assuming office as the Richards constitution came into force. He had represented various interests in the Legislative Council between 1933 and 1943, serving as a representative of the Rivers division. He was sometimes characterised during this time as a nationalist. In council, he pushed for the nationalisation of all Nigerian industries. He also pushed for more autonomy for the native courts in relation to the firm grip used by the executive, through administrative officers, to control the Native Courts. He asserted that the Native Courts were the most unsatisfactory aspect of the judicial reform of 1933, and called for a reconsideration of the Native Courts Ordinance in November 1937.

=== Judiciary ===
On 9 October 1945, King George VI gave directions for the appointment of Steven Bankole Rhodes C.B.E. as a Puisne Judge of the Supreme Court of Nigeria . He was the first Nigerian lawyer to be elevated to the Supreme Court Bench straight from the Bar, assuming his role on 8 November 1945 .

Others on the Bench included, Puisne Judges O. Jibowu; A.G.B. Manson; H.M.S. Brown; C.T .Abbott; W. Wells Palmer; G.G. Robinson; F.W. Johnston; E. Hallinan and G.R. Gregg.

One of the most famous and controversial cases brought before him was the trial of Heelas Ugokwe, a Nigerian postal worker, for the attempted assassination of colonial official H.M. Foot.

Heelas Ugokwe, a postal worker who in the midst of a countrywide crackdown on anti-colonial activists, carried out an assassination attempt on Colonial Chief Secretary, Hugh Foot. He stabbed him with a jack-knife from behind but Foot was rescued by a messenger. In court, Ugokwe revealed that his target was the British Governor, but because he could not reach him, he decided to assassinate Foot. He accused the British of carrying out massacres of Nigerians and that if the British officials who murdered Nigerian coal miners were free, he saw no reason why he should not be set free. His only regret, he told Justice S.B. Rhodes, was that he did not succeed in assassinating Foot. The judge gave Ugokwe the maximum life

Nnamdi Azikiwe, a political activist who would later serve as the president of Nigeria, is quoted as asking in response to the judgement:

In which law book did Mr. S. B. Rhodes read that a type of Ugokwe's charge was punished by life?

The judgment infuriated Dr. Azikiwe and his fellow Zikists, who had come to regard Heelas as a champion for Nigeria's liberation.

=== Executive Council ===
On 23 September 1942, King George VI gave directions for the appointment of Steven Bankole Rhodes, Esq. as a member of the Executive Council of Nigeria.

Before World War II, the educated elements - with a few exceptions - were excluded, not only from the central government, but also from the native administration of the country.

The total exclusion of Nigerians from this policy-making body was one of the sharpest criticisms that the Nigerian political leaders leveled against the Legislative and Executive system of colonial administration in the period between the two world wars.

As a result, three individuals were elected from the township of Lagos and one from Calabar by an electorate composed of the wealthier members of the communities . All the elected and appointed African members came from the educated class (five clergy men, six lawyers, one journalist, one wealthy trader, and one district chief from the Cameroons) yet only two of them - both elected from Lagos - would have been considered nationalists at the time they served, and they were all repudiated by the postwar nationalists. Two educated Africans (Sir Adeyemo Alakija and Justice S.B. Rhodes) were appointed to the governor's executive council in 1943, but both were considered by the colonists to be ‘safe’ government men. Before 1943, no African had participated directly in policy formulation at the central executive level.

Bourdillon agitated for constitutional reform to allow him seek African advice on the executive council, and insisted that it was his right as governor to seek the advice which he needed to govern effectively. On 1 September 1942, Lord Cranborne gave in, despite the unhappiness of his officials. Shortly afterwards, Sir Adeyemo Alakija and Justice S.B. Rhodes were appointed to the Executive Council, shortly followed by G.H. Avezathe and the Emir of Katsina.

Many Nigerians tended to belittle this inclusion of two of their countrymen in the Executive Council; Sir Bernard Bourdillon was obliged to remark in 1944:

“The importance of the step …received insufficient notice locally, chiefly because those Africans appointed were not of the same political colour as the press, but it was a real step forward, unofficial Africans now for the first time being in the inner Councils of the Governor.”

It was later said of these newly appointed leaders,

S. B. Rhodes and A. Alakija of Nigeria, and others, excelled with brilliance of speech and of pen. One cannot get a clearer picture of the type of men to whom the task of political leadership was entrusted, nor appreciate the esteem in which these men were held.

== Honours ==
On 1 January 1943, King George VI conferred the honour of Commander of the Most Excellent Order of the British Empire on Steven Bankole Rhodes, Esq. for public service in Nigeria.

== Religion ==
Justice S. B. Rhodes was the Chancellor of the Diocese on the Niger, Anglican Communion. At the time, the diocese covered Eastern Nigeria, the Mid-West, Kwara and the Middle Belt. He was succeeded by Sir Louis Mbanefo.

== Family ==
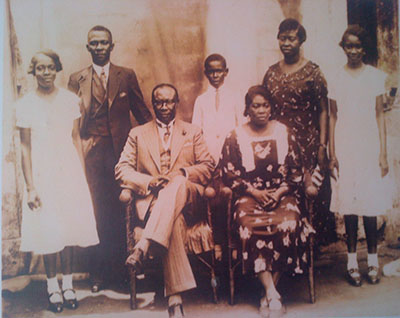
L-R; Gloria Rhodes, Justice R.W.A. Rhodes-Vivour, Justice S.B. Rhodes, Steve Rhodes, Mabel Rhodes, Joko Koffi, Olga Rhodes.

Justice S.B. Rhodes was married to Mabel Jones. They had a son, S.B Rhodes III, and two daughters - Gloria and Olga Rhodes. He is uncle to Justice R.W.A Rhodes-Vivour and granduncle to Supreme Court Justice Bode Rhodes-Vivour. He is also the great-granduncle of the politician Gbadebo Rhodes-Vivour.

== Death ==
A prominent member of colonial Lagos society, Justice S.B. Rhodes told Tony Enahoro, at the end of May 1947, that he expected no self-rule in his lifetime. True to his word, he died as the country's preparation for independence was apace.

Justice S.B. Rhodes C.B.E died in November, 1951, at the age of 61 years old.
