= Yahaya Bello =

Nigerian politician (born 1975)

His Excellency Yahaya Bello CON
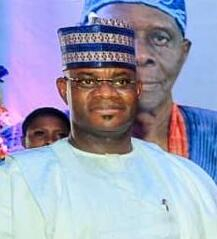

Governor of Kogi State
- In office 27 January 2016 – 27 January 2024
- Deputy: Simon Achuba (2016–2019); Edward Onoja (2019–2024)
- Preceded by: Idris Wada
- Succeeded by: Usman Ododo

Personal details
- Born: Yahaya Adoza Bello; 18 June 1975 (age 51) Okene, Kwara State (now in Kogi State), Nigeria
- Party: All Progressives Congress
- Spouses: Rashida Bello; Amina Oyiza Bello; Hafisat Bello; Hiqma Bello
- Education: MBA
- Alma mater: Ahmadu Bello University
- Occupation: Politician; accountant; businessman

Yahaya Adoza Bello CON (//; born 18 June 1975) is a Nigerian businessman, politician. He served as the governor of Kogi State from 2016 to 2024. A member of the All Progressives Congress, Bello was the youngest governor in Nigeria throughout his term in office.

Born in Okene, Bello studied accounting and business administration at Ahmadu Bello University before entering the workforce in the mid-2000s. His political career began with a loss to Abubakar Audu in the APC gubernatorial primary in 2015. Audu won the election, but died on election day; Bello was selected to replace him as party nominee, and was sworn in the following year. Four years later, Bello was elected amid reports of violence and fraud. His profile rose during his term due to his relative youth compared to other Nigerian politicians and his controversial statements and questionable expenditures.

== Early life and education ==
Bello was born on 18 June 1975 in Okene, Kogi State, the youngest of six children. He began attending Local Government Education Authority (Nigeria) (LGEA) Primary School, Agassa in Okene LGA in 1984. Bello was named the class-two prefect, and was made the school's head boy in class six. He attended high school at Agassa Community Secondary School, Anyava, Agassa-Okene, and obtained his Junior Secondary School Certificate Examination (JSSCE) and Senior Secondary Certificate Examination (SSCE) certificates from Government Secondary School in Suleja, Niger State, in 1994. Bello studied at Kaduna State Polytechnic Zaria in 1995, and received an accounting degree from Ahmadu Bello University in Zaria in 1999. He received a Master of Business Administration degree from the university in 2002. Bello became a chartered fellow of the Association of National Accountants of Nigeria in 2004. He enjoys sport and fitness, especially boxing.

== Political career ==
Bello was declared winner of the 2015 Kogi gubernatorial election after he was chosen by the All Progressives Congress to replace Abubakar Audu, who won the election but died before the result was declared. On 16 November 2019, he was elected to a second term after defeating PDP nominee Musa Wada by over 200,000 votes. Bello is the youngest governor in Nigeria, and the only governor born after the Nigerian Civil War. Victory Obasi announced in 2020 that she would fund Bello's run in the 2023 presidential elections. In Abuja on 2 April 2022, Bello declared his interest in running in Nigeria's 2023 presidential elections. He was supported by the Bello Ambassadors Network, a social-political group founded by Edogbo Anthony which had over two million registered Nigerian members. In December 2025, while on a visit to the palace of the Ohinoyi of Ebiraland, he announced his intention to contest the Kogi Central Senatorial seat in the 2027 general elections. “I accept to run for the Senate in 2027,” the former governor said while addressing the gathering.

== Controversies ==
=== Electoral fraud, incitements to violence, and US visa ban ===
On 14 September 2020, Bello was among a list of politicians placed on a visa ban by the United States Department of State for undermining democracy in Nigeria. Although activists praised the decision and called on other developed nations to impose similar bans, Bello accused the United States of partisanship and claimed the 2019 Kogi State gubernatorial election was mainly peaceful and fair. The election had significant reports of violence and fraud, along with claims that Bello incited the violence with a "ta-ta-ta-ta" chant that imitated the sound of gunfire.

In 2020, Bello repeated the "ta-ta-ta-ta" gunfire chant in Akure, Ondo State while addressing a rally for Rotimi Akeredolu's re-election campaign. The chant was condemned by the PDP, which accused Bello of organizing thugs to intimidate Ondo voters. Bello denied the claim, accusing the PDP of spreading misinformation.

=== COVID-19 denial and opposition to vaccines ===
During the COVID-19 pandemic, Bello falsely claimed that the virus was "an artificial creation" or denied the virus' existence while his state government suppressed testing and fought with the NCDC to keep case numbers low. Bello refused to wear a mask at public events, including after a governors' meeting with President Muhammadu Buhari and at the funeral for Tolulope Arotile. At memorial prayers for Kogi State Chief Judge Nasir Ajanah, who died of COVID-19 on 28 June 2020, Bello falsely claimed that Ajanah had not died of COVID-19 and said: "Whether medical experts and scientists, believe it or not, COVID-19 is out to shorten the lifestyle of the people, it is a disease propagated by force for Nigerians to accept".

In October 2020, Bello said that he had rejected a ₦1.1 billion support fund for Kogi State from the World Bank because of his belief that COVID-19 is a "glorified malaria". He said, "I rejected the World Bank fund because I do not believe in COVID-19. Even the five cases reported in Kogi State is an NCDC creation". This claim contradicted his admission that Kogi State had received ₦1 billion from the Federal Government for COVID-19 recovery.

In his 2020 New Year's Eve address, Bello dismissed the rising second wave of COVID in Nigeria: "We remain determined as a government not to respond to the highly controversial second wave with mass hysteria", and claimed that Kogi was "coronavirus-free". Bello opposes vaccinations, contrary to the scientific consensus that vaccines are safe and effective. During the rollout of COVID-19 vaccinations, he falsely claimed that vaccine makers "want to ... introduce the disease that will kill you, God forbid" and refused to receive the COVID-19 vaccine. These comments were publicised as an example of purposeful misinformation about vaccines and led to widespread condemnation, including by the Nigeria Governors' Forum.

=== Fake honorary professorship ===
According to Kogi State Commissioner for Information Kingsley Fanwo in April 2021, Bello received an honorary professorship in "humanitarian services, human resources management, Peace Building" from St Thomas-a-Becket University. Investigation by Sahara Reporters discovered that St Thomas-a-Becket University neither awards recognised UK degrees nor has courses in humanitarian services, human resources management, or peace-building.

=== Corruption allegations ===
==== Security fund and office renovation ====
In his first few days as governor, Bello approved the spending of ₦260 million in security funds in several installments. On his first day (27 January 2016), Permanent Secretary in the Government House Ilemona John requested permission to spend ₦15 million in security funds, and Bello approved it two days later. John requested approval for another ₦20 million in security funds on 2 February, which Bello approved that day. John asked for ₦5 million the following day, since the security fund "ha[d] just been exhausted", and Bello again approved it that day. Later on 3 February, John asked for ₦20 million to "replenish" the fund; Bello approved it immediately. On 8 February, John requested ₦100 million twice; Bello immediately approved the spending.

Bello also approved over ₦148 million to furnish and renovate his office at Government House. John requested approval for ₦99,983,994 for the renovation on 1 February 2016, and Bello immediately approved the spending. On 4 March, John asked for ₦48,593,250 to be paid "for an additional work on the renovation/furnishing and maintenance of the governor’s office at Kogi Government House". Bello's administration awarded Maj Global Construction Company a ₦1.4 billion contract for the "Remodelling and Rehabilitation of Government House Structures"; in 2020, company managing director Michel Abboud said that the Bello administration had not paid ₦726 million despite completion of the job.

Kogi State Commissioner for Information Kingsley Fanwo said that the large, rapid spending was necessary due to insecurity in Kogi State; the large renovation costs were required to make Government House habitable. Fanwo later said, "the Governor Yahaya Bello administration is contractually committed to fighting corruption and enthroning transparency in the polity". In 2020, Fanwo denied that Kogi State owed Maj Global Construction Company any more than ₦100 million.

==== Budget allocations ====
Soon after entering office in 2016, Bello and his administration were accused of corruption by the social-political groups Kogi in Action and Egalitarian Mission for Africa. The groups said that they sent information to the EFCC about alleged "fictitious withdrawals and evidence of contracts inflation" by the Bello administration that year. Kogi in Action spokesperson Majeed Abdullahi said that "EMA furnished the EFCC with details of executive recklessness on the part of the governor and his agents", expressing concern about the agency's alleged inaction.

In February 2021, scrutiny of the year's Kogi State budget uncovered scores of mentions of COVID-19, a virus Bello falsely claimed did not exist and refused to combat with countermeasures. The budget allocated billions of naira to COVID-19 countermeasures such as "E-health COVID-19 response" and "e-learning programme (COVID-19 palliative for students in JSS 3 and SSS 3)", in addition to ₦9.7 billion simply allocated to "COVID-19". Fanwo did not return requests for comment on the budget anomalies, and Bello's administration was accused of corruption with the "COVID-19" allocations. A total of at least ₦16.8 billion was allocated for COVID-19 countermeasures. A later investigation by Premium Times indicated that over ₦2.6 billion was allocated for agriculture-related COVID mitigation programs, but farmers interviewed said that no assistance was offered to them by the state government. Babaniyi Asorose, a farmer and Lokoja coordinator of the All Farmers Association of Nigeria, said that Lokoja seed and fertiliser distribution was discontinued the day after federal Minister of Agriculture Sabo Nanono opened the Kogi State distribution scheme; the warehouse was emptied of all supplies during the End SARS protests. Asorose and other farmers denied receiving state-government support and said that many of the supplies distributed were given to "political farmers" without farms. When presented with a freedom-of-information request, Commissioner for Agriculture David Apeh said that no government assistance was given to farmers because none of the budgeted money had been spent. Told by a reporter that the audited report indicated that the money had been spent, Apeh said that "it was not from my own office". Commissioner for Finance Asiru Idris (who signed the report) and Bello's chief press secretary, Onogwu Mohammed, did not respond to requests for comment.

Later in February 2021, the Anti-Corruption Network (a Kogi-based group that had accused Bello of corruption several times) released a report accusing Bello of laundering billions of naira in public funds; the organization then filed an Economic and Financial Crimes Commission (EFCC) petition against the governor on 1 March. According to former Peoples Democratic Party senator Dino Melaye, the petition was also submitted to the Independent Corrupt Practices Commission, the United States embassy, the British High Commission, and Transparency International. The report detailed alleged corruption in 2016, 2017, 2018, and 2019 Kogi State government expenditures, including (but not limited to) awarding state contracts inappropriately, irregularities and conflicts of interest in awarding contracts, awarding contracts without due process, and money laundering. The report sparked fresh calls for an EFCC investigation of Bello by Kogi anti-corruption groups and the PDP. The Bello administration called the allegations politically motivated and said that the PDP was fearful of Bello's rising profile. On 30 March, the EFCC announced an investigation of the Anti-Corruption Network's fraud allegation. In July of that year, the Anti-Corruption Network said that the EFCC had not made progress on its announced investigation of Bello and threatened to take legal action if the commission did not act promptly.

==== COVID-19 tracking software ====
On 26 March 2021, Premium Times reported that the Kogi State government had spent over ₦90 million on COVID-tracking software that only cost ₦300,000. Despite the Bello administration's lack of anti-COVID measures, financial records indicated that the state government bought a year of COVID-19 risk-assessment software for ₦90,720,000 in March 2020. A reporter posing as a government official who wanted to create a similar app in a different state contacted Telnet Technology, the company awarded the Kogi project, who said that a similar project would cost only ₦300,000 for one year. Fanwo said that the project cost less than a million naira, but refused to explain why the state financial report said that over ₦90 million was paid. The Premium Times reporting sparked further calls for investigation, with the Socio-Economic Rights and Accountability Project (SERAP) asking President Buhari to "direct the Attorney General of the Federation and Minister of Justice Abubakar Malami, SAN and appropriate anti-corruption agencies to investigate alleged misuse of the N4.5 billion donations, loans and support the Kogi State government obtained from the Federal Government, including N90,720,000 reportedly spent on software to track COVID-19 cases in the state."

==== Kogi State Salary Bailout account ====
On 31 August 2021, the Lagos Division of the Federal High Court froze the Kogi State Salary Bailout Sterling Bank fixed account after an application from the EFCC. The commission's affidavit said that it had "credible and direct intelligence" that the account was illegally funded with ₦20 billion from a state government loan account on 25 July 2019, and had not been used to pay civil-servant salaries. According to the EFCC, ₦666,666,666.64 was removed from the account in the two years between its creation and the court date; the commission said that it was attempting to trace the funds, since they were "not used for the payment of the salary". Judge Tijjani Ringim, who granted the commission's motion to freeze the account, said that the freeze would remain in place until 1 December pending the EFCC investigation and possible prosecution.

Sterling Bank responded that Kogi State had no fixed account in their bank, and the account mentioned by the EFCC is an internal number that the bank uses to manage Kogi State accounts; the bank said that there was a similarly numbered fixed account that Sterling did not operate. The Bello administration organized a press conference where Fanwo said that the state government had no fixed accounts in Sterling Bank, and the three state-government accounts in Sterling contained only ₦46 million. Fanwo accused the EFCC of misleading the judiciary and the public, threatening to sue the commission and the media for reporting the court proceedings. Bello denied the allegations, calling the case a "misrepresentation of facts", saying that no Kogi state account was frozen, and "the officials of the EFCC" could have misled the commission. The EFCC told the Kogi State government to go to court if it contested their findings. Human-rights activist Deji Adeyanju said that Bello "should be in jail forever" because of corruption, but all three Kogi State senators (Smart Adeyemi, Jibrin Isah and Yakubu Oseni, all APC members) met with EFCC chair Abdulrasheed Bawa in September 2021 to advocate for Bello. Bawa rebuffed the senators' case after explaining why the EFCC is not solely targeting Kogi, and analysts said that the case could be his biggest test since his February 2021 appointment.

In November 2021, the Central Bank of Nigeria acknowledged the receipt of about ₦19.3 billion in Kogi State salary bailout funds after their recovery by the EFCC. Fanwo again denied that the money belonged to the Kogi State government, calling the EFCC's report "mischievous, false and politically motivated". On 12 December, the state government sued the EFCC for ₦35 billion in damages for the commission's statements on the issue.

== Yahaya Bello vs EFCC ==
Former Kogi State Governor Yahaya Bello is facing a 19-count charge by the Economic and Financial Crimes Commission (EFCC) for alleged money laundering and misappropriation of ₦80.2 billion. Despite attempts to arrest him in April and September 2024, Bello evaded capture with the alleged assistance of Governor Usman Ododo, using his immunity as a sitting governor. Bello has since appealed to the Supreme Court, seeking to overturn a warrant for his arrest issued in April. His case has been adjourned until October 30, 2024.

== Awards and recognition ==
- Torchbearer of Security Award
- Daily Sun governor of the year award
- Gender equality award (National Council of Women's Societies)
- NUJ role model award
- Icon on Security award (Association of Nigerians in Diaspora)
- Security Personality of the Year (Institute of Security and Strategic Studies)
- Hero of Women Inclusion award (National Association of Women Entrepreneurs)
- ICAN Novel Accountability Index Award (Institute of Chartered Accountants of Nigeria)
- Presidential Award for Security Management

== See also ==
- List of governors of Kogi State
