= Yomi Awoniyi =

Nigerian politician and architect (born 1960)

Deputy Governor of Kogi State
- In office 27 January 2012 – 27 January 2016
- Governor: Idris Wada
- Preceded by: Philip Salawu
- Succeeded by: Simon Achuba

Personal details
- Born: Abayomi Sunday Benjamin Awoniyi; 4 September 1960 (age 66) Lagos, British Nigeria
- Party: All Progressives Congress (since 2023)
- Other political affiliations: Peoples Democratic Party (before 2023)
- Parent: Sunday Awoniyi
- Education: Barewa College; Ahmadu Bello University; University College, London
- Occupation: Politician; architect

Abayomi Sunday Benjamin Awoniyi(born 4 September 1960) is a Nigerian architect and politician who served as the deputy governor of Kogi State from 2012 to 2016.
