= Omoyele Sowore treason charges =

Sowore Criminal charges

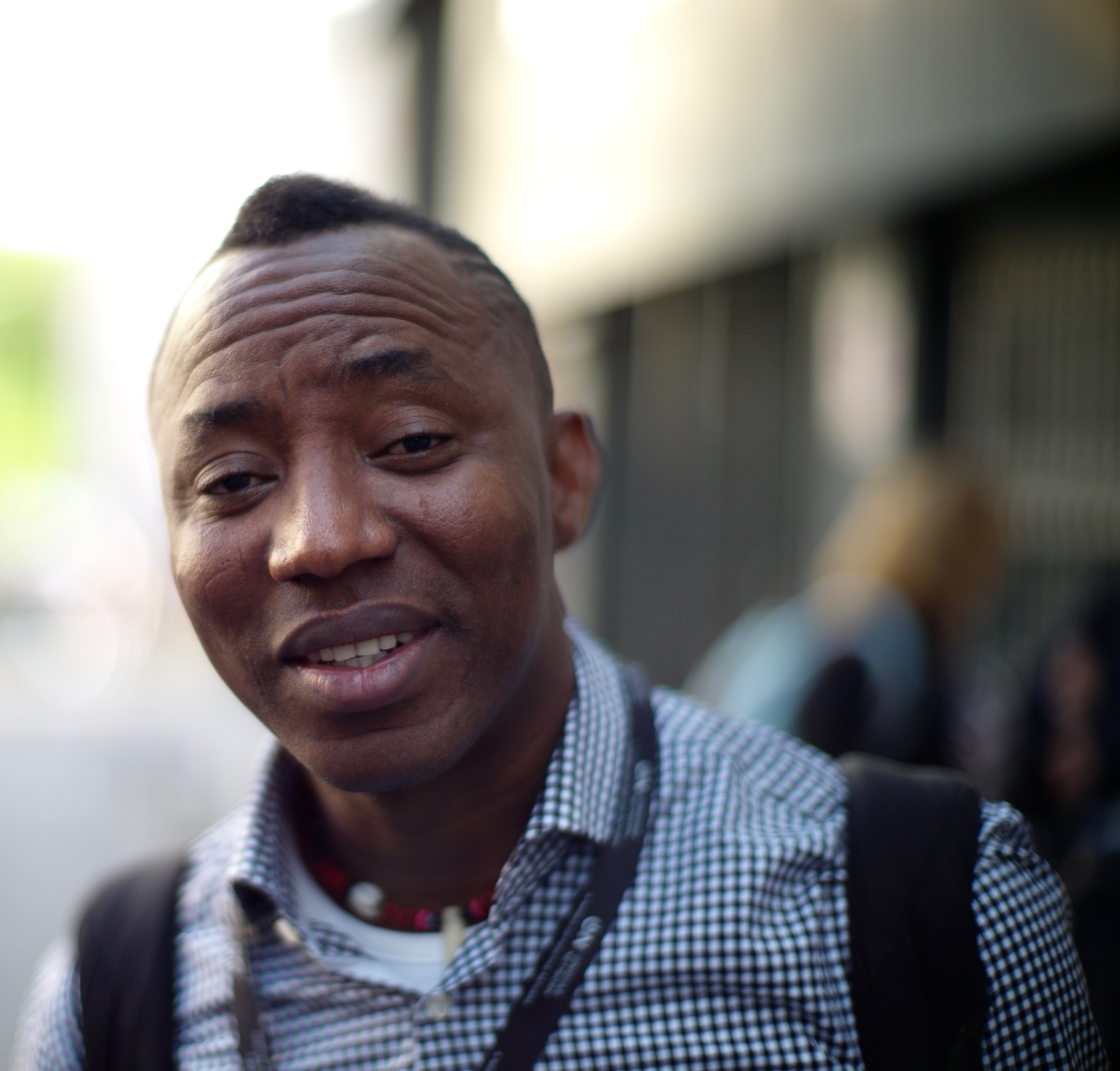
Sowore in 2016

Omoyele Sowore, a presidential candidate in the 2019 Nigerian general election, was arrested by the Department of State Services (DSS) on August 3, 2019, in Lagos, Nigeria, after he called for nation-wide protests as part of the #RevolutionNow movement he started.

== Background ==
The Coalition for Revolution (CORE), a political movement led by Sowore called for a nation-wide protest march themed Revolution Now, to commence from August 5, 2019. In July, 2019, CORE issued its 5-core demands for Revolution Now, being:

1. An economy that works for the masses.
2. An effective and democratic end to insecurity.
3. An end to systemic corruption and for total system change.
4. The immediate implementation of the NGN30,000 minimum wage.
5. Free and quality education for all.

== Revolution Now ==
In July 2019, Sowore via his micro-blogging handle announced the hashtag #RevolutionNow while communicating the commencement date via a graphic post. This was to press the 5-point demands of CORE and garner widespread attention.

== Arrest ==
Nigeria's Department of State Services (DSS) arrested Sowore at his Lagos residence on August 3, 2019, by 1.25 am. His online news platform Sahara Reporters first broke the story before other local news platforms followed suit. A DSS petition to keep Sowore in custody for 45 days pending investigations was granted on August 8 by an Abuja court, headed by Justice Taiwo Taiwo.

== Trial ==
Sowore was charged to court for treasonable and money laundering felonies after being in detention for 45 days. The breakdown of the Nigeria State charges against him were:

1. conspiracy to commit treasonable felony by allegedly staging a revolution campaign aimed at removing the President and Commander-in-Chief of the Armed Forces of the Federal Republic of Nigeria
2. committing the actual offence of reasonable felony in August 2019 in Abuja, Lagos and other parts of Nigeria, to stage the #RevolutionNow protest allegedly aimed at removing the President.
3. cybercrime offences by granting press interview for the purpose of causing insult, enmity, hatred and ill-will on the person of the President of the Federal Republic of Nigeria
4. money laundering offences by alleged transferring $74,400 in 4 installments by means of swift wire

=== Timeline of Sowore's trial ===
- August 3: Sowore was arrested in Lagos, Nigeria.
- August 8: An Abuja court granted the DSS plea to keep Sowore in custody for 45 days to conclude their investigation.
- September 20: Nigerian government files charges against Sowore for terrorism, cybercrime and harassing the president.
- September 24: The same Abuja court grants Sowore bail and orders his release.
- September 26: DSS disobeyed court order citing non receipt of the court order; Sowore's lawyers filed a notice of contempt of court against the DSS.
- September 30: Sowore re-arraigned in court, pleads not guilty to all charges.
- October 4: Sowore is granted bail, by Justice Ijeoma Ojukwu of an Abuja court, conditions were: the sum of 100 million Nigerian Naira; submission of international passport; and an indefinite press gag.
- November 6: Justice Ijeoma Ojukwu issued the release order to the DSS. Fixed February 11, 2020 as next adjourned date for the trial.
- December 4: Sowore granted bail after meeting new bail conditions.
- December 6: Sowore was violently rearrested at an Abuja Court by the DSS.
- December 17: Justice Inyang Ekwo fixed December 23 for hearing date from The DSS and AGF to argue why Sowore should not be released.
- December 23: Case was reassigned to be heard by Justice Ahmed Mohammed. The Honorable Justice recused himself due to a publication of bribery allegation against him by Sahara Reporters owned by Mr Sowore. Abubakar Malami (SAN), the AGF and Minister of Justice, announced his take over of the prosecution of Sowore in the charge of treasonable felony levied against him.

=== Federal government fined ===
For frequent calls for adjournment of the case against Sowore, a Federal High Court in Abuja fined the Federal Government the sum of NGN 200,000. The Federal Government confirmed the fine's payment at a resumed hearing.

== International protests ==
On August 23, 48 press freedom advocates petitioned the United Nations (UN) and the African Commission on Human and Peoples’ Rights, to urgently intervene by securing Sowere's immediate release. They also described Sowore's arrest as a gross violation of his human rights and a threat to press freedom in Nigeria, and by September 26, resent an update to their appeal for intervention. Also in September, another group of 72 writers, academics and activists, which includes Edmund Phelps, Anya Schiffrin, Sheila Coronel, Okey Ndibe and Bruce Shapiro sent an open letter to demand that Nigeria drop charges against Omoyele Sowore. Ope Sowore, his wife led a group of protesters to the UN Plaza building where President Buhari was in attendance and also led supporters to stage a rally outside the office of U.S. senator Bob Menedez to demand her husband's release.

== Release ==
Omoyele Sowore's was finally released on December 24, 2019, on bail. His release came to be after the Nigeria's Attorney-General of the Federation (AGF) and Minister of Justice, Mr. Abubakar Malami (SAN), said in a statement on Tuesday that he had issued a directive to the DSS to release him and others. This was after the Attorney General took over the prosecution of all charges against Sowore from the DSS after issuing a letter to intent on December 11, 2019, to the Director General of the DSS directing them to forward all the case files to the AGF's office. In the same vein, Sowore's legal team called for a total withdraw of charges pending any other criminal charges against his client, insisting that there was no evidence to get the ‘Revolution Now’ protests convener convicted on present charges.

== Legal team ==
Senior lawyers (>25 years of practice)

- Femi Falana (SAN)
- Olumide Fusika (SAN)
- Abdul Mahmud

Junior lawyers

- Inibehe Effiong
- Abubakar Marshall
- Abubakar Yesufu
- Tijani Yusuf
- Oyeghe Seprebo
- Martins Sowore
- Mbasekei Obono
