= Opeyemi =

- Gender: Unisex
- Language: Yoruba

Origin
- Origin: Yoruba
- Meaning: I should be grateful
- Region of origin: Southwest of Nigeria

Other names
- Variant forms: Ope, Yemi

Opeyemi is a given name and surname of Yoruba origin. It meaning is "I should be grateful," "I am meant to be grateful" or "Thanksgiving suits me."

== People ==
Given name

- Opeyemi Oke (born 1954), Nigerian jurist and current chief judge of Lagos State
- Opeyemi Fagbohungbe, Ghanaian actor with a role in Beasts of No Nation
- Opeyemi Sowore, Nigerian American businesswoman and wife of Omoyele Sowore

Middle name

- Michael Opeyemi Bamidele (born 1963) Nigerian lawyer and politician

Surname

- Tijani Luqman Opeyemi (born 1990), Nigerian football player
