= Mukadam Asiwaju Asiru Idris =

Nigerian diplomat

Commissioner of Finance
- Incumbent
- Assumed office 2016

Commissioner of Budget and Economic Planning
- Incumbent
- Assumed office January 2020

Special Adviser on Finance Economy, Commerce and Investment to the Governor of Kogi State
- In office January 2016 – November 2019

Personal details
- Born: December 22, 1975 (age 50) Isanlu, Yagba East LGA
- Parent(s): Asiru Ijagbemi (father); Hajia Hawawu Ijagbemi (mother)
- Education: Ahmadu Bello University; Kogi State University

Mukadam Asiwaju Asiru Idris FCA is a Nigerian government official and diplomat serving as the Kogi state's Commissioner of Finance since 2016. He previously served as the Special Adviser on Finance Economy, Commerce and Investment to the Governor of Kogi State from January 2016 to November 2019 under Governor Yahaya Bello. He was reappointed as Commissioner of Finance, Budget and Economic Planning in January 2020 a position he held till date.

== Early life and education ==
Mukadam Asiwaju Asiru Idris was born on December 22, 1975, in Isanlu, Yagba East LGA, to Asiru Ijagbemi, a farmer and Hajia Hawawu Ijagbemi, a trader, and the iyaoloja of Bagido in Isanlu.

He obtained Nigeria Certificate in Education (NCE) in Economics/Mathematics from College of Education, Oro in Kwara State. He also attended Ahmadu Bello University, Zaria, He is a master's degree Holder of Accounting from the Kogi State University, Ayingba.

== Career ==
=== Early career ===
Mukadam Asiwaju Asiru Idris started as an Executive Assistant, Head teller in Zenith bank. In 2006, he became the Senior Executive Assistant, Vault Administration/Cash Officer with the same bank.

Asiwaju was promoted to Assistant Manager, Head Corporate Banking Group where he managed the bank's relationship with assigned companies with turnover in excess of $30million.

=== Civil career ===
The sterling performances of Mukadam Asiwaju Asiru Idris in Zenith Bank attracted him to the likes of Governor Yahaya Bello who appointed him as the Special Adviser on Finance and Economic Management in 2016. This gave him an ample opportunity to serve as an acting Commissioner of Finance and supervise the activities of the State’s Ministry of Finance

The Economic and Investment Management Team was established and saddled with the responsibility to interact and brainstorm with investors in other to attract investment to the State.

== Awards and honours ==
Overall Best 100 Level Accounting Student, Ahmadu Bello University, Zaria 1996

Overall Best 200 Level Accounting Student, Ahmadu Bello University, Zaria 1997

MD/CEO letter of commendation for Team Player, Zenith Bank Plc, 2002

MD/CEO award for the best operational efficiency cash officer in the North, Zenith Bank Plc, 2006.

Award for Financial Transparency by World Bank.
