= Ahmed Usman Ododo =

Nigerian politician (born 1982)

His Excellency Ahmed Usman Ododo

Governor of Kogi State
- Incumbent
- Assumed office 27 January 2024
- Deputy: Salifu Joel
- Preceded by: Yahaya Bello

Personal details
- Born: 1 January 1978 (age 48) Okene, Kogi State, Nigeria
- Party: All Progressives Congress
- Education: Ahmadu Bello University; University of Lagos
- Occupation: Politician; accountant

Ahmed Usman Ododo (born 1 January 1978) is a Nigerian accountant and politician who has served as governor of Kogi State since 2024. He is a member of the All Progressives Congress (APC).

Before his election as governor of Kogi State, he served as the auditor-general for local governments in Kogi State, overseeing the financial audits of local government councils in the state.

== Education and early career ==
Ododo studied accountancy at the Federal Polytechnic Bida, Niger State, before earning a bachelor's degree in accounting from Ahmadu Bello University, Zaria. He later obtained a Doctor of Philosophy (PhD) from the University of Lagos. He was appointed auditor-general for local governments by Governor Yahaya Bello.
