= Steve Rhodes (musician) =

Nigerian broadcaster and musician

Steven Bankole Rhodes III (April 1926 - May 2008), known professionally as Steve Rhodes, was a Nigerian broadcaster and musician who founded the Steve Rhodes Orchestra in 1970. He was Fela Kuti's manager in the 1960s and was source of inspiration for many Nigerian musicians who started out in the 1960s and 1970s.

== Life ==
Rhodes was born to the family of Bankole Rhodes, a Nigerian judge that served as a founding father of his country, and Mabel Jones de Rhodes. His interest in music began at a young age; at the age of seven he was getting piano lessons from Sir Kofo Abayomi and then was a choir boy in the Christ Church Cathedral choir under T.K.E. Philips. Rhodes attended a few secondary schools, including CMS Grammar School, Dennis Memorial School, Onithsa and Enitonna High School in Port Harcout. He then enrolled at Oxford for + politics and economics program. While at Oxford, he met a German music teacher who promised to give him lessons if he moved to Germany. Rhodes obliged and moved to Germany, where he was taught music history, conducting and orchestration. To survive, he played in quartets, jazz clubs and worked with the British Forces Broadcasting Service.

In 1956, he returned to Nigeria and started work with the Nigerian Broadcasting Corporation. At NBC, he organized a radio orchestra called NBC Dance Orchestra, a big band that also had dance music in its repertoire. He left NBC in 1958. In 1961, he took up appointment with the Western Nigerian Television service as a programme director. He left WNTV and set up Rhodes Sound Vision, a music and visual production company, which managed and produced artists, the best known of who was Fela Anikulapo-Kuti.

In 1971, he formed the choir The Voices, which later became the Steve Rhodes Voices. Ultimately, this choir later metamorphosed into the Steve Rhodes Orchestra. Rhodes originally started The Voices as a choral group in church. The vicar of the Christ Church Cathedral, Marina, had asked Rhodes to create a contemporary musical contribution to the church.
