= 1999 Kogi State gubernatorial election =

1999 gubernatorial election in Kogi State, Nigeria

- January 9, 1999
Nominee	Abubakar Audu
Party	All People's Party (Nigeria)	PDP
Popular vote	608,329	349,055
Governor before election
Abubakar Audu
NRC
Elected Governor
Abubakar Audu
All People's Party (Nigeria)

The 1999 Kogi State gubernatorial election occurred in Nigeria on January 9, 1999. The APP nominee Abubakar Audu won the election, defeating the PDP candidate.

Abubakar Audu emerged APP candidate.

== Electoral system ==
The Governor of Kogi State is elected using the plurality voting system.

== Primary election ==
=== APP primary ===
The APP primary election was won by Abubakar Audu.

== Results ==
The total number of registered voters in the state was 1,265,442. Total number of votes cast was 974,892 while number of valid votes was 961,206. Rejected votes were 13,686.

Candidate	Party	Votes	%
Abubakar Audu	All People's Party	608,329	63.54
People's Democratic Party	349,055	36.46	
Total		957,384	100.00
Valid votes		957,384	98.59
Invalid/blank votes		13,686	1.41
Total votes		971,070	100.00
Registered voters/turnout		1,265,442	76.74
Source: Nigeria World, IFES, Semantics Scholar
