= Edward Onoja =

Nigerian politician (born 1974)

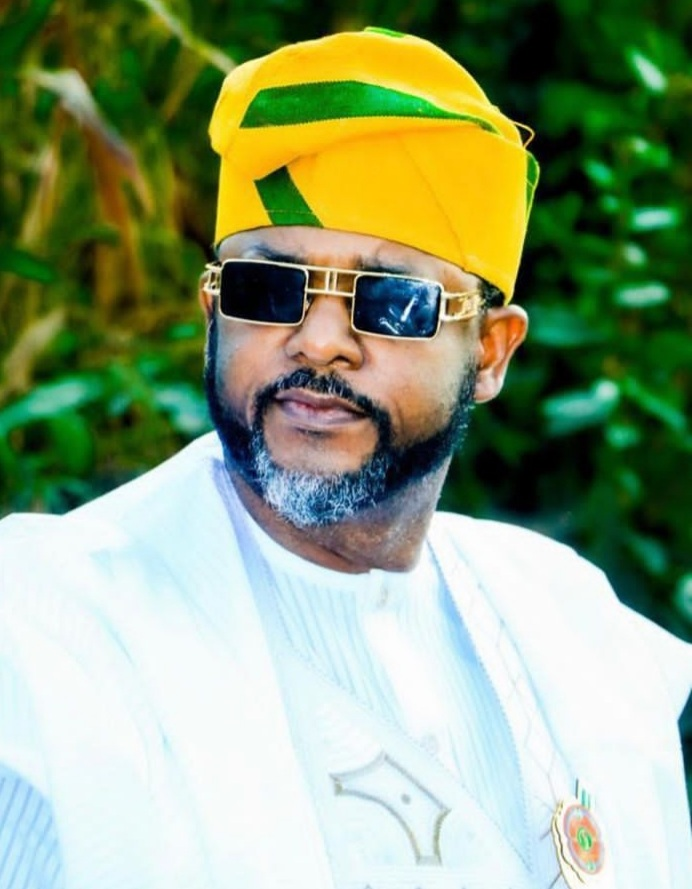

Board Member SEDC Representing North Central
- Incumbent
- Assumed office January 2025

Deputy Governor of Kogi State
- In office 21 October 2019 – 27 January 2024
- Governor: Yahaya Bello
- Preceded by: Simon Achuba
- Succeeded by: Salifu Joel

Chief of Staff to the Governor of Kogi State
- In office January 2016 – October 2019
- Governor: Yahaya Bello

Personal details
- Born: Edward David Onoja; 9 August 1974 (age 52) Olamaboro, Benue-Plateau State (now in Kogi State), Nigeria
- Party: All Progressives Congress
- Spouse: Ejura Onoja
- Children: 4
- Education: University of Jos
- Occupation: Politician; banker
- Website: edwarddavidonoja.com

Edward David Onoja (//; born 9 August 1974) is a Nigerian politician who served as the deputy governor of Kogi State from 2019 to 2024. He was chief of staff to the governor of Kogi State from January 2016 to October 2019 when he assumed office as deputy governor. He is currently serving as the pioneer member representing North Central on the board of South East Development Commission.

== Background ==
Edward David Onoja was born in August 1974. He hails from Odidoko-Emonyoku in Ogugu District of Olamaboro Local Government Area of Kogi State.

He had his Primary School Education in Lagos State and later proceeded to Federal Government College, Kwali, Abuja for his Secondary School Education. In 1999, He graduated from the University of Jos with a Second (Upper Division) in Geology and Mining and invariably was one of the top graduating students in his class. He was active in student unionism and politics and eventually became the first elected President of his Faculty's Association: Natural Science Students Association (NASSA) in University of Jos between 1998 -1999.

== Politics ==
His first venture into politics was in 2011 where he was the candidate of the All Nigeria Peoples Party (ANPP) in the Olamaboro State Constituency in the 2011 General Election. In 2015, he became the director general of the Kogi Youth Arise Group, chaired by Yahaya Bello, a political support group that championed the delivery of the victory of President Muhammadu Buhari in the 2015 General Election in Kogi State. Later that year, he became the chief strategist and director general in the Yahaya Bello, gubernatorial campaign. After the swearing of Governor Yahaya Bello in January 2016. He became the Chief of Staff to the Governor until October 2019 when he was elevated to the Deputy Governor after the impeachment of Simon Achuba. In the 16 November 2019 general election, he was elected as the Deputy Governor of Kogi State.

Onoja was also appointed the director-general, APC Campaigns for the 2019 General Elections in Kogi State. He discharged that assignment with unprecedented results. The APC won 25 out of the 25 state constituency assembly seats in Kogi State. The party also won seven out of the nine federal constituency seats in the state and two out of the three senate seats. Based on the recent ruling of the elections tribunals nullifying the only senate seat lost by the APC, Onoja made a clean sweep of all three senatorial seats in Kogi State.
