= Dele Farotimi =

Nigeria human rights lawyer

- Born: Oladele Farotimi; 27 April 1968 (age 58); Nigeria
- Education: Lagos State University
- Occupations: Activist; Lawyer; Author
- Years active: 1999–present
- Organization: (RAMINBA)
- Notable work: Nigeria and Its Criminal Justice System
- Political party: Labour Party (2019–present)
- Website: www.delefarotimi.com

Dele Farotimi ()(born 27 April 1968), is a Nigerian lawyer, author, and political activist known for his outspoken advocacy for justice, good governance, and systemic reforms in Nigeria. He has gained prominence for his writings, public speeches, and media appearances, critiquing Nigeria's political structure and societal challenges. Dele is a member of the Citizen's Rally Against Oppression (RAMINBA).

== Biography ==
Dele Farotimi was born on 27 April 1968 . He completed his secondary education at Fiditi Grammar School. He later earned a law degree from Lagos State University where he graduated with an LLB. He served as President of the Student's Union at the Lagos State University (LASU), in 1994–1995, and was called to the Nigerian bar in 1999.

Farotimi began his legal career at Adesina Ogunlana & Co, focusing on legal advocacy and human rights. Over the years, he became known for his work in promoting justice and social change in Nigeria. He practiced law actively until his retirement in 2018 at the age of 50. In addition to his legal career, Farotimi is a published author. His book, Do Not Die in Their War, explores issues such as corruption, governance, and the rule of law in Nigeria. The book has been noted for its critical perspective on systemic challenges in the country and has received attention for its analysis of Nigeria's political landscape.

== Controversy ==
Avatar of Inibehe Effiong

Inibehe Effiong
(@InibeheEffiong)
tweeted:

Can

@CorrectionsNg explain why they had to handcuff @DeleFarotimi while taking him to the Federal High Court in Ado Ekiti this morning for arraignment? This is preposterous. He did not pose any threat, and did not resist being taken to court.

Dele Farotimi is a political prisoner and will come out stronger.

9 December 2024

Dele Farotimi was arrested in lagos state on December 3, 2024, and extradited to Ekiti State by the Nigerian Police Force in connection with his book, Nigeria and Its Criminal Justice System. The arrest followed allegations of defamation brought against him by Senior Advocate of Nigeria (SAN) Afe Babalola. Farotimi's detention sparked widespread outrage, with activists, legal practitioners, and civil society organizations condemning the action as an attempt to stifle free speech and dissent. In response, his supporters organized protests with the hashtag #FreeDeleFarotimiNow led by Omoyele Sowore, launched social media campaigns, and initiated legal actions demanding his immediate release and urging the Nigerian Government to uphold democratic principles. Social media played a critical role in amplifying the #FreeDeleFarotimiNow campaign. The hashtag trended across platforms like Twitter, Instagram, and Facebook, as prominent figures in the Nigerian legal and entertainment industries joined the call for his release.

The protests began with physical demonstrations in major cities, including Lagos, Abuja, and Ado-Ekiti, where participants demanded Farotimi's immediate release and the dismissal of the charges against him. Protesters carried placards with messages such as "Justice for Dele" and "End the Silencing of Critics," while legal professionals organized symbolic marches in solidarity with their detained colleague.

On 10 December 2024, Farotimi was charged to court following his arrest on allegations of defamation. The case, filed by the Nigerian Police Force accused Farotimi of 16 counts of charges, criminal defamation, and cyberbullying. Farotimi, through his legal counsel, denied the allegations and maintained that his book was a fair critique of systemic issues within Nigeria's justice system. His defense team argued that the charges were an infringement on his constitutional right to free speech and an abuse of legal processes. Ekiti State granted Dele Farotimi bail in the sum of ₦50 million, following his arraignment on charges of defamation.

Nigeria and Its Criminal Justice System

Nigeria and Its Criminal Justice System gained significant attention following its release, with Amazon listing it as the number one bestseller worldwide in its category. The book's critical exploration of systemic issues in Nigeria's legal and judicial landscape resonated with readers across the globe, propelling it to the top of international bestseller charts. the book received a (4.00 out of 5) from the site which was based on five critic reviews.

The release of the book was accompanied by a public dispute between Dele Farotimi and Afe Babalola, In a controversial development a court in Nigeria issued an injunction halting the further production, distribution, and sale of Nigeria and Its Criminal Justice System. The decision came following a lawsuit filed by Babalola, who alleged that certain portions of the book contained defamatory statements and misrepresentations about individuals and institutions within the Nigerian criminal justice system.

== Assassination attempt ==
On February 24, 2021, Dele Farotimi petitioned the State Security Service (SSS) and the Lagos State Police Command over threats to assassinate him by top officials in the government, in what many believe was an effort to silence his outspoken criticism of systemic corruption and governance in Nigeria.

== Selected works ==
Dele Farotimi has authored several books, including:

- ——— (2021). Do Not Die in Their War (novel). ISBN 978-1-07-265932-7
- ——— (2024). Nigeria and Its Criminal Justice System (novel). ASIN B0D8L8KSJ8
