= Simon Achuba =

Nigerian politician

His Excellency Simon Achuba

Deputy Governor of Kogi State
- In office 9 February 2016 – 18 October 2019
- Governor: Yahaya Bello
- Preceded by: Edward Onoja

Personal details
- Born: 13 July 1964 (age 62)
- Party: All Progressives Congress
- Occupation: Politician

Simon Achuba born 13 July 1964 is a Nigerian politician who served as the deputy governor of Kogi State from 2016 to 2019. He was selected by Yahaya Bello as his running mate under the platform of the All progressive Congress in the 2016 Kogi State gubernatorial election.

== Early life and career ==
Simon Achuba was born on 13 July 1964, he is from Ibaji Local Government Area of Kogi state, Nigeria.

He was a member fo the Assembly between 1999 and 2007 and Deputy Speaker of the house between 2003 and 2007 as well as the immediate past chairman of the Kogi State Environmental Protection Board.

== Political Controversy ==
Simon Achuba was replacement for James Faleke to become Deputy to Governor Yahaya Bello as the former declined the offer. A rift between the Governor and Deputy, the Deputy alleged that his life was in danger, also accused the governor of unpaid salaries He added that his security detail was withdrawn without any cogent reason and appealed the Inspector General of Police (IGP) to wade into the matter

He was impeached by members of the Kogi State House of Assembly on Friday 18 October 2019 in Lokoja the state capital. His impeachment followed the submission of a report by seven man committee setup by the State Chief Judge, Justice Nasir Ajana; headed by John Bayeshea to investigate the gross misconduct of the deputy governor.

In a suit marked NICN/ABJ/244/2019 dated 19 August 2019, Achuba dragged the governor to court over impeachment, unpaid allownaces and entitlement at the National Industrial Court of Nigeria (NICN) In a judgement delivered by Justice John Olorunfemi, the court decleared the impeachment null and void; also ordered payment of outstanding allowances.
