= Bzigu Afakirya =

Nigerian officer

Bzigu Lassa Afakirya

Military Governor of Kogi State
- In office August 22, 1996 – August 1998
- Preceded by: Paul Omeruo
- Succeeded by: Augustine Aniebo

Military service
- Allegiance: Nigeria
- Branch: Nigerian Army
- Rank: Colonel

Colonel (retired) Bzigu Lassa Afakirya was the Military Administrator of Kogi State, Nigeria from August 1996 to August 1998 during the military regime of General Sani Abacha. When he assumed office he dissolved and reconstituted the Local Government Service Commission. Following the return to democracy, as a former military administrator he was required to retire from the army. In October 2005, he was awarded fellowship of the Kogi State Polytechnic.
