= Ify Aniebo =

Nigerian-British molecular genetics and infectious disease

- Born: Ifeyinwa Aniebo
- Education: Queen Mary University of London; University of Nottingham; University of Oxford; London School of Hygiene and Tropical Medicine; Harvard T.H. Chan School of Public Health
- Known for: Genomic surveillance and malaria research in Nigeria

Ifeyinwa "Ify" Aniebo is a British-Nigerian molecular geneticist, infectious disease researcher, and global health scholar. She has worked on integrating genomic surveillance into Nigeria's national malaria elimination strategy and has written on malaria, infectious diseases, and health policy in Africa.

== Background and education ==
Aniebo is the daughter of Brigadier-General Augustine Aniebo, who served as the Military Administrator of the Borno and Kogi States of Nigeria. She is married to Gbadebo Rhodes-Vivour, a Nigerian architect and politician.

She studied Genetics and Microbiology at Queen Mary University of London, followed by an MSc in Applied Biomolecular Technology at the University of Nottingham. She later completed a Master of Research in Public Health and an MPH at the University of Oxford. Aniebo received a PhD in Clinical Medicine and Infectious Diseases from the London School of Hygiene & Tropical Medicine, where her doctoral research focused on malaria drug resistance.

== Career and research ==
Aniebo's research focuses on malaria drug resistance and the use of genomic data for surveillance and public health planning. She has participated in large-scale studies, including nationwide sampling in Nigeria. She is an Associate Professor of Molecular Biology and Genomics at the Institute of Genomics and Global Health (IGH), formerly the African Centre of Excellence for Genomics of Infectious Diseases (ACEGID). She also serves as a panel member of the Future of Health and Economic Resiliency in Africa (FHERA) at Harvard University.

Her past roles include:

- HIV Research Associate at the Clinton Health Access Initiative
- Takemi Fellow in International Health at the Harvard T.H. Chan School of Public Health
- Senior Research Scientist at the Health Strategy and Delivery Foundation in Lagos, Nigeria

== Science communication advocacy ==
Aniebo is active in science communication and education. She founded AfroScientric, a social enterprise that supports African women in STEM careers. AfroScientric has collaborated with organizations such as Springer Nature to provide training for early career researchers in Africa.

She has also published opinion pieces and commentary on genetically modified organisms (GMOs), African research funding, decolonization of global health, and governance reforms in malaria control.

== Publications and awards ==
Aniebo has written in peer-reviewed journals and media outlets on malaria, global health, and African research systems.

Her awards and honors include:

- New Voices Fellow, Aspen Institute (2016)
- Young Person of the Year (2010), The Future Awards Africa
- Best Use of Science (2010), The Future Awards Africa
- Calestous Juma Fellowship, Bill and Melinda Gates Foundation
