= Salifu Joel =

Nigerian politician

His Excellency Salifu Joel

Deputy Governor of Kogi State
- Incumbent
- Assumed office 27 January 2024
- Governor: Usman Ododo
- Preceded by: Edward Onoja

Personal details
- Born: 7 May 1967 (age 59)
- Party: All Progressives Congress
- Occupation: Politician; teacher

Salifu Joel Oyibo (born 7 May 1967) is a Nigerian teacher and politician who has served as the deputy governor of Kogi State since 2024. He was selected by Ahmed Usman Ododo as his running mate under the platform of the All Progressive Congress in the 2023 Kogi State gubernatorial election.
