= Rashida Bello =

First Lady of Kogi state

Rashida Yahaya Bello
- Education: University of Abuja, Brightway Primary School, Brightway Secondary School
- Occupation: philanthropist
- Years active: 2016-2024
- Spouse: Yahaya Bello

Rashida Yahaya Bello was the First Lady of Kogi State, as spouse of governor Yahaya Bello.

== Early life and education ==
Bello grew up in Jattu in Etsako West local government area of Edo State. She attended Brightway Primary School and Brightway Secondary School and obtained West African Examinations Council. She graduated from the University of Abuja with a Bachelor of Science Degree in Accountancy.

Bello advocates for women's empowerment, children, and peace.

== Philanthropy ==
Bello launched The Kogi Women and Youth Advancement Foundation (KOWYAF), a non-governmental organization which aims to empower women and youth, encourage the growth of micro businesses for vulnerable women and youth and to drastically reduce the mother/child mortality rate in Kogi State.

== Controversy ==
In 2018, Amina Mohammed, aka Justina Oluoha and Amina Villa, was arrested by the Department of State Services (DSS) for reportedly impersonating Bello and the Nigerian former president's wife, Aisha Buhari. On Monday, 3 December 2018, in Abuja, DSS public relations officer Peter Afunanya revealed this while speaking to reporters about the arrest. He claimed that the suspect gained unlawful entrance to Aso Villa and utilised the national First Lady's office to commit fraud. Before being identified, the suspect used several names and identities to deceive unsuspecting people, according to Afunanya.

== See also ==
- List of first ladies of Nigerian states

Honorary titles
| Preceded by Hajiya Halima Wada Idris | First Lady of Kogi State; 2016-till date | Succeeded by Incumbent |
