= Danladi Mohammed Zakari =

Brigadier General Danladi Mohammed Zakari

Military Governor of Kogi State
- In office August 28, 1991 – January 1992
- Preceded by: Office established
- Succeeded by: Abubakar Audu

Military service
- Allegiance: Nigeria
- Branch/service: Nigerian Army
- Rank: Brigadier General

Danladi Mohammed Zakari // was the first Military Administrator of Kogi State, Nigeria after it was created in August 1991 from parts of Benue and Kwara states. He held office from August 1991 until January 1992 during the military regime of General Ibrahim Babangida, handing over to the elected governor Abubakar Audu at the start of the Nigerian Third Republic.

The new Kogi state inherited a share of both assets and liabilities of Benue and Kwara states. Zakari had to quickly establish the administrative structure from scratch, creating ministries of Justice, Works, Health, Agriculture, Education and Finance, and agencies such as the Local Government Services commission, the Judiciary and the Muslim Pilgrims Welfare Board. He also set up a committee chaired by the Ohinoyi of Ebiraland to create a blueprint for economic development of the state. Little was done to realize this plan by his successors. On 16 December 1991, he established the Kogi Agricultural Development Project, a continuation of programs from Benue and Kwara states. The program was to provide assistance to farmers in the form of input subsidies and infrastructure development.
