= Amina Oyiza Bello =

Nigerian lawyer and philanthropist

- Born: 2 April 1978 (age 48); Eika-Ohizenyi, Okehi LGA, Kogi State
- Education: University of Leicester; Obafemi Awolowo University
- Spouse: Yahaya Bello

Amina Oyiza Bello, née Yakubu (born 2 April 1978) is a lawyer, philanthropist, and the first wife of Yahaya Bello, Kogi state governor. She is the CEO of Fairplus International ltd, founder of Hayat Foundation, businesswoman, and a humanitarian.

She is the second of eight siblings.

Amina attended Obafemi Awolowo University in Nigeria, where she studied Law and received her LLB degree.
