= Paul Omeruo =

Paul Uzoanya N. Omeruo

Military Governor of Kogi State
- In office 9 December 1993 – 22 August 1996
- Preceded by: Abubakar Audu
- Succeeded by: Bzigu Afakirya

Military service
- Allegiance: Nigeria
- Branch: Nigerian Army
- Rank: Colonel

Colonel (retired) Paul Uzoanya N. Omeruo was the Military Administrator of Kogi State, Nigeria from December 1993 to August 1996 during the military regime of General Sani Abacha.

Omeruo dealt unsuccessfully with major challenges, and was subject to considerable criticism during his term in office. In August 1994, an 8-hour downpour caused massive damage in the state capital, wiping out most of the progress of the past three years. Omeruo estimated that it would cost N500 million to repair the damage. With a severe budget deficit, Omeruo said that the government would have to lay off 40% of its workers so it could pay the others on time and address developmental requirements. On 3 February 1996, he suspended the state-owned newspaper The Graphic indefinitely for making negative attacks on the state and federal government.
