= 2007 Kogi State gubernatorial election =

State election in Nigeria

- 14 April 2007
Nominee	Ibrahim Idris	Mohammed Abdulsalami Ohiare
Party	PDP	ACN
Popular vote	724,839	304,335
Governor before election
Ibrahim Idris
PDP
Elected Governor
Ibrahim Idris
PDP

The 2007 Kogi State gubernatorial election was the 4th gubernatorial election of Kogi State. Held on 14 April 2007, the People's Democratic Party nominee Ibrahim Idris won the election, defeating Mohammed Abdulsalami Ohiare of the Action Congress of Nigeria.

== Results ==
A total of 16 candidates contested in the election. Ibrahim Idris from the People's Democratic Party won the election, defeating Mohammed Abdulsalami Ohiare from the Action Congress of Nigeria. Registered voters was 1,479,834.

2007 Kogi State gubernatorial election
Party	Candidate	Votes	%	±%
PDP	Ibrahim Idris	724,839	0	
ACN	Mohammed Abdulsalami Ohiare	304,335	0	
PDP hold				
