= Omoyele Sowore =

Nigerian activist (born 1971)

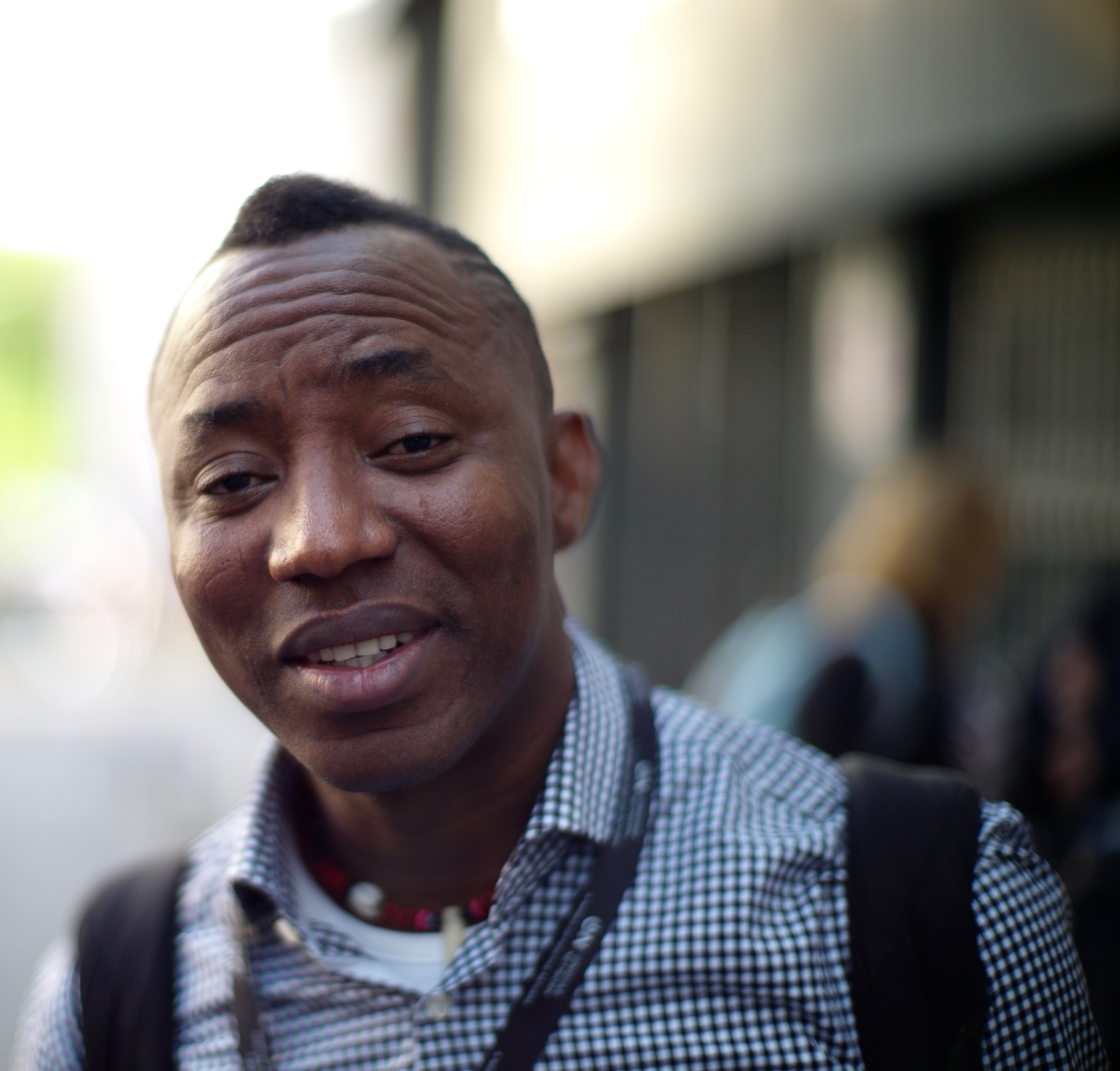
- Sowore in 2016
- Born: 16 February 1971 (age 55); Ondo State, Nigeria
- Education: University of Lagos; Columbia University
- Occupations: Human rights activist, Founder of Sahara Reporters, Citizen reporter, lecturer
- Political party: African Action Congress (2018–present
- Spouse: Opeyemi Sowore (m. 2004)
- Website: saharareporters.com

Omoyele Yele Sowore (born 16 February 1971) is a Nigerian politician, human rights activist, citizen reporter, writer, lecturer and pro-democracy campaigner, known for founding the online news agency Sahara Reporters. In August 2018, he founded the African Action Congress party and ran as its presidential candidate in the 2019 Nigerian general election. Sowore also ran for President in the 2023 Nigerian General elections.

On 3 August 2019, Sowore was arrested by the Nigerian State Security Service (SSS), for alleged treason after calling for a protest tagged RevolutionNow. He was arrested again and assaulted during a protest in Abuja on 1 January 2021. Sowore was injured by a police officer during a protest in Abuja on 31 May 2021.

== Early life and education ==
Yele Sowore is from Ese-Odo, Ondo State in South West Nigeria. Sowore was born in the Niger Delta region of the country (comprising six states in South-South region, Ondo, Abia and Imo States) where he was also raised in a polygamous home with sixteen children. At age 12, he learned to ride a motorcycle so that he could go to the lake to go fish for food to feed his entire family every morning before going to school. Sowore's passion and interest in media was sparked during the military rule in Nigeria.

Sowore studied Geography and Planning at the University of Lagos, from 1989 to 1995, his academic program extended by additional two years, after he was expelled twice for political reasons and student activism. He served as the President of the University of Lagos Student Union Government between 1992 and 1994 during which time he was involved in anti-cultism and anti-corruption advocacy. Sowore holds a master's degree in Public Administration from Columbia University.

== Career ==
=== Activism ===
In 1989, he participated in student demonstrations protesting the conditions of an International Monetary Fund (IMF) loan of $120 million to be used for a Nigerian oil pipeline. Included among the conditions of the IMF loan, was a reduction in the number of universities in Nigeria from 28 to 5.

In 1992, Sowore led 5,100 students in protest against the Nigerian government. The protest resulted in police opening fire and killing seven protesters. Sowore was arrested and tortured. Omoyele was also involved in the demand for a democratic government taking over military rule in Nigeria on 12 June 1993. This resulted in several arrests, detentions and life-threatening treatment of protesters by government officials.

A journalist, Niyi Babade, in his yet to be published memoir, also acknowledges Sowore's stride in the 12 June struggle - "Unannounced, they came out of an unmarked grey vehicle and saw the ugly scenes, then opened fire on all of us. I spent some quality time in my resting place, the gutter, till I heard the singing voices of the students of the University of Lagos led by Yele Sowore (now a Sahara reporter), heading to Abiola’s house. I crawled out of my hiding and tried to get an exclusive shot when the hoodlums among the students attacked me and wanted to confiscate my camera but with the heroic effort of Sowore, I was spared and allowed to join them, as one of the hoodlums and a journalist which then gave me unlimited access to exclusive footage of the day, till we got to Moshood Kashimawo Olawale (MKO) Abiola’s house."

==== Arrest ====
On 12 January 2017, the Lagos State Police Command arrested Sowore over a petition by a magazine publisher, Lekan Fatodu. Later in the evening of same day, Sowore confirmed the incident in a video he posted on his Facebook wall where he accused the police of supporting Fatodu while he assaulted him at the Area F Police Command.

==== Treason charges ====
Sowore was arrested by the DSS on 3 August 2019, ahead of a planned nationwide #RevolutionNow protest. The Federal Government, which later admitted to the arrest, was condemned by Wole Soyinka, Oby Ezekwesili and many other activists. He was later charged with "conspiracy to commit treason and insulting President Muhammadu Buhari".

On 24 September 2019, Sowore was granted bail by the Federal High Court Abuja, on the condition that he surrender his international passport within forty-eight hours. The DSS has refused to release Sowore claiming ignorance of the court order. The DSS' refusal to release Sowore led to protests at the UN Plaza in New York led by Sowore's wife and has sparked a global decry on Nigeria's failed democracy.

On 29 September 2019, Sowore made his first appearance in the media since his detention. He described his poor treatment, being locked up in a dark room without the sunlight. He also mentioned that "Boko Haram commanders who are engaged in high level terrorism have access to telephone, TV and even cable in their cells" while he is being denied such access. The court again set Sowore free on 5 December 2019, confirming that he had settled his bail terms. However, there was a wind of change the next change in court when DSS operatives evaded the premises to re-arrest him. He was finally released on 24 December 2019.

On 8 December 2021, The Federal High Court, Abuja, ordered the Department of State Services (DSS) to pay Omoyele Sowore, 2 million Naira over the unlawful seizure of his mobile phone in 2019 at the point of his arrest.

In March 2022, it was reported that Omoyele Sowore, sued the Nigeria Police Force and three others at the Federal High Court, Abuja, over violation of his fundamental human rights.

In September 2024, the Nigeria Immigration Service (NIS) detained Sowore at the Murtala Muhammed airport upon his arrival from the United States as he was alleged to be planning another protest on October, he was released after a brief detention and passport seizure according to the post on his Verified X (formerly Twitter) handle.

=== Sahara Reporters ===
Sowore started Sahara Reporters in New York City in 2006 to fight against corrupt and wrong government practices. Sahara Reporters is supported by grants from the Ford Foundation and Omidyar Network. As part of its policy, Sahara does not accept advertisements and financial support from the Nigerian Government .

== Presidential campaign ==
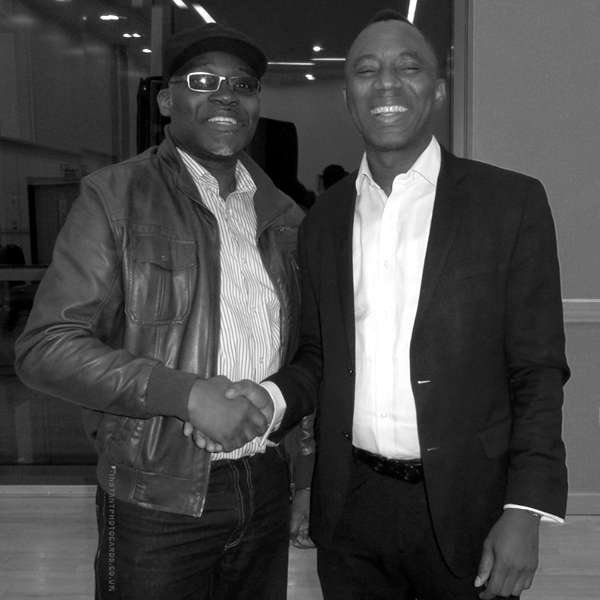
Sowore in Luton

On 25 February 2018, Sowore announced his intention to run for presidency in the 2019 Nigerian general election. In August 2018, he founded a political party, the African Action Congress (AAC), for which he would run for in 2019. On 6 October 2018, following successful primary elections at the AAC's national convention, Omoyele Sowore emerged unchallenged as the Presidential Candidate for the party. After touring many states in Nigeria, visiting dignitaries such as the Emir of Kano and Wole Soyinka, Sowore embarked on a fundraising tour around the world including Australia, the United States of America and the UK. He was in Luton, England, on 10 November 2018.

Sowore also contested the 2023 general election as the presidential candidate of his party (AAC) where he recorded 14,608 votes, an election he described as a "selection".

In 2026, Sowore won the presidential primary election for African Action Congress (AAC) emerging as it's presidential candidate towards Nigeria's 2027 presidential election.

=== Election result ===
Muhammadu Buhari of the All Progressives Congress (APC), polled 15,191,847 votes to win while his main contender, Atiku Abubakar of the People's Democratic Party got 11,264,977 votes to come second. Sowore came fifth with 33,953 votes ahead of other new entrants to the race like Fela Durotoye of the Alliance for New Nigeria (ANN), who polled 16,779, and Kingsley Moghalu of the Young Democratic Party (YPP), who garnered 21,886 votes.

On 1 March 2022, Sowore announced his intention to run for president in the 2023 Nigerian general election.

== Personal life ==
Sowore and his family have been residents of Haworth, New Jersey, United States.

In September 2021, it was reported that Sowore's younger brother had been shot dead by herdsmen or kidnappers in Edo state.

Justice Ijeoma Ojukwu of the Abuja division of the Federal High Court barred Sowore from travelling outside Abuja in October 2019. According to Sowore, the restriction prevented him from attending his brother’s burial.

== See also ==
- Dele Farotimi
