= Augustine Aniebo =

Nigerian general (born 1950)

Military Administrator of Kogi State
- In office August 1998 – May 1999
- Preceded by: Bzigu Afakirya
- Succeeded by: Abubakar Audu

Military Administrator of Borno State
- In office 1997 – August 1998
- Preceded by: Victor Ozodinobi
- Succeeded by: Lawal Haruna

Personal details
- Born: 23 March 1950 (age 76) Umunze, Southern Region, British Nigeria (now in Anambra State, Nigeria)

Military service
- Allegiance: Nigeria
- Branch/service: Nigerian Army
- Rank: Brigadier General

Augustine Aniebo (//; born 23 March 1950) is a retired Nigerian army brigadier general who served as military administrator of Borno State from 1997 to 1998 during the regime of General Sani Abacha and administrator of Kogi State from 1998 to 1999 during the regime of General Abdulsalami Abubakar, handing over to the elected civilian governor Abubakar Audu on 29 May 1999, at the start of the Fourth Republic.

His daughter is the molecular geneticist and public health scholar Ify Aniebo.

== Borno State Administrator ==
In May 1997, Nigerian security agents, working with Islamic leaders stormed a Christian church in Maiduguri, Borno State and ejected the pastor and church members. The church leaders appealed to Aniebo to act quickly to avoid a religious crisis. In 1998, he said that the Borno State task force against smuggling had been strengthened to reduce cross-border smuggling of petroleum products to neighboring countries.

== Kogi State Administrator ==
Appointed administrator of Kogi State in August 1998, Aniebo left office on 29 May 1999 and handed over to the new civilian government led by Olusegun Obasanjo. He developed Aniebo Quarters- a prominent residential housing estate in Lokoja, Kogi State, established during the military administration of General Augustine Aniebo. Located near the Ajaokuta-Ganaja Road and Gadumo areas, it primarily accommodates civil servants and is a major landmark within the state capital.The estate is situated in a growing, fast-developing corridor.
