= COVID-19 vaccination in Nigeria =

Plan to immunize against COVID-19

- Date: 5 March 2021–present
- Location: Nigeria
- Cause: COVID-19 pandemic
- Organised by: National Primary Health Care Development Agency
- Participants: 17,914,944 first doses; 8,197,832 second doses
- Outcome: 8.4% of the Nigerian population received at least one dose 3.8% of the Nigerian population fully vaccinated
- Website: nphcda.gov.ng
- As of 28 February 2022

COVID-19 vaccination in Nigeria is an ongoing immunization campaign against severe acute respiratory syndrome coronavirus 2 (SARS-CoV-2), the virus that causes coronavirus disease 2019 (COVID-19), in response to the ongoing pandemic in the country. Vaccination began on 5 March 2021. As of 28 February 2022, 17,914,944 people have received their first dose a COVID-19 vaccine, and 8,197,832 have received their second dose.

== History ==
=== Timeline ===
==== March 2021 ====
On 2 March, the first shipment of four million Oxford–AstraZeneca COVID-19 vaccine doses from the COVAX initiative arrived at Nnamdi Azikiwe International Airport.

Cyprian Ngong, a doctor at National Hospital, Abuja, became the first person in Nigeria to receive a COVID-19 vaccine on 5 March.

President Muhammadu Buhari received his first COVID-19 vaccine dose on 6 March.

On 21 March, Nigeria received an additional 300,000 doses of Oxford–AstraZeneca COVID-19 vaccines from MTN.

By the end of March, 0.7 million vaccine doses had been administered.

==== April 2021 ====
On 6 April, Nigeria received 100,000 doses of Oxford–AstraZeneca COVID-19 vaccines from the Government of India.

By the end of April, 1.2 million vaccine doses had been administered.

==== May 2021 ====
By the end of May, 1.6 million vaccine doses had been administered.

==== June 2021 ====
By the end of June, 3.4 million vaccine doses had been administered.

==== July 2021 ====
The vaccination campaign in Nigeria was paused on 9 July due to exhaustion of the first COVAX shipment that arrived in March.

By the end of July, 3.9 million vaccine doses had been administered.

==== August 2021 ====
On 1 August, Nigeria received four million doses of Moderna COVID-19 vaccines from the United States.

The second phase of the vaccination rollout began on 16 August.

By the end of August, 4.2 million vaccine doses had been administered.

==== September 2021 ====
By the end of September, 6.9 million vaccine doses had been administered.

==== October 2021 ====
On 8 October, Nigeria received 500,000 doses of Oxford–AstraZeneca COVID-19 vaccines from the Government of France.

By the end of October, 8.6 million vaccine doses had been administered. 4% of the target population had been fully vaccinated by the end of the month.

==== November 2021 ====
By the end of November, 9.8 million vaccine doses had been administered. 4% of the target population had been fully vaccinated by the end of the month.

==== December 2021 ====
Up to a million doses of the Oxford-AstraZeneca vaccine were destroyed by Nigeria due to their short expiry dates.

By the end of December, 14.8 million vaccine doses had been administered. 5% of the target population had been fully vaccinated by the end of the month.

==== January 2022 ====
By the end of January, 20.6 million vaccine doses had been administered. 6% of the target population had been fully vaccinated by the end of the month.

==== February 2022 ====
By the end of February, 26.5 million vaccine doses had been administered and 8.1 million persons had been fully vaccinated.

==== March 2022 ====
By the end of March, 31.4 million vaccine doses had been administered and 9.6 million persons had been fully vaccinated.

==== April 2022 ====
By the end of April, 38.4 million vaccine doses had been administered and 14.9 million persons had been fully vaccinated.

== Vaccines on order ==
Vaccine	Approval	Deployment
Oxford–AstraZeneca	Yes	Yes
Moderna	Yes	Yes
Janssen	Yes	No
Sputnik V	Yes	No
Pfizer–BioNTech	Yes	No
Sinopharm BIBP	Yes	No

== Rollout schedule ==
COVID-19 vaccination plan in Nigeria
Phase	Priority group	Progress
1	Health workers and supporting staff, frontline workers and first responders	In progress
2	Priority 1: Persons aged 60 years and above. Priority 2: Persons aged 50–59 years	In progress
3	Persons aged 18–49 years with co-morbidities	
4	The rest of the eligible population aged 18–49 years	

== Statistics ==
Total number of people receiving vaccinations in Nigeria as of 28 February 2022
1. Unvaccinated population: ~193,486,056 people (91.5%)
2. Population who received 1st dose: 9,717,112 people (28 February 2022) (4.60%)
3. Population who are fully vaccinated: 8,197,832 people (28 February 2022) (3.88%)
View source data.
Cumulative COVID-19 vaccine doses administered in Nigeria
1st dose
2nd dose

=== By state ===
Proportion vaccinated (1st dose) (Note: Percentage of target reached = (Total clients vaccinated (1st dose))/(Total eligible population targeted for COVID-19 vaccination) × 100%.)

16.0%

Proportion vaccinated (2nd dose) (Note: Percentage of target reached = (Total clients vaccinated (2nd dose))/(Total eligible population targeted for COVID-19 vaccination) × 100%.)

7.6%

COVID-19 vaccination in Nigeria by state, as of 28 February 2022
State	Total clients vaccinated (1st dose)	Total clients vaccinated (2nd dose)	Total clients vaccinated (booster dose)	
State	Total clients vaccinated (1st dose)	Total clients vaccinated (2nd dose)	Moderna	Pfizer
Abia	178,606	104,979	1,052	15,352
Adamawa	325,185	140,431	81	7,670
Akwa Ibom	170,729	78,381	24	1,587
Anambra	138,288	62,047	147	1,325
Bauchi	322,583	128,349	698	4,240
Bayelsa	57,895	23,222	202	726
Benue	288,182	103,910	132	1,052
Borno	200,699	73,697	85	2,766
Cross River	354,326	172,314	298	15,539
Delta	543,596	354,427	7,709	18,736
Ebonyi	96,268	37,793	90	134
Edo	208,074	97,024	1,042	1,642
Ekiti	300,453	170,761	151	3,802
Enugu	200,522	71,349	129	2,467
FCT	453,323	253,528	1,821	18,282
Gombe	238,851	136,204	638	20,256
Imo	132,663	72,851	24	1,056
Jigawa	2,391,500	716,180	109	16,638
Kaduna	403,613	210,424	678	6,317
Kano	1,797,509	698,910	6,550	140,078
Katsina	446,009	150,495	474	7,564
Kebbi	267,666	127,030	1,645	17,919
Kogi	230,523	77,955	235	159
Kwara	452,723	211,390	230	2,287
Lagos	1,560,402	1,010,498	599	54,514
Nasarawa	1,144,679	611,963	1,288	199,669
Niger	363,643	139,411	89	3,117
Ogun	942,275	499,162	338	16,326
Ondo	412,164	204,788	98	2,994
Osun	564,513	257,106	233	8,903
Oyo	926,268	460,234	231	15,325
Plateau	250,841	128,225	664	2,658
Rivers	404,555	193,151	744	10,094
Sokoto	234,880	76,227		52
Taraba	206,826	70,918	511	2,474
Yobe	200,970	69,729	159	3,542
Zamfara	503,142	202,589	359	40,085

== See also ==
- COVID-19 vaccination in Africa
