= Nigeria Electoral Act =

Electoral Act

National Assembly of Nigeria
- Enacted by: National Assembly of Nigeria
- Administered by: Independent National Electoral Commission (Nigeria)

The Electoral Act is a Nigerian federal law regulating the conduct of federal, state elections, and Area Council election of the Federal Capital Territory. It establishes provisions governing the Independent National Electoral Commission (Nigeria) (INEC), voter registration, electoral procedures, political parties, campaign finance, electoral offences and the determination of election petitions. The Act also provides a statutory framework for the use of technology in voter accreditation and the electronic transmission of polling-unit results.

== History ==
Nigeria's electoral legislation has undergone series of revisions since Nigeria became a democratic nation in 1999. The principal federal electoral statutes during the Fourth Republic have included the Electoral Act 2001, Electoral Act 2002, Electoral Act 2006, Electoral Act 2010, Electoral Act 2022 and Electoral Act 2026. Each successive Act repealed or replaced the principal electoral legislation that preceded it, while amendments were also enacted between the major revisions. The latest amendment is the 2026 Electoral Act.

== Structure ==
The current Electoral Act (Act of 2026) contains 156 sections divided into nine parts and accompanying schedules.

The parts of the Act are:

Part I – Establishment and functions of the Independent National Electoral Commission

Part II – Staff of the Commission

Part III – National Register of Voters and voters' registration

Part IV – Procedure at election

Part V – Political parties

Part VI – Procedure for election to Area Council

Part VII – Electoral offences

Part VIII – Determination of election petitions arising from elections

Part IX – Miscellaneous provisions

== Provisions ==
=== Independent National Electoral Commission ===
Part I establishes provisions relating to the Independent National Electoral Commission (INEC). Section 1 recognizes the Commission as a body corporate with perpetual succession and provides that its national headquarters shall be situated in the Federal Capital Territory.

Section 2 sets out additional functions of the commission, including conducting voter and civic education, promoting knowledge of democratic election processes and conducting referendums where required under the Constitution or an Act of the National Assembly.

=== Voter registration ===
Part III provides for the National Register of Voters. The Act requires INEC to compile, maintain and continuously update the register. The register includes persons entitled to vote in federal, state, local government and Federal Capital Territory Area Council elections, and includes disaggregated disability-status information.

The register is to be maintained in both electronic and manual formats. The Act provides for continuous voter registration, subject to a requirement that registration, updating and revision of the register stop not later than 90 days before an election covered by the Act.

=== Election procedure ===
The Part IV of the act regulates the conduct of elections, including notice of election, nomination and withdrawal of candidates, polling units, ballot papers, accreditation and voting, counting, collation, declaration of results and access to election documents.

Under section 28, INEC is required to publish a notice of election not later than 300 days before the day appointed for an election under the Act.

== The 2026 Nigeria Electoral Act ==
The Nigerian National Assembly passed the harmonized Electoral Act Amendment Bill 2026, approving the electronic transmission of election results to the INEC Result Viewing (IReV) portal while retaining Form EC8A as a manual fallback during network failures.

Key Details of the 2026 Electoral Bill

• Clause 60 Provisions: Permits electronic transmission of results from polling units to the IReV portal.

• Manual Backup: Allows the use of physical Form EC8A for collation and declaration if technical or internet connectivity issues prevent electronic upload.

• Legislative Path: Following initial controversy and public outcry over attempts to omit real-time specifications, both the Senate and House of Representatives harmonized and passed the final version in February 2026.

• Election Timeline Adjustment: Changed the mandatory election notice period from 360 days to 300 days to prevent the 2027 general elections from overlapping with religious fasting periods.
