= Opeyemi Sowore =

Nigerian-American businesswoman

Opeyemi Oluwole Sowore is the Nigerian American wife of Omoyele Sowore. She came to public view after several advocacy for Omoyele Sowore to be released after the journalist was rearrested by the Department of State Services on charges of threat to National Security including treasonable felony, cyberstalking and money laundering on December 6, being earlier arrested on August 3, 2019.

She has led several protests and discourses over the detention of her husband by the Department of State Services including leading protesters to the United Nations Plaza in New York on September 24, 2019, advocating global intervention from Democracy Now and the US Senate into the release of Omoyele.

== Career and education ==
She is the Vice President, Head of Consumer Engagement at Teladoc Health having previously led as executive at American Express, Citigroup and Delta Air Lines. She holds a BA from State University of New York at Binghamton in 1995 and an MBA from the Simon School of Business at the University of Rochester in 1997.
