= Akinwunmi Rhodes-Vivour =

Nigerian jurist

Chief Akinwunmi R.W. Rhodes-Vivour (1910–1987) was a Nigerian Judge and an influential personality in Midwest Nigeria.

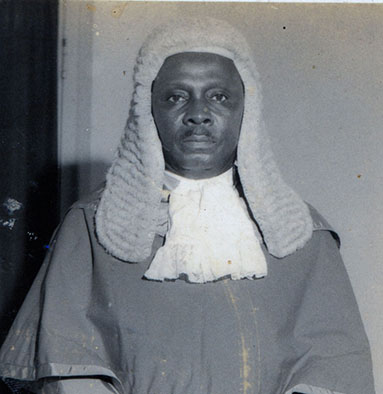
Justice Akinwunmi Rhodes-Vivour

== Early life ==
A son of Garnet Bankole Vivour and Sarah Rhodes, Akinwunmi Rhodes-Vivour was born on 8 July 1910, in Lagos Island. He attended the Methodist church primary school and received his secondary school education at the Wesleyan Boys high school, Lagos Nigeria, now Methodist Boys High School, Lagos. He eventually became the treasurer of the Old boys association.

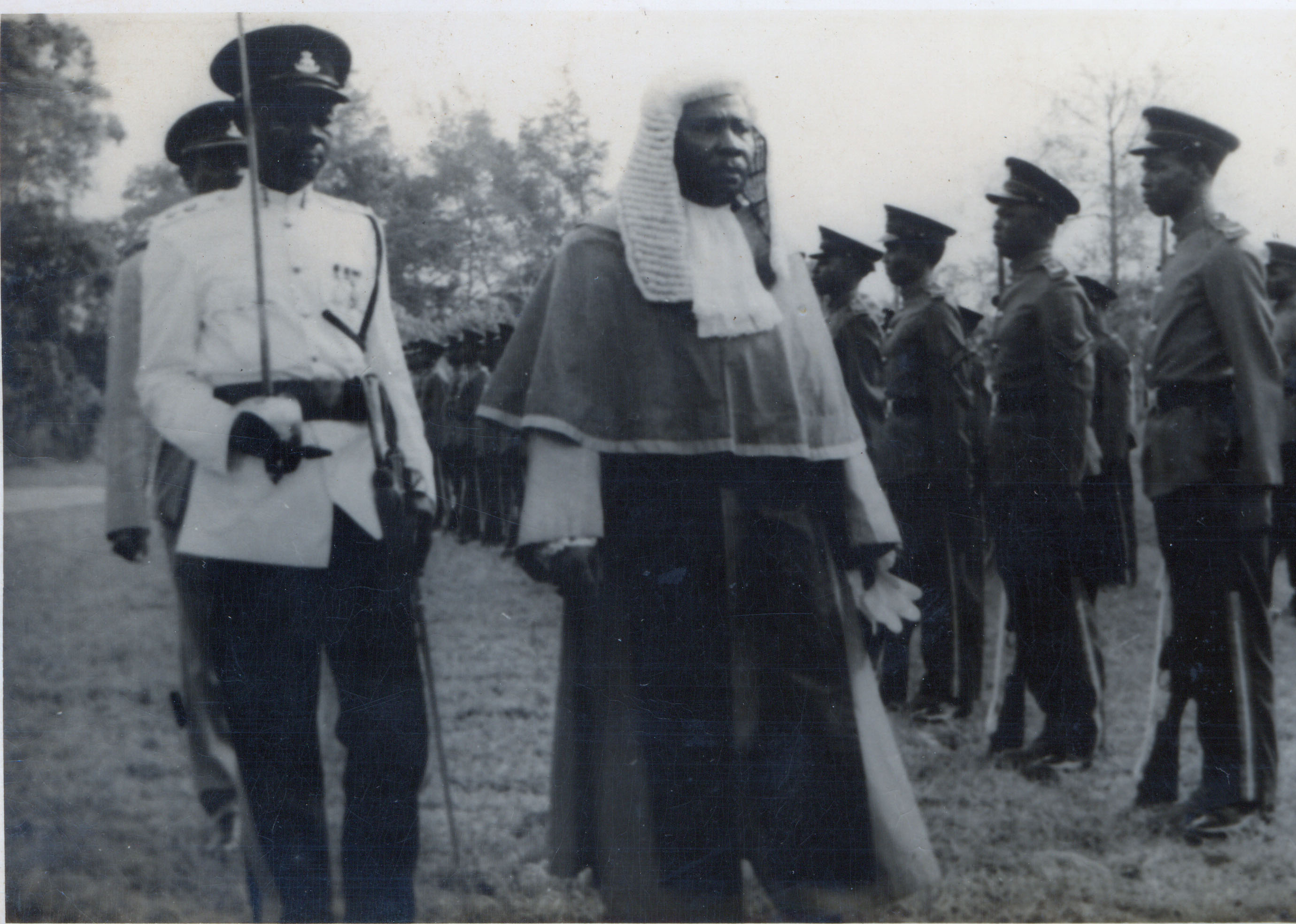
R.W.A. Rhodes-Vivour inspecting the guard of honour at the opening of the Assizes in October 1966

== Education ==
He obtained a Diploma from the British Institute of Engineering Technology, London in Surveying and practiced surveying for ten years during which he worked for Shell and D’Arcy Exploration between 1939- 1942.

His uncle, Justice S.B.Rhodes, was a major influence in his life and inspired him to read law. In 1943, he decided to read Law and proceeded to London where he was admitted to the Honourable Society Of Middle Temple. He was called to the Bar on 18 November 1946. Thereafter, he commenced legal practice in Nigeria.

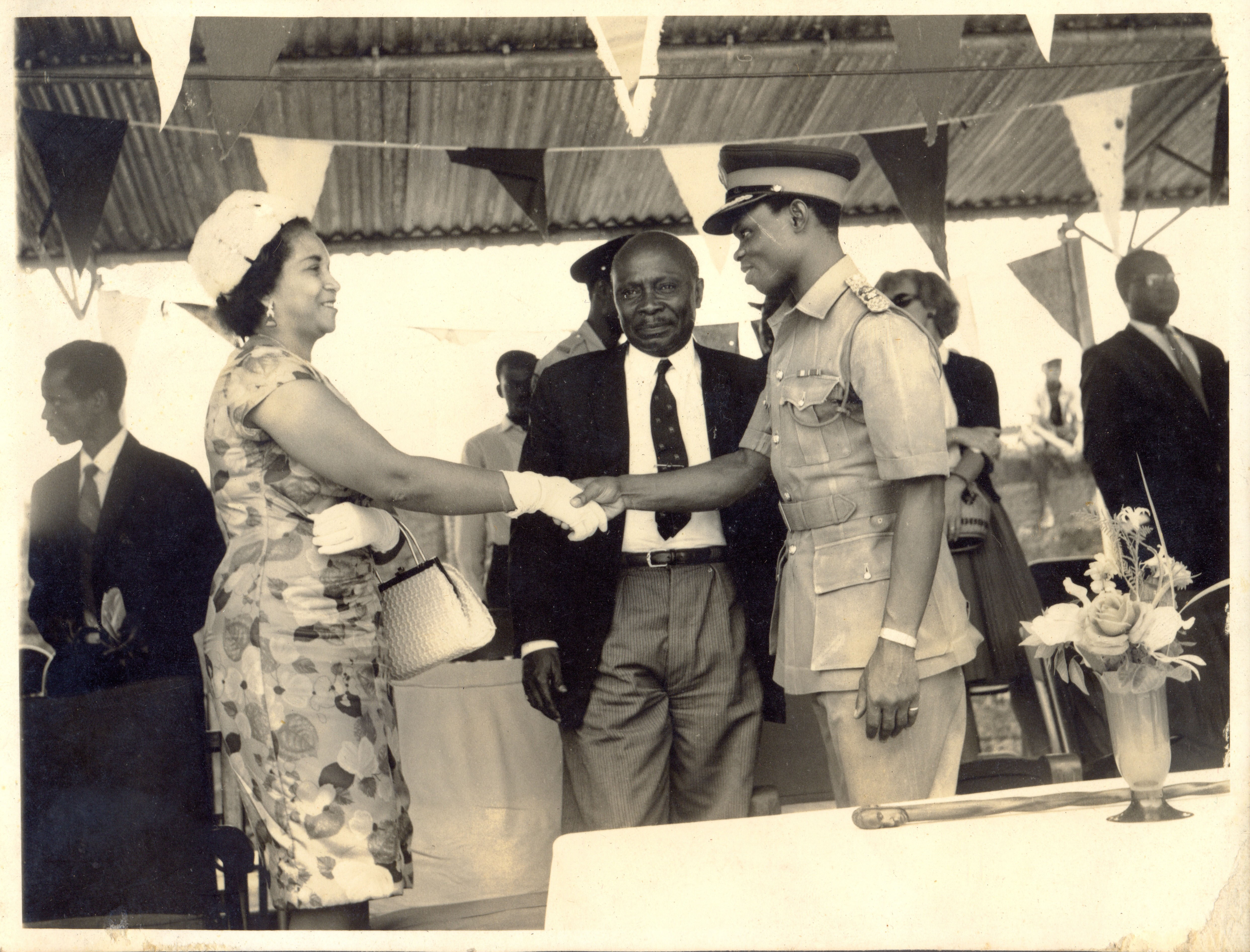
Justice Akinwunmi Rhodes-Vivour introducing his wife to David Ejoor (governor of the Mid-Western State)

== Judiciary ==
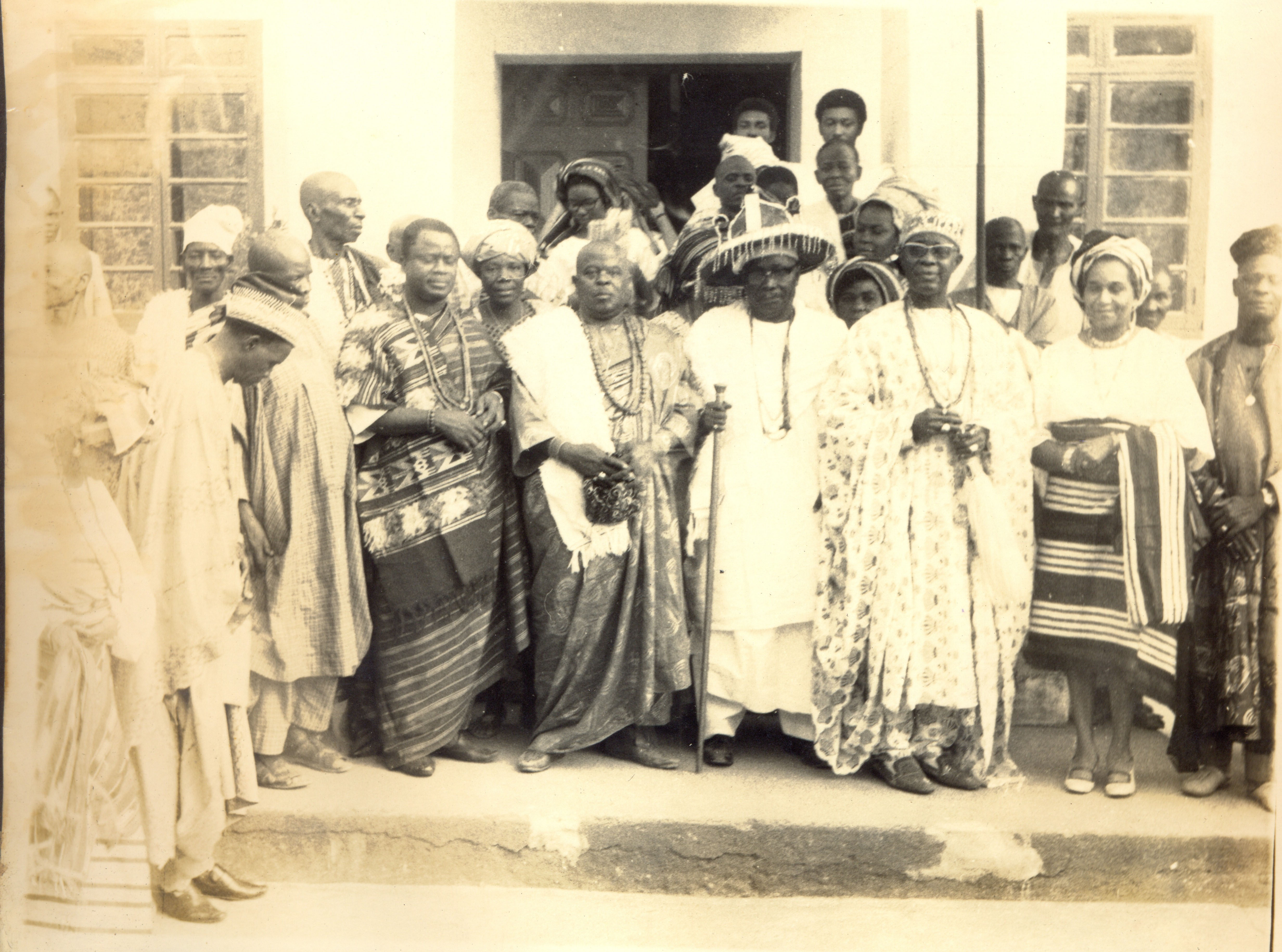
Justice Rhodes-Vivour getting his chieftaincy title from the Alake of Egbaland.

He joined the Colonial administration on 1 August 1950 and was appointed Magistrate Grade 1. He served meritoriously throughout the Western Region of Nigeria and was appointed Senior Magistrate on 1 July 1955, Chief Magistrate (Western Nigeria) on 18 May 1961 and eventually Justice of the High Court on 13 February 1964. He retired in 1972 at age 62.

Justice Rhodes-Vivour played a significant part in the conflicts relating to the Urhobo and Ijaw settlers in Warri in respect to land in Warri.

== Scandal ==
Justice Rhodes-Vivour was dispensing justice quietly in his court when he was hit. The story that floated about was that he had fallen out of grace with the powers that be.

Justice Rhodes-Vivour of the Bendel State High Court, was pushed aside during the Military Governorship of Mid-West of Colonel Samuel Ogbemudia. In order to complete his disgrace he was charged to court with accepting a bribe from one Janet Johnson an offence which turned out to be a frame up. He was tried by Mr Justice Uche Omo. If Uche Omo, had wanted to buy official favour with the blood of Rhodes-Vivour, the latter would have worn prisoner's dress at least until his appeal was allowed. Uche Omo tried Rhodes-Vivour according to law and acquitted him.'

The government can bear you a grudge and proceed to look for excuses to get rid of you. This is what happened to Rhodes-Vivour. So some Judges therefore give judgments in favour of government to avoid being sacked.

== Honors ==
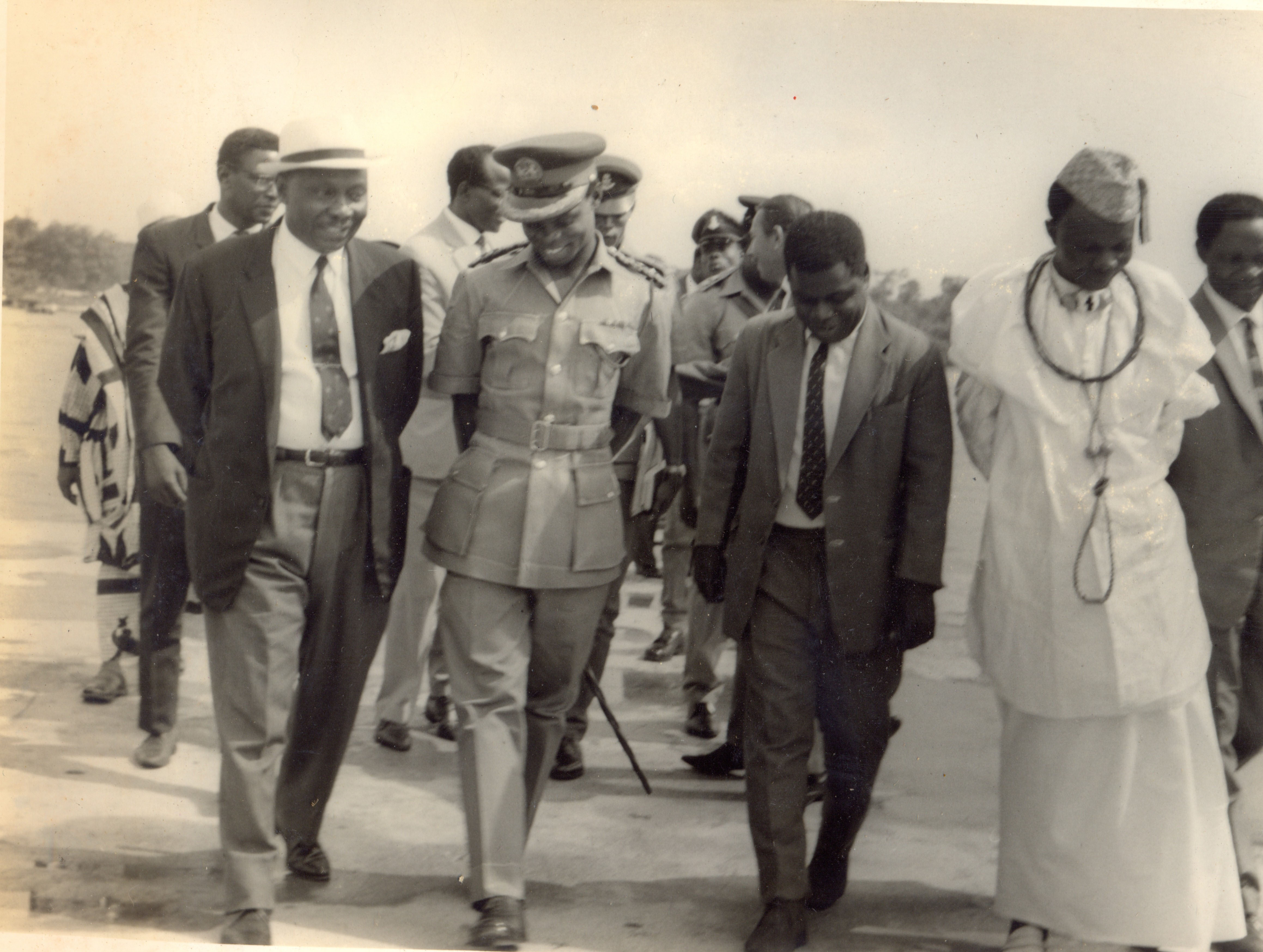
L-R; Justice Rhodes-Vivour, David Ejoor (Governor of the Mid western states), and the Olu of Warri.

On 23 November 1972, he received his chieftaincy title from the Alake of Egbaland.

Chief Rhodes-Vivour was a member of the Island Club, Lagos and the Metropolitan Club Lagos.

== Family ==
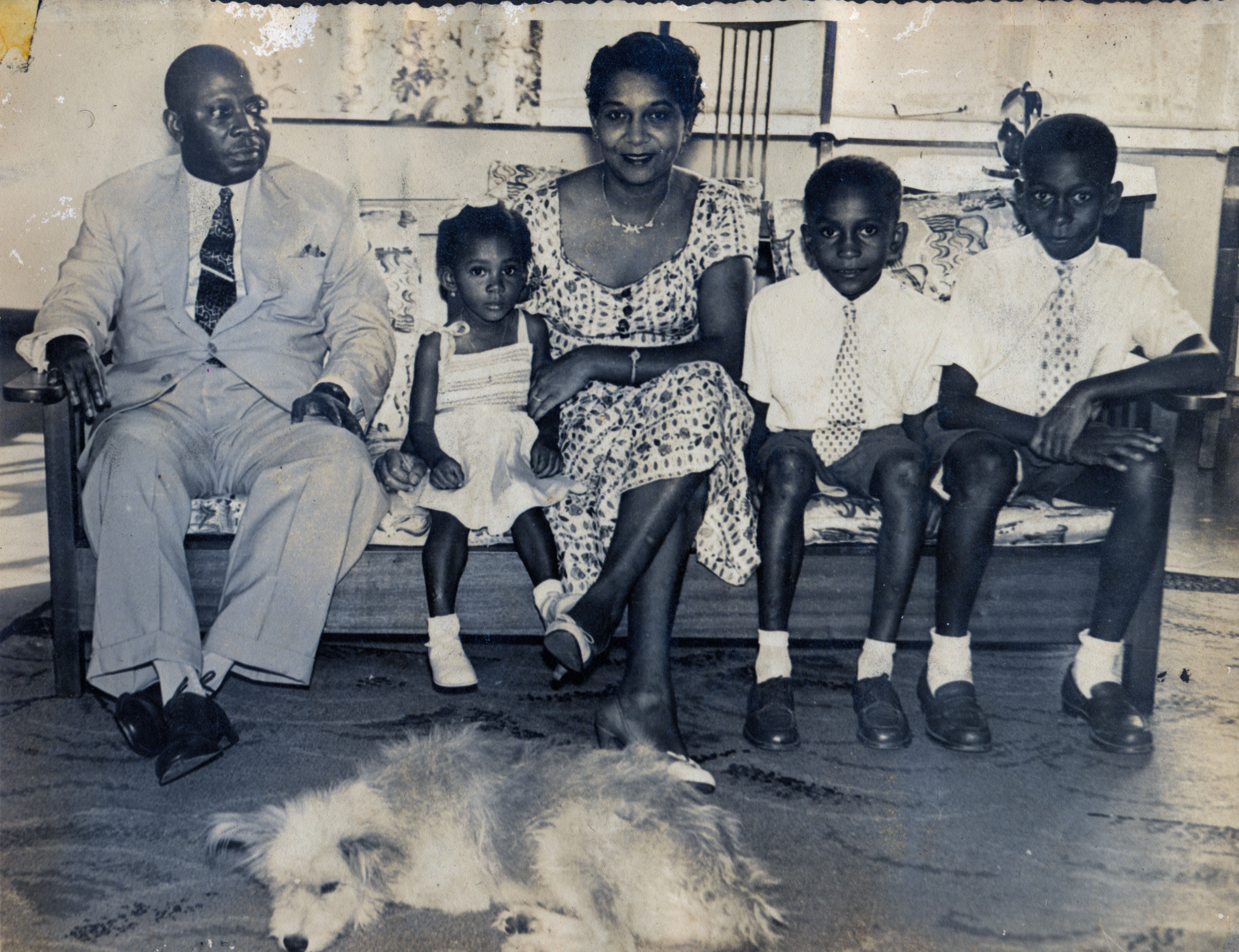
Justice Rhodes-Vivour immediate family - L-R; Justice Rhodes-Vivour, Tejumade, Marjorie (née Walker), Bode, Olawale

On his maternal side, meanwhile, he was the grandson of S.B. Rhodes I and the nephew of Justice S.B Rhodes II. He married Marjorie (née Walker), whom he met in London whilst studying law. They had three children: Olawale Rhodes-Vivour, Justice Bode Rhodes-Vivour and Tejumade Nwogu nee Rhodes-Vivour
