= Censorship in Nigeria =

In Nigeria, the freedom of expression is protected by Section 39 (1) of the Federal Republic of Nigeria constitution. Despite this constitutional protection, the Nigerian media was controlled by the government throughout much of its history, with some even to this day. By 2020, however, over 100 newspapers in Nigeria were independent. Furthermore, there was a brief period from 1979 to 1983 when the government of the Second Nigerian Republic handed over the task of censorship to the military. Nigerian censors typically target certain kinds of ideas, such as ethnic discussions, political opposition, and morality incorrectness. However there is a new law about censorship that limits the freedom of speech in Nigeria called the antisocial media law.

== Press censorship ==
From 1859 to 1960, the Nigerian press was privately owned. However, this did not guarantee the freedom of speech since the majority of newspaper proprietors were actively involved in politics. Therefore, these newspapers typically acted as advocates of their owner's political interest. In addition, the pressure coming from ethnic groups was also a contributing factor to self-censorship among news organizations. News that expose certain “undesirable” aspects of a tribe may suffer a boycott, or in some cases cause ethnic tension. An example of this kind of ethnic tension happened in 1957, when the Igbo newspaper the West African Pilot provided news with a clear bias against a Yoruba political group called Egbe Omo Oduduwa. The Yorubas responded by launching their own news outlet called the Daily Service in order to retaliate and making corrections to those statements. From then on, in order to avoid conflicts, each news organization catered their message according to the desire of the local leaders. For example, the Tribune tends to be more considerate when mentioning issues related to the Yorubas while the Kaduna-based New Nigerians carefully vetted the northern opinion on national matters. The Yorubas, as an ethnic group, have the most influence over the news since they occupy most media-rich territories in the country, including the country's largest city. Today, newspapers continue to represent the interests of distinct ethnic groups.

In 1961, the government started an operation to gain control of the press. It began with the seizure of the Morning Post's headquarters, a very prominent and important news outlet in Lagos. The government then controlled it so tightly that the paper eventually went into decline and shut down in 1972.

After the demise of the Morning Post, other newspapers followed suit as the government slowly expanded its influence over the press. Although many news organizations did go out of business as a result of being manipulated by the government, others such as the Daily Times of Nigeria survived and continue to operate to this day despite having been controlled by the government since 1977.

In 1999, freedom of expression became protected by the new Nigerian Constitution. However, defamation laws were afterwards passed. Critics maintain that though measures of freedom of the press have improved, there is still room for improvement. Nigeria was described as "partly free" in the Freedom of the Press 2011 report published by the Freedom House (see yearly rankings in Freedom House ratings in Nigeria section).

On April 26, 2020, the Reporters without Borders World Press Freedom Index ranked Nigeria 115th out of 180 countries surveys. Reporters without Borders cited killings, detentions and the brutalisation of journalists alongside targeted attempts to shrink the civic space by the Nigerian government as reason for the ranking. However, this rank is higher than the rank of 146th which Transparency International gave Nigeria earlier in the year regarding corruption. The Reporters without Borders report further stated “With more than 100 independent newspapers, Africa’s most populous nation enjoys real media pluralism but covering stories involving politics, terrorism or financial embezzlement by the powerful is very problematic."

=== Gag orders ===
In July 2021, the National Broadcasting Commission issued a gag order barring all journalists and broadcast stations in the country from reporting details of terrorists, kidnappers, and victims. After unsuccessfully calling for the gag order's withdrawal, the Socio-Economic Rights and Accountability Project (SERAP) and the Centre for Journalism Innovation and Development (PTCIJ) filed a lawsuit against President Muhammadu Buhari and Minister of Information and Culture Lai Mohammed, with National Broadcasting Commission also named as a defendant. The plaintiffs asked the court to “declare illegal the gag order" and to compel the defendants to withdraw the directive, arguing that it was "inconsistent and incompatible with sections 22 and 39 of the Nigerian Constitution, Article 9 of the African Charter on Human and Peoples’ Rights and Article 19 of the International Covenant on Civil and Political Rights".

== Military censorship ==
In 1983, the power of the Second Republic was challenged due to accusations of vote rigging and electoral malfeasance. As a result, the newly elected government decided to leave the military with the task of censorship. At the hand of the military, however, writers felt a certain level of immunity from persecution, especially when it was known that “generals don’t read novels”. On one occasion, a student named Oherei was arrested and accused of being a communist sympathizer when he published a novel called “Behind the Iron Curtain”. He was then acquitted two days after the arrest.

When the Second Republic was overthrown on December 31, 1983, the task of censorship was once again given back to the federal government. However, as of 2013, military censorship was still applicable to information regarding military strategy and confidential materials for security purposes.

== Electronic media and entertainment censorship ==
In 1978, the government created the News Agency of Nigeria (NAN), which was responsible for censoring electronic media, such as radio, television, and DVD. Electronic media was predominantly privately owned, but the government was able to influence content through the NAN.

In June 1994, the National Film and Video Censors Board replaced the NAN as the official schedule agency of the government. It is responsible for licensing film makers and reviewing their works accordingly to the following criteria: educational and entertainment value; national security sensitivity; avoidance of blasphemy, obscenity, and criminality; avoidance of provoking religious and racial confrontation; abstention from violence and corruption; and abstention from disrespecting African personalities. The National Film and Video Censors Board banned the film I Hate My Village due to the presence of cannibalism in it. In 2002, the board banned the following films: Omo Empire, Outcast 1 and 2, Shattered Home and Night Out (Girls for Sale) because they damaged “every known decent and noble tendency of the African psyche and culture,” by portraying obscene acts among young women in certain cuts of the film.

== See also ==
- Hate speech laws in Nigeria
