= Idris Wada =

Nigerian politician (born 1950)

Governor of Kogi State
- In office 27 January 2012 – 27 January 2016
- Deputy: Yomi Awoniyi
- Preceded by: Ibrahim Idris
- Succeeded by: Yahaya Bello

Personal details
- Born: Idris Ichala Wada; 26 August 1950 (age 76) Dekina, Northern Region, British Nigeria (now in Kogi State, Nigeria)
- Party: Peoples Democratic Party
- Occupation: Politician

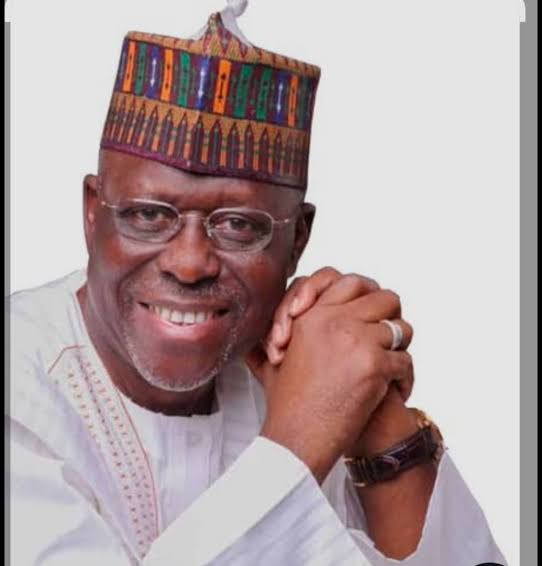
captain Idris Wada

Idris Ichala Wada (born 26 August 1950) is a Nigerian retired pilot and politician who served as governor of Kogi State from 2012 to 2016.

== Biography ==
Wada was born on August 26, 1950, an indigene of the Dekina Local Government Area of Kogi State.

In 1954, he enrolled in a primary school in Onitsha, Anambra State. He then moved to Kano to complete it in 1963. Thereafter, he attended King's Commercial College in Buguma, Rivers State. Idris Wada later proceeded to the University of Abuja where he acquired both his B.Sc., and M.Sc. in Business Administration.

== Career ==
Wada worked in the aviation sector, holding positions such as flight instructor, chief pilot, and general manager for 35 years before retiring and entering politics.
