= Bode Rhodes-Vivour =

Nigerian jurist (born 1951)

Justice of the Supreme Court of Nigeria
- In office 16 September 2010 – 22 March 2021

Personal details
- Born: 22 March 1951 (age 75) Lagos State, Nigeria
- Party: Non partisian
- Parent: Justice Akinwunmi Rhodes-Vivour (father)
- Education: University of Lagos; University of Nairobi

Bode Rhodes-Vivour CFR (born 22 March 1951) is a Nigerian jurist and former justice of the Supreme Court of Nigeria.

== Early life ==
Bode Rhodes-vivour was born on 22 March 1951 in Lagos Island, a city in western Nigeria. to the family of Mr and Mrs Akinwunmi Rhodes-Vivour. He obtained a bachelor's degree in Law from the University of Lagos in 1974 and was called to the bar in 1975 after graduating from the Nigerian Law School. In 1983, he received a certificate in Legislative Drafting from the University of Nairobi under the Commonwealth Programme.

== Law career ==
In 1975, he joined the Lagos State Judiciary as State Counsel and became Director of Public Prosecutions in 1989. He was appointed a High Court Judge in 1994 and in 2005 appointed to the Nigerian courts of appeal as Justice.

In August 2010, he was appointed a Justice of the Supreme Court of Nigeria along with Justice Suleiman Galadima.

== Personal life ==
He is married to Adedoyin Rhodes-Vivour.

== See also ==
- List of Justice of the Nigerian courts of appeals
