= Abubakar Audu =

Nigerian politician (1947–2015)

Governor of Kogi State
- In office 29 May 1999 – 29 May 2003
- Deputy: Patrick Adaba
- Preceded by: Augustine Aniebo
- Succeeded by: Ibrahim Idris
- In office January 1992 – November 1993
- Preceded by: Danladi Mohammed Zakari
- Succeeded by: Paul Omeruo

Benue State Commissioner for Finance and Economic Planning
- In office 1986–1988

Personal details
- Born: 24 October 1947
- Died: 22 November 2015 (aged 68) Ogbonicha, Kogi State, Nigeria
- Resting place: Ogbonicha, Ofu, Kogi State, Nigeria
- Party: All Progressives Congress
- Children: Prince Mustapha Mona Audu, Maymunah Audu, Shuaibu Audu

Prince Abubakar Audu (24 October 1947 – 22 November 2015) was a Nigerian career banker and politician who was the first civilian governor of Kogi State. He ruled Kogi State twice (first in the Third Republic and second, in the Fourth Republic). His first tenure was from January 1992 until November 1993 and the second from 29 May 1999 to 29 May 2003. He died due to a bleeding ulcer before the announcement of the election results on 22 November 2015, while seeking to be re-elected as governor on the platform of Nigeria's ruling party, All Progressives Congress (APC).

== Early life and education ==
Audu was born on 27 October 1947, to the family of his Royal Highness, the late Pa Audu Oyidi, Orego Atta of Igala Land and the paramount ruler of Ogbonicha-Alloma in Ofu Local Government Area of Kogi State.

He started his education at the N.A. Junior Primary School, Alloma, and later N.A. Senior School Ankpa, from where he proceeded to Dennis Memorial Grammar School, Onitsha. He later transferred to the Jos Commercial College where he obtained both the GCE O and A level.

== Professional career ==
After a stint as a bank worker, Audu later proceeded to London from 1975-1978 where he studied banking and personnel management, obtaining professional qualification as a certified secretary, and as a Fellow of the Association of International Accountants of London, as well as fellowship of the Chartered Institute of Industrial Administration of Nigeria.

Audu's banking career lasted for a total of 25 years, which he spent with First Bank - formerly known as Standard Bank. Here, he served in various capacities at management level until 1991. He also made history as the bank's first training officer of African descent and also as one of the first black senior management staff of Standard Chartered Bank in London and New York.

In 1991, he was appointed Executive Director of FSB International Bank PLC.

== Politics and public service ==
Audu's public service began in 1986, when he was appointed Commissioner for Finance and Economic Planning in the old Benue state. He served in this capacity until 1988 when the cabinet was dissolved. He then returned to First Bank of Nigeria PLC as a General Manager.

In August 1991, Kogi state was created from parts of the old Benue and Kwara states. This coincided with one of Nigeria's many previous encounters with democracy, and Audu, being part of those who had advocated for the creation of the state and a notable son of the soil, was invited to contest for governorship. He contested on the platform of the National Republican Convention (NRC) and won the election held in November, 1991. He was subsequently sworn in as the first executive governor of Kogi state in January 1992.

In 1998, democracy was again re-introduced and Audu, now with the All Nigeria People's Party (ANPP), was elected again with over 700,000 votes. He was sworn in on 29 May 1999, during the 1999 Kogi State gubernatorial election as the 2nd Executive Governor of Kogi State.

== Major achievements ==
=== Infrastructure ===
His socio-economic contribution in the state is to date a point of reference to the generality of the people and many aspiring leaders. Some of his major achievements during his brief first term of office include the establishment of three different housing schemes for public officers consisting of over 1,500 housing units in Lokoja, the transformation of Lokoja township with asphalt roads, street lights, aesthetic roundabouts, the construction of inter-township and rural roads, over 75 electrification schemes and 50 water projects.

Others include the founding of Kogi State Polytechnic, the establishment of a television station, radio station (both AM and FM), a state newspaper (The Graphic) and the transformation of the colonial residence of Lord Lugard into an ultra modern government house complex, the construction of office blocks for ministries as the new state had no office accommodation, the construction of shopping arcade complex to enhance commercial activities, among others.

=== Abuja State Liaison Office, Sports Complex and Confluence Beach Hotel ===
He also pioneered the construction of the first ultra modern state liaison office in Abuja. His administration also built an ultra modern stadium and a five star hotel in Lokoja, the Confluence Beach Hotel.

=== Obajana Cement Factory ===
He also took steps to woo prospective investors to harness the numerous solid mineral potentials in the State. The big prize was the establishment of Obajana Cement Factory. The project, which was on going before he left office, attracted the support of the United States Government. During the visit of former U.S.President Bill Clinton to Nigeria, the State Government signed the agreement with the US Trade Development Agency (TDA) for a grant to finalize the feasibility work on the project. The cement project is now operational.

=== Establishment of the Kogi State University, Anyigba ===
The establishment of a state university, Kogi State University Anyigba, is another testimony to the vision and resourcefulness. The foundation stone was laid on 30 November 1999, when former President Olusegun Obasanjo, visited the state. About a year later, the president returned to Anyigba during a state visit to commission the university complex. According to a report of a visitation panel to the university from the Nigeria University Commission, the institution was then described as the fastest growing university in the country. The university received tremendous international support, which included an affiliation programme with Morgan State University in Baltimore, Maryland. Also, seven visiting professors from various universities in the United States were at the university to review its curriculum and align it with their own universities and prepare the students for exchange programme to give the university an international acceptability.

Audu completed several landmark projects within four years. They include: 250 units housing estate, a sport complex, a specialist eye hospital and 25 other medical institutions. Others were a government girls secondary school on student exchange programme, 350 borehole schemes, 300 kilometers of township roads, the procurement of 100 transit buses and completion of 40 rural electrification projects.

He was also named the best governor in the 1999-2003 dispensation, despite being a governor on the platform of the opposition, the ANPP.

== Relationship with the international community ==
A highly traveled politician, Audu brought so many honors to the country through his personal relationships with foreign statesmen. He enjoyed a relationship with the former British Prime Minister, John Major. In 1993, he and the member of his family were special guests of the British Prime Minister at No. 10 Downing Street where he hosted them to a state banquet. Also in 1993, he attended the Commonwealth Heads of Government Meeting in Cyprus. His connection with the international community saved Nigeria during the heady days of Shonekan administration from economic embargo. In December 1999, he was on the delegation of President Olusegun Obasanjo during the state visit to Germany.

== Subsequent gubernatorial bids ==
Audu contested in the 2003 Kogi State gubernatorial elections but lost. In the 2007 election, Audu was again defeated due mainly to resentment created by his dictatorial and authoritarian style exhibited during his previous tenure as governor of the state and the incumbent, Ibrahim Idris, was reelected. Audu went to the election tribunal who nullified that election, and ordered fresh elections. Audu again contested against Ibrahim Idris, and again was defeated.

In 2012, Audu contested against a newcomer to the field, Captain Idris Ichalla Wada, and was defeated by another election allegedly fraught with fraud. The result of the particular election were allegedly announced while collation was still ongoing.

== Corruption allegations ==
When Audu left office in 2003, he was charged by Nigeria's anti-corruption agency, the Economic and Financial Crimes Commission (EFCC), with corruption. This case has been on for twelve years and many say it was coined as an attempt by the ruling PDP to smear Audu's image, especially in light of the achievements recorded during his tenure.

He responded to these allegations, stating that while he was governor, the state received less than N400 million as monthly allocation, and that it would have been impossible to embezzle the N12 billion that the agency claims he did when he received less than N19 billion in total, yet embarked on many projects.

== 2015 gubernatorial run ==
Audu emerged as the candidate of the All Progressive Congress (APC) at the 28 August Kogi State gubernatorial primary election. Subsequently, he announced James Abiodun Faleke, a legislator, as his running mate.

== Death ==
Audu died of a bleeding ulcer on 22 November 2015, shortly before the Independent National Electoral Commission announced the Kogi State gubernatorial election as inconclusive. He had recorded more votes than his opponent in the elections but due to the dilemma created by his sudden death, his party APC, chose the runner up of the primary elections, Yahaya Bello, as the candidate to replace him.

== See also ==
- All Progressives Congress
- Bola Tinubu
- John Odigie Oyegun
- Kogi
