= List of governors of Kogi State =

This is a list of Kogi State administrators and governors. Kogi State was created on 27 August 1991 out of Benue State and Kwara State.

Name	Title	Took office	Left office	Party	Notes
Danladi Mohammed Zakari	Administrator	28 August 1991	January 1992	Military	
Abubakar Audu	Governor	January 1992	November 1993	NRC	First democratically elected governor
Colonel Paul Omeruo	Administrator	9 December 1993	22 August 1996	Military	
Colonel Bzigu Afakirya	Administrator	22 August 1996	August 1998	Military	
Augustine Aniebo	Administrator	August 1998	May 1999	Military	
Abubakar Audu	Governor	29 May 1999	29 May 2003	APP; ANPP	
Ibrahim Idris	Governor	29 May 2003	6 February 2008	PDP	
Clarence Olafemi	Acting Governor	6 February 2008	5 April 2008	PDP	He assumed office after the removal of the governor, Ibrahim Idris and his deputy, Philip Salawu by Supreme Court. Clarence Olafemi was the speaker Kogi State Assembly.
Ibrahim Idris	Governor	5 April 2008	26 January 2012	PDP	
Idris Wada	Governor	27 January 2012	27 January 2016	PDP	
Yahaya Bello	Governor	27 January 2016	27 January 2024	APC	
Usman Ododo	Governor	27 January 2024	Incumbent	APC	

== See also ==
- States of Nigeria
- List of state governors of Nigeria
