= Okun people =

Yoruba subgroup found in Kogi State

Okun
Total population
- 804,945 (2011)

Regions with significant populations
- Kogi State - 804,945 · Ijumu : 137,790 · Yagba West : 162,570 · Yagba East : 171,530 · Kabba/Bunu : 167,980 · Lokoja (50%): 114,235 · Mopa - Muro : 50,840

Related ethnic groups
- Èkìtì, Àkókó, Ìgbómìnà, Other Yoruba people

The Okun people are the Yoruba speaking people found majorly in Kogi, but with settlements in Kwara, Ekiti, and Ondo states of Nigeria. Their dialects are generally classified in the Northeast Yoruba language (NEY) grouping. They are collectively called "Okun", which in Okun dialects could be used to mean "Sorry", "Well-done", or as an all-encompassing greeting. Similarly, this form of greeting is also found among the Ekiti, Ijesha and Igbomina groups of Yoruba people.

This identity, which was probably first suggested by Eva Kraft-Askari during a 1965 field expedition, has gained wide acceptance among the indigenous Yoruba people and scholars. The individual Okun subgroups share some historical and linguistic affinity, but still maintain individual peculiarities. "Okun" therefore refers to the distinct, but culturally related Owé, Ìyàgbà, Addé, Gbẹdẹ, Bùnú or Abunu, Ikiri, and Òwòrò peoples, who together are said to make up 20% of the Kogi State population, according to the highly controversial 2006 National population census. It is also said that their indigenous food is Pounded yam and Egusi soup.

== History ==
The individual historical accounts that state that the Okun people migrated from Ile-Ife is very popular and highly accepted among the people. In the version of Yagba oral tradition for instance, the man who led a group of people to their present location was sent from Ile-Ife to establish the settlement but did not return over a long period to give an account of his expenditure. When he eventually returned and explained that he lost a larger part of his acquired land to some other migrants, he was blamed for the loss. He responded thus in Yoruba, Ìyà àgbà ló jemí, the clause from which the name Iyagba or Yagba was coined.

However, Ade Obayemi posited that the Okun people are aboriginals in the Niger-Benue confluence and may not have migrated to their present location from Ile-Ife. Based on the above the history of the Okun people can be viewed on epochal basis. The first set of people might have been the aboriginal people who lived in rockshelters such as Itaakpa and Ogbogba hill in Iffe - Ijumu, Udeniwu mountain in Ayere and Ohura hill in Bunuland. This group of people were eventually met on ground when migrants from Oyo - Ile or Ile - Ife wandered into Okunland. Thus, the peopling of Okunland is multifaceted and cannot be accounted for on the basis of the migrants from Ile - Ife alone. The turn of events that followed the Nupe military incursion of the 19th century left the Okun people as minorities in the Northern Region of Nigeria, separated from their relatives in the southwest.

== Archaeology ==
Archaeological evidence implies that the Okun people may be native to their territory and linked to the Proto-Yoruba group who lived to the west of the Niger River, contradicting the Ile Ife migration legends.

At Ogidi-Ijumu, archaeological evidence from open sites and rock shelters revealed that the region had been inhabited since the Late Stone Age (LSA) of West Africa, circa 2000 BC. A comparable dating technique was used to date the Ogidi-Ijumu archaeological site. The shelter excavated had pottery and stone tools (largely quartz) which were examined and contrasted with comparable discoveries from other sites in the area, especially Iffe-Ijumu. Tubi (2020) created a chronological framework for the site by analysing the features and technological complexities of the artefacts and concluded that the artefacts are part of the Ceramic Late Stone Age tool kits, which have been dated to approximately 300–400 BC; while the general area is dated to 2000 BC.

Similar evidence, including artefacts from the Ceramic Stone Age, which dates to between 300 and 400 BC, was discovered in Iffe-Ijumu. The date from Itaakpa has been used extensively as one of the few pieces of evidence of the transition from the Stone Age economy to Sedentary lifestyle in Nigeria. Thus from an Archaeological perspective, the Okun people have been inhabiting their present locale from the Stone Age period till now.

== Geographical location and settlements ==
Okun land is located within longitude 5° 30' to 7°15' East and latitude 7°15' to 3°45'. They occupy the Niger-Benue confluence area along with the Southern Nupe, Kakanda, Ebira (Panda and Koto), Gbagyi and Igala. To the west of Okun land are the Igbomina and Ekiti Yoruba subgroups.

Historically, Okun people lived in small social-political units with unfixed political boundaries that allowed social, cultural and commercial interaction. Till date, villages of hundreds or a few thousand people are scattered all over Okun land. Okun people are spread across six local government areas in Kogi State, namely: Kabba-Bunu, Yagba-West, Yagba-East, Mopa-Muro, Ìjùmú and Lokoja local government Areas. Settlements include Mopa, Ogidi, Ayetoro Gbede, Okedayo, Odo Ere, Ife, Egbe, Iyara, Iyamoye, Odoape, Ekinrin-Adde, Kabba, Isanlu, Obajana, Ikoyi, Agbaja.

== Language ==
Okun people speak varied Yoruba dialects such as; Ikiri, Gbede, Owé, Ìyàgbà, Addé, Bùnú and Ọwọrọ which are mutually intelligible to a great extent. Most Okuns also speak Standardized Yoruba. In recent times, there have been efforts into standardizing and reconciling the Okun dialects into a single language that is intelligible to all. The most notable of these efforts is the Okun Bible translated and published by the Bible Society of Nigeria in 2022.

== Writing System ==
The writing system adopted by the Bible Society of Nigeria in producing the translated Okun Bible is based on the modified Latin Yoruba writing script with few exceptions as exemplified in older Okun writings. There is a difference in the manner in which the orthography is written in comparison with the traditional Yoruba and the orthography and phonological system used. In traditional Yoruba, the /ɣ/ sound expressed as "Gh" in Okun writing does not exist. In addition, the Okun Bible excludes the use of /ʃ/ despite some sub-dialects having this sound represented.

The full orthographical system used by the Okun Bible translators is expressed below:

A B D E Ẹ F G GB GH H I J K L M N O Ọ P R S T U Y

Example Sentences
English	Okun dialect	Modern Standard Yoruba
The man who planted maize	Okunrin nghò gbẹ agbado	Okunrin to gbin agbado
I sang yesterday	Mò kerin li anọ	Mo kọrin li ana
Leave me!	Jẹ mi hi[lẹ]!	Fi mi silẹ!
I forgot to tell you (pl)	Mo hogbe ati wi ghọn ghin	Mo gbagbe lati so fun yin

== Culture ==
The various Okun groups share similar dressing, cuisine, traditional religion, masquerading culture etc. The men practised farming and hunting while the women took care of the home and raised the children. Crops cultivated included coffee, cocoa, yams, cassava, maize, sorghum, groundnuts, beans, and cotton. The Abunu women (and to a lesser extent, their Owe and Ọwọrọ neighbours) were known for the weaving and trade of Aso-Ipo, a red textile used in the burial of the wealthy and for making masquerade dresses. This textile was also an object of trade for the Abunu women to their Ebira neighbours and others.

The Okun people practice Christianity, Islam and traditional African religions. Although Okun people practice the worship of Orisa like Sango and Ogun and the consultation of Ifá (or Ihá) as the other larger Yoruba subgroups, prominence is given to the worship of ebora, believed to be spirits who live in forests, caves, mountains, stream or rivers. Okun people share similar masquerading cultures and these masquerades (egungun or egun) are said to represent ancestral spirits. Although there are masquerades such as the Epa masquerade that are similar to those found among other Yoruba groups, Ina-oko, Onigabon, Ouna and the likes of other masquerades that are ubiquitous in Okun land are not found among the other Yoruba groups but rather found to be similar to those of some non-Okun inhabitants of the Niger-Benue confluence like the Bassa Nges. While the Egungun cult groups are almost exclusive for men, women also had their group called Ofosi (Ohosi in Oworo). Ofosi women spoke a language that was not intelligible locally and were believed to be able to call people home from whatever location by mystical means.

Until the advent of the Nupes in the 19th century, each of the Okun subgroups lacked any form of central government but was organised into small city-states. Each 'state' was governed by leadership rotated amongst the constituent lineages or clans. The central kingship system has led to the establishment of royal stools such as Obaro of Kabba, Olubunu of Bunu, Olujumu of Ijumu, Agbana of Isanlu, Olu of Ọwọrọ. The Obaro of Kabba, Oba Michael Olobayo (Obaro Ero Il), is the chairman of the Okun traditional council.

In the early 20th century the Olu of Ọwọrọ (and head of Ọwọrọ district) was given a supervisory role over non-Okun districts of Kakanda, Kupa and Eggan while the Obaa ro of Kabba had a supervisory role over the other Okun people. Kabba which was used as the administrative and military base of the Nupe expedition, became the capital of the Kabba province of the Northern region and remains the largest and most important town of the Okun people. Despite the similarities pointed out, there are yet identifiable differences in the culture of the various Okun subgroups. Some of these differences can be noticed in language, political arrangements, social institutions and the array of ebora (deities) worshipped.

=== Cuisine ===
The Okun people are known to have delicacies. Soups include ora soup (ground dried okra), akuku, and tankelekon soup. These are usually eaten with pounded yam. A popular snack is called adun (fried beans with palm oil and sugar).

== Political struggle ==
Before the creation of Kogi state on 27 August 1991, Okun Yoruba people were in Kwara state alongside some of their Ekiti and the Igbomina neighbours. The perceived continual marginalization of the Okun people in Kogi state has made them call for the creation of a state and propose that it be made part of the southwest geopolitical zone of Nigeria, or the excision of Okun dominated districts/communities from the present Kogi state and addition to a South Western state, with preference for Ekiti.

== Notable people ==
- Pius Adesanmi
- Smart Adeyemi
- S. A. Ajayi
- Seth Sunday Ajayi
- Gbenro Ajibade
- Darey Art Alade
- Ibiyinka Alao
- Etannibi Alemika
- Sammy Ameobi
- Shola Ameobi
- Tolulope Arotile
- Prof Dapo Folorunsho Asaju
- Sunday Awoniyi
- John Olatunde Ayeni
- Sunday Bada
- Yetunde Barnabas
- TY Bello
- Tunde Baiyewu
- Joseph Abiodun Balogun
- Nike Davies-Okundaye
- Hon Abiodun Faleke
- Jaywon
- David Jemibewon
- Samuel Jemigbon
- Eyitayo Lambo
- Dino Melaye
- Prof Olufemi Obafemi
- John Obaro
- Tunde Ogbeha
- Bayo Ojo
- Jide Omokore
- Cardinal John Onaiyekan
- Juwon Oshaniwa
- WizzyPro
