= MOPA =

MOPA, Mopa, MoPA, may refer to:

== Places ==
- Mopa, Goa, India; a village
  - Mopa Airport (Manohar International Airport)
- Mopa, Nigeria; a town in Mopa-Muro, Kogi State
  - Mopa-Muro, Kogi, Nigeria; a local government area
- Mopa Breweries, Mopa, Mopa-Muro, Kogi, Nigeria; a Nigerian brewery

== Groups, organizations ==
- Ministry of Parliamentary Affairs (Pakistan) (MoPA)
- Ministry of Public Administration (MOPA), Bangladesh
- Museum of Performing Arts, Perth (MOPA), Western Australia, Australia
- Museum of Photographic Arts (MOPA), San Diego, California, USA
- MoPA Animation School (MoPA), Arles, France; Ecole MoPA having many students winning Student Academy Awards

== Other uses ==
- Master oscillator power amplifier, a type of laser system
- mopa, a method of species distribution modelling
- Month of Photography Asia, Singapore; a festival
- Most Outstanding Performance Award (MOPA) at the World Popular Song Festival
- Mopa Dean, musician at CIUT-FM, University of Toronto, Toronto, Ontario, Canada

== See also ==
- mopa-mopa tree, used in Colombian handicrafts
- Ministry of Public Administration and Security (MOPAS), South Korea
- Mopah (disambiguation)
