= New Yam Festivals in Nigeria =

Yam Festival
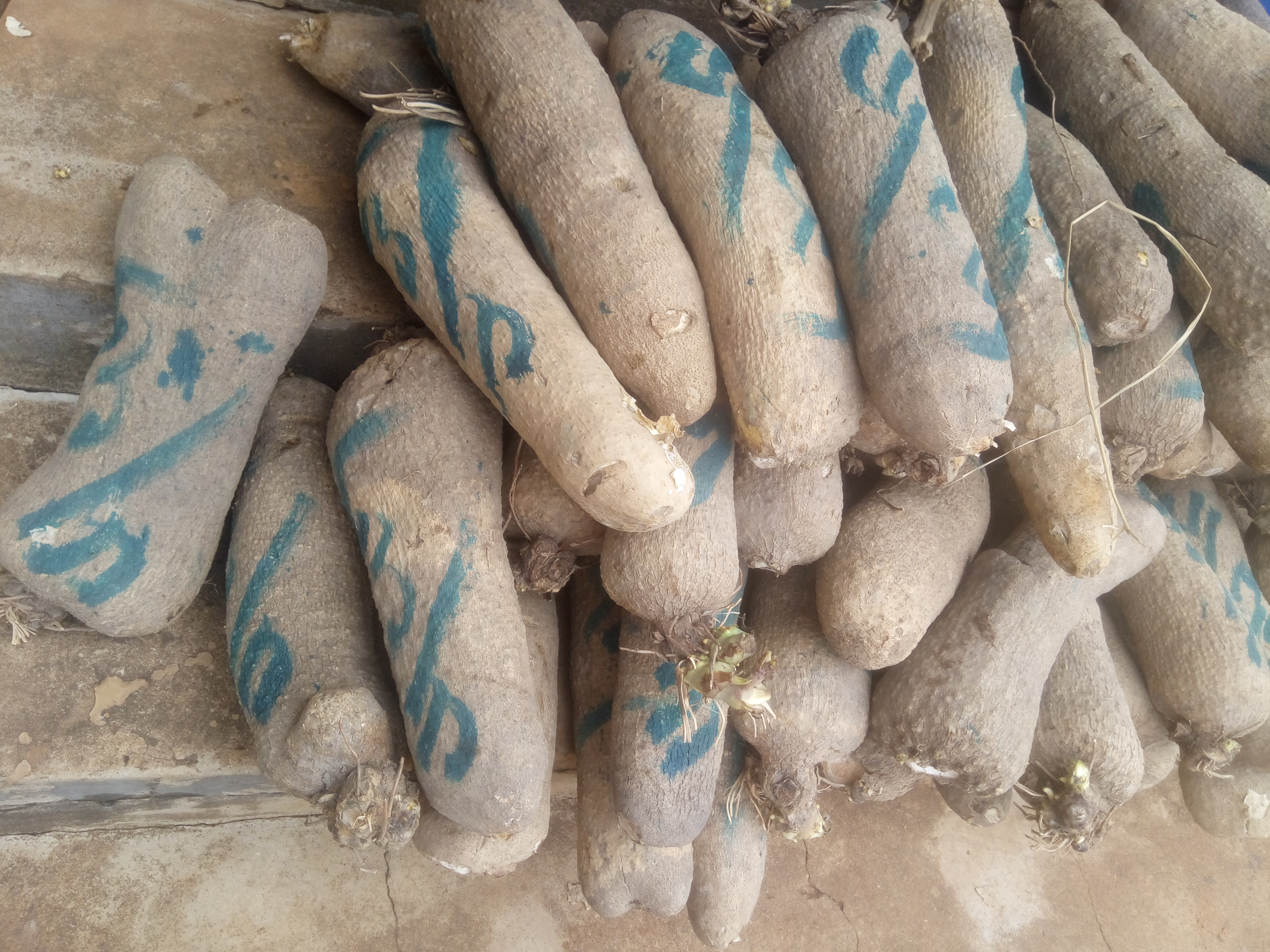
- Country: Nigeria

Yam is a staple food in West Africa and other regions classified as a tuber crop and it is an annual or perennial crop. The New Yam festival is celebrated by almost every ethnic group in Nigeria and is observed annually at the end of June.

== History ==
Historically, yam was a major crop or the most important crops in Nigeria as it is grown in mostly all the states, and is considered a marker of wealth. Yam is one of the major foods accepted as bride price when a man is seeking for a woman's hand in marriage. Yams are annual crops, although they are sometimes regarded as perennial crops due to their life cycle. Therefore, New Yam Festival is celebrated annually, after new yams are harvested. It is said to be a taboo to eat the new Yam before the celebration as it is a means of pleasing and appealing to the gods and spirit of harvest and god of the Earth and thanking them for a bountiful harvest. By so doing, the gods will be happy and will bring a better harvest in the new season.

The new yam festival is historically recorded to be prominent among the Igbo people of Nigeria. Among the peoples of West Africa, “none is so dedicated to the cultivation of yams as the Igbo, and the crop is one of their most important religious cults”, and noted the importance of the New Yam Festival among the Igbo." Earliest documentation of the New Yam Festival among the Igbo people dates back to the 1800s.

In Benin, Nigeria, brief reports on the New Yam Festival as held in Benin centuries ago have survived: these are quoted by ROTH (1903: 76) writing shortly after the destruction of the Kingdom of Benin. The first of these states that the ceremony was held at the beginning of the yam harvest, the king is presented with an earthenware pot, containing soil, and an old yam (i.e. one from the previous season) which he plants in the pot. During the dancing and merrymaking that follow, this pot is surreptitiously replaced by a similar one, containing a well developed new yam, which is later presented to the people, presumably as a sign of the king’s magical powers over the crops. The increase in size between the two tubers is held to indicate the magnitude of the harvest that may be anticipated.

== Celebrants ==
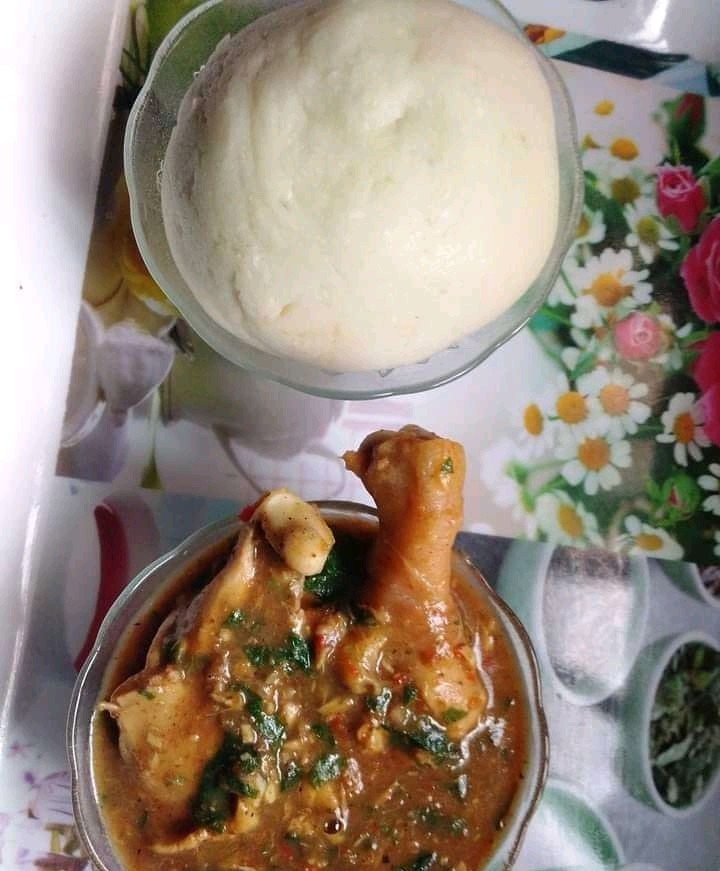
Pounded yam with soup

- Igbo: The Igbos been the prominent celebrant of the New yam festival in whole of west Africa which they call iwaji, ịrị jị or ivejioku also spelled ifejioku. According to Coursey, of all People of West Africa, none is so devoted to New yam festival as the Igbos. One of the earliest account of new yam festival among the Igbo people dates back to the 1800s. They hold the festival at the beginning of each harvest of new yam (Iri ji) or Onwa Asaa (seventh month). The purpose of the festival is to thank God for a bountiful harvest especially for the Yams and no one is expected to have a taste of the new yam before the festival as it is considered a taboo. The festival is very important to the Igbos and is celebrated each year. The festival serves as a season where indigenes of the town return home to re-unite themselves with their loved ones and enjoy together.
- Okpe Kingdom: According to the Okpe tradition as early as 6:30 am the inhabitants of the land both indigenes and non-indigenes gather at the palace of the Olopke of Okpe to pay him homage and wish him and his family well wishes. It begins with a 13 days notice to the entire town after deliberation between the King and his chiefs. The notice elapses at 5am on the thirteenth day. The festival is called Wasigbeenile, meaning ‘Thank You For Taking Care Of Me. Strangers and women who had suffered still birth around that period are banned from attending the ceremony. The ritual kicks off officially after the king emerges from the inner chamber of his palace clad in an all white attire and joined his chief who are also dressed in all white attire. The king leads a procession with the chiefs amidst drumming and dancing from the palace to the village square. The procession takes about 90 minutes to arrive the village square and a lengthy prayer is said for the well-being of all children of the land both home and abroad. the procession returns to the palace for a "pounded yam eating ceremony". The festival is an age old tradition and a way of thanking God for taking care of the people.
- Yoruba people, especially the Ifes, Okuns, Ekitis and other groups, including:
  - Ife New Yam Festival. Harvesting of New Yam normally occurs during July and August of every year.
  - Ado Ekiti
  - Ikere Ekiti
  - Ilara-Mokin
  - Emure
  - Ekinrin-Adde Community
  - Ogidi Community
- Nollywood New Yam Festival - Abuja

== Communities ==
=== Okpe Kingdom ===
Okpe is a town located at Akoko-Edo local council in Edo state. The town is known for its vast celebration of the new yam festival, which holds every July in the town. At about thirteen days to the festival, Olokpe (the King) and his Chiefs who are the committee members for the festival notify the community about new improvements or deductions to the festival. After this, the King sends his greetings to the whole kingdom through the gunshots which are heard far and near by the people. The sounds carry the message ‘Wasigbeenile’, which means, ‘thank you all for taking good care of me in this outgoing year”. The people then greet themselves with this word throughout day.

On the first day of the ceremony, people visit the palace with gifts such as assorted bush meat, goats, yam tubers etc. as a mark of respect for the king's throne. On the main day, the King and his chiefs come out of the palace dressed in white attires. They visit four Shrines (called the Ancestral spots) to offer prayers and blessings for a better harvest and more productive years. The ceremony continues later at the town square with a speech to address the town issues given by the Olokpe as well as other guests and reputable individuals from the town.

=== Nollywood New Yam Festival - Abuja ===
Abuja, the Capital of Nigeria, lies in the central part of Nigeria, in Federal Capital Territory (FCT). During its New yam festival celebrations, which is celebrated with the Igbo festival, it is said that yam is one of the ways of measuring a man's wealth. During the festival, different types of yams are served to people with different sauce to celebrate. Popular amongst this celebration in the Federal capital is the annual Nollywood New Yam Festival & Awards, now rebranded as Nollywood Cultural Heritage Festival and currently in its 12th edition set for November, 2024.

=== Ikere Ekiti ===
Ikere, in Ekiti State, south western Nigeria, celebrates the yam festival annually. The festival is called Odun Ijesu in Yoruba (Festival of eating yam) and it is done to thank orisha for the fertility of the land and for crowning their efforts in the previous planting season. The festival is a colorful one as the drums are rolled out with singers, dancers and prayers for the Ogoga, the King of the town, who is known as the harbinger of good fortunes for Ikere, to enjoy a long reign and for the town to witness greater development. Many activities are held including hunting, gun firing and the display of all the crowns worn by the Oba. The Oba always dresses in traditional clothing known as Aso Oke, with his white crown, while the Oloris (King's wives) are adorned with various beads and they dance before the King.

=== Ogidi ===
The Ogidi community is located in Ijumu, local government area of Kogi State. The town is known for the presence and formation of indigenous rocks. The town is popularly known for its agricultural produce, especially yams. In Ogidi, yams are considered miraculous plants that show fertility thus the period of plenty yam harvest signifies that other plants will flourish. All this culminates in the annual celebration of the Ogidi new yam festival. According to the people of Ogidi, new yam festival is celebrated to offer thanksgiving to God who gives increase and yield. It is celebrated in conjunction with the ogidi-Ela day which is the land's cultural day, which starts few days to the festival week. Different dance groups parade the community and hunters demonstrate gun firing to create awareness of the festivities in the community. The festival is celebrated for one week with several activities such as cultural performances, presentation of new yams, chieftaincy investitures and awards. Other activities are free medical checkups, novelty match, Jumat service, excursion to the Oroke Oda mountain and a bonfire. The colorful festival always attracts tourists from neighboring communities and states such as Edo, Ekiti, Osun, Lagos etc. The festival begins with members of the community marching to the Ogidi community ground where the ceremony takes place. People are adorned with beautiful attires that brighten the environment. The festival fully starts when the King, Rabiu Oladimeji Sule (the Ologidi of Ogidi land), arrives the venue. His presence creates a special atmosphere as the crowd raise their voices with cheer. When the Ologidi arrives, different groups are allowed to pay respect with the Olokoro/Olu-Otun group first then the Orotas and others follow. After the groups, everyone present follows to pay their respect. Also, Masquerade performances occur from the Igbabolelimin masquerade (masquerade from the spirit world), Egungun Oniye (masquerade with feathers), Igunnuko masquerade, Agbo Olode masquerade, as well as performance from the Geledes (humans wearing masks) Various dishes are shared during the festival so the people will remain active and lively.
