= Ayeni =

Ayeni may refer to:

- Adekunle Ayeni, Nigerian public relations practitioner, journalist, trained scientist and businessman
- Bosun Ayeni (born 1978), Nigerian footballer
- John Olatunde Ayeni (born 1967), Nigerian lawyer, investor and business magnate
- Kayode Ayeni (born 1987), American basketball player
- Phillip Ayeni (1949–2017), Navy Captain and first Administrator of Bayelsa State, Nigeria
