= Iyah-Gbede =

Town in Kogi State, Nigeria

Coordinates: 8°01′07″N 5°59′45″E

Iyáh-Gbẹdẹ, commonly known as Iyáh is a town located 20 km off of the Kabba-Ilorin federal highway, along the Ayegunle-Abuji Road. It is in Ijumu, a local government area of Kogi State, located in Nigeria.

== History ==
The original Iyáh settlement is believed to have been founded by Owa from Ile-Ife. The people of Iyáh-Gbẹdẹ have been renowned as great warriors from ancient times, particularly during the Nupe Wars of the 19th century.

The history of Iyáh-Gbẹdẹ began at the village's old site called Iyáh lókè, situated approximately 4 kilometers (4km) up the hill from the present settlement, and later grew into a large village with three main suburbs of Oke Meta' – Okeya, Okekiti and Ganran. The present settlement started with movement from Iyáh lókè circa 1965–1966 and was completed in 1985. The town's postal agency was officially opened on February 25, 1978.

On January 9, 2017, fifty-five-year-old Chief Ayeni Olusegun Williams, who hails from Iyáh-Gbẹdẹ, was elected as the 4th Olujumu of Ijumu Kingdom, following the demise of the previous Olujumu, the late Oba Jerome Sumonu, in 2014. The current Olu (king) of Iyáh-Gbẹdẹ, His Royal Highness Oba David Ibitayo Faleke, was crowned in July 2017. Iyah has had notable rulers, and Oba Phillip Jeminiwa Eleah, an Oba who reigned for over 40 years. He was famed for his wisdom and problem-solving insights among the Obas and leaders of thought throughout the Ijumu and Okun communities. Others include Oba Gideon Esemikose, Oba Olusegun, and Oba Alemede.

As part of efforts to document the history of the town, a book titled The Story of Iyah Gbẹdẹ has been written by Chief Sam Adejuwon Ayinmode. The town is also mentioned in the book The Okun People of Nigeria authored by John Otitoju.

== Geography ==
Iyáh-Gbẹdẹ is in Kogi West senatorial district and Kabba-Bunu/Ijumu federal constituency and is one of the Ten "Gbede" towns that consist of Ayegunle, Ayetoro, Agringbon-Oke gbede, Araromi gbede, Ayeh gbede, Iluafon gbede, Iluagba, Iddo, Iyáh gbede, Odokoro gbede, and Okoro gbede. The original inhabitants of Iyáh-Gbẹdẹ speak a local variant of Okun and Gbede, which are dialects of the Yoruba language.

Iyáh shares boundaries with Ayegunle Gbede and Ayetoro Gbede. The boundary between Iyáh and Ayetoro is delineated by Jemibewon International Academy, while the boundary with Ayegunle is located at a stream called "Omi Oso". The town’s layout reflects efforts in town planning, as no structures or buildings are allowed near the major road except those that comply with a setback of up to 3 meters from the main Abuji road. The town is well known for its palm wine. The town is also famous for its "Egungun Epa" annual masquerade festival, which is one of the tourist attractions in Kogi State.
