= Awoniyi =

Awoniyi is a Yoruba surname. Notable people with the surname include:

- Taiwo Awoniyi (born 1997), Nigerian footballer
- Sunday Awoniyi (1932–2007), Nigerian politician and tribal aristocrat
