= S. A. Ajayi =

Nigerian statesman

Chief S. A. Ajayi OFR
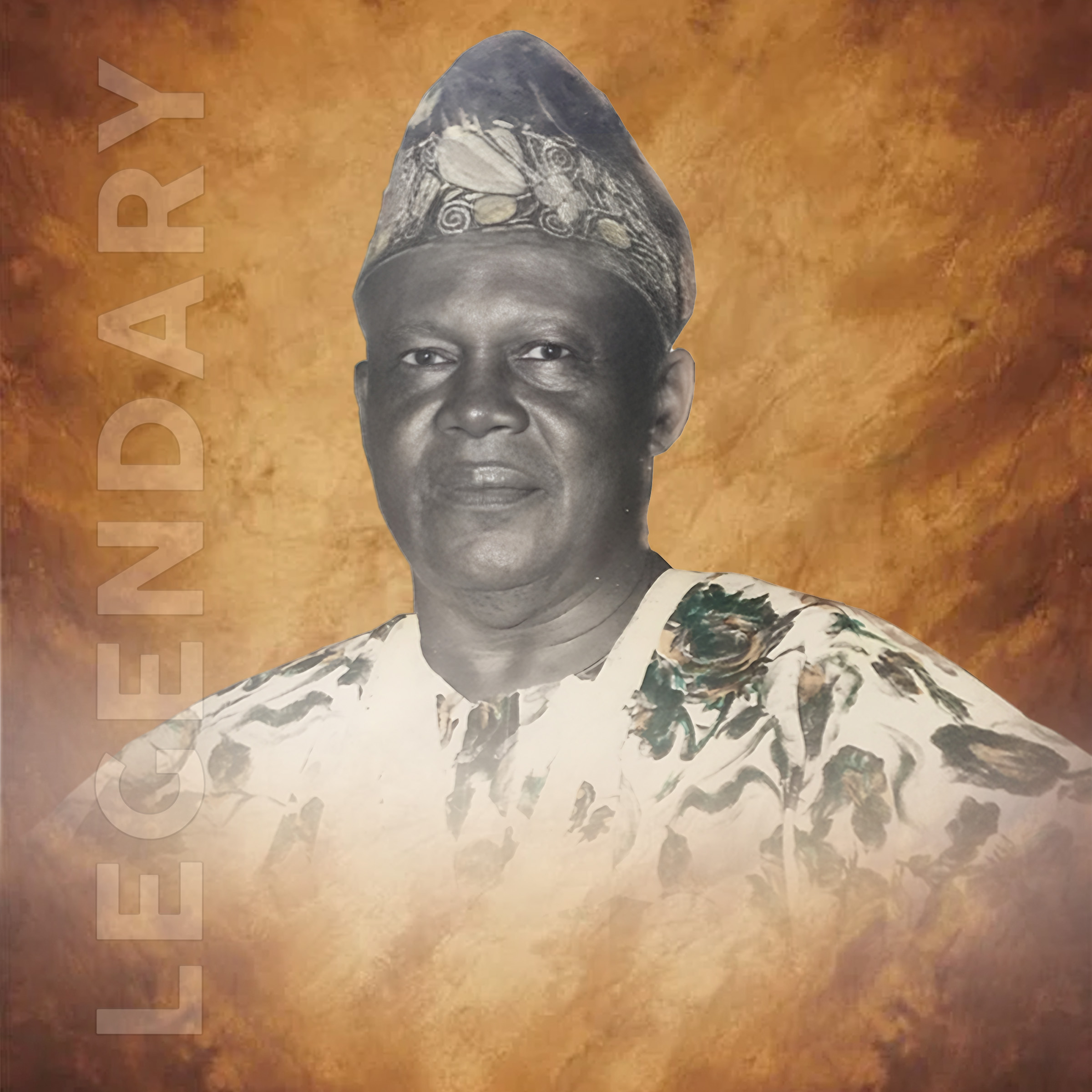

Regional Minister of State, for Forestry Affairs
- In office 1961–1966

Regional Minister of Local Government

Regional Minister for Education Acting
- In office 1963–1966
- Preceded by: Isa Kaita

Personal details
- Born: Samuel Aliyu Ajayi; 2 December 1910 Kabba Province, Northern Nigeria Protectorate (now Kogi State, Nigeria)
- Died: 11 May 1994 (aged 83) Kabba, Kogi State
- Resting place: St John's Anglican Church, Ogidi, Ijumu, Kogi State
- Party: Northern People's Congress

Chief S. A. Ajayi // OFR (2 December 1910 – 11 May 1994) was a Nigerian statesman who played an active role in the negotiations that led to Nigeria's independence. He was a pioneer politician of Okun land in the old Kabba province (in the present day Kogi State), who represented the people of Kabba Division in the Northern region house of Assembly. Chief Ajayi was passionate about educating his people therefore, He played a key role in the establishment of Kabba College of Agriculture, Division of Agricultural Colleges, The University of Northern Nigeria (now Ahmadu Bello University), the firm establishment of Kabba Teachers College now Federal Government Girls College Kabba but for the historic efforts of Chief Ajayi, the Northern Region Government had slated Kabba Teachers college for relocation to Kano, Chief Ajayi fought relentlessly to retain this citadel in Kabba division. The creation of Ijumu Division as an administrative headquarters (now, Ijumu, Local Government Area, Kogi State). was a burning desire for chief Ajayi, a move he started from 1960, unable to achieve this while in Government due to the unfortunate coup of 1966, Chief Ajayi pursued this vision with equally passionate illustrious sons of Ijumu until the Local Government was created.

== Early life and education ==
Ajayi was born on 2 December 1910 in Kabba Province, in the Northern Nigeria Protectorate, present-day Ogidi, Ijumu, Kogi State, Nigeria. In 1925, Ajayi enrolled into Ovim Central School, Okigwe Division of the old Eastern Region, for his primary school education. From 1930 to 1936, he attended Etinan Institute, Akwa Ibom and Ibadan Grammar School, for his secondary school education. He then went to CMS Teachers School, Coal Camp, Enugu to gain more knowledge in education and study to become a teacher. After his education, he moved to Enugu, where he taught at Christ Church School, Enugu and later at St. David's Kudeti, High School, Ibadan, before returning home in 1939 to join the Public Works Department as a career civil servant. He started as a Road Inspector for P.W.D in the Kabba Native Authority and rose to become an Inspector of works in 1953, after he was transferred outside his province. He retired from civil service in 1954.

== Political career ==
In 1954, Ajayi returned to Kabba Province and joined the Northern People's Congress, where he later rose to become the vice president of the party in Kabba Province. In 1955, he was elected councillor in the Kabba Native Administration and a year later, he won a seat in the Northern House of Assembly, and became a member of the regional executive council as minister of state for forestry affairs. He was appointed acting minister for education in 1963, in the absence of Isa Kaita, He was also appointed minister for Local Government affairs During his time in the Northern House of Assembly, he was appointed parliamentary secretary to the Premier of Northern Nigeria, Ahmadu Bello from 1957 to 1960. He was among the delegate that negotiated Nigerian Independence at the Lancaster House Conferences in London and led the Northern Nigeria Delegation to London for the Negotiation and Launching of VC-10 Nigeria Airways. He was a member of Nigeria Economic Mission to West Germany and was a minister till their government was overthrown by the military coup on January 15, 1966. During Shehu Shagari's administration, he was appointed to the first board of directors of National Insurance Corporation of Nigeria (NICON).

== Honours ==
In 1965, the president of Nigeria, Nnamdi Azikiwe, conferred him with the Officer of the Order of the Federal Republic, (OFR). He was installed as the Oluwole of Ijumuland, as well as the Balogun and the Bajito of Ogidi-Ijumu. He was honoured with the National President Ogidi Development Union, President Ijumu Development Movement and National Vice Patron, Ijumu Student Union, a recognition for Ogidi-Ijumu men with significant accomplishments.

== Personal life ==
Ajayi married many wives and gave birth to many children. He was a born-again Christian and was honoured with Baba Egbe Akorin and Baba Ijo in St John's Anglican Church Ogidi, Ijumu.

== Death and legacy ==
He died on 11 May 1994 in Kabba, Kogi State and was buried in St John's Anglican Church, Ogidi, Ijumu, Kogi State, a church he built.

The S. A Ajayi foundation was established in continuation of his legacy and ideology of awarding scholarships to deserving students. From 1970, he has been awarding scholarships to students, from primary to university level and hundreds of students were awarded.
