= 1992 Nigerian Senate elections in Kogi State =

1992 Nigerian Senate election in Kogi State

The 1992 Nigerian Senate election in Kogi State was held on July 4, 1992, to elect members of the Nigerian Senate to represent Kogi State. Ahmed Tijani Ahmed representing Kogi Central, Sunday Awoniyi representing Kogi West and Ahmadu Ali representing Kogi East all won on the platform of the National Republican Convention.

== Overview ==
Affiliation	Party		Total
Affiliation	SDP	NRC	Total
Before Election			3
After Election	0	3	3

== Summary ==
District	Incumbent	Party	Elected Senator	Party
Kogi Central			Ahmed Tijani Ahmed	NRC
Kogi West			Sunday Awoniyi	NRC
Kogi East			Ahmadu Ali	NRC

== Results ==
=== Kogi Central ===
The election was won by Ahmed Tijani Ahmed of the National Republican Convention.

1992 Nigerian Senate election in Kogi State
Party	Candidate	Votes	%
NRC	Ahmed Tijani Ahmed		
Total votes			
NRC hold			

=== Kogi West ===
The election was won by Sunday Awoniyi of the National Republican Convention.

1992 Nigerian Senate election in Kogi State
Party	Candidate	Votes	%
NRC	Sunday Awoniyi		
Total votes			
NRC hold			

=== Kogi East ===
The election was won by Ahmadu Ali of the National Republican Convention.

1992 Nigerian Senate election in Kogi State
Party	Candidate	Votes	%
NRC	Ahmadu Ali		
Total votes			
NRC hold			
