= Ezekiel Ikupolati =

Anglican bishop in Nigeria

Ezekiel Ikupolati is a former Anglican bishop in Nigeria.

Ikupolati was born in Iyara on 6 June 1948. He was educated at the Emmanuel College of Theology and Christian Education, Ibadan. A former soldier, he was ordained in 1984. He served in the Dioceses of Kwara and Lokoja. He was then the Dean of the Church's seminary in Okene until his appointment as the Anglican Diocese of Ijumu in 2008. He retired in 2018.
