= Mopah =

Mopah may refer to:

- Mopah International Airport, Merauke, South Papua, Indonesia
- Mopah Range (the Mopahs), San Bernardino County, California, USA; a mountain range

== See also ==
- MOPA (disambiguation)
