= Mopa Breweries =

Nigerian brewery

Mopa Breweries, Ltd. is a Nigerian brewery founded in 1980 by Chief J. Adewale Bello in Kogi State, Nigeria. The brewery is based in the town of Mopa in the Mopa-Muro Local Government Area. In 2005, the Canadian company Alexus-NextGen bought a controlling interest.

== Beers ==
The company produces One Lager, a popular lager, Lion Stout, and non-alcoholic malt beverages.

== See also ==
- Consolidated Breweries
- Guinness Nigeria
- List of beer and breweries in Nigeria
- Nigerian Breweries
