= Lancaster House Conferences (Nigeria) =

The Lancaster House Conferences in London in 1957 and 1958 were meetings where the federal constitution for an independent Nigeria was prepared. The meetings were presided over by the British Colonial Secretary, and Nigerian delegates were selected to represent each region and to reflect various shades of opinion. The delegation was led by Abubakar Tafawa Balewa of the Northern People's Congress (NPC), and included party leaders Obafemi Awolowo of the Action Group, Nnamdi Azikiwe of the NCNC, Eyo Ita of the NIP (National Independence Party), Ahmadu Bello and S. A. Ajayi of the NPC – as well as the premiers of the Western, Eastern, and Northern regions. The Chiefs of the Northern Region, Sir Muhammadu Sanusi, Emir of Kano and Alhaji Usman Nagogo, Emir of Katsina' Chiefs of the Western Region, Sir Adesoji Aderemi and Oba Aladesanmi; and Chiefs of the Eastern Region HRH Eze Johnson Osuji Njemanze MBE CON, Paramount Ruler of Owerri, Chief Nyong Essien of Uyo and Chief S. E. Onukogu
