= Oworo people =

Subgroup of the Yoruba people

The Ọwọrọ ethnic nationality represents a group of people around the Niger-Benue confluence speaking a Yoruba dialect called Oworo. They are generally classified as part of Northeast Yoruba (NEY) of the Yoruba people.

== Origin ==
The origin of the Oworo people by oral tradition is linked to three brothers who left Ile-Ife to hunt around the present-day Oworo Land. The successful adventure caused them to name the place "owo mi ro", which means "my hands are full of blessings". Another legend called Ako meaning "meeting", says that people came from several locations to converge on the present-day Oworo land. This legend accommodates the group (clans) of Oworo that claim not to be of Ife provenance, but rather an aboriginal Yoruba stock. Ade Obayemi, however was of the opinion that the ancestors of the Okun people, the Northeast Yoruba people including; Abinu (Bunu), Owe, Ijumu, Ikiri, Iyagba and Oworo located in Kogi State did not migrate from Ile-Ife but are aboriginal to the Niger-Benue Confluence area.

Europeans, like Temple O., who made early contact and wrote about the Oworo people referred to them in their writings as 'Aworo'.

== Traditional institutions ==
The Oworos live in several small towns ruled by various kings, including:

- The Olu of Oworo (1st Class)
- The Olu Apata of Apata
- Bajana of Obajana
- Ohiribo-Keta of Karara
- Maasi of Agbaja
- Obadofin of Tajimi
- Obaro of Emu
- Baalo of Oyo Iwaa
- Eleson of Iwaa/Amogbe
- Okatama of Jamata
- Ogidiga of Ohono
- Obadofin of Oshokoshoko
- Obayelu of Ogbabon
- Obaro of Omuwa
- Obaro of Jakura
- Elesho of Felele

== Language ==
Ọwọrọ people speak a dialect of Yoruba, linguistically similar to other Okun dialects. Virtually all Oworos can fluently communicate in Yoruba. They can as well converse to a great extent with speakers of other Okun dialects since the languages are mutually intelligible. In addition to speaking Oworo, those in the eastern axis can also speak Igbira Igu (Egbura).

== Geography ==
Ọwọrọland is located on western bank of River Niger by the Niger-Benue Confluence and bounded to the north by Igbira Igu (Egbura), northwest by Kakanda, west by the Abinu and to the south by Ebira land. It is a mountainous terrain. A number of Ọwọrọ communities are on the Agbaja Plateau. Some Oworo towns and Villages includes Agbaja, Jamata, Obajana, Tajimi, Emu, Jakura, Omuwa, Otada, Agbodo, Adamogu, Otuga, Gbonla-Odo, Aleke, Igaa, Ojigi, Owara Igaachi, Igbonla, Ogbabon, Gbande, Adogbe, Ijiho, Karara, Banda, Okonoke, Akpata, Oyo, Irimi, Gbaude, Iwaa, Osokosoko, Okomoba, Ogbongboro, and Felele (The northern suburb of Lokoja town).

== Culture and political structure ==
Ọwọrọ culture bears grave resemblance with those of Bunu, Ikiri, Yagba, Ijumu and Owe people who are together with the Ọwọrọ people referred to as Okun, the word used in greeting. Like the Bunu people, Ọwọrọ people were known for their bassa-like cat whisker marks. The women were known for weaving of a cloth called Arigidi, a cotton textile, and also weaved abata (aso ipo), a red textile used by Ọwọrọ, Owe and Bunu for the burial rights of important people. The men are traditionally hunters and farmer. Fishing is also practiced in the riverine communities of the eastern axis of Ọwọrọ land. The people practice Christianity, Islam and African traditional religion. Prominent among Ọwọrọ festivals is the Oluwo festival. It is a triennial festival of the worship of Olu-iho (the king of all holes) which is the Agbaja end of a 2km long natural tunnel. The advent of Christianity and Islam has reduced the importance and worship of several gods (ebora) and as well lessened the importance and observation of several egun or egungun festivals which have their roots in the worship of ancestral spirits.

Historically, Ọwọrọ was organised into cities states, with each state having her own leader. However, with the advent of Nupe hegemony, the central kingship system began in the 19th century, the first Olu being Olu Okpoto. The current Olu of Oworo is Alhaji Mohammed Baiyerohi.

== Mineral resources ==
Ọwọrọland is rich in mineral deposits. The major minerals include iron ore on the Agbaja Plateau, marble in Jakura and limestone in Oyo-Iwa Community. Dangote Group is currently exploring the limestone in Oyo-Iwa axis of Ọwọrọland in the production of cement in its Dangote Cement factory located at Obajana.
