= Arewa Consultative Forum =

North Nigeria cultural and political forum

- Abbreviation: ACF
- Founded: March 7, 2000
- Preceded by: Northern People's Congress
- Headquarters: Kaduna
- Political position: Centre-right

Website
- https://arewaconsultativeforum.org/

The Arewa Consultative Forum (ACF) is a Nigerian quasi-political and socio-cultural association which seeks to promote the political interest of people of northern Nigeria. The term arewa means 'northern' in Hausa, the primary language of the region. The forum is a successor to the Northern People's Congress, which collapsed after the coup of 1966. The forum is committed to democratic processes within the federal constitution.

== History ==
=== Origins ===
The forum originated from a meeting held on 7 March 2000 in Kaduna at the initiative of the Sultan of Sokoto, Alhaji Muhammadu Maccido. The purpose was to establish unity of Northern leaders, working through elected officials to achieve progress in the Arewa area within the democratic framework. In September 2000, former head of state General Yakubu Gowon agreed to act as chairman of the Board of Patrons of the forum. The forum appointed a retired Inspector General of the Nigerian Police, Alhaji Muhammadu Dikko Yusufu, as chairman. Belying its common image as a champion of the interest of the Muslims Hausa and Fulani, the ACF appointed Sunday Awoniyi, a Christian Yoruba from the northern state of Kogi, as chairman of the board of trustees in 2000, a position he held until his death in November 2007.

=== 2000 - 2009 ===
On 8 August 2001, the ACF announced that it was forming three teams to visit the 19 states of the North and Abuja, to be led by All People's Party (APP) leader Olusola Saraki, ACF Chairman M.D. Yusufu and Lt. Gen Jeremiah Useni. The goal was to meet and discuss common goals with state governors and other leaders. The group met a cool reception in Jos, Plateau State from members of the Middle Belt Forum, who felt that they would be marginalized in a forum dominated by northerners.

In August 2001, the forum recommended that former Heads of State, Generals Muhammadu Buhari, Ibrahim Babangida and Abdulsalami Abubakar defend themselves against allegations made against them at the Human Rights Investigations Commission, sitting in Abuja, and said the ACF was conducting an independent investigation. In December 2003, the new ACF chairman, Chief Sunday Awoniyi, said the forum would try to persuade Buhari, Babangida and Vice President Atiku Abubakar to resolve their differences for the sake of greater unity of northern leaders.

In March 2009, the ACF expressed concern over deteriorating liquidity in the banking industry and demanded that the Central Bank of Nigeria provide information on the size and origins of the problem.

=== Crisis over Yar'Adua illness ===
In late 2009, the illness of President Umaru Yar'Adua, the first Northern President in the Nigerian Fourth Republic, and the possibility of his vice-president Goodluck Jonathan from the South assuming power, became a contentious issue in the forum. On 16 December 2009, the forum issued a communiqué calling for further information on the health of the President, and saying that if a succession issue arose it should be resolved according to the constitution. Later that month, the ACF called on the President, then hospitalized in Saudi Arabia, to formally release a letter that would authorize the Vice President to temporarily assume the powers of the president in his absence.

In January 2010, a former secretary of the ACF and a retired colonel, Umaru Ali, asked the ailing president to resign so that his deputy could take over. In February 2010, the ACF said unequivocally that Yar'Adua should transfer power to Jonathan. Tanko Yakasai, former Liaison Officer to President Shehu Shagari and a founding member, quit the ACF due to the forum's statement. Tanko Yakassai has since returned to the ACF as a member of its board of trustees.

=== 2010 and onwards ===
In March 2010, the ACF rejected a statement by Libyan leader Muammar Gaddafi who had recommended a break-up of Nigeria along religious lines, saying he was ignorant of the diverse religious make-up of the country. The ACF condemned the recent killings in Plateau State, which had triggered Gaddafi's remarks, describing them as "senseless". That month the ACF formed a Political Committee headed by former Minister of State for Power and Steel, Mohammed Ahmed Gusau. The committee's goal was to set the ACF agenda ahead of the 2011 elections.

In December 2023, the ACF announced Mamman Osuman as its new chairman.
