= John Olatunde Ayeni =

Nigerian lawyer and businessman (born 1967)

John Ayeni CON
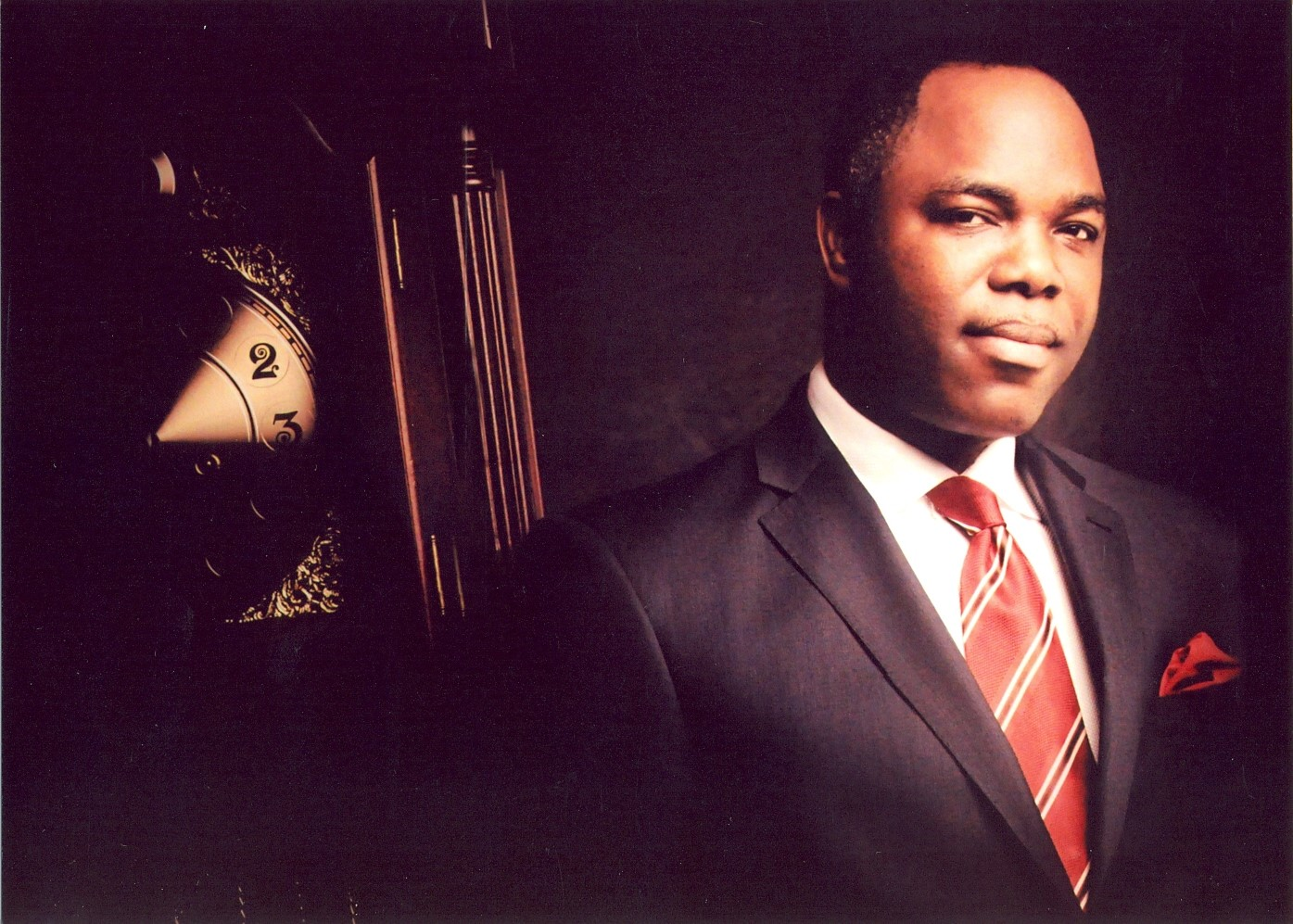
- Born: John Olatunde Ayeni; April 4, 1967 (age 59); Iyah-Gbede, Ijumu, Kogi State
- Occupations: Business Magnate, investor, philanthropist

John Olatunde Ayeni CON (born April 4, 1967) is a Nigerian lawyer and banker. He holds board positions on companies throughout Nigeria.

== Career ==
In 2011, Ayeni became chairman of Skye Bank now Polaris Bank Limited, which was formed in 2005 when five commercial banks (including Bond Bank, founded by Ayeni in 2000) merged to create a new entity with a balance sheet in excess of ₦1 trillion.

In 2007, Ayeni became majority stakeholder and vice chairman of ASO Savings & Loans. He is also a founding partner.

In 2013, as vice chairman of Integrated Energy Distribution and Marketing Ltd (IEDM), he led a successful bid to take control of the Ibadan and Yola Electricity Distribution Companies. This marked the first privatization of a national energy asset in Nigerian history. He is also chairman of JKK (Nigeria) Plc and Temple Resources Ltd, and sits on the boards of PPP Fluid Mechanics Limited and Hightech Procurement Limited.

Ayeni is an advocate of banking and trade reforms that will make doing business easier in Africa. He is widely acknowledged as a philanthropist, supporting various charitable organisations throughout Africa.

== Education ==
Ayeni had his secondary education at Baptist Secondary School, Iyah-Gbede in Ijumu, Kogi State between 1981 and 1985 followed by Kwara State Polytechnic, Ilorin, Kwara State. He obtained the General Certificate of Education (G.C.E.), Advanced Level papers in the year 1987.

In the same 1987, he was admitted to read law at Ahmadu Bello University, Zaria, Kaduna State. He graduated with honours in 1990 and was called to Bar in 1991.

Thereafter, he underwent and completed the compulsory National Youth Service Corps service with Professor S. A. Adesanya & Co., a firm of Legal Practitioners.

After the National Service in 1991, he worked with Rodco (Nig) Limited as the Legal Adviser from 1991 to 1994 after which he voluntarily left the company to start his own firm of Legal practice in 1994 - Legal Resources Alliance

== Languages ==
Ayeni is a native speaker of Okun, Yoruba, and is also fluent in English and Hausa.

== Professional memberships ==
- Nigerian Bar Association - A one time Vice Chairman of Ikeja branch and also a former Member of Council of Legal Aid Council.
- International Bar Association.
- Institute of Directors – In September 2014 he was conferred with the status of Fellow of the Institute of Directors Nigeria

== Recognition ==
In recognition of his contributions to the growth and development of the Nigerian economy, Nigeria's Achievers University awarded Ayeni the honorary title of Doctor of Science (D.Sc.) in business administration.

In September 2014, he was made Fellow by the Institute of Directors, Nigeria and the Commander of the Order of the Niger. He is happily married to Abiola and the marriage is blessed with three children.

== Philanthropy ==
Ayeni is founder of The Oluwatoyin Ayeni Educational Foundation, established in 1999. Every year, the foundation awards tertiary institution scholarships to 25 bright students from his hometown of Iyah-Gbede in Ijumu, Kogi State. He is also a trustee of Support our Troops Foundation, a not for profit military charity that supports and promote the interests of the men and women of the Nigerian Armed Forces who serve home and abroad.

== Sources ==
- John Olatunde Ayeni CON Linkedin (Profile), retrieved October 10, 2014
- Bloomberg Business Week (Profile), retrieved October 9, 2014
- Skye Bank Nigeria (Executive Profile), retrieved October 9, 2014
- Reuters (Brief Biography), retrieved October 13, 2014
