= Agbaja =

Locality in Kogi State, Nigeria

Coordinates: 7.9871°N 6.6425°E

Agbaja is the locality of a large iron ore deposit in Kogi State, central Nigeria.

== People ==
Agbaja is inhabited by the Oworo people who speak a dialect of Yoruba also called Oworo. Agbaja was the administrative capital of Oworo district during the colonial era and still remains the traditional and political capital of the Oworo people.

== Locale ==
It is located on a plateau about 300 km south of the capital Abuja, and more importantly about 70 km from the heavy-duty railway to the sea at Itakpe which is about 70 km to the south.

== Resource ==
The Licences contain magnetite to the extent of 2.0-3.3 billion tonnes of potential iron mineralisation grading in the range of 48% to 53% Fe.

== Timeline ==
=== 2011 ===
- Progress

== See also ==
- Railway stations in Nigeria
