= Mopa, Kogi State =

Town in Nigeria

Coordinates: 08°05′50″N 05°53′45″E

Mopa is a town in the Nigerian state of Kogi.

The name Mopa means "imo papo" in Yoruba, which implies people with same ideology. It is the headquarters of the Mopa-Muro Local Government Area of the state. Mopa is 95% Christian dominated, over 4.5% traditional believers, and the remaining fragment Muslims who are 99% outsiders living in Mopa. Local industries include Mopa Breweries, Boja Industries, BD Farms, and two marble quarries.

Mopa has a state-run Government Technical College, and several other colleges that were established and managed by the missionaries in conjunction with the Mopa community such as Ecwa Secondary School Mopa and Baptist Girl High School Mopa. Mopa also has a State College of Education located close to the technical college.

Mopa people speak their indigenous Yagba language, which is dialect of the Yoruba language. They are Okun people with strong cultural inclinations. They are organised into clans, including, the Iya Ode, Aribo, Omoe Age, Anunmade, Annumote, Iya Oto, Iya Mogbe, Omolokun, Arupe Dena, Iya Meleda, Momo-Hopa, Iya-Lojo, Iya Lere, and Iya Bgadi.

== Minerals ==
Kogi state is rich in solid minerals, having 32 minerals recorded in the state. Mopa, or Mopa-Moru area, is recorded as a source of Beryl, Cassiterite (tin), Clay, Columbite, Gold, Manganese, Mica, Sandstone (silica sand), Tantalite, and Tourmaline.

== History ==
Mopa is bound to the northeast by a hill. History has it that the Mopa people used to live on the northern side of the hill but later moved to the southern side so the hill could protect them from attacks by rival settlements to the north.

== Notable people ==
- Sunday Awoniyi, a Northern Nigerian Yoruba politician and tribal aristocrat as the Aro of Mopa in Kogi State. Sunday Awoniyi was a founder of the People's Democratic Party.
- Seth Sunday Ajayi, a Nigerian professor and scholar in wildlife conservation and environmental protection. First Professor in Wildlife and Fisheries in Africa.
