= Ayegunle Gbede =

Town in Kogi state, Nigeria

Ayegunle Gbede is a town in Ijumu local government in Kogi State in the Middle belt of Nigeria. It has the Postcode 261103 and GPS coordinates 7.85674 / 5.94916. It is 480 kilometers (300 mi) from Abuja and 260 kilometers (160 mi) from Lagos.

Ayegunle Gbede is in the North-Eastern part of Ijumu Local Government Area. It is the second largest and most populous town in Gbede land. It is a nodal town - five roads from different villages and towns intersect at the town. It shares common borders with Ayedayo Amuro, Ayeh Gbede, Ayetoro Gbede, Idoyi Bunu, Iyah Gbede, Iluhafon Gbede, and Oleh Bunu.

The inhabitants of the town speak their local dialect of Okun and Gbede, which is a Yoruba dialect. It is one of the seven “Gbede” towns that consist of Ayegunle, Aiyetoro, Araromi, Ayeh, Iyah, Odokoro, and Okoro.

== History ==
Ayegunle Gbede's migration to her present location started on 1 August 1927. On this date, the “Aku Mehan” or "nine communities", who were hitherto living scattered on separate lands agreed to come together, since there was need for communal protection from intruders who often invaded them. Their meeting point was under an “Ohon” or "orange" fruit tree which was central to all, for convenience.

On that day, the portion of land around the Ohon tree was cleared and agreed to be used as a market to be named Ohi-ona, shortened to Ohona, where they would meet every five days. The name "Ohi-Ona" (Ohona) was chosen because the land belonged to Ohi and Ona. Thereafter, residential plots were assigned for clearing. Issuance of economic trees such as palm trees, iroko and "awo" i.e. "mahogany" trees were also done by the Forestry Officers, Mr. Jacob Ojo, Rev. James Osadare Olorunyomi, and Olu Maiyaki Ibimodi of Igah Quarters.

On 16 August 1927, Rev. Olorunyomi went with Mr. Ojo to Olu Ibimodi at Igah village on the subject of the forest clearing that was required at Ohon Market. The following day, 17 August 1927, the previously separate villages began to clear the site of their new settlement around the Ohon Market Square in present Ayegunle Gbede.

On 6 September 1927, at a meeting conveyed by Rev. Olorunyomi which was held at Olu Ibimodi of Igah residence, attended by all the "Ijoyes" (Chiefs) of the nine villages, Christian heads and Muslim leaders, an irrevocable decision to continue with the clearing work at the resettlement site was taken. Igah people who hosted this meeting fed everyone present with pounded yam in twenty giant calabashes.

On 2 December 1927, the District Officer, Mr. P. G. Harris and his entourage in the presence of Chief (Oba) Elewa of Odda and a multitude of people who came to Ohi-Ona, measured and shared plots of land to all the uniting communities. On 31 January 1928, the name “Ayegunle Gbede’’ was adopted as the name of the combined community. Chief Osu Momodu Emetan of Akure made the proclamation. However, the market name Ohona persisted for years.

This name, derived from ‘Ohi-Ona’ was the name for a group of villages: Akure, Agbara, Okeleti, Iluesho, Agoh, Esseh, Eguru, Igah, and Ofede. On 16 February 1928, Bojuwon from Igah started his own house at the new settlement, closely followed by Olojo and Moraiyewa, the trio from Igah as cited in “The Baptist New Light–Pastoral and Community Development Work of Rev. James Osadare Olorunyomi by Pastor Seth Esan Olorunyomi”.

According to oral records, Okeleti Quarters was the first to move in group to the present Ayegunle Gbede due to the fire disaster that destroyed their buildings at the old Okeleti.
