= Anglican Diocese of Ijumu =

Anglican diocese in Nigeria

Coordinates: 07°51′00″N 05°57′00″E

The Anglican Diocese of Ijumu is one of eleven within the Anglican Province of Lokoja, itself one of 14 ecclesistical provinces within the Church of Nigeria. The bishop emeritus is the Rt. Rev. Ezekiel Ikupolati; and the current bishop is the Rt. Rev. Paul Olarewaju Ojo
