= Isa Kaita =

Nigerian politician (1912-1994)

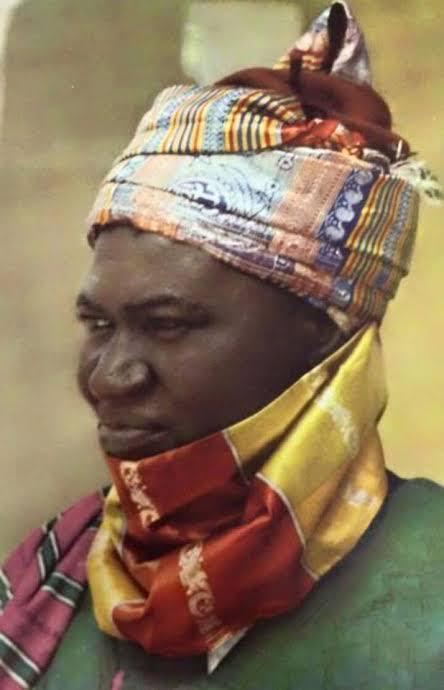

Regional Minister for Works
- In office 1954–1957
- Preceded by: Ahmadu Bello

Regional Minister for Education
- In office 1957–1966

Personal details
- Born: January 1912 Katsina
- Died: 26 November 1994 (aged 82) Kaduna
- Party: Northern People's Congress
- Profession: Teacher/Journalist/Administrator

Isa Kaita (January 1912 – November 1994) was a Nigerian politician. He went on to hold the chieftaincy titles of the Madawaki of Katsina and later, the Waziri of Katsina. Prior to joining politics, he was a broadcaster at the BBC.

In the 1950s and 1960s, he was a regional Minister for Works and Education in the Northern Region of Nigeria.

== Life and early career ==
Isa Kaita was born in Katsina to a noble royal family: his father, Mallam Haruna was the Waziri of the Katsina Emirate, a title he would later hold as well. He attended Katsina Primary School (later named Barewa College) and later went to the Katsina Training College. After completing his studies in 1922, he started teaching at the Katsina Middle School. He taught at the school for 19 years before quitting to become a radio announcer in 1941. He worked at Zoy radio station at the Radio House in Accra, Ghana. He joined the station during World War II and was known to have made broadcasts about related news items on the war. He left the radio station in 1944 to become a secretary to the emir of Katsina and the Katsina Native Authority. In 1948, he traveled to the UK to earn a diploma in public administration at Exeter University, London U.K

== Political career ==
His political career started when he won a seat to the Northern Region House of Assembly in 1951. He contested the seat under the political platform of the Northern People's Congress. Prior to the election, he was a founding member and prominent campaigner for the party, he was also the party's financial secretary. In 1954, he replaced Ahmadu Bello as the regional minister for Works while also serving at as the party's financial secretary. During the Nigerian First Republic, he was the regional minister for Education and was known to have strived to promote a progressive learning environment and enlightened educational policy. He was also an important adviser to Ahmadu Bello, the regional premier and a powerful political leader.

== Later career ==
After the proscription of political activities in 1966 Isa Kaita retired to Kaduna where he was involved as a board member in a few companies such as the United African Company and Chellarams. During the Shagari administration in the 1980s, he was chairman of the Code of Conduct Bureau. He was also a lobbyist for the creation of Katsina State. A sport enthusiasts, he was a patron of the Nigerian Fives Association and Nigerian polo. He was also an active member of several associations like the British/Nigerian association, Indie/Nigerian association, Jama'atul Nasrul Islam, Rotary club and so on.

He died at his residence in Kaduna on 26 November 1994.
