= Bosun Ayeni =

Nigerian footballer (born 1978)

Personal information
- Date of birth: 8 November 1978 (age 47)
- Place of birth: Lagos, Nigeria
- Height: 1.78 m (5 ft 10 in)
- Position: Midfielder

Senior career*
Years	Team	Apps	(Gls)
1995	V.I.P.		
1996–1997	Shooting Stars		
1997	Reggiana		
1998	Politechnica Timișoara	14	(0)
1998	Fidelis Andria	8	(0)
1998–2002	Lyngby BK	35	(1)
2002–2004	BK Frem	44	(2)
2004–2006	FC Nordsjælland	55	(0)
2007–2008	SønderjyskE	10	(0)
2007	→ AC Horsens (loan)	3	(0)
2009–2010	Christianshavn SC		
2010	Brønshøj BK		

International career
2001–2002	Nigeria	2	(0)
- * Club domestic league appearances and goals

Bosun Ayeni (born 8 November 1978) is a Nigerian retired professional football midfielder.

On 28 March 2008, he was fired from SønderjyskE after headbutting teammate Kenneth Fabricius twice.
