= Odo Ere =

Town in Nigeria

Coordinates: 8°15′N 5°33′E

Odo Ere, popularly called Ere Gajo, is the headquarters of Yagba West Local Government Area, Kogi State, Nigeria. The town is located in the old Kabba Province about 140 kilometres southeast of Ilorin. The people of Odo Ere share a common ancestry with the Yoruba people in South-West Nigeria and they are often referred to as Okun Yoruba people. The town is situated on a well-watered savannah plain consisting of dotted hills, forest and grassland. The topography earned the town the sobriquet: Ere Ọmọ Onilẹ Dun Rin, meaning "Odo Ere town with a beautiful flat terrain that enhances ease of movement".

== Origins ==
Odo Ere has a heritage dating back some centuries. The people of Odo Ere and their kin at Akata Ere and Oke Ere, who are collectively called Ere people, migrated from the old Oyo Kingdom. The founder of Ere was an old woman, who was believed to be a beautiful princess from the royal family in the Old Oyo Kingdom. She migrated with some people to settle at Akata more than five centuries ago. The princess who left Old Oyo with her people to settle at Akata was generally and popularly called Iya Agba (i.e. the old woman) from where the Yagba people derived their name and dialect. From the oral history account, Iyekolo stated that Iya Agba had three male children; the oldest boy remained at Akata with his mother, the younger boy migrated to build a settlement at Ẹgbẹ, while the youngest boy migrated to develop a settlement at Eri. It was believed that the oldest brother, who lived with his mother at Akata, created two settlements called Odo Oko Ere (i.e. the lower settlement), which metamorphosed to the modern-day Odo Ere town and the Oke Oko Ere (i.e. the upper settlement), which became the current Oke Ere town respectively. The people of Odo Ere are Yoruba people like the Yagba and entire Okun people, who are one of the Yoruba sub-ethnic groups that occupy the most North-eastern part of Yoruba land. The political and religious systems of the people of Odo Ere have the same in common with the rest of Okun-Yoruba people as documented by ethnoarchaeological scholars.

After settling at Akata for a long time, there was a gradual expansion in the population as it was a trade route connecting Katunga, the capital of the Old Oyo Kingdom with Kano and North Africa around 1700. The way of life of the Odo Ere people followed that of the Yoruba people as exemplified by their dialect, culture, tradition, names, folklore, norms and values that bear substantial affinity and semblance to Yoruba people in South-West Nigeria. Odo Ere consists of four Aku (i.e. clans) called Isaba clan, Ibaru clan, Oke Aga clan and Ipa clan. Each of the four clans is semi-autonomous with a democratic council of chiefs like other clans in Okunland under a unified and democratic socio-political leadership of the Elere of Ere.

== Local capital ==
Yagba West Local Government Area in Kogi State is located in the Kogi West Senatorial District along the Western region of the State where it adjoins with Kwara State on the latitude of 8,15N and 5,33E with a total land area of 11,276 km. Based on the 2006 census population figure, Yagba West Local Government Area has a population of 139,928 people then, which has been projected to 188,900 in 2016 by the National Population Commission of Nigeria. The eight communities that constitute Yagba West Local Government are traditionally called Akumejo meaning eight communities as recognised by Kwara State in 1982. From the popular oral history of West Yagba people, the historian Bolaji Iyekolo confirmed that Odo Ere is the oldest town among the eight communities that make up Yagba West Local Government. This fact was stated in 1995 by Chief Olatunji Simoyan in his book, Egbe Chronicles. In a Letter of Appreciation addressed to the former military President of Nigeria, General Ibrahim Babangida, by the Ere Welfare Association dated 29 October 1991 commending the General Babangida for siting the headquarters of Yagba West Local Government in Odo Ere, Ere Welfare Association categorically declared that Odo Ere is the earliest settlement in West Yagba accepted by the entire people of Yagba in Kogi State. This letter was contained on pages 46 to 51 in the book, The Making of Ere, authored by the historian Chief Bolagi Iyekolo. This fact was further substantiated with the British Colonial Government Memo dated 21 June 1930 in which the British Colonial Officer, Captain W.J. Warren stated that the traditional meeting place of all the people of West Yagba District had been at Okutadudu in Odo Ere. The eight communities consist of Ere, Ẹgbẹ, Okeri, Ọgga, Odo Eri, Ogbe, Ejiba and Okoloke. Given the fact that Odo Ere is acknowledged as the oldest town in Yagba West, it became de jure headquarters. Prior to the coming of the Europeans, Odo Ere was the headquarters and the meeting place of Akumejo people.

During the colonial era beginning from the 1890s, Odo Ere was designated as the headquarters of West Yagba District by the British colonial government. Odo Ere was duly acknowledged as the headquarters of West Yagba District in 1900 by the British authorities in the Ilorin Province. Also, the town was recognized as the headquarters of West Yagba District by the representatives of the British colonial administration such as the District Officer, Pategi-Lafiaji Division in 1933, the District Officer of Kabba Province in 1934 and the District Officer, Pategi-Lafiaji Division in 1934 respectively in their reports. When the Yagba Native Authority, comprising the West Yagba and East Yagba Districts, was created in 1934 Odo Ere was designated the headquarters of West Yagba District. Before 1934, the British administration separated the Yagba people under two broad administrative divisions consisting of West Yagba under the Pategi-Lafiagi Division and East Yagba under Kabba Division. Following Governor Donald Cameron's reform of Lord Lugard's indirect rule in Nigeria between 1931 and 1935, he corrected the anomalies of separating people with similar socio-cultural affinity in different administrative systems. Moreover, Governor Cameron suspended the idea of imposing a system of administration on a group of people without conducting prior investigations and consultations with them to identify the form of the native administration system that would best serve their interest. Against this background, the British colonial administration commissioned A.R Bailey, the Assistant District Officer of Pategi-Lafiagi Division, to conduct inquiries with the Yagba people on the integration of West Yagba and East Yagba under the Kabba Province and the nature of the native administration that would suit them. Following the fusion of West Yagba and East Yagba into the Kabba Province, Odo Ere was further designated as the headquarters of West Yagba. By 1938, West Yagba District had set up an elected Council as the preferred form of government that was best suited to their socio-political needs and aspirations. Furthermore, Iyekolo asserted that during the introduction of the autonomous regional government by the British administration in Nigeria between 1954 and 1960, the Edict of the Northern Nigeria Government of 1958 recognised Odo Ere as the headquarters of West Yagba District.

Under the administration of General Yakubu Gowon between 1966 and 1975, Colonel David Bamigboye, the then Governor of Kwara State, reaffirmed Odo Ere as the headquarters of Yagba West Local Government Area. In 1975, the government of Colonel Ibrahim Taiwo, the then Governor of Kwara State, reasserted Odo Ere as the headquarters of West Yagba. Additionally, during the second Republic in 1982, the administration of Adamu Atta, the then civilian Governor of Kwara State, revalidated Odo-Ere as the headquarters of West Yagba when it was made the headquarters of Akumejo Local Government Area. More importantly, the government of General Ibrahim Badamosi Babangida reinstated Odo Ere as the headquarters of Yagba West Local Government Area when he created new nine states and many Local Government Areas on 27 August 1991.

== Traditional political structure ==
Odo Ere is governed by a hierarchy of traditional political institutions. There are three major strata of traditional, political leadership structures in Ere consisting of the Elere (i.e. the Ọba of Ere), the Baale (the head of chiefs) and the Council of Chiefs consistent with the political tradition in many towns and cities in the Yoruba heartland. At the top of the hierarchical structure of leadership is the paramount ruler called Elere of Ere (i.e. the Ọba or the King of Ere), who is the equivalent of Ọba or King in Yoruba tradition practiced in Ile Ife and Oyo. The traditional political system in Ere is led by the Elere of Ere. Before the coming of the British colonial administration, Elere of Ere was duly recognised as the highest political leader in Ere During the arrival of the British colonial government, Elere of Ere was acknowledged as the apex authority over the Ere people.

The Elere is the monarchical head of the traditional government and institutions in Odo Ere land. Between 1861 and 1895, the reign of Elere Ogbamanu was prominent, and the colonial Government gave him a staff of office in 1900 in recognition of his authority. According to the Assistant Resident District Officer, Pategi-Lafiagi Division, in 1931 the Elere of Ere was the first District Head of West Yagba placed on a monthly salary of £1:18.5 and he was the highest-paid traditional ruler among his peers. The Elere maintains law and order in the town; he administers the affairs of the people and promotes peace and prosperity in the land. Under the 1916 Native Authority Ordinance promulgated by Frederick Lugard, a traditional ruler such as Elere of Ere, Baale of Ere or a Chief was empowered by the colonial government to maintain law, order and peace in their domain. Moreover, in the 1914 Native Court Ordinance enacted by Frederick Lugard, a court consisting of some native judges headed by the traditional ruler such as Elere holding court sessions to administer customary laws and try minor offences and crimes. Therefore, with the implementation of the Native Court Ordinance 1914 and the Native Authority Ordinance enacted by the Lugard colonial administration, the two Ordinances conferred some administrative, judicial, including political and economic responsibilities upon an Oba and a Baale, including Elere of Ere and Baale of Ere in 1914. After Sir Donald Cameron replaced Sir Frederick Lugard, in 1933 he introduced four major legislations that had some far-reaching implications on traditional political institutions in Odo Ere. With the implementation of the Sir Donald Cameron administration's Native Courts (Protectorate) Ordinance of 1933 and Native Authorities Ordinance of 1933, there was a reform of the traditional administration of law and justice in West Yagba District; the responsibilities of maintaining law and order, including the collection of taxes, and other functions fell on the shoulders of Elere.

The Elere of Ere is assisted by many chiefs appointed by him to carry out some delegated functions in the administration of the town as it is practiced in the traditional political system among Okun-Yoruba people. However, the throne of Elere of Ere is not necessarily hereditary as there are some towns in Yoruba land whose Obaship is not hereditary. Odo Ere people operate a non-hereditary Obaship similar to the Ibadan and Abeokuta kingdoms that used to practice an equalitarian style of appointment of Oba to provide for more upward mobility for its citizens. Odo Ere does not operate the dynastic kingdom leadership style that characterised the socio-political organisation that is common among some cities and towns in central Yorubaland, especially Ile Ife.

Given the fact that Odo Ere is one of the towns that make up the Okun-Yoruba people in Kogi State, the people of Odo Ere practice a non-hereditary kingship system popular among the Okun people which is rotated among clans unlike in cities such as Ile-Ife, Oyo, and others that operate hereditary monarchical ruling families. Whenever it is the turn of Odo Ere to produce the Elere of Ere, the throne of Elere is usually rotated between the Isaba, Oke Aga, Ibaru and Ipa clans. These four clans further consisted of ten wards called Akata, Isaba, Gbẹdẹ, Oke Aga, Ibaru, Ọkẹtẹ, Ipa, Iloe, Ayinaro and Odo Wẹrẹ. Nevertheless, the title of Elere of Ere is mainly rotational between Odo Ere and Oke Ere towns; whenever the Elere title rotates to either of the two towns, it would rotate to the next clan in waiting. Moreover, when the Elere of Ere goes to meet his ancestors, the title will rotate to the next town waiting in line. The rotation of Elere of Ere has been done peacefully between Odo Ere and Oke Ere without a major fuss because they are from the same source: they are children of Iya Agba that settled at Akata more than four centuries ago.

The second in the hierarchy is the Baalẹ of Ere (i.e. the deputy of Elere of Ere), who is next in authority to the Elere of Ere. When an Elere of Ere passes to meet his ancestors, the Baalẹ of Ere may probably be appointed to succeed the Elere of Ere or the people of Odo Ere may choose a new person to ascend the throne of Elere. In Yorubaland, the Baalẹ makes rules and regulations in conjunction with the Elere, and the Baalẹ implements them in association with the Council of Chiefs (Igbimo) and the compound heads (Olori Adugbo) assist him in his jurisdiction. The Baalẹ of Ere conducts regular deliberations with Elere and maintains law and order in the town; he administers the affairs of the people, promotes peace, prosperity and well-being of the people in the town. In Yorubaland, the Baalẹ maintains law and order and tries minor cases in his domain. The Baalẹ of Ere maintains laws and orders, tries minor cases, and appoints some chiefs to assist him in carrying out some delegated functions to ensure the smooth running of the administration of the town having been empowered alongside Elere of Ere by the colonial government under the Native Courts Ordinances of 1914 and 1933 and the Native Authorities Ordinances of 1916 and 1933. Like the Elere of Ere, the Baalẹ of Ere is rotational between Odo Ere and Oke Ere, but the rotation is consequent upon the demise of an Elere of Ere. Nevertheless, the throne of Baalẹ of Ere is not automatically hereditary like the Elere of Ere.

The third level in the hierarchy is the Council of Traditional Chiefs and the Honorary Chiefs called Igbimo before the coming of the British administration that supports the Elere of Ere or the Baalẹ of Ere in ensuring the smooth administration, development, promotion of peace and well-being of the people of Ere land. The traditional chiefs are appointed from the eight wards called Akata, Ọkẹtẹ, Ipa, Iloe, Isaba, Igbẹdẹ, Oke Aga and Ibaru from among the clans and lineages that constitute Odo Ere. They are made of successful people with integrity, good education, business skills and knowledge of tradition. The honorary chiefs are members of the successful educated and business elite, who are honoured and awarded chieftaincy titles by the Elere of Ere or the Baalẹ of Ere based on their excellent personal achievements, selfless contributions to the development of the town and good reputation. Also, the honorary chieftaincy titles are given to indigenes of Odo Ere, who have brought outstanding honour, glory and valuable contributions to the town through their personal commitment, dedication and patriotism to Ere community as it is practiced throughout Yorubaland. All the chiefs in Odo Ere, regardless of their statuses and functions, work harmoniously in assisting the Elere or the Baalẹ of Ere in rendering valuable services towards the upliftment, peace, progress and improvement of the community. The Elere or the Baalẹ of Ere may decide in consultation with his chiefs to give honorary chieftaincy titles to worthy non-indigenes, who have made positive contributions to the development of Odo Ere.

Besides the above elaborate political structure, Odo Ere has the basic socio-political unit called Idile (i.e. the family unit). In Odo Ere and in Yorubaland, Idile constitutes the smallest political unit. Atanda argues that the Yoruba people evolved a basic socio-political organisation in the course of their development called ẹbi or idile, which is the lineage system. Idile, the family unit in Odo Ere, is a dynamic system that has expanded exponentially due to population growth in the town. Additionally, as the family units in Odo Ere grew, more family units developed, which metamorphosed into Ẹbi (i.e. extended family) in all the clans, and they usually live in spatially defined areas like family compounds in Odo Ere. The Ẹbi members called Ọmo̩ Ẹbi or Ọmo̩ Ẹlẹbi (i.e. extended family members) shared the same ancestral lineage in Odo Ere like the ẹbi in the central Yorubaland. Given the expansion of the extended family members, some Ẹbi members have moved out of the family compounds to build their separate modern houses or settlements within the town. Each family lineage in Odo Ere has a family head usually the oldest man called Olori Ẹbi. The olori ẹbi in Odo Ere does not operate as an autocratic leader, and he is not a paramount ruler. Olori Ẹbi provides leadership in consultation with the older men and women members of the extended family. In some situations, the olori ẹbi, who is the embodiment of the cultural norms, may be a titled chief in the town, and he may not necessarily be a titled chief.

== Economy and agriculture ==
The economic activities of Odo Ere are primarily based on agriculture, craft, trade, business and the civil service system. As far back as 1912 during the colonial administration, the people of Odo Ere and Yagba people had established trade relations with Nupe and Hausa traders. During this period, Odo Ere people traded with Pategi people. Local traders in Odo Ere travelled to Nupe to sell kola nuts, palm oil and native clothes. Many of the men in Odo Ere are traditionally peasant farmers and hunters. Some of them practise various arts and crafts such as carpentry, blacksmithing, carving, weaving, and leatherworking in a similar way to men in central Yorubaland in Nigeria. Others are involved in furniture making, fashion designing, plumbing, bricklaying, building, painting and others. Some of the upper and middle-class men invested in businesses such as hospitality, petroleum, education, transportation, timber logging and trading. The majority of the women are reputed for practising arts and crafts such as bead making, basket making, cloth weaving, and rope making. Others practice mat making, cloth dying, pot making, calabash decoration, cap making such as their fellow Yoruba women in South West, Nigeria.

Women engage in trading in goods and production of gari and elubọ among others. Some upper class and middle-class women invested in supermarket, restaurants and cafeteria selling good and nutritious foods with drinks and others. Also, many of the educated men and women living in the town are civil servants working in the state and the local government institutions and departments.

The people in Odo Ere practice three types of farming systems (a) farming system that is practiced near the town (oko etile), (b) farming system that is practiced far away from the town in which the farmers return to the town on a daily basis (oko), and (c) farming system that is practiced at extremely distant farmlands that are far away from the town where the farmers live on the farm for days, weeks or months before returning to the town (oko ni waju). These three types of the farming systems in the town correspond with the three types practiced in the Yoruba heartland in South West, Nigeria.

a. Food crops

Some of the food crops planted in Odo Ere are aerial yam (i.e. Dioscorea Bulbifera), banana and plantain, beans, cocoyam (i.e. Colocasia Esculentum), cassava, water yam (i.e. Dioscorea Alata), maize, white yam (i.e. Dioscorea Rotundata), sorghum, sweet potato, rice, yellow yam (i.e. Dioscorea Cayenensis) and others.

Additionally, farmers in Odo Ere grow a variety of yams called ajimokun, ọgọdọyọ, elemsu, ekunmọ, ewura, including sagbẹ, agga, oodo, ẹẹsin, kẹrẹgẹ, kampi, efee, ẹwasiko, esuru, koko (cocoyam), emnna, gangan, aagbii, areyin, paki-onisu, among others.

b. Vegetables

Among the vegetables planted in the town used for soup making are okro, spinach, ẹfo tẹtẹ (African spinach), ẹfo sọkọ (green vegetable), ẹfọ gbure (waterleaf), ewuro (bitter leaf), amunututu (waterleaf), ewedu (jute), igi oshe, and igi dẹrẹ. The above-mentioned food items and vegetables found in Odo Ere are used to prepare different sumptuous meals and delicacies which are equally common in Yagbaland.

c. Fruits

The fruits grown in Odo Ere include tomato, banana, orange, mango, pineapples, pepper, melon, pawpaw, cashew, grape, lime, guava, coconuts, almond, ackee (called isin in Yagba dialect), tangerine, garden eggs and many others.

d. Livestock

Also, livestock farming is practiced to a limited extent by the people. Men and women tend goats, sheep, poultry and pigs. Some breed dogs for commercial purposes, while others breed snail and others.

e. Cash crops

Some of the cash crops grown in Odo Ere are cocoa, coffee, cotton, groundnut (peanut), millet, oil palm, and cashew nuts, among others. These cash crops produced in Odo Ere are common agricultural commodities produced in Yagbaland, Okunland, Yorubaland, and some parts of Nigeria. Moreover, during the British colonial rule, the agents of the Royal Niger Company prospected for cash crops such as coffee, cashew nuts, cotton, groundnut, palm kernel and others in the town.

It is important to stress the processing of cassava, maize, yam, sorghum and banana into varieties of flours (elubọ) which serves as a form of small-scale business that provides a significant source of income for women and food for the people in the community.

It must be emphasised that the success of the agricultural economy in Odo Ere in the production of food crops, vegetables, cash crops, and fruits discussed above rests on the presence of some rivers and streams that provide water for farming, plants and animals in the town. Some of the major rivers that made agricultural practice and small-scale irrigation of farmland possible in the town are River Lawiri, River Oofi, River Iya, River Onfun and River Igboran. Essentially, River Lawiri derives its source from Oke Ere; its freshwater flows across the streambed between banks through Akata Ere, which serves as its middle course and down to Odo Ere, which is its lower course where it facilitates agricultural production, farm irrigation and production of fruits in Lawiri area along the Odo Ere-Ilorin road axis. At this point along Odo Ere-Ilorin road, Lawiri River takes its course down by passing under the Lawiri bridge flowing to the right-hand section of the town where it provides abundant water supply to aid large farming system in Lawiri farm settlements more than 7 kilometres from the Odo Ere town centre. Additionally, River Oofi flows through Odo Ere land providing fresh water to promote farming, domestic use and it eventually connects to Oyi River to boost farm irrigation at Omi dam where Kogi State and Yagba West Local Government are expanding rice production, and job opportunities for the citizens of Odo Ere, Yagba West and Kogi State, among others. Also, the freshwater of River Iya flows through Odo Ere; according to Bolaji Iyekolo on page 5 of the book The Making of Ere, he stated that the river partitioned the town into areas called Kege Iya (upper settlement) and Ikọja Iya (lower settlement) respectively along Odo Ere-Kabba road, where it provides water for agricultural production and domestic utilities. Furthermore, some of the streams that provide fresh water for subsistence agricultural practices in Odo Ere are Aso, Gọdọgbọ, Ibu Iyawo, Etimkan, Omugbogbo, Turuku and Omi Ọpẹ that aid farmers specialising in Oko Etile in the production of Shea butter, locust beans, vegetable, maize, yam, beans, sorghum, cassava, and fruits such as cashew, mango and orange, which Odo Ere farmers commonly produced like the Yagba peasant farmers.

Markets

There are four major markets in the mainland of Odo Ere called Ọja Yagba, Ọja Ọpẹ, Ọja Ọba and Ọja Oke while there is Ojere market in Akata Ere; commercial and economic activities in these markets are dominated by women and conducted periodically such as every three-day, weekly or daily, and they represent prominent locations of economic and social activities in the town. Markets in Odo Ere ensure people fulfil their demand and supply needs; they perform the economic functions of food supply, local exchange of resources, internal trade system and facilitate consumption. The markets in Odo Ere set the socio-economic rhythms for the regulation of circulation and convergence of the people in the town and some neighbouring towns to have place-time inter-relationships for the exchange of goods and services. These markets are conducted in open locations in the town which is common in Nigeria, where people regularly gather for the exchange of goods for sale and purchase of food items, clothing materials, jewellery, shoes and other goods. Also, the people sell consumer products, imported foods and goods, vegetables, dried fish and meat, live goats and chickens, frozen chickens, fish and meat, fruits, books and stationery, and household goods, among others. However, a few decades ago, Ọja Ọba used to have some market stalls. These markets are often patronised by people from Okunland in Kogi State, including people from towns and local governments in Kwara State.

One crucial characteristic of markets in Odo Ere is the excitement of the haggling system of a price negotiation between the sellers and buyers of products to ensure both parties mutually agree on a fair price prior to the exchange of goods. The process of haggling by women and men in the market in Nigeria involves a situation where the seller and the buyer of a product make a sequential offer and counter-offer to each other until they mutually agree on a price. This exchange situation occurs when the person trying to buy a product is negotiating to pay the least amount possible, while the person selling the product is trying to maximize the selling price. From observation, women perfect the art of haggling system better than men in the markets. Women in Odo Ere utilise markets as a business institution to promote their economic activities and ensure social security. Markets play some crucial functions in the economic life of the people of Odo Ere. They help promote commodity distribution and consumption, facilitate the exchange of resources and strengthen the economic and financial base of a town. Also, they provide sources of taxation for the Yagba West Local Government.

== Culture ==
The people of Odo Ere have distinctive cultural norms and values:

=== Language ===
The people of Odo Ere speak Yagba dialect, which shares a linguistic affinity with the Yoruba language spoken and written in South West, Nigeria. The Yagba dialect spoken and written by the people of Odo Ere consisted of the same alphabets as the Yoruba language. The Yagba dialect, as a form of the Yoruba language, is a tonal language that has three major tones called high, mid and low tones. The Yagba dialect spoken by Odo Ere possesses the same characteristics as the Yoruba language. It consists of a set of communicative signals, sound symbols, phonological and grammatical systems, and vocal sounds. It is conventional, creative, productive, and dynamic. Odo Ere has many rich proverbs, folklore and legends. The people use figurative speech in their daily conversations and communication to express antithesis, apostrophe, euphemism, hyperbole, metonymy, irony, anaphora, litotes, metaphor, onomatopoeia, paradox, antithesis, oxymoron, simile, personification, pun, understatement and others, rendered in resonant Yagba dialect.

=== Arts, crafts and trade ===
In Odo Ere both men and women engage in different forms of arts, crafts and trade as sources of economy. The cultural arts and crafts commonly practiced in Odo Ere include bead making, basket making, cloth weaving, rope making, mat making, cloth dying, pot making, calabash decoration, cap making, pestle and mortar making, blacksmithing and others. The arts and crafts bear equivalent attributes and manifest identical creative characteristics as those produced in Yorubaland, particularly in Oyo Empire and Ile Ife. Odo Ere women are very industrious individuals who engage in businesses involving arts, crafts and trade. Many of them practise weaving of different clothes such as Asọ Ofi popularly called Asọ-Oke, Kente and many others. They weave different colours of Asọ-Oke such as ‘‘ẹtù’’ (navy blue), ‘àlàárì’ (rich maroon), and ‘sányán’ (light brown with some creamy stripes). Following the arts and crafts usually done by women in the central Yorubaland, a good number of older women in Odo Ere are involved in pottery. They make both small and medium-size pots for cooking and big size pots for reserving water. Others practise bead making, hair braiding, basket making, cloth weaving, rope making, mat making, cloth dying, fashion design, and hairstyling among others. Many of them are into petty trading and small-medium scale businesses. Additionally, following the tradition of art and crafts by men in Yorubaland, some older men in Odo Ere practise cap making, rope making, pestle and mortar making, and mat making; others are involved in bricklaying, shoe mending, carpentry, goldsmithing, furniture making, fashion designing and painting. Some practise blacksmithing through which they produce hoes and cutlasses for agricultural purposes, together with knives, traps, local hunting guns, and many other implements. Also, a substantial proportion of them is into petty trading and small-medium scale businesses.

=== Dress ===
Odo Ere people use assorted traditional and modern styles of dressing for different occasions and events such as a wedding, naming, birthday, burial and other social outings. The dressing styles for men are different from women, even when they use the same fabrics to make them. Among the dresses worn by men are buba, agbada, gbariyẹ, dandogo (upper dresses), ilarun (hunter's shoulder sleeve), dansiki, including sokoto, kẹmbẹ, sọọrọ, gbamu, kamu, ibantẹ (trouser-like designs) and fila, onide, gọbi, abeti-aja, tinko, alagbaa, oribi and others (caps). They may be made of the same fabrics or specially made from asọ oke or ofi which can be in different colours such as àlàárì (rich maroon),ẹtu (navy blue) and sányán (light brown with some creamy stripes), and other colours to make exquisite aesthetic designs. Odo Ere women have beautiful cultural dresses such as ọmọnijogun (wedding dress), iro (wrapper), buba (blouse–type loose top), iborun (shoulder shawl), tobi (skirt/underwear), ipele (long shoulder dress), sinmi (sleeveless T-shirt), gele (head tie), yẹri (skirt/underwear), aran, and tanpapa, which they wear during wedding, including naming and burial ceremonies and festivals. Some of the traditional fabrics used to design dresses in Odo Ere include asọ oke, ofi, adirẹ, batiks, sányán, kente or other traditional fabrics. Also, they wear them during the wedding, naming and burial ceremonies, including during different religious festivals. Both men and women use modern fabrics and fashion design machines to make exquisite, gorgeous, flashy, glamorous and immaculate dresses. Apart from the above-mentioned traditional clothes, men in Odo Ere wear European styles of clothes such as shirts, trousers, suits, while women wear blouses, skirts, suits, gowns among others. All these dresses are sewn using various types of clothing materials. Additionally, the people of Odo Ere love excellent colours, fabrics and designs of the different types of dresses mentioned above; they may combine or mix many of the primary and secondary colours in sewing their dresses. Others may be designed using a single colour such as blue, green, white, including red, yellow, and other colours that are commonly used by their kith and kin in Okunlan and the central Yorubaland in South-West Nigeria.

=== Traditional and modern jewellery ===
Jewellery used by the people of Odo Ere consists of small decorative ornaments worn for personal adornment by women and men such as bracelets, earrings, rings and necklaces among others. People in the town are very glamorous in dressing by adorning different types of exotic beads to showcase belief system, fashion trends, royalty and wealth as it is richly done among the Yoruba people. Odo Ere women wear traditional jewellery such as yẹti (earrings), ilẹkẹdi (waist beads), ilẹkẹ ọwọ (wrist beads), ilẹkẹ ọrun (neck beads), including iyun, akun and lagidigba (royal beads for kings and chiefs) as their fellow Yoruba people. In the modern time, they use exotic ornaments such as oruka (rings), ẹgba ọrun, (necklaces), ẹgba ẹsẹ (anklets), and ẹgba ọwọ (bangles) made of gold, silver, diamonds and other gemstones. Also, men use rings, necklaces and bangles. However, the use of anklets for social adornment is not common among women and men in Odo Ere. Nevertheless, the adherents of indigenous religion such as the worshippers of Orisa and Sango deities may use anklets during their festivals.

=== Facialograph and body scarification ===
In the olden days, the beautification of the face using facialographs (facial marks) for aesthetic and cultural identity and the scarification of the body were practiced among the people of Odo Ere, but the tradition has become extinct in the town. The use of facialographic marks in Odo Ere is part of the rich Yoruba beautification and cultural identification marks often inscribed on the face or cheeks by burning or cutting of the skin using local blades or specially made small knives. In the olden days, there were specialist facial markers who practiced the occupation by charging fees. In Odo Ere, the specialist facial markers were called Oloola in the olden days; they usually shave the heads and beards (if a male adult) of their clients prior to inscribing the facial marks of their choosing. In many cases, facialographic marks are conducted when the clients (male and female) are young children; in fewer instances, they are done when the clients are young adults. Importantly, Johnson attested to the use of facial marks among Yagba people (in which Odo Ere people are part of) when he declared that the Yagba people in the North-easterly part of Nigeria are sub-ethnic groups of the Yoruba, who are distinguishable by their long tribal marks on each cheek and usually meeting at an angle of the mouth. In the distant past, men and women used facial marks for beautification and identification of their specific family, clan and lineage.

Moreover, women in Odo Ere used facial and body scarification to make aesthetic and appealing designs to beautify their bodies, particularly making stylish and artistic designs on their faces, tummies, legs, thighs, arms, hips and wrists. Body scarification as a means of beautification and identification in Odo Ere, in the olden days, was similar to the modern-day tattoo. It is possible that the practice of using facial marks and body scarification must have been eliminated in Odo Ere about 100 years ago due to modernisation as someone might see such marks on the faces or the bodies of elderly men and women in their 80 and 90 years old in the town today. However, some of the facial marks used in Odo Ere in the past by our forebears included pele (i.e. pele Ifẹ, pele Ijẹbu), abaja (i.e. abaja-ẹgba, abaja-owu, abaja-mẹrin), kẹkẹ (i.e. kẹkẹ owu), and gọmbọ popularly used by the Yoruba people in the central Yorubaland. Other Yoruba facialographic marks commonly used for beautification in the central Yorubaland in South West, included bamu, jamgbadi, mande and ture but they might not be very popular among our ancestors in Odo Ere.

=== Hairstyles ===
Odo Ere women engage in irun kiko (hair knotting) often done with black threads is gradually becoming obsolete); irun didi (hair plaiting without using threads); and irun biba (hair braiding). Hairstyles of young ladies and older women in Odo Ere are not mainly for beautification; they are means of communicating marital identity and social status. Also, to a limited extent, hairstyles may be a mark of initiation for indigenous religious worshippers such as the Sango or Orisa adherents. Some of the traditional hairstyles commonly done by Ere women include suku ọlọgẹdẹ (banana leaves), koroba, patẹwọ (clap your hands), kọjusọkọ, (face your husband), kolẹsẹ (no legs or all back), kẹhinsọkọ (turn your back to your husband), ipakọ ẹlẹdẹ (backhead of a pig), panumọ (keep your mouth shut), onilegogoro (skyscraper), awoyọyọ (marching soldiers), ikoto (snail), ilẹkẹdi (waist beads), ogun pari (the war is over), which was used to commemorate the end of the Nigerian Civil War in 1970 and many others. Additionally, the women do modern hairstyles like scissors, Bob Marley, face-to-face, boys follow me, telephone line, all back, three-star, roundabout, eko bridge, twisting, pick and drop, fixing of weavon, Ghana weaving, curly pixie, Sade Adu and many more.

=== Music and songs ===
People of Odo Ere generally appreciate music and songs. Some are used for the following events:

(1) Carol songs for Christmas, including songs for the New Year, Easter and other Christian festivals. (2) Songs for Islamic festivals. (3) Songs for aagan (New yam festival) celebration. (4) Songs for aare (Rite of passage festival used to socialise young boys between ages 14 and 20 into adulthood). (5) The rara chant. (6) Aro chant, a form of solemn funeral chanting or dirge by women for the deceased. (7) Oriki, a Yoruba praise chant. (8) Specific music, chants and songs for royal events. (9) Songs for wedding, house warming, child christening and burial ceremonies such as iregun songs. (10) Songs and drums for indigenous religions such as egungun and alarumọ (masquerade), ijala song for hunters, including agẹrẹ drum and layẹwu (hunters' masquerade) are associated with ogun onire festival, while imọlẹ songs are for orisa festival.

== Popular games and sports in Odo Ere ==
We have a collection of games and sports for promoting social interaction, healthy living and mental well-being in Odo Ere. Some of the popular traditional games in the town include ayo ọlọpọn, ikoto, ijakadi, pero, beleni, talo wa ninu ọgba na, and boju boju. Other popular plays include ekun meran, mo ni ni mo ni ni, e ma weyin o, ina mbe lori oke, tinko tinko, and many more. It is important to explain some of these games below.

a. Ayo Ọlọpọn

One of the age-long popular games in the town is ayo ọlọpọn played by both men and women, but men play it the more. It is one of the oldest indigenous games in Nigeria that is popular among the Yoruba people.Ayo ọlọpọn is made of a wooden board with twelve round hollow depressions sometimes called holes consisting of six on each side of the board just the size of a fist carved in the wooden board. In addition to the wooden board, there are 48 ayo seeds consisting of 4 ayo seeds in each hollow depression carved in the board. The game is usually played by two people at a time, mostly in the afternoon till evening time in Odo Ere. Apart from being a game popular among the elderly, many young adults and teenagers also learn how to play Ayo. Generally, Ayo game is played by people of the same age group and gender. This implies that men play with their fellow men, women equally play with other women, while the teenagers play with their peers. The player with the upper hand in the game is often called Ota (meaning a dexterous and skilful player), while the losing player is usually called Ope (meaning an unskilful player). Scholars have asserted that "Ayo Olopon" game is a potential rehabilitation device for people suffering dementia in Africa as the game requires the players to exercise a high level of concentration and employ good strategies. It is believed that the value of "Ayo Olopon" extends beyond social or recreation functions to include a positive impact on the philosophical life and health and wellbeing of the people. For instance, Olúwọlé Òkéwándé confirmed in his doctoral thesis that "ayo olopon" game has some curative medical values as it can cure dementia, hypertension as well as poor eye-sight. The ayo game requires a lot of brainpower involving planning, strategy and mathematical skills to beat the opponent. It is not a game for a temperamental person as it is often accompanied with jibes and taunts from the players designed to browbeat the opponent. Also, the spectators often deploy jibes, taunts or jokes to spice up the game and make it very interesting. In some cases, particularly among men, the players and the spectators may take bets on who is going to win the game.

b. Ikoto

Another popular game is Ikoto made from a snail shell or tinplate into a conical shape and commonly played among young boys, often between two boys or more. Children play ikoto turn by turn by spinning it on the ground while it moves fast rhythmically in a fascinating version. When a child spins it, the child will use one of their hand hands or fingers to touch the tip of ikoto as its spins around by ensuring it turns over its open surface to cover the earth. If one of the players defeats his opponent, the person who lost the game is made to stretch out the back of his palm while the victor strikes the out-stretched back of the palm with the ikoto for about 4 or 6 times depending on the rule of the game.

c. Bojuboju

Another game is bojuboju, a variant of the hide-and-seek game, which is suitable for around 6 to 10 children aged 10 to 12 years. Both male and female children enjoy bojuboju game. When playing bojuboju game, a person covers his/her eyes while singing bojuboju song and other children hide somewhere.

The Yoruba song of the bojuboju game.

Bojuboju oo
Oloro nbọ
E̩para mọ oo
Se kin si?
Si si sin sii!
E̩ni ti oloro ba mu a pa jẹ.

The English translation of bojubujo song.

Cover your eyes now
The masquerade is coming
Go to hide yourselves
Should I uncover the face?
You can uncover the face!
Whosoever the masquerade finds he will kill.

When the leader of the children singing the bojuboju song asks the question Se kin si?, the children reply, Si si sin sii, then he/she can uncover the face of the boy/girl to enable him/her run around to search and catch any of their peers. Bojuboju gives children fun as they run around, and it enhances the athletic skills, social wellbeing and physical health of the children. Also, it promotes listening skills, sound detection and discrimination skills, thinking and quick decision-making skills as well as perceptual skills.

d. Ijakadi

The people of Odo Ere enjoy Ijakadi called Gidigbo or E̩kẹ. Ijakadi is a traditional moonlight wrestling match that involves two boys at a time, which is popular among young boys and young adults, given its rough and vigorous physical demand. It may feature beating of traditional drums or singing by boys while the two wrestlers employ grapping technique to hold and throw over, take down or pin down each other. One of the wrestlers must be able to get a pinfall over his opponent to win the bout. Ijakadi involves the application of combat skills, intellectual calculation, counter-balancing, intuitive measurement, planning, pre-empting, prodding, fast-thinking, quick decision making and fast-acting to pinfall or body slam an opponent on the ground. A wrestling match may last between two and twenty minutes or more depending on the skills of the wrestlers. In some cases, there may not be a winner between the two wrestlers. In selecting the wrestlers, usually two at a time, an effort is made to ensure that the wrestlers are within the same age grade in order to prevent a situation where an older person might pinfall the younger person so hard to the point of injuring him. Ijakadi enhances physical fitness, mental development, planning skill, fast-thinking, total wellbeing, quick and quality decision-making, strength and courage among boys and young men in Odo Ere. It is a form of recreation and entertainment to promote the spirit of competitive healthy rivalry among men.

e.Tẹn-tẹn

One of the popular games is tẹn-tẹn that is commonly played by young girls in Odo Ere in the afternoon and evening. Tẹn-tẹn game has been described as slightly similar to "Rock, Paper, Scissors" game which is played by carefully studying and pre-empting the possible moves of the opponent's hands and feet. To play tẹn-tẹn game, two girls are usually involved. The two girls may be in age grade or they may be of different age grades. While playing tẹn-tẹn, two girls will face each other clapping their hands, singing and simultaneously raising their legs one after another slightly off the ground in rhythmical form. The rule of tẹn-tẹn is that one of the competitors must not raise a leg directly opposite the leg which her opponent raised up. If the lead girl raises a left leg, her opponent must raise the same left leg simultaneously; if in the second round the lead girl raises the right leg, the opponent must raise her right leg simultaneously and rhythmically. The girl that raises up a wrong leg automatically gives her opponent a point advantage against her. The tẹn-tẹn game involves critical skills such as fast speed, quick calculation in tens, fast-thinking, agility, intelligence, physical development, self-articulation and quick action. It helps to promote physical fitness, mental alertness, quick and quality decision-making, good health and wellbeing among young girls.

f. Talo wa ninu ọgba na

Also, Talo wa ninu ọgba na game, which means "Who is in the garden?", is a game of fun and excitement that is popular among children in Odo Ere. The game is categorised as a form of dance play for children and it is conceived as a form of functional education for national growth. Both boys and girls participate in the game in the community. There is instruction for playing the game. Usually, all the boys and girls playing the game will be in a standing position holding their hands to form a circle. One of the players of the game often stays outside of the circle. The person outside the circle will begin by running round the other participants in position standing and holding their hands in a circular form while he/she sings the song and asks questions. As the person outside the circle is singing and running round other participants holding their hands in a circular form begins to ask questions, the other participants will respond by answering her questions. Immediately he/she gets to the end of the song, he/she will choose the participants standing at the point where the song ends to take his/her place while he/she replaces the person that had been chosen. The new person outside the circle continues with the song as he/she runs round the other players standing and holding their hands in a circle. He/she chooses another player at the point where the song ends. This game continues on and on until almost a good number of the participants must have been chosen to run outside the circle.

Talo wa ninu ogba na game promotes physical and mental wellbeing in the girls. Also, the girls develop an interpersonal relationship, phonetic and vocal skills and social maturity skills. It helps to encourage cordial and friendly relationship among the girls. It prevents boredom and depressed mood as it is full of fun and entertainment. It promotes mastery and precision skills.

The Yoruba song of the Talo wa ninu ogba na game.

Ta lo wa ni inu ogba na?
Omo kekere kan ni
Se kin wa wo?
Mawa wo.
Omo ban tu ti nbe nibi, tele mi kalo.

The English translation of Ta lo wa ninu ogba na game.

Who is in the garden?
A little small girl.
Can I come see her?
No do not come to see her.
A big girl in this place, follow me.

The above-mentioned indigenous children and adult games/plays common in Odo Ere and Yorubaland are effective in boosting healthy living, good mental health, prevention of depression and reduction of anxiety, including the development of self-confidence, security from peer-intimidation, self-assurance, self-expression, good self-esteem, patience for turn-taking, and leadership skills, which are very common traits and attributes of children and adults in Odo Ere. They help in enhancing learning domains, cognitive development, emotional well-being, motor skills development, vocal language competence, moral uprightness, reflective thinking and social development.

Some of the modern games/sports that are commonly enjoyed by the people of Odo Ere are ludo, Scrabble, Monopoly, card games such as whot game, go fish (i.e. eléwénjewé), including sporting activities such as football, basketball, volleyball, table tennis, high jump, long jump, running, egg and spoon race, sack race, rope skipping, thug of war, and others.

== Marriage customs ==
The people of Odo Ere accord marriage and family significant importance as they are the main vehicles of group identities. The people of Odo Ere have a rich traditional marriage culture and beliefs such as the people of Okunland and the Yoruba heartland. Marriage in Odo Ere establishes a system of social relationships between a man and a woman and their respective families; it sets some social roles, ethics and values in the town in the way in Okunland and Yorubaland. The people of Odo Ere believe that a marriage ceremony is an elaborate event involving the entire extended family members, and not limited to the nuclear family members alone. There are three major types of marriage ceremonies held in the town such as Christian, Islamic and traditional marriage ceremonies. Marriage is usually consummated in Odo Ere between a man and a woman through three stages consisting of the introduction stage, the traditional wedding or engagement stage, and the church/mosque/registry wedding stage.

a. The introduction stage: This is the first step in the marriage system in Yorubaland. Marriage introduction is the first formalisation of intention to marry between a man and a woman in Odo Ere after they must have experienced a long or a short courtship culminating in an agreement between the intending couple to marry and live together as husband and wife for life. Marriage introduction involves the coming together of the parents and some relations of the husband and wife to signify the intention of the couple to marry. It is called marriage introduction because the parents and family members of the couple are formally introduced to both sides to enable them to know each other. Among the Odo Ere people, marriage introduction is between the families of a man and a woman; marriage is more than just a union between an individual man and a woman, it involves two families of the bride and the groom as it is practiced in Yorubaland. During the introduction, the husband's family brings some items such as a basket of fruits, a few bottles of non-alcoholic wine or alcoholic drink like schnapps, champagne depending on the religious inclination of the wife's family, and some crates of soft drinks. The acceptance of these materials by the parents and family members of the bride signifies their consent to offer their daughter in marriage to the man.

b. The traditional wedding or engagement stage: This is the second stage of marriage during which the husband and his family are expected to bring some wedding items, gifts and bride price to the family of the bride consisting of the bride's parents, extended family members and members of the clan (Ọmo̩ ẹbi or Ọmo̩ ẹlẹbi) of the bride and family friends. If the engagement ceremony is elaborate in form, it may be conducted by two women called Alaga Iduro (coordinating for the groom's family) and Alaga Ijokoo (coordinating for the bride's family) that add humour, fun, various musical performances to the traditional marriage. The symbolic traditional payment of bride price (Owo-ori) that is called wife money which is usually paid just before the wedding ceremony, in Odo Ere Owo-ori does not amount to purchasing the bride by the groom as the Yoruba people do not put a monetary value on the heads of their daughters in the form of bride price. The concept of a bride in the tradition of Odo Ere people is that a good wife is a priceless woman. The payment of bride price in Odo Ere serves some crucial functions; it is symbolic of a legitimate union, a complete acceptance and naturalizing exercise which establishes a woman's sense of honour and pride of belonging to her new family. In a few cases, the bride's parents may collect the bride price or dowry from the groom's family. In many families after the offer of the bride price by the groom's father and the acceptance of the bride price (Owo-ori) by the bride's father, the bride's father may immediately return the bride price to the parents of the groom in the public glare, usually accompanied with an emphatic statement that they do not sell their daughter to the groom, but out of genuine love and friendliness, they have given the bride out in marriage to the groom to love, care for and treat with respect as the weaker sex.

Some of the wedding gifts items required by the bridegroom to supply for the engagement include a box full of expensive clothes, cash, beautiful handbags, large tubers of yam, and two bottles of aromatic schnapps or some bottles of non-alcoholic wine depending on the religious inclination of the bride and groom's parents. Other items include a gallon of red oil, some kola nuts, a good number of bitter kolas, some pods of alligator pepper, a bottle of honey, some crates of soft drinks as well as the Bible or the Quran depending on the faith of the bride. During the engagement, the husband and wife may wear immaculate fabrics for the occasion; they may wear asọ oke, asọ ofi, lace material, guinea brocade, adirẹ guinea, silk, velvet or other expensive clothing materials. The groom may wear agbada, sokoto, with shoe and light jewellery, while the bride may wear iro, buba, gele with an expensive shoe, handbag, jewellery and others. The bride dresses as more gorgeously and beautifully as possible. The marriage engagement ceremony is usually an extensively prolonged event that is always made interesting and entertaining by singing, drumming, dancing and an elaborate presentation of gift items to the bride and her family. A wedding ceremony is usually one of the most cherished social events in the life of Odo Ere women. At the engagement, the bride's parents arrange for traditional musical entertainment comprising songs, drumming, food items and drinks. During the event, the groom and his friends are called out to prostrate for the parents and family members of the bride and asked respectfully to marry their daughter. The bride, who is elegantly and tastefully dressed and seated between her parents, usually takes delight in seeing her husband prostrate for her family members as a mark of submission and respect. Married ladies from Odo Ere always cherish the fact that their husbands prostrated for their families and themselves before they married them. The symbolism of the prostration of the groom to the bride and her family often enhances the dignity, self-image and self-worth of the bride. In many cases, the engagement ceremony may dovetail into a wedding eve party with an elaborate musical band to offer musical entertainment at the event up to midnight or till the early hours of the morning.

c. Church, mosque or registry wedding: This is the final solemnisation of the groom and the bride in the Church, Mosque or at the Registry depending on the religion of the couple, their financial ability or preference. It is the official blessing and certification of the wedding. The majority of the people in Odo Ere are Christians; many of them prefer a Church wedding. Also, some Christians prefer a wedding at the registry too. Also, there are people that opt for a traditional Odo Ere/Yoruba wedding system. Given the small population of Moslems in the town, they conduct a small number of Islamic weddings too.

== Law and justice ==
Prior to the coming of the British administration, the people had traditional systems of ensuring law and order in the town. With the advent of the British administration in 1895, a modern system of law enforcement and a judicial system began to develop in the town. The British Colonial Residents, the District Officers and the Assistant District Officers began to visit Odo Ere at various times when West Yagba District was under Ilorin Province, Pategi-Lafiagi Division, Kabba Province and when West Yagba District became an autonomous administration, and they finally built barracks for residential and administrative purposes. Nevertheless, with the colonial administration two major modern law enforcement agencies such as the Nigerian Police Force and the Court (judicial system) developed in Odo Ere that acted in an organised manner to enforce law and order and adjudicate between individuals or between individuals and entities in the town and the neighbouring town councils. The functions of each of the institutions are discussed below:

=== Yagba West Divisional Police Station ===
The current Yagba West Divisional Police Station in Odo Ere was preceded by Yagba Force established by the British administration in the early 1900s. Policing in Odo Ere could be traced back to the establishment of the Yagba Force by the British Administration under the command of an ex-West African Frontier Force Company Sergeant Major. In 1933 out of the 15 Yan Doka (i.e. native police) in Yagba District, the British administration posted one officer to Odo Ere who maintained law and order and guarded the treasury. The native police under the Native Administration in Odo Ere carried leather-covered batons in the day time, while in the night time they carried batons, torch-lights and whistles.

Typically, the current Nigerian Police Force is responsible for maintaining public order and law, including the provision of safety for life and property of all people living in Odo Ere. The police enforce the law, prevent, detect and investigate criminal activities in the town. The Yagba West Divisional Police was established in the town and the people of Odo Ere built a spacious Divisional Police Station for the forces to operate in 1996. The police personnel frequently engage in patrol or surveillance activities in order to detect and dissuade criminal activities in the town and the neighbouring towns. They carry out an investigation of crimes and apprehension of offenders; also, they are concerned with the prevention and punishment of crimes. Therefore, Odo Ere remains a safe haven for the indigenes and the immigrants as they co-exist peacefully in the town.

=== Justice ===
The judiciary in Odo Ere consists of the Magistrate and the Area Courts. Between 1934 and 1968, the West Yagba Native Authority Court operated a Native Court at Odo Ere being the headquarters of West Yagba. In 1934, the British Colonial Administration built the first Native Authority Court in West Yagba at Odo-Ere. The Native Court was presided over in rotation by all the Obas in West Yagba District. In 1934, the Native Court sat in full every ten days, while it sits every five days without the Obas of Ogbe and Okoloke in attendance due to the long distance of their communities. The principles, verdicts and sentences of the Native Authority Court at Odo Ere were an integral part of the Colonial Judicial System in Nigeria. The Native Court Authority in Odo Ere enforced the Civil cases on Matrimonial issues or Government Regulations as well as administered Criminal Justice among the people in tandem with the customary laws during the period of the British Administration.

== Healthcare facilities in Odo Ere ==
In April 1977, the foundation of Odo Ere Health Centre was laid. It was built through community efforts of the people and was commissioned on 27 December 1979 by Dr John Lawani, the then Kwara State Commissioner for Health. Throughout the 1980s and the 1990s, Odo Ere Health Centre was offering healthcare services with Oke Kalfari Clinic, established by Chief J.T Daramola was the first private healthcare centre located beside the First ECWA Church, to the entire people of Odo Ere and its environs. In 1994, the Kogi State Ministry of Health started full healthcare provision in the health centre consisting of pre-natal training and counselling for expectant mothers, child delivery and post-natal healthcare for nursing mothers and babies, including treatment of patients experiencing different forms of medical conditions. On 30 November 1994, Colonel Pun Omeruo, the Military Administrator of Kogi State, upgraded the Odo Ere Health Centre to a full-fledged General Hospital. On 10 June 1995, the General Hospital Odo Ere was officially commissioned by Dr N. Samuel, the then Commissioner for Health, Kogi State. Besides the above, in the 2000s, Kowontan Pharmacy provided pharmaceutical services to the health centres, the General Hospital and the entire Odo Ere community and its environs.

Currently, the healthcare facilities in Odo Ere can be categorised into the government's Odo Ere General Hospital, Odo-Ere District Health Unit, Akata-Ere Health Centre, Odo-Ere Family Support Programme Clinic and Yagba-West National Program on Immunization Office on one hand and small private medical clinics such as Ariyo Clinic & Maternity, and Maranatha Clinic, among others. They offer healthcare services to people based on their health needs and preferences. The General Hospital and other healthcare facilities in Odo Ere offer elaborate medical treatment, emergency rooms, dispensary functions, trauma management, patient care, including pharmaceutical, laboratory, diagnostic services, including the implementation of the National Programme on Immunization interventions of the Federal government.

== Government ministries and departments in Odo Ere ==
On 27 August 1991, the Military Government of President General Ibrahim Babangida created Kogi State and made Lokoja the capital of the state. During the creation of Kogi State on 27 August 1991 by Gen Ibrahim Badamosi Babangida, he created Yagba West Local Government and designated Odo Ere as the headquarters of the local government area. Following the creation of Yagba West Local Government, a number of government ministries and departments were established in the town. Kogi State government ministries in Odo Ere include Zonal Ministry of Agriculture, Zonal Ministry of Health and Zonal Ministry of Education. Government departments in the town include the Department for Agriculture, the Department for Works & Housing, the Department for Education, the Department for Health, the Department for Personnel, and the Department for Finance.
