= Obajana =

Obajana is a town in Kogi State, Nigeria. It is located in the Oworo district of Lokoja LGA, Kogi state.

== Industry ==
It is the site of the largest cement plant in Africa owned by Dangote.

== Transport ==
In 2014, a feasibility study for a railway line to serve this town was commenced.

== See also ==
- Railway stations in Nigeria
- Cement in Africa
