= Seth Sunday Ajayi =

Nigerian scientist and scholar

Seth Sunday Ajayi (born 16 May 1943) is a Nigerian scientist, scholar and the first African professor of wildlife ecology.

== Early life and education ==
Ajayi was born on 16 May 1943 in Mopa, Kogi State. He attended the Sudan Interior Mission Day School, Mopa and Titcombe College, Egbe, both in Kogi State. He used the Northern Nigerian Government Scholarship at both the Higher School Certificate and University levels and obtained the B.Sc. Honours degree in zoology in 1968. He resumed graduate study thereafter at the University of Edinburgh, Scotland, where he obtained his M.Sc. Degree in Wildlife Management using a United Nations Food and Agriculture Organization Fellowship in 1970. He completed a practical course at the College of African Wildlife Management, Mweka, Tanzania, prior to the completion of the Master of Science degree in Wildlife and Range Management in 1971. Ajayi's academic career was overshadowed by his highly rated PhD dissertation in wildlife management and was completed at the University of Ibadan in 1974.

== Career ==
Ajayi Joined the University of Ibadan as an assistant training fellow in wildlife and range management at the Department of Forestry in 1968. He moved up the academic ladder after his doctoral training and in 1980, Ajayi became the first African professor of wildlife conservation at the University of Ibadan. He created the Department of Wildlife and Fisheries Management with separate degree program in Wildlife and Fisheries Management and became the pioneer head, Department of Wildlife and Fisheries Management, University of Ibadan, 1981–88. He was also the Pioneer Dean, College of Environmental Resources Management, University of Agriculture, Abeokuta.

Ajayi was team leader of an expert group, which produced the Action Plan for Conservation of renewable natural resources in Nigeria. He was also project leader at the National Science and Technology Development Agency of a research project on studies dealing with the domestication and control of wildlife species and their importance in food production and public health. He was chairman of the Publicity Sub-Committee of the National Wildlife Conservation Committee and chairman of the Committee of Wildlife Specialists on the Development of Lake Kainji National Park.

== Research ==
His work has emphasized the need to bring the rural population into development policy process by incorporating them into wildlife management institutions and mechanisms, so that they can derive a sense of ownership and thus develop a collective interest in wildlife conservation and environmental sustainability.

== FAO publications ==
Ajayi was a consultant for the Food and Agriculture Organization (FAO) for more than three decades.

- Utilisation of forest wildlife in West Africa. Misc/79/26, Food and Agriculture Organization, Rome, 79 pp.
- Food and animal products from tropical forest: utilization of wildlife and by-product in West Africa. FAO Commission Consultancy Report, FAO, Rome.
- Record of the SADCC mobile training seminar on wildlife management involving people's participation - Botswana, Zambia and Zimbabwe, 4–26 June. Field Document No. 1, FO:/TCP/RAF/8962. Rome, FAO.
- Rural community participation in integrated wildlife management and utilisation in Botswana, Zambia and Zimbabwe (collection of seminar papers). Field Document No. 2, FO:TCP/RAF/8962. Rome, FAO.

== Awards ==
- In June 1994, Ajayi received the "Global 500 Roll of Honor" award of the United Nations Environmental Programme (UNEP) for Outstanding Practical Achievements in Environmental Protection.
- In 2013, Ajayi was conferred by President Goodluck Jonathan with the Nigerian National Order of Merit.

== Fellowship and Membership of Professional Bodies ==
- Fellow of the Zoological Society of London. (F.Z.S.)
- Fellow of the Royal Zoological Society of Scotland" (F.R.Z.S.S.)
- Fellow of the Linnean Society of London (F.L.S)
- Member of the Institute of Biology London. (C.Biol M.I.Biol)
