= Iyara =

Headquarters of Ijumu, the local government

Coordinates: 07°51′00″N 05°57′00″E

Iyara is the headquarters of Ijumu local government area in Kogi State, Nigeria. The zip code for Iyara is 261103. The Iyara people are part of the Okun, which is a Yoruba sub group.

== Notable people ==
- Smart Adeyemi, A Serving senator and a past National President of the Nigerian Union of Journalists from 1999 to 2006.
- Oba Michael Asaju, former president, Nigeria Union of Journalist and late king (Eleta) of Iyara land
- Olu Obanure, Assistant General Overseer of the Redeemed Christian Church of God RCCG.
