= Oworo dialect =

Yoruba dialect of Kogi, Nigeria

Oworo
- Èdè Ọ̀wọ́rọ́ọ̀
- Native to: Nigeria
- Region: Kogi
- Language family: Niger–Congo?: Atlantic–Congo; Volta–Niger; YEAI; Yoruboid; Edekiri; Yoruba; Okun; Oworo

Language codes
- ISO 639-3: –
- Glottolog: awor1241

Oworo (Aworo) is a dialect of Yoruba spoken mainly in Oworo District of Lokoja LGA, Kogi State Nigeria. It is close to the Abinu (Bunu), Ikiri, Owe, Yagba and Ijumu dialects which are together known as Okun. The Okun dialects are mutually intelligible.

There appears to be an obvious and strict rule of change from [F] in Yoruba and other Okun dialects to [H] in Oworo. Similar changes occur with several other vowels and consonants with lesser strictness. For example, the words funfun, ìfẹ́ and òsì meaning white, love and left are rendered hunhun, ìhẹ́ and òhì in Oworo respectively.

Due to the geographical location of the Oworo people, the Oworo dialect has been influenced by Nupe, Igala, Hausa and other neighboring languages. The influence of Nupe seems to be the greatest and this may be due to the 19th century Nupe wars.
