= Sunday Awoniyi =

Nigerian politician (1932–2007)

Chief Sunday Awoniyi CON
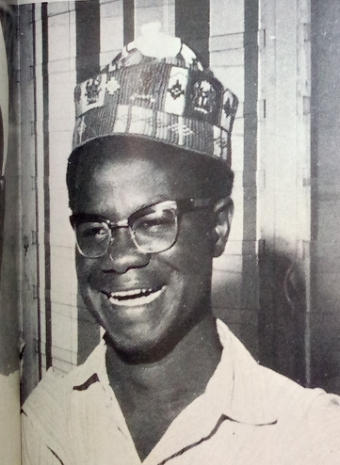

Senator for Kogi West
- In office July 1993 – November 1993

Chairman of the Arewa Consultative Forum
- In office December 2003 – November 2007

Personal details
- Born: 30 April 1932 Mopa-Muro, Northern Region, British Nigeria (present-day Kogi State, Nigeria)
- Died: 28 November 2007 (aged 75) London, United Kingdom
- Party: National Republican Convention (1990–1993); Peoples Democratic Party (1998–2007)
- Spouses: Florence Ebun; Benedicta Omowunmi
- Children: 11, including Abayomi
- Education: Nigeria College of Arts, Science and Technology; University College, Ibadan; Imperial Defence College
- Occupation: Politician

Chief Sunday Bolorunduro Awoniyi CON (30 April 1932 – 28 November 2007) was a Nigerian politician and tribal aristocrat. He was the Aro of Mopa, Kogi State, formerly Kabba Province. Popularly called ''sardauna", Awoniyi was a founding member of the Peoples Democratic Party, from which he was expelled and later recalled. Awoniyi was also chairman of the national executive council of the Arewa Consultative Forum—pan-Northern Nigeria group.

== Family and education ==
Awoniyi was born in what is now the Mopa-Muro Local Government Area of Kogi State to Pa Solomon Iwalaye and Dorcas Omoboja. A Baptist, he attended the First Baptist Church in Ileteju, Mopa. He began his education at Baptist Day School in Mopa from 1938 to 1944, moving on to Holy Trinity School in Lokoja from 1945 to 1946, and Provincial Middle School in Okene from 1947 to 1949. He attended the Nigeria College of Arts, Science and Technology (now Ahmadu Bello University) from 1951 until 1956, University College (now the University of Ibadan) from 1956 to 1959, and the Imperial Defence College (now the Royal College of Defence Studies) from 1970 to 1971.

== Political career ==
=== First Republic ===
Awoniyi's first political appointment was as a District Officer for the British colonial administration (he was one of few Northern Nigerians to hold the post, most being reserved to Britons). After independence in 1960, he held several posts in the Northern Regional Government including that of Secretary to the Executive Council, where he worked with Sardauna Ahmadu Bello, Premier of Northern Nigeria. Awoniyi often held up the assassinated premier as an example of good governance, and was known as "Sardauna Keremi", or "little Sardauna".

=== Third Republic ===
During the Third Republic, Awoniyi was a member of the National Republican Convention (NRC), and was elected to the Senate of Nigeria for the Kogi West district.

=== Fourth Republic ===
Awoniyi was one of the founding members of the People's Democratic Party. He attempted to become chairman in 1999, but was unsuccessful. The party under Chairman Barnabas Gemade expelled him and six others in 2001 for "anti party activities", but reinstated them later that year.

Ever identifying himself as a Northern Nigerian, he later became Chairman of the Arewa Consultative Forum (ACF), a pan Northern Nigerian political organization detested by many Southern Nigerians; questioned about his acceptance of this position, he said he was "brought up in my own part of the world to act well our part wherever we may find ourselves." He held the chairmanship until his death.

Awoniyi opposed the Third Term Agenda proposed by supporters of President Olusegun Obasanjo in favor of his re-election, and was attacked at his Abuja house on 12 March 2006 during the debate. In April 2006, he wrote an open letter to Obasanjo, saying "I beg of you, for your own good and for our country's good, make a simple announcement to say that you are not interested in a Third Term and that you plan to go back to Otta in 2007."

== Family ==
Awoniyi had two wives, Florence Ebun Awoniyi and Benedicta Omowunmi Awoniyi, and eleven children. Among his children is Abayomi Awoniyi, an architect and politician.

== Death ==
On 18 November 2007, while being driven from Abuja to Kaduna, Awoniyi's car flipped over. He was taken to the National Hospital in Abuja and then flown to London, where he died on 28 November.

On 11 December 2007, a one-minute silence honoring him was observed in the Senate. His funeral was held at Mopa on 15 December 2007, and was attended by former heads of state Yakubu Gowon, Ibrahim Babangida, and Abdulsalami Abubakar, and Vice President Goodluck Jonathan, who represented President Umaru Yar'Adua.
