= Ijumu =

Ìjùmú
- LGA
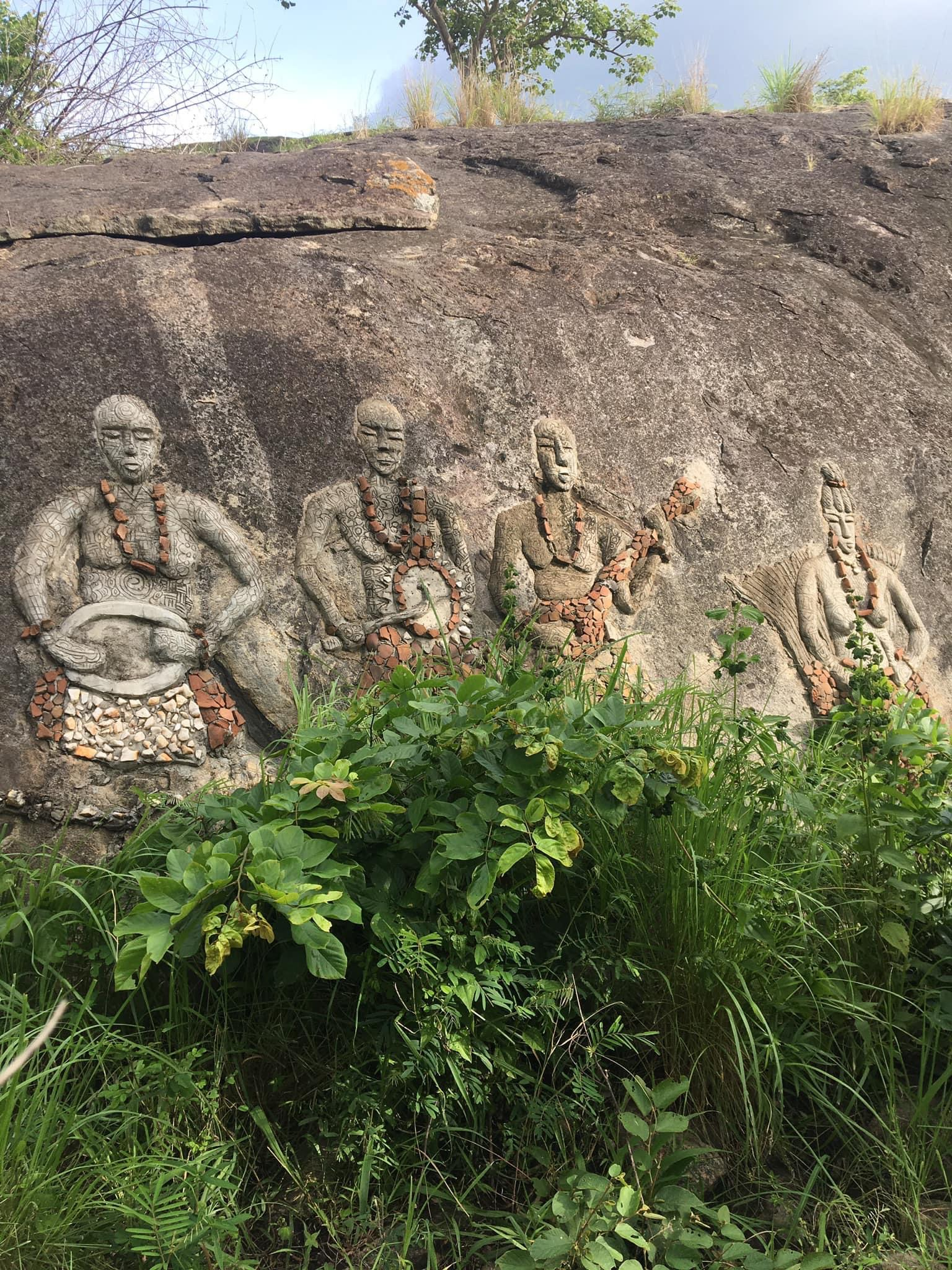
- Art & Gallery at Ijumu
- Interactive map of Ìjùmú
- Location in Nigeria
- Coordinates: 7°51′N 5°58′E
- Country: Nigeria
- State: Kogi State
- Headquarter: Iyara

Government
  - Local Government Chairman: Ibrahim Haruna

Area
  - Total: 1,306 km^{2} (504 sq mi)

Population (2006 census)
  - Total: 119,929
  - Density: 91.83/km^{2} (237.8/sq mi)
- Time zone: UTC+1 (WAT)
- 3-digit postal code prefix: 261
- ISO 3166 code: NG.KO.IJ

Ìjùmú is a Local Government Area in Kogi State, Nigeria. Its headquarters are in the town of Iyara. Other towns in the local government include Ayetoro Gbede, Iyah-Gbede, Ayegunle Gbede, Araromi Gbede, Ayere, Ayeh Gbede, Okoro Gbede, Odokoro Gbede, Ekinrin-Adde, Egbeda Egga, Iyamoye, Ogidi, Ikoyi, Otungba, Oton-Ade, Origa, and others. The people of Ìjùmú speak the Okun dialect of the Yoruba language. The main occupation is farming among men, while women are engaged in trade. Education is the major industry in Ìjùmú.

It has an area of 1,306 km^{2} and a population of 119,929 at the 2006 census.

The postal code of the area is 261.

The current chairman of the local government is Hon. Haruna Ibrahim. The current National President of the Ijumu Development Union (IDU) is Comrade Ahmed-Ade Fatai. He was elected during the IDU Annual Congress at Iyara in December 2024 for a term of two years, taking over from the previous National President, Ọba Kayode Olorunmaiye

== Climate condition ==
Ìjùmú (Kabba area) sits in the tropical savanna (Aw) climate type: it experiences a clearly defined rainy season (roughly April–October) and a dry season (November–March), with annual rainfall concentrated in the middle months. Temperatures are warm to hot for much of the year, and humidity rises markedly during the rainy season.

== Economy ==
Many crops are popularly grown in Ijumu Local government area, including cashew, cocoa, coffee, sweet potatoes, and maize. In addition, a variety of domestic animals, including goats and sheep, are raised nearby. Ijumu Local Government Area (local government area) is home to multiple markets that facilitate the exchange of a diverse range of goods and services among the local populace.

== Languages ==
Ìjùmú is highly linguistically diverse. Some of the local Volta–Niger languages spoken in Ijumu LGA are:

- Ukaan language
- Akpes language (Abesabesi)
- Ahan language
- Ayere language
- Akoko language (Arigidi)

== Notable people ==
- Smart Adeyemi, a Senator representing Kogi West, and a past National President of the Nigerian Union of Journalists from 1999 to 2006.
- S. A. Ajayi, a Nigerian statesman, pioneer politician in old Kabba Province and the founding father of Ijumu Local Government.
- Shola Ameobi, an Ayetoro Gbede born English footballer, playing for Newcastle United as a striker.
- David Jemibewon, a retired Nigerian Army Major-General who served as military governor of the defunct Western State (Aug 1975 – March 1976), as governor of Oyo State after it was created from part of the old Western State (March 1976 -July 1978), and later as Minister of Police Affairs (1999 to 2000).
- Samuel Jemigbon (4 March 1934 – 17 June 2009), was a Christian clergyman who was Chairman of the Lagos, Western/Northern Area Territory and Vice-President of The Apostolic Church Nigeria.
- Dino Melaye, a former Senator of Kogi West District in the National Assembly.
- Nike Davies-Okundaye, also known as Nike Okundaye, Nike Twins Seven Seven and Nike Olaniyi, is a batik and Adire textile designer.
- Bayo Ojo, a former Attorney General of the Federal Republic of Nigeria.
- Folashade Yemi-Esan, a Nigerian civil servant and current head of the civil service of the federation since 28 February 2020.
