= Ogidi, Kogi State =

Town in Kogi State, Nigeria

Coordinates: 7.75996°N 6.02357°E

Ogidi is a Okun town in Kogi State, Nigeria, known for its formations of igneous rock mountains, a traditional art industry, hospitality, valor and a deep tradition of self-reliance.

== Location and history ==
Ogidi is a town in the Ijumu Local Government Area of Kogi State, Nigeria. It is situated in the southwestern part of the former Northern Region, approximately a three-and-a-half-hour drive from the national capital, Abuja.

A significant event in Ogidi's history was its military victory over the Nupe in the late 19th century, successfully resisting their imperial expansion. Despite this conflict, Islam was later introduced to Ogidi not by conquest, but through the peaceful means of trade and social interaction with the Nupe people, who were predominantly Muslim. Christianity arrived in the subsequent period of British colonialism.

Administratively, Ogidi has been part of several jurisdictions: first the Northern Region with its capital at Kaduna; later, Kwara State with its capital at Ilorin; and presently, Kogi State with its capital at Lokoja. It shares boundaries with Kabba in the Kabba/Bunnu LGA, as well as with the towns of Ayere, Iyara (the headquarters of Ijumu LGA), and Ogale.

The town is traditionally ruled by a monarch, the Ologidi. The throne is rotated between the two ruling houses of Itaji and Okelare. The current Oba, HRH Oba Rafiu Oladimeji Sule, is from the Okelare house and succeeded HRH Oba James Adeyemi Are Jegede of the Itaji house.

== Language and traditional economy ==
The language spoken in Ogidi is the Okun dialect of Yoruba. Historically, the men of the community have been farmers and hunters, while the women are known for their involvement in arts, crafts, and trading.

== Religion and society ==
Ogidi is characterized by its religious tolerance, with Muslims, Christians, and traditional worshippers coexisting and collaborating within the community.

== Agriculture ==
The vegetation is a mix of forest and savannah. Coffee, cocoa, cassava, cashew, yam, maize, sweet potato, groundnut, palm kernel and kola are some of the popular produce from the town. Livestock–cattle, goats, sheep, poultry and their products–are also available in Ogidi.

== Religion and tradition ==
The religious landscape of Ogidi includes Islam, Christianity, and indigenous polytheistic beliefs.

The indigenous polytheistic tradition involves a belief in a supreme God, but also attributes supernatural powers to spirits known as "Ebora," which are believed to inhabit local mountains. Adherents may perform rituals to appease or consult these spirits. A central tenet of this belief system is "Otito," or truthfulness; major violations of this moral code are believed to be punishable by the Ebora through "apara," or lightning strikes.

A significant conflict in the late 19th century saw the Ogidi people resist and repel an expansionist campaign by the Nupe. Despite this military victory, Islam was later introduced to Ogidi not by force, but through the peaceful avenues of trade and social interaction with the Nupe people. Christianity arrived later, during the period of British colonialism.

The town is governed by a traditional monarch, the Ologidi, selected from two ruling houses—Itaji and Okelare—on a rotational basis. The current Oba, HRH Oba Rafiu Oladimeji Sule, is from the Okelare house, succeeding HRH Oba James Adeyemi Are Jegede of the Itaji house. This rotational system is a recognized traditional institution within the framework of the Nigerian government.

== Notable people ==
Individuals from Ogidi have achieved prominence in various fields. A sample of them are grouped below for clarity.

=== Public Service ===
Chief S. A. Ajayi (1910-1994) – OFR, JP was a Federal Minister in Nigeria's First Republic and a Nigeria founding father who with other eminent Nigerians fought for/ negotiated Nigeria’s independence. He was a political associate of Premier Ahmadu Bello and led community development projects, including the construction of an Anglican church and primary school. He was the first ogidi/Okun man to wear the prestigious National honor, paving the way for others. He facilitated the establishment of the first rural health care centre in ogidi(on a ground that now hosts the prestigious Ogidi day celebration) commissioned by Sir Ahmadu Bello in 1961, he facilitated the construction of ogidi express road in 1958, he established the community secondary school ogidi in 1977, spear headed legacy projects like the construction of the first community wide pipe borne water in ogidi and the ogidi post office as the president of ogidi development Union. Through scholarships and targeted educational programs, he supported many families in their efforts to raise graduates and break the cycle of limited access to education. In honor of his lasting impact, the S. A. Ajayi Foundation was created by his children to continue his legacy of compassion and service. The foundation supports indigent students through educational scholarships.

Imam Alhaji Haruna (1926-2009) – A prince of the Itaji royal family and community leader who served as the town's Imam. He was a lifelong associate and student of Sheikh Muhammad Kamalud-Deen Al-Adabý. As the Kogi State Chairman of the Ansarul Islam Society of Nigeria, he partnered with the organization to establish educational institutions that provided both Western and Islamic curricula for Muslim children. For Ogidi, he co-led many community development initiatives, including building the central mosque, Ansarul Islam primary school, securing a post office r the town, connecting the town to the national electricity grid, and a community secondary school. He was the first person from Ogidi, and potentially the first from the wider Okun land, to perform the Hajj pilgrimage to Makkah (c. 1960-1962). Hon. Justice Michael Medupin – Retired judge of the Kogi State High Court. He presided over notable cases, including the 2006 arraignment of former Governor Abubakar Audu, and his rulings have been cited in Supreme Court proceedings. Lanre Ipinmisho – Former Director-General of the National Drug Law Enforcement Agency (NDLEA) and Special Adviser on National Drug Control Master Plan (NDCMP). Paul Medupin (deceased) – Former Commissioner of Education in Kogi State. Segun Ajayi-Kadir, mni – Director General of the Manufacturers Association of Nigeria (MAN) and a member of the Nigerian Presidential Economic Coordinating Council.

=== Medicine and Philanthropy ===
- Dr. Ladi Mashood Haroona (1962-2011) – A Nigerian-American pulmonary and critical care specialist and a prince of the Itaji royal family. He was known for his charitable work and was part of a U.S. medical delegation for the 2008 Hajj. During his professional medical training training (at Columbia University's Harlem Medical Center, State University of New York and attendant teaching hospitals), he served as president of the Committee of Interns and Residents. The Imam Haruna Foundation named the LMH Memorial Clinic in Ogidi in his honor.
- Imam Haruna Foundation – A philanthropic organization, now led by Engr. Haruna, that comprehensively continues Imam Haruna's legacy by providing educational support, social services, and maintaining places of religious worship and institutions. The foundation provides free primary healthcare services to everyone through its LMH Memorial Clinic.

=== Arts, Culture, and Sports ===
- Nike Davies-Okundaye – Prominent batik artist and textile designer. Raised in the Itaji royal homestead (mother was a princess), she has held over 100 solo exhibitions globally since her first in 1968. Her work is in permanent collections at institutions including the Smithsonian National Museum of African Art and the Victoria and Albert Museum.
- Sunday Bada (1969-2011) – Olympic silver medalist in the 400 metres at the 2000 Sydney Games and former indoor world champion.
- Twins Seven Seven (1944-2011) – Artist and musician who spent his early years in Ogidi, his mother's hometown.

=== Industry and Commerce ===
- Chief A. A. Ehindero – Retired director of West African Portland Cement (WAPCO).
- Chief G. B. Mesaiyete – Retired senior executive from Nigerian Breweries.
- Engr. A. Haruna - A prince, Canadian trained professional Engineer, Ivy league educated MBA and Harvard trained public leader who is One of the pioneers and Architects of Nigerian IT & Telecom revolution
- Tunde Ipinmisho – Former editor of the Sunday Times.
- Olusola Medupin – Founder of Enish, a chain of Nigerian restaurants with locations in London, Dubai, and Houston.
- Abiodun Medupin – Commercial farmer operating an oil palm plantation and palm oil export business in Ogidi.

== Families and Clans ==
Ogidi comprises several clans that coexist collaboratively. One notable clan is the Idawero, which includes Ipinmisho, Ehindero, Medupin, Owonibi, and Oloruntobi families. This clan has produced numerous prominent figures in law, medicine, and public advocacy.
