= Ayetoro Gbede =

Ayetoro gbede
- Ayetoro gbede
- Coordinates: 7°59′00″N 6°00′00″E
- Country: Nigeria
- State: Kogi State
- Local government: Ijumu

Population
  - Total: 15,000
- Time zone: UTC+1 (WAT (UTC+1))

Ayetoro Gbede (Ayetoro-Gbede) is a town along the Ilorin – Kabba federal highway in Ijumu, a kingdom and local government area in Kogi state, Nigeria. Ayetoro Gbede is located in central Nigeria, approximately 420 kilometers northeast of Lagos, while it is 315 kilometers away from Abuja, the nation's capital. It is 21 kilometers away from Kabba Town. It is in the Kogi west senatorial district and Kabba/Ijumu federal constituency. The town was established over ninety-one years ago. The inhabitants of the town speak their local dialect of Okun and Gbede, which is a Yoruba dialect. The current traditional ruler is Oba Sunday Ehindero.

The first house in Ayetoro Gbede was built beside the old market and was owned by the founder, Oba Ajileye Daniel Alaa Bello. Ayetoro is also blessed with cashew seed, cocoa, vegetables, palm wine, and farming influence. The first community high school in Ayetoro gbede was established in September 1979.

== History ==
Ayetoro-Gbede was founded in 1927 by Oba Ajileye Daniel Alaa Bello who ruled as the first Oba from 1927 until his death on March 27 1964. Oba Alaa was a Christian and as such, used his influence with the missionaries to found the first church in Ayetoro-Gbede - Church Mission(ary) Society (CMS), where he was the Baba Ijo (Church Patron). Oba Alaa founded the town and persuaded many of the smaller neighboring Gbede settlements to join so they could create a bigger town with better economic opportunities and more effective protection from Slave Raiders (a practice that was prevalent at the time). The town consists of 10 communities and is believed to be the largest in the Ijumu Local Government Area of Kogi State.

Unlike many other Okun-Yoruba speaking communities, Ayetoro is one of the few towns with no known traditional festivities or deities being worshipped by the people. This is most likely due to the religious beliefs of its people, with Christian origins as well as the Muslim population.

== Notable people ==
- Shola Ameobi, an Ayetoro Gbede born English footballer, plays for Newcastle United as a striker.
- Dino Melaye, a former Senator of the Federal Republic representing Kogi west constituency.
- John Obaro, Founder Systemspecs.
