= Mopa-Muro =

- LGA
- Interactive map of Mopa-Muro
- Location in Nigeria
- Coordinates: 8°05′50″N 5°53′45″E
- Country: Nigeria
- State: Kogi State
- Headquarter: Mopa

Government
  - Local Government Chairman: Ademola Bello

Area
  - Total: 901 km^{2} (348 sq mi)

Population (2006)
  - Total: 43,760
  - Estimate (2016): 59,100
  - Density: 48.6/km^{2} (126/sq mi)
- Time zone: UTC+1 (WAT)
- 3-digit postal code prefix: 261
- ISO 3166 code: NG.KO.MM

Mopa-Muro is a local government area in Kogi State, Nigeria. Its headquarters are in the town of Mopa on the A123 highway.

It has an area of 901 km^{2} (348 sq mi) and a projected population of 59,100 as of 2016. During the 2006 census, it had a population of 43,760.

The postal code of the area is 261.

== Climate ==
Mopa-Muro is located in Kogi’s humid tropical belt and experiences a long wet season with substantial monthly rainfall from April through October and a hot, drier period from November to March. Typical annual temperature ranges are warm throughout the year, with high humidity during the rainy months.

== Economy ==
Mopa-Moro LGA has a variety of mineral reserves including mica, talc, and limestone. Along with its rich agricultural history, the LGA is well-known for producing a variety of crops including vegetables, melon, cassava, and yam. Mopa-Moro LGA experiences a growth in trade due to the presence of multiple markets that facilitate the interchange of a wide range of goods and services.
