= Nigerian National Assembly delegation from Kogi =

Kogi's delegation in Nigeria's National Assembly

The Nigerian National Assembly delegation from Kogi comprises three Senators representing Kogi Central, Kogi East, and Kogi West, and nine Representatives representing Adavi, Ajaokuta, Ankpa, Bassa, Dekina, Ibaji, Idah, Igalamela-Odolu, Ijumu, Kabba/Bunu, Koton Karfe, Lokoja, Mopa-Muro, Ofu, Ogori/Magongo, Okehi, Okene, Olamaboro, Omala, Yagba East, and Yagba West (the 21 Local Governments of Kogi State).

== Fourth Republic ==
=== 9th Assembly (2019 – present) ===
Senator	Constituency	Party	Remarks
Jibrin Isah Echocho	Kogi East	APC	Supplementary Election
Yakubu Oseni	Kogi Central	APC	
Dino Melaye	Kogi West	PDP	Sacked by Election Petition Tribunal, lost to Smart Adeyemi in a re-run election.
Smart Adeyemi	Kogi West	APC	Elected in a re-run election to replace Dino Melaye whose election was nullified by the court.
Representative	Constituency	Party	
Bello Joseph Asuku	Adavi/Okehi	APC	
Ali Abdullahi Ibrahim	Ankpa/Omala/Olamaboro	APC	
Leke Joseph Abejide	Yagba East/Yagba West/Mopa-muro	ADC	
	Dekina/Bassa		
Zacharias David Idris	Idah/Ibaji/Igalamela/Ofu	APC	
Yusuf Tajudeen	Kabba/Bunu/Ijumu	PDP	
Idrisu Lawal Muhammadu	Ajaokuta	APC	
Yusuf Ahmed Tijani	Okene/Ogori-Magogo	APC	
Shaba Isah Ibrahim	Lokoja / Koton Karfe	PDP	

=== 8th Assembly (2015–2019) ===
Senator	Constituency	Party	Remarks
Air Marshall Isaac Alfa	Kogi East	PDP	Victory at Primaries and General. Mandate wrongly awarded to Attai Aidoko, before final ruling at Supreme Court that saw Alfa declared rightful holder four months to the end of tenure.
Ahmed Ogembe	Kogi Central	PDP	
Dino Melaye	Kogi West	PDP	
Representative	Constituency	Party	
Ajanah Kabir	Adavi/Okehi	APC	
Hassan Omale	Ankpa/Omala/Olamaboro	APC	
Karim Sunday Steve	Yagba East/Yagba West/Mopa-muro	PDP	
Ikani Okolo	Dekina/Bassa	APC	
Egwu Emmanuel	Idah/Ibaji/Igalamela/Ofu	PDP	
Yusuf Ayo Tajudeen	Kabba/Bunu/Ijumu	PDP	
Muhammed Idrisu	Ajaokuta	APC	
Tijani Ahmed Yusuf	Okene/Ogori-Magogo	PDP	
Umar Buba Jibrin	Lokoja / Koton Karfe	PDP	

=== 7th Assembly (2011–2015) ===
Senator	Constituency	Party
Emmanuel Dangana Ocheja	Kogi East	PDP
Nurudeen Abatemi Usman	Kogi Central	PDP
Smart Adeyemi	Kogi West	PDP
Representative	Constituency	Party
Badamasuiy Abdulrahaman	Adavi/Okehi	PDP
Mohammed Ibrahim Idris	Ankpa/Omala/Olamaboro	PDP
Karim Sunday Steve	Yagba East/Yagba West/Mopa-muro	PDP
Tom Ogijo Zakari	Dekina/Bassa	PDP
Ismail Inah Hussein	Idah/Ibaji/Igalamela/Ofu	PDP
Yusuf Ayo Tajudeen	Kabba/Bunu/Ijumu	PDP
Sadiq Asema M.	Ajaokuta	PDP
Tijani Ahmed Yusuf	Okene/Ogori-Magogo	PDP
Umar Buba Jibrin	Lokoja / Koton Karfe	PDP

=== 6th Assembly (2007–2011) ===
Senator	Constituency	Party
Nicholas Ugbane	Kogi East	PDP
Otaru Salihu Ohize	Kogi Central	AC
Smart Adeyemi	Kogi West	PDP
Representative	Constituency	Party
Abdulkarim Saliu	Adavi/Okehi	AC
Atai Usman	Ankpa/Omala/Olamaboro	PDP
Samuel Aro Bamidele	Yagba East/Yagba West/Mopa-muro	PDP
Ihiabe Samson Positive	Dekina/Bassa	PDP
James Idachaba	Idah/Ibaji/Igalamela/Ofu	PDP
Dino Melaye	Kabba/Bunu/Ijumu	PDP
Sadiq Asema M.	Ajaokuta	PDP
Suleiman Y. Kokori Abdul	Okene/Ogori-Magogo	AC
Umar Baba Jibrin	Kogi(Lokoja)Kogi(kk)	PDP

=== 5th Assembly (2003–2007) ===
The following table details the members of the delegation for the 5th Assembly.

Senator	Constituency	Party
Nicholas Ugbane	Kogi East	ANPP
Mohammed Ohiare	Kogi Central	PDP
Jonathon Tunde Ogbeha	Kogi West	PDP
Representative	Constituency	Party
Aliyu Omeiza Saiki	Adavi/Okehi	PDP
Ali Aidoko Atai	Ankpa/Omala/Olamaboro	PDP
Faniyi Joseph Juwon	Yagba	PDP
Isaac Ruzama Jimba	Dekina/Bassa	ANPP
Itaka Frank Ineke	Idah/Ibaji/Igalamela/Ofu	ANPP
Durosinmi Meseko	Kabba/Bunu/Ijumu	PDP
Okina Moses Ado	Ajaokuta	ANPP
Abdulazeez Idris King	Okene/Ogori-Magogo	PDP
Musa Ibrahim Ahmadu	Lokoja / Koton Karfe	PDP

=== 4th Assembly (1999–2003) ===
Senator	Party	Constituency
Ahmed Tijani Ahmed	PDP	Kogi Central
Alex Usman Kadiri	ANPP	Kogi East
Jonathan Tunde Ogbeha	PDP	Kogi West
Representative	Party	Constituency
Abdulkareem Saliu	AD	Adavi/Okehi
Abiodun Ojo Samuel	PDP	Ijumu/Kabba-Bunu
Ineke Itaka Frank	ANPP	Idah/Ofu/Ibaji/Igala-Lamela-Odolu
Jimba Isaac Ruzama	ANPP	Bassa/Dekina
Muazu Abimaje	ANPP	Ankpa Olamaboro Omala
Musa Adamu Osuku	ANPP	Lokoja/Kogi/KK
Olorunshola Ojo	PDP	Yagba East/West/Modamuko
Samari Adamu Ahmadu	ANPP	Ajaokuta
Sani Abdul Stephen E.	PDP	Okene/Ogori/Magongo
