= 2023 Kogi State gubernatorial election =

2023 gubernatorial election in Kogi State, Nigeria

- 11 November 2023
- Turnout: 40.98%
Nominee	Ahmed Usman Ododo	Murtala Ajaka	Dino Melaye
Party	APC	SDP	PDP
Running mate	Salifu Joel	Sam Abenemi	Habeebat Deen
Popular vote	446,237	259,052	46,362
Percentage	57.04%	33.11%	5.93%
- LGA results Ododo: 40–50% 50–60% 60–70% >90% Ajaka: 60–70% 70–80% 80–90% Abejide: 40–50%
Governor before election
Yahaya Bello
APC
Elected Governor
Ahmed Usman Ododo
APC

The 2023 Kogi State gubernatorial election was held on 11 November 2023 to elect the Governor of Kogi State. Incumbent APC Governor Yahaya Bello was term-limited and could not seek re-election to a third term in office. Ahmed Usman Ododo — a former state Auditor-General for Local Government — retained the office for the APC by a margin of 24% over first runner-up and SDP nominee Murtala Ajaka.

The primaries were scheduled to take place between 27 March and 17 April 2022 with the All Progressives Congress nominating Ododo on 15 April while the Peoples Democratic Party nominated former Senator representing Kogi West Dino Melaye on 16 April. On 20 May, Ajaka — a former APC aspirant and national APC official — won the nomination of the Social Democratic Party in a rerun primary.

After collation was completed on the day after the election, INEC declared Ododo as the winner. In the official results, Ododo received 446,000 votes (~57% of the vote) to defeat Ajaka, who received 259,000 votes (33% of the vote) and Melaye, who received 46,000 votes (~6% of the vote). The results were rejected by Ajaka and Melaye, who alleged widespread irregularities, with particular attention focused Adavi, Okehi, and Okene where Ododo received high vote total and votes shares. In the three LGA combined, Ododo received 292,634 votes out of approximately 301,000 votes cast, giving him about 97% of the votes. Although Ajaka initially stated that he would not challenge the results in court, he later filed a petition against the election . The Kogi State Governorship Election Petition Tribunal dismissed his petition in May 2024, and the Court of Appeal upheld the decision in July. The case eventually reached the Supreme Court, which dismissed Ajaka's appeal and affirmed Ododo's election on 23 August 2024..

== Electoral system ==
The Governor of Kogi State is elected using a modified two-round system. To be elected in the first round, a candidate must receive the plurality of the vote and over 25% of the vote in at least two-thirds of local government areas. If no candidate passes this threshold, a second round is held between the top candidate and the next candidate to have received a plurality of votes in the highest number of local government areas.

== Background ==
Kogi State is a diverse state in the North Central with a large number of mineral resources but it faces an underdeveloped agricultural sector, deforestation, and low vaccination rates.

Politically, the state's early 2019 elections were described as a swing towards the APC as the party was mainly successful, unseating almost all PDP senators and House Members to sweep most House of Representatives and two senate seats as the state was won by APC presidential nominee Muhammadu Buhari with over 54% of votes. The House of Assembly election also was a victory for the APC as the party won every seat in the assembly. The November election ended similarly with Bello winning election to a second term and the APC gained a senate seat in a rerun election; however, both elections were riddled with irregularities and electoral violence.

In Bello's second inaugural address in 2020, he declared that his second term would focus on agricultural development, increasing employment, and improving the state's revenue. In terms of his performance Bello was commended for gender inclusion in his cabinet but his term was controversial as he was criticized for allegedly inciting electoral violence, autocratic actions, lies about COVID-19 and vaccines, and further corruption allegations.

== Primary elections ==
The primaries, along with any potential challenges to primary results, will take place between 27 March and 17 April 2022. While no formal zoning agreement is in place, groups from Kogi West Senatorial District (specifically some groups representing the Okun people) have called for the governorship to be zoned to their district with the justification of no elected governor having come from Kogi West beforehand. On the other hand, groups from Kogi Central Senatorial District (specifically some groups representing the Ebira people) are pushing for the office to be retained by their district by claiming that Kogi East Senatorial District held the office for over four terms and thus Kogi Central should as well.

=== All Progressives Congress ===
Ahead of the APC primary, major questions were asked about which candidate would receive the endorsement of Bello to be his successor. However, after the May 2022 primary for federal positions resulted in several losses for Bello loyalists, new questions emerged over Bello's waning control of the state party.

In February 2022, the national APC announced its gubernatorial primaries' schedule, setting its expression of interest form price at ₦10 million and nomination form price at ₦40 million with a 50% nomination form discount for candidates younger than 40 while women and candidates with disabilities get free nomination forms. Both primary forms were sold from 14 to 22 February 2023. The form submission deadline was set for 22 February while candidates would be screened between 24 and 26 February. Ward congresses were set for 8 April in Bayelsa and Imo states to elect delegates for the primary while the Kogi congresses had been held on 8 February. Candidates approved by the screening process advanced to a primary set for 10 April, in concurrence with the other APC gubernatorial primaries; challenges to the result could be made on 12 April.

==== Purchased forms ====
- Smart Adeyemi: Senator for Kogi West (2007–2015; 2019–present)
- Abdulkareem Mohammad Jamiu: Chief of Staff to Governor Bello (2019–present)
- Abiodun Faleke: former House of Representatives member for Ikeja (Lagos State) (2011–present) and 2015 APC deputy gubernatorial nominee
- Jibril Momoh: state Accountant General
- Ahmed Usman Ododo: state Auditor-General for Local Government
- Sanusi Ohiare: former Executive Director of the Rural Electrification Agency
- Yakubu Oseni: Senator for Kogi Central (2019–present)
- Salami Ozigi-Deedat: Commissioner for Local Government and Chieftaincy Affairs
- Murtala Ajaka

==== Declared ====
- Dayo Akanmode

==== Potential ====
- Toba Adebayo: former Bello administration official
- Jibrin Isah: Senator for Kogi East (2019–present) and 2011 and 2015 PDP gubernatorial candidate
- Mukadam Asiru Idris: Commissioner of Finance
- Babatunde Irukera: 2015 and 2019 APC gubernatorial candidate and CEO of the FCCPC
- Khalifa Abdulrahman Okene: 2019 APC Kogi Central senatorial candidate
- Edward David Onoja: Deputy Governor (2019–present)

==== Emerged Winner ====
Ahmed Usman Ododo won the election and emerged flagbearer of the party for the election.

=== People's Democratic Party ===
On 1 December 2022, the national PDP announced its gubernatorial primaries' schedule. Both primary forms—the expression of interest and nomination forms—were sold from 16 to 31 January 2023, aside from Kogi State where the deadline was later extended to 13 February. Similarly, all form submission deadlines were pushed back from 13 February to 1 March. Ward congresses were set for 28-29 March and LGA congresses were rescheduled for 8 April to elect delegates for the primary. Candidates approved by the screening process advanced to a primary set for 14-15 May, in concurrence with all other PDP gubernatorial primaries; challenges to the result could be made in the following days.

==== Purchased forms ====
- Yomi Awoniyi: former Deputy Governor and son of former Senator Sunday Awoniyi

==== Potential ====
- Murtala Ajaka: 2023 SDP gubernatorial Flagbearer His Running mate Sam Abenemi, have both resolved to unite kogites with the slogan ONE KOGI FOR MURISAM. website - www.murisam2023.com, their twitter account @murisam2023, facebook murisam sdp.
- Natasha2019 SDP Kogi Central senatorial nominee
- Abubakar Idris: son of former Governor Ibrahim Idris
- Dino Melaye: 2019 PDP gubernatorial candidate and former Senator for Kogi West (2015–2019)
- Musa Wada: 2019 APC gubernatorial nominee and brother of former Governor Idris Wada

==== Emerged Winner ====
Dino Melaye won the election and emerged flagbearer of the party.

== Controversies ==
- Before voting began on 11 November 2023, YIAGA Africa reported the discovery of pre-filled result sheets at a polling unit in Ogori/Magongo Local Government Area and called on the Independent National Electoral Commission (INEC) to investigate. INEC subsequently confirmed that its senior officials were investigating reports of pre-filled result sheets in Ogori/Magongo, Eika/Ohizenyi and other areas of Kogi State, stating that it would communicate its findings. The incident raised concerns about the integrity of the election process.
- The 2023 Kogi State gubernatorial election was challenged by Social Democratic Party (SDP) candidate Murtala Yakubu Ajaka, who disputed Usman Ododo’s victory, alleging over-voting, non-compliance with the Electoral Act and certificate forgery. Ajaka sought to have Ododo’s victory nullified and to be declared the winner or alternatively, to have a supplementary election conducted in affected polling units. On 27 May 2024, the election petition tribunal dismissed the petition ruling that the allegations had not been established by credible evidence. The Court of Appeal upheld the decision on 11 July 2024.

== Conduct ==
=== Electoral timetable ===
On 25 October 2022, the Independent National Electoral Commission released the timetable, setting out key dates and deadlines for the election.

- 14 November 2022 – Publication of Notice of Election
- 27 March 2023 – First day for the conduct of party primaries
- 17 April 2023 – Final day for the conduct of party primaries, including the resolution of disputes arising from them
- 24 April 2023 – First day for submission of nomination forms to INEC via the online portal
- 5 May 2023 – Final day for submission of nomination forms to INEC via the online portal
- 9 June 2023 – Publication of final nominee list
- 14 June 2023 – Commencement of the official campaign period
- 9 November 2023 – Final day of the official campaign period

== General election ==
=== Results ===
2023 Kogi State gubernatorial election
Party	Candidate	Votes	%
A			
AA	Buraimoh Olayinka		
ADP	Elukpo Julius		
APP			
AAC			
ADC	Leke Abejide		
APM	Isah Dauda		
APC	Ahmed Usman Ododo		
APGA	Ilonah Kingsley		
BP	Muhammed Umar		
LP	Adejo Okeme		
New Nigeria Peoples Party	Musa Mubarak		
NRM			
PDP	Dino Melaye		
PRP			
SDP	Muri Ajaka		
YPP			
ZLP	Fatima Suleiman		
Total votes		782,289	100.00%
Turnout			

=== By senatorial district ===
The results of the election by senatorial district.

Senatorial District	TBD APC		TBD PDP		Others		Total Valid Votes
Senatorial District	Votes	Percentage	Votes	Percentage	Votes	Percentage	Total Valid Votes
Kogi Central Senatorial District (Note: Comprising the local government areas of Adavi, Ajaokuta, Okehi, Okene, and Ogori/Magongo.)	TBD	%	TBD	%	TBD	%	TBD
Kogi East Senatorial District (Note: Comprising the local government areas of Ankpa, Bassa, Dekina, Ibaji, Idah, Igalamela-Odolu, Ofu, Olamaboro, and Omala.)	TBD	%	TBD	%	TBD	%	TBD
Kogi West Senatorial District (Note: Comprising the local government areas of Ijumu, Kabba/Bunu, Kogi, Lokoja, Mopa Muro, Yagba East, Yagba West.)	TBD	%	TBD	%	TBD	%	TBD
Totals	TBD	%	TBD	%	TBD	%	TBD

=== By federal constituency ===
The results of the election by federal constituency.

Federal Constituency	TBD APC		TBD PDP		Others		Total Valid Votes
Federal Constituency	Votes	Percentage	Votes	Percentage	Votes	Percentage	Total Valid Votes
Adavi/Okehi Federal Constituency (Note: Comprising the local government areas of Adavi and Okehi.)	TBD	%	TBD	%	TBD	%	TBD
Ajaokuta Federal Constituency (Note: Comprising the local government area of Ajaokuta.)	TBD	%	TBD	%	TBD	%	TBD
Ankpa/Omala/Olamaboro Federal Constituency (Note: Comprising the local government areas of Ankpa, Olamaboro, and Omala.)	TBD	%	TBD	%	TBD	%	TBD
Bassa/Dekina Federal Constituency (Note: Comprising the local government areas of Bassa and Dekina.)	TBD	%	TBD	%	TBD	%	TBD
Ibaji/Idah/Igalamela/Odolu Federal Constituency (Note: Comprising the local government areas of Ibaji, Idah, and Igalamela-Odolu.)	TBD	%	TBD	%	TBD	%	TBD
Kabba/Bunu/Ijumu Federal Constituency (Note: Comprising the local government areas of Ijumu and Kabba/Bunu.)	TBD	%	TBD	%	TBD	%	TBD
Lokoja Federal Constituency (Note: Comprising the local government area of Lokoja.)	TBD	%	TBD	%	TBD	%	TBD
Okene/Ogori-Magogo Federal Constituency (Note: Comprising the local government areas of Ogori/Magongo and Okene.)	TBD	%	TBD	%	TBD	%	TBD
Yagba East/Yagba West/Mopamuro Federal Constituency (Note: Comprising the local government areas of Mopa-Muro, Yagba East, and Yagba West.)	TBD	%	TBD	%	TBD	%	TBD
Totals	TBD	%	TBD	%	TBD	%	TBD

=== By local government area ===
The results of the election by local government area.

LGA	TBD APC		TBD PDP		Others		Total Valid Votes	Turnout Percentage
LGA	Votes	Percentage	Votes	Percentage	Votes	Percentage	Total Valid Votes	Turnout Percentage
Adavi	TBD	%	TBD	%	TBD	%	TBD	%
Ajaokuta	TBD	%	TBD	%	TBD	%	TBD	%
Ankpa	TBD	%	TBD	%	TBD	%	TBD	%
Bassa	TBD	%	TBD	%	TBD	%	TBD	%
Dekina	TBD	%	TBD	%	TBD	%	TBD	%
Ibaji	TBD	%	TBD	%	TBD	%	TBD	%
Idah	TBD	%	TBD	%	TBD	%	TBD	%
Igalamela-Odolu	TBD	%	TBD	%	TBD	%	TBD	%
Ijumu	TBD	%	TBD	%	TBD	%	TBD	%
Kabba/Bunu	TBD	%	TBD	%	TBD	%	TBD	%
Kogi	TBD	%	TBD	%	TBD	%	TBD	%
Lokoja	TBD	%	TBD	%	TBD	%	TBD	%
Mopa-Muro	TBD	%	TBD	%	TBD	%	TBD	%
Ofu	TBD	%	TBD	%	TBD	%	TBD	%
Okehi	TBD	%	TBD	%	TBD	%	TBD	%
Okene	TBD	%	TBD	%	TBD	%	TBD	%
Olamaboro	TBD	%	TBD	%	TBD	%	TBD	%
Omala	TBD	%	TBD	%	TBD	%	TBD	%
Yagba East	TBD	%	TBD	%	TBD	%	TBD	%
Yagba West	TBD	%	TBD	%	TBD	%	TBD	%
Totals	TBD	%	TBD	%	TBD	%	TBD	%

== See also ==
- 2023 Nigerian elections
- 2023 Nigerian gubernatorial elections
