= 2023 Nigerian presidential election in Kogi State =

- 25 February 2023
- Registered: 1,932,654
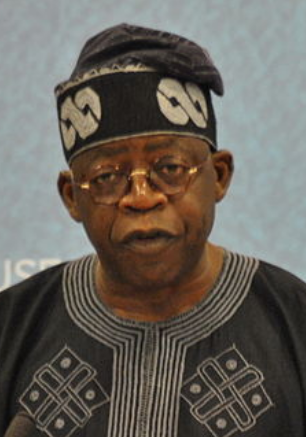

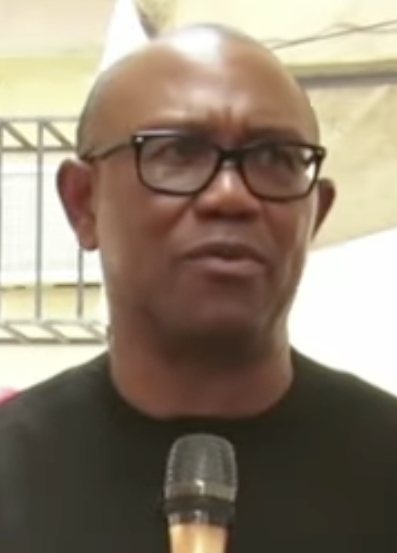

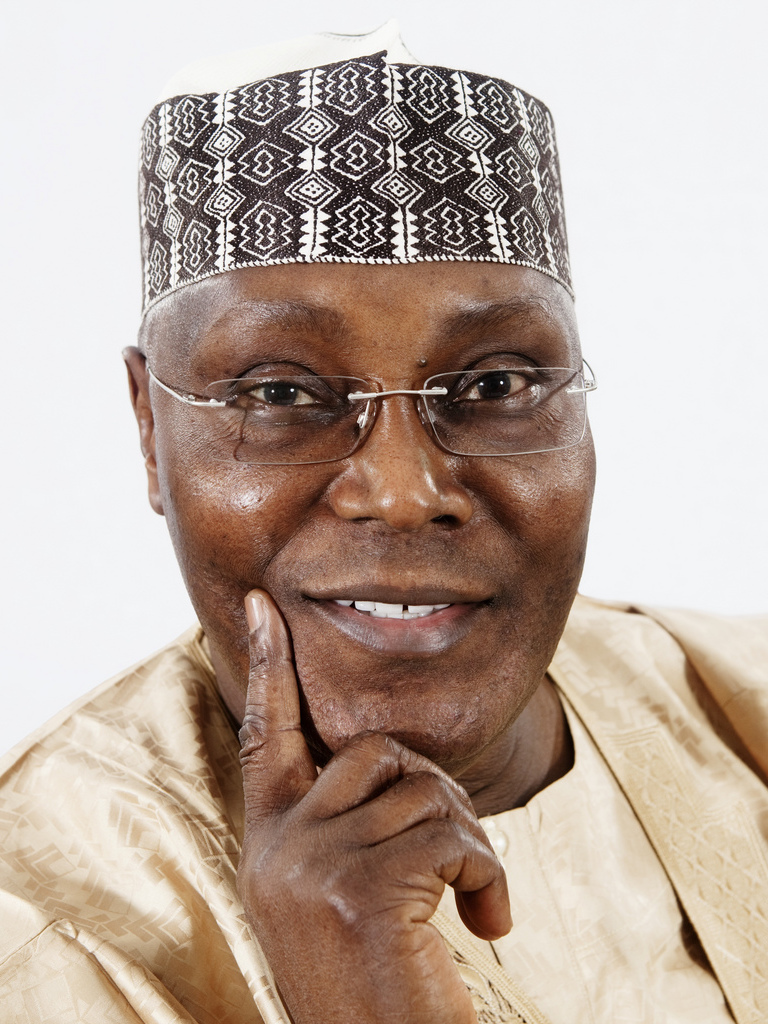
Nominee	Bola Tinubu	Peter Obi
Party	APC	LP
Home state	Lagos	Anambra
Running mate	Kashim Shettima	Yusuf Datti Baba-Ahmed
Nominee	Rabiu Kwankwaso	Atiku Abubakar
Party	New Nigeria Peoples Party	PDP
Home state	Kano	Adamawa
Running mate	Isaac Idahosa	Ifeanyi Okowa
President before election
Muhammadu Buhari
APC
Elected President
TBD

The 2023 Nigerian presidential election in Kogi State was held on 25 February 2023 as part of the nationwide 2023 Nigerian presidential election to elect the president and vice president of Nigeria. Other federal elections, including elections to the House of Representatives and the Senate, were also held on the same date while state elections were held two weeks afterward on 11 March.

== Background ==
Kogi State is a diverse state in the North Central with a large number of mineral resources but facing an underdeveloped agricultural sector, deforestation, and low vaccination rates. Politically, the state's early 2019 elections were described by a swing towards the APC as the party was mainly successful, unseating almost all PDP senators and house members to sweep most House of Representatives and two senate seats as the state was won by APC presidential nominee Muhammadu Buhari with over 54%. The House of Assembly election also was a win for the APC as the party won every seat in the assembly. The November election ended similarly with incumbent Bello winning election to a second term of governor and the APC gained a senate seat in a rerun election; however, both elections were riddled with irregularities and electoral violence.

== Polling ==
Polling organisation/client	Fieldwork date	Sample size					Others	Undecided	Undisclosed	Not voting
Polling organisation/client	Fieldwork date	Sample size	Tinubu APC	Obi LP	Kwankwaso NNPP	Abubakar PDP	Others	Undecided	Undisclosed	Not voting
BantuPage	January 2023	N/A	14%	17%	2%	31%	–	15%	17%	4%
Nextier (Kogi crosstabs of national poll)	27 January 2023	N/A	41.1%	25.7%	–	25.7%	1.4%	5.7%	–	–
SBM Intelligence for EiE (Kogi crosstabs of national poll)	22 January-6 February 2023	N/A	13%	61%	9%	13%	1%	4%	–	–

== Projections ==
Source	Projection		As of
Africa Elects (Note: Africa Elects projections predict the likelihood of a candidate winning a state by categorizing a state as "Safe" for exceedingly likely, "Likely" for somewhat likely, and "Lean" for least likely. If no clear determination could be made, states are categorized as "tossups".)	Tossup		24 February 2023
Dataphyte (Note: Dataphyte projections predict candidates' projected votal shares in each state.)
Dataphyte	Tinubu:	37.73%	11 February 2023
Dataphyte	Obi:	21.55%	11 February 2023
Dataphyte	Abubakar:	22.54%	11 February 2023
Dataphyte	Others:	18.18%	11 February 2023
Enough is Enough- SBM Intelligence (Note: EiE-SBM projections predict which candidates will win states.)	Obi		17 February 2023
SBM Intelligence (Note: SBM projections predict which candidates will win states or, if no determination could be made, categorizes states as "Too close to call" (TCC).)	Tinubu		15 December 2022
ThisDay (Note: ThisDay projections predict candidates' projected votal shares in each state.)
ThisDay	Tinubu:	35%	27 December 2022
ThisDay	Obi:	15%	27 December 2022
ThisDay	Kwankwaso:	5%	27 December 2022
ThisDay	Abubakar:	35%	27 December 2022
ThisDay	Others/Undecided:	15%	27 December 2022
The Nation (Note: The Nation projections predict which candidates will win states or, if no determination could be made, categorizes states as "Battlegrounds.")	Tinubu		12–19 February 2023

== General election ==
=== Results ===
2023 Nigerian presidential election in Kogi State
Party	Candidate	Votes	%
A	Christopher Imumolen		
AA	Hamza al-Mustapha		
ADP	Yabagi Sani		
APP	Osita Nnadi		
AAC	Omoyele Sowore		
ADC	Dumebi Kachikwu		
APC	Bola Tinubu		
APGA	Peter Umeadi		
APM	Princess Chichi Ojei		
BP	Sunday Adenuga		
LP	Peter Obi		
NRM	Felix Johnson Osakwe		
New Nigeria Peoples Party	Rabiu Kwankwaso		
PRP	Kola Abiola		
PDP	Atiku Abubakar		
SDP	Adewole Adebayo		
YPP	Malik Ado-Ibrahim		
ZLP	Dan Nwanyanwu		
Total votes			100.00%
Invalid or blank votes			N/A
Turnout			

==== By senatorial district ====
The results of the election by senatorial district.

Senatorial district	Bola Tinubu APC		Atiku Abubakar PDP		Peter Obi LP		Rabiu Kwankwaso NNPP		Others		Total valid votes
Senatorial district	Votes	%	Votes	%	Votes	%	Votes	%	Votes	%	Total valid votes
Kogi Central Senatorial District (Note: Comprising the local government areas of Adavi, Ajaokuta, Okehi, Okene, and Ogori/Magongo.)	TBD	%	TBD	%	TBD	%	TBD	%	TBD	%	TBD
Kogi East Senatorial District (Note: Comprising the local government areas of Ankpa, Bassa, Dekina, Ibaji, Idah, Igalamela-Odolu, Ofu, Olamaboro, and Omala.)	TBD	%	TBD	%	TBD	%	TBD	%	TBD	%	TBD
Kogi West Senatorial District (Note: Comprising the local government areas of Ijumu, Kabba/Bunu, Kogi, Lokoja, Mopa Muro, Yagba East, Yagba West.)	TBD	%	TBD	%	TBD	%	TBD	%	TBD	%	TBD
Totals	TBD	%	TBD	%	TBD	%	TBD	%	TBD	%	TBD

==== By federal constituency ====
The results of the election by federal constituency.

Federal constituency	Bola Tinubu APC		Atiku Abubakar PDP		Peter Obi LP		Rabiu Kwankwaso NNPP		Others		Total valid votes
Federal constituency	Votes	%	Votes	%	Votes	%	Votes	%	Votes	%	Total valid votes
Adavi/Okehi Federal Constituency (Note: Comprising the local government areas of Adavi and Okehi.)	TBD	%	TBD	%	TBD	%	TBD	%	TBD	%	TBD
Ajaokuta Federal Constituency (Note: Comprising the local government area of Ajaokuta.)	TBD	%	TBD	%	TBD	%	TBD	%	TBD	%	TBD
Ankpa/Omala/Olamaboro Federal Constituency (Note: Comprising the local government areas of Ankpa, Olamaboro, and Omala.)	TBD	%	TBD	%	TBD	%	TBD	%	TBD	%	TBD
Bassa/Dekina Federal Constituency (Note: Comprising the local government areas of Bassa and Dekina.)	TBD	%	TBD	%	TBD	%	TBD	%	TBD	%	TBD
Ibaji/Idah/Igalamela/Odolu Federal Constituency (Note: Comprising the local government areas of Ibaji, Idah, and Igalamela-Odolu.)	TBD	%	TBD	%	TBD	%	TBD	%	TBD	%	TBD
Kabba/Bunu/Ijumu Federal Constituency (Note: Comprising the local government areas of Ijumu and Kabba/Bunu.)	TBD	%	TBD	%	TBD	%	TBD	%	TBD	%	TBD
Lokoja Federal Constituency (Note: Comprising the local government area of Lokoja.)	TBD	%	TBD	%	TBD	%	TBD	%	TBD	%	TBD
Okene/Ogori-Magogo Federal Constituency (Note: Comprising the local government areas of Ogori/Magongo and Okene.)	TBD	%	TBD	%	TBD	%	TBD	%	TBD	%	TBD
Yagba East/Yagba West/Mopamuro Federal Constituency (Note: Comprising the local government areas of Mopa-Muro, Yagba East, and Yagba West.)	TBD	%	TBD	%	TBD	%	TBD	%	TBD	%	TBD
Totals	TBD	%	TBD	%	TBD	%	TBD	%	TBD	%	TBD

==== By local government area ====
The results of the election by local government area.

Local government area	Bola Tinubu APC		Atiku Abubakar PDP		Peter Obi LP		Rabiu Kwankwaso NNPP		Others		Total valid votes	Turnout (%)
Local government area	Votes	%	Votes	%	Votes	%	Votes	%	Votes	%	Total valid votes	Turnout (%)
Adavi	TBD	%	TBD	%	TBD	%	TBD	%	TBD	%	TBD	%
Ajaokuta	TBD	%	TBD	%	TBD	%	TBD	%	TBD	%	TBD	%
Ankpa	TBD	%	TBD	%	TBD	%	TBD	%	TBD	%	TBD	%
Bassa	TBD	%	TBD	%	TBD	%	TBD	%	TBD	%	TBD	%
Dekina	TBD	%	TBD	%	TBD	%	TBD	%	TBD	%	TBD	%
Ibaji	TBD	%	TBD	%	TBD	%	TBD	%	TBD	%	TBD	%
Idah	TBD	%	TBD	%	TBD	%	TBD	%	TBD	%	TBD	%
Igalamela-Odolu	TBD	%	TBD	%	TBD	%	TBD	%	TBD	%	TBD	%
Ijumu	TBD	%	TBD	%	TBD	%	TBD	%	TBD	%	TBD	%
Kabba/Bunu	TBD	%	TBD	%	TBD	%	TBD	%	TBD	%	TBD	%
Kogi	TBD	%	TBD	%	TBD	%	TBD	%	TBD	%	TBD	%
Lokoja	TBD	%	TBD	%	TBD	%	TBD	%	TBD	%	TBD	%
Mopa-Muro	TBD	%	TBD	%	TBD	%	TBD	%	TBD	%	TBD	%
Ofu	TBD	%	TBD	%	TBD	%	TBD	%	TBD	%	TBD	%
Okehi	TBD	%	TBD	%	TBD	%	TBD	%	TBD	%	TBD	%
Okene	TBD	%	TBD	%	TBD	%	TBD	%	TBD	%	TBD	%
Olamaboro	TBD	%	TBD	%	TBD	%	TBD	%	TBD	%	TBD	%
Omala	TBD	%	TBD	%	TBD	%	TBD	%	TBD	%	TBD	%
Yagba East	TBD	%	TBD	%	TBD	%	TBD	%	TBD	%	TBD	%
Yagba West	TBD	%	TBD	%	TBD	%	TBD	%	TBD	%	TBD	%
Totals	TBD	%	TBD	%	TBD	%	TBD	%	TBD	%	TBD	%

== See also ==
- 2023 Kogi State elections
- 2023 Nigerian presidential election
