= 2019 Kogi State gubernatorial election =

2019 gubernatorial election in Kogi State, Nigeria

- 16 November 2019
- Turnout: 37.93%
		PDP
Nominee	Yahaya Bello	Musa Wada
Party	APC	PDP
Running mate	Edward David Onoja	Samuel Aro
Popular vote	406,222	189,704
Percentage	66.51%	31.06%
Governor before election
Yahaya Bello
APC
Elected Governor
Yahaya Bello
APC

The 2019 Kogi State gubernatorial election occurred on 16 November 2019. Incumbent APC Governor Yahaya Bello won re-election for a second term, defeating PDP Musa Wada and several minor party candidates.

Yahaya Bello emerged as the APC gubernatorial candidate after scoring 3,091 votes and defeating his closest rival, Babatunde Irukera, who received 109 votes. He picked Edward David Onoja as his running mate. Musa Wada was the PDP candidate with Samuel Aro as his running mate. 23 candidates contested in the election.

== Electoral system ==
The Governor of Kogi State is elected using the plurality voting system.

== Primary election ==
=== APC primary ===
The APC primary election was held on August 29, 2019 Yahaya Bello won the primary election polling 3,091 votes against 9 other candidates. His closet rival was Babatunde Irukera, a chief executive of the Federal Competition and Consumer Protection Commission who came second with 109 votes, while Hassan Abdullahi Baiwa, member house of representatives came third with 44 votes.

=== Candidates ===
- Party nominee: Yahaya Bello: incumbent governor
- Running mate: Edward David Onoja: incumbent deputy governor
- Babatunde Irukera: chief executive of the Federal Competition and Consumer Protection Commission
- Hassan Abdullahi Baiwa: House of Representatives member
- Yahaya Odidi Audi
- Sani Lulu Abdullahi
- Abubakar Bashir
- Yakubu Mohammed
- Hadiza Ibrahim
- Danlami Umar Mohammed
- Ikele Aisha Blessing

=== PDP primary ===
The PDP primary election was held on September 3, 2019. Musa Wada won the primary election polling 748 votes against 4 other candidates. His closest rival Ibrahim Abubakar came second with 710 votes, Idris Wada, a former governor came third with 345 votes, while Dino Melaye, a Nigerian senator polled 70 votes.

=== Candidates ===
- Party nominee: Musa Wada
- Running mate: Samuel Aro: former member of house of representatives
- Ibrahim Abubakar
- Idris Wada: former governor
- Dino Melaye: Nigerian senator

== Results ==
A total number of 23 candidates registered with the Independent National Electoral Commission to contest in the election.

The total number of registered voters in the state was 1,646,350, while 636,202 voters were accredited. Total number of votes cast was 624,514, while number of valid votes was 610,744. Rejected votes were 13,770.

Candidate	Party	Votes	%
Yahaya Bello	All Progressives Congress	406,222	66.51
Musa Wada	People's Democratic Party	189,704	31.06
Other candidates		14,818	2.43
Total		610,744	100.00
Valid votes		610,744	97.80
Invalid/blank votes		13,770	2.20
Total votes		624,514	100.00
Registered voters/turnout		1,646,350	37.93
Source: Vanguard News

=== By local government area ===
Here are the results of the election by local government area for the two major parties. The total valid votes of 610,744 represents the 23 political parties that participated in the election. Blue represents LGAs won by Yahaya Bello. Green represents LGAs won by Musa Wada.

LGA	Yahaya Bello APC		Musa Wada PDP		Total votes
LGA	#	%	#	%	#
Olamaboro	16,876		8,155		
Idah	4,602		13,962		
Yagba West	7,868		8,860		
Ajaokuta	17,952		5,565		
Mopa-Muro	4,953		3,581		
Okehi	36,954		478		
Yagba East	6,735		7,546		
Koton Karfe	14,097		9,404		
Kabba/Bunu	15,364		8,084		
Okene	112,762		139		
Igalamela-Odolu	8,075		11,195		
Adavi	64,657		366		
Omala	8,473		14,403		
Ijumu	11,425		7,585		
Ogori-Magongo	3,679		2,145		
Bassa	8,386		9,724		
Ankpa	11,269		28,108		
Ofu	11,006		12,264		
Dekina	8,948		16,575		
Ibaji	12, 682		10, 504		
Lokoja	19,457		11,045		
Totals	406,222		189,704		610,744
