= Kogi East senatorial district =

Kogi East senatorial district is the largest of the three senatorial districts in Kogi State, encompassing nine local governments and accounting for 51 percent of the state's total voter population. The district includes Idah, Ibaji, Igalamela/Odolu, Ofu, Dekina, Ankpa, Olamaboro, Bassa, and Omala local governments. Idah is the Headquarters of Kogi East Senatorial District.Senator Jibrin Isah represented the district.

Ethnic groups in Kogi East are Igalas (Majority), Bassas, Igbos and Idomas.

== List of members representing the district ==
| Member | Party | Year | Assembly |
|---|---|---|---|
| Alex Usman Kadiri | ANPP | 1999-2007 | 4th, 5th |
| Nicholas Ugbane | PDP | 2007-2011 | 6th |
| Emmanuel Dangana Ocheja | PDP | 2011-2015 | 7th |
| Attai Aidoko | PDP | 2015-2018 (Note: Aidoko was sacked from the Senate by an Abuja federal High Court in June 2018 for wrongful nomination as the PDP candidate in a primary conducted in Idah on 7 December 2015.) | 8th |
| Isaac Alfa | PDP | 2018-2019 | 8th |
| Jibrin Isah | APC | 2019–present | 9th |
