= 2011 Nigerian Senate elections in Kogi State =

The 2011 Nigerian Senate election in Kogi State was held on April 11, 2011, to elect members of the Nigerian Senate to represent Kogi State. Nurudeen Usman-Abatemi representing Kogi East and Emmanuel Dangana Ocheja representing Kogi Central and Smart Adeyemi representing Kogi West won on the platform of Peoples Democratic Party.

== Overview ==
Affiliation	Party		Total
Affiliation	PDP	ACN	Total
Before Election	2	1	3
After Election	3	0	3

== Summary ==
District	Incumbent	Party	Elected Senator	Party
Kogi East	Nicholas Ugbane	PDP	Nurudeen Usman-Abatemi	PDP
Kogi Central	Smart Adeyemi	PDP	Emmanuel Dangana Ocheja	PDP
Kogi West	Otaru Salihu Ohize	ACN	Smart Adeyemi	PDP

== Results ==
=== Kogi East ===
Peoples Democratic Party candidate Nurudeen Usman-Abatemi won the election, defeating Congress for Progressive Change candidate Dahrum Abdullahi and other party candidates.

2011 Nigerian Senate election in Kogi State
Party	Candidate	Votes	%
PDP	Nurudeen Usman-Abatemi		
CPC	Dahrum Abdullahi		
Total votes			
PDP hold			

=== Kogi Central ===
Peoples Democratic Party candidate Emmanuel Dangana Ocheja won the election, defeating Congress for Progressive Change candidate Edmund Tanor and other party candidates.

2011 Nigerian Senate election in Kogi State
Party	Candidate	Votes	%
PDP	Emmanuel Dangana Ocheja		
CPC	Edmund Tanor		
Total votes			
PDP hold			

=== Kogi East ===
Peoples Democratic Party candidate Smart Adeyemi won the election, defeating Congress for Progressive Change candidate Faniyi T Joseph and other party candidates.

2011 Nigerian Senate election in Kogi State
Party	Candidate	Votes	%
PDP	Smart Adeyemi		
CPC	Faniyi T Joseph		
Total votes			
PDP hold			
