= Hassan Omale =

Nigerian politician

Hassan Omale is a Nigerian politician. He was a member of the Federal House of Representatives, representing Ankpa, Olamaboro and Omala Federal Constituency of Kogi State in the 8th National Assembly.
