= 2019 Nigerian House of Representatives elections in Kogi State =

The 2019 Nigerian House of Representatives elections in Kogi State was held on February 23, 2019, to elect members of the House of Representatives to represent Kogi State, Nigeria.

== Overview ==
Affiliation	Party			Total
Affiliation	APC	PDP	ADC	Total
Before Election	4	4	0	8
After Election	7	0	1	8

== Summary ==
District	Incumbent	Party	Elected Rep	Party
Adavi/Okehi	Muhammed Ajanah	APC	Joseph Bello	APC
Ajaokuta	Muhammed Idirisu	APC	Idirisu Lawal	APC
Ankpa/Omala/Olamaboro	Hassan Omale	APC	Ali Abdullahi Ibrahim	APC
Bassa/Dekina	Ikani Okolo	APC	Abdullahi Hassan	APC
Ibaji/Idah/Igalamela/Odolu	Emmanuel Egwu	PDP	David Idris Zacharias	APC
Kogi (Lokoja)/Kogi (K.K.)	Umar Jibril	PDP	Isah Abdulkareem Usman	APC
Okene/Ogori-Magogo	Yusuf Tijani	PDP	Yusuf Tijani	APC
Yagba East/Yagba West/ Mopamuro	Sunday Karimi	PDP	Leke Joseph Abejide	ADC

== Results ==
=== Adavi/Okehi ===
A total of 16 candidates registered with the Independent National Electoral Commission to contest in the election. APC candidate Joseph Bello won the election, defeating PDP Onimisi Itopa and 14 other party candidates. Bello received 59.32% of the votes, while Itopa received 28.37%.

2019 Nigerian House of Representatives election in Kogi State
Party	Candidate	Votes	%
APC	Joseph Bello	40,085	59.32%
PDP	Onimisi Itopa	19,169	28.37%
Others		8,325	12.32%
Total votes		67,579	100%
APC hold			

=== Ajaokuta ===
A total of 18 candidates registered with the Independent National Electoral Commission to contest in the election. APC candidate Idirisu Lawal won the election, defeating PDP Okino Adeiza and 16 other candidates. Lawal received 53.76% of the votes, while Adeiza received 45.76%.

2019 Nigerian House of Representatives election in Kogi State
Party	Candidate	Votes	%
APC	Idirisu Lawal	12,796	53.76%
PDP	Okino Adeiza	10,891	45.76%
Others		115	0.48%
Total votes		23,802	100%
APC hold			

=== Ankpa/Omala/Olamaboro ===
A total of 20 candidates registered with the Independent National Electoral Commission to contest in the election. APC candidate Ali Abdullahi Ibrahim won the election, defeating PDP Habiba Muhammed Deen and 18 other party candidates. Ibrahim received 48.62% of the votes, while Deen received 33.99%.

2019 Nigerian House of Representatives election in Kogi State
Party	Candidate	Votes	%
APC	Ali Abdullahi Ibrahim	38,398	48.62%
PDP	Habiba Muhammed Deen	26,845	33.99%
Others		13,733	17.39%
Total votes		78,976	100%
APC hold			

=== Bassa/Dekina ===
A total of 14 candidates registered with the Independent National Electoral Commission to contest in the election. APC candidate Abdullahi Hassan won the election, defeating PDP Benjamin Idani Okolo and 11 other candidates. Hassan received 62.62% of the votes, while Okolo received 27.27%.

2019 Nigerian House of Representatives election in Kogi State
Party	Candidate	Votes	%
APC	Abdullahi Hassan	40,735	62.62%
PDP	Benjamin Idani Okolo	17,738	27.27%
Others		6,574	10.11%
Total votes		65,047	100%
APC hold			

=== Ibaji/Idah/Igalamela/Odolu ===
A total of 21 candidates registered with the Independent National Electoral Commission to contest in the election. APC candidate David Idris Zacharias won the election, defeating PDP Emmanuel Egwu and 12 other candidates. Zacharias received 53.23% of the votes, while Egwu received 32.39%.

2019 Nigerian House of Representatives election in Kogi State
Party	Candidate	Votes	%
APC	David Idris Zacharias	44,884	53.23%
PDP	Emmanuel Egwu	27,315	32.39%
Others		12,120	14.37%
Total votes		84,319	100%
APC hold			

=== Kogi (Lokoja)/Kogi (K.K.) ===
A total of 17 candidates registered with the Independent National Electoral Commission to contest in the election. APC candidate Isah Abdulkareem Usman won the election, defeating PDP Shaba Ibrahim and 15 other party candidates. Usman received 51.81% of the votes, while Ibrahim received 46.69%.

2019 Nigerian House of Representatives election in Kogi State
Party	Candidate	Votes	%
APC	Isah Abdulkareem Usman	37,356	51.81%
PDP	Shaba Ibrahim	33,662	46.69%
Others		1,083	1.50%
Total votes		72,101	100%
APC hold			

=== Okene/Ogori-Magogo ===
A total of 20 candidates registered with the Independent National Electoral Commission to contest in the election. APC candidate Yusuf Tijani won the election, defeating PDP Isah Suka Mohammad and 18 other party candidates. Tijani received 96.80% of the votes, while Mohammad received 2.30%.

2019 Nigerian House of Representatives election in Kogi State
Party	Candidate	Votes	%
APC	Yusuf Tijani	371,997	96.80%
PDP	Isah Suka Mohammad	8,857	2.30%
Others		3,453	0.90%
Total votes		384,307	100%
APC hold			

=== Yagba East/Yagba West/Mopamuro ===
A total of 15 candidates registered with the Independent National Electoral Commission to contest in the election. ADC candidate Leke Joseph Abejide won the election, defeating APC Henry Abimbola and 13 other candidates. Abejide received 40.95% of the votes, while Abimbola received 28.93%.

2019 Nigerian House of Representatives election in Kogi State
Party	Candidate	Votes	%
ADC	Leke Joseph Abejide	17,548	40.95%
APC	Henry Abimbola	12,399	28.93%
Others		12,909	30.12%
Total votes		42,856	100%
ADC hold			
