= 2007 Nigerian Senate elections in Kogi State =

2007 Nigerian Senate election in Kogi State

The 2007 Nigerian Senate election in Kogi State was held on April 21, 2007, to elect members of the Nigerian Senate to represent Kogi State. Nicholas Ugbane representing Kogi East and Smart Adeyemi representing Kogi West won on the platform of Peoples Democratic Party, while Otaru Salihu Ohize representing Kogi Central won on the platform of the Action Congress.

== Overview ==
Affiliation	Party		Total
Affiliation	PDP	AC	Total
Before Election			3
After Election	2	1	3

== Summary ==
District	Incumbent	Party	Elected Senator	Party
Kogi East			Nicholas Ugbane	PDP
Kogi West			Smart Adeyemi	PDP
Kogi Central			Otaru Salihu Ohize	AC

== Results ==
=== Kogi East ===
The election was won by Nicholas Ugbane of the Peoples Democratic Party.

2007 Nigerian Senate election in Kogi State
Party	Candidate	Votes	%
PDP	Nicholas Ugbane		
Total votes			
PDP hold			

=== Kogi West ===
The election was won by Smart Adeyemi of the Peoples Democratic Party.

2007 Nigerian Senate election in Kogi State
Party	Candidate	Votes	%
PDP	Smart Adeyemi		
Total votes			
PDP hold			

=== Kogi Central ===
The election was won by Otaru Salihu Ohize of the Action Congress.

2007 Nigerian Senate election in Kogi State
Party	Candidate	Votes	%
AC	Otaru Salihu Ohize		
Total votes			
AC hold			
