= Hassan Abdullahi Baiwa =

Nigerian politician

Member of the House of Representatives
- In office 2015–2023
- Constituency: Dekina/Bassa Federal Constituency

Personal details
- Born: Kogi State, Nigeria
- Party: All Progressives Congress
- Occupation: Politician

Hassan Abdullahi Baiwa is a Nigerian politician who served as the representative for the Dekina/Bassa Federal Constituency in Kogi State during the 8th and 9th National House of Representative, from 2015 to 2023, under the All Progressives Congress (APC). He was a gubernatorial aspirant in the 2023 Kogi State governorship election.

== Early life and education ==
Hassan hails from Kogi State Nigeria and currently serving as the member of the National Assembly representing Dekina/Bassa Federal Constituency under the platform of All Progressives Congress the position he occupied between 2015 and 2023 after winning his election during the 2015 general election.
