= 2003 Nigerian Senate elections in Kogi State =

2003 Nigerian Senate election in Kogi State

The 2003 Nigerian Senate election in Kogi State was held on April 12, 2003, to elect members of the Nigerian Senate to represent Kogi State. Tunde Ogbeha representing Kogi West, Mohammed Ohiare representing Kogi Central and Nicholas Ugbane representing Kogi East all won on the platform of the Peoples Democratic Party.

== Overview ==
Affiliation	Party		Total
Affiliation	PDP	AD	Total
Before Election			3
After Election	3	0	3

== Summary ==
District	Incumbent	Party	Elected Senator	Party
Kogi West			Tunde Ogbeha	PDP
Kogi Central			Mohammed Ohiare	PDP
Kogi East			Nicholas Ugbane	PDP

== Results ==
=== Kogi West ===
The election was won by Tunde Ogbeha of the Peoples Democratic Party.

2003 Nigerian Senate election in Kogi State
Party	Candidate	Votes	%
PDP	Tunde Ogbeha		
Total votes			
PDP hold			

=== Kogi Central ===
The election was won by Mohammed Ohiare of the Peoples Democratic Party.

2003 Nigerian Senate election in Kogi State
Party	Candidate	Votes	%
PDP	Mohammed Ohiare		
Total votes			
PDP hold			

=== Kogi East ===
The election was won by Nicholas Ugbane of the Peoples Democratic Party.

2003 Nigerian Senate election in Kogi State
Party	Candidate	Votes	%
PDP	Nicholas Ugbane		
Total votes			
PDP hold			
