= Abdullahi Ibrahim Ali =

Nigerian politician (born 1964)

Member of the House of Representatives of Nigeria from Kogi
- Incumbent
- Assumed office 11 June 2019
- Preceded by: Hassan Omale
- Constituency: Ankpa/Omala/Olamaboro

Personal details
- Born: 1964 (age 61–62)
- Party: APC
- Profession: Politician

Abdullahi Ibrahim Ali Halims (//; born 1964) is a Nigerian politician who represents Ankpa/Omala/Olamaboro constituency in the House of Representatives of Nigeria, a post he was elected to in 2019. He was the Chairman, House Committee on Steel.

== Political career ==
Ali Halims was elected to the Nigerian National House of Representatives in the general election of 2019 to represent Ankpa/Omala/Olamaboro. During this time he is the Chairman, House Committee on Steel.

On 4 July 2023, Ali Halims was appointed deputy majority leader of the 10th Assembly.
