= Alade =

Rural community

Alade is a rural community in the Igalamela local government area in Nigeria's north central state of Kogi. Alade has oil deposits in commercial quantities. It has vast arable land and forest resources.

== History ==
The Alade community was started in the early 20th century with the migration of the clan people of Ajakogwu who had come from Idah and other communities in search of farm land and other agricultural resources.

== See also ==
- Alade Aminu (born 1987), Nigerian-American basketball player
