= Pius Lasisi Jimoh =

Nigerian politician

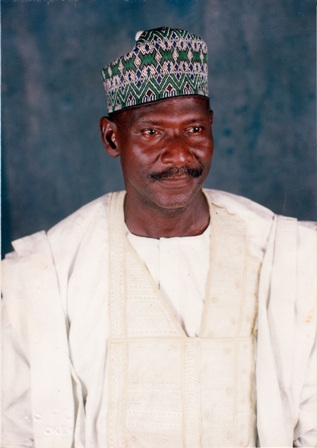
- Senator Pius Lasisi Jimoh's personal photograph

Senator (Deputy Minority Leader)
- In office 20 August 1983 – 31 December 1983
- President: Shehu Shagari
- Preceded by: Isa Abonyi Obaro
- Constituency: Kwara South Senatorial District

Personal details
- Born: 10 February 1950 Adavi-Eba, Adavi Local Government Area of Kogi State
- Died: 29 March 2014 (aged 64) Ageva-Magongo Road
- Cause of death: Automobile crash
- Resting place: Adavi-Eba
- Citizenship: Nigerian
- Party: Great Nigeria People's Party
- Children: Richard Amoto Pius, Christopher Onipe Pius, Bose Blessing Pius, Christian Ovayi Pius, Abigail Ozohu Pius, Adavize Pius, Felix Ozovehe Pius, David Otohinoyi Pius
- Parents: Jimoh Aliyu Simpa (father); Awawu Onyihiengu Jimoh (mother)
- Relatives: Aliyu Ibrahim (The Asema-Upopuvete of Adaviland) Senator Pius Father's younger brother
- Education: St. Paul Anglican Primary School Adavi- Eba
- Alma mater: Ebira Anglican College
- Occupation: Politician cum Businessman
- Profession: Petroleum businessman

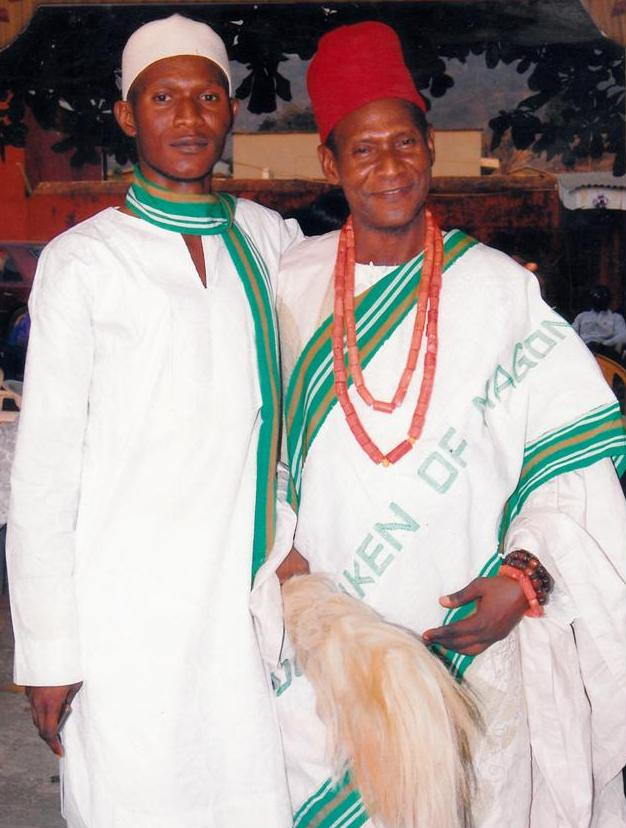
Senator Pius lasisi Jimoh and his eldest son Richard Amoto Pius during his Chieftaincy title ceremony as the OGURIKEN (Developer) of Magongo Land.

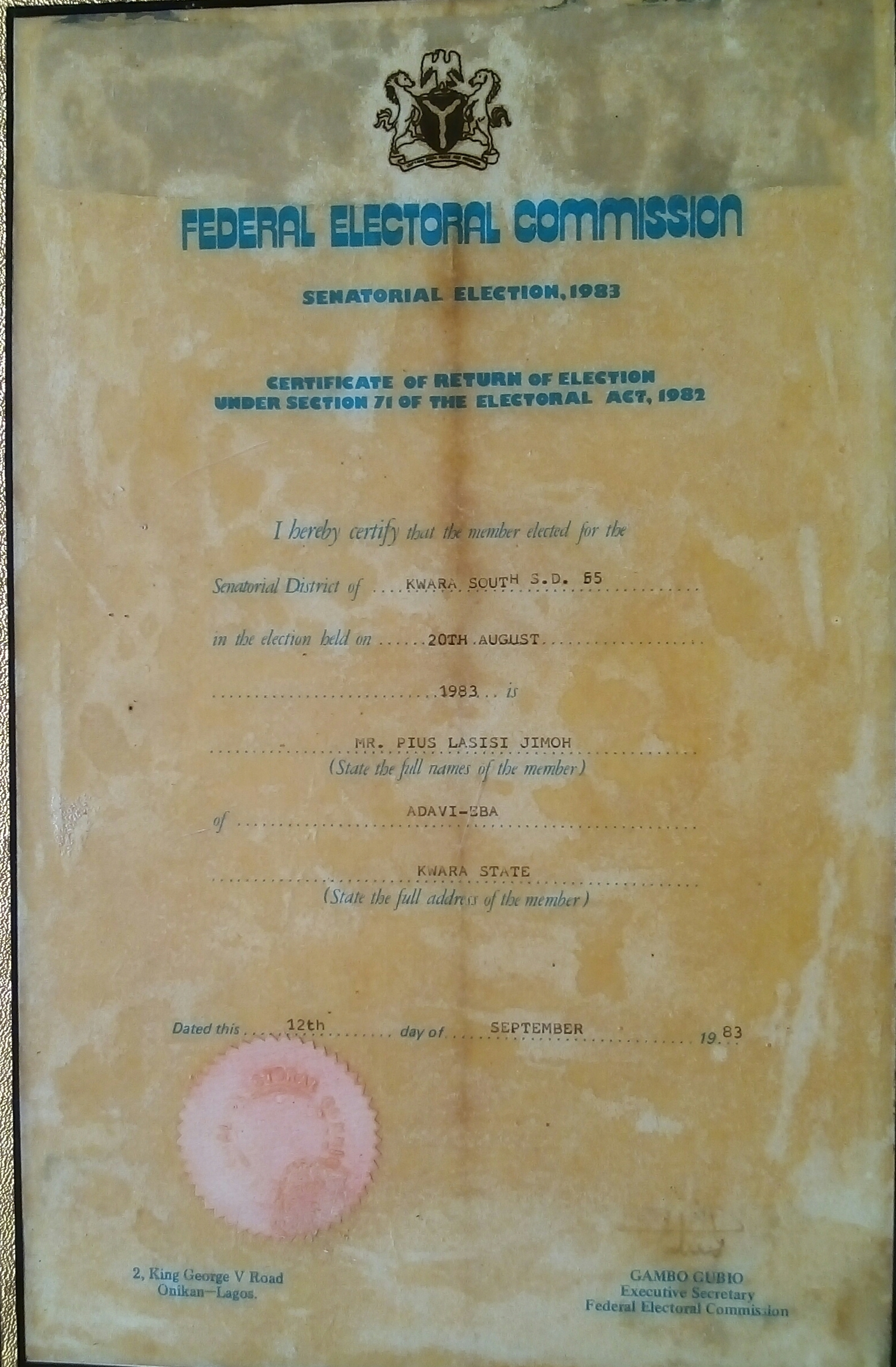
Senator Pius' Certificate of Return of Election as a Senator of the Federal Republic of Nigeria.

Pius Lasisi Jimoh (10 February 1950 – 29 March 2014) was an Ebira born businessman and a Second Republic Senator of the Federal Republic of Nigeria representing the then Kwara South (Okene/Okehi), now Kogi Central Senatorial District from August–December 1983. He was the deputy minority leader and the youngest lawmaker ever elected to the senate at the age of 33. Jimoh was born in Ebira and started his working career with Julius Berger PLC, as a Wages Supervisor between 1974 – 1980.

== Background ==
Pius Jimoh was born on 10 February 1950 into the Ajemora Royal Ruling lineage of Upopuvete Clan in Adavi-Eba, Adavi Local Government Area of Kogi State – an heir to the throne of Asema-Upopuvete of Adavi Land, the paramount traditional leader and chief of Adavi. His father Jimoh Aliyu Simpa was a peasant farmer, a veteran palm fruit harvester and palm wine tapper. Pius Jimoh's mother Awawu Onyihiengu Jimoh was a trader. Pius Jimoh's forefathers and ancestors who migrated from the Jukuns of the Kwararafa kingdom, north of the Benue River and in present-day Taraba State belonged to first generation of pioneer settlers of present-day Adavi and Ebiraland.

Kwararafa people are believed to have migrated from Yemen in Arabia peninsula in the early sixth century AD. Pius Jimoh's clan (Apasi-Upopuvete) is the only clan in Ebiraland that still retains the crocodile as its totem - a totem that is still being associated with the Jukuns of today who are also Kwararafans. Thus, Senator Pius' District (Adavi) is the eldest son of the father (Itaazi) of Ebira, while his Clan (Upopuvete) is the eldest son of the father (Adaviruku) of Adavi.

Senator Pius started his primary education at St. Paul Anglican Primary School Adavi-Eba between 1961 – 1967. He thereafter had his post primary education at the then Ebira Anglican College now known as Lenon Memorial College Ageva, between 1970 – 1974.

== 1983 Kwara South Senatorial Election ==
Pius Jimoh first entered politics when he ran in the 1983 Senatorial election for Kwara South Senatorial District on the Great Nigeria People's Party (GNPP) platform. The incumbent National Party of Nigeria (NPN) Senator Isa Abonyi Obaro lost his re-election bid when he polled 7,992 votes to lose his seat to Pius Lasisi Jimoh who got 147, 175 votes. The UPN candidate in the area, Mr. Zubair Ogereva got 19, 311 votes.

Some political analysts in the area attributed Pius Jimoh's victory to intra-party crisis known as Atta-Saraki feud within the NPN in the Kwara South Senatorial District. However, Pius Jimoh claimed that his victory was not based on any party platform or party crisis but purely because his people reposed confidence in him.

While Pius Jimoh was in the senate, he advocated for the creation of Kogi State so as to save the people he represented from their bondage in Kwara State because they have got nothing to gain from remaining there. He was also a proponent of poll-tax abolition throughout the country saying the piece-meal abolition of the tax by some state governments was not yielding results because people from where it was abolished were forced to pay same in other states while travelling.

Pius Jimoh's tenure was cut short by the December 31st, 1983 coup that brought General Muhammadu Buhari to power.

Senator Pius went back into his petroleum business, a business he established after his resignation from Julius Berger PLC. He was still very active and managing his business before his death on 29 March 2014 in an automobile crash along Ageva-Magongo Road.

== Legacy ==
Pius Jimoh has served his community – Adavi, Ebiraland and the nation in general in various capacities. He served as the president of Adavi-Eba Development Association for a record of eleven years, during which he facilitated various developmental projects in the community including the establishment of Adavi-Eba Community Model College, Adavi-Eba Community Health Centre and extension of water supply throughout the community. Senator Pius was a benefactor to many indigent families and individuals with special emphasis on youth development. He was a detribalized peacemaker who abhorred violence, clannishness and ethno-religious bigotry. Until his passing on Saturday 29 March 2014, he was a member of prestigious and respected Ebira People Association Supreme Council of Elders at the age of 64.

Senator Pius was a devout Christian of the Anglican Communion. Pius Jimoh can be described as one of the pillars of St. Paul's Anglican Church, Adavi-Eba who until his passing on was a member of the Parish Provincial Council (PCC), the Bishop Nominee, founding members of Ebira Anglican Diocese and Chairman of the Church Fund Raising Committee.

== Titles ==
He held various chieftaincy and honorary titles including:

The Traditional Title of Oguriken (Developer) of Magongo Land.

The Onoguvo Iragu (Church Helper) of St. Paul Anglican Church, Adavi-Eba.
