= Alex Kadiri =

Nigerian politician (born 1942)

Director-General of the Federal Ministry of Water Resources
- In office January 1990 – February 1995
- President: Ibrahim Babangida

Senator of the Federal Republic of Nigeria from Kogi East senatorial district
- In office 1999–2007
- Succeeded by: Nicholas Ugbane
- Constituency: Kogi East

Personal details
- Born: Alex Usman Kadiri; June 21, 1942 (age 84) Odu, Dekina LGA, Kogi State, Nigeria
- Party: All Nigeria Peoples Party (ANPP), All People's Party (APP)
- Children: 4

Alex Usman Kadiri (//; born 21 June 1942) is a Nigerian politician who was the senator representing Kogi East senatorial district from 1999 to 2007. In 1981, he was a member of the ASUU Board and Committee and served on the NUC Management Committee between 1983 and 1990. He joined the National Universities Commission [NUC] Lagos, as Assistant Director of Planning in June 1982, and later served as Acting Director of Planning from June 1983. He was appointed Pro-Chancellor and Chairman of Council at the University of Benin in 2003. He entered public service in 1984 as Commissioner for Health and Social Welfare in Benue State. Between August and September 1984, he also acted as Commissioner for Education. In 1985, he was appointed Commissioner for Works, Transport, Housing, Lands and Survey in the same state in I985.

== Early life and education ==
Kadiri was born on 21 June 1942 in Odu, Dekina in Kogi State, Nigeria. He was born into the family of Mallam Abdulkadiri Agbali Oyidi and Mallama Memuna Ageji Abdulkadiri. His academic journey began at a Quranic school, before he enrolled at Native Authority Primary School, Odu Ogboyaga, in January 1952. He studied there until December 1952 when he was subsequently transferred to Q.I.M. School, Aloma from January to December 1958. He moved to N.A. School, Okikili, Dekina in January 1959, and completed his primary education in December 1961. He was a beneficiary of the Igala Native Authority’s scholarship and this enabled him to attend Kabba Provincial Secondary School, Okene, in the former Kabba Province. He gained admission into Provincial Secondary School, Okene (now AbdulAzeez Attah Memorial College) in January 1962, and graduated in December 1966. He then proceeded to Government Secondary School Maiduguri for his Higher School Certificate (HSC), which he completed between January 1967 and December 1968. After a brief time as a Currency Clerk at the Central Bank of Nigeria, Kaduna Branch, he was admitted to the University of Ibadan, where he graduated with degree in Physiology and Human Anatomy. In 1974, he left for the University of Leeds, where he earned his PhD. He later attended the University of Heidelberg, West Germany, from January to December 1981, and George Washington University, USA, in 2002.

== Career ==
=== Academic Career ===
Kadiri began his academic career at the University of Benin as an Assistant Lecturer on 11th July, 1973 where he rose to the rank of Lecturer I in October 1978 and became a Senior Lecturer in October 1981. He joined the National Universities Commission [NUC] Lagos, in June 1982 as Assistant Director of Planning, and later served as Acting Director of Planning from June 1983. He served on the NUC Management Committee between 1983 and 1990. In 1981, he was a member of the ASUU Board and Committee. In 2003, he was appointed Pro-Chancellor and Chairman of Council at the University of Benin.

=== Political Career ===
In February 1984, he entered public service as Commissioner for Health and Social Welfare in Benue State. Between August and September 1984, he also acted as Commissioner for Education. He was appointed Commissioner for Works, Transport, Housing, Lands and Survey in the same state in I985. Later, he was appointed Director General of the Federal Ministry of Water Resources by General Ibrahim Babangida. He was elected Senator of the Federal Republic of Nigeria and represented Kogi East Senatorial District in the Senate between 1999 and 2007.

== Personal life ==
Kadiri was a devout Roman Catholic and a member of the Knights of Saint Mulumba. He married Pauline Osude in Leeds and had four children.

== Death ==
Kadiri passed away on 27th June, 2024 at the age of 82.
