= David Idris Zacharias =

Nigerian politician (born 1972)

Hon Member, Nigeria Federal House of Representatives from Kogi State
- Incumbent
- Assumed office June 11, 2019
- Preceded by: Emmanuel Makoji Egwu
- Constituency: Idah/Ibaji/Igalamela/Ofu Federal Constituency

Personal details
- Born: 27 December 1972 (age 53) Ejule, Ofu LGA, Kogi State
- Party: All Progressives Congress, APC
- Education: University of Abuja
- Occupation: Real Estate Developer, Politician
- Committees: Appropriation, Defence, Industry, Local Content, Ecological Fund and Internally Displaced persons (IDP)
- Website: https://www.nassnig.org

David Idris Zacharias // (born 27 December 1972), is a politician, and member representing Idah, Ibaji, Igalamela Ofu federal Constituency in the Nigeria Federal House of Representatives. He holds membership assignment on the House Committees on Appropriation, Ecological Fund and Internally Displaced Persons (IDP). In September 2019, he supported a motion calling on Nigeria Boundary Commission to resolve the lingering boundary dispute involving his constituents in Ibaji local council of Kogi State and Enugu Otu in Enugu State. He is a business man with major interest in real estate and CEO Eden Multibiz Project Ltd., an Africa proprietary firm. He is a co-founder and chairman of the board of directors, Maina Court Facility Management Services Ltd and founder David Zacharias Foundation, a non-profit humanitarian organization.

== Early life and education ==
Zacharias was born in Ejule, a community in Ofu local council area of Kogi State. He attended a missionary school, St. Martins primary school, Ejule. He holds West African School Certificate Examination – WASCE from Community Secondary School, Ejule, Bachelor of Science – B.Sc degree in Sociology, University of Abuja, he attended Reforming Leadership institution in Abuja.

== Political career ==
In 2015, Zacharias contested for the ticket of All Progressives Congress, APC to run for Idah federal Constituency seat in the Nigeria Federal House of Representatives but lost to his opponent at APC primaries. In 2019 he won his party’s ticket and proceeded to win Idah federal Constituency seat in the National Assembly beating then incumbent Emmanuel Egwu of the People's Democratic Party, PDP at the general elections with clear margin of victory. Emmanuel Egwu not satisfied with his defeat challenged the result of the poll at election petition tribunal asking the court to nullify Zacharias’ victory and declare him (Emmanuel Egwu) the winner of the poll. On August 22, 2019 the three-man tribunal sitting in Wuse Zone 2 Magistrate Court, Abuja unanimously ruled that Zacharias was the rightful winner of the February 2019 poll affirming his electoral victory and struck out Emmanuel Egwu and PDP’s petition. Emmanuel Egwu is challenging the ruling of the tribunal at the court of appeal.

== Humanitarian services ==
Zacharias is a community figure in Kogi State, involved in humanitarian and emergency response services.

=== 2012 flood disaster ===
During the 2012 flood disaster that ravaged hundreds of communities across 24 states in Nigeria including Kogi State, Zacharias was very visible to the victims in his early response providing relief materials to thousands of people sacked by the flood across various communities in Kogi State. To further help cushion the immediate effect of the disaster on the victims he mobilized Life Gate Foundation and Zacharias Foundation which he is the founder and president to mobilise relief materials that were presented to the then Governor Captain Idris Wada for distribution to the victims across the state.

=== Campaign against violent crimes ===
Zacharias is a vocal voice against anti social vices such as thuggery, cultism and other deviant behaviors especially in his native town Ejule.

=== David Zacharias foundation ===
The Zacharias foundation is founded to help the less fortunate fellow citizens on the margin of society to give them hope for survival and confidence for the future. The foundation is providing hundreds of scholarships to secondary school students across the four local council areas of Idah, Ibaji, Igalamela and Ofu that make up Idah federal Constituency for over six years. Young women and widows are benefiting from Zacharias foundation by providing them funds to start small scale businesses. The foundation spending show that it has also given funds to health care and sports related charities as well as religious groups
