= Ocheja =

Nigerian surname

Icheja
- Language: Igala

Origin
- Origin: Kogi
- Meaning: "trustworthy person"
- Region of origin: North Central Nigeria

Other names
- Variant form: Icheje

Ocheja is a Nigerian surname of Igala origin and it means "truthful person" or "trustworthy person".

== Notable people with the surname ==
- Emmanuel Dangana Ocheja - Nigerian lawyer and politician
