= A233 highway (Nigeria) =

Road in Nigeria

Coordinates: 7.56161°N 7.118111°E

Trunk Road A233

Location
- Country: Nigeria

Highway system
- Transport in Nigeria

The A233 highway is a highway in Nigeria. It is one of the east-west roads linking the main south-north roads. (It is named from the two highways it links).

It runs from the A2 highway near Lokoja, Kogi State to the A3 highway at Otukpa, Benue State.
