= Nurudeen Abatemi Usman =

Nigerian politician

Nurudeen Abatemi-Usman is a Nigerian politician and engineer who served as the Senator representing Kogi Central Senatorial District from 2011 to 2015.
