= Idrisu Lawal Muhammadu =

Nigerian politician

Member of the House of Representatives of Nigeria
- In office 2015–2023
- Constituency: Ajaokuta Federal Constituency

Personal details
- Born: April 24, 1957 (age 69) Nigeria
- Party: All Progressives Congress (APC)
- Occupation: Politician

Idrisu Lawal Muhammadu is a Nigerian politician and House of Representatives member for Ajaokuta Federal Constituency Kogi State.

== Early life and education ==
Muhammadu was born on 24 April 1957 in Nigeria. He attended Government Secondary School, Ilorin, where he obtained the West African School Certificate in 1980. He later earned a National Diploma from Taisa College of Technology in 1987. Before entering politics, he worked in the manufacturing industry.

== Political career ==
Muhammadu is a Nigerian politician and a member of the All Progressives Congress (APC). He represented the Ajaokuta Federal Constituency of Kogi State in the House of Representatives of Nigeria from 2015 to 2023. He was first elected in the 2015 general election and was re-elected in 2019 for a second term. During his time in the House of Representatives, he served as Chairman of the House Committee on Population and participated in legislative activities.
