= Joseph Asuku Bello =

Nigerian politician

Joseph Asuku Bello is a Nigerian politician and the lawmaker representing Okehi/Adevi federal constituency of Kogi State in the 9th Assembly.
