= Otaru Salihu Ohize =

Nigerian politician (1953–2016)

Senator of the Federal Republic of Nigeria
- In office 29 May 2007 – 29 May 2011
- Preceded by: Mohammed Ohiare
- Succeeded by: Nurudeen Abatemi Usman
- Constituency: Kogi Central

Personal details
- Born: 5 February 1953 Kogi State, Nigeria
- Died: 30 October 2016 (aged 63) Abuja, Nigeria

Otaru Salihu Ohize (5 February 1953 – 30 October 2016) was a Nigerian politician. He served as Senator for the Kogi Central constituency of Kogi State from 2007 to 2011. He was a member of the Action Congress (AC).

Ohize earned a B.Sc. in political science from the University of Lagos (1987) and a Master of International Affairs & Diplomacy from Ahmadu Bello University, Zaria (2003). He served for fifteen years in the Nigerian Army and Nigerian Navy. He was chairman of Okene Local Government Area of Kogi State for two terms. After taking his seat in the Senate in June 2007 he was appointed to committees on Sports, Police Affairs, Interior Affairs, Information & Media, Housing, Commerce and Agriculture. In a mid-term evaluation of senators in May 2009, ThisDay noted that he had not sponsored any bills. He died at a hospital in Abuja on 30 October 2016.
