= Kogi, Kogi State =

Kogi
- LGA
- Interactive map of Kogi
- Location in Nigeria
- Coordinates: 8°06′N 6°48′E
- Country: Nigeria
- State: Kogi State

Area
  - Total: 1,498 km^{2} (578 sq mi)

Population (2006 census)
  - Total: 115,900
  - Density: 77.37/km^{2} (200.4/sq mi)
- Time zone: UTC+1 (WAT)
- 3-digit postal code prefix: 260
- ISO 3166 code: NG.KO.KO

Kogi is a Local Government Area in Kogi State, Nigeria bounded by Niger State and the Niger River in the west, the Federal Capital Territory in the north, Nasarawa State in the east and the Benue River to its confluence with the Niger in the south. Its headquarters are in the town of Koton Karfe (or Koton Karifi) on the A2 highway.

It has an area of 1,498 km^{2} and a population of 115,900 at the 2006 census.

The postal code of the area is 260.
