= 2019 Kogi State House of Assembly election =

The 2019 Kogi State House of Assembly election was held on March 9, 2019, to elect members of the Kogi State House of Assembly in Nigeria. All the 25 seats were up for election in the Kogi State House of Assembly.

== Results ==
=== Yagba West ===
APC candidate Aderonke Aro won the election.

2019 Kogi State House of Assembly election
Party	Candidate	Votes	%
APC	Aderonke Aro		
APC hold			

=== Yagba East ===
APC candidate Musa Jimoh won the election.

2019 Kogi State House of Assembly election
Party	Candidate	Votes	%
APC	Musa Jimoh		
APC hold			

=== Omala ===
APC candidate Musa Attai Hilarion Collins won the election.

2019 Kogi State House of Assembly election
Party	Candidate	Votes	%
APC	Musa Attai Hilarion Collins		
APC hold			

=== Olamaboro ===
APC candidate Ujah Azewo Anthony won the election.

2019 Kogi State House of Assembly election
Party	Candidate	Votes	%
APC	Ujah Azewo Anthony		
APC hold			

=== Okene II ===
APC candidate Ahmed Dahiru won the election.

2019 Kogi State House of Assembly election
Party	Candidate	Votes	%
APC	Ahmed Dahiru		
APC hold			

=== Okene I ===
APC candidate Mohammed Lawi Ahmed won the election.

2019 Kogi State House of Assembly election
Party	Candidate	Votes	%
APC	Mohammed Lawi Ahmed		
APC hold			

=== Okehi ===
APC candidate Muktar Bajeh won the election.

2019 Kogi State House of Assembly election
Party	Candidate	Votes	%
APC	Muktar Bajeh		
APC hold			

=== Ogori/Magongo ===
APC candidate Akande Oke Moses won the election.

2019 Kogi State House of Assembly election
Party	Candidate	Votes	%
APC	Akande Oke Moses		
APC hold			

=== Ofu ===
APC candidate Amodu Seidu Shehu won the election.

2019 Kogi State House of Assembly election
Party	Candidate	Votes	%
APC	Amodu Seidu Shehu		
APC hold			

=== Mopa-Muro ===
APC candidate Ademola Bello won the election.

2019 Kogi State House of Assembly election
Party	Candidate	Votes	%
APC	Ademola Bello		
APC hold			

=== Lokoja II ===
APC candidate Ndako Idris Muhammed won the election.

2019 Kogi State House of Assembly election
Party	Candidate	Votes	%
APC	Ndako Idris Muhammed		
APC hold			

=== Lokoja I ===
APC candidate Umar Isa Tanimu won the election.

2019 Kogi State House of Assembly election
Party	Candidate	Votes	%
APC	Umar Isa Tanimu		
APC hold			

=== Koton-Karfe ===
APC candidate Abubakar Muhammed Tanko won the election.

2019 Kogi State House of Assembly election
Party	Candidate	Votes	%
APC	Abubakar Muhammed Tanko		
APC hold			

=== Kabba/Bunu ===
APC candidate Kolawole Olushola Mattew won the election.

2019 Kogi State House of Assembly election
Party	Candidate	Votes	%
APC	Kolawole Olushola Mattew		
APC hold			

=== Ijumu ===
APC candidate Kilani Olusola Olumo won the election.

2019 Kogi State House of Assembly election
Party	Candidate	Votes	%
APC	Kilani Olusola Olumo		
APC hold			

=== Igalamela/Odolu ===
APC candidate Atabor Henry Cosmas won the election.

2019 Kogi State House of Assembly election
Party	Candidate	Votes	%
APC	Atabor Henry Cosmas		
APC hold			

=== Idah ===
APC candidate Suleiman Attajachi Musa won the election.

2019 Kogi State House of Assembly election
Party	Candidate	Votes	%
APC	Suleiman Attajachi Musa		
APC hold			

=== Ibaji ===
APC candidate John Monday Ugada Abah won the election.

2019 Kogi State House of Assembly election
Party	Candidate	Votes	%
APC	John Monday Ugada Abah		
APC hold			

=== Okura ===
APC candidate Enema Paul won the election.

2019 Kogi State House of Assembly election
Party	Candidate	Votes	%
APC	Enema Paul		
APC hold			

=== Dekina/Biraidu ===
APC candidate Moses Edoko Ododo won the election.

2019 Kogi State House of Assembly election
Party	Candidate	Votes	%
APC	Moses Edoko Ododo		
APC hold			

=== Bassa ===
APC candidate Daniya Ranyi won the election.

2019 Kogi State House of Assembly election
Party	Candidate	Votes	%
APC	Daniya Ranyi		
APC hold			

=== Ankpa II ===
APC candidate Alfa Momoh Rabiu won the election.

2019 Kogi State House of Assembly election
Party	Candidate	Votes	%
APC	Alfa Momoh Rabiu		
APC hold			

=== Ankpa I ===
APC candidate Ahmed Mohammed won the election.

2019 Kogi State House of Assembly election
Party	Candidate	Votes	%
APC	Ahmed Mohammed		
APC hold			

=== Ajaokuta ===
APC candidate Bello Hassan Abdullahi won the election.

2019 Kogi State House of Assembly election
Party	Candidate	Votes	%
APC	Bello Hassan Abdullahi		
APC hold			

=== Adavi ===
APC candidate Ibrahim Usman won the election.

2019 Kogi State House of Assembly election
Party	Candidate	Votes	%
APC	Ibrahim Usman		
APC hold			
