= Koton Karfe =

LGA in Kogi State, Nigeria

Koton Karfe (Egbura igu) is the headquarters of Kogi Local Government Area in Kogi State, Nigeria and is located on latitude 8.1046°N and longitude 6.7976°E and in the Northern part of the Nigeria between Lokoja and Abuja. Koton Karfe is predominantly inhabited by the Egbura Kotos even though other tribes (Ebiras, Yorubas, Igbos, Bassas, Nupes etc.) can be found in small proportions all over the community. The community's traditional government is overseen by the Ohimegye (saluted Agaba Idu!) and is assisted in governance by his chiefs, prominent men from all over the kingdom. A democratically elected chairman heads the Local Government's Area Council.

== History ==
The Koton Karfe cave, also known as Usi Kwo Kwo Kwo Caves, is an ancient rock shelter in Kogi State, Nigeria, that served as a hiding place for warriors and villagers during past conflicts. It is believed to have been the first office of Lugard in Nigeria and can accommodate about 500 people. Visitors can go on short hikes to the front or longer hikes through the back or to the top, which has two waterfalls.

== Climate condition ==
Koton-Karfe (Kogi LGA) experiences a tropical savanna climate influenced by the West African monsoon: a wet season from around April/May to October and a dry Harmattan-affected season from November to March. Temperatures are consistently warm year-round and rainfall peaks between July and September.
