= Nicholas Ugbane =

Nigerian banker and politician

Nigerian Senator
- In office 2003–2011
- Preceded by: Alex Kadiri
- Succeeded by: Emmanuel Dangana Ocheja
- Constituency: Kogi East

Personal details
- Born: 23 December 1953 (age 72)
- Party: People's Democratic Party (PDP)
- Occupation: Banker
- Profession: Politician

Nicholas Ugbane // (born 23 December 1953) is a Nigerian banker and politician. He was in the Senate of Nigeria between 2003 and 2011 and was the Senator for the Kogi East Senatorial District of Kogi State. He is a member of the People's Democratic Party (PDP). Prior to his senatorial career, Ugbane was the managing director Republic Bank Limited and Honourable Commissioner for: Education, Youth and Sports, Ministry of Commerce and Agriculture and Natural resources.

== Background ==
Nicholas Ugbane was born on 23 December 1953, in Egume, Dekina LGA, of Kogi State. He gained a master's degree in Business Administration (Finance) from Ahmadu Bello University, Zaria. He is a Fellow of the Chartered Institute of Bankers of Nigeria. He was a Senator Elect (UNCP) 25 April 1998. He was appointed Commissioner for Education, Agriculture, Commerce and Industry, Youths and Sports for Kogi State.

== Academic and Professional Qualifications ==
- Master's degree in Business Administration (MBA-JUNE 1981) from Ahmadu Bello University, Zaria
- Business Administration with specialisation in Banking and Finance (Bsc-June 1975) from Ahmadu Bello University, Zaria.
- Associate member of the Institute of management specialists, Warwickshire, England (AMIMS-JUNE 1980)
- Associate member of the chartered institute of Bankers, London (ACIB-SEPTEMBER 1981)
- Associate member of the Nigerian Institute of management (AMNIM-JUNE 1984)
- Fellow, chartered institute of bankers (FCIB-JUNE 1993)

== Bank career ==
- Managing Director February 1993 – March 1994

Republic bank limited, Head office Lagos

- Executive Director (Operations) September 1989 – January 1993

Lobi Bank of Nigeria Limited, Makurdi Benue State

- Division Head (Credit Controller)

Eko International Bank of Nigeria Plc, Lagos

- General Manager's Assistant April 1988 – July 1988

Union Bank of Nigeria Plc, Lagos

- Senior area advances manager July 1984 – April 1986

Union Bank of Nigeria Plc, Lagos Island area office, Lagos

- Senior Relief Manager October 1981 – July 1984

Union Bank of Nigeria Plc, Head Office Lagos

- Financial Analyst

International Merchant Bank Plc (IMB) Victoria Island, Lagos

- Executive Assistant July 1979 – September 1980

Nigeria Merchant Bank limited, Lagos

- Supervisor July 1975 – November 1975

First Bank of Nigeria Plc, Kano

== Political career ==
=== First term (2003-2007) ===
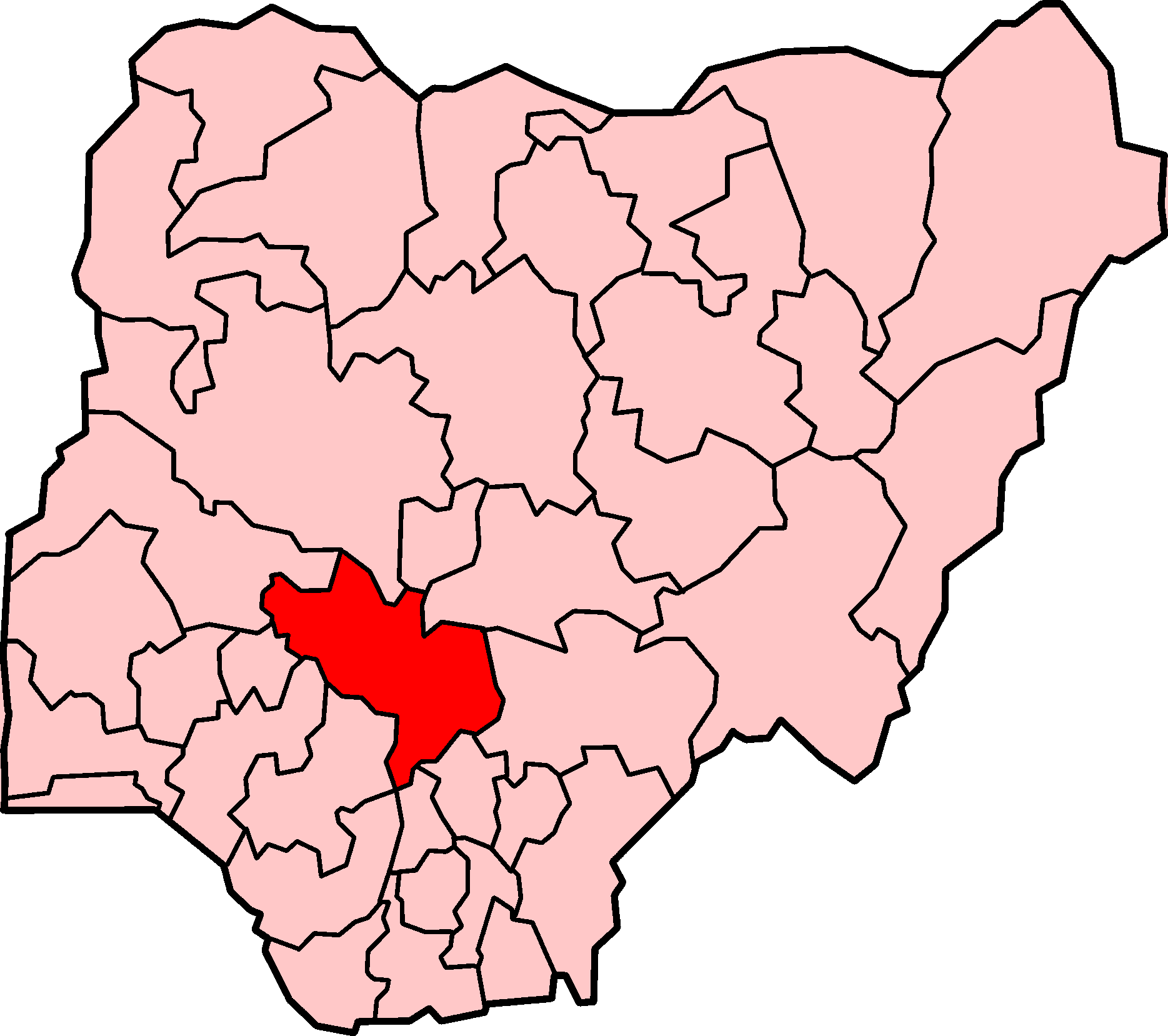
Kogi State in Nigeria

Ugbane was elected to the Senate to represent Kogi East Senatorial District in 2003 representing the All Nigeria People's Party (ANPP). In 2004, he opposed a proposal by the Central Bank of Nigeria to overhaul the categorization of banks into mega, medium and small categories. Following a plane crash in Abuja in October 2006 that killed over 95 people, Ugbane was among Senators that called for the resignation of Aviation minister, Prof. Babalola Borishade.

=== Second term (2007-2011) ===
Ugbane was reelected in 2007 running on the PDP platform. He was appointed to committees on Public Accounts, Niger Delta, Independent National Electoral Commission and Aviation. During a debate over nomination of Senator David Mark as Senate President, Ugbane was considered as an alternative. In May 2007, the Senate resolved to probe the use of funds earmarked for the Independent National Electoral Commission. Ugbane, as Chairman of the Senate Committee on INEC, supported the probe but defended himself against allegations that he had not exercised sufficient oversight.

In 2008, Ugbane was vocal in the campaign against corruption and fraud in the power sector during the period when President Olusegun Obasanjo was in power (1999–2007). In April 2008, Ugbane was a panelist at a conference on developing and supporting critical energy infrastructure in Nigeria. In October 2008, Ugbane was a speaker on developing Nigeria's power structure at the 9th Annual State of the Nigerian Nation Symposium held in Washington, D.C., United States.

In December 2008, Ugbane of Kogi East, which is also the base of Kogi State governor Ibrahim Idris, became involved in a dispute with Senator Smart Adeyemi of Kogi West over nomination of ministers from the state. He stated that nomination of Humphrey Enemakwu Abah for a ministerial position would violate Section 14 of the Nigerian Constitution, which deals with Federal Character. That month Ugbane donated a full classroom block to SS Peter and Paul Academy, Egume in Kogi state.

== Commissioner ==
- Honourable Commissioner, Ministry of Agriculture and Natural Resources Kogi State February 2001 to 2003
- Honourable Commissioner, Ministry of Commerce, Industry and Solid Minerals, Kogi State October 2000 to 2001
- Honourable Commissioner, Ministry of Youth and Sports, Kogi State. April 2000 to October 2000
- Honourable Commissioner, Ministry of Education, Kogi State. July 1999 to April 2000
