= Emmanuel Dangana Ocheja =

Nigerian lawyer and politician

Senator of the 7th National Assembly
- Preceded by: Nicholas Ugbane
- Constituency: Kogi East

Personal details
- Born: April 3 Idah, Kogi State
- Party: All Progressives Congress (January 2015-Date) Peoples Democratic Party (Nigeria) (2001-2014)
- Spouse: Mrs. A.P Ocheja
- Education: Ahmadu Bello University (LLB)
- Occupation: Lawyer
- Profession: Politician, Lawyer
- Website: danganaocheja.com

Emmanuel Dangana Ocheja is a Nigerian Senator who represented Kogi East senatorial district in the National Assembly, and a member of the All Progressives Congress.

Ocheja is the principal of Dangana Global Legal Services (formerly Dangana, Musa & Co), a law firm based in Abuja, Kano and Lagos states in Nigeria.

== Early life and education ==
Ocheja was born in Idah, Kogi State, into the family of Mallam Yusuf Okpanachi Ocheja (father) and Princess Ajuma Ocheja (née Obaje) (mother). He is a member of the royal establishment of the Igala Kingdom as a direct descendant of HRM Aiyegba Oma Idoko (father of Inikpi) through his father. His mother was a sister to a recent past Atta (King) of the Igala Kingdom HRM Dr. Aliyu Obaje, GCFR.

Ocheja enrolled in St. Boniface Primary School in Idah where he obtained his first school leaving certificate. He then proceeded to Our Lady of Schools, Anyigba, Kogi State, for his secondary education. He served as head boy there between 1973 and 1975. He also served as the president of the school's debate society. He enrolled in the diploma in law programme at the Ahmadu Bello University from which he graduated in 1978. He earned his LL.B degree from the same university in June 1981. Ocheja was called to the Nigerian Bar in July 1982 after completing his course at the Nigerian Law School, Victoria Island, Lagos.

== Professional career ==
Ocheja did his National Youth Service Corps (NYSC) at the Faulty of Law at the Ahmadu Bello University in the 1982/1983 session. He joined the Chambers of B.G. Ahmed & Co in 1983 and rose to the position of Head of Litigation. He left the firm in 1986 to start up Dangana, Musa & Co; a private law firm in Kano State. The firm changed its name to Dangana Global Legal Services in 2012. The firm has offices in Abuja (Headquarters), Lagos, and Kano states.

== Political career ==
Ocheja interacting with the people in Idah.

=== 2003 elections ===
In 2003, Ocheja sought the nomination of the Peoples Democratic Party to contest for the governorship seat of Kogi State against the incumbent Prince Abubakar Audu of the All Nigeria Peoples Party. He contested the primaries of the PDP against Senator Ahmed Tijani Ahmed, Alhaji Ibrahim Idris, AVM Isaac Alfa rtd, Senator Alex Kadiri, Engr. Emmanuel Uchola, and a number of other contestants. Alhaji Ibrahim Idris won the primaries and went on to win the general elections in April 2003. After his defeat at the party primaries, Ocheja remained in the Peoples Democratic Party and campaigned for the victory of its candidate, Alhaji Ibrahim Idris, at the polls. Idris named Ocheja a member/secretary of the transition committee that midwifed the transfer of power from Prince Abubakar Audu to his government.

=== Political appointments ===
In 2005, President Olusegun Obasanjo appointed Ocheja to serve as the chairman of the board of directors of the Integrated Data Services Limited (IDSL: A subsidiary of the NNPC). He returned to Kogi State politics in 2008 to serve as the chairman of the state chapter of the Peoples Democratic Party, filling a void that had been created by the ascension of Chief John Odawn into the national ex officio of the party. He was appointed as the Chairman of the Kogi State Local Government Service Commission later in the same year.

=== 2011 elections ===
In late 2010, Ocheja declared his intention to contest elections into the National Assembly of Nigeria to serve as Senator in the 7th session (2011–2015) on the platform of the Peoples Democratic Party. He contested the primary elections against Ambassador Isaac Onu (then Nigerian Ambassador to Botswana), AVM Isaac Alfa (former Chief of Air Staff, 1999–2001), Attai Aidoko Usman (then Chairman of the House of Representatives Committee on the FCT), Barrister Kabiru Mohammed, Abdulrahman Abubakar (former Managing Director of the Nigerian Railway Corporation), Hajiya Halima Alfa, and several others. Ocheja won the party primaries by polling 820 votes to beat Alfa and Onu who polled 543 and 344 votes respectively.

Ocheja also won the general elections against his main challenger Attai Aidoko Usman who flew the flag of the All Nigeria Peoples Party. Hon. Usman had emerged as the ANPP candidate after joining the party upon losing the PDP ticket to Ocheja. In the elections held on 9 April 2011, Ocheja polled 131,386 votes against Hon. Usman's 114,786 votes.

=== Senate career ===
Ocheja took the oath of office as Senator representing Kogi East (Igala/Bassa speaking areas of Kogi State) in the National Assembly on 6 June 2011.

Ocheja in chieftaincy robes (as the Akomu Atta Igala).

President Goodluck Jonathan (as Chairman of Authority of Heads of States of the Economic Community of West African States (ECOWAS) and President of the Federal Republic of Nigeria) administered the oath of office to Senator Ocheja to serve as a member of the Nigerian delegation to the ECOWAS regional parliament on 11 August 2011.

==== Committee appointments ====
In September 2011, Senate President David Mark named Ocheja as the Vice-Chairman of the Senate Committee on the Navy. He was also named as a member of the Senate committees on Defence and Army, Appropriation, Gas, Judiciary, Human Rights and Legal Matters, and Privatisation.

=== 2015 elections ===
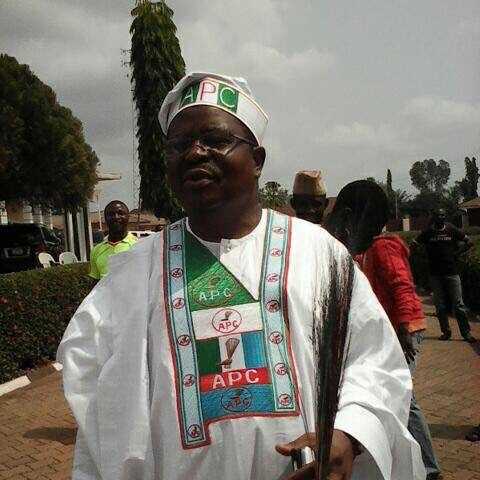
Sen. Ocheja arrives at the 2015 APC presidential campaign rally in Kogi state

Ocheja resigned his membership of the Peoples Democratic Party in 2014 citing his disagreement with certain power blocs within the party as well as poor governance by some political office holders elected on its platform. The resignation confirmed rumors of his displeasure with the PDP establishment that had started in 2012 when he declined an offer extended to him by Governor Idris Ichalla Wada to serve as the Chairman of the Board of the Town Planning Development Authority in Kogi state. He publicly declined requests from his supporters to contest the 2015 senatorial election, choosing instead to focus on expanding his law practice in Abuja. He formally announced his membership of the opposition All Progressives Congress (APC) on 7 February 2015, even though he was known to have joined the party long before then. At the event of his decamping, he pledged to work towards delivering victory to all the candidates seeking electoral offices on the platform of the APC in Kogi State. He was an active participant in the APC presidential campaign in the North Central region of Nigeria for the 2015 elections. He served as the Chairman of the Legal Committee of the All Progressives Congress Presidential, National Assembly, and Governorship election campaigns in Kogi State in 2015.

=== 2019 elections ===
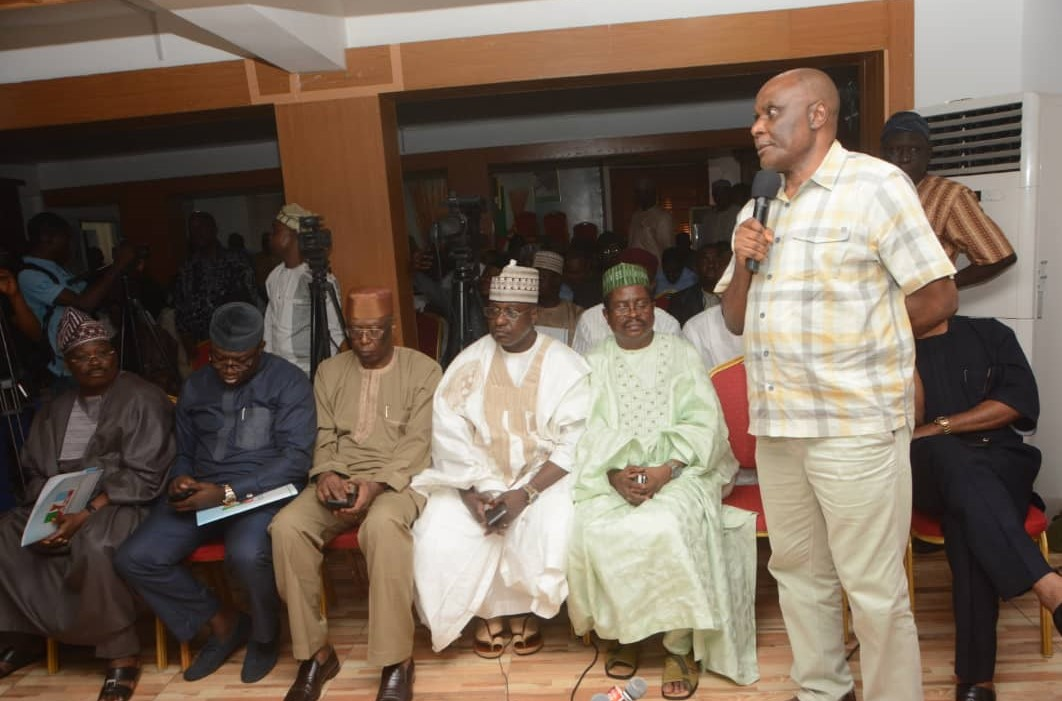
L-R Senator Abiola Ajimobi, Dr.Kayode Fayemi, Senator Oserheimen Osunbor, Ahmed Gulak, Senator Ocheja, Chief Clement Ebri, Ademola Rasaq Seriki, being sworn in as APC committee chairmen

Ocheja did not seek elective office in 2019. He maintained his membership of the APC and campaigned for its candidates throughout Kogi State in the buildup to and during the election. As a believer in President Muhammadu Buhari and his government, Ocheja used several fora to sensitise the electorate in Kogi on why the president had to be re-elected and on the need to vote for APC members into national assembly seats so as to ensure a harmonious and productive relationship between the legislature and the executive arms of government.

In September 2018, Ocheja was sworn in as one of the chairmen of the APC committees for the governorship primaries of the party. He led a team with six other members to conduct the exercise in Taraba State.

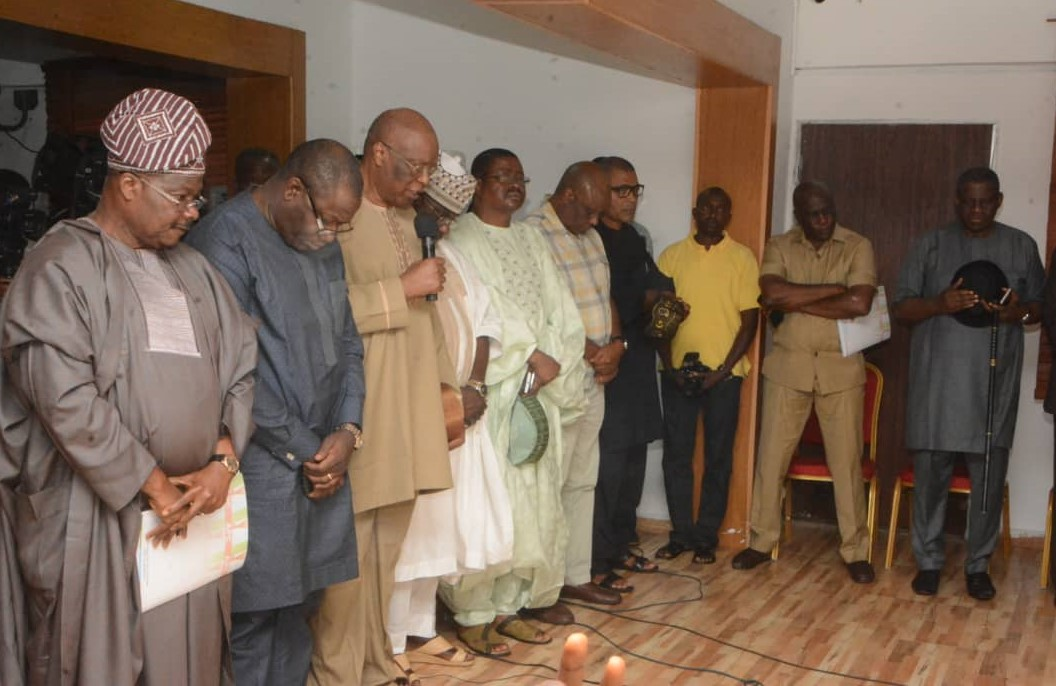
L-R Senator Abiola Ajimobi, Dr.Kayode Fayemi, Senator Oserheimen Osunbor, Ahmed Gulak, Senator Ocheja, Chief Clement Ebri, Ademola Rasaq Seriki, Pius Odubu, and Major Gen. Lawrence Onoja rtd. being sworn in

=== 2023 elections ===
Ocheja was an early supporter of Senator Bola Tinubu's presidential aspiration. Prior to the APC presidential primary election, Ocheja was the Kogi State deputy coordinator of the Tinubu Support Group; an assemblage of Tinubu's supporters across Nigeria. He donated an office building to the group in Idah, Kogi State. Following the emergence of Senator Bola Tinubu as the presidential candidate of the ruling APC, Ocheja intensified his political activities, traversing the breath of Nigeria to sell Tinubu's candidacy. He worked to convince northern Christians like himself to embrace the APC's Muslim-Muslim ticket by urging voters to focus on the positive performance records of the candidates rather than on their religious leaning. Ocheja served as a member of the Presidential Campaign Committee of the APC for the 2023 election. He was also the Director of Finance and Administration (Kogi State) of the Tinubu/Shettima Independent Campaign Council (ICC).

== Recognition ==
Ocheja was turbaned as the "Akomu Atta Igala" by HRM Dr. Aliyu Obaje (the paramount ruler of the Igala Kingdom) on 27 December 2009. At the ceremony, HRM Dr. Aliyu Obaje described Ocheja as a "worthy son of Igala land who had contributed immensely to the development of the area". In Igala traditional circles, Ocheja is saluted with proclamations of "Doga" to signify the title he bears.
