= Ajaokuta =

Ajaokuta Utenyi (Ebira)
- LGA and town
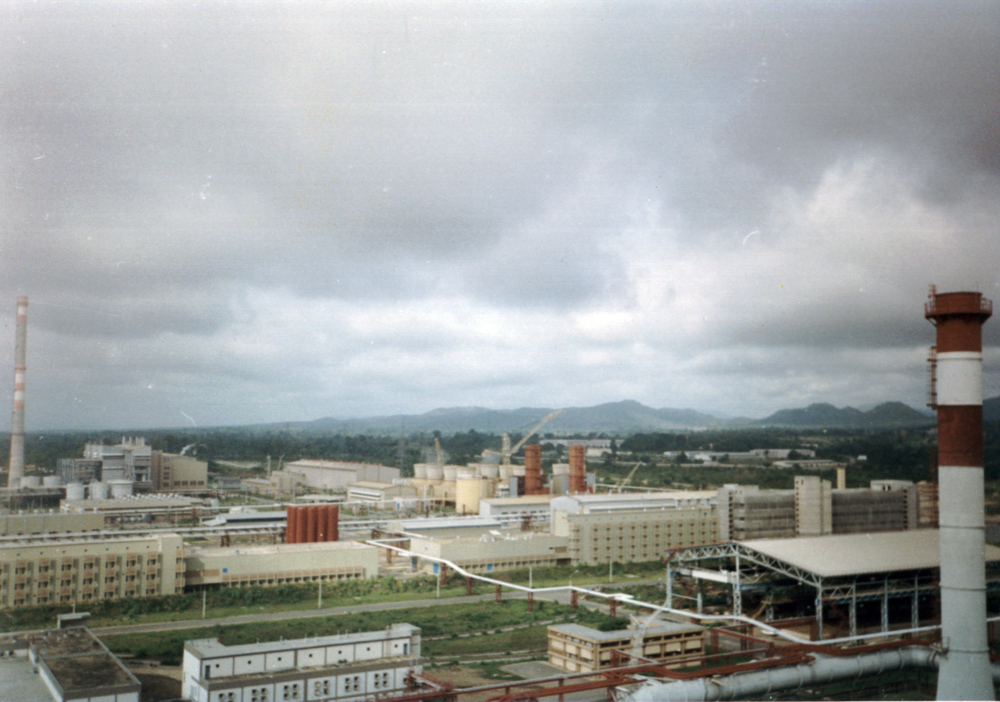
- Unfinished Ajaokuta Steel Rolling Mill
- Interactive map of Ajaokuta
- Location within Nigeria
- Coordinates: 7°33′22″N 6°39′18″E
- Country: Nigeria
- State: Kogi State
- Headquarter: Egayin

Government
  - Local Government Chairman: Haruna Aliyu Ogido

Area
  - Total: 1,362 km^{2} (526 sq mi)

Population (2006 Census)
  - Total: 122,321
  - Density: 89.81/km^{2} (232.6/sq mi)
- Time zone: UTC+1 (WAT)
- 3-digit postal code prefix: 263
- ISO 3166 code: NG.KO.AJ

Ajaokuta is a Local Government Area in Kogi State, Nigeria and a town within it on the left bank of the Niger River. The headquarters of the LGA are in the town of Egayin in the south of the area at 6°40′11″N 8°48′19″E.

It has an area of 1,362 km^{2} and a population of 122,321 at the 2006 census. As of 2008 Ajaokuta, the town, had an estimated population of 16,039.

The postal code of the area is 263.

== Ajaokuta Steel Mill ==
The town is the home of the multibillion-dollar Ajaokuta Steel Mill, the largest steel mill in Nigeria. Begun by the Soviet Union in 1979 under a cooperation agreement with Nigeria, the complex reached 98% completion by 1994. The steelworks have been called the "bedrock of Nigeria’s industrialization". However, the project has been mismanaged, and the steel mill has not produced a single sheet of steel as of December 2017.

== Transport ==
The town is not connected to the Nigerian railway system, except by river. In 1987, a contract was awarded for the construction of a standard gauge railway from the iron mines at Itakpe to the steelworks at Ajaokuta, continuing to the Atlantic Ocean port city of Warri. The Warri–Ajaokuta–Itakpe line is still incomplete as of August 2017, and the section from Itakpe to Ajaokuta has been vandalised. The Nigerian government plans to repair the railway and put it into operation in June 2018.

== Climate ==
The climate is hot and humid, with temperatures ranging from 16 °C (61 °F) to 36 °C (96 °F) during the dry season, and rarely falling above 39 °C (102 °F).

== See also ==
- Railway stations in Nigeria
