= Ogori/Magongo =

- LGA
- Interactive map of Ogori/Magongo
- Location in Nigeria
- Coordinates: 7°29′N 6°13′E
- Country: Nigeria
- State: Kogi State
- Headquarter: Akpafa

Government
  - Local government chairman: Rosemary Ohyezu

Area
  - Total: 79 km^{2} (31 sq mi)

Population (2006 census)
  - Total: 39,622
  - Density: 500/km^{2} (1,300/sq mi)
- Time zone: UTC+1 (WAT)
- 3-digit postal code prefix: 263
- ISO 3166 code: NG.KO.OM

Ogori-Magongo is a Local Government Area in Kogi State, Nigeria. Its headquarters is in Akpafa. It was created from the old Okene Local Government Area for the Ogori and Magongo people. They occupy the land from Obehira Ebeba to Lampese up to Ososo in Edo state. An area of more than 79 km² (31 mi²). A population of 39,622 at the 2006 census.

The postal code of the area is 263.

There are two main towns in the LGA, Magongo and Ogori, which together form the name of the area. People of the area are renowned for their scholarship, hospitality and industry. Important festivals include the nationally acclaimed "Owiya Osese" festival for Magongo, held four weeks after Easter Sunday, while "Ovia Osese" festival for Ogori, is held annually two weeks after Easter. The latter “ Ovia Osese” is officially recognized nationally. The Ogori-Magongo people value their traditional culture, and while they historically believed in other gods, they have now mostly adopted Christianity and Islam, as the major religion and Islam, though the Muslims are less than the Christians. Some historic claims holds that Islam entered Ogori earlier before the Missionaries came with Christianity and a Bible that is written in Yoruba. Magongo is ruled by Olu-Magongo of Magongo, while Ogori is ruled by the Ologori of Ogori land.

The Magongo dialect is Osayen (generally attributed to the use of nasal sound) & that of Ogori which is Oko dialect.

== Climate condition ==
Ogori/Magongo lies in a tropical savanna (Aw) climate zone, with a distinct wet season from about April/May to October and a drier season from November to March; average temperatures are warm year round and the area typically sees its heaviest rains in July–September. Local climate summaries classify Ogori/Magongo as tropical savanna.
