= Adavi, Nigeria =

Adavi
- LGA and town
- Interactive map of Adavi
- Location in Nigeria
- Coordinates: 7°40′N 6°27′E
- Country: Nigeria
- State: Kogi State
- Headquarters: Ogaminana

Government
  - Local Government Chairman: Rasheed Bashiru Okatengwu

Area
  - Total: 718 km^{2} (277 sq mi)

Population (2006 census)
  - Total: 202,194
  - Density: 282/km^{2} (729/sq mi)
- Time zone: UTC+1 (WAT)
- 3-digit postal code prefix: 264
- ISO 3166 code: NG.KO.AD

Adavi is a Local Government Area in Kogi State, Nigeria, adjoining Edo State in the south and the state capital Lokoja in the north. Its headquarters is in the town of Ogaminana near the A123 highway in the southwest of the area at7°36′05″N 6°12′01″E.

It has an area of 718 km^{2} and a population of 202,194 at the 2006 census.

The postal code of the area is 264.

The inhabitants of Adavi are predominantly Ebira. They also speak Ebira language. Among their favourite staple foods are Igorigo (Beniseed), Ipapara (melon), Akara-etupa (groundnut cake), Iya (Pounded Yam), Apaapa (Beans Cake).

== People ==
Adavi is the birthplace of Nigerian politician and businessman, Khalifa Abdulrahaman Okene. Also from Adavi was former Nigerian Senator, Pius Lasisi Jimoh.

== Climate condition ==
Adavi LGA lies within Kogi’s tropical savanna zone and experiences a marked wet season and dry season typical of central Nigeria. Average temperatures are warm year-round (daily highs commonly in the high 20s–low 30s °C [80–89 °F]) while most rainfall falls between April/May and October, with a pronounced peak during the mid-rainy months.
