= Yagba West =

- LGA
- Interactive map of Yagba West
- Location in Nigeria
- Coordinates: 8°15′N 5°33′E
- Country: Nigeria
- State: Kogi State
- Headquarter: Odo Ere

Government
  - Local Government Chairman: Tosun Olokun

Area
  - Total: 1,276 km^{2} (493 sq mi)

Population (2006 census)
  - Total: 149,023
  - Density: 116.8/km^{2} (302.5/sq mi)
- Time zone: UTC+1 (WAT)
- 3-digit postal code prefix: 262
- ISO 3166 code: NG.KO.YW

Yagba West is a Local Government Area in Kogi State, Nigeria, in the west of the state adjoining Kwara State and Ekiti State. Its headquarters is in the town of Odo Ere. It has an area of 1,276 km^{2} and a population of 149,023 at the 2006 census. By 2016, the population grew to 188,900.

Egbe is another prominent town in the Local Government popularised by Christian missionary activities in the early 1900s.

The postal code of the area is 262.

== Climate condition ==
Yagba West experiences a tropical savanna (Aw) climate: a pronounced wet season (roughly April–October) that brings most annual rainfall, and a dry season from November to March. Temperatures are generally warm year-round and the wet season sees higher humidity and frequent convective thunderstorms.
