= Kabba/Bunu =

- LGA
- Interactive map of Kabba/Bunu
- Location in Nigeria
- Coordinates: 8°07′N 6°09′E
- Country: Nigeria
- State: Kogi State
- Headquarter: Kabba

Area
  - Total: 2,706 km^{2} (1,045 sq mi)

Population (2006 census)
  - Total: 145,446
- Time zone: UTC+1 (WAT)
- 3-digit postal code prefix: 261
- ISO 3166 code: NG.KO.KB

Kabba/Bunu is a Local Government Area in Kogi State, Nigeria. Its headquarters are in the town of Kabba on the A123 highway in the southwest of the area at7°49′43″N 6°04′23″E.

It has an area of 2,706 km^{2} (1,045 sq mi) and a population of 145,446 at the 2006 census.

The postal code of the area is 261.

== History ==
- Nairaland

== Languages ==
The people of Kabba/Bunu generally speak Okun which is the language of the Yoruba-speaking community in Kogi State. However, there is a little difference in the way the language is spoken within the Local Government Area. The Kabba people pride themselves as the native speaker of the Owé dialect while those from Bunu district refers to theirs as Èdè Abinu.

== Politics ==
Since Kabba/Bunu comprises two districts (Kabba and Bunu), the Chairmanship position is rotated between the two components with the Deputy Chairmanship position going in the opposite direction.

The incumbent Chairman of the Local Government is Hon. Moses Olorunleke of the All Progressives Congress.

== Climate condition ==
Kabba (the major town in Kabba/Bunu LGA) has a tropical savanna climate (Köppen Aw) with an extended rainy season and a hot, relatively dry season; mean temperatures commonly range in the mid-20s to low 30s °C (77 to 91 °F) and the area receives roughly 1,200–1,400 mm (47–55 in) of rain annually. The rainy months are characterised by frequent afternoon storms and high humidity.
