= Okehi =

- LGA
- Interactive map of Okehi
- Location in Nigeria
- Coordinates: 7°42′N 6°18′E
- Country: Nigeria
- State: Kogi State
- Headquarter: Obangede

Government
  - Local Government Chairman: Monday Amoka Eneji

Area
  - Total: 661 km^{2} (255 sq mi)

Population (2006 census)
  - Total: 199,999
  - Density: 303/km^{2} (784/sq mi)
- Time zone: UTC+1 (WAT)
- 3-digit postal code prefix: 264
- ISO 3166 code: NG.KO.OH

Okehi is a Local Government Area in Kogi State, Nigeria. Its headquarters are in the town of Obangede. It has the following towns under it; Eika, Ihima, Obangede and Usungwe. It has an area of 661 km^{2} and a population of 199,999 at the 2006 census.

The postal code of the area is 264.

== Climate condition ==
Okehi LGA has the two-season pattern common to Kogi: a rainy season (approximately April–October) and a dry season (November–March). Mean annual temperatures are warm (mid-20s °C or 77 °F average), with the wet months substantially more humid and prone to afternoon thunderstorms.
