= Omala, Nigeria =

Omala Ife
- LGA
- Interactive map of Omala
- Location in Nigeria
- Coordinates: 7°49′N 7°31′E
- Country: Nigeria
- State: Kogi State
- Headquarter: Abejukolo
- Established: 1996

Government
  - Type: Local Government Area
  - Executive Chairman: Hon. Mark Ameh Edibo (Mark Noble)APC

Area
  - Total: 1,667 km^{2} (644 sq mi)

Population (2006 census)
  - Total: 108,402
  - Density: 65.03/km^{2} (168.4/sq mi)
- Time zone: UTC+1 (WAT)
- 3-digit postal code prefix: 270
- ISO 3166 code: NG.KO.OM

Omala is a Local Government Area in Kogi State, Nigeria bounded in the north by the Benue River. Its headquarters are in the town of Abejukolo in the north of the area at 7°43′N 7°33′E.

The northeasterly line of equal latitude and longitude passes through the southeast of the LGA.

It has an area of 1,667 km^{2} (644 sq mi) and a population of 108,402 at the 2006 census. As of 2016, the population grew to 145,700.

Most locals are predominantly Igala speaking people with a few being Bassa and Agatu from Benue State. The Igala dialect spoken in Omala is mainly Ife dialect and spoken in all zones except the Olla-Ojaji-Ogodu axis where Akpoto is being spoken.

The postal code of the area is 270.

== History ==
When the Igalas first came from Kwararafa Kingdom, Omala was their entry point, particularly the ancient spiritual town of Otutubatu.

It was at this point the then leader (Atah) of Igala who was too old to continue his journey decided to settle down and charged his younger brother to lead the rest of the tribe southwards on their journey.

Omala's Traditional Head is the Ojogba Onu Ife. Ojogba loosely translated means "he almost became the Atah" steming from the fact that he should have been the ruler of Igala kingdom till date.

Omala Local Government Area was first created in 1982 under the administration of President Shehu Shagari during Nigeria’s Second Republic, when Aper Aku was Governor of the former Benue State.

The movement for its creation was led by Alhaji Sule Iyaji, a prominent political figure who represented Ankpa II – Ife Division in the Benue State House of Assembly from 1979. He later served as Commissioner for Agriculture, and subsequently as Commissioner for Local Government and Chieftaincy Affairs, where he used his office to advocate for the establishment of Omala LGA.

Through the collaboration of the Ife Development Association and the Ogodu Progressive Union, the LGA was created by merging the Ife and Ogodu districts. However, its existence was short-lived following the 1983 military coup that brought Major General Muhammadu Buhari to power.

In 1996, the Omala Local Government Area was re-established under General Sani Abacha as part of a national exercise by the State Creation, Local Government and Boundary Adjustment Committee. Alhaji Sule Iyaji and Pharm. Dr. Ben Ahmodu led the delegation that presented the memorandum for its re-creation, building on the earlier 1982 document. The LGA was officially reinstated on 5 December 1996.

== Traditional Leadership ==
The paramount ruler of Omala is the Onu Ife, traditionally titled Ojogba ki ma ch’ Ata (meaning “But for God, we would have been the Ata of Igala”).

The Ife Kingdom is regarded as one of the earliest and most influential Igala kingdoms, historically connected to Abutu Eje, the progenitor of the Igala race. The Otutubatu deity, a spiritual symbol of authority and protection in the Abutu Eje dynasty, is still located at Amagede in present-day Omala LGA.

== Climate ==
In the town of Abejukolo which is the headquarters of Omala LGA of Kogi state, the rainy season is oppressive and overcast while the dry season is humid and partly cloudy, and it is hot year round. Over the course of the year, the temperature typically varies from 64 °F to 94 °F and is rarely below 58 °F or above 99 °F.

== Economy ==
Omala is endowed with a variety of natural and mineral resources, including crude oil, coal, clay, kaolin, limestone, sharp sand, laterite, timber, and other valuable deposits.

The Bagana Market serves as a major commercial hub, attracting traders from Benue, Enugu, Nasarawa, Kogi, and other states. Trade-by-barter is still practiced in the market, and the Bagana smoked fish is a renowned local delicacy due to its taste and quality.

== Tourism and Heritage Sites ==
Omala LGA hosts several natural and historical attractions of cultural and tourism potential:

1. Bagana Community

- River Benue and its aquatic features
- The over 100-year-old John Holt (Royal Niger Company) warehouse
- Ojuwo Ajenefu (the “White Man’s Hill”)
- Ojeda Island on the River Benue
- Efite community fishing site

2. Amagede Community (Bagana District)

- Otutubatu Spirit Deity of the Igala ancestors
- Burial site of Abutu Eje, the progenitor of the Igala Kingdom

3. Obakume and Ajomakoji Communities

- Ijologu Deity at Ajomakoji
- Kokoma Cultural Group of Obakume

4. Idrisu Community

- Ojuwo Ugwechi Hill, a historical site
- Original site of the ancestral Okwute of the Ihekpe Clan, later moved to Echa after being reclaimed from European collectors due to associated misfortunes

5. Agojeju-Odo Community

- Abukpe Mystery Pond
- Akpa Ch’Oja Stone Deity
- Oche River, where three rivers converge

6. Okpotala Community

- Oko Odo Wildlife and Game Reserve
- Oche River, serving as a natural boundary between the Agatu and Igala peoples

7. Opada Community

- Opada Wildlife and Game Reserve

8. Igah-Onife

- Burial site of former Ojogbas
- The Okwute (ancestral stone) of the Ojogba stool

9. Abejukolo-Ife (Headquarters)

- Omala River
- Aji Kolo, from which the town derives its name
- Akpa Deity of the Omala River
- Ancient Ojogba Palace

== Wards ==
- Abejukolo Ward I
- Abejukolo Ward II
- Agbenema/Ofejiji Ward
- Bagaji Ward
- Bagana Ward
- Ibado/Akpacha Ward
- Icheke Ward
- Ogodu Ward
- Olla Ward
- Ojaji Ward
- Okpatala Ward

== Notable people ==
- Alhaji Ibrahim Idris
