= Ofu, Nigeria =

Local government area in Kogi State, Nigeria

Ofu
- LGA
- Interactive map of Ofu
- Location in Nigeria
- Coordinates: 7°20′N 7°05′E
- Country: Nigeria
- State: Kogi State
- Headquarter: Gwalawo

Government
  - Local Government Chairman: Hassan Atawodi

Area
  - Total: 1,680 km^{2} (650 sq mi)

Population (2006 census)
  - Total: 192,169
  - Density: 114/km^{2} (296/sq mi)
- Time zone: UTC+1 (WAT)
- 3-digit postal code prefix: 271
- ISO 3166 code: NG.KO.OF

Ofu is a Local Government Area in the central part of Kogi State, Federal Republic of Nigeria, the Niger River forming its western boundary. Its headquarters are in the town of Ogwoawo (or Ugwalawo or Gwalawo) to the south of the area at 7°14′09″N 6°55′32″E.

The northeasterly line of equal latitude and longitude passes through the LGA.

It has an area of 1,680 km^{2} and a population of 192,169 at the 2006 census.

The postal code of the area is 271.

== Places in Ofu ==
Below are the list of cities, towns and villages in Ofu, Kogi, Nigeria

- Adoma
- Agojeju
- Akopo
- Akpopo
- Akunuba
- Alo
- Alode
- Alogi
- Alokura
- Araba
- Ayanka
- Efaku
- Egbala
- Ejikulu
- Ejule
- Giwoligyo
- Gwolawo
- Iboko
- Itobe
- Mamerebo
- Ochadam
- Ofafu
- Ofokofi
- Ojiri
- Okokete
- Okpo
- Umomi

== Climate condition ==
Ofu LGA experiences a tropical savanna climate with a pronounced wet season (roughly April–October) that brings most of the annual precipitation, and a dry season (November–March) that is hotter and less humid. Recent local studies and weather records show seasonal variability in rainfall and temperature consistent with other parts of central Kogi.
