= Ibaji =

- LGA
- Interactive map of Ibaji
- Location in Nigeria
- Coordinates: 6°52′N 6°48′E
- Country: Nigeria
- State: Kogi State
- Headquarter: Onyedega

Government
  - Local Government Chairman: Emmanuel Uge

Area
  - Total: 1,377 km^{2} (532 sq mi)

Population (2006 census)
  - Total: 128,129
  - Density: 93.05/km^{2} (241.0/sq mi)
- Time zone: UTC+1 (WAT)
- 3-digit postal code prefix: 271
- ISO 3166 code: NG.KO.IB

Ibaji is a Local Government Area in Kogi State, Nigeria in the south of the state separated from Edo State to the west by the Niger River, and bordering Anambra State in the south. Its headquarters are in the town of Onyedega on the Niger River in the northwest of the area at6°53′00″N 6°41′00″E. Olu is the predominant dialect used in Ibaji local government area. They are all Igala.

The northeasterly line of equal latitude and longitude passes through the LGA.

It has an area of 1,377 km^{2} and a population of 128,129 at the 2006 census.

The postal code of the area is 271105. The Ibaji people are called Àbó Aji. Ibaji Local Government in Kogi State is one of the most neglected areas, with no government presence. At the grassroots, no roads, no water, no light, and no health center.

== Villages around Ibaji ==
Below you will find all the towns and villages in Ibaji Local Government, Kogi State;

1. Abocho
2. Achigili
3. Adiele
4. Adoji
5. Adoma
6. Adum
7. Agada
8. Agbajo
9. Agidibai
10. Agojeju
11. Ahojori
12. Aje-Kelega
13. Ajebido
14. Ajegwuna
15. Ajieru
16. Ajijeina
17. Ajochidi
18. Ajogwoni
19. Ajomachi
20. Ajonu-Ota
21. Akpameta
22. Akpobi
23. Angwa
24. Araba
25. Atenokpe
26. Ayanka
27. Efikelegwu
28. Egbile-Ugani
29. Egomeha
30. Elika
31. Emewe
32. Emewe-Efopa
33. Gbokoluba
34. Ibolo
35. Igbadim
36. Kefi
37. Lokp
38. Ogbogbo
39. Ojogba
40. Ojukpo
41. Okwolo
42. Opada
43. Uchaikpele
44. Unale

== Climate condition ==
Ibaji has a typically tropical climate with a long rainy season and a shorter dry season; monthly averages show high humidity and heavy rainfall from about April through October and hotter, drier conditions from November to March. Average monthly temperatures are generally high year-round, with the wet season seeing slightly lower daytime maxima and higher night minima.
