= Dekina =

Dekina Ajobi
- LGA and town
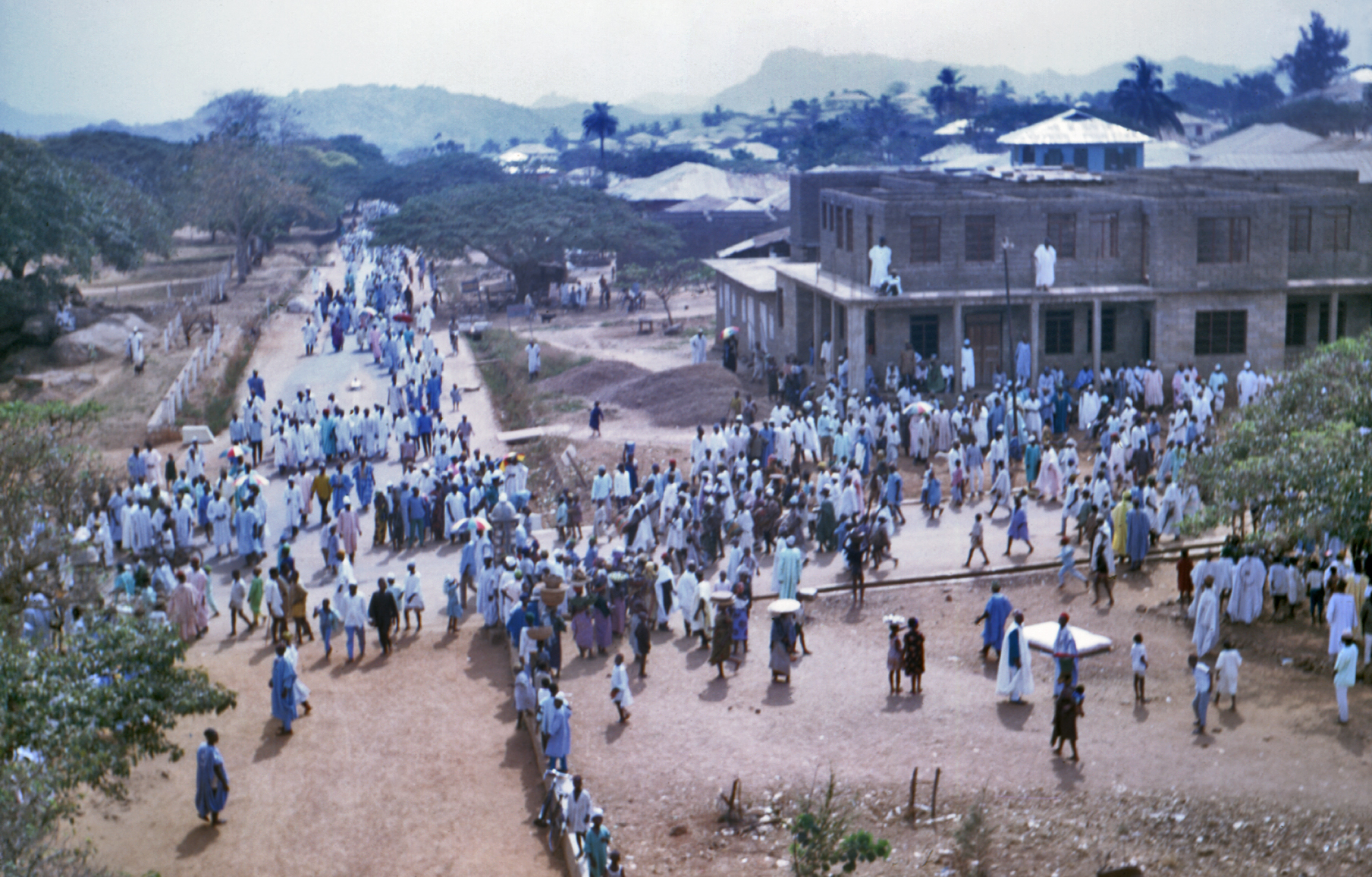
- Dekina in 1969
- Motto: Unity is strength
- Interactive map of Dekina
- Location in Nigeria
- Coordinates: 7°35′N 7°12′E
- Country: Nigeria
- State: Kogi State

Area
  - Total: 2,461 km^{2} (950 sq mi)

Population (2006 census)
  - Total: 260,312
  - Density: 105.8/km^{2} (274.0/sq mi)
- Time zone: UTC+1 (WAT)
- 3-digit postal code prefix: 272
- ISO 3166 code: NG.KO.DE

Dekina is a local government area in Kogi State, Nigeria on the A233 highway in the Middle Belt area at 7°41′41″N 7°01′20″E. The northeasterly line of equal latitude and longitude passes through the southeast of the LGA.

It has an area of 2,461 km^{2} (950 sq mi) and a population of 260,312 at the 2006 census.

The postal code of the area is 272.

== Climatic Condition ==
With a year-round temperature range of 18 °C (64 °F) to 34 °C (93 °F) and a wet season marked by overcast skies and a dry season marked by humid skies, the climate is hot and oppressive.

== Economy ==
Dekina Local Government Area is home to a variety of crops, including cocoyam, cassava, and yam. Numerous mineral mines and trade, with multiple markets in the area where a wide range of commodities are bought and sold, are two other significant economic activity in the area.
