= Igalamela-Odolu =

- LGA
- Interactive map of Igalamela-Odolu
- Location in Nigeria
- Coordinates: 7°05′N 7°05′E
- Country: Nigeria
- State: Kogi State
- Headquarter: Ajaka

Government
  - Local Government Chairman: Cosmas Attabor Ilemona

Area
  - Total: 2,175 km^{2} (840 sq mi)

Population (2006 census)
  - Total: 148,020
  - Density: 68.06/km^{2} (176.3/sq mi)
- Time zone: UTC+1 (WAT)
- 3-digit postal code prefix: 271
- ISO 3166 code: NG.KO.IO

Igalamela-Odolu is a Local Government Area in Kogi State, Nigeria. It is bordered by the Niger River in the west and Enugu State in the east. Its headquarters are located in the town of Ajaka, in the north of the area, at 7°10′16″N 6°49′35″E.

The northeasterly line of equal latitude and longitude passes through the LGA.

It has an area of 2,175 km^{2} and a population of 148,020 at the 2006 census.

The postal code of the area is 271.

The major ethnic group and language indigenous to the local government is the Igalas. The Igala language is primarily spoken in the local government area as a first language.

== Climate ==
In Igalamela-odolu, the rainy season is warm, uncomfortable and cloudy, while the dry season is hot, moist, slightly cloudy. Throughout the year, the temperature usually varies from 65 °F to 90 °F and is rarely below 58 °F or above 94 °F.
