= Bassa, Kogi State =

Bassa
- LGA
- Interactive map of Bassa
- Location in Nigeria
- Coordinates: 7°54′N 7°03′E
- Country: Nigeria
- State: Kogi State
- Headquarters: Oguma

Area
  - Total: 1,925 km^{2} (743 sq mi)

Population (2006 census)
  - Total: 139,993
  - Density: 72.72/km^{2} (188.4/sq mi)
- Time zone: UTC+1 (WAT)
- 3-digit postal code prefix: 272
- ISO 3166 code: NG.KO.BA

Bassa is a Local Government Area in Kogi State, Nigeria. Its northern border is the Benue River and its western border is the Niger River. Its headquarters are in the town of Oguma.

The chairman of the area is Hon. Theophilus Daruwana Adama.

It has an area of 1,925 km^{2} (743 sq mi) and a population of 139,687 at the 2006 census and as of 2022 projected to be 188,300.

The postal code of the area is 272.

Bassa Local Government Area is a culturally diverse region, comprising three major tribes: the Bassa people, also known as the Bassa-Komu, the Bassa-Nge, and the Egbira Koto.

Demographically, the Bassa-Komu has the largest population among the three tribes, followed by the Bassa-Nge and then the Egbira Koto.

Traditionally, each tribe has its own title holder, who plays a significant role in the cultural and social affairs of their respective communities. The traditional title holder of the Bassa-Komu is the Agụma of Bassa, who holds the esteemed position of a 1st Class Chief and serves as the Chairman of the Area Council of Traditional Rulers. Similarly, the Bassa-Nge tribe is led by the Etsu of Bassa-Nge, who is also a 1st Class Chief. The Etsu of Bassa Nge has his royal throne dominant in Gboloko, which serves as the kingdom headquarters of the Bassa Nge Kingdom. Furthermore, the Egbira Koto tribe is led by the Ohiogba of Mozum, who has recently been promoted to the position of a 1st Class Chief.

== History of Bassa Local Government Area ==
Bassa Local Government of Kogi State was created in 1976 from Benue State.

The area known as Bassa Local Government was created in 1976 which is a re-establishment of the Bassa Native Authority that was created by the colonial administration around 1900. Sixty years later this colony however lost its standing as it was merged with the Igala Native Authority in 1960 following a controversial exercise tagged, "reorganization of Native Authorities in the North." Its headquarter sits in Oguma, the adulterated name of the original Agwụma: a thatch made from a leaf called ishɛrɛ and used to roof houses. Bassa Local Government is boarded to the North by River Benue. In the West by River Niger. To the East by Omala Local Government and to the South by Dekina Local Government. The area comprise the three districts Bassa, Gboloko, and Mozum.

The inhabitants: Bassa komu and Bassa nge belong to different groups, ethnically. As they have between them clear distinctions in tradition, origin, culture, and language. While it is believed that the people called Bassa nge got the nomenclature from the word Babossa (which means fertile land or soil), a popular myth however suggests that as a way to seek for asylum in Bassa land, the people adopted the name. The Bassa people loosely known as the Bassa-komu had arrived here at about 1830's while the Bassa nge arrived at about 1850's. Going further, the suffix "komu" as attached is only popular to the Bassa people of Bassa Local Government Area of Kogi State. But the Bassa people in other states and Koton Karfe Local Government Area of Kogi State simply use and are referred to as 'Bassa' or 'Basa'.

The Agụma of Bassa, a first class Chief sitting in Oguma, the headquarter of the area is the traditional head of Bassa Local Government Area and the chairman, Bassa Area Traditional Council.

Bassa Local Government Area has ten political wards from the three districts; Bassa komu district: Akuba I, Akuba II, Akakana/Ayede, Ikende, and Ozongulo; Bassa nge district: Gboloko, Eforo, and Kpata; and Egbura district: Mozum and Ozugbe.

Some notable towns in Bassa Local Government Area includes Oguma (Agwụma), Sheria (the commercial town), Zharikama, Dagba, Kpanchɛ, Eyede, Gbashikere, Akakana, Paruwa, Ikende, Kpokudu, Zenyi, Wussa, Inigwi, Edenyi, Ogodo, Orokwo, and Udogbo from Bassa komu district; Gboloko (headquarter of Bassa nge), Eforo, Emi Guni, Eni Ampamo, Kpata, Shintakwo, Elule, Emi Adama, Ajigido, Emi Audu, and Adum Woiwoi from Bassa nge district; and Mozum (headquarter of Mozum), Biroko, Tekureje, Ugba, Daku Domozu, Ozugbe.

The area bordered to the north and west by rivers Benue and Niger is the agricultural hub of Kogi State due to its high agricultural produce annually. Yam, cassava, rice, guinea corn, millet, beneseed, groundnut, soya beans, et cetera, are produced in high quantities annually. The area is also covered by economic trees which includes Irvingia Gabonensis (Ogbono), Kola Nut, Cashew, Mahogany, Banana, Mango, Orange, Plantain, et cetera.

Apart from the afore mentioned economic factors, the area is also rich in aquaculture with the presence of numerous ponds and rivers for fishing escapades. It has been suggested that aquariums like Minya, Uda ma nɛ, Iteme in Gbashikere; and Rivine and Ujo all in Bassa komu district can help boost the revenue of the Local Government and in extension, the state if managed properly. Others includes Emako, Kpekpete, and Yontsu found in Bassa nge district.

The area also has in abundance some natural resources like petroleum, Clay, Iron ore, Salt, and Gypsum which can boost the development of the area if explored properly.

== Gbashikere kingdom ==
Gbashikere is a settlement in Akuba 1 ward of Bassa Local Government of Kogi State, Nigeria. The village was established in 1870 and the first settler is said to be Gado Mungazhɛ who migrated from Owuru following the Usman dan Fodio contest, Jihad.

Gado, a fisherman named the initial Hamlet as Gbashikere, a place of rest or relaxation. The name was said to have been copied by passersby who always saw Mungazhɛ relaxing (Gbashɛ-gbashɛ kere). Gbashikere was adulterated to Gbadikere or Gbedikere by the British. Some rivers as found by the first settler, Mungazhɛ are Kwurimi and Minya, the natural ponds where the people fish.

Gado Mungazhɛ ruled the community for 20 years (1871–1891). The next person was Daku Gado for 42 years (1892–1934), Daudu Gado for 17 years (1935–1952)), Gwatana Tassa Zhɛshɛ for 19 years (1953–1972), Dangara Kure for 30 years (1973–2012), and Stephen Uye Gwatana from 2012 till date.

The dominant clans found here are Akuba and Arɛnjɛ. However, the Akuba is the ruling clan.

The settlement borders with Esule to the east, Gbechi to the west, River Benue to the north and Kpoyibo to the south. It is about 10 km east to Oguma, the Local Government headquarters. The village is arguably the foremost hub for fishing escapades in Bassa Local Government Area, credit to River Minya.

The community has produced notable people which among them were chairmen of the Local Government Area, Honorables Luke Shigaba (late) and Bako Shigaba; Justice Michael Jimba, Honorable Sunday Jimba (late), Honorable Jimba Emmanuel Nibi, Uye Lucky, Paul Gudu, and Ambassador Denwi Joshua Adunga.

The parallel nature of the settlement sees it lying between mountains and lake Minya.

== Climate condition ==
Bassa is in the same tropical savanna climate band that covers much of Kogi State: a rainy season from roughly April/May to October and a dry season from November to March. Annual rainfall totals are substantial during the wet months, and temperatures remain warm throughout the year, with cooler nights during the peak of the dry season.
