= Olamaboro =

Olamaboro Ibe
- LGA
- Nickname: Miztus
- Interactive map of Olamaboro
- Location in Nigeria
- Coordinates: 7°11′N 7°34′E
- Country: Nigeria
- State: Kogi State
- Headquarter: Okpo

Government
  - Local Government Chairman: Williams Ameh O

Area
  - Total: 1,132 km^{2} (437 sq mi)

Population (2006 census)
  - Total: 160,152
  - Density: 141.5/km^{2} (366.4/sq mi)
- Time zone: UTC+1 (WAT)
- 3-digit postal code prefix: 270
- ISO 3166 code: NG.KO.OL

Olamaboro is a Local Government Area in the southeast of Kogi State, Nigeria, bordering Enugu State and Benue State. Its headquarters are in the town of Okpo.

It has an area of 1,132 km^{2} and a population of 160,152 at the 2006 census.

The postal code of the area is 270.

== Climate ==
In the town of Okpo, the rainy season is warm, oppressive, and overcast and the dry season is hot, muggy, and partly cloudy. Over the course of the year, the temperature typically varies from 61 °F to 88 °F and is rarely below 55 °F or above 93 °F.

== Notable people ==
- Ilebaye
- Edward Onoja
- Ogwu james Onoja

== Language ==
The people of Olamaboro speaks Igala which is one of the major languages in Kogi state.
