= Ankpa =

- LGA and town
- Interactive map of Ankpa
- Location in Nigeria
- Coordinates: 7°26′N 7°38′E
- Country: Nigeria
- State: Kogi State
- Headquarters: Ankpa Town

Government
  - Local Government Chairman: Adamu Yahaya Mohammed

Area
  - Total: 1,200 km^{2} (460 sq mi)

Population (2006 census)
  - Total: 267,353
  - Density: 220/km^{2} (580/sq mi)
- Time zone: UTC+1 (WAT)
- 3-digit postal code prefix: 270
- ISO 3166 code: NG.KO.AN

Ankpa is a town and Local Government Area in Kogi State, Nigeria.

It has an area of 1,200 km^{2} and a population of 267,353 at the 2006 census.

By 2016, the population had swelled to 359,300.

The postal code of the area is 270.

The northeasterly line of equal latitude and longitude passes through the Local Government Area.

== History of Ankpa Kingdom ==
Ankpa, a large community in Kogi state, Nigeria was founded by Atiyele, the grandson of Abutu Ejeh, the founder of the Igala Kingdom. Abutu Ejeh, who was of Jukun descent established hegemony over Idah about four centuries ago. After his death, his son, Idoko, ascended the throne as the Attah and paramount leader of the Igala Kingdom. Idoko had two (2) sons: Atiyele and Ayegba. Ankpa kingdom at that time comprised: the present Ankpa and Olamaboro local government areas which extend to Idoma land; as far as Igumale and up to Ete and Enugu-Ezike in Anambra state. While Idah was made up of the present Idah, Dekina, Ofu, and Bassa local government areas extending as far as Lokoja in the present Kogi Central and was part of Onitsha at some point.

== Ankpa Local Government Area ==
Ankpa Local Government Area has its administrative headquarters in Ankpa and the area is made of many towns, wards and villages such as Enjema, Ojoku, Odagba, Abache, Abo, Acherane, Adde, Aguma, Aka, Akwu, Ankpa, Atuma, Biraidu, Ebakpoti, Ede, Efiwo, & others. Ankpa Local Government Area is one of the local government areas in Kogi state having 3 major district areas, 13 wards represented by 13 councilors each and many villages under the districts.

Ankpa LGA was created with the main aim of attracting government's attention to people at the grassroots level. With this aim, they collect allocation from the federal government for socio-economic development.

== Climate ==
In Ankpa, the dry season is hot, muggy, and partly cloudy whereas the wet season is warm, oppressive, and overcast. The average annual temperature ranges from 16 °C (61 °F) to 32 °C (89 °F), with lows and highs of 12 °C (54 °F) and 34 °C (94 °F), respectively.

=== Temperature ===
From February 2 to April 16, the hot season, with an average daily high temperature above 31 °C (87 °F), lasts for 2.5 months. Averaging a high of 31 °C (87 °F) and a low of 22 °C (72 °F), April is the hottest month of the year in Ankpa.

From June 21 to October 24, the chilly season, with an average daily high temperature below 28 °C (82 °F), lasts 4.1 months. With an average low of 17 °C (62 °F) and high of 29 °C (84 °F), December is the coldest month of the year in Ankpa.

=== Cloud ===
The average proportion of sky covered by clouds in Ankpa varies significantly seasonally throughout the year.

In Ankpa, the clearer season starts about November 15 and lasts for 3.1 months, coming to a close around February 20.

In Ankpa, December is the clearest month of the year, with a 50% average percentage of clear, mostly clear, or partly overcast skies.

Beginning about February 20 and lasting for 8.9 months, the cloudier period of the year ends around November 15.

May is the cloudiest month of the year in Ankpa, with an average of 84% of the time having an overcast or mostly cloudy sky.

=== Precipitation ===
A day is considered to be wet if there has been at least 1 millimetre (0.039 in) of liquid or liquid-equivalent precipitation. Throughout the year, there are huge variations in the likelihood of rainy days in Ankpa.

From April 11 to October 29 (the length of the wetter season), there is a greater than 41% chance that any particular day will be rainy. In Ankpa, September has an average of 23.9 days with at least 1 millimetre (0.039 in) of precipitation, making it the month with the most rainy days.

From October 29 to April 11, or 5.4 months, is the dry season. December has an average of 0.6 days with at least 1 millimetre (0.039 in) of precipitation, making it the month with the fewest wet days in Ankpa.

In Ankpa, September has an average of 23.9 days of rain, which is the most of any month. This classification shows that rain alone is the most frequent type of precipitation throughout the year, with a high likelihood of 81% on September 12.
