= Delta =

Delta commonly refers to:

- Delta (letter) (Δ or δ), the fourth letter of the Greek alphabet
- D (NATO phonetic alphabet: "Delta"), the fourth letter in the Latin alphabet
- River delta, at a river mouth
- Delta Air Lines, a major US carrier

Delta may also refer to:

== Places ==
=== Canada ===
- Delta, British Columbia
  - Delta (federal electoral district)
  - Delta (provincial electoral district)
- Delta, Ontario

=== United States ===
- Mississippi Delta
- Arkansas Delta
- Delta, Alabama
- Delta Junction, Alaska
- Delta, Colorado
- Delta, Iowa
- Delta, Kentucky
- Delta, Louisiana
- Delta, Missouri
- Delta, Ohio
- Delta, Pennsylvania
- Sacramento–San Joaquin River Delta, California
- Delta, Utah
- Delta, Wisconsin, a town and an unincorporated community
- Delta County (disambiguation)

=== Elsewhere ===
- Delta Island, Antarctica
- Delta Stream, Antarctica
- Delta, Minas Gerais, Brazil
- Nile Delta, Egypt
- Delta, Thessaloniki, Greece
- Delta State, Nigeria
- Delta, Astrakhan Oblast, Russia
- Colonia Delta, Uruguay

== Arts and entertainment ==
=== Fictional elements ===
- Delta (デルタ), a dog beast-kin girl and the fourth member of Shadow Garden in the light novel and anime series The Eminence in Shadow
- Delta Megazord, a Megazord in Power Rangers in Space
- Deltas, a working class in Aldous Huxley's Brave New World

=== Film and television ===
- Delta (2008 film), Hungary
- Delta (American TV series), 1992
- Delta (Australian TV series), 1969
- Macross Delta or Macross Δ, in the Macross anime series
- Delta Channel, an Egyptian regional television channel
- TV Delta, a television station in Parnaíba, Piauí, Brazil

=== Music ===
==== Albums ====
- Delta (video album), 2003, Delta Goodrem
- Delta (Delta Goodrem album), 2007
- Delta (Visions of Atlantis album), 2011
- Delta (Mumford & Sons album), 2018
- Delta, by Shapeshifter, 2013

==== Other uses in music ====
- Alt-J (∆), a British indie band
- Delta blues, a music style
- "Delta", a song by Crosby, Stills & Nash from Daylight Again, 1982
- "Delta", a song by C2C

=== Other media ===
- Metal Gear Solid Delta, a video game
- Subject Delta, the main protagonist of Bioshock 2
- Delta (poetry magazine)
- Delta (science magazine)
- Delta (video game), 1987
- Delta FM or Delta Radio, a former UK radio station
- Deltarune, a video game

== Businesses and organizations ==
=== Companies ===
- Delta Air Lines, US
  - Delta Connection, a Delta Air Lines brand
- Delta Bank, Ukraine
- Delta Cafés, a Portuguese coffee company
- Delta Electric Company
- Delta Electricity, Australia
- Delta Electronics, Taiwan
- Delta Faucet Company
- Delta Holding, a Serbian corporation
- Delta Hotels, Canada
- Delta Machinery, a tool company
- Delta Motor Corporation, South Africa
- Delta Computer, a defunct computer company
- Delta Motors Corporation, a former automobile company in the Philippines
- Delta (company), a Dutch cable operator

=== Schools ===
- Delta State (disambiguation), several universities
- Delta College (disambiguation)
- Delta Academy (disambiguation)
- Delta Secondary School (disambiguation)
- Delta High School (disambiguation)
- Delta School District (disambiguation)
- Delta Career Education Corporation, US
- Delta International University of New Orleans, Louisiana, US
- Delta Schools, Riyadh, Saudi Arabia

=== Law enforcement and military ===
- Delta (Norwegian police unit)
- Delta Force, U.S. Army special operations
- Space Force Delta, US Space Force logo
- Space Delta, a command echelon in the structure of the US Space Force

=== Other organizations ===
- Delta Sigma Theta, a historically Black college sorority often referred to simply as "Delta"
- STC Delta, a Georgian R&D center
- American Delta Party, an American political party
- San Francisco Deltas, a soccer team

== Finance ==
- Delta (finance), rate of change of a value
- Visa Delta or Visa Debit, a debit card

== People ==
- Δ, signature of David Macbeth Moir (1798–1851), Scottish physician and writer
- Delta Blind Billy (fl. c. 1930s), American Delta blues artist and outlaw
- Delta Burke (born 1956), American actress
- Delta Dorsch (1915–2011), U.S. Virgin Islands public servant
- Delta Goodrem (born 1984), Australian singer
- Delta Work (Gabriel A. Villarreal; born 1976), American drag performer
- Delta (wrestler) (born 1985), Mexican professional wrestler
- Penelope Delta (1874–1941), Greek author

== Science and technology ==
=== Chemistry ===
- Δ (delta), right-handed isomer in a coordination complex
- Delta convention, for designating allenes
- Δ, notation for double bond positions in fatty acids

=== Computing ===
- Delta (computer), a Russian ZX Spectrum clone
- Delta encoding or delta compression, in computer communications
- Delta timing, in relation to hardware and network responsiveness
- Delta (emulator), a video game console emulator
- DELTA, an OpenVMS debugger
- Delta (situational awareness system), a system developed by the Ukrainian military services
- Microsoft Delta, a discontinued commercial source control program

=== Earth sciences ===
- Epicentral distance (Δ)
- Subtropical Storm Delta (1972), Atlantic
- Tropical Storm Delta (2005), Atlantic
- Hurricane Delta, (2020) Atlantic

=== Mathematics ===
- ∆, (Unicode character U+2206 ∆ INCREMENT)
- Δ, a difference of state between two before and after state schemas in the Z notation
- $\delta$, the first Feigenbaum constant
- Delta connective, a unary connective in t-norm fuzzy logics
- Delta method for approximating the distribution of a function
- Difference operator (Δ)
- Dirac delta function (δ function)
- Increment operator (∆)
- Kronecker delta ($\delta_{ij}$)
- Laplace operator (Δ)
- Modular discriminant (Δ)
- Symmetric difference (Δ), the set of elements which are in either of two sets and not in their intersection
- Δ^{m}_{n}, a class of sets in the analytical hierarchy, for every natural number m, n

=== Medicine and biology ===
- Delta (ligand), an activator of the notch signaling pathway
- DELTA (taxonomy), a data format for descriptions of living things
- Delta (wasp), Old World genus of potter wasps
- Delta (moth) (Campydelta), a genus
- Delta variant, of SARS-CoV-2 that causes COVID-19
- Delta wave, a brain wave

=== Vehicles ===
- Delta (rocket family)
- Delta, a tricycle layout
- Daihatsu Delta, trucks
- Delta formation, V-shaped aircraft formation
- Delta wing, a triangular aircraft wing
- Delta-class submarine (NATO reporting name), Soviet/Russian SSBN
- General Motors Delta platform, a car platform
- GSM Delta, a South African sports car sold in the UK
- Lancia Delta, an Italian rally car
- Oldsmobile Delta 88, a GM 1965–1983
- TrikeBuggy Delta, an American ultralight trike

=== Other science and technology ===
- Refractory delta, in the roof of an electric arc furnace
- Delta baryon, a subatomic particle
- Delta circuit, in three-phase electric power
- Delta kite, a type of kite
- Delta robot, a delta-shaped parallel robot
- Ilford Delta, a type of photographic film
- Depleted Lean-channel Transistor, the first type of fin field-effect transistor

== Sport ==
- Delta (horse) (1946–1960), Australia
- Mississippi Valley State Delta Devils and Devilettes, Itta Bena, Mississippi, US
- San Francisco Deltas, a soccer team
- Delta (orienteering club), a Finnish former club

== Other uses ==
- Delta Dental, an American system
- Delta Works, a flood-protection works in the Netherlands
- Delta, a font designed by Aldo Novarese
- Diploma in Teaching English to Speakers of Other Languages
- Delta, a quadra group used in socionics

== See also ==
- and δ
- and δ
- ᐃ, a letter of Canadian Aboriginal Syllabics
- The Delta (disambiguation)
- Delta model, a strategic management model
- Nabla symbol ($\nabla$), an inverted delta representing del, a vector differential operator
- Kronecker delta ($\delta_{ij}$), a function
- Dirac delta ($\delta(x)$), a function
- $\Delta ABC$, a triangle defined by points A, B and C
- (ε, δ)-definition of limit
- $\Delta \%$ (%CH), a percentage change operation found on some calculators
- $\Delta^0_n$, a classification in the arithmetical hierarchy
- $\Delta^1_n$, a classification in the analytical hierarchy
- $\Delta^P_i$, a classification in the polynomial hierarchy
- δ^{13}C, a measure of the ratio of stable isotopes 13C:12C
- δ^{15}N, a measure of the ratio of stable isotopes 15N:14N
- δ^{18}O, a measure of the ratio of stable isotopes oxygen-18:oxygen-16
- DeltaWing, a prototype racing car
- High-leg delta, a three phase electrical circuit
- Delta Delta Delta, a sorority
- Delta function (disambiguation)
- Task Force Delta (disambiguation)
- Delta Force (disambiguation)
- Delta class (disambiguation)
- Delta 1 (disambiguation)
- Delta 4 (disambiguation)
- Latin delta (ẟ), letter of the extended Latin alphabet
- Nabla symbol, typeset as ∇
