= D class =

D class may refer to:

== Ships ==
- D-class cruiser (Germany), a pair of proposed cruisers
- D-class cruiser (United Kingdom), British light cruisers that served during World War II
- D-class lifeboat, British lifeboats
- D-class destroyer (disambiguation), several classes of ships
- British D-class submarine
- United States D-class submarine
- D-class ferry, roll-on/roll-off ferries operated by DFDS Seaways

== Rail vehicles ==
=== Australia ===
- Commonwealth Railways D class, 4-4-0 steam locomotives
- MRWA D class, 2-8-0 type steam locomotives
- South Australian Railways D class, 4-4-0 steam locomotives
- Victorian Railways D class (1876), 4-4-0 steam locomotive
- Victorian Railways D class (1887), 4-4-0 steam locomotive
- Victorian Railways Dd class, 4-6-0 steam locomotive
- WAGR D class, 4-6-4T tank locomotive
- WAGR D class (1884), 0-4-0ST tank locomotives
- WAGR D class (diesel), diesel locomotives
- D-class Melbourne tram
- D-class Melbourne tram (1914)
- D-class Sydney tram

=== India ===
- DHR D Class, 0-4-0+0-4-0 Garratt-type articulated steam locomotives

=== New Zealand ===
- NZR D class (1874), 33 2-4-0T tank locomotives
- NZR D class (1929), 1 experimental 0-4-0T locomotives

=== Philippines ===
- Manila Railway D class, 4-6-0 steam locomotives

=== United Kingdom ===
- Metropolitan Railway D Class, tank engines
- NBR D class 0-6-0, steam locomotives
- NBR D class 0-6-0T, tank locomotives
- LNWR Class D, 0-8-0 steam locomotives
- SECR D class, 4-4-0 tender locomotives

== Other uses ==
- D-class blimp, United States Navy blimps
- D-segment, a European vehicle size class
- D-class personnel, disposable human test subjects in the fictional SCP Foundation

== See also ==
- Class D (disambiguation)
- D type (disambiguation)
- Delta class (disambiguation)
