= Bo Eason =

American football player (born 1961)

No. 21
- Position: Safety

Personal information
- Born: March 10, 1961 (age 65); Walnut Grove, California, U.S.
- Listed height: 6 ft 2 in (1.88 m)
- Listed weight: 200 lb (91 kg)

Career information
- High school: Delta (Clarksburg, California)
- College: UC Davis
- NFL draft: 1984: 2nd round, 54th overall pick

Career history
- Houston Oilers (1984–1987); San Francisco 49ers (1988)*
- * Offseason or practice squad member only

Awards and highlights
- Third-team All-American (1983)

Career NFL statistics
- Interceptions: 6
- Fumble recoveries: 2
- Sacks: 3.5
- Stats at Pro Football Reference

Bo Eason (born March 10, 1961) is an American actor, playwright, author, motivational speaker, and former football player. He played safety for four seasons for the Houston Oilers of the National Football League (NFL). He played college football for the UC Davis Aggies and was selected by the Oilers in the second round of the 1984 NFL draft.

== Early life ==
Eason was born and raised in Walnut Grove, California. His brother, Tony Eason, also played in the NFL. After graduating from Delta High School in Clarksburg, California, he played football for the UC Davis Aggies at the University of California, Davis. He was recognized as a third-team All-American as a senior.

== Career ==
Eason was selected by the Houston Oilers in the second round of the 1984 NFL Draft. In 1986, Eason's season ended with a broken ankle in contest against the Miami Dolphins. He signed with the San Francisco 49ers in the 1988 offseason, but suffered a knee injury in training camp, ending his season and career.

In 2009, Eason partnered with Willoughby Productions to develop and create The Bo Eason Show, a daily talk show for daytime television. A presentation tape and a "mini-pilot" were produced and shopped to various networks and syndicators.

== Filmography ==
=== Film ===
| Year | Title | Role | Notes |
|---|---|---|---|
| 1995 | Miami Rhapsody | Jeff | |
| 1995 | The Spy Within | Donner | |
| 1996 | Not Again! | Jamie | |
| 1997 | Volcano | Bud McVie | |
| 2000 | After Sex | Salesman | |
| 2008 | Pride and Glory | Investigator Lieberthal | |
| 2014 | 37: A Final Promise | Police Detective | |

=== Television ===
| Year | Title | Role | Notes |
|---|---|---|---|
| 1993 | Baywatch | Brady Nichols | 2 episodes |
| 1995 | ER | Charlie | Episode: "Everything Old Is New Again" |
| 1996 | Strange Luck | Andrew Ulmer | Episode: "Wrong Number" |
| 1996 | Tornado! | Tex Fulton | Television film |
| 1998 | A Bright Shining Lie | Officer Tally | Television film |
| 2001 | Falcon Down | Security Guard | Television film |
