= Delta School District =

Delta School District or Delta School Board may refer to:

- School District 37 Delta, in British Columbia, Canada
- Delta/Greely School District, in Delta Junction, Alaska, USA
- KIPP: Delta Public Schools, a school district in Helena–West Helena, Arkansas, USA
- River Delta Unified School District, Sacramento County, California, USA
- South Delta School District, Tsawwassen, British Columbia, Canada
- Delta View Joint Union School District, Kings County, California, USA
- Pike-Delta-York Local School District, Fulton County, Ohio, USA
- Delta Special School District, Desha County, Arkansas, USA

== See also ==
- Delta (disambiguation)
