= Delta University =

Delta University may refer to:

- Delta University for Science and Technology, Mansoura, Egypt
- Delta International University of New Orleans, Louisiana
- Delta State Polytechnic, Delta, Nigeria, a set of three public institutions
- Delta State University, Abraka, Delta, Nigeria, state government university
- Delta State University, Cleveland, Mississippi
- East Delta University, Agrabad, Chittagong, Bangladesh
- Western Delta University, Oghara, Delta State, Nigeria

== See also ==
- Delta College (disambiguation)
- Delta State (disambiguation)
- Delta (disambiguation)
