= Western Australian Government Railway D class =

Western Australian Government Railway D class may refer to one of the following locomotives:

- WAGR D class (1884)
- WAGR D class
- WAGR D class (diesel)
