= WAGR ADX class =

Former diesel railcars operated in Perth, Western Australia

- Manufacturer: Midland Railway Workshops
- Entered service: 1959
- Number built: 10
- Fleet numbers: ADX661–ADX670
- Operator: Western Australian Government Railways

Specifications
- Prime movers: AEC 11.3 L (2.5 imp gal; 3.0 US gal)
- Track gauge: 1,067 mm (3 ft 6 in)

The WAGR ADX class was a 10 member class of diesel railcars operated by the Western Australian Government Railways between 1959 and 1988.

== History ==
Based on the Cravens built ADG/ADH class railcars, in 1959 the Midland Railway Workshops delivered the first of 10 ADX railcars. In 1966, ADX670 was fitted with power doors. Although deemed a success, no more conversions followed. Withdrawals commenced in 1982 with the last withdrawn in September 1988. Some donated their engines to ADGs.
