= Delta Force (disambiguation) =

Delta Force is a United States military special operations unit.

The term may also refer to:

== Games ==
- Delta Force (series), a series of first-person shooter video games
  - Delta Force (video game), the first game in the series released in 1998
  - Delta Force (2025 video game), a free-to-play game
- Delta Force: America Strikes Back!, a 1986 tabletop role-playing game

== Films ==
- The Delta Force, a 1986 American action film
- Delta Force Commando, a 1988 Italian action film
- Operation Delta Force, a telefilm direct-to-video series
- Delta Farce, a 2007 comedy film

== Other uses ==
- Project DELTA, a Vietnam War era United States special forces unit
- Delta Force F.C., a Nigerian football club

== See also ==
- Task Force Delta (disambiguation)
- Delta Force 1 (disambiguation)
- Delta (disambiguation)
