= Model D =

Model D may refer to:

- AJS Model D, a motorcycle
- Cadillac Model D, a car
- Curtiss Model D, an early pusher aircraft
- Gee Bee Model D, a sports aircraft
- Leading Edge Model D, a personal computer
- MAB Model D pistol
- Minimoog Model D, a synthesizer
- Wright Model D, an observation aircraft

== See also ==
- Class D (disambiguation)
- Type D (disambiguation)
