= Delta Force 1 =

Delta Force 1 or variant may refer to:

- The Delta Force a.k.a. Delta Force 1, a 1986 action movie, first in the series
- Operation Delta Force a.k.a. Operation Delta Force 1, a 1987 telefilm, first in the series
- Delta Force (video game) a.k.a. Delta Force I, a 1998 video game, first in the series

== See also ==
- Delta (disambiguation)
- Task Force Delta (disambiguation)
