= D-class tram =

D-class tram may refer to:

- D-class Melbourne tram, built 2002–2004
- D-class Melbourne tram (1914)
- D-class Sydney tram, built 1896–1899

== See also ==
- D type Adelaide tram
