= Delta High School =

Delta High School may refer to:

- Delta High School (Alaska)
- KIPP: Delta Collegiate High School, a school in Helena-West Helena, Arkansas
- Delta High School (Clarksburg, California)
- Delta Charter High School, a school in Tracy, California
- Delta High School (Muncie, Indiana)
- Delta High School (Ohio)
- Delta High School (Utah)
- Delta High School (Washington)

== See also ==
- Delta (disambiguation)
- Delta Secondary School (disambiguation)
- South Delta High School, a school in Rolling Fork, Mississippi
