= Delta 4 (disambiguation) =

Delta 4 was a British software developer.

Delta IV was a group of U.S. space rockets.

Delta 4 or Delta IV may also refer to:

- Mission Delta 4, U.S. Space Force
- Delta-class submarine including the Delta-IV subclass
- Delta IV oil field in the Black Sea
- Lippisch Delta IV, German experimental aircraft designed by Alexander Lippisch

== See also ==
- Delta (disambiguation)
- Four (disambiguation)
- IV (disambiguation)
