= Gavin Cracck =

Nigerian musical artist (born 1993)

- Born: Edamwen Gavin Ikponmwosa; 3 June 1993 (age 33); Sapele, Delta State, Nigeria
- Origin: Edo, Nigeria
- Genres: Hip hop
- Occupations: Rapper; singer; entrepreneur; songwriter; producer
- Instrument: vocals
- Label: June-Third Entertainment

Edamwen Gavin Ikponmwosa (born 3 June 1993), known professionally as Gavin Cracck, is a Nigerian rapper, singer-songwriter and producer. He is known for collaborating with Nigerian rapper Vector on his debut project titled Push the Limits which was released on May 30, 2020.

== Early life ==
Gavin was born on the 3rd of June 1993 in Sapele, Delta State in Nigeria. Gavin's musical journey commenced during his teenage years, where he found his passion for recording music alongside his childhood companions during their time in secondary school.

== Education ==
Gavin became an undergraduate of the Delta State Polytechnic in 2015.

== Career ==
In 2020, the Nigerian rapper and songwriter launched his professional career as a rapper on Spotify as Gavin Cracck. On May 30, 2020, he released “Push The Limits” where he collaborated with Nigerian rapper Vector. On April 9, 2021, he released “Motiri” where he collaborated with Nigeria musical artist Brickz. On July 28, 2022, he released “PVC” which is an acronym of Passport Visa cash.

== Discography ==
=== Singles ===
- Motiri - 2021
- Push The Limits Ft Vector - 2020
- PVC - 2022

=== Extended Plays ===
- A Sniff Of Cracck - 2022
