= Delta State (disambiguation) =

Delta State is a state in southern Nigeria.

Delta State may also refer to:

- Delta State (TV series), a Canadian animated television series
- Delta State University, a university in Cleveland, Mississippi, US
- Delta State University, Abraka, a university in Delta, Nigeria
- Delta State University of Science and Technology, Ozoro, a university in Delta, Nigeria
- Delta State Polytechnic, a set of three public institutions in Delta, Nigeria

== See also ==
- River delta
- Delta College (disambiguation)
- Delta University (disambiguation)
