= Aniocha South =

- LGA
- Interactive map of Aniocha South
- Location within Nigeria
- Coordinates: 6°08′N 6°29′E
- Country: Nigeria
- State: Delta State
- Headquarters: Ogwashi Ukwu

Area
  - Total: 868 km^{2} (335 sq mi)

Population (2006)
  - Total: 140,604
  - Density: 162/km^{2} (420/sq mi)
- Time zone: UTC+1 (WAT)
- National language: Enuani Igbo

Aniocha South is a Local Government Area (LGA) of Delta State, Nigeria. Its headquarters is in the town of Ogwashi-Uku.

Communities in the LGA are Abah Unor, Adonte, Ashama, Egbudu-Akah, Ejeme-Aniogor, Ejeme-Unor, Ewulu, Isheagu (comprising Onuiyi, Atuakpai and Obikwere), Ogwashi Uku (comprising Oloh, Isah, Azagba, Igbudu), Nsukwa, Ubulu-Okiti, Ubulu-Ukwu, Ubulu-Unor, Ukwu-Oba and Umute. This LGA has a total population of 142,045 people as at the 2006 census.

== Economy ==
Major occupations are farming, and fishing (especially in Ewulu, Isheagu and Ejeme Aniogor).

The predominant agricultural activities in the area include oil palm plantations in Nsukwa, Ubulu Uku, and Ashama. A rubber plantation operates in Egbudu-Akah, and animal husbandry is practiced in Ubulu-Unor.

== Transport ==
These communities are linked by good road networks, most of which are tarred. Metalled roads are yet to reach Adonte, Ewulu and Ukwu-Oba. River ports in Ewulu and Isheagu link the LGA to other others and States on the Niger River.

== Notable people ==
Notable people who hail from Aniocha South as a Local Government Area include:

- Peter Konyegwachie
- Jay-Jay Okocha
- Ngozi Okonjo-Iweala
- Raph Uwechue

Obi Agbogidi Alfred Oloome Okolie is the oldest reigning monarch in the world, from Aniocha-South. The first in his line, the Obi of Egbudu-Akah, was crowned on 12 February 1946.

== Amenities ==
Attractions include various festivals, Ngozeg hotels, and Adeke Restaurants.

== Education ==
The LGA has primary and secondary schools, as well as Delta State Polytechnic, Ogwashi-Uku.

== Cities, towns and communities ==
- Aba Unor
- Abo-Ogwashi
- Abugba
- Adonte
- Ani Ugbo
- Aniefume
- Anifekide
- Ashaba Ubulu-uno
- Ashama
- Azagba-Ogwashi
- Azamu
- Edo-Ogwashi
- Egbudu-Akah
- Ejeme
- Ejeme-Aniogor
- Ewulu
- Egbudu
- Isah-Ogwashi
- Isheagu (including Onuiyi, Atuekpai, Nzali, Utu-Oyebala, Onu-Iyese, Utu-Eko and Okpulu-Eke)
- Nkpulu Camp
- Nsukwa
- Obi Adigwe
- Obi Anigala
- Obi Ashimili
- Obi Chukuji
- Obi Dugbo
- Obi Emenen
- Obi Nti
- Obi Okonkwo
- Obi Owodi
- Ogidi
- Ogwashi Ukwu, LGA headquarters
- Olodu-Ogwashi
- Olor
- Otulu-Ogwashi
- Ubulu-Okiti
- Ubulu Ukwu
- Ubulu-Uno
- Ukwu Oba
- Umudike
- Umute
