= Type D =

Type D or D-Type may refer to:

== Science ==
- D-type asteroid
- Type D personality, a concept used in the field of medical psychology
- Petrov type D, an algebraic classification

== Technology ==
- Type D plug, a type of electrical power plug
- Type-D destroyer, ships of the Imperial Japanese Navy
- Type D escort ship, ships of the Imperial Japanese Navy
- Type D submarine, submarines of the Imperial Japanese Navy
- Avro Type D, a 1911 aircraft
- Caudron Type D, a 1911 aircraft
- Blackburn Type D, a 1912 aircraft
- Handley Page Type D, a 1910 aircraft
- D type Adelaide tram

=== Motor vehicles ===
- Jaguar D-Type, a sports racing car
- Honda D-Type, a motorcycle
- Audi Type D, a car
- Auto Union Type D, a Grand Prix racing car

== See also ==
- Class D (disambiguation)
- Model D (disambiguation)
