= Delta class =

Delta class may refer to:

- Delta-class submarine (Russian: Дельта) Soviet designations Project 667B "Murena", Project 667BD "Murena-M", Project 667BDR "Kalmar", Project 667BDRM "Delfin"; NATO reporting names Delta I, Delta II, Delta III, Delta IV respectively), a series of third generation nuclear-powered ballistic missile submarines of the Soviet Navy.
- Delta-class repair ship, a variant of the U.S. Navy MARCOM Type C3-class ship
- MEKO Delta-class frigate, an alternative name for the MEKO D frigate design which would evolve into the MEKO 200 family
- Virgin Galactic Delta-class spacecraft, the follow up suborbital spaceship to SpaceShip III-class spacecraft
- Delta-class Payload Assist Module (PAM-D), a U.S. satellite launch upper-stage rocket
- Delta-class locomotive; see Egyptian Delta Light Railways
- Nordex Delta-class windmill electric power turbine
- Delta-class strike fighter, a fictional spaceship from Metroid; see Characters in the Metroid series

== See also ==
- SPAP class Δ (Vulcan) (SPAP class delta) locomotive
- Delta (disambiguation)
- Class (disambiguation)
- Class 4 (disambiguation)
- Fourth class
- Class D (disambiguation)
- D class (disambiguation)
