= Nsukwa =

Community in Delta State, Nigeria

Nsukwa is an Anioma community settled in the Aniocha South area of Delta State, Nigeria.
