= Delta function (disambiguation) =

A Dirac delta function or simply delta function is a generalized function on the real number line denoted by δ that is zero everywhere except at zero, with an integral of one over the entire real line.

Delta function may also refer to:

- Kronecker delta, a function of two variables which is one for equal arguments and zero otherwise, and which forms the identity element of an incidence algebra
- Modular discriminant (Δ), a complex function in Weierstrass's elliptic functions

== See also ==
- Delta function potential, in quantum mechanics, a potential well described by the Dirac delta function
- Delta-functor
- Delta operator
- Hooley's Delta function, maximum number of divisors of n in [u, eu] for all u, where e is Euler's number.
