= Delta College =

Delta College may refer to:

- Delta College (Michigan), near Bay City
- Delta Technical College, Horn Lake, Mississippi
- Louisiana Delta Community College, Monroe, Louisiana
- Mississippi Delta Community College, Moorhead, Mississippi
- San Joaquin Delta College, Stockton, California

== See also ==
- KIPP: Delta Collegiate High School, in Helena-West Helena, Arkansas
- Delta State (disambiguation)
- Delta (disambiguation)
- Delta University (disambiguation)
