= Delta County =

Delta County is the name of several counties in the United States:

- Delta County, Colorado
- Delta County, Michigan
- Delta County, Texas

== See also ==
- Delta (disambiguation)
