= WAGR ADG class =

Diesel railcar class in Perth, Western Australia

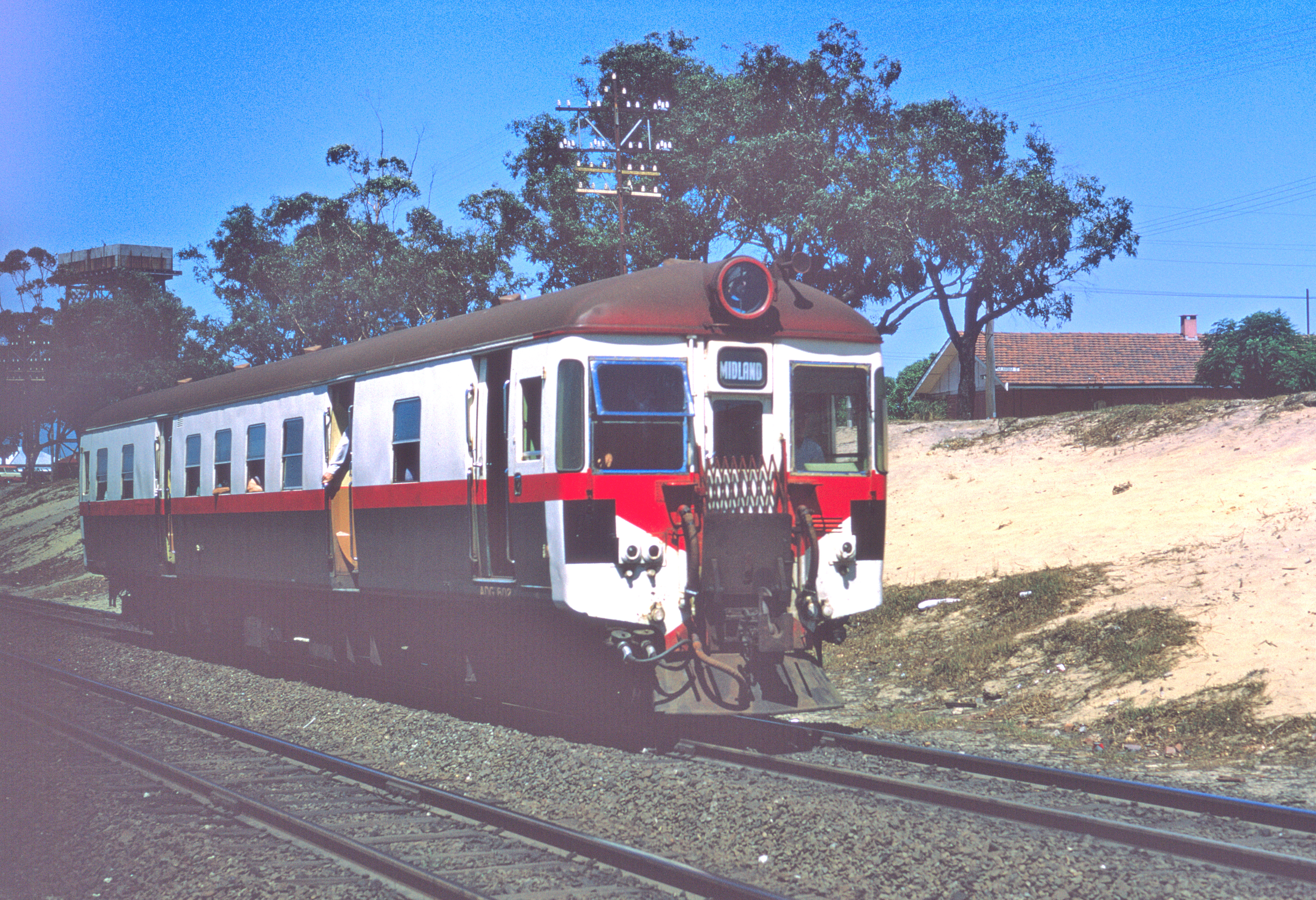
- ADG 602 on a Midland-bound service, 1966
- Stock type: Diesel multiple unit
- In service: 1954–1992
- Manufacturer: Cravens
- Built at: Sheffield
- Constructed: 1951–1954
- Entered service: 1954
- Refurbished: 1963–64: Superchargers 1969: Voith hydraulic transmissions 1986: 11.3 litre AEC engines ex-ADX railcars
- Number built: 18
- Number in service: 0
- Number preserved: 5
- Formation: May have AYE trailer from 1955, or ADA trailer from 1962
- Fleet numbers: ADG601–ADG618
- Capacity: 62 seated, 48 standing
- Operator: Western Australian Government Railways

Specifications
- Car body construction: Welded steel
- Train length: 2x ADG: 125 ft (38 metres)
- Car length: 62 feet 6 inches (19.05 m)
- Width: 8 feet 11 inches (2.72 m)
- Height: 11 feet 7 7/8 inches (3.553 m)
- Floor height: 3 feet 7 1/8 inches (1.095 m)
- Doors: 2 per side
- Articulated sections: 1 or 2 ADG railcars, optionally an AYE or ADA trailer.
- Wheel diameter: 2 feet 7 1/2 inches (800 mm)
- Prime movers: AEC 9.6 litre AEC 11.3 litre from mid-1980s Mercedes-Benz from mid-1980s
- Track gauge: 1,067 mm (3 ft 6 in)

The WAGR ADG class was an 18 member class of diesel railcars operated by the Western Australian Government Railways between 1954 and 1992.

== History ==
Having trialled Governor railcars on the Perth suburban network, in September 1951 an order was placed with Cravens, Sheffield for 18 diesel railcars with all delivered in 1954. An additional four were delivered for country operation as the ADH class. Midland Railway Workshops built nine AYE trailer cars on the second hand underframes that were operated between two ADGs to operate as three car sets. These were replaced by ADAs in 1962.

In 1963/64, the ADGs were fitted with superchargers and between 1969 and 1973 with Voith transmissions. In the mid-1980s, some were fitted with larger AEC 11.3 litre engines from withdrawn ADX railcars while others received new Mercedes-Benz engines. Most lasted until 1992 when replaced by electric trains.

Two have been preserved by the Hotham Valley Railway and three by Rail Heritage WA.
