= Delta 1 =

Delta 1 may refer to:

- Delta One, financial derivatives products that have no optionality and as such have a delta very close to one
- Delta One (business class), premier business class product for Delta Air Lines.
- Fairey Delta 1, a research airplane made by Fairey Aviation
- Delta (rocket family), pre-Delta-II (Delta I) rockets
- Delta-class submarine, including the Delta-I subclass
- Delta 1 (glider), a German glider
- Delta I (computer system), a 1960s computer system installed at the United States military's Space Defense Center
- Delta I, a merchant ship originally named USCGC Dione

== See also ==
- Delta (disambiguation)
- One (disambiguation)
- I (disambiguation)
