= Bogle Vineyards =

Winery in California, USA

Bogle Vineyards is a California winery that traces its history in the Sacramento River Delta back to the late 1800s. The company was founded in 1979 and is based in Clarksburg, California. Warren Bogle is the President and Vineyard Director. The brand produces varietal wines including chardonnay, zinfandel, cabernet sauvignon, petit syrah, sauvignon blanc, merlot, and pinot noir. It also produces dessert wines in the style of Port with petit sirah.
