= Clarksburg, California =

Clarksburg
- census-designated place
- Location in California
- Coordinates: 38°25′14″N 121°31′38″W
- Country: United States
- State: California
- County: Yolo

Area
  - Total: 2.03 sq mi (5.26 km^{2})
  - Land: 2.03 sq mi (5.26 km^{2})
  - Water: 0 sq mi (0.00 km^{2}) 0%
- Elevation: 9.8 ft (3 m)

Population (2020)
  - Total: 402
  - Density: 198.1/sq mi (76.48/km^{2})
- ZIP code: 95612
- Area code: 916, 279
- FIPS code: 06-13784
- GNIS feature IDs: 221173, 2582974

Clarksburg (formerly, Clarksburgh) is a census-designated place in Yolo County, California, United States. It is located on the Sacramento River, in the extreme southeastern corner of the county. It lies at an elevation of 10 feet (3 m) in ZIP code 95612 and is served by area codes 916 and 279. As of the 2020 census, Clarksburg had a population of 402.

== Geography ==
According to the United States Census Bureau, the CDP covers an area of 2.0 square miles (5.3 km^{2}), all land.

=== Climate ===
According to the Köppen Climate Classification system, Clarksburg has a warm-summer Mediterranean climate, abbreviated "Csa" on climate maps.

Climate data for Clarksburg, California (1935–1974)
Month	Jan	Feb	Mar	Apr	May	Jun	Jul	Aug	Sep	Oct	Nov	Dec	Year
Mean daily maximum °F (°C)	52.5 (11.4)	58.9 (14.9)	64.5 (18.1)	71.3 (21.8)	78.3 (25.7)	85.4 (29.7)	90.6 (32.6)	89.9 (32.2)	86.9 (30.5)	76.9 (24.9)	63.9 (17.7)	53.8 (12.1)	72.7 (22.6)
Mean daily minimum °F (°C)	35.6 (2.0)	38.9 (3.8)	41.5 (5.3)	45.0 (7.2)	49.2 (9.6)	53.5 (11.9)	56.0 (13.3)	55.0 (12.8)	52.9 (11.6)	46.8 (8.2)	39.4 (4.1)	36.3 (2.4)	45.8 (7.7)
Average precipitation inches (mm)	3.84 (98)	3.00 (76)	2.15 (55)	1.39 (35)	0.37 (9.4)	0.12 (3.0)	0.01 (0.25)	0.02 (0.51)	0.20 (5.1)	1.03 (26)	2.09 (53)	3.15 (80)	17.37 (441)
Average precipitation days (≥ 0.01 in)	9	8	8	5	2	1	0	0	1	3	6	9	52
Source: WRCC

== Demographics ==
Historical population
Census	Pop.	Note	%±
2010	418		—
2020	402		−3.8%
U.S. Decennial Census; 1850–1870 1880-1890; 1900 1910 1920; 1930 1940 1950; 1960 1970 1980; 1990 2000 2010

Clarksburg first appeared as a census designated place in the 2010 U.S. census.

=== 2020 census ===
As of the 2020 census, Clarksburg had a population of 402. The population density was 198.1 inhabitants per square mile (76.5/km^{2}). The age distribution was 82 people (20.4%) under the age of 18, 37 people (9.2%) aged 18 to 24, 85 people (21.1%) aged 25 to 44, 114 people (28.4%) aged 45 to 64, and 84 people (20.9%) who were 65 years of age or older. The median age was 44.7 years. For every 100 females there were 105.1 males, and for every 100 females age 18 and over there were 92.8 males age 18 and over.

0.0% of residents lived in urban areas, while 100.0% lived in rural areas.

There were 164 households, out of which 68 (41.5%) had children under the age of 18 living in them. Of all households, 62.8% were married-couple households, 0.0% were cohabiting couple households, 23.2% had a female householder with no partner present, and 14.0% had a male householder with no partner present. 33 households (20.1%) were one person, and 26 (15.9%) were one person aged 65 or older. The average household size was 2.45. There were 126 families (76.8% of all households).

There were 175 housing units at an average density of 86.2 units per square mile (33.3 units/km^{2}), of which 164 (93.7%) were occupied. Of these, 116 (70.7%) were owner-occupied, and 48 (29.3%) were occupied by renters. The homeowner vacancy rate was 0.0% and the rental vacancy rate was 7.7%.

Racial composition as of the 2020 census
Race	Number	Percent
White	279	69.4%
Black or African American	0	0.0%
American Indian and Alaska Native	5	1.2%
Asian	16	4.0%
Native Hawaiian and Other Pacific Islander	0	0.0%
Some other race	50	12.4%
Two or more races	52	12.9%
Hispanic or Latino (of any race)	111	27.6%

== History ==
Clarksburg has been settled in stages dating back as early as the 1850s when Merritt Island was first cleared and developed for agricultural uses. Postal authorities first established a post office in 1876, under the name "Clarksburgh" and changed the name to "Clarksburg" in 1893. The town was named after Robert C. Clark who settled at the place in 1849. In the 1920s the New Holland Land Company began subdividing the tracts in the area and formally established Clarksburg as an unincorporated community. Clarksburg is unique among small California towns in that many of the families who initially settled the area are still present, thus lending a small-town charm to the community.

=== Present day ===
The community is mostly centered on the two churches in town, the Holland Market, the volunteer fire department, the three schools, and the public library. The 1930s era Old Sugar Mill (which closed in 1988) is now the center of development with 125 new homes proposed for construction on the property. This will be the first significant development since the Old Sugar Mill was built in the 1930s. The project is currently stayed by the Delta Protection Commission until it is made compliant with their Resource and Management Plan. Appeals were made to this State of California commission by the Natural Resources Defense Council and the Concerned Citizens of Clarksburg. As of February 2008 the Old Sugar Mill development was involved in significant litigation. A portion of the original Old Sugar Mill is now home to a modern wine tasting and production facility.

The Bogle Winery on Merritt Island has become the most famous of the Clarksburg appellation vintners with their wines being sold worldwide and being served at the White House as of 2007.

The population in 2008 is approximately 300. The portion of Sacramento County directly across the Sacramento River was once considered part of the community due to the ferry crossing that existed at Clarksburg from 1920 until the Freeport Bridge opened on New Year's Day in 1930. The ferry sank in November 1928. Thus, some older citizens that still reside in the community still refer to that adjoining area of Sacramento County as Clarksburg.

There are three schools in Clarksburg: Delta Elementary Charter School, Clarksburg Middle School, and Delta High School. All three schools are a part of the River Delta Unified School District.

=== Architectural heritage ===
Architect William Raymond Yelland would spend summers in Clarksburg with family. W.R. Yelland designed several buildings in the town of Clarksburg including several homes, the Clarksburg Community Church, and the Sugar Mill. W.R. Yelland is most noted for his Arts and Crafts and Storybook Houses of the 1920s and 1930s.

== Economy ==
What few industries that exist in the area are mostly involved in supporting the agricultural concerns of the area. Agriculture in the area principally includes wine grapes, dichondra seed, and tomatoes. Alfalfa is also found to occur but it is not the principal crop as it was prior to the 1920s.

== Events and culture ==
The Paul Reese Memorial Clarksburg Country Run occurs every November as it has since 1965 and includes a 20-mile (32 km) race, a half-marathon, a 5k fun run, and children's events.

The Friends of the Clarksburg Library sponsor The Wines of Clarksburg fundraiser every year to support the local library. The event is typically hosted at the New Holland Land Company's former site and the event is a good excuse to view this example of historic, California Delta architecture.

== Education ==
Clarksburg is served by the River Delta Joint Unified School District.

== Notable people ==
- Charles Carroll "Tony" Eason, IV (born October 8, 1959, in Blythe, California, raised in Walnut Grove) is a former American football quarterback who attended Delta High School in Clarksburg before playing in the NFL for the New England Patriots and New York Jets. Eason retired after the 1990 NFL season and currently resides in California.
