= Ubulu Okiti =

Ubulu Okiti is an Anioma community located in the Aniocha area, Delta State, Nigeria. The Ubulu Okiti community is settled along the Asaba - Benin expressway, an east–west link that connects passengers from Eastern Nigeria to Western Nigeria as far as Lagos. (The expressway also connects passengers from Western Nigeria's Ogun state to Eastern Nigeria via Benin and with Asaba as the gateway into the South East). Fatal road accidents near Ubulu Okiti have been reported in newspapers.
