= The Delta =

The Delta may refer to:

- The Niger Delta, an oil-rich region of Nigeria
- The Arkansas Delta, one of the six natural regions of the state of Arkansas
- The Mississippi Delta, the distinctive northwest section of the U.S. state of Mississippi that lies between the Mississippi and Yazoo rivers
- The Nile Delta, where the Nile empties into the Mediterranean Sea
- The Sacramento River Delta
- The Delta (film), 1996
- The Delta (novel), a 1987 novel by Colin Wilson

== See also ==
- Delta (disambiguation)
- River delta
