= Delta Secondary School =

Delta Secondary School may refer to:

- Delta Secondary School (Hamilton, Ontario) in Hamilton, Ontario, Canada
- Delta Secondary School, Warri in Delta, Nigeria
- Delta Secondary School (Delta, British Columbia) in Delta, British Columbia, Canada
- Delta Secondary School Windhoek in Windhoek, Namibia
- Delta Secondary School (Singapore), a precursor of Bukit Merah Secondary School
- North Delta Secondary School, Delta, British Columbia, Canada
- South Delta Secondary School, Tsawwassen, British Columbia, Canada

== See also ==
- Delta (disambiguation)
- Delta High School (disambiguation)
