= Delta State Polytechnic =

There were three Polytechnics in Delta State, Nigeria, all established on 12 November 2002, located in Ogwashi-Uku (Aniocha South Local Government Area), Ozoro (Isoko North Local Government Area), and Otefe-Oghara, Oghara (Ethiope West Local Government Area). However, the Polytechnic that was in Ozoro has been transformed into a University by the state government. The Government of Delta State reached an understanding with the University of Westminster, London to assist in management and technical support for the institutions. The institutions are centres of excellence in Agriculture, Computing and Information Technology, Fashion Design and Arts and Sports. Besides their primary areas of specialization, all students are trained in Computing and Information Technology as well as business and entrepreneurship.

The Ogwashi-Uku polytechnic has schools that offer National Diplomas and Higher National Diplomas in Art and Design (Fashion Design and Clothing Technology, and General Art), Business (Accountancy, Business Administration, Human Resource Management, Marketing, Mass Communication, Office Technology Management and Production Operations Management), Engineering (Agriculture and Bio-environmental Engineering, Civil Engineering, Computer Engineering, Electrical Engineering, Foundry Engineering, Mechanical Engineering, Metallurgical Engineering and Welding and Fabrication) and Applied Sciences (Computer Science, Mathematics and Statistics and Hospitality and Tourism Management).

The Ozoro polytechnic was the most developed among the polytechnics, it had schools that offers National Diplomas and Higher National Diplomas in Agriculture, Business Studies, Science and Technology, Engineering and Environmental Studies.

The Otefe-Oghara polytechnic has schools that offer National Diplomas in Business Studies (Accountancy, Banking and Finance and Business Administration), Computing and IT (Computer Science and Statistics), and Engineering (Computer Engineering, Electronic and Electrical Engineering and Mechanical Engineering). It also has a School of Preliminary Studies that introduces all students to basic Business Studies and Science Technology.

== See also ==
- List of polytechnics in Nigeria
