= Delta Academy =

Delta Academy may refer to:

- Delta Academy (Mississippi) in Marks, Mississippi
- Central Delta Academy in Inverness, Mississippi
- Delta Streets Academy in Greenwood, Mississippi
- Delta Academy in El Paso, Texas
- Delta Academy in the Las Vegas Valley, Nevada

== See also ==
- Delta (disambiguation)
