= Tony Eason =

American football player (born 1959)

No. 11
- Position: Quarterback

Personal information
- Born: October 8, 1959 (age 67); Blythe, California, U.S.
- Listed height: 6 ft 4 in (1.93 m)
- Listed weight: 212 lb (96 kg)

Career information
- High school: Delta (Clarksburg, California)
- College: Illinois
- NFL draft: 1983: 1st round, 15th overall pick

Career history
- New England Patriots (1983–1989); New York Jets (1989–1990)

Awards and highlights
- Third-team All-American (1982); 2× First-team All-Big Ten (1981, 1982)

Career NFL statistics
- Passing attempts: 1,564
- Passing completions: 911
- Completion percentage: 58.2%
- TD–INT: 61–51
- Passing yards: 11,142
- Passer rating: 79.7
- Stats at Pro Football Reference

Charles Carroll "Tony" Eason IV (born October 8, 1959) is an American former professional football quarterback who played in the National Football League (NFL) for eight seasons, primarily with the New England Patriots. He played college football for the Illinois Fighting Illini, receiving third-team All-American and two first-team All-Big Ten selections between 1981 and 1982. Taken 15th overall by the Patriots in the 1983 NFL draft, he was one of the six quarterbacks selected during the first round.

Eason served as New England's primary starter from 1984 to 1986, helping the team make their Super Bowl debut in Super Bowl XX. Competing as the starter with Steve Grogan throughout his Patriots tenure, Eason was released during the 1989 season. He spent his final two seasons as a backup with the New York Jets.

== Early life ==
Eason grew up in Walnut Grove, California, and attended Delta High School in Clarksburg, California, a school with only 250 students at the time. His brother is former professional NFL player Bo Eason. Despite an impressive high school football career, Eason's only scholarship offer from a Division I school came from the University of the Pacific in Stockton, California. However, he was denied admission due to poor grades, and he opted to attend American River Junior College in Sacramento, California. Eason spent two years playing football at American River in 1978 and 1979.

== College career ==
Eason transferred to the University of Illinois and sat out the 1980 season. He was 6 feet, 4 inches tall, and weighed 205 pounds when he took over as the starting quarterback for the Fighting Illini in 1981. His first start for Illinois matched Eason against Pitt's quarterback Dan Marino; the Illini lost, 26–6, but Eason made an impressive debut as he completed 23 of 37 passes for 207 yards (slightly better than the 204 yards passing by Marino in the game). In his first season with the Illini, Eason led the Illini to a 7–4 record, but the team was ineligible to play in a bowl game due to sanctions imposed by the Big Ten Conference. Eason completed 248 of 406 passes (61.1%) for 3,360 yards and 20 touchdowns. The Illini ranked third in the nation in passing in 1981, as Eason led the Big Ten in passing efficiency and total offense and set nine conference records, including records for total offense, completions, passing yardage, and passing touchdowns. He also edged out Art Schlichter as the quarterback on the Associated Press' All Big-Ten football team.

Eason earned the nickname "Champaign Tony" while playing at Illinois, based upon the city in which the university is located.

As a senior in 1982, Eason accumulated a school record 3,671 passing yards and led the Illini to a 7–4 regular season record and its first appearance in a bowl games since the 1964 Rose Bowl. He also broke five NCAA passing records in 1982 and tied four more. The NCAA records set by Eason in 1982 included most total yards per game in a career (299.5), most passing yards per game in a career (300.4), most completions per game in a career (23.9), and most total yards in first two seasons (6,589). Eason finished second in the voting behind Michigan's Anthony Carter for the Chicago Tribune Silver Football trophy as the Most Valuable Player in the Big Ten.

Eason's final game for Illinois was the 1982 Liberty Bowl, which also marked the last head coaching appearance of Bear Bryant for Alabama. Although Illinois lost the game, 21–15, Eason registered a record 433 passing yards in the game. Eason also threw four of the Illini's seven interceptions in the game.

In the 1983 East–West Shrine Game, Eason led the East team to 26–25 win over a West team led by John Elway. Eason completed 21 of 34 passes for 202 yards and two touchdowns in the game.

Eason still holds many of the school's all-time passing records, including the following:

- Passing yardage in a season – 3,671 (1982)
- Passing yards per game in a season – 333.7 (1982)
- Passing yards per game in a career – 300.4 (1981–82)
- Pass attempts in a season – 505 (1982)
- Pass efficiency in a season – 140.0 (1981)
- Pass efficiency in a career – 133.8 (1981–82)
- Most interceptions in a season – 19 (1982)
- Consecutive pass completions – 14, at Iowa, October 30, 1982

== Professional career ==
=== New England Patriots ===
Eason was selected by the New England Patriots in the first round (15th overall pick) of the 1983 NFL draft. He was one of six quarterbacks picked in the first round of the 1983 Draft along with John Elway (1st pick), Todd Blackledge (7th pick), Jim Kelly (14th pick), Ken O'Brien (24th pick), and Dan Marino (27th pick). The idea was for him to eventually take over for longtime starter Steve Grogan, who had gone 5–8 in his last two injury-ridden seasons.

Eason appeared in 72 games (49 as a starter) for the Patriots between 1983 and 1989. His rookie season saw him start the last four games of the year after Grogan started Week 1 through 12 and got them to a 6–6 record, with Eason playing spot appearances, such as being put in to throw the last eleven passes against Cleveland in a rout that ended with Eason throwing his first interception (and then second) in a 30–0 loss. In his first start against the New York Jets the following week, Eason went 13-of-27 with an interception in a 26–3 loss. Eason went 2–2 as a starter, throwing just one touchdown to five interceptions. In 1984, Grogan was named the starter, but Week 3 saw Eason tapped in to replace Grogan midway against the Seattle Seahawks. He went 12-of-22 for 126 yards and two touchdowns in the 38–23 victory. From that point, Eason started the rest of the season, going 7-6 along the way while completing 259 out of 431 passes (60.1%) for 3,228 yards and a passer rating of 93.4—third best in the NFL. His best game came against the Indianapolis Colts when he threw for a career high four touchdowns in a 50–17 victory. Eason also set an undesirable record in 1984 by being sacked 59 times for a loss of 409 yards; his 59 sacks were the most in NFL history at the time and currently stands as the ninth highest single season total. Eason also led the NFL in interception percentage in the 1984 season with only 1.9% of his passes being intercepted.

==== Super Bowl XX season (1985) ====
In the 1985 season, Eason was the primary starter, doing so for the first six games, which saw New England win three of them but head coach Raymond Berry inserted Grogan during the Week 6 contest against the Buffalo Bills after Eason threw two interceptions that saw the Patriots win. Grogan was tapped to start the following six games, where New England went on a six-game winning streak until he suffered a broken leg against the Jets in Week 12. Eason became the primary quarterback from that point on, guiding New England to wins in three of their last four games, including a 34–23 win over the Cincinnati Bengals in the season finale highlighted by a 50-yard touchdown pass to Stanley Morgan. In total, Eason threw for 2,156 yards but had 11 touchdowns to 17 interceptions. New England clinched a playoff spot as the final Wild Card team and would be on the road for any playoff game they played. It was an historic one as they became the first team in NFL history since the 1978 wildcard playoff expansion to win three road postseason games to reach the Super Bowl. In the Wild Card Game against the Jets, he threw 12-of-16 for 179 yards with a touchdown as the Patriots beat the Jets 26–14 to win their first playoff game since 1963. He went just 7-of-14 for 117 yards with a touchdown against the Los Angeles Raiders in the Divisional Round, but the Patriots won 27–20 on the strength of forcing six turnovers (including the winning score being a fumble recovery) and offensive play from Craig James to advance to their first AFC Championship Game appearance against the Miami Dolphins, who had not lost to New England in the Miami Orange Bowl since 1966. Eason threw three touchdowns against the Miami Dolphins in the AFC Championship Game to prevail 31–14.

The Patriots made their first appearance in a Super Bowl in franchise history that year, meeting the Chicago Bears with Jim McMahon, Richard Dent, and Walter Payton. The Bears' famed 46 defense defeated Eason and the Patriots in Super Bowl XX, the Bears defense sacked Eason three times for 28 yards. He became the first and so far only starting quarterback in Super Bowl history to not have a pass completion, finishing 0-for-6 with no interceptions for a passer rating of 39.6, and was sacked three times. With the Patriots trailing the Bears 20-3 Eason was replaced with veteran Steve Grogan, but the Patriots still lost the game, by the final score of 46–10, which at the time was the largest winning margin of any Super Bowl. Famed lineman John Hannah stated his preference for Grogan over Eason stating, "Tony should wear a skirt instead of a uniform. When he was hurt before we played the Bears in the Super Bowl, we were hoping he’d stay hurt so Steve could play." Eason was later stated to have a fever of 101 with what was stated to be a "viral infection." Berry stated that he took out an uncomfortable Eason for Grogan as what he thought was a good move with the score at 20–3.

In 2008, ESPN ranked Eason's performance as the worst (82nd out of 82) in the history of the Super Bowl, noting, "In addition to his awful passing stats, he lost a fumble and not surprisingly was yanked in the second quarter."

=== After Super Bowl XX ===
The following season, Eason started in fourteen games, missing two due to injury. He threw for 3,328 yards (on 61.6% passing) with 19 touchdowns to 10 interceptions as the Patriots went 11–5 to clinch their first AFC East title in eight years along with reach the postseason in consecutive years for the first time in franchise history. His passer rating of 89.2 was fourth best in the NFL. He had his best game in passing against the Seahawks that year, throwing a career best 414 yards on 26-of-45 passing in a 38–31 loss. Due to the playoff structure, they were the third seed travelling to play the AFC West champion Denver Broncos, who hosted as the 2 seed. Eason opened the scoring for New England on a touchdown pass to Stanley Morgan to make it 7–3 in the second quarter, and the teams were tied at 10 at halftime. Eason then threw another touchdown pass to Morgan to give them a 17–13 lead, but the Broncos took the lead back in the same quarter. Eason went 13-of-24 for 194 yards with two touchdowns while Elway threw for more yards on the same amount of completions with two interceptions, but Eason was sacked six times as New England could not capitalize on any of their four drives in the fourth quarter, with Rulon Jones sacking Eason in the endzone (with 1:32 remaining) to cap the scoring off in a 22–17 loss for New England. Denver won the following week to reach the Super Bowl. Eason missed the opening game of the 1987 season due to a groin injury, which opened the door for Grogan to play. Eason then started the second week against the New York Jets, a 43–24 loss. The NFLPA strike took place not long after that saw replacement players be used to make up for cancelling Week 3, where the replacements played from Week 4 to Week 6. After that, Eason started the Week 6 game, going 22-of-42 for a touchdown and an interception. He was the starter in the Week 7 game versus the Raiders, throwing just three passes before a tackle by Stacey Toran saw Eason suffer a separated shoulder that ended up knocking him out for the remainder of the season. In a season that saw New England use five quarterbacks, Eason had just three starts.

In February 1988, Berry designated Grogan as the starter with Eason as the backup. He did not express approval and threatened to sit out the year, which also saw the Patriots consider cutting his base salary ($875,000) by over 25%. Eason did not see the field for the 1988 season until Week 15. He started versus Tampa Bay and went 16-of-27 for 155 yards with two interceptions but managed to win 10–7 in overtime when a pair of his passes hit Irving Fryar to set up a game-winning field goal after Tampa elected to kick after winning the coin toss due to the wind. Eason then visited Denver for the Week 16 matchup as the starter and was 12-of-16 for 94 yards before being taken out late for Grogan in a 21–10 loss that saw New England miss out on a playoff spot. The 1989 season saw the Patriots keep four quarterbacks in their roster – Eason, Grogan, Doug Flutie, and Marc Wilson, with the latter being insurance for Grogan. Eason won on opening day with a 15-of-23 performance for 273 yards with two touchdowns and interceptions each. This was followed by losses to Miami and Seattle, with the latter seeing him go 17-of-33 for 147 yards with an interception. Eason was benched for Flutie after the game. He was later let go by the team and claimed off waivers by the New York Jets during the 1989 NFL season, after Eason refused to take a cut in pay after he was demoted to fourth-string on New England's roster with team owner Victor Kiam stating that he thought Eason would be the starter with the $2.3-million & two-year contract that he signed. Eason reluctantly joined the team in November after considering not reporting due to not wanting to be in competition with his "good friend" Ken O'Brien. He reported to the team to not give up the remainder of his salary. He started the last two games of the 1989 season for the Jets, which resulted in him throwing an interception in losses each time. He went 12-of-22 for 125 yards with an interception against the Bills in a 37–0 loss that ended up being his final career start. In the following season, he was relegated to the bench for all but 28 passes, going 4-for-5 for 64 yards against Tampa Bay in his final appearance in week 16. He retired after the season ended at the age of 31.

== Later life ==
In 2002, Eason coached basketball in the Sacramento area.

== Career statistics ==
Legend
**Bold**	Career high

=== NFL ===
Year	Team	Games			Passing								
Year	Team	GP	GS	Record	Cmp	Att	Pct	Yds	Avg	TD	Int	Lng	Rtg
1983	NE	16	4	2−2	46	95	48.4	557	5.9	1	5	35	48.4
1984	NE	16	13	7−6	259	431	60.1	3,228	**7.5**	**23**	8	76	**93.4**
1985	NE	16	10	6−4	168	299	56.2	2,156	7.2	11	**17**	**90**	67.5
1986	NE	15	14	10−4	**276**	**448**	61.6	**3,328**	7.4	19	10	49	89.2
1987	NE	4	3	1−2	42	79	53.2	453	5.7	3	2	45	72.4
1988	NE	2	2	1−1	28	43	**65.1**	249	5.8	0	2	26	61.1
1989	NE	3	3	1–2	57	105	54.3	761	7.2	3	4	45	71.2
1989	NYJ	2	2	0–2	22	36	61.1	255	7.1	1	2	63	68.6
1990	NYJ	16	0	–	13	28	46.4	155	5.5	0	1	31	49.0
Career		90	51	28−23	911	1,564	58.2	11,142	7.1	61	51	90	79.7

=== College ===
Season	Team	Games			Passing								Rushing			
Season	Team	GP	GS	Record	Comp	Att	Pct	Yards	Avg	TD	Int	Rate	Att	Yards	Avg	TD
1981	Illinois	11	11	7–4	248	406	61.1	3,360	**8.3**	**20**	14	**140.0**	**87**	-29	-0.3	**5**
1982	Illinois	12	12	7–5	**313**	**505**	**62.0**	**3,671**	7.3	18	**19**	127.3	73	**10**	**0.1**	1
Career		23	23	14–9	561	911	61.6	7,031	7.7	38	33	132.9	160	-19	-0.1	6
