= Rio Vista High School =

School in Rio Vista, California, U.S.

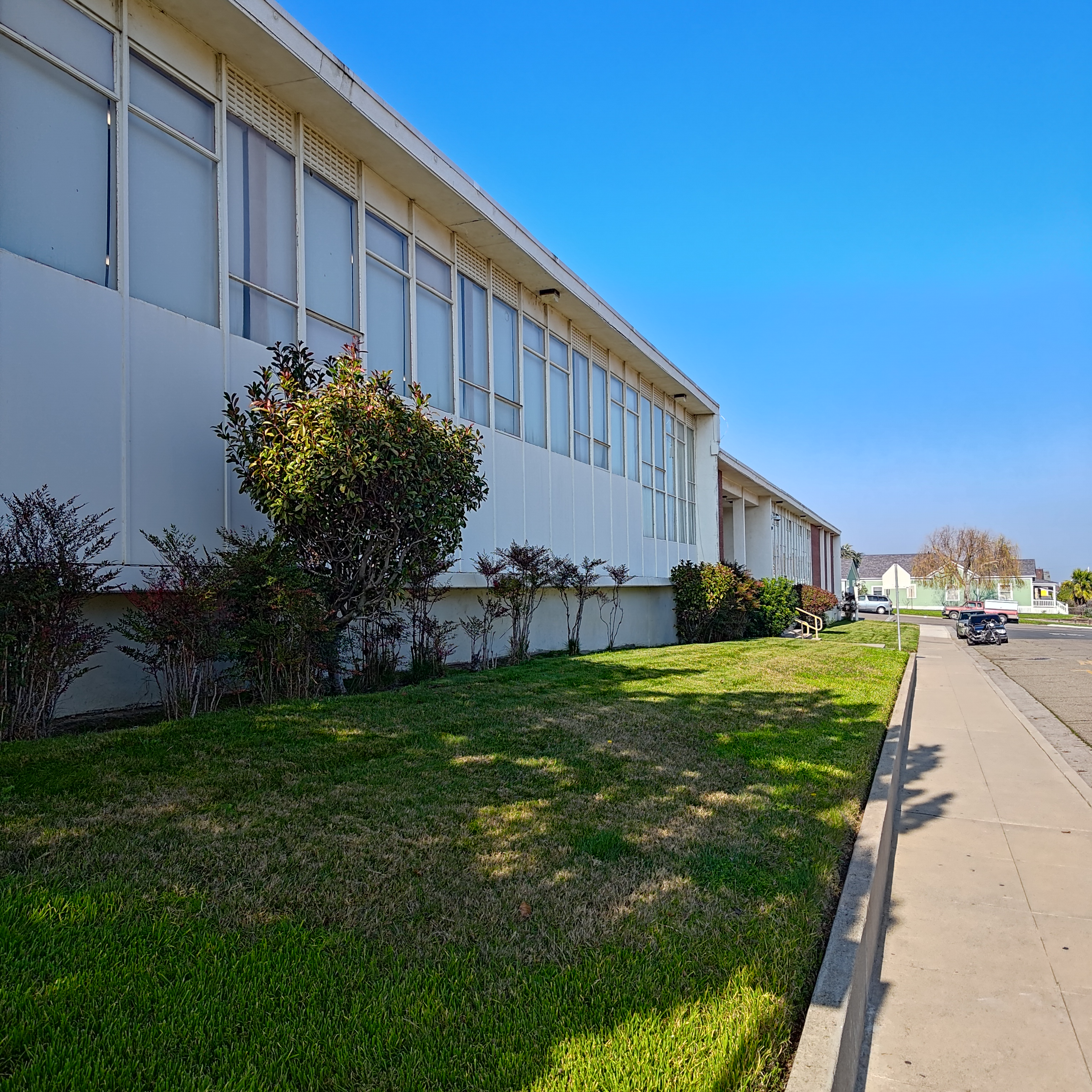

Location
- 410 South Fourth Street, Rio Vista, California, United States; 38.1545°N 121.6977°W

Information
- Motto: "It's great to be a RAM Respect Achieve Make a difference"
- School district: River Delta Unified School District
- Staff: 21.12 (FTE)
- Grades: 9-12
- Enrollment: 350 (2023-2024)
- Student to teacher ratio: 16.57
- Color
- Mascot: Ram
- Rival: Delta High School
- Website: www.rdusd.org/schools/rio-vista-high-school/index

Rio Vista High School is a public high school located in the city of Rio Vista, California. The school is in the River Delta Unified School District.

== Statistics ==
=== Demographics 2024–2025 ===
White	African American	American Indian	Latino	Asian	Two or More Races	Filipinos	Pacific Islander
34.4%	2.5%	0.6%	52.1%	0.3%	8.2%	1.3%	0.6%
109	8	2	165	1	26	4	2

=== Enrollment by Subgroup 2024–2025 ===
English Learners	Foster Youth	Homeless Youth	Migrant Education	Students with Disabilities	Socioeconomically Disadvantaged	Total students
37	2	12	32	43	233	317

== "College Going Rate" for 2022–2023 ==
Race / Ethnicity	High School Completers	High School Completers Enrolled In College	College-Going Rate	Enrolled In College (In-State)	Enrolled In College (Out-of-State)	No Record of College Enrollment
Hispanic or Latino	47	29	61.7%	53.2%	8.5%	38.3%
White	31	16	51.6%	45.2%	6.5%	48.4%
River Delta Joint Unified District Total	174	102	58.6%	53.4%	5.2%	41.4%

=== Standardized testing for 2015 - 2016 ===
SAT Scores for 2015-16
	Average Reading Score	Average Math Score	Average Writing Score
Rio Vista High	463	465	456
River Delta District	471	468	459
Statewide	484	484	477

== Student activities ==
=== Athletics ===
- Boys' Basketball
- Girls' Basketball
- Baseball
  - 1987-88 Section Champions
- Softball
- Volleyball
- Football
- Girls’ Soccer
- Boys’ Soccer
- Golf
- Swimming
- Wrestling
