= WAGR D class =

Class of Australian 4-6-4T locomotives

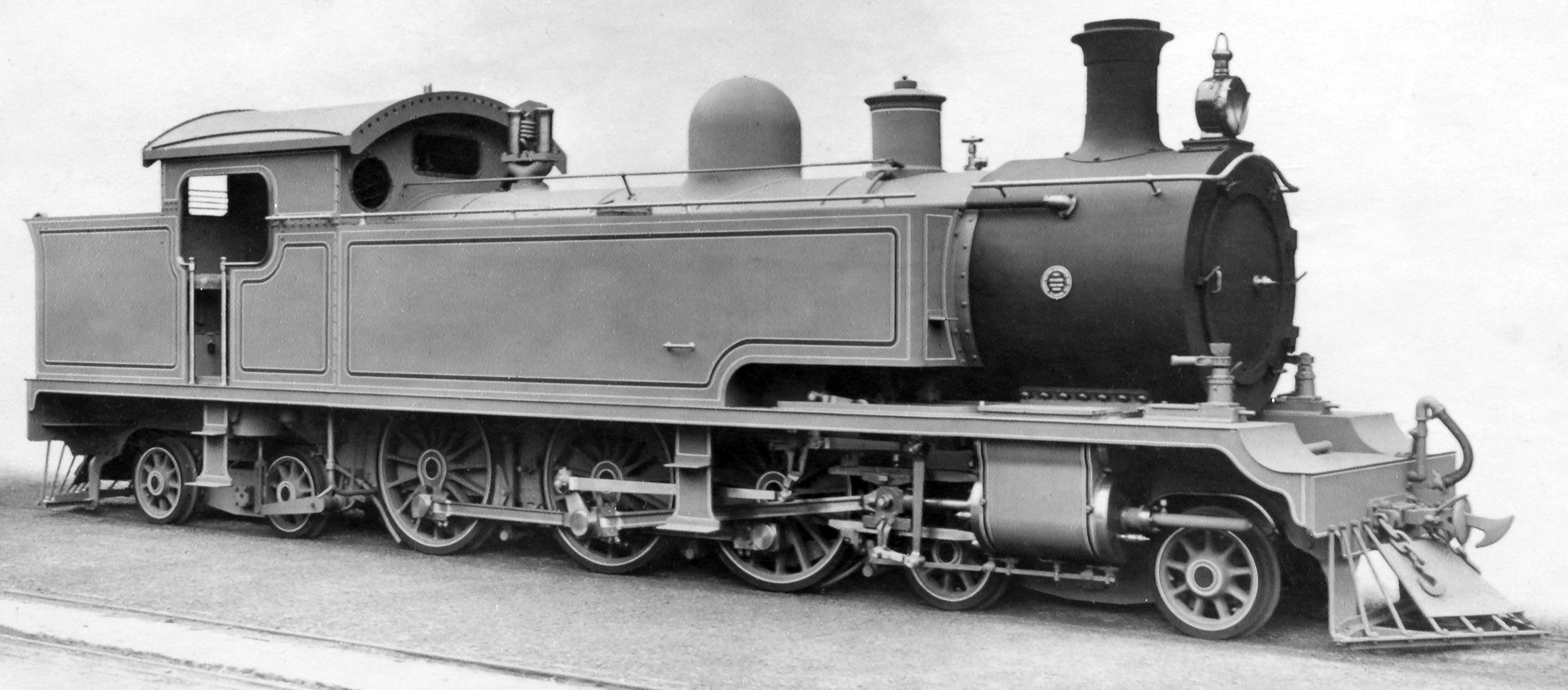
- Builder's photograph of a D class
Type and origin
- Power type: Steam
- Builder: North British Locomotive Company
- Serial number: 19709-19728
- Build date: 1912
- Total produced: 20
Specifications
- Configuration
  - Whyte: 4-6-4T
- Gauge: 3 ft 6 in (1,067 mm)
- Driver dia.: 4 ft 6 in (1,372 mm)
- Length: 42 ft 6 in (12.95 m)
- Loco weight: As built: 68 long tons 5 cwt (152,900 lb or 69.3 t); Superheated: 70 long tons 0 cwt (156,800 lb or 71.1 t)
- Fuel type: Coal
- Fuel capacity: 4 long tons 0 cwt (9,000 lb or 4.1 t)
- Water cap.: 1,600 imp gal (7,300 L; 1,900 US gal)
- Firebox
  - Grate area: 18.63 sq ft (1.731 m^{2})
- Boiler pressure: As built: 175 lbf/in^{2} (1.21 MPa); Superheated: 160 lbf/in^{2} (1.10 MPa)
- Cylinder size: As built: 17 in × 23 in (432 mm × 584 mm); Superheated: 18 in × 23 in (457 mm × 584 mm)
Performance figures
- Tractive effort: As built: 17,233 lbf (76.66 kN); Superheated: 18,768 lbf (83.48 kN)
- Factor of adh.: As built: 4.7; Superheated: 4.6
Career
- Operators: Western Australian Government Railways
- Numbers: D368-D387
- Disposition: all scrapped

The WAGR D class was a class of 4-6-4T tank locomotive operated by the Western Australian Government Railways (WAGR) between 1912 and 1964.

== History ==
In 1911 the WAGR placed an order with the North British Locomotive Company for twenty 4-6-4T locomotives to haul suburban passenger services in Perth. All entered service between June and September 1912. Commencing in 1932, all bar D386 were rebuilt as the Ds class with superheated boilers. In 1935 D377 was fitted with larger side tanks, increasing its water capacity by 210 imp gal (950 L; 250 US gal); these were removed in May 1959. With the arrival of the ADH class diesel multiple units in 1953, withdrawals commenced with the last withdrawn in November 1965.

The D class was also the basis for the later Dm and Dd classes of tank engine, which continued this role until the end of steam.

== Class list ==
The numbers and periods in service of each member of the D class were as follows:

Builder's number	Road number	In service	Superheated	Withdrawn	Notes
19709	368	6 July 1912	1 April 1933	5 March 1964	
19710	369	13 July 1912	3 July 1935	7 October 1963	
19711	370	6 July 1912	21 December 1933	14 February 1952	
19712	371	6 July 1912	15 May 1933	18 November 1965	Stowed 31 July 1964
19713	372	6 July 1912	23 September 1947	22 July 1963	
19714	373	29 June 1912	15 November 1939	5 March 1964	
19715	374	29 June 1912	30 May 1934	23 April 1963	
19716	375	13 July 1912	9 April 1932	19 October 1964	Stowed 1 April 1964
19717	376	29 June 1912	27 April 1934	12 November 1963	Stowed 2 September 1963
19718	377	20 July 1912	5 September 1935	15 May 1962	Tanks extended 5 September 1935 to May 1959
19719	378	13 July 1912	21 April 1944	12 December 1963	
19720	379	21 September 1912	6 November 1933	31 October 1961	
19721	380	14 September 1912	25 July 1947	17 March 1954	
19722	381	28 September 1912	19 March 1932	16 March 1964	
19723	382	21 September 1912	27 September 1935	1 March 1962	
19724	383	21 September 1912	18 April 1931	16 September 1953	
19725	384	28 September 1912	29 March 1934	16 August 1962	
19726	385	28 September 1912	16 May 1932	16 August 1954	
19727	386	21 September 1912		15 May 1950	Not superheated
19728	387	14 September 1912	14 December 1946	19 June 1953	

== Namesakes ==
The D class designation was previously used for the D class locomotive that was withdrawn in 1903. It was reused in the 1970s when the D class diesel locomotives entered service.

== See also ==
- Rail transport in Western Australia
- List of Western Australian locomotive classes
