= DELTA (taxonomy) =

Data format

DELTA (DEscription Language for TAxonomy) is a data format used in taxonomy for recording descriptions of living things. It is designed for computer processing, allowing the generation of identification keys, diagnosis, etc.

It is widely accepted as a standard and many programs using this format are available for various taxonomic tasks.

It was devised by the CSIRO Australian Division of Entomology in 1971 to 2000, with a notable part taken by Dr. Michael J. Dallwitz. More recently, the Atlas of Living Australia (ALA) rewrote the DELTA software in Java so it can run in a Java environment and across multiple operating systems. The software package can now be found at and downloaded from the ALA site.

== DELTA System ==
The DELTA System is a group of integrated programs that are built on the DELTA format. The main program is the DELTA Editor, which provides an interface for creating a matrix of characters for any number taxa. A whole suite of programs can be found and run from within the DELTA editor which allow for the output of an interactive identification key, called Intkey. Other powerful features include the output of natural language descriptions, full diagnoses, and differences among taxa.
