= Raph Uwechue =

Nigerian diplomat and publisher (1935–2014)

- Born: Raphaël Chukwu Uwechue; 13 May 1935; Ogwashi-Uku, Delta State, British Nigeria
- Died: 13 March 2014 (aged 78); Abuja, Nigeria
- Education: University of Ibadan Graduate Institute of International Studies
- Occupations: Diplomat and publisher

Raphaël Chukwu Uwechue (13 May 1935 – 13 March 2014), often abbreviated as Raph Uwechue, was a Nigerian minister, diplomat and publisher. He is a former president-general of the Ohanaeze Ndigbo, an Igbo socio-cultural organization in Nigeria.

== Training ==
Born on 13 May 1934, in Ogwashi-Uku, Delta State, Nigeria, Uwechue attended St. John's College in Kaduna from 1949 to 1954. He graduated from the University of Ibadan in 1960 with a degree in history. In 1964, he obtained a diploma in international law from the Graduate Institute of International Studies in Geneva, Switzerland. He was a doctoral student in political science at the École pratique des hautes études from 1970 to 1973.

== Career ==
Uwechue entered Nigeria's foreign service at its inception in 1960 and served in Cameroon, Pakistan and Mali. In 1966, he opened the Nigerian embassy in Paris, France, as its first envoy. From 1967 to 1967, during the Nigerian Civil War, he acted as Biafra's representative in Paris. He was then made ambassador to Liberia and to the United Nations Mission in Côte d'Ivoire.

After leaving the foreign service in 1970, Uwechue became a publisher of books and magazines on Africa. From 1971, he was editor-in-chief of Africa magazine ("an international business, economic and political monthly" produced in London by the Africa Journals Group Limited), publisher of Africa Yearbook from 1976, and from 1977 was publisher and editor-in-chief of the renowned "Know Africa" series, a three-volume encyclopaedia comprising Africa Today, Africa Who's Who and Makers of Modern Africa.

In 1999, Uwechue became the Special Presidential Envoy on Conflict Resolution in Africa to former President Olusegun Obasanjo. In that role, Uwechue played an active role in the peaceful resolution of the Sierra Leone Civil War.

He was made minister of health under President Shehu Shagari in 1993. From 2000 to 2007, he became the Economic Community of West African States' Special Representative in Cote d’Ivoire during the political crisis in that country.

In 2003, Uwechue was made an officer of the Order of the Federal Republic.

He died on 13 March 2014, at the National Hospital in Abuja, aged 79.
