= Delta, Kentucky =

Unincorporated community in Kentucky, United States

- Unincorporated community
- Location within Kentucky
- Coordinates: 36°51′52″N 84°39′26″W
- Country: United States
- State: Kentucky
- County: Wayne
- Elevation: 823 ft (251 m)
- Time zone: UTC-5 (Eastern (EST))
  - Summer (DST): UTC-4 (EDT)
- Area code: 606
- GNIS feature ID: 511779

Delta is an unincorporated community in Wayne County, Kentucky, United States.

A post office was established in 1906 and named for the first postmaster's daughter-in-law, Delta Casada Hammond.
