= Task Force Delta =

Task Force Delta is a generic military, or quasi-military (police, firefighters, etc), designation for a specific task force — a small temporary unit or detachment configured for a specific purpose or task. (A unit called Task Force Delta is often a part of a sequence of Task Forces Alpha, Bravo, Charlie, Delta, Echo, etc.)

Task Force Delta may refer to:

- A task force consisting of four infantry battalions of U.S. Marines and part of Operation Hastings and Operation Texas in Vietnam in 1966
- An element of the 1st Marine Air Wing operating from the Royal Thai Air Base Nam Phong in Thailand in 1972-1973
- Task Force Delta (psychic adepts), an ad hoc working group of 300 U.S. Army psychic adepts organized by Col. Frank Burns
- A unit of the Filipino Bureau of Fire Protection
- Task Force Delta, a fictional covert U.S. government agency in the Chase comic book series published by DC Comics

== See also ==
- Delta Force (disambiguation)
- Delta (disambiguation)
