= Delta State Polytechnic, Ogwashi-Uku =

Polytechnic in Delta State, Nigeria

The Delta State Polytechnic, Ogwashi-Uku is one of the three polytechnics in Delta State, Located in Ogwashi-Uku, Nigeria. The polytechnic offers National Diplomas and Higher National Diplomas in Art and Design (Fashion Design and Clothing Technology, and General Art), Business (Accountancy, Business Administration, Human Resource Management, Marketing, Mass Communication, Office Technology Management and Production Operations Management), Engineering (Agriculture and Bio-environmental Engineering, Civil Engineering, Computer Engineering, Electrical Electronics Engineering, Foundry Engineering, Mechanical Engineering, Metallurgical Engineering, Chemical Engineering, Industrial Maintenance Engineering and Welding and Fabrication) and Applied Sciences (Computer Science, Mathematics and Statistics and Hospitality and Tourism Management).

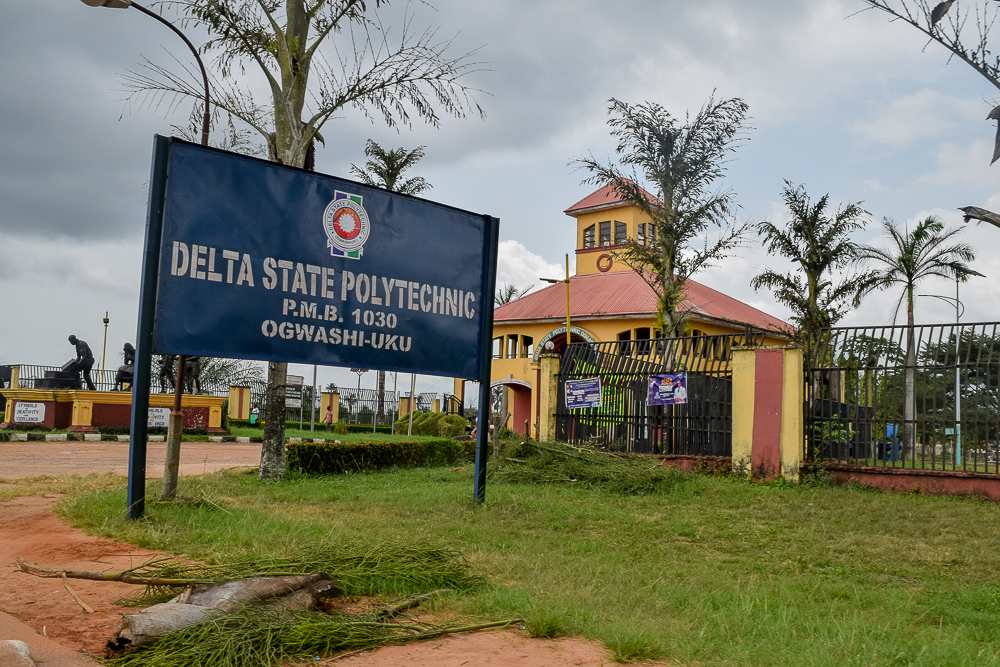
Delta state polytechnic

== History ==
The Delta State Polytechnic was established by the Delta State Polytechnic Ogwashi-Uku Law, 2002. The Polytechnic officially opened on Thursday January 23 when the second executive governor of Delta State James Onanefe Ibori formally inaugurated the school. The establishment of a new Polytechnic at Ogwashi-Uku was not without challenges. Before this time, there had been cries by the indigenes of the community for the reopening of Ogwashi-Uku Polytechnic which had earlier been closed in 1986 by the then Military Administrator Lt. Colonel Jerry Useni, four years after its establishment. The closure was seen as manifestly unfair as the Edo State University (now Ambrose Alli University, Ekpoma) which was established at the same time as Ogwashi-Uku Polytechnic was not affected. The work done by Michael Okonjo, who was then the chairman, the House committee on Education and that of his brother, late Isaac Okonjo who was the Secretary to the Bendel State government in ensuring the establishment of the Ogwashi-Uku polytechnic had been undone by a military decree. Unhappy with this development, the people continued to fight for the reopening of the Polytechnic. With the advent of democracy, the fight gathered momentum. On the forefront of the fight to reopen the Polytechnic were Chukwuka Benjamin Okonjo, the Obi of Ogwashi-Uku, Chief Oba Ilechie and other stake holders like Pascal Nwaorah, late Kisito Ilechie and many others.

In early 2002, the State Government in response to the yearning of the people decided to establish a new polytechnic. However to ensure equity, the Delta State Polytechnic Oghara and Delta State Polytechnic Ozoro were also established. The Delta State Polytechnic, Ogwashi-Uku begun academic activities in 2003 with a modest population of about 200 students, in three departments namely: Accountancy, Mechanical Engineering and Fashion & Clothing Technology under the first Rector of the Polytechnic, now Prof. J.E. O. Ovri. The Polytechnic at this time operated out of the former Delta Preparatory Primary School premises along Isah Road, Ogwashi-Uku with the Motto: Creativity for Development until 2004 when it moved to the former party secretariat (now Campus B which currently houses department of Fashion & Clothing Technology) along Ogwashi- Uku/Azagba road. In early 2005, the Polytechnic Rectory was moved to the Polytechnic Guest House at Kwale Junction. With the donation of a large piece of land measuring 2 km by 1 km by the host community and subsequently designated as the main campus (permanent site), the polytechnic moved the department of mechanical engineering to the main campus. By 2007, relocation of the Rectory, the Registry and other major department to the main campus had been completed. Since the establishment of the school, five substantive Rectors have been appointed. They include:

- Dr. J.E.O. Ovri: November 2002 – November 2006
- Professor A.O. Egwunyenga: August 2007 – August 2011
- Dr. (Mrs.) E.N. Mogekwu: March 2012 - February 2017
- Prof.(Mrs.) Stella Chiemeke: March 2017 - April 2021
- Prof. Emmanuel Achuenu: July 2021 till date
- During any interregnum, deputy rectors functioned as Acting Rectors. Those who served in acting capacity include:
- Mr. J.U. Akajagbor: Nov 2006 – August 2007
- Mr. S.E. Oseafiana: Aug 2011 – March 2012
- Mr Edafe John Atajeromavwo 2016

=== Substantive Rectors ===
==== Professor James Ovri-2003-2007 (Pioneering Development Efforts) ====
Prof. J.E.O. Ovri was the pioneer rector. Under his administration, the polytechnic moved the institution from the rented former D.P.P.S building to what is now known as Campus B, Campus C and the Permanent site. The relocation of the school is a testament of the rector's vision, and proactiveness. Aside these, it involved considerable repairs and refurnishing of the old buildings that had been abandoned for decades. Again new buildings which now constitute part of Office Technology Management (OTM) and Hospitality and Tourism Management (HTM) were constructed. In the academic sphere, Prof. Ovri ensured that the institution maintained very high standard. Under his stewardship, the polytechnic successfully expanded its National Board Technical Education(NBTE) approved programmes from the initial three to six. The programmes were not only approved but listed in the Joint Admissions and Matriculation Board (JAMB). The programmes include Accountancy (code-59972A), Business Administration (code-59975k), Fashion Design and Clothing Technology (5996G), Catering and Hotel Management (code-59977C), Mechanical Engineering (code-59978J) and Welding and Fabrication (code-59979F).

Mr AkajagborJ.U assumed duties as acting Rector at the expiration of Prof. Ovri's tenure. As acting Rector, Mr Akajagbor consolidated on the programmes and vision of his boss. It is on record, that Mr Akajagbor oversaw the relocation of the rectory to the permanent site. More importantly, Mr Akajagbor continued with the expansion of academic programmes of the polytechnic by successfully piloting the successful accreditation of Mass Communication and Fine Art.

==== Professor Andy Egwunyenga (2007–2011) ====
The appointment of Prof. Andy Egwunyenga in August 2007 as Rector of Delta State Polytechnic, Ogwashi-Uku began a new era in the annals of the institution. Like his predecessor, Prof Egwunyenga recognised the need to develop the polytechnic's academic, and infrastructure.

In the academic front, the polytechnic organized training seminars for staff. More importantly, Professor Egwunyenga expanded the programmes available in the Polytechnic by successfully securing accreditation for HND programmes in Accountancy, Fashion Design and Clothing Technology, Hospitality and Tourism Management, and ND in Computer Science as well as Maths and Statistics. Furthermore, accreditation visitations were made for the following programmes: National Diploma Programmes in Science Laboratory Technology: Tourism: Textile Technology and Insurance. The Higher National Diploma Programmes (HND): Business Administration: Mass Communication: Sculpture, Graphics and Painting. The Polytechnic also created a school of part time studies not just to boost internally generated revenue but to afford aspiring student the opportunity of acquiring polytechnic education.

In an attempt to secure the institution, Prof Egwunyenga constructed a fence from one end of the institution to the other with the school gate properly tucked at the middle. An upgrade and re-equipping of certain departments like department of hotel and tourism management, department of welding and fabrication, and the school library to NBTE standards was carried out. Besides, the polytechnic under the management of Prof Egwunyenga commenced the construction of Lecture Hall complex a building made up of four large classrooms and about 18 offices. The Polytechnic was also a beneficiary of AGIP and TETFUND infrastructural projects, like the ICT building, the AGIP halls among others. Part of the institution was also landscaped. In furtherance of the Polytechnic goal of educating its graduate in job creation, Prof. Egwunyenga successfully initiated the establishment of Student's Resource and Entrepreneurial Development Centre. Mr Oseafiana as deputy rector began to function as the Acting Rector. As acting Rector, Mr Steve Oseafiana consolidated the gains under Professor Egwunyenga.

==== Dr. Mrs. Edna NnekaMogekwu (Personal Profile) ====
Dr Mrs Edna Mogekwu hails from Ogwashi-Uku in Aniocha South local government area of Delta State. She started her primary school at Government School Agbor and finished at Nnabuwa Primary School, Ogwashi-Uku. She thereafter wrote her Cambridge at Our Lady of Apostles (Maryway), Ibadan and her Higher School Certificate Examination at Ibadan Grammar School.

She proceeded to Boston University in the United States, on a Federal Government Scholarship to study in Business Administration. After her first degree, she enrolled for a master's degree in Public Management at the prestigious University of Massachusetts. In 1982, she returned to Nigeria to participate in the National Youth Service Corps. Soon after her one-year service at the International Beer and Beverages Industries (IBBI) Ltd she was joined the services of Kaduna Polytechnic as a Lecturer. At Kaduna Polytechnic She was appointed Head of Department of Business Studies. As Head of department, she led her department to develop the HND Curriculum in Human Resource Management (HRM) and Production Operations Management. Thus Kaduna Polytechnic became the first Polytechnic to introduce and run these Programmes nationally through the National Board Technical Education(NBTE). She was appointed Dean School of business. When her term expired, she was appointed Academic Director where she managed a student population of 25,000 and staff strength of 700 (Academic and Non Academic) from 2003 to 2008. During her tenure as the Academic Director of the college, she not only managed sixteen (16) Departments effectively but ensured the introduction and accreditation of several new programmes.

In 2008, she was obtained a doctorate degree in management from University of Nigeria. Dr Mogekwu and is a Fellow of the Institute of Management Consultants, Corporate Administrators of Nigeria, a full member of Nigerian Institute of Management and many other Professional bodies. She has served as a member of various Governing Councils in State, Federal and Professional Agencies.

==== Professor Stella Chiemeke ====
Professor Stella Chinye CHIEMEKE obtained her professional training at the University of Lagos, Nigeria, where he received a Bachelor of Science Degree in Computer Science in 1986 and a Master of Science Degree in Computer Science in 1992. She obtained her PhD in Computer Science from the Federal University of Technology, Akure in 2004.

Prof. Emmanuel Achuenu

Professor Emmanuel Achuenu obtained his bachelor's degree at the University of Jos, Nigeria, where he received a bachelor's degree in Building in 1988 and a Master of Science Degree in Construction Management in 1993. He obtained his PhD in Construction Management also from University of Jos in 2000.
