= D-class destroyer =

D-class destroyer may refer to:

- D-class destroyer (1913), a class of Royal Navy torpedo boat destroyers
- C and D-class destroyer, a class of Royal Navy destroyers, built in 1930 and 1931
- Type 45 destroyer, a class of Royal Navy air defence destroyers, launched from 2006 to 2010
