= Delta (science magazine) =

Polish magazine

- Editor: Szymon Charzyński
- Frequency: monthly
- First issue: 1974
- Country: Poland
- Based in: Warsaw, Poland
- Language: Polish
- Website: www.deltami.edu.pl
- ISSN: 0137-3005

Delta is a monthly, popular science magazine published by the University of Warsaw in cooperation with:

- The Polish Mathematical Society,
- The Polish Physical Society,
- The Polish Astronomical Society,
- The Polish Information Processing Society.

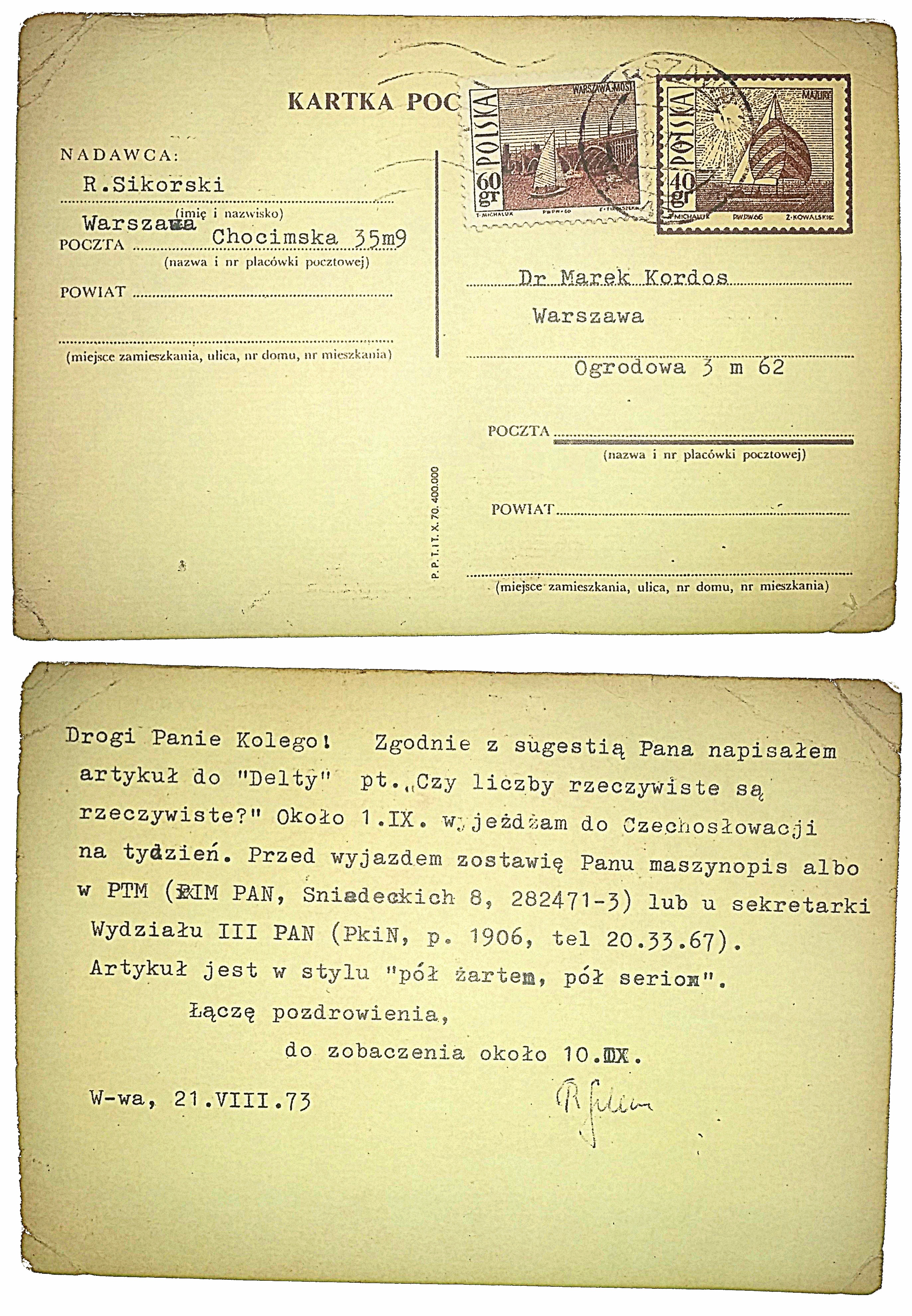
The response of prof. Roman Sikorski to the order request of the first article in Delta, 1973.

It has been published since 1974 (with a short break during the Martial law in Poland) and covers topics in mathematics, physics, astronomy, computer science and biology. The content of the Delta is directed towards high school and university students as well as researchers. The articles are mainly written by the researchers working at Polish universities, however, the magazine has also seen contributions from students. The chef editor since 2018 is Szymon Charzyński.
