= Delta View Joint Union School District =

School district in California, United States

Delta View Joint Union Elementary School District

Location
- 1201 Lacey Blvd. Hanford, California 93230 United States

District information
- Closed: 2009

Other information
- Website: www.dvjusd.k12.ca.us

Delta View Joint Union Elementary School District was a public school district based in Kings County, California, United States. In 2009, the district was absorbed by Kit Carson Elementary School District following a vote by the school board.
