= Delta Electric Company =

American electronics manufacturer

The Delta Electric Company was an American electronics manufacturer formed in 1913 in Marion, Indiana that produced lanterns, flashlights, automotive and bicycle lighting, battery tubes, horns, horn buttons, light switches, other battery-powered electrical parts, and bilge pumps. It was moved to Marion from an existing business in Chicago following a stock purchase.

Delta was purchased in 1964 or 1965 by the Novo Industrial Corporation. One of Novo Industrial Corp.'s subsidiary companies, King Bee Manufacturing Co., was moved to Marion, and its line of automotive lighting and safety equipment, including headlamps, safety lights, directional lights, mirrors, and reflectors for trucks, buses, trailers, and farm tractors, was merged into the Delta line of products.

United Air Cleaner (UAC) was a division of Nova Industrial Corp. that produced air cleaners.

Delta Electric was a division of Novo Industrial Corp. until 1968 when Novo became part of United Filtration Corp. Delta continued to operate as a division of United Filtration. After selling off the line of bicycle accessories, Delta continued to produce accessories for the automotive industry such as truck side-view mirrors and various automotive switches. By 1976 the company's main line had become warning buzzers for fire and security alarms.

Halle Industries Inc. had acquired Delta in 1977, and on March 31, 1978, shut down production of Delta Electric due to losing contracts for their smoke detector alarms to Japanese imports.
