= Hooley's delta function =

Mathematical function

- Named after: Christopher Hooley
- Publication year: 1979
- Author of publication: Paul Erdős
- First terms: 1, 2, 1, 2, 1, 2, 1, 2, 1, 2, 1, 3, 1, 2, 2, 2, 1
- OEIS index: A226898

In mathematics, Hooley's delta function, also called Erdős--Hooley delta-function, defines the maximum number of divisors of $n$ in $[u, eu]$ for all $u$, where $e$ is Euler's number. It is usually denoted $\Delta(n)$. The first few terms of this sequence are

$$1, 2, 1, 2, 1, 2, 1, 2, 1, 2, 1, 3, 1, 2, 2, 2, 1, 2, 1, 3, 2, 2, 1, 4, \dots$$

(sequence A226898 in the OEIS).

== History ==
The sequence was first introduced by Paul Erdős in 1974, then studied by Christopher Hooley in 1979.

In 2023, Dimitris Koukoulopoulos and Terence Tao proved that

$$\sum_{k=1}^n \Delta(k) \ll n (\log \log n)^{11/4}$$

for $n \ge 100$. In particular, the average order of $\Delta(n)$ to $k$ is $O((\log n)^k)$ for any $k > 0$.

In 2024, Kevin Ford along with Koukoulopoulos and Tao proved the lower bound

$$\sum_{k=1}^n \Delta(k) \gg n (\log \log n)^{1+\eta-\epsilon},$$

where $\epsilon$ is fixed, $\eta=0.3533227\ldots$, and $n \geq 100$.

== Usage ==
This function measures the tendency of divisors of a number to cluster.

The growth of this sequence is limited by $\Delta(mn) \leq \Delta(n) d(m)$, where $d(n)$ is the number of divisors of $n$.

== See also ==
- Divisor function
- Euler's number
