= Delta, Astrakhan Oblast =

Delta Дельта
- Settlement
- Location within Astrakhan Oblast Location within Russia
- Coordinates: 46°38′N 48°02′E
- Country: Russia
- Region: Astrakhan Oblast
- District: Krasnoyarsky District
- Time zone: UTC+4:00

Delta (Russian: Дельта) is a rural locality (a settlement) in Buzansky Selsoviet, Krasnoyarsky District, Astrakhan Oblast, Russia. The population was 72 as of 2010. There are 2 streets.

== Geography ==
Delta is located 42 km northwest of Krasny Yar (the district's administrative centre) by road. Talnikovy is the nearest rural locality.
