= NBR D class 0-6-0T =

Class of 40 British 0-6-0T locomotives

NBR D Class LNER Class J83
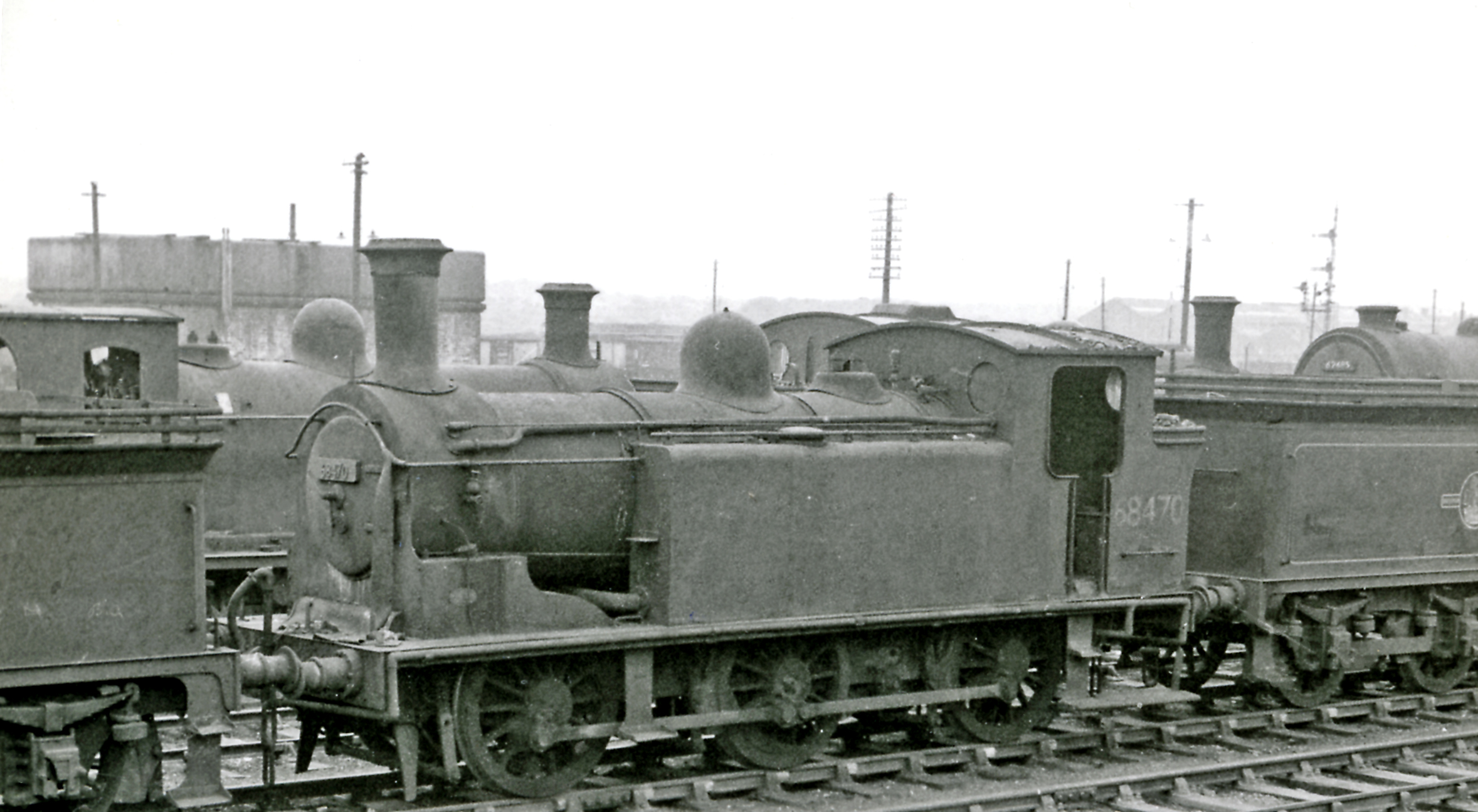
- Condemned No 68470 in a dump at Bathgate Locomotive Depot 19 September 1962
Type and origin
- Power type: Steam
- Designer: Matthew Holmes
- Builder: Neilson and Company, Sharp, Stewart and Company
- Build date: 1900-1901
- Total produced: 40
Specifications
- Configuration
  - Whyte: 0-6-0
- Gauge: 4 ft 8 1/2 in (1,435 mm)
- Driver dia.: 4 ft 6 in (1.372 m)
- Loco weight: 45 LT 5 cwt (46.0 t)
- Fuel type: Coal
- Boiler pressure: 150 lbf/in^{2} (1.03 MPa)
- Cylinders: Two, inside
- Cylinder size: 17 in × 26 in (432 mm × 660 mm)
- Valve gear: Stephenson
Performance figures
- Tractive effort: 17,745 lbf (78.93 kN)
Career
- Operators: North British Railway; London and North Eastern Railway; British Railways
- Axle load class: LNER/BR: Route availability 2
- Locale: North Eastern Region
- Withdrawn: 1947 (1), 1956-1962
- Disposition: All scrapped

The NBR D Class (LNER Class J83) was a class of 0-6-0 tank locomotives designed by Matthew Holmes for short distance freight, station pilot, and heavy shunting duties on the North British Railway.

== Service history ==
They were introduced in 1900 and had inside cylinders and piston valves operated by Stephenson valve gear. Forty of these new Class D engines were delivered in 1900–01, twenty each from Neilson and Company and Sharp, Stewart and Company. At grouping they became LNER class J83.

The class were highly successful in service, with only three failing to complete one million miles (1,600,000 km) during their lifetime. One locomotive, No. 9830, managed to complete two million miles (3,200,000 km).

The engines were commonly seen across the entire North British Railway network, and were the second largest class of tank engines on the railway, after the NBR A class.

== Numbering ==
On the NBR they were numbered in a sequence commencing with 795 (and are sometimes referenced as 795 class engines). A total of 40 locomotives were built, all but one of which came into British Railways (BR) ownership at nationalisation in 1948. BR numbers were 68442–68481.

== Withdrawal ==
One locomotive was withdrawn in 1947, a year before nationalisation, but later the class were gradually displaced by diesel shunters during the 1950s, with the last withdrawn and scrapped in 1962.

== Models ==
Hornby have produced a basic model in OO gauge since 1983, though in recent years it has been relegated into their junior RailRoad range.
