= Delta IV oil field =

Black Sea oil field

Delta IV
- Country: Romania
- Region: Black Sea
- Block: Histria
- Offshore/onshore: offshore
- Operator: Petrom

Field history
- Discovery: 2007
- Start of development: 2007
- Start of production: 2009

Production
- Current production of oil: 2,500 barrels per day (~1.2×10^{5} t/a)
- Current production of gas: 0.035×10^{6} m^{3}/d (1.2×10^{6} cu ft/d) 0.012×10^{9} m^{3}/a (0.42×10^{9} cu ft/a)
- Estimated oil in place: 4.1 million tonnes (~ 5×10^{6} m^{3} or 30 million bbl)
- Estimated gas in place: 420×10^{6} m^{3} 15×10^{9} cu ft

The Delta IV oil field is an oil field located on the continental shelf of the Black Sea. It was discovered in 2007 and developed by Petrom. It began production in 2009 and produces oil. The total proven reserves of the Delta IV oil field are around 30 million barrels (4.1 million tonnes), and production is centered on 2,500 barrels per day (400 m^{3}/d).
