= Ogwashi Ukwu =

Ogwashi-Ukwu
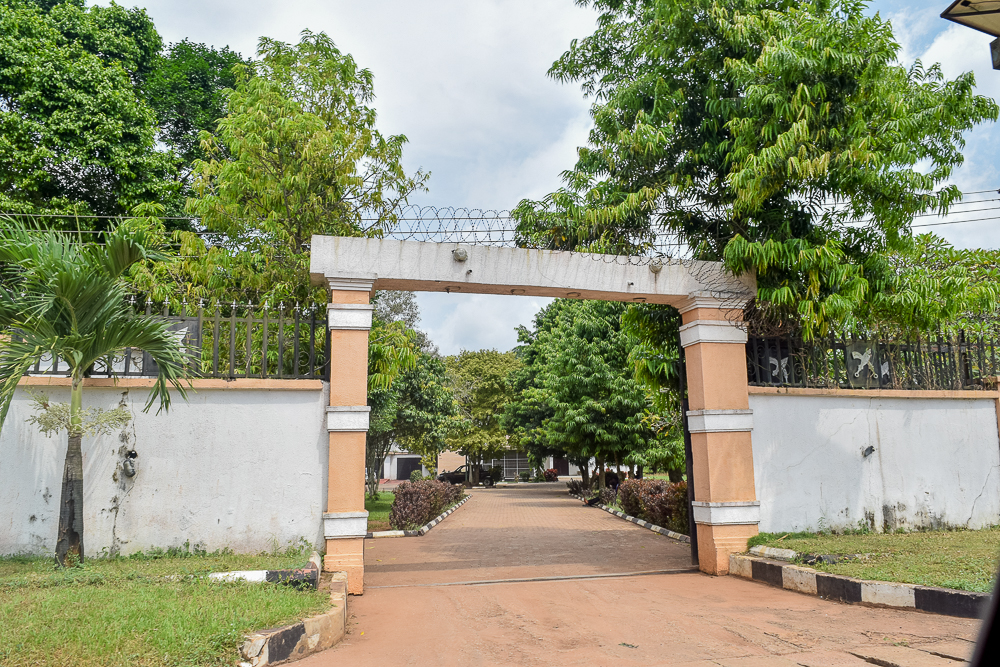

- Location within Nigeria
- Coordinates: 6°10′59.06″N 6°31′27.72″E
- Country: Nigeria
- State: Delta State

Government
  - Obi: Obi Ifechukwude Chukuka Okonjo 2nd

Population
  - Total: 200,234
- Time zone: UTC+1 (WAT)
- National language: Igbo

Ogwashi Ukwu, sometimes spelt as Ogwashi-Uku, is an Igbo town in Delta State, Nigeria. Located west of the state capital Asaba, it is the headquarters for the Local Government Area, Aniocha South. The population of Ogwashi-Ukwu is about 200,234.. However, its number has increased vastly and keeps increasing. It is an Anioma region of Delta State which is home to the Igbo-speaking people of Delta State. Its natives are the Enuani people, who are predominantly farmers and fishers..

Azungwu is located at the South Western part of Ogwashi-Ukwu. Azu-Ngwu means behind Ngwu Tree. Ngwu Tree (Osisi Ngwu) is a spiritual tree planted by Ochele Alio in the 11th century during the Establishment of Azungwu settlement. Azungwu quarter is made up of seven subcommunities or families: Umu-Ochele Alio, Umuzu, Umulogai, Idumu Ubulu Aliko, Idumu Odafe Isiokwe, Umu Ozoma Isiokwe and Ogbe Odogwu. Azungwu is a community of warriors and spirituality.

== Landmarks ==
- Jay Jay Okocha Stadium
- Ogwashi-Ukwu Post Office,
- Abu Ano Market at Ishekpe and
- Ogwashi-Ukwu Carnival (Ineh Festival)
- Kwale junction
- Ishiekpe Quarters - It had beautiful well-kept lawns and gardens maintained by prisoners under the watch of warders. There were many fruit trees: mango, guava, tangerine, orange and grapefruit which delighted the children and provided shade. Today Ogige is the site of Local Government Offices and it would benefit from landscaping and maintenance services. Although the fruit trees are gone it remains a green and leafy part of the town.

== Institutions ==
- Delta State Polytechnic
- St Mary's Hospital, P.O. Box 38, a hospital of the Roman Catholic Diocese of Issele-Uku
- Delta State Polytechnic Ogwashi-uku

== Notable people ==
Ogwashi-Ukwu has a number of prominent people either born in the town or elsewhere, who have contributed to the growth of the town or of Nigeria.

- Peter Konyegwachie, champion boxer and silver medalist, featherweight category in the 1984 Summer Olympics
- Jay-Jay Okocha , former international professional football player
- Ngozi Okonjo-Iweala, is a Nigerian-American economist and international development, expert. She sits on the boards of Standard Chartered Bank, Twitter, Global Alliance for Vaccines and Immunization, and the African Risk Capacity. On 15 February 2021, she was appointed as Director-General of the World Trade Organization
- Raph Uwechue, was a Nigerian minister, diplomat and publisher. He is a former president-general of the Ohanaeze Ndigbo, an Igbo socio-cultural organization in Nigeria

== Gallery ==
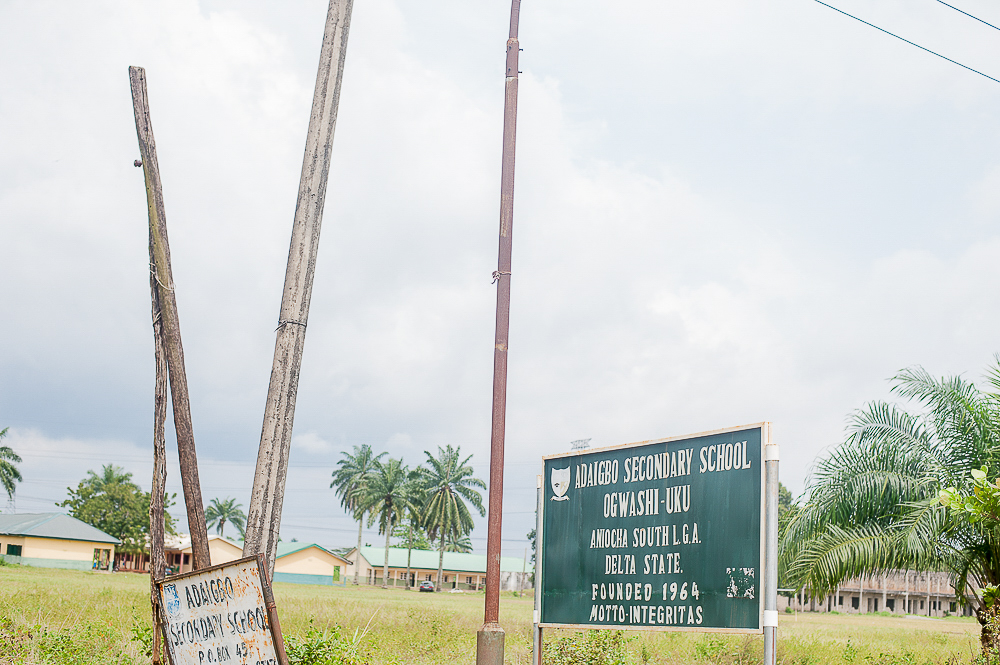

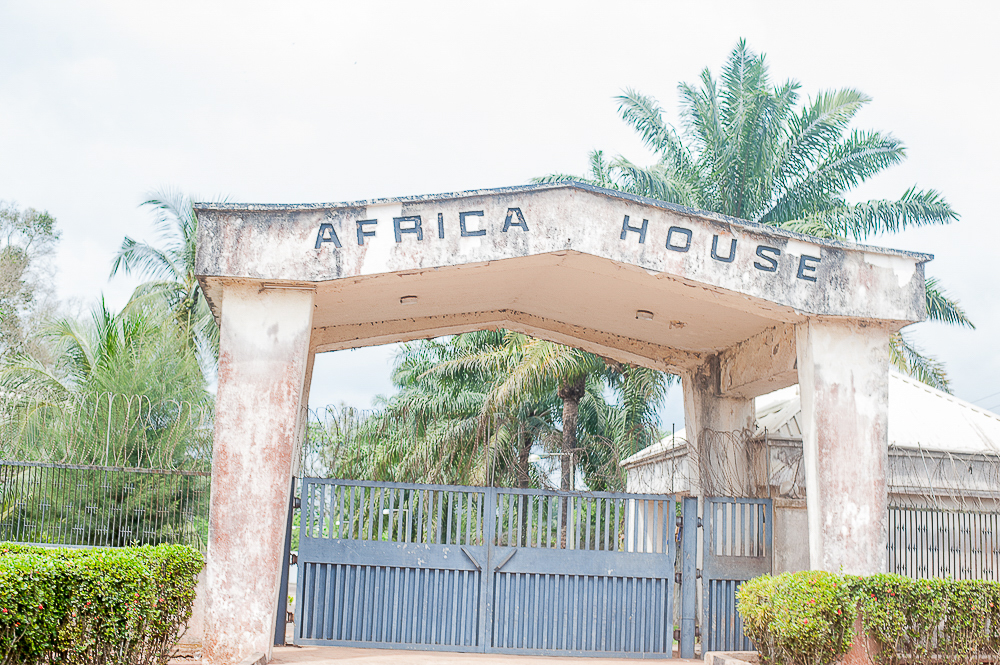

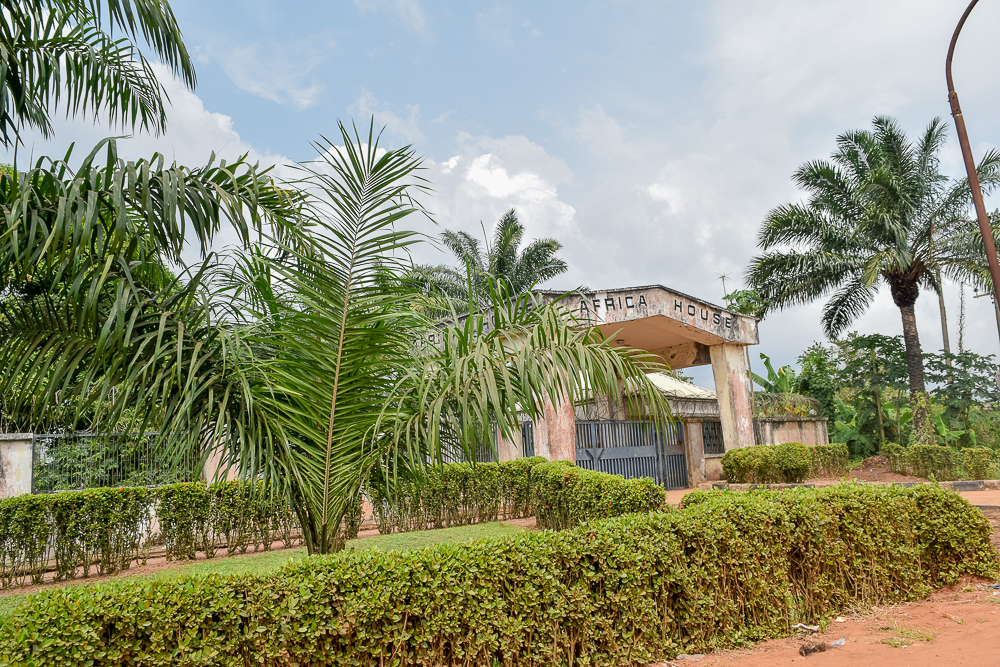

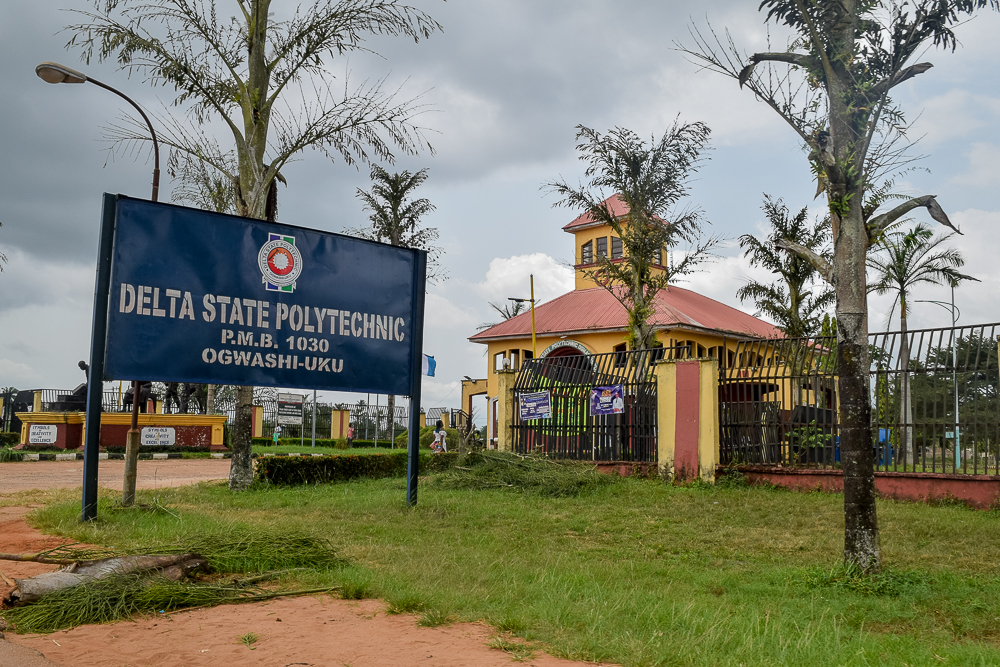

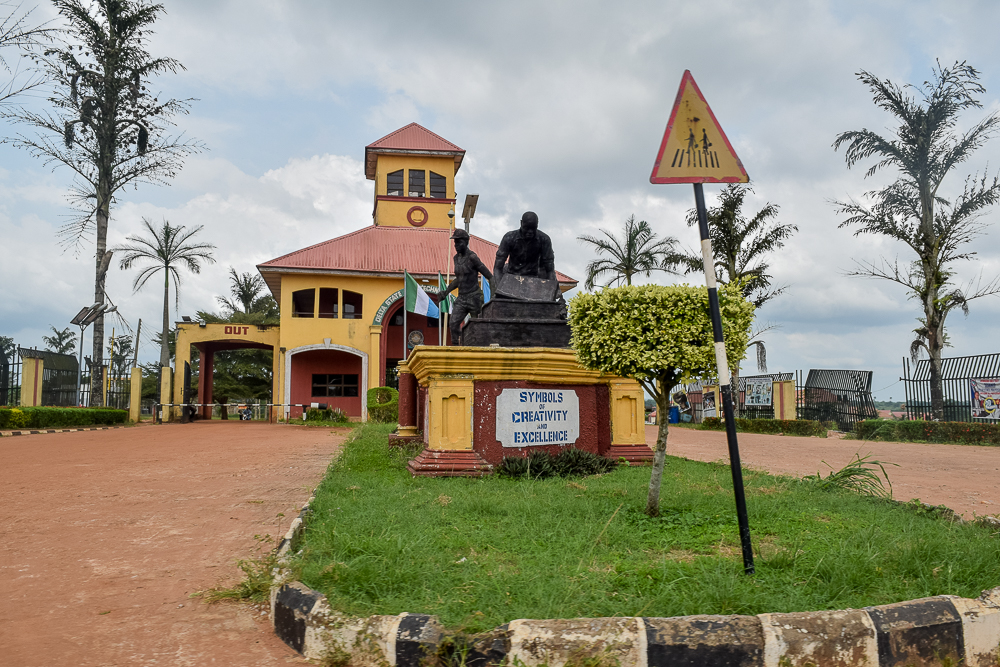

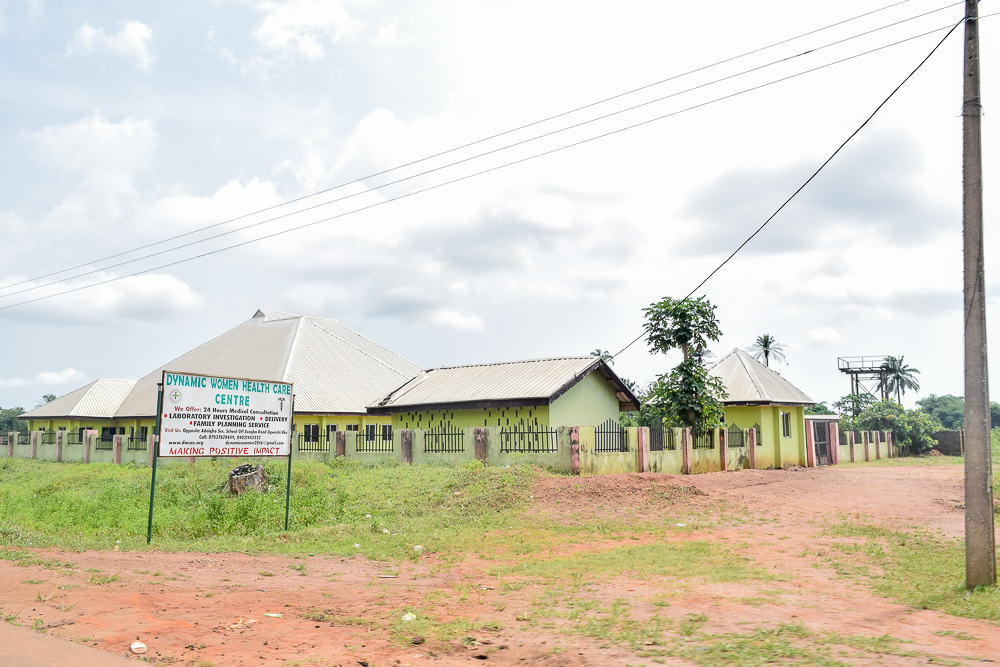

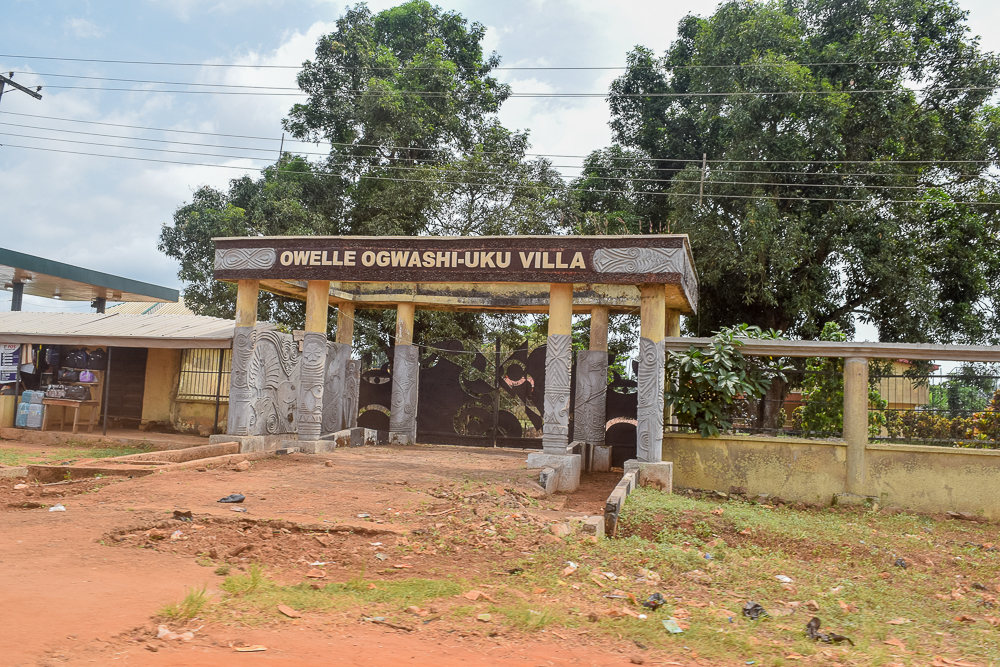

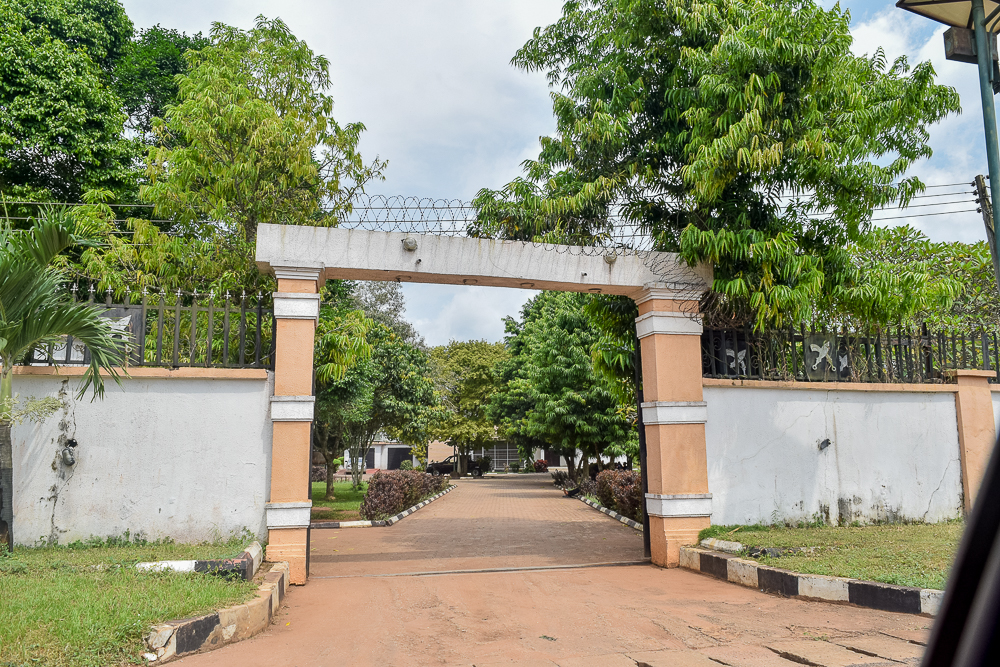

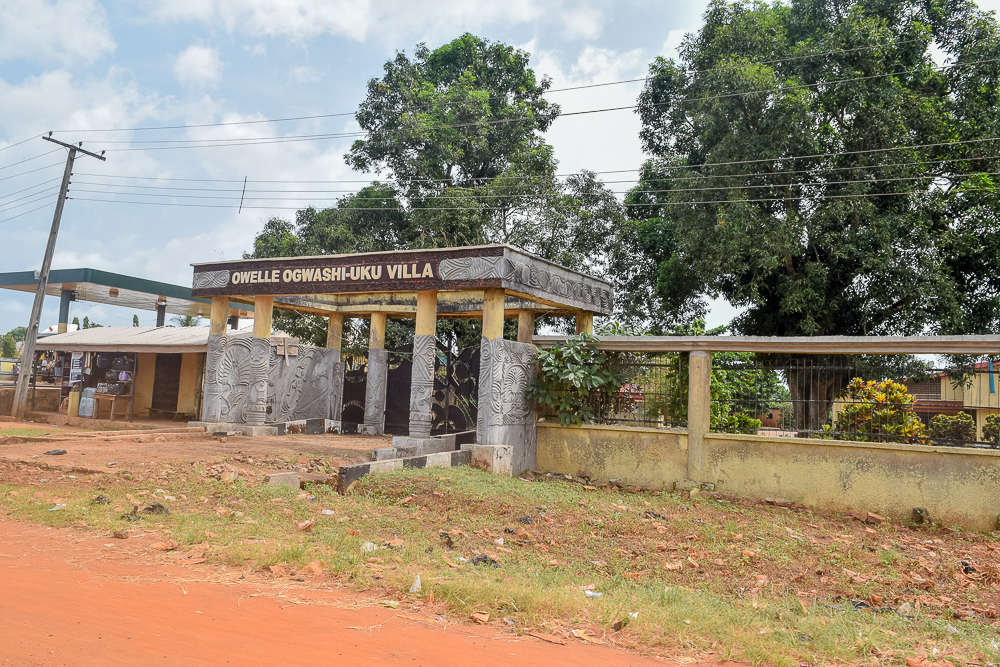

== See also ==
- Anioma people
- Enuani dialect
- Ekumeku Movement
