= Delta High School (Clarksburg, California) =

Location
- 52810 Netherlands Ave. Clarksburg, California 95612-0100; United States; 38.4162°N 121.5303°W

Information
- Type: Public high school
- School district: River Delta Unified School District
- Teaching staff: 11.40 (FTE)
- Grades: 9-12
- Enrollment: 183 (2023-2024)
- Student to teacher ratio: 16.05
- Colors: Black and gold
- Mascot: Saint
- Team name: Saints
- Rival: Rio Vista High School
- Information: (916) 744-1714
- Website: www.rdusd.org/schools/delta-high-school/index

Delta High School is a four-year public high school in Clarksburg, California, United States. It is part of the River Delta Unified School District. It is co-located in the same facility and shares a principal with Clarksburg Middle School. The combined enrollment for both schools is approximately 460 as of 2022.

== Academics ==
In 2009 Delta High was listed as a California Distinguished School. It has a GreatSchools rating of 7 out of 10.

== Athletics ==
Delta High School students participate in the California Interscholastic Federation Sac-Joaquin Section. They participate in Division V competition. The Saints field teams in most sports for both boys and girls.

== Notable alumni ==
- Charles Carroll "Tony" Eason, former football quarterback who played in the National Football League for the New England Patriots and New York Jets.
- Joanna "Cocktail" Hernandez, VH1's For the Love of Ray J winner
