= River Delta Unified School District =

School district in California, United States

Address
- 445 Montezuma Street Rio Vista, California, 94571; United States of America

District information
- Type: Public (government funded)
- Grades: K–12
- Superintendent: Katherine Wright
- Business administrator: Tammy Busch
- Schools: 13
- NCES District ID: 0633110

Students and staff
- Students: 1,874 (2020–2021)
- Teachers: 104.53 (FTE)
- Staff: 117.57 (FTE)
- Student–teacher ratio: 17.93:1

Other information
- Website: www.rdusd.org

The River Delta Unified School District is located in Sacramento County, California, United States. It extends into Solano and Yolo County.

== Schools ==
The district consists of the following schools:

Elementary Schools

- Bates-School
- Delta Elementary Charter School
- Isleton School
- Walnut Grove Elementary
- D.H. White Elementary

Middle School

- Clarksburg Middle School
- Riverview Middle School

High School

- Delta High School
- Mokelumne Continuation High School
- Rio Vista High School

Other

- River Delta High School/Elementary School (Independent Study)
- Wing River High School (Adult School)

== Governance ==
- Katherine Wright - Superintendent
- Alicia Fernandez - Board President
- Don Olson - Vice President
- Marilyn Riley - Clerk
- Rafaela Casillas - Member
- Dan Mahoney - Member
- Jennifer Stone - Member
- Chris Elliot - Member
