= D class Melbourne tram (1914) =

D-class
- Manufacturer: Duncan & Fraser
- Assembly: Adelaide
- Constructed: 1914
- Number built: 1
- Fleet numbers: 36
- Capacity: 56 as built, 48 as converted

Specifications
- Car length: 13.50 m (44 ft 3 in)
- Width: 2.62 m (8 ft 7 in)
- Height: 3.1 m (10 ft 2 in)
- Wheel diameter: 838 mm (33.0 in) (driving); 508 mm (20.0 in) (pony)
- Weight: 17.5 tonnes as built, 15.7 tonnes as converted
- Traction motors: 2 x 65 hp (48 kW) GE 201G
- Current collection: Trolley pole
- Bogies: Brush 22E
- Track gauge: 1,435 mm (4 ft 8 1/2 in)

Prahran & Malvern Tramways Trust (P&MTT) tram No.36 was one of a batch of ten Maximum Traction bogie cars built in 1914 by Duncan & Fraser, Adelaide. Although the lowest numbered of this group, it was the last to enter service, and was the first P&MTT tram to be equipped with 2 x 65 hp (48 kW) GE 201G motors. Subsequently, all other P&MTT Maximum Traction bogie cars were later retro-fitted with the same type of motors. The 22E Maximum Traction trucks were of JG Brill design, although manufactured by Brush in England.

In preparation for the proposed use of conductresses during World War I, No.36 was modified by enclosing some doorways and altering the seating layout to include a centre aisle the length of the tram. However, the use of conductresses did not eventuate at this time, indeed this did not occur in Melbourne until 1941. This was the only Melbourne tram so treated, and this modification later caused the Melbourne & Metropolitan Tramways Board (M&MTB) to classify this car as D-class (the other unmodified trams of this group being designated E-class).

Upon formation of the M&MTB on 2 February 1920, this tram retained its existing fleet number, as did all P&MTT trams, however the letter classification was not applied until after October 1921. By late 1923, all M&MTB drop-end-and-centre Maximum Traction trams were grouped together as C-class trams.

Air brakes were fitted in late 1920, to replace the original track and electrical braking. In the early 1920s it was rebuilt to its original form, and in 1929 the centre section was modified to resemble a W2-class tram, whilst at the same time it was painted green.

This tram was scrapped in 1940, but the body was not sold until 1945.
