= Class D =

The term Class D may refer to:

- Class D (baseball), a defunct class in minor league baseball in North America
- Class-D amplifier or switching amplifier
- Class D fire extinguisher
- Class D league, a classification of minor league baseball from 1902 to 1962
- Class D star, a stellar classification
- Class D, IP addresses on a classful network
- Class D, an airspace class as defined by the ICAO
- Class D, a type of Driver's license in the United States
- Class D, a North American broadcast station class
- Class-D, a type of character in the video game SCP – Containment Breach

== See also ==
- D class (disambiguation)
- D (disambiguation)
- Delta class (disambiguation)
