= WAGR ADH class =

Class of diesel railcars operated by the Western Australian Government Railways

- Manufacturer: Cravens
- Built at: Sheffield
- Entered service: 1955/56
- Number built: 4
- Fleet numbers: ADH651-ADG654
- Operator: Western Australian Government Railways

Specifications
- Prime movers: AEC 9.6 litre Mercedes-Benz from mid-1980s
- Track gauge: 1,067 mm (3 ft 6 in)

The WAGR ADH class was a four member class of diesel railcars operated by the Western Australian Government Railways.

== History ==
As part of an order for 18 ADG class railcars for Perth suburban services, an additional four were ordered from Cravens, Sheffield with different interiors for country work with the first three delivered in June 1955 and the fourth in 1956. When demand warranted, they operated with an ACL compartment car as a trailer.

They operated services from Perth to Miling, Wyalkatchem and Bunbury and from Geraldton to Cue.

Following the withdrawal of the services they operated, they were transferred to Perth to operate alongside the ADGs. They were refitted with similar interiors to the ADGs in 1962/63. In the mid-1980s, all were repowered with Mercedes-Benz engines.

== Sources ==
- Higham, Geoffrey (2007). Marble Bar to Mandurah: A History of Passenger Rail Services in Western Australia (1st ed.). Bassendean: Rail Heritage WA. ISBN 978-0-9803922-0-3. OCLC 271545712. Wikidata Q140375689.
