= WAGR D class (1884) =

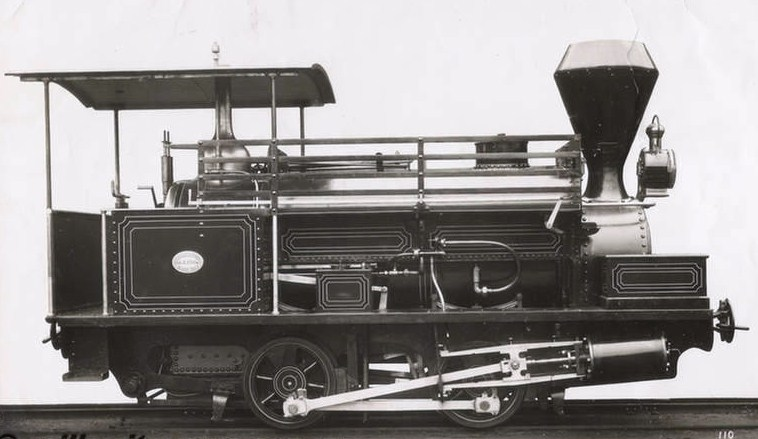
- Builder's photograph of D6
Type and origin
- Power type: Steam
- Builder: Hunslet Engine Company
- Serial number: 331
- Build date: 1884
- Total produced: 1
Specifications
- Configuration
  - Whyte: 0-4-0ST
- Gauge: 3 ft 6 in (1,067 mm)
- Fuel type: Coal
- Fuel capacity: 0.6 long tons 0 cwt (1,300 lb or 0.6 t)
- Water cap.: 250 imp gal (1,100 L; 300 US gal)
- Firebox
  - Grate area: 5 sq ft (0.46 m^{2})
- Boiler pressure: 120 psi (827 kPa)
Performance figures
- Tractive effort: 3,888 lbf (17.29 kN)
- Factor of adh.: 7.1
Career
- Operators: Western Australian Government Railways
- Numbers: D6
- First run: 1 March 1884
- Retired: 1951
- Disposition: scrapped

The WAGR D class was a single member class of 0-4-0ST tank locomotive operated by the Western Australian Government Railways (WAGR) from 1884 until 1903.

== History ==
The D class locomotive was built in 1884 by Hunslet Engine Company, Leeds. It entered service on 1 March 1884 as a jetty shunter on the Fremantle Long Jetty. When engine class designations were introduced in 1885, it was numbered D6.

Upon the opening of Fremantle's inner harbour in 1897, the long jetty ceased to be used, and the locomotive became surplus to requirements. It was sold in September 1903 for use on the 2.5 mile Leonora tramway. Following the electrification of that tramway in 1908, it was sold to Bunning Brothers, reboilered, had its saddle tank removed and a tender built hauled timber hauling times trains at Lyalls Mill, Argyle, Muja and Tullis until withdrawn in 1951 and scrapped in 1956.

== Namesakes ==
The D class designation was reused for the D class locomotives from 1912 and again in the 1970s when the D class diesel locomotives entered service.

== See also ==
- History of rail transport in Western Australia
- List of Western Australian locomotive classes
