= Ika people =

Ethnicity in Delta State, Nigeria

Ṇ́dị́ ị̀ká

Total population
- 240,000–560,000

Regions with significant populations
- Delta State and Edo State, Nigeria

Languages
- Ika, English, Nigerian Pidgin

Religion
- Christianity, traditional religion

Related ethnic groups
- Anioma people, Igbo people, other western Igboid groups

The Ika people (Ika-Igbo: Ṇ́dị́ ị̀ká) are part of the Anioma group, found primarily in the northwest of Delta State and parts of Edo State, Nigeria. They speak Ika, an Igboid language belonging to the Nuclear Igboid branch of the Niger-Congo language family. The Ika form one of the four groups alongside Aniocha, Oshimili, and Ukwuani that make up the western Igbo communities of Delta State, collectively known as the Anioma. The word Anioma is an acronym coined in 1951 by Chief Dennis Osadebay, derived from the initial letters of Aniocha, Ndokwa, Ika, and Oshimili.

== Geography ==
The Ika occupy two local government areas in Delta State: Ika South and Ika North East. Major towns in Ika South include Agbor, Abavo, and surrounding communities. Major towns in Ika North East include Owa, Umunede, Akumazi, and Igbodo. Ika-speaking communities also exist in Edo State, including Igbanke and surrounding areas of Orhionmwon LGA.

Agbor, the largest Ika town with a population of approximately 367,000, serves as the commercial and cultural hub of Ika South. Geographically, Ika speakers border Edo speakers to the west, Ishan speakers to the north, Aniocha speakers to the east, and Ukwuani speakers to the south.

== Language ==
The Ika language belongs to the Nuclear Igboid branch of the Niger-Congo language family. Uguru (2015), writing in the Journal of the International Phonetic Association (Cambridge University Press), states in her opening sentence: "Ika is a dialect of the Igbo language spoken in Ika South and Ika North East Local Government Areas of Delta State and the Igbanke area of Edo State in Nigeria. It belongs to the Niger Igbo cluster of dialects (Ikekeonwu 1986) spoken in areas bordering the west of the River Niger."

Williamson (1968), in the earliest systematic study of the language, described Ika as a dialect of Igbo, noting it is treated as a separate variety "on purely linguistic grounds" due to distinct phonological features including nasal vowels and two additional consonants (/ʃ/ and /ʒ/) absent from Standard Igbo. Ika has since been assigned its own ISO language code (ISO 639-3: ikk).

Onyeche (2002), in a sociolinguistic study of the Ika community, compared the Ika language structure directly to Igbo, writing that "the Ika language is regarded as a cluster of dialects (Williamson 1968). This is similar to the Igbo language which is also a cluster of dialects." The same study concluded that "in spite of being surrounded by languages such as Ishan, Edo, Ukwuani and Aniocha, the Ika linguistic situation in the Ika community has not been significantly affected by them."

Forde and Jones (1967) classified Ika as part of the western Igbo group alongside Aniocha, Oshimili, and Ukwuani. Blench (2019) lists Ika under the Igboid languages in the Atlas of Nigerian Languages.

A 2022 peer-reviewed study in African Identities journal concluded that although external influences entered the Anioma area over time, "such had been absorbed linguistically over time, the innovations they came with reinterpreted completely in the climate of the aboriginal Igbo culture."

The Ika language is a cluster of closely related dialects. Onyeche (2002) classified Ika dialects into four broad groups: South (Agbor clan), South-South (Abavo clan), North-South (Owa, Mbiri, Ute-Okpu, Ute-Ogbeje, Otolokpo, Idumuesah), and North-East (Akumazi, Umunede, Igbodo). Three communities within the Ika area — Ozara, Alisor, and Alilehan — speak Ozara, a distinct Edoid language variety, but are culturally and politically considered Ika.

== History and origins ==
The Ika people occupy a historical crossroads of Igbo, Benin, Esan, and other regional influences. Their communities developed through centuries of migration, cultural interaction, and political change. The eleven clans that make up the Ika community have varied oral traditions and migration histories.

Scholars generally classify the Ika as part of the Igboid family and a subgroup of the broader Igbo-speaking peoples of Nigeria. A 2022 peer-reviewed study in African Identities journal noted that while the popular narrative regards the Anioma area as Benin kingdom territory, this narrative "has been amplified to the extent that their past is distorted." The study found that although external influences entered the Anioma area, these were absorbed and reinterpreted within the framework of the aboriginal Igbo culture.

Elizabeth Isichei, in her 1976 work A History of the Igbo People, discussed the western Igbo communities including the Ika area as part of the broader Igbo historical tradition. Anthropologist M.A. Onwuejeogwu proposed that Nri influence expanded westward across parts of the western Niger region between the 12th and 18th centuries, contributing to the cultural development of settlements in the present Ika area.

=== Formation of Ika identity ===
Historically, the Ika existed as autonomous towns and villages, including Agbor, Owa, Abavo, and Umunede, each maintaining independent political and cultural systems. Although these communities shared linguistic and cultural similarities, they did not originally identify collectively as "Ika."

The emergence of a unified Ika ethnic identity accelerated during the British colonial period. Colonial administrators grouped the Ika-speaking communities together for administrative convenience, particularly after Captain M.O.S. Crewe Read established Agbor as headquarters of the Agbor District in 1901. The term "Ika" gained official recognition in 1945 with the renaming of the Agbor District Council to the Ika District Council, followed by the establishment of the Ika Federal Native Authority in 1952.

British administrative documents from the colonial period consistently referred to Ika communities within the broader Igbo grouping. Reports by Marshall (1936), Whiting (1936), Simpson (1936), Denton (1937), and Stanfield (1936) all describe the present Ika people as Ika-speaking communities within the Igbo group.

The Ekumeku Movement, an armed resistance to British colonial expansion in the late 19th and early 20th centuries, drew significant participation from Ika communities alongside other western Igbo groups.

== Traditional governance ==
Ika communities are governed through traditional monarchies headed by an Obi (king). The Dein of Agbor is among the most prominent traditional rulers in the Ika area. Traditional governance also involves councils of titled elders, age grades, and community assemblies that handle social regulation, dispute resolution, and the organisation of communal events. The age-grade system (otu ogbo) is a central institution in Ika social life.

== Culture and traditions ==
Ika culture shares broad features with the wider Igbo cultural tradition, including the practice of odinani (traditional religion), the celebration of the New Yam Festival, masquerade traditions (mmanwu), and a strong oral tradition of proverbs, storytelling, and communal music.

The Ogwa Ika festival is an annual cultural celebration bringing together Ika communities across Delta State. Marriage customs follow Igbo traditions, with the bridal wine-carrying ceremony (igbankwu nwanyi) a central feature of traditional Ika weddings. In Delta State, the Ika community has been described as the "food basket" of the state due to their farming prowess, particularly in the production of yam and cassava.

== Notable people ==
- Jim Ovia: Businessman, founder of Zenith Bank
- Godwin Emefiele: Governor, Central Bank of Nigeria (2015–2023)
- Lucky Irabor: Former Chief of Defence Staff, Nigeria
- Ifeanyi Okowa: Delta State Governor (2015–2023)
- Dumebi Iyamah: Founder of Andrea Iyamah international fashion brand
- Somkele Iyamah: Actress, model, director and producer
- Sam Obi: Former Acting Governor and Speaker, Delta State House of Assembly
- Nduka Obaigbena: Chairman and Editor-in-Chief, THISDAY Media Group and ARISE News Channel
- Hanks Anuku: Nollywood actor

== See also ==
- Anioma people
- Igbo people
- Igboid languages
- Ika language (Nigeria)
- Delta State
- Ekumeku Movement
