= List of University of Oxford alumni by academic discipline =

This is a very incomplete list of alumni of the University of Oxford by the academic discipline of their degree(s). As they have a degree (not an honorary degree) from the University of Oxford, they were all members of one (or more) of the colleges of the University: some people multiple times, under different discipline headings.

This list forms part of a series of lists of people associated with the University of Oxford; for other lists, please see the main article List of University of Oxford people.

== Classics ==
- A. V. Dicey (Balliol)
- H. L. A. Hart (New College)
- C. A. R. Hoare (Merton)
- Richard Searby (Corpus Christi)
- Travers Twiss (University)

== Chemistry ==
- E. J. Bowen (Balliol)
- Humphry Bowen (Magdalen)

== Economics ==
- Ann Olivarius (Somerville)

== English ==
- Denham Sutcliffe (Hertford)
- Gordon Keith Chalmers (Wadham)
- John Crowe Ransom (Christ Church)
- Roberta Teale Swartz

== Engineering Science ==
- Rowan Atkinson (Queen's)
- Jonathan Bowen (University)

== History ==
- Charles Arnold-Baker (Magdalen)
- John Hattendorf (Pembroke, St Antony’s)
- Paul Kennedy (St Antony’s)
- Wm. Roger Louis (St. Antony’s)
- G. C. Peden (Brasenose)
- Charles Ritcheson (St Edmund Hall)
- William Searle Holdsworth (New College)
- Harold Laski (New College)
- Þór Whitehead (Pembroke)

== Law ==
- Nicholas Allard
- Andrew Ashworth (Worcester and All Souls)
- John Behan (Hertford and University)
- Francis Bennion (Balliol)
- Peter Birks (Trinity, Brasenose)
- William Blackstone (Pembroke)
- Ruth Chang (Balliol)
- Paul-André Crépeau
- Giuseppina d'Agostino
- Ruth Deech, Baroness Deech (St Anne's)
- Ronald Dworkin (Magdalen)
- John Eekelaar (University)
- Richard Epstein (Oriel)
- Malcolm Evans (Regent's Park)
- John Finnis (University)
- Owen M. Fiss
- John Gardner (New College)
- Stephen Hetherington (New College)
- William Searle Holdsworth (New College)
- Tony Honoré (New College)
- Anne M. Lofaso (Somerville)
- Neil MacCormick (Balliol)
- Michael Mandel
- Peter North (Jesus)
- Fidelis Oditah (Magdalen)
- Stephen R. Perry
- Arthur Richard Andrew Scace
- Theodore Tylor (Balliol)
- Alison Young (Hertford)

== Mathematics ==
- Bill Roscoe (University)
- Travers Twiss (University)

== Oriental Studies ==
- Noah Feldman (Christ Church)

== Philosophy ==
- Leslie Green (Nuffield)
- Joseph Raz (Balliol)

== Physics ==
- Tim Berners-Lee (Queen's)

== Politics ==
- Elena Kagan (Worcester)

== Politics, Philosophy and Economics ==
- Cara H. Drinan
- Amy Wax (Somerville)
- Marius Ostrowski (Magdalen and All Souls)
