= List of University of Oxford academics by academic discipline =

This is a list of academics of the University of Oxford by the academic disciplines. Many were also fellows and/or tutors at the colleges of the University. Some people multiple times, under different discipline headings.

This list forms part of a series of lists of people associated with the University of Oxford; for other lists, please see the main article List of University of Oxford people.

== Law ==
- William Reynell Anson (All Souls)
- Andrew Ashworth (All Souls)
- John Behan (University)
- Francis Bennion
- Peter Birks (All Souls)
- William Blackstone (All Souls, New Inn Hall) first Vinerian Professor of English Law
- Ruth Chang (University)
- Ruth Deech, Baroness Deech (St Anne's)
- A. V. Dicey (Trinity)
- Ronald Dworkin (University)
- John Eekelaar (Pembroke)
- John Finnis (University)
- Mark Freedland (St John's)
- John Gardner (All Souls, Brasenose)
- Leslie Green (Lincoln, Balliol)
- H. L. A. Hart (University, Brasenose)
- William Searle Holdsworth (St John's)
- Tony Honoré (Queen's, New, All Souls)
- Anne M. Lofaso (St Hugh's, Wadham)
- Neil MacCormick (Balliol)
- Basil Markesinis (Lady Margaret Hall, Brasenose)
- Peter North (Jesus)
- Fidelis Oditah (Merton)
- Joseph Raz (Balliol)
- Travers Twiss (University)
- Theodore Tylor (Balliol)
- Alison Young (Balliol and Hertford)

== Philosophy ==
- H. L. A. Hart (New)
