= Ika =

Ika may refer to:

- Ika, Akwa Ibom, a Local Government Area in Nigeria
- Ika, Croatia, a town in Primorje-Gorski Kotar County, Croatia
- Ika language (Colombia), also known as Arhuaco
- Ika language (Nigeria)
- Ika people, of Nigeria
- Ika people (Colombia)
- Enrique Ika (c. 1859–after 1900), king of Easter Island
- Siaki Ika (born 2000), American football player
- Timothy Ika, Nauruan politician
- Tehran Imam Khomeini International Airport, Tehran, Iran
- Ika Musume, the main character from the Japanese manga Squid Girl

== See also ==
- IKA (disambiguation)
- ICA (disambiguation)
