= Agbor =

Town in Delta State, Nigeria

- City
- Interactive map of Agbor
- Country: Nigeria
- Zone: South South
- State: Delta State
- Local government area: Ika South
- Seat: Traditional

Government
  - Dein: Ikenchuku Keagborekuzi
- Time zone: UTC+1 (WAT)
- Postcode: 321...
- Area code: 055

Agbor is the most populous town of approximately 367,000 among the Ika people, in Delta State, Nigeria. It is located in Ika South Local Government Area of Delta State, in South-south geo-political zone of Nigeria, West Africa. Agbor is the headquarters of Ika South Local Government Area, in Delta State, Nigeria.

Renovations on the University of Delta (previously known as college of Education) in 2021 has led to Agbor being classified as a college town.

== Towns ==
- Agbamuse/Oruru
- Agbor-nta
- Aliagwai
- Alifekede
- Alihagwu
- Alihame
- Alileha
- Aliokpu
- Alisimie
- Alizomor
- Boji-Boji Agbor
- Ekuku-Agbor
- Emuhun
- Ewuru
- Idumu-Oza
- Ihaikpen
- Ihogbe
- Obiolihe
- Ogbease
- Ogbeisere
- Ogbeisogban
- Ogbemudein
- Oki
- Omumu

The Aladja-Itakpe-Ajaokuta rail crosses through the city of Agbor to the terminal at Owa to two steel hubs of Nigeria (Aladja and Ajaokuta)

== Education ==
Agbor is home to several educational institutions, including University of Delta.

== Notable people ==
- Hanks Anuku - Nigerian actor
- Godwin Ifeanyi Emefiele - Former Governor of the Central Bank of Nigeria
- Lucky Irabor - Former Chief of Defense staff of Nigeria and Retired Nigerian Army General.
- Nduka Obaigbena - Media entrepreneur and founder of This Day newspaper and Arise News.
- Sam Obi - Former Acting Governor of Delta State and Former Speaker, Delta State House of Assembly.
- Ifeanyi Okowa - Nigerian Politician
- Sunday Oliseh - Nigerian football manager
- Jim Ovia - Nigeria Business Man
- Igho Sanomi, Nigerian Oil tycoon.
