= IKA =

IKA may refer to

- IATA code and common English abbreviation of Tehran Imam Khomeini International Airport
- Industrias Kaiser Argentina, former Argentine motor company
- Informativna katolička agencija, a Croatian Catholic news agency
- Internationale Kochkunst Ausstellung (IKA), the International Exhibition of Culinary Art or Culinary Olympics
- Imperial Klans of America, Knights of the Ku Klux Klan, a white supremacist organization
- Social Insurance Institute (IKA), state-run social security organisation in Greece
- International Karate Association
- International Kiteboarding Association

== See also ==
- Ika (disambiguation)
