= Healthcare in Greece =

Logo of the Ministry for Health and Social Solidarity.

Healthcare in Greece consists of a universal health care system provided through national health insurance, and private health care. According to the 2011 budget, the Greek healthcare system was allocated 6.1 billion euro, or 2.8% of GDP. In a 2000 report by the World Health Organization, the Greek healthcare system was ranked 14th worldwide in the overall assessment, above other countries such as Germany (25) and the United Kingdom (18), while ranking 11th at level of service.

Healthcare in Greece is provided by the National Healthcare Service (ESY) (Greek: Εθνικό Σύστημα Υγείας, ΕΣΥ) (or National Health System, ESY).

== Classical Greece ==
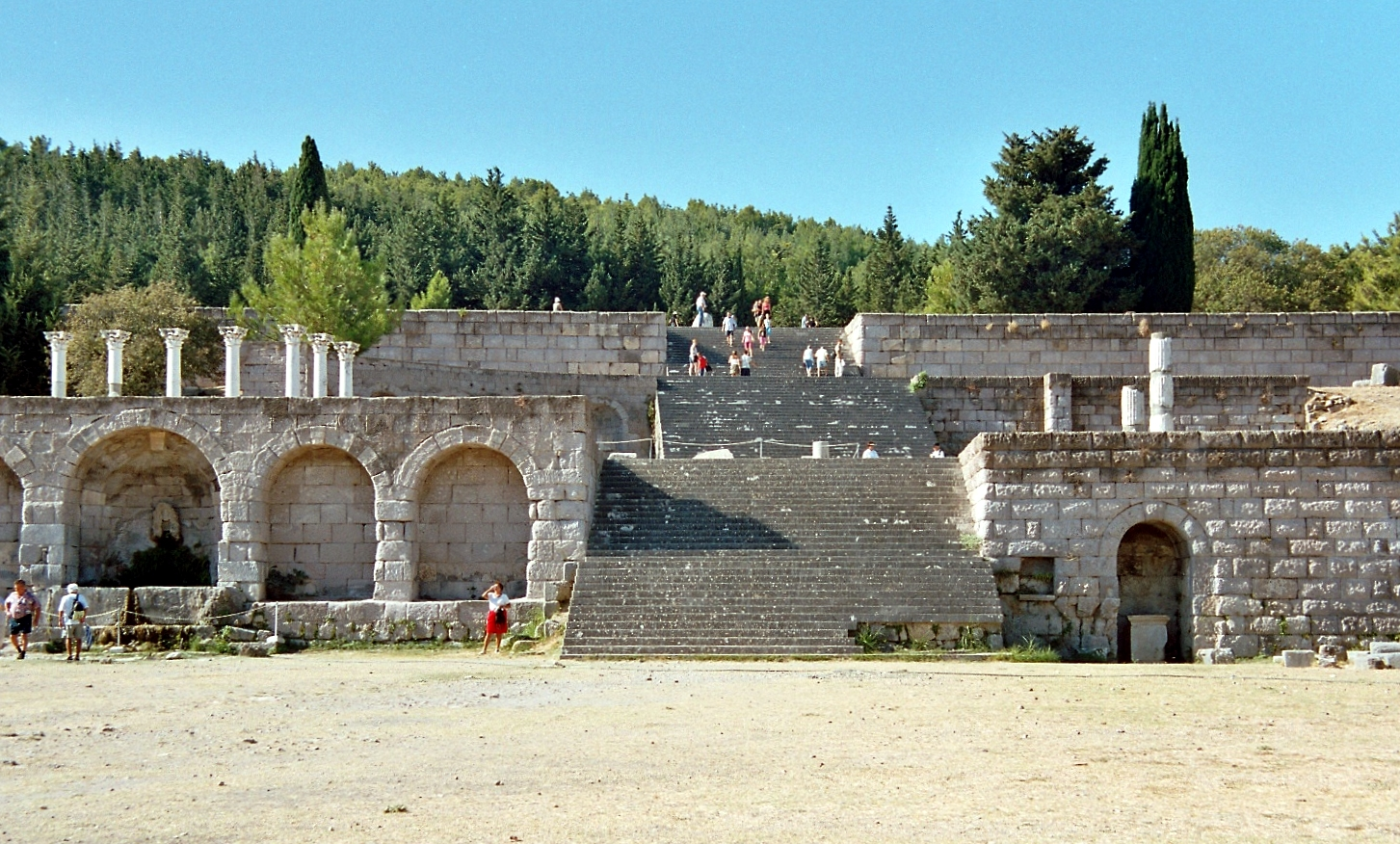
The Asclepieion of the island of Kos.

Healthcare in Greece traces its roots to the ancient Greek civilization. Hospitals did not exist in the modern sense in the ancient Greek world, but temples dedicated to the healing god Aesclepius (called Asclepieia) functioned as healing places as well as places of worship. It is not known whether or not cities in ancient Greece provided free healthcare to their citizens, but recent study of the ruins of the Kos Asclepieion show that medical services were offered to everyone who could pay for them, including slaves and foreigners.

== Medieval Greece ==
The Byzantine Empire is accredited by some for having invented the hospital as the institution we know it to be today. Professor Timothy S. Miller of the Johns Hopkins University argues that the Byzantine Empire was the first to employ a system of hospital-based healthcare, where the hospital became the chief institution of the medical profession in contrast to its function as a last resort in Western medieval Europe, carrying forward the medical knowledge of ancient Greece and Rome.

== Modern Greek State ==
In 1833, the nomíatros "forensic doctor" position was established, with the current responsibilities of a lawyer and a coroner. A year later the Medical Conference was established, a secretariat of the Ministry of the Interior which functioned as an advisory body. In 1836 the first hospital was founded. The first public insurance fund, the Navy Defense Fund began operating in 1861. The same year the Pension Fund for Public Servants was established, while the following year the Law PSMB΄ (1862) "On the Establishment of Madhouses" was published.

In the pre-war period, the government of Eleftherios Venizelos from 1910 to 1915 reformed the country's health system, such as Law 3934 of 1911 which obliges employers to provide health insurance to employees, Law 281 of 1914 which established the maternity leave and enabled the establishment of mutual aid funds, and Law 551 of 1915 which mandates compensation for occupational injuries. In 1922, the Ministry of Health and Welfare was established. A year later the country was divided into five Health Districts and a Health Board was established for each prefecture. In 1925 the institution of People's Clinics was introduced. On the basis of Law 6298 of 1934, the Social Insurance Institute (Greek: Ίδρυμα Κοινωνικών Ασφαλίσεων, IKA) was established, which started operating in 1937. With the Compulsory Law 965 of 1937 the country's nursing institutions took the form of Legal Person of Public Law (NPDD).

During the post-war period, the decentralization of the system was established with Law 2592 of 1953, all health units came under the Ministry of Social Welfare and the proportional distribution of hospital beds was attempted. Law 1316 of 1983 established the National Organization for Medicines (Greek: Εθνικός Οργανισμός Φαρμάκων, EOF), the National Pharmaceutical Industry and the State Pharmacy.

The "National Health System" was unified following Law 1397 in 1983 and the "Health Centers" were created. Until then, eighty health insurance funds were operating with 6 beds/1000 inhabitants and 103 health workers/100,000 inhabitants.

In 2001, with Law 2889/2001, sixteen Health Regions were established under the PESY (Regional Health System). In 2005, with Law 3329/2005, they were merged into seven.

== Austerity period ==
In July 2011, changes were made to the Greek healthcare system in accordance with austerity measures. Unemployed Greeks were entitled to healthcare from national health insurance for a maximum of a year, and after that period, healthcare was no longer universal and patients had to pay for their own treatment. Austerity measures also resulted in citizens being forced to contribute more towards the cost of their medications. As a result, many free clinics funded by private donations sprang up, and although officially illegal, were allowed to remain in operation.

Public health spending fell by 25.2% between 2009 and 2012, dropping from 2.25% to 1.53% of gross domestic product for medicines. At the same time, unemployment (27.3% in 2013) created around 2 million uninsured people, leading to the establishment of an emergency “health voucher” program. The health consequences are significant, with a 45% increase in suicides between 2007 and 2011, a drastic increase in HIV infections among injecting drug users, and a deterioration in maternal and child health indicators.

In 2016, the Greek government voted to extend health coverage to uninsured people who are registered as unemployed and refugees from June 1 on, with those earning less than 2,400 euro a year entitled to free healthcare, with the threshold rising for families according to how many children they have.

== Hospitals ==
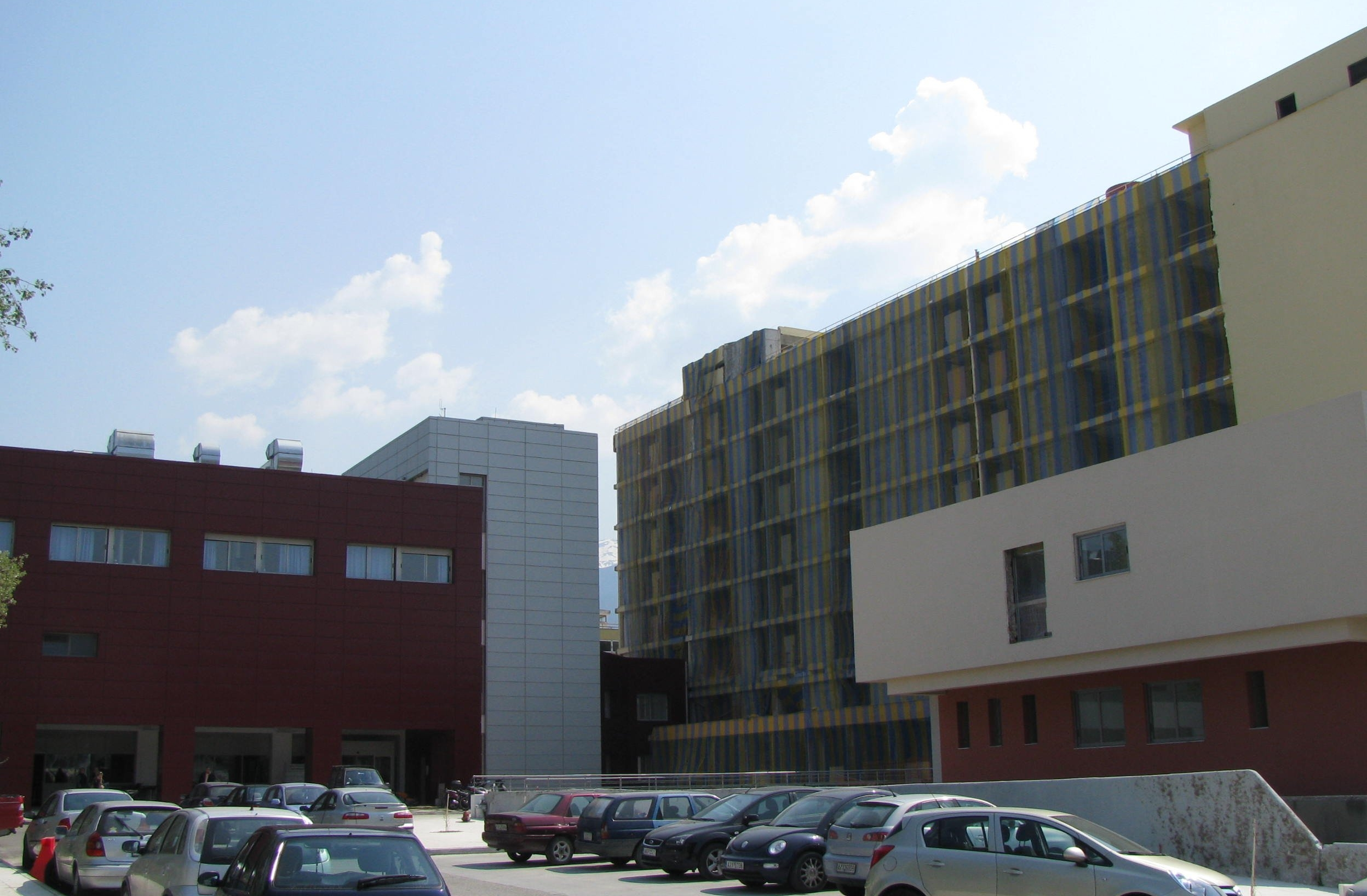
Agios Andreas Hospital, Patras

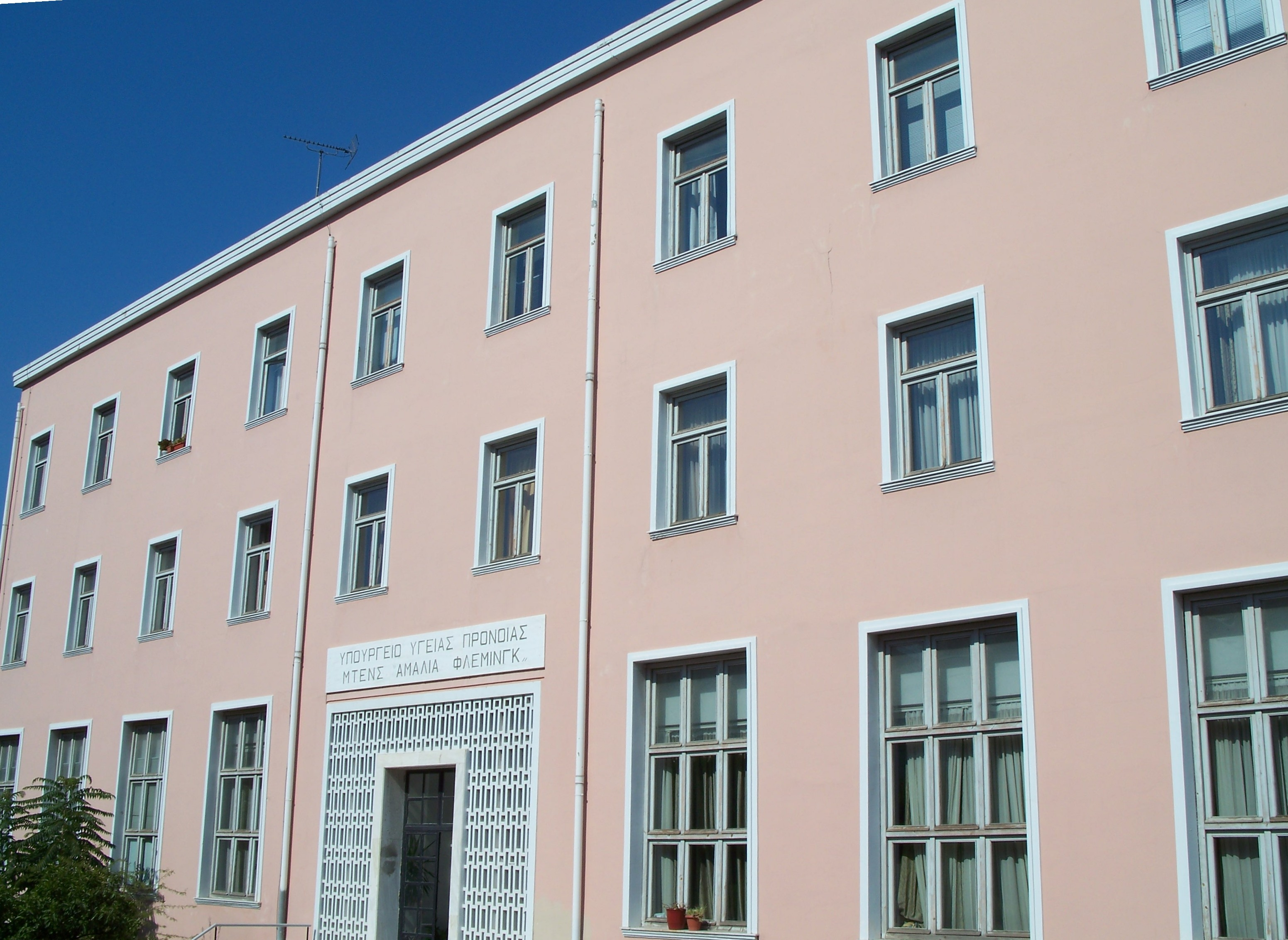
Amalia Fleming Hospital, Athens

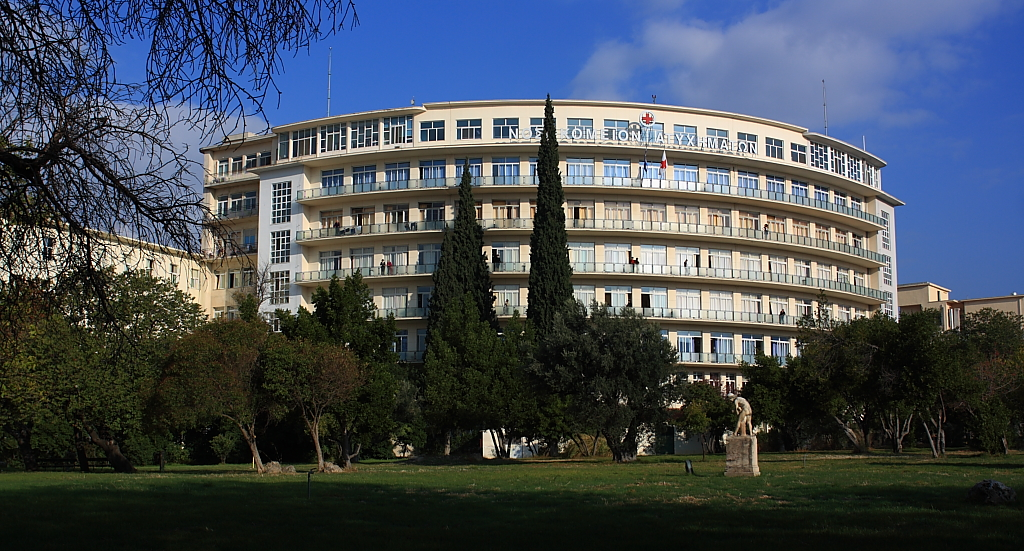
KAT Hospital

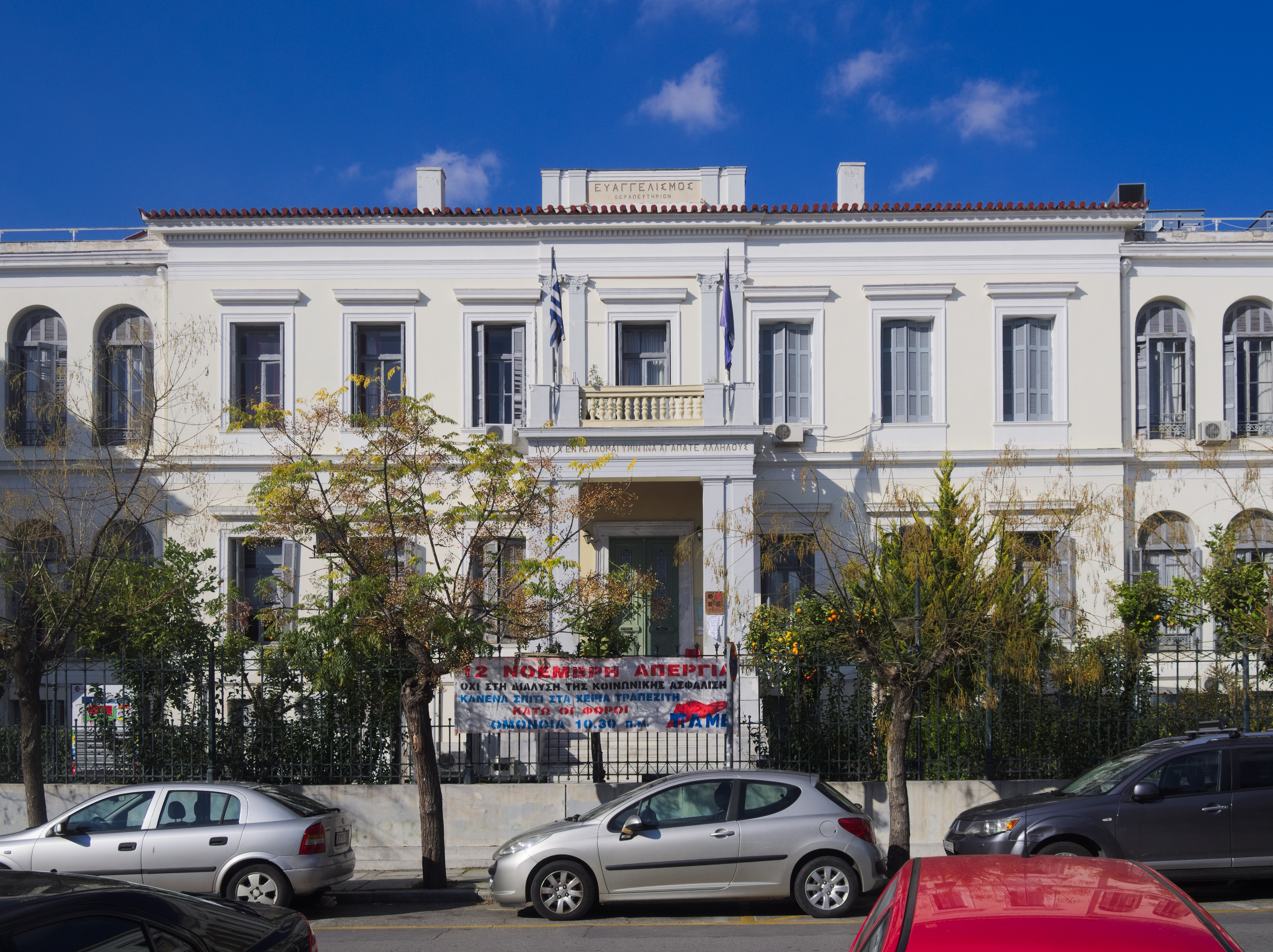
Evangelismos Hospital, Athens

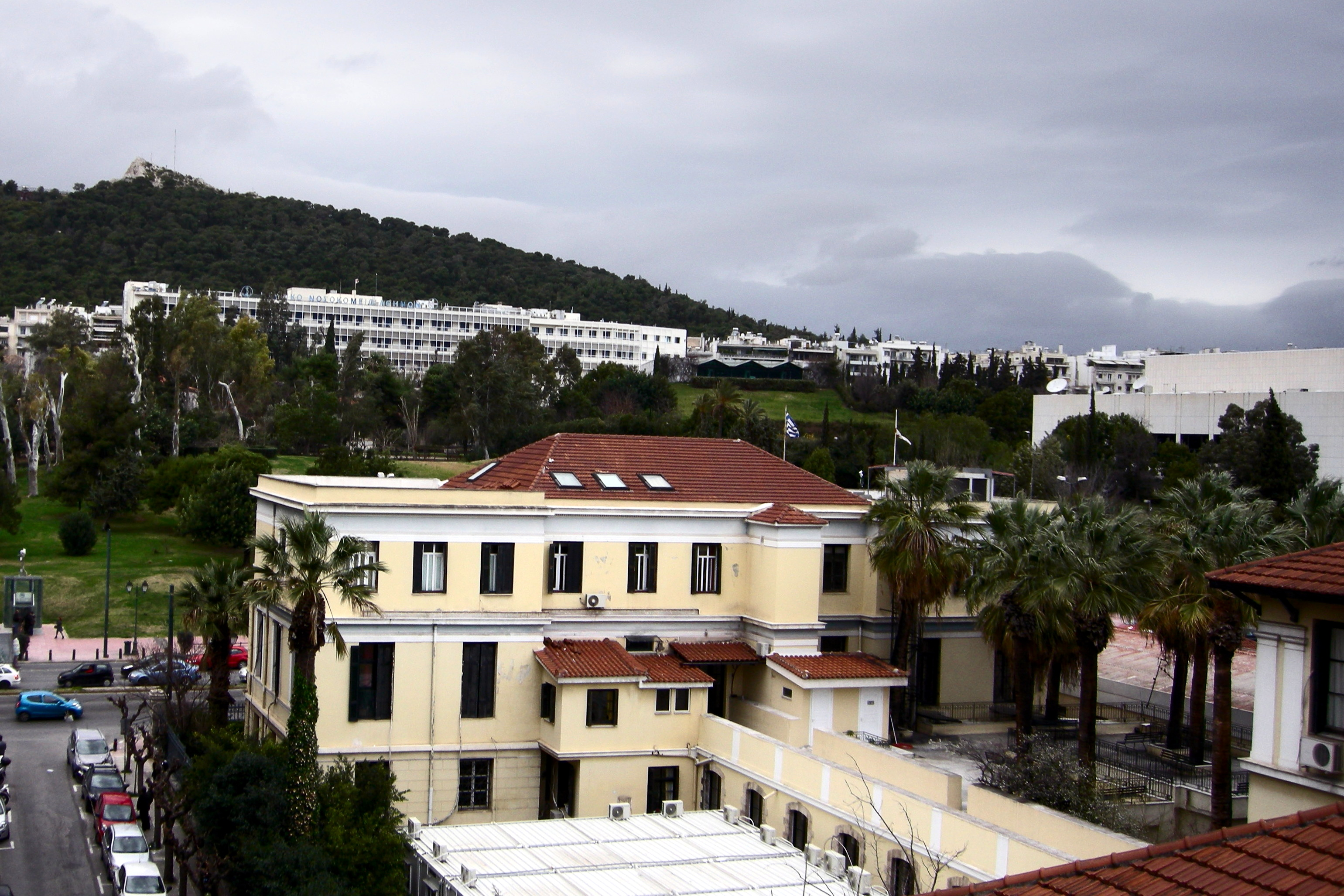
Aiginiteio Hospital, Athens

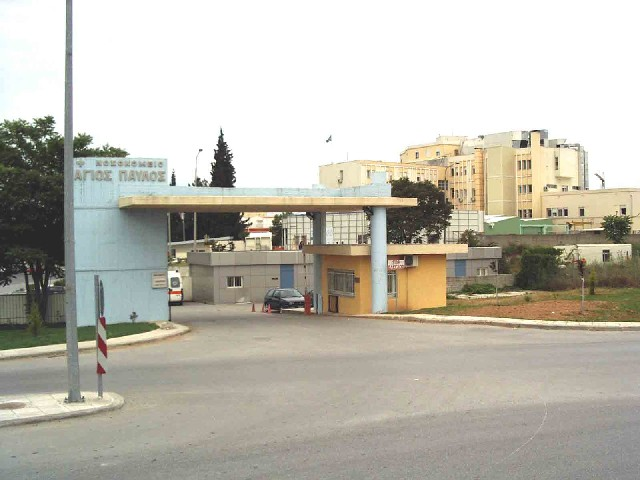
Agios Pavlos General Hospital, Thessaloniki

In 2009 the hospital bed to 10,000 population ratio in the country was 48, above countries such as the United Kingdom (39), Spain (34) and Italy (39), but considerably below countries such as France (72) and Germany (83). On 1 July 2011, the Ministry for Health and Social Solidarity announced its intention to cut back the number of beds and hospitals in the country from 131 hospitals with 35,000 beds to 83 hospitals with 33,000 beds.

Currently the largest hospital in the country is Attica Psychiatric Hospital "Dafni" with 1,325 beds, while the largest general hospital is "Evangelismos" General Hospital of Athens with 1,100 beds. Public hospitals in Greece are constructed by a government-owned company by the name of DEPANOM. S.A. (Greek: Δημόσια Επιχείρηση Ανέγερσης Νοσηλευτικών Μονάδων Α.Ε., ΔΕΠΑΝΟΜ Α.Ε., Public Corporation for the Construction of Hospital Units S.A.), which is also in charge of maintaining and upgrading the country's public medical facilities and equipment.

Emergency, ambulance and air-ambulance services in Greece are provided by the National Center for First Aid, known mostly by the acronym EKAB (Greek: Εθνικό Κέντρο Άμεσης Βοήθειας).

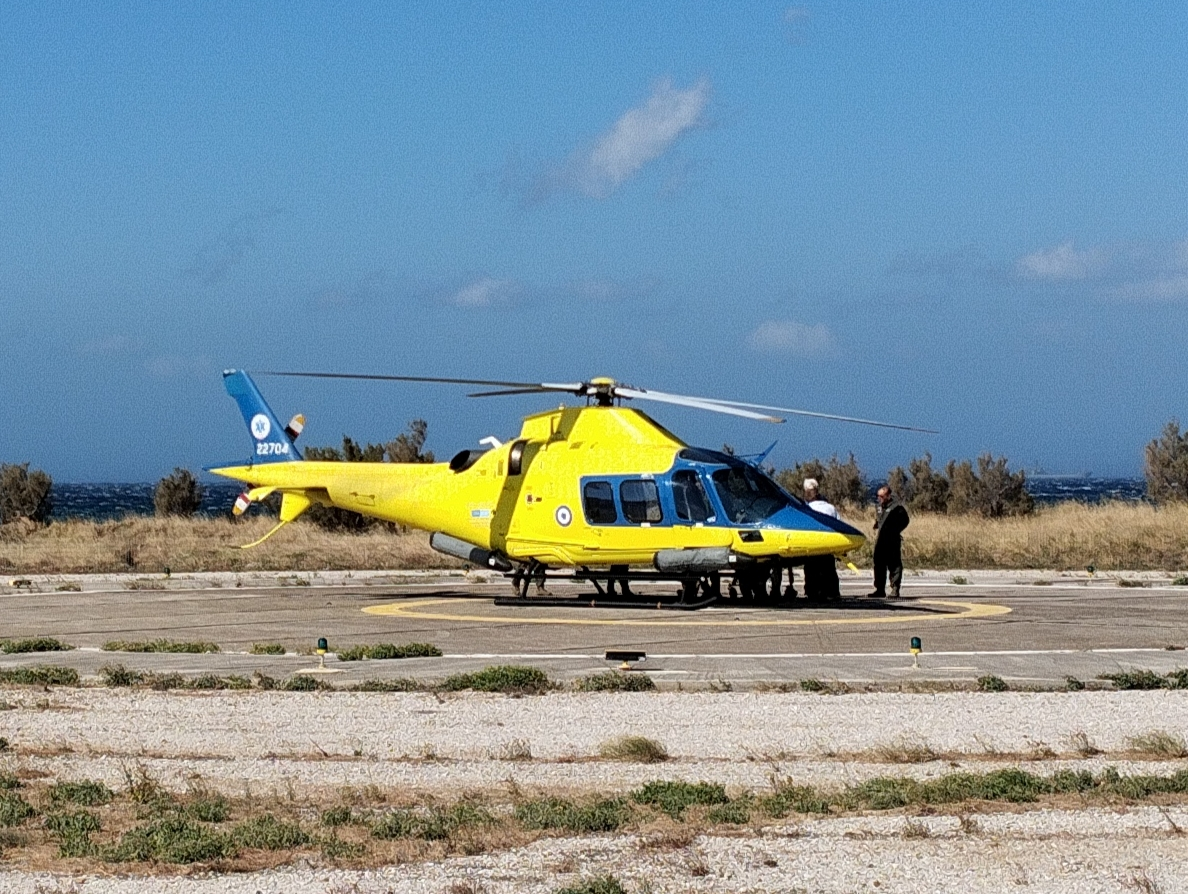
An EKAB Agusta A109 helicopter during the transport of a patient from Tinos island.

== Statistics ==
On an OECD health report in 2011, Greece got the following results:

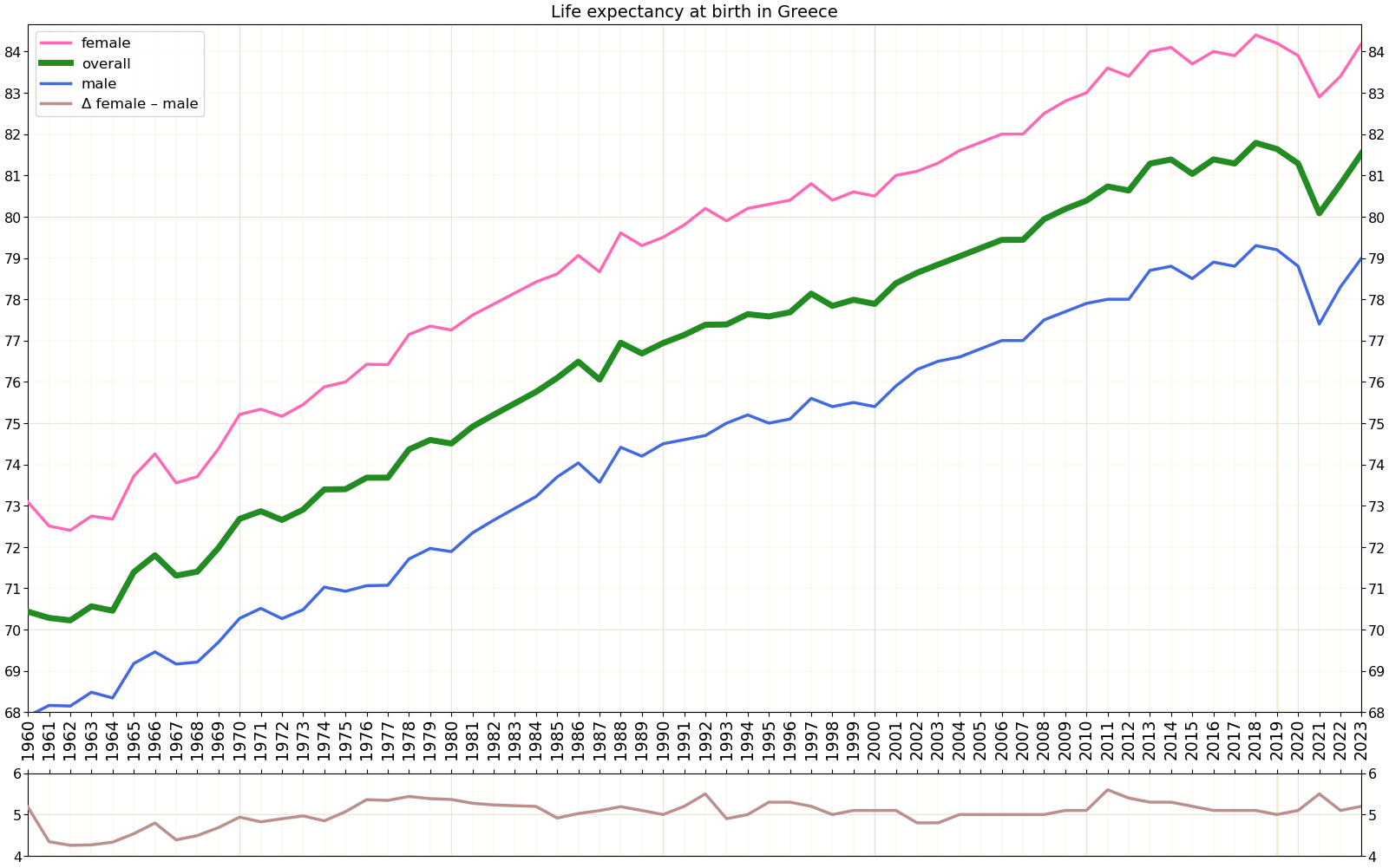
Life expectancy development in Greece by gender

Greek data from 2007
	Greece	OECD average	Rank
Health expenditure as % of GDP	9.6%	9.5%	15th
Health expenditure per capita	$2,724	$3,223	23rd
Change in health expenditure (2000–2007)	6.9%	4.0%	
% health expenditure publicly funded	60.3%	71.7%	
Doctors to population ratio	6.1	3.1	1st
Acute beds per 1,000 population	4.1	3.5	
Life expectancy (years)	80.3	79.5	
Daily smokers among adults	39.7%	22.3%	1st
Obesity rate	18.1%	15.1%	

Healthcare expenditure per capita went down by 28% between 2009 and 2011 - a more drastic cut than any other European country. However treatment results have not deteriorated, but according to the survey conducted by the Euro health consumer index in 2015 Albania was the European country in which unofficial payments to doctors were reported most commonly. The Greek rates of Caesarean sections is one of the highest in the world.

With respect to pharmaceutical drugs in use, ~20% were generic at the end of 2013 and the government has set a goal of reaching 60% generic use by the end of 2015. This planned major increase in generic use has been driven by conditions of economic support from the European Union and International Monetary Fund requiring that Greece reduce overall public spending on drugs.

Greece has the highest number of doctors per head of population of any OECD country. 6.3 doctors per thousand people in 2013.

=== Budget ===
Reference year	Expenditures on Health	% of GDP
2001	2,226,913,815.29	1.46%
2002	2,506,731,592.68	1.53%
2003	3,634,660,257.11	2.03%
2004	3,820,240,156.58	1.97%
2005	6,576,128,731.97	3.3%
2006	4,139,325,594.90	1.90%
2007	4,505,159,782.12	1.94%
2008	4,813,070,916.52	1.99%
2009	6,865,879,441.65	2.89%
2010	6,072,283,937.95	2.71%
2011	5,949,567,637.01	2.93%
2012	5,402,710,836.50	2.87%
2013	7,795,945,510.07	4.33%
2014	5,142,950,693.99	2.91%
2015	4,340,090,556.85	2.46%
2016	6,196,284,248.42	3.55%
2017	4,304,859,601.99	2.43%
2018	3,971,251,397.88	2.21%
2019	4,074,587,456.24	2.22%
2020	4,656,114,112.92	2.83%
2021	5,333,708,713.67	2.94%
2022	5,311,629,704.13	2.79%
2023	4,776,460,000	2.46%
2024	5,705,031,000	2.86%

== See also ==
- Ministry of Health (Greece)
- Social Insurance Institute
