= Conrad Nwawo =

Nigerian military officer (1922–2016)

Conrad Dibia Nwawo
- Born: 1922; Onicha Olona, Delta State
- Died: 2016 (aged 93–94); Onicha Olona, Delta State
- Burial place: Onicha Olona, Delta State
- Military career
- Allegiance: Nigeria (1950–1966); Biafra (1967–1970)
- Service years: 1950–1966 (Nigerian Army); 1967–1970 (Biafran Army)
- Units: 11 Div; 13 Div
- Commands: Commando Forces

Conrad Dibia Nwawo (1922 – 2016) was a military officer. He took part actively in the Nigeria-Biafra Civil War, initially fighting on the Nigerian side and then switching to the Biafran side.

== Early life ==
Born in 1922, Nwawo hails from Akwubili, Ogbeobi in Onicha Olona, in Aniocha North LGA of present-day Delta state. He schooled at Aggrey Memorial School in Arochukwu, under the tutelage of Dr. Alvan Ikoku, and also attended the Ilesha Grammar School.

== Career ==
At the outset of the Nigerian civil war, Nwawo led the government army in the Mid-West State of southern Nigeria. However, he switched sides after the province was captured by Biafran forces under the command of Victor Banjo. During his time fighting on the Biafran side during the Nigerian-Biafran Civil War, he headed commands such as the 11 Div, the 13 Div, and the Biafra Commando Forces.

== Post-Civil war ==
After the Civil War, Nwawo contacted his colleagues to join him in seeking for the creation of Mid-Western Region from the erstwhile Western Region, amongst which were Dr. George Orewa, Mr. F. C. Halim, Chief Israel Amadi Emina and Chief Izah.
