= Owa-Oyibu =

- Village
- Location in Nigeria
- Coordinates: 6°11′8.16″N 6°12′1.44″E
- Country: Nigeria
- State: Delta State
- LGA: Ika North East
- Federal Constituency: Ika
- Senatorial District: Delta North

Government
  - Obi: HRM. Dr Emmanuel Efeizomor 11

Area
  - Total: 20 km^{2} (7.7 sq mi)

Demographics
  - Religions: Christianity, African Traditions
- Climate: Aw

Owa-Oyibu is a community of the Ika Ethnic Nationality of Delta State, Nigeria. It is the headquarters of Ika North East. It borders Agbor, Abavo and Boji Boji Owa. The king of Owa-Oyibu is His Royal Majesty, Obi, Dr. Emmanuel Efeizomor 11. He became the 11th Efeizomor in September 1959.
