= Taleveras =

Nigerian business conglomerate

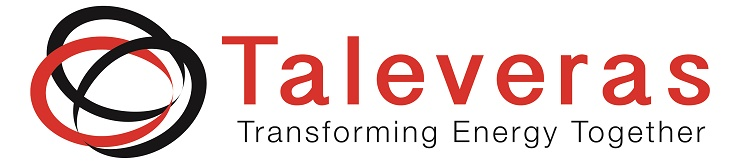
- Industry: Oil and Gas, and Power Generation and Transmission
- Founded: 2004
- Headquarters: Maitama, Abuja, Nigeria
- Key people: Igho Sanomi (Founder and Chairman)
- Products: Services and installation for power generation and transmission, oil and gas
- Website: https://taleveras.com/

Taleveras is a Nigerian business conglomerate, privately owned with business interests in energy and infrastructure, oil and gas exploration, production, trading and supply, power and construction. Taleveras' offices are located in London, Geneva, Abuja, Lagos, Abidjan, Cape Town and Dubai.

== History ==
Taleveras was founded and incorporated in 2004 by a Nigerian businessman, Igho Sanomi.

== Operations ==
Taleveras is a fully integrated company offering energy, power generation and construction services. Its activities in the energy industry are primarily centred on the physical sourcing and marketing of oil. It also provides engineering and power services. "Taleveras is a diversified energy and infrastructure conglomerate concentrating on oil & gas trading and supply, with further activities in power and construction." According to Forbes, Taleveras "trades over 100 million barrels of crude oil as well as several million tons of gasoline, LPG and jet fuel. In April 2012, Taleveras acquired production-sharing contracts (PSCs) for three offshore oil blocks in Ivory Coast. In June 2013, Taleveras sold a 65% stake in one of its Ivorian offshore upstream projects to Lukoil of Russia for an undisclosed price. Taleveras has sold its remaining stake in the Ivorian oil blocks. Taleveras also owns a stake in a power distribution firm in Nigeria."

Venture-Africa, a bi-monthly Pan-African business magazine that champions African capitalism, describes Taleveras thus: "trading close to a billion barrels of crude oil and millions of tons of condensates, gasoline, jet fuel, condensates and LPG every year. Taleveras also owns substantial stakes in two oil blocks in Nigeria as well as lucrative production sharing contracts in three offshore oil blocks in Ivory Coast. The group's power subsidiary constructs electrical substations in Nigeria and recently acquired a majority stake in the Port Harcourt Electricity Distribution Company. Taleveras has an annual turnover of several billions of dollars. Igho Sanomi is the controlling shareholder of the group."

On 30 July 2013, Taleveras emerged the bidders for Afam Power Plc. In October 2013, Taleveras signed a technical agreement with Alstom Group for the rehabilitation and capacity expansion of the 776 megawatts Afam power plant located in Rivers State. Patrick Kron, who is the chairman and chief executive (Président-directeur général) of the French engineering conglomerate signed the deal with Taleveras on his visit to the President of Nigeria, Dr. Goodluck Jonathan, which had in attendance Nigerian business leaders and members of the international business community in Lagos, Nigeria.

The president and Chairman of Taleveras, Igho Sanomi, led a delegation to Ivory Coast in November, where an upstream deal with the government of the francophone West African State for offshore Block CI-523 were signed and sealed with officials of the Ministry of Energy and Petroleum, PETROCI, the national oil company of Ivory Coast, and Afren, the London Stock Exchange-listed independent oil and gas company. Taleveras had earlier acquired an interest in Afren's CI-525, located near the Ghanaian border in Ivory Coast.

In December 2013, an oil industry services group, Petrofac, in conjunction with Taleveras Energy Resources, signed a memorandum of understanding detailing a five-year co-operation agreement with the Nigerian Petroleum Development Company, which seeks to support "NPDC's aims to further build indigenous capacity and technical capabilities of NPDC & its affiliates." In the MOU, Petrofac and Taleveras agree to "provide financial, technical, and capacity and capability building support for the further development of NPDC's offshore block OML119 in a risk-based support agreement, by which reserves and license ownership are retained by NPDC."

Taleveras is a member of an indigenous consortium, Aiteo Consortium, which won the Oil Mining Lease (OML) 29, "the largest oil block among the four blocks offered to prospective reputable investors" by Shell Petroleum Development Company (SPDC). The consortium made the highest bid of $2.85 billion to defeat competitors.

In January 2015, Taleveras signed a deal with the government of Equatorial Guinea "to build a giant oil storage hub in the central African country. The Bioko Island facility will have a total capacity of 1.34 million tonnes of storage for crude oil and products such as gasoline, naphtha, jet fuel and fuel oil, the firm said. It will be the largest crude and products storage facility in Africa."

== Crude Oil Swap ==
Taleveras Petroleum Trading BV, an arm of Taleveras was one of Nigerian companies, whose services were enlisted by Duke Oil, an international oil trading company wholly owned by the Nigerian National Petroleum Corporation (NNPC). The arrangement is "crude for product exchange process barter arrangement, which simply means you load the crude and you deliver refined petroleum products mainly gasoline based on crude lifted." In February 2011, Taleveras Petroleum Trading BV entered into a Management and Operation Agreement with Duke Oil "to operate and manage its Crude and Product Exchange Agreement" with NNPC and Pipelines and Product Marketing Company (PPMC) from February 2011 until December 2014. At the height of the fuel subsidy crises in Nigeria, which culminated in the Nigeria Extractive Industries Transparency Initiative (NEITI) probing the downstream sector of Nigerian petroleum industry in 2012 and its subsequent verification exercise, Taleveras was considered to have implemented its side of the deal to the letter.

== Corporate social responsibility ==
Taleveras is involved in Global Initiative for Peace, Love and Care (GIPLC), a Non-Governmental Organisation with a mission "to promote sustainable programs and activities that will ensure a better life for the Orphaned and Vulnerable Children (OVC)." Taleveras sponsored the 2010 and 2011 Kaduna International Polo Tourneys respectively. It also supported the maiden edition of Africa Youth Athletics Championships, held in Warri, Delta State in 2010, with "Ten Million Naira (N10m)." The company was commended by Commissioner of Sports, Delta State, Nigeria, Amaju Pinnick for its contribution to Sports.

Taleveras is a major contributor to Dickens Sanomi Foundation (DSF), a charity organisation founded in 2011 to commemorate the life of late Dickens Sanomi. The Foundation organises an annual essay competition for all Nigerian secondary school pupils. Its 3rd edition, tagged '2013 Dickens Sanomi Annual Essay Competition' has been held. The foundation is also involved in Strauss musical competition, which promotes musical development in children and competition for adult writers.
