= Igho Sanomi =

Nigerian businessman and philanthropist

Igho Charles Sanomi
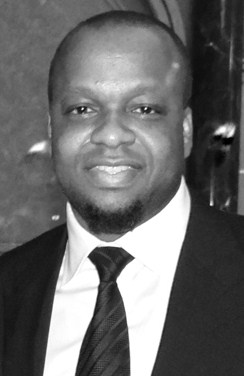
- Sanomi in 2013
- Born: 17 May 1975 (age 51); Agbor, Delta State, Nigeria
- Occupations: Businessman and geologist
- Known for: founding Taleveras
- Website: ighosanomi.com

Igho Charles Sanomi (born 17 May 1975) is a Nigerian billionaire businessman, geologist and philanthropist with business interests in oil, power, logistics, telecommunications, the maritime industry, aviation and real estate.

== Background ==
Igho Charles Sanomi II was born in Agbor, Delta State, Nigeria, the fifth child and first son of a Catholic family. His father, Dickens Ogheneruemu Patrick Sanomi, was the second national vice-president of the Urhobo Progress Union (UPU) and a retired Assistant Inspector General of Police (AIG) in the Nigeria Police Force. His mother, Mabel Iyabo Sanomi, is a yeye jemo (tribal chief) of the Isotun Ijesha kingdom in Osun State in south-western Nigeria and a former nurse. Sanomi received a bachelor's degree in geology and mining from the University of Jos, Plateau State, in Nigeria's Middle Belt.

== Career ==
Sanomi founded Taleveras Group (a Nigerian energy-trading company) in 2004. According to Forbes, Taleveras

... trades over 100 million barrels of crude oil as well as several million tons of gasoline, LPG and jet fuel. In April 2012, Taleveras acquired production sharing contracts (PSCs) for three offshore oil blocks in Ivory Coast. In June 2013, Taleveras sold a 65% stake in one of its Ivorian offshore upstream projects to Lukoil of Russia for an undisclosed price. Taleveras also owns a stake in a power distribution firm in Nigeria.

Venture-Africa, a bimonthly Pan-African business magazine about African capitalism, described the group as

... trading close to a billion barrels of crude oil and millions of tons of condensates, gasoline, jet fuel, condensates and LPG every year. Taleveras also owns substantial stakes in two oil blocks in Nigeria as well as lucrative production sharing contracts (PSCs) in three offshore oil blocks in Ivory Coast. The group Power subsidiary constructs electrical substations in Nigeria and recently acquired a majority stake in the Port Harcourt Electricity Distribution Company. Taleveras has an annual turnover of several billions of dollars. Igho Sanomi is the controlling shareholder of the group."

On 30 July 2013, Taleveras Group acquired Afam Power. It was one of the Nigerian companies reportedly awarded oil-lifting contracts in the federal government's bid, through the Nigerian National Petroleum Corporation (NNPC), to award nearly half of the 2012–2013 lifting contracts (worth $60 billion) to indigenous companies—promoting local content and "downsizing contracts awarded to international oil traders".

In October of that year, Taleveras Group signed a technical agreement with Alstom Group for the rehabilitation and expansion of the 776-megawatt Afam power plant in Rivers State. Patrick Kron, chairman and chief executive (président-directeur général) of the French engineering conglomerate, signed the agreement with Taleveras Group during his visit with Nigerian president Goodluck Jonathan, Nigerian business leaders and members of the international business community in Lagos, Nigeria.

== Philanthropy ==
Sanomi and his siblings founded the Dickens Sanomi Foundation (DSF) in 2011 to commemorate the life of their father, and he is the foundation's chairman. The DSF, funded by Taleveras Group and the Midel Group, limits its activities to Nigeria.

=== Essay competition ===
In 2014, the Dickens Sanomi Foundation began sponsoring an annual essay competition open to all Nigerian secondary-school pupils. The competition, which has attracted as many as 250 entries, is divided into junior and senior secondary-school students. The first prize for the winner of each group is a scholarship, and the schools attended by the winners receive grants for facilities such as computer equipment.

=== Flood aid ===
The foundation's Project Rescue 10,000 Flood Victims aided about 12,300 people displaced by floods which ravaged communities in Delta State in October 2012, donating food and relief material worth millions of naira to flood victims at settlements in the Ughelli, Ewu, Arhavwarhien, Orere and Okparabe communities and the Ughelli North and South local government areas of Delta State. According to a Vanguard report, "The displaced persons were rescued in 500 seater engine and speed boats from communities in Ughelli North, Ughelli South, Patani, Isoko North, Isoko South and Burutu Local Government Areas of Delta State and were subsequently taken to some government designated camps". This Day's society editor, Lanre Alfred, wrote: "The Dickens Sanomi Foundation gave out a comprehensive funding package worth over ₦100 million to flood victims in Delta and Bayelsa State, as part of its intervention programme to mitigate the effects of the devastating flood on the people".

=== Non-governmental organisations ===
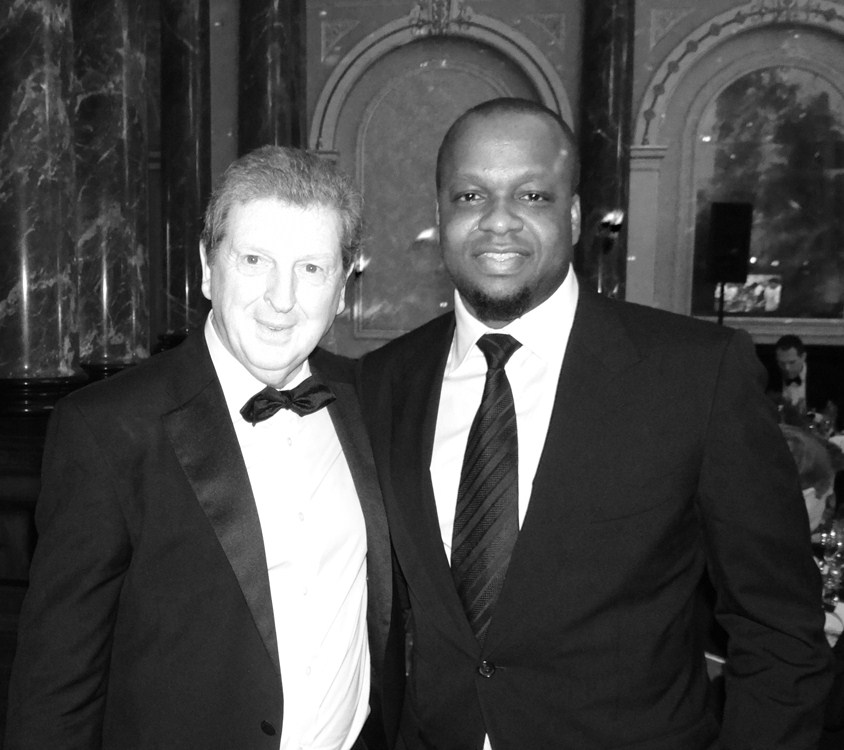
Sanomi and England football coach Roy Hodgson at a Bobby Moore Fund event in London

Through the Dickens Sanomi Foundation, Sanomi has reportedly pledged a "substantial grant" to the Bobby Moore Fund for cancer research in the UK "to help fund vital prostate cancer research" and received the Martin Luther King Legacy Award for philanthropy. The foundation also pledged funds to Save the Children and Oxfam. Sanomi was appointed to the West Africa Book Development Fund's advisory board. He became the honorary chair of the Martin Luther King, Jr. International Salute Committee, taking over from the late Ade Adefuye.

Sanomi co-sponsored the Dance Theatre of Harlem's first Latin American tour in Tegucigalpa from 31 January to 6 February 2014. According to a press release on the U. S. Embassy website, "DTH's trip was also made possible by Igho Charles Sanomi II, Executive Director of Taleveras Group." Sanomi is involved in the Global Initiative for Peace, Love and Care (GIPLC), a non-governmental organisation with a mission "to promote sustainable programs and activities that will ensure a better life for the Orphaned and Vulnerable Children (OVC)", through his company's partnership.

=== Sports ===
Sanomi presented a ₦10 million cheque to Delta State Sports Commissioner Amaju Pinnick, pledging his support for the first Africa Youth Athletics Championships in Warri in 2010: "We share in the vision of Delta State in many aspects, especially in the area of sports development". Pinnick commended Taleveras for its contribution to sports.

Sanomi is a polo enthusiast. Taleveras participated in the 2010 Kaduna International Polo Tourney and sponsored the 2011 tournament.

== Honours ==
In the first edition its Choiseul 100 Africa, published in September 2014, the Institut Choiseul for International Politics and Geoeconomics ranked Sanomi number one among "growing business leaders, successful entrepreneurs, investors, etc." who "embody the dynamism and renewal of a whole continent and carry the hopes of an entire generation". The list "identifies and ranks the young African leaders of 40 years old and under, who will play a major role in the development of Africa in the near future". He also topped the 2015 list. In 2013, Sanomi was nominated by Nigeria's Ministry of Industry, Trade and Investment for a post on the Nigeria-South Africa Business Council. He received a Corporate/Friends of the Police Award at the first Police Sports Awards on 28 February 2014 in Abuja. Sanomi was cited by Forbes as one of "Ten Young African Millionaires to Watch in 2013", and was ranked one of Africa's top 25 oil and gas leaders of that year by African Leadership magazine.

He received Mode Men magazine's Humanitarian of the Year Award in 2012. Sanomi was a speaker at the 2014 Africa Global Business Forum in Dubai, and was scheduled to speak again at the forum the following year. He is a recipient of the African Leadership Award. Sanomi received the 2014 Africa's Emerging Community Development Icon Award, and was granted honorary citizenship in the U.S. state of Georgia.
