= Umunede =

- Town
- Location in Nigeria
- Coordinates: 6°16′7.68″N 6°18′24.12″E
- Country: Nigeria
- State: Delta State
- LGA: Ika North East
- Federal Constituency: Ika
- Senatorial District: Delta North

Government
  - Obi: HRH. Dr. Ezeagwu Ezenwali 1, FMNR (JP), Agadagidi

Area
  - Total: 20 km^{2} (7.7 sq mi)

Demographics
  - Ethnicities: Ika
  - Languages: Ika language, Nigerian Pidgin, English language
  - Religions: Christianity, African Traditions
- Climate: Aw

Umunede is a community of the Ika speaking people of Delta State, Nigeria. It is the largest town in Ika North East with over 50,000 people. On the eastern part of the town, it neighbors Akumazi and Ekwuoma, while Agbor and Emuhu are its neighbors on the west. On the north is Mbiri, Igbodo on the north-east, Otolokpo and Owa on the south. The king of Umunede is His Royal Highness, Dr. Ezeagwu Ezenwali 1, FMNR (JP), Agadagidi, the Obi of Umunede kingdom.
