= Ika language =

There are two unrelated languages named Ika:

- Ika language (Colombia), also known as Arhuaco
- Ika language (Nigeria), a language in Delta State, Nigeria, spoken by the Ika people
