= Tundun Abiola =

Nigerian lawyer and TV presenter

- Occupations: Television presenter, Lawyer

Tundun Abiola is a Nigerian lawyer and TV presenter at Arise News.

== Biography ==
Abiola was born to businessman and politician, Chief MKO Abiola.

She was nominated for the 2021 Nigeria Outlook Women Trailblazer Awards.

Abiola married Benue State-born Atama Attah at the Claridges Hotel, Mayfair, London, it ended shortly after.
