= Igbanke =

- Town
- Motto: Onukokomeh Ogbu Ofifi
- Location in Nigeria
- Coordinates: 6°23′13″N 6°09′53″E
- Country: Nigeria
- State: Edo

Government
  - Type: Monarchical
  - Obi/Eze: Obi of Ake, Obi of Oligie, Eze of Idumodin, Eze of Omulua, Obi of Ottah, Eze of Igbontor

Area
  - Total: 170.3 km^{2} (65.8 sq mi)

Population (2017)
  - Total: 85,000
  - Density: 499.2/km^{2} (1,293/sq mi)
- Postal code: 301104
- Climate: Aw

Igbanke is an Ika community ceded into Orhionmwon, Edo State. Igbanke belongs to the igbanke speaking Ika group with a significant number in the Ika South and North East LGAs of Delta State.

Igbanke was politically ceded into Edo State during the creation of the state on August 27, 1991, through the influence of Samuel Ogbemudia hence separating them from the larger Ika group in Delta State where they belong. The Igbanke community is divided into 6 villages: Omolua, Ottah, Idumuodin, Ake, Oligie and Igbontor.

== History ==
Igbanke originated from six villages which came together from the earliest times preceding the slave trade era. The people of Idumodin, Ake/Obiogba, Omolua, Oligie, Ottah and Igbontor are the villages that came together to establish their settlement which over the years has been referred to as Igbanke.

=== Language ===
Although, majority of the Igbanke people speak "Ika" dialect, some of them are bilinguals, that is, some of them speak more than one language fluently, that is, the Igbo language and that is because in its real sense, Ika language is a dialect of the wider Igbo language. For instance, the people of Enugu, Anambra, Ebonyi, Imo and Abia respectively all have different dialects of Igbo but understand each other and the same goes to the anioma people which Igbanke is a bonafide part of due to their Ika ancestry. This explains why every Ika speaker, including Ndi-Igbanke understands the general Igbo dialect, sharing several similar words.

== Culture and Tradition ==
The Egu festival is one of the cultural and traditional activities that is celebrated at Igbanke. The Egu Festival is also referred to as Ohiuhiu. It is a religious feast done in honour of the head deity of Igbanke. This god is known as the god of harvest and sustainer of the people. This festival precedes the new yam harvest, so it is fondly called the New yam festival. It is often held between the month of August and September and the duration of the festival is one month full of various activities that are held every market day which is the Eken, that is every four days.

Before the announcement of Egu by the Eze or Obi of the various villages, they must meet and perform the Okika Nmo which is the sacrifice to the gods of the land, performed by the kings. Part of the festival is making the community clean by clearing the bushes and roads in the villages by the youths and the painting of walls and palaces by women, which is usually done with native chalk called "nzu" and red earth. They do all these, believing that some of their ancestors would visit them. Also, family heads appease their gods which is also part of the cleansing, water yam pudding known as ‘Embeghe’ is prepared to drive evil away from the land. Those who worship "Nwa Obu" from other villages and other towns also come to Igbanke for the Egu festival in order to join their brethren in Igbake to appease "Nwa Obu" on behalf of the land. After the Embeghe, on the Eken which is the market day, the Nni Ogwa Ukin, that is, the ‘night food’ is prepared using the old yams and with some local spices to appease the gods and ancestors in the night, this is eaten around 11pm. After this is the Nni Ogwa Efinai, the ”afternoon food” which is sacrifice to the gods in the day time. Uroko dance is performed round the villages by the men dancing and visiting every compound entertaining and also collecting variety of gifts from people. This happens just for few days before the next Eken day.

On "Ohiuhiu" day, the "Nwa Obu" priest in the night goes to the forest hill where the NwaObu shrine is located at Ogbogbo. He is accompanied by the worshippers, including priests, priestesses and the Otu Ikpedi; their drummers and various dance groups. The people are entertained by the musicians and dancers while waiting for Nwa Obu priest to return from the shrine because the priest is the only one meant to perform the rituals, the people only give their supports. The priest distribute Nzu to the people which was dug out from the shrine after the sacrifice. People come from various communities for cleansing and healing. Also, part of the activities is the wrestling contests between various clans and dancing competition which is done at the village square. The warrior who is the strongest during the competition will be given a title.

Towards the last week of the festival, the people share gifts among themselves. Gifts are shared between relatives and friends and all married women are permitted to go to their maiden family to prepare food for them and spend some time with them.

On the last Eken day of the festival, the Egu is brought to a close by the Nwa Obu priests, who goes around to pray for people from house-to-house. The prayer marks the end and the completion of the Egu Festival before the people start eating the new yam.

=== Occupation ===
Igbanke is located within the rain forest belt of the vegetation zone of West Africa. Traditionally, the Igbanke people are majorly farmers. Their agricultural products are yams, cassava, vegetables and plantain. Other occupations include hunting, trading, and medicine. The women are mostly traders. The Igbanke Eken Market, located at Oligie, served as a major market that connected the northern and southern regions during the colonial era. some Igbanke people are also craftsmen/women and some specialize in blacksmithing, pottery, and basket making among others. There are also traditional midwives and healers, and diviners in Igbanke. However, in modern times, the Igbanke are represented in most fields of human endeavors across the world

=== Governance ===
Igbanke people practice an autonomous kind of leadership. Each of the villages is govern by its traditional ruler, addressed as the Eze or Obi.

== Notable people ==
- Divine Ikubor, known professionally as Rema, musician.
- Ugbekile David Osemeke, known professionally as Boy Spyce, singer and songwriter.
- Samuel Ogbemudia, former governor of the Midwest region of Nigeria and later Bendel state
