= Agios Pavlos General Hospital =

Coordinates: 40.5779°N 22.9703°E

Agios Pavlos General Hospital Saint Paul General Hospital
- Ministry of Health and Social Solidarity
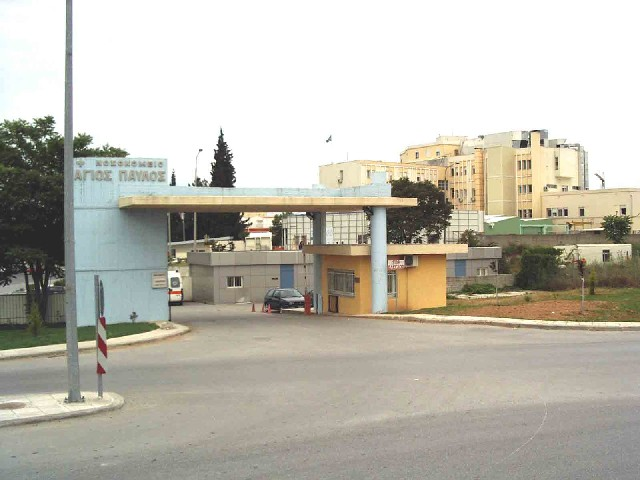
- The main entrance of the hospital.

Geography
- Location: Ethnikis Antistaseos 161, Kalamaria, Thessaloniki, Central Macedonia, Greece

Organisation
- Care system: Social Insurance Institute (In Greek: I.K.A. - Ίδρυμα Κοινωνικών Ασφαλίσεων)
- Funding: Government - Public
- Type: General

Services
- Beds: approx. 201

Links
- Website: http://www.agpavlos.gr Official Webpage

Agios Pavlos (Greek: Νοσοκομείο Άγιος Παύλος) is a general hospital located in Thessaloniki, Greece, on the borders of Kalamaria and Pylaia areas.

== Departments ==
- Anaesthetics Department
- Cardiology Department
- Critical Care Department
- Internal Medicine Department
- Dental Department
- Surgical Department
- Diagnostic imaging Department
- Haematology Department
- Microbiology Department
- Orthopaedics Department
- Pharmacy Department
- Rheumatology Department
- Blood Donation Department

== Facilities ==
The hospital offers parking services of approximately 150 slots.
