= Boy Spyce =

Nigerian singer-songwriter (born 2001)

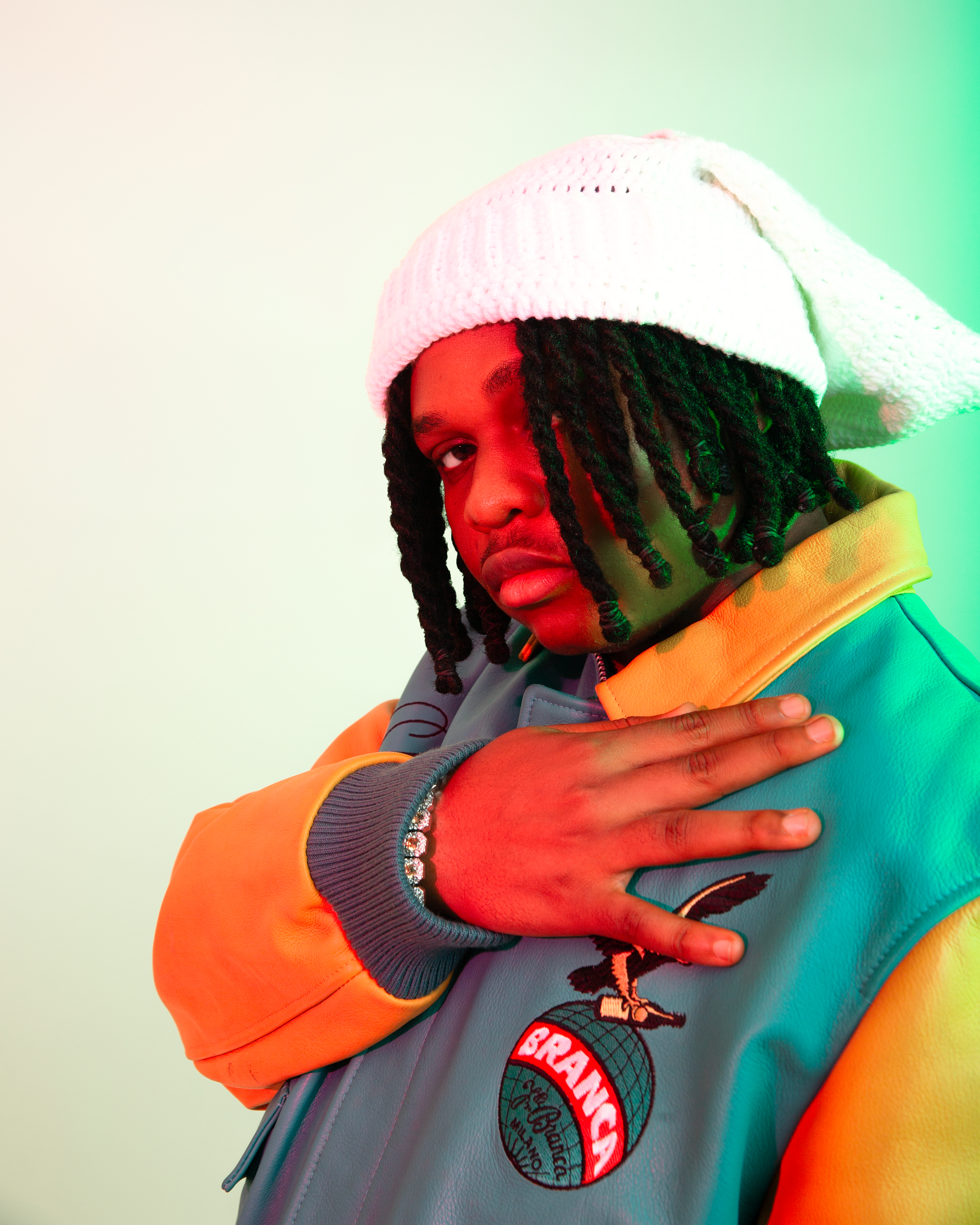
- Boy Spyce

Background information
- Born: Ugbekile David Osemeke; 10 May 2001 (age 25); Isolo, Lagos, Nigeria
- Origin: Igbanke, Edo State, Nigeria
- Genres: Afrobeats; afrofusion
- Occupations: Singer; songwriter
- Instruments: Keyboard; vocals; ukulele
- Years active: 2019–present
- Label: Mavin
- Website: boyspyce.com

YouTube information
- Channel: Boy Spyce
- Years active: 2019–present
- Genres: Music; vlogging
- Subscribers: 130 thousand
- Views: 29.8 million
- Last updated: July 10, 2025

Ugbekile David Osemeke (born 10 May 2001), known professionally as Boy Spyce, is a Nigerian singer and songwriter. He gained recognition following his 2021 cover of Wizkid's song "Essence". Its success led him to sign a recording contract with Mavin Records, which released his debut extended play, self-titled Boy Spyce, in 2022 receiving moderate commercial reception.

== Early life ==
Boy Spyce was born in Isolo, Lagos State, but hails from Edo State. He grew up living in Jakande Estate, Isolo. For his secondary education, he attended Lagos State Model College Kankon, Badagry, and he is the last born in a family of seven.

== Career ==
Boy Spyce launched his music career by posting song covers on social media platforms in 2019. In 2021, he gained recognition after posting a cover of Wizkid's hit song "Essence" featuring Tems. The cover caught the attention of Don Jazzy, the founder of Mavin Records, who offered him a recording deal and introduced him to the public on 14 April 2022. He then released his debut EP, self-titled Boy Spyce, on April 15, 2022, which peaked at number one on Nigeria's Apple Music chart. Emmanuel Esomnofu, reviewing for The Native, described the EP as "a collage of vibrant sounds and tradition" that generated significant buzz for the young artist. On 7 May 2022, Boy Spyce's single "Bad Things" led Pulse Nigeria's Future Sounds Vol. 6 playlist.

Boy Spyce was featured on Mavin's hit song "Overdose" alongside Crayon and Ayra Starr on 13 May 2022. The song ranked number 1 on TheCable's list of 10 TCL radio pick of the week on 28 May 2022.

On 29 May 2022, Boy Spyce revealed how a direct message from Don Jazzy changed his life, sharing that he received a text message from Don Jazzy on Christmas Day in 2019. He disclosed this during an interview with the Nigerian Tribune. On 30 May 2022, Spyce performed with Glitch Africa Choir for his song "Nobody".

In November 2022, he performed alongside Rema, Ayra Starr, Magixx, Ladipoe, Crayon, Johnny Drille, and Bayanni on Mavin's hit single "Wan Da Mo", earning him his second appearance on TurnTable charts.

In January 2023, he released his first single "Folake" after his debut EP, which peaked at number 5 on the Nigeria TurnTable Top 100. "Folake" was produced by Sparrq Beatz, and its accompanying music video, directed by Ahmed Moss, currently has 5 million views on YouTube as of January 2024.

On 24 January 2023, OkayAfrica cited him as one of the emerging artists to watch in 2023, alongside Khaid and Odumodublvck.

On 7 December 2023, he released "Pepe", which peaked at number 23 on the TurnTable Nigeria Top 100 on 12 January 2024, and debuted at number 13 on the Top Streaming Songs on 18 January 2024.

== Discography ==
=== EPs ===
List of extended plays, with selected details
| Title | Details |
|---|---|
| Boy Spyce | Released: 15 April 2022; Label: Mavin; Formats: Digital download |

=== Singles ===
==== As lead artist ====
List of singles as lead artist, with year released and album shown
| Title | Year | Album |
|---|---|---|
| "Dreams" | 2022 | Boy Spyce |
| "Bad Things" | 2022 | Boy Spyce |
| "Wayo" | 2022 | Boy Spyce |
| "Destiny" | 2022 | Boy Spyce |
| "Nobody" | 2022 | Boy Spyce |
| "Folake" | 2023 | Non-album singles |
| "Relationship" | 2023 | Non-album singles |
| "So Bad" | 2023 | Non-album singles |
| "Pepe" | 2023 | Non-album singles |
| "I Don't Care" (with Khaid) | 2024 | Non-album singles |
| "You (Rum & Schnapp)" | 2024 | Non-album singles |
| "Shout" | 2024 | Non-album singles |
| "Talk" | 2024 | Non-album singles |
| "I'll Be There" | 2025 | Non-album singles |
| "Achalugo" (with Jeriq) | 2025 | Non-album singles |

==== As featured artist ====
List of singles as featured artist, with year released and album shown
| Title | Year | Album |
|---|---|---|
| "Won Da Mo" and "Overloading (Overdose)" (Mavins, Crayon and Ayra Starr featuring Ladipoe, Magixx and Boy Spyce) | 2022 | Chapter X |
| "Carry Me Go" (Khaid featuring Boy Spyce) | 2023 | Non-album singles |
| "Doh" (T-Classic featuring Boy Spyce) | 2024 | Non-album singles |
