= American Oxonian =

Magazine of the Association of American Rhodes Scholars

The American Oxonian (TAO; ISSN 0003-0295) is a journal of arts, politics and letters published triannually by of the Association of American Rhodes Scholars, featuring articles of contemporary as well as historical relevance. Its first issue appeared in April 1914.

== History ==
From the beginning of the Rhodes Scholarship, the experience of American Rhodes Scholars in their Oxford University education created a bond among those who shared it and led to a desire to share their work — both academic and personal — across generations. The first attempt to create a newsletter among the American Rhodes Scholar alumni was made in 1907 with a short-lived publication called The Alumni Magazine. Seven years later, a permanent successor appeared with the first issue of the American Oxonian in April 1914 and it has existed ever since.

== List of editors ==
The following have been editors:

- 1914–1921 Frank Aydelotte (Indiana and Brasenose, 1905)
- 1921–1930 C. F. Tucker Brooke (West Virginia and St John's, 1904)
- 1930–1935 Alan Valentine (Pennsylvania and Balliol, 1922)
- 1935–1943 Crane Brinton (Massachusetts and New College, 1919)
- 1943–1946 Harvie Branscomb (Alabama and Wadham, 1914)
- 1946–1949 Gordon Keith Chalmers (Rhode Island and Wadham, 1926)
- 1949–1955 Paul S. Havens (New Jersey and University. 1925)
- 1955–1962 E. Wilson Lyon (Mississippi and St. John's, 1925)
- 2000-2014 Todd R. Breyfogle (Colorado and Corpus, 1988)
- 2014-2019 Kathrin Day Lassila (Iowa and Trinity, 1982)
- 2019-2022 Todd R. Breyfogle (Colorado and Corpus, 1988).
- 2022-pres. Lauren C. Jackson (Arkansas & Magdalen, 2017), editor-in-chief; Serena Alagappan (New York & St. John's 2020), associate editor
