= Glitch Africa =

African media platform

- Type: Private
- Industry: Media, Entertainment
- Founded: June 2021
- Founder: Best Amakhian
- Headquarters: Lagos, Nigeria
- Area served: Africa
- Products: Digital media, live performance production, podcasts
- Website: glitchafrica.com

Glitch Africa Studios Ltd, commonly known as Glitch Africa, is a pan-African media and music performance platform that highlights emerging and established African talent through live sessions, podcasts, and original digital productions. Founded in Lagos, Nigeria, in 2021 by media producer Best Amakhian, the platform was conceived as a creative studio for authentic African storytelling through sound and visual performance.

== History ==
Glitch Africa was founded in 2021 by Nigerian media producer Best Amakhian in Lagos, following over a decade of experience in television and radio production. Conceived as a creative platform for African talent, it aimed to document and present live music performances with cinematic precision and authenticity.

Artists who have performed or appeared on Glitch Africa include Rema, Nasty C, Chike, Asake, Gyakie, Black Sherif, Stonebwoy, Zuchu, Joeboy, Abigail Chams, Nkosazana Daughter, Rotimi, Emtee, and Ruger. The platform has been recognized for contributing to the evolution of live music presentation in Africa and for elevating contemporary African sound to a global audience.

The company launched with Glitch Sessions, a live performance series featuring emerging and established African artists. Known for its simple stage design, focused lighting, and emphasis on audio clarity, the series presents live performances intended to highlight the diversity of contemporary African music. Initially produced in a small Lagos studio with limited resources, Glitch Sessions gained online attention for its distinctive visual style and consistent presentation of African artists including live performances with Teni, Boy Spyce "Body" in 2022, Morravey "Feel" & "Ifineme" in 2023 and LIona & Fave "Cold war", Kojo Blak & Kelvynboy with "excellent" etc.

As the platform grew, Glitch Africa expanded to other African cities such as Accra, Nairobi, and Dar es Salaam, collaborating with regional artists and creatives to showcase African music across broader audiences.

== Divisions and platforms ==
=== Glitch Sessions ===
A digital live performance series featuring both emerging and established African artists. The series is known for its blend of sound design, lighting, and cinematic visuals, showcasing artists such as Rema, Zlatan, Asake, Nasty C, Ruger, Libianca, BNXN, Oxlade, Stonebwoy, and Black Sherif, Barry Jhay, Brown Joel, YKB & Joeboy, Young Jonn, Yemi Alade, Nissi Ogulu, Darkoo, Wendy Shay, Falz & Ajebo Hustlers, among others.

=== Glitch Africa Studios ===
The company's production division, known for developing original podcast and visual content. Its notable productions include The Honest Bunch Podcast (Nigeria), Rant, Bant & Confession (Ghana), 3 Truths, No Lie (Kenya), and Wild Tots Podcast (South Africa).

=== Glitch Gospel ===
A faith-based creative arm that merges worship, storytelling, and gospel-centered podcasts to engage modern audiences across Africa.

== See also ==
- NPR Music
- Tiny Desk Concerts
- Mahogany Sessions
- Spinlet
- YNaija
