= Boy Spyce (EP) =

EP by Boy Spyce

EP by Boy Spyce
- Released: 15 April 2022
- Recorded: 2022
- Genre: Afropop; afrobeats; dancehall; Afrofusion; R&B
- Length: 13:04
- Label: Mavin
- Producer: Andre Vibez; Johnny Drille; AykBeats; Mykah; Presto; Kezzi

Boy Spyce chronology
Boy Spyce (2022)	Freestyle (2024)

Boy Spyce is the debut extended play by Nigerian singer-songwriter Boy Spyce, released on 15 April 2022 through Mavin Records.

== Background and release ==
In April 2022, Boy Spyce signed a recording contract with Mavin Records. Following the deal, Mavin Records announced the release of his EP. The next day, the music video for "Nobody", the EP's fourth track, was released, directed by TG Omori.

== Composition ==
The five-track EP features production from Mykah, AykBeats, Kezzi, Johnny Drille, Presto, and Andre Vibez. The EP begins with "Dreams", a soulful song where Boy Spyce addresses his classmates and friends who envision continuing college, but he has dreams of pursuing a music career. The second track, "Bad Things", is an Afrobeats tune in which Boy Spyce describes a girl who desires everything, whether good or bad, but prefers the latter. The influence of Afropop is evident on "Wayo", which discusses pride and diligence. The fourth song, "Nobody", is an R&B track that expresses romantic love and pretence, inspired by a friend's love story, as revealed by Boy Spyce. The EP concludes with "Destiny", a motivational piece that emphasizes hard work, diligence, and ambition.

== Critical reception ==
Professional ratings
Review scores
Source	Rating
Pulse Nigeria	7/10

Onyema Courage and Tope Agbeyo of Pulse Nigeria described the EP as showcasing "chord progression, songwriting, breath control, and the ability to elicit strong emotions." In a review for TooXclusive, Tommy praised Boy Spyce for his "delivery infused with tuned cultural references" and "exceptional songwriting skills".

== Track listing ==
Boy Spyce track listing
No.	Title	Writer(s)	Producer(s)	Length
1.	"Dreams"	Ugbekile David; Aramide Babalola	Mykah	3:13
2.	"Bad Things"	Ugbekile David; Ayokunle Oluwatobi	AykBeats	2:50
3.	"Wayo"	Ugbekile David; Ebube Samuel Echefu; Adekunle Oluwatobi	Kezzi; AykBeats	2:41
4.	"Nobody"	Ugbekile David	Johnny Drille; Presto	2:43
5.	"Destiny"	Ugbekile David; Alexander Uwaifo	Andre Vibez	2:57
Total length:				13:04

== Release history ==
Release history and formats for Boy Spyce
Region	Date	Format	Version	Label
Various	15 April 2022	Streaming; digital download; CD	Original	Mavin
