= Fidelis Oditah =

- Born: March 27, 1964 (age 62); Igbuzo, Delta State, Nigeria
- Education: University of Lagos; University of Oxford (Magdalen College)
- Occupation: Barrister
- Known for: Commercial law, company law, insolvency law

Fidelis Oditah KC, SAN (born 27 March 1964), is a Nigerian barrister whose work covers commercial law, company law and insolvency law. He was called to the Nigerian Bar in 1985 and the English Bar in 1992. He has taught and practised in the United Kingdom and Nigeria and is an authority in insolvency law. He was the pioneer president of the International Law Association, the Nigerian Branch, from 2014 to 2023, the pioneer president of the London Court of International Arbitration (LCIA) African Users Council; a former member of the LCIA Court, and a past president of the Business Recovery and Insolvency Practitioners Association of Nigeria (BRIPAN), among many appointments

== Early life and education ==
Fidelis Oditah was born on 27 March 1964 at Igbuzo, Delta State, Nigeria, to Augustine and Vera Oditah. His parents were schoolteachers in what was then the Midwestern State civil service and, like most civil servants of that era, were frequently transferred from one town to another. He started his primary school in January 1969 at Agbor Obi, Delta State, during the Nigerian civil war, and completed it at Local Authority School, Igbodo, also in Delta State, in June 1974.

He attended St Anthony’s College, Ubulu-Uku, where he completed his school certificate. In September 1979, he was admitted for a higher school certificate into the Federal Government College Warri, from where he gained admission to study law at the University of Lagos in June 1981. He graduated from the University of Lagos in June 1984 with a First Class Honours degree.

He attended the Nigerian Law School between 1984 and 1985 for his vocational legal studies and qualified in June 1985 with a First Class. He was called to the Nigerian Bar in August 1985. In September 1985, he was posted to the Nigerian Law School to teach as the pioneer Youth corper under the Nigerian National Youth Service programme, which he completed in August 1986.

In September 1986, he went to the University of Oxford to pursue postgraduate studies with the assistance of a Commonwealth Scholarship awarded by the United Kingdom Government, enabling him to study at the University of Oxford (Magdalen College) between 1986 and 1989, where he obtained the degrees of Bachelor of Civil Law (BCL, 1987), Doctor of Philosophy (DPhil, 1989) and Master of Arts by special resolution (MA, 1989). He completed his DPhil thesis in two years partly because that was the time left of his three-year scholarship and partly because he was to take up a full-time teaching appointment at Oxford University, Faculty of Law, in October 1989.

== Academic career ==
In October 1989, he was elected a Fellow and Tutor in Law at Merton College, Oxford, and Travers Smith Lecturer in Corporate Finance Law at the Oxford University Faculty of Law. Between 1989 and 1997, he taught undergraduate and graduate courses in contracts, trusts, company law, corporate finance and corporate insolvency, and supervised and examined a number of doctoral students both at Oxford and other universities. He also acted as an external examiner at the University of Bristol, Nottingham and London School of Economics and Political Science. He was a visiting professor at the University of Virginia Law School in the fall of 1992. He also served as a consultant to the United Nations Commission on International Trade Law (UNCITRAL) from 1995 to 1999. He was the keynote speaker at the Nigerian Law School 40th anniversary in 2004, the convocation lecturer at the University of Lagos 2006 convocation, and the keynote speaker at the conference of Deans of African University Law Faculties in 2013, among many public lectures. Fidelis Oditah left full-time teaching at Oxford in 1997 to pursue practice as a commercial and chancery barrister in the City of London but returned to Oxford in 2000 as a visiting professor, in which capacity he continued to supervise and examine doctoral students and give graduate seminars. He has lectured and published widely on contracts, banking, company law, insolvency, constitutional law, civil litigation, commercial arbitration and public law.

== Books ==
Fidelis Oditah is the author of several works, including

- Legal Aspects of Receivables Financing
- The Future for the Global Securities Market: Legal and Regulatory Aspects
- Insolvency of Banks: Managing the Risks

== Legal Career ==
Fidelis Oditah was called to the English Bar (Lincoln's Inn) in 1992, served pupillage from January to December 1993 at South Square Chambers and was admitted as a Tenant with effect from 1 January 1994. He has remained a tenant at South Square ever since and became a Queen's Counsel (now King's Counsel) in April 2003, aged thirty-nine. He was appointed a Senior Advocate of Nigeria (SAN) in September 2004. He was elected a Bencher of Lincoln’s Inn, England, in November 2009. According to the Chambers Guide to the UK Legal Profession, “Fidelis Oditah has a huge brain. Whatever he doesn’t know probably isn’t worth knowing”.

Since 2005, Fidelis Oditah has practised law at the English and Nigerian Bars in a broad range of areas. In England, he practices as a chancery and commercial King’s Counsel, with emphasis on arbitration, litigation and advisory services in general commercial law, banking, company, insolvency and restructuring law. In Nigeria, his practice encompasses oil and gas, constitutional and administrative law, banking, company and insolvency law, and general commercial law. He has a substantial litigation practice and a growing local and international commercial and investment arbitration practice as counsel, arbitrator and expert in a broad range of commercial and investment disputes.

== Professional Leadership and Appointments ==
Oditah was the founding president of the International Law Association, Nigeria Branch, serving from 2014 to 2023. He also served as the founding president of the London Court of International Arbitration (LCIA) African Users’ Council, was a member of the LCIA Court, and is a past president of the Business Recovery and Insolvency Practitioners Association of Nigeria (BRIPAN).

== Personal life ==
He is married to Precilla, and they have children.
