= Onicha Olona =

Onicha-Olona
- Location within Nigeria
- Coordinates: 6°22′16.26″N 6°33′59.86″E Ogbe-Obi6°22′39.08″N 6°33′46.60″E Ugbe Royal Qtrs6°22′40.58″N 6°33′53.08″E
- Country: Nigeria
- State: Delta State
- Time zone: UTC+1 (WAT)

Onicha Olona town is a town in Aniocha North, local government area of Delta State, Nigeria. It is a semi-urban community located about 35km northwest of the Delta State capital, Asaba, and approximately 13km North of Issele-Uku town, the headquarters of Aniocha-North LGA.

Onicha Olona is predominantly a Catholic and Anglican community. The traditional religion has lost most of its adherents to Christianity.

It is the epicenter of Ekumeku War

== Notable people ==
- Victor Ochei Former Speaker, Delta State House of Assembly
- Benedict Peters, CEO Aiteo Oil and Gas Inc.

== See also ==
- Anioma people
- Enuani dialect
- Ekumeku Movement (Aniocha, Ndokwa, Ika, Oshimili Movement) which later became Aniocha-North, Ndokwa, Ika, OshiMili, Aniocha-South (A.N.I.O.M.A., an acronym formed in 1951 by Aniocha, Ndokwa, Ika, Oshimili Movement Association led by Late Chief Dennis Osadebe).
