= Stephen R. Perry =

American philosopher

Professor Stephen R. Perry
- Occupation: Law professor
- Title: John J. O'Brien Professor of Law and Professor of Philosophy, and Director of the Institute of Law & Philosophy.

Academic work
- Institutions: University of Pennsylvania Law School
- Main interests: jurisprudence and political philosophy

Stephen R. Perry (born 1950) is a Canadian scholar in the fields of jurisprudence and political philosophy. He is the John J. O'Brien Professor of Law and Professor of Philosophy at the University of Pennsylvania Law School, and Director of the Institute of Law & Philosophy.

== Education and career ==
Perry earned his BA (1975) LLB law degree (1981) at the University of Toronto and his BPhil (1978) and D.Phil. (1988) at Oxford University under the direction of Ronald Dworkin.

He taught for nearly a decade at McGill University prior to moving to Penn in 1996. From 2003 to 2005, he was the Fiorello La Guardia Professor of Law and Professor of Philosophy at NYU Law School.

He is the John J. O'Brien Professor of Law and Professor of Philosophy at the University of Pennsylvania Law School, and Director of the Institute of Law & Philosophy.
