= Gordon Keith Chalmers =

American academic administrator (1904–1956)

- Born: February 7, 1904; Waukesha, Wisconsin, US
- Died: May 8, 1956 (aged 52); Hyannis, Massachusetts
- Occupations: Professor, university president
- Title: President of Kenyon College
- Spouse: Roberta Teale Swartz (m. 1929)
- Children: 4

Academic background
- Education: Brown University (1925); Oxford University (B.A. 1928, M.A. 1934); Harvard University (M.A., PhD 1933)
- Thesis: Sir Thomas Browne's thought and its relation to contemporary ideas (1933)

Academic work
- Discipline: English literature
- Sub-discipline: 17th century English thought and letters
- Institutions: Mount Holyoke College; Rockford College; Kenyon College

Gordon Keith Chalmers (7 February 1904 in Waukesha, Wisconsin – 8 May 1956 in Hyannis, Massachusetts) was a scholar of seventeenth-century English thought and letters, president of Rockford College and Kenyon College, and a national leader in American higher education.

== Early life and education ==
The son of Wiliam Everett Chalmers and his wife Mary Dunklee Maynard, Gordon Chalmers attended Brown University, where he graduated in 1925. Awarded a Rhodes scholarship, he attended Wadham College at Oxford University for three years, earning his bachelor's degree in 1928 and his master's degree in 1934. Returning to the United States, he entered Harvard University, where he earned a master's degree and his Ph.D. in 1933 with a three-volume thesis on "Sir Thomas Browne's thought and its relation to contemporary ideas". On 3 September 1929, he married the poet Roberta Teale Swartz, with whom he had three sons and a daughter.

== Career ==
Chalmers was appointed as an instructor in English at Mount Holyoke College in 1929, and was promoted to assistant professor in 1933. In 1934, he was selected as president of Rockford College and then was later selected as president of Kenyon College in 1937. He remained Kenyon's president until his sudden death at the age of 52.

While at Kenyon, Chalmers was responsible for a remarkable transformation of the College, recruiting for it a wide range of prominent scholars. He developed a close friendship with Robert Frost, who he brought to the college on a number of occasions. This relationship was no doubt aided by the fact that he worked with Lesley Frost Ballantine, Frost's daughter, while at Rockford College. He also had a close association with Kenyon English professor John Crowe Ransom. Among the achievements of Chalmers' administration at Kenyon was the establishment of the Kenyon Review. Through Chalmers, Kenyon also became the birthplace of the Advanced Placement Program of the College Entrance Examination Board.

Chalmers served as vice president of the Franco-American Audio-Visual Distribution Center from 1948 to 1953, and president from 1953 to 1956. He was a member of the National Committee for Fulbright Awards in 1951; chairman of school and college study of admissions with advanced standing from 1951 to 1956, president of the College English Association, 1949–50; president of the Ohio College Association, 1943-45.

== Published works ==
- "Jane Addams" in Prairie Crops: Addresses given at the commencement exercises and the baccalaureate service, June, 1935, edited by J. S. P. Tatlock. Rockford College, Rockford, Ill., 1936, 16-24.
- "Advanced Credit for the School Student." The College Board Review 18 (November 1952): 309-12.
- The College in the Woods. Newcomen Society, 1948.
- "Education Re-Examined." National Book Foundation ([c1955]): [6].
- "Effluvia, the History of a Metaphor." PMLA 52, no. 4 (1937): 1031-50.
- "The Elective System and Chicago." Association of American Colleges Bulletin 28, no. 4 (1943): 576-86.
- "Is There Quackery in Our Schools? Yes, by Gordon K. Chalmers -- No, by Maurice R. Ahrens." Saturday Review of Literature, 12/09 1953.
- "Jane Addams." In Prairie Crops: Addresses Given at the Commencement Exercises and the Baccalaureate Service, June, 1935,' edited by J.S.P. Tatlock, 16-24. Rockford IL: Rockford College, 1936.
- "The Lodestone and the Understanding of Matter in Seventeenth Century England." Philosophy of Science 4 (1937): 75-95.
- The Love of the World. New Haven: The Berkeley Divinity School, 1944.
- A New View of the World. A Discussion of Liberal Education After the War. Denver, Colorado: The Social Science Foundation, University of Denver, 1943.
- "The Place of Letters in Liberal Education. Report of the Commission on Liberal Education of the Association of American Colleges." Association of American Colleges Bulletin 33, no. 4 (December 1947): 1-8.
- "Poetry and General Education." The CEA Critic 10, no. 6 (September 1948): 1-15.
- "The Porcelain Egg, or The Present Interpretation of Education to the Public." In Interpreting Education to the Public. Remarks at the Fourteenth Annual Forum on Education of The Tuition Plan at Hotel Ambassador in New York February 10, 1954., 17-28. New York: The Tuition Plan, 1954.
- "The Prerequisite of Christian Education." American Scholar 16, no. 4 (Autumn 1947): 471-76.
- "The Purpose of Learning." Annals of the American Academy of Political and Social Science September 1955: 7-16.
- "Report of Commission on Liberal Education." Association of American Colleges Bulletin 37, no. 1 (March 1951): 135-40.
- The Republic and the Person: A Discussion of Necessities in Modern American Education. Chicago: Henry Regnery Company, 1952.
- "The Revolutionary Task Ahead: Time for a Change." In The Public Schools in Chrisis; Some Critical Essays, edited by Mortimer Brewster Smith. Chicago: Henry Regnery Co., 1956.
- "Sir Thomas Browne and Hieroglyphs." Virginia Quarterly Autumn 1935.
- "Sir Thomas Browne, True Scientist." Osiris 2, no. 3 (1936): 28-79.
- "The Social Role of Education." On the report of the President's Commission. The American Scholar March 1949: 41-49.
- "Three Terms of the Corpuscularian Philosophy." Modern Philology 33 (1935-1936): 243-60.
- "Time for a Change." In Toward Unity in Education Policy, 13-22. American Council on Education, 1953.
- "To Believe and Doubt Well." Anglican Theological Review 31, no. 1 (January 1949): 9-14.
- "Two Universal Values in a Broad Education." In The Annual Conference on Higher Education in Michigan November 29 and 30, 1950. Addresses and Program., 22-30. University of Michigan Official Publication. Vol. 52, No. 100, June 14, 1951. Ann Arbor, Michigan: The University, 1951.
- A University Bound in a Smaller Volume: An Address to School Students Delivered Over the Columbia Broadcasting System. Gambier, Ohio: Kenyon College, [c1939].
- Wartime College Training Programs of the Armed Services. With Chapters on Special Phases by Sidney L. Pressey, Gordon K. Chalmers, Raymond J. Connolly, and Edward C. Elliott, for the Commission on Implications of Armed Services Educational Programs. Edited by Henry C. Hergé. Washington, DC: American Council on Education, 1948.
- "[Poem]." In St. Nicholas Magazine, edited by Mary Mapes Dodge. New York: Scribner & Company, 1912.

In addition to his published books, he served as editor of the American Oxonian from 1946 to 1948.

== Sources ==
- Thomas Boardman Greenslade, Kenyon College: Its Third Half Century (Gambier, Ohio: Kenyon College, 1975)
- Who's Who
