= Sam Obi =

Nigerian politician and pastor (died 2021)

The Right Honourable Sam Obi

Member representing Ika North East constituency in Delta State house of assembly
- In office 2003–2015

10th Speaker of Delta State house of assembly
- In office 29 July 2010 – 7 June 2011
- Preceded by: Martin Okonta
- Succeeded by: Victor Ochei

Governor of Delta State
- Acting
- In office 10 November 2010 – 10 January 2011
- Preceded by: Emmanuel Uduaghan
- Succeeded by: Emmanuel Uduaghan

Personal details
- Born: Samuel Onyeka Obi; 1961 or 1962 (age 64–65)
- Died: April 3, 2021 (aged 59) Asaba, Delta State, Nigeria
- Cause of death: Undisclosed
- Occupation: Politician; pastor

Samuel Onyeka Obi (1962 – 3 April 2021) was a Nigerian politician who served as acting governor of Delta State between 10 November 2010 and 10 January 2011. He also served as speaker Delta State House of Assembly.

== Career ==
Obi started his political career as a councillor, before becoming a local government chairman in Delta State. During the first term of the former governor of Delta State James Ibori, he served as the chairman, board of directors of The Pointer Newspaper which was owned by the Delta State government. In 2003, he contested and won a seat in the Delta State house of assembly, representing Ika North East and served for three terms which ended in 2015. On 29 July 2010, he was elected as the 10th speaker of Delta State house of assembly to replace the 9th speaker Martin Okonta representing Ika South constituency who was removed by the Court of appeal, Abuja on 12 May 2010.

On 10 November 2010, he became the acting governor of Delta State after the Court of Appeal, Benin annulled the 2007 Delta State gubernatorial election that produced the governor of the state Emmanuel Uduaghan. The Court of Appeal, Benin nullified the election on 9 November 2010 and ordered a re-run within 90 days. On 10 January 2011, Obi handed over to Emmanuel Uduaghan after he won the by-election that was held on 6 January 2011. On 7 June 2011, he was replaced by Victor Ochei representing Aniocha North constituency as the 11th speaker of Delta State house of assembly after he nominated him to replace him. He served as a special adviser in the first term of the governor of Delta State Ifeanyi Okowa and left in 2019.

Later in his life, he founded the Oracle of God Ministries Church, Asaba where he was the general overseer until his death.

== Personal life ==
Obi is from Ibiegwa quarters, Ute-Okpu, Ika North East, Delta State, Nigeria. He was a prince and member of Ute-Okpu royal family. His elder brother HRM Obi Solomon Chukwuka I is the current Obi of Ute-Okpu kingdom.

== Death ==
Obi died on 3 April 2021, at his residence in Asaba, Delta State, Nigeria after a brief illness.
