= This Day =

Nigerian daily English newspaper

THISDAY
- Type: Daily newspaper
- Format: Broadsheet
- Owner: Nduka Obaigbena
- Publisher: Leaders & Company Ltd.
- Founded: 22 January 1995; 31 years ago
- Language: English
- Headquarters: Apapa, Lagos
- Website: www.thisdaylive.com

This Day is a Nigerian national newspaper. It is the flagship newspaper of Leaders & Company Ltd., and was first published on 22 January 1995. It has its headquarters in Apapa, Lagos State. Founded by Nduka Obaigbena, the chairman and editor-in-chief of the This Day Media Group and Arise News.

This Day is a member of the Belt and Road News Network. Since 2014, it has maintained a close relationship with the embassy of the People's Republic of China.

This Day publisher Nduka Obaigbena has previously been criticised for late and non-payment of the paper's staff and suppliers.

== Attacks ==
In 2001, several This Day editors survived a plane crash at Maiduguri airport in North East Nigeria.

In 2012, This Day's offices in the nation's capital Abuja, and in Kaduna were attacked in suicide car bombings thought to have been carried out by terrorist group Boko Haram.

== See also ==
- List of Nigerian newspapers
