= Roberta Teale Swartz =

American poet

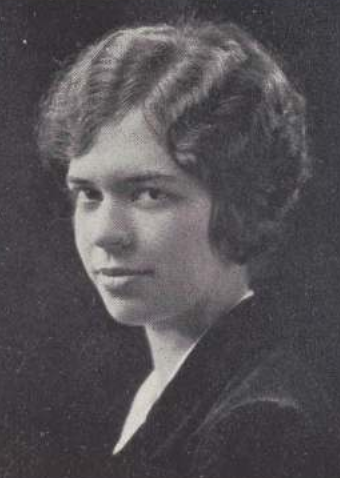
- Roberta Teale Swartz, from the 1925 yearbook of Mount Holyoke College
- Born: June 9, 1903; Brooklyn, New York
- Died: May 13, 1993 (aged 89); Wellesley, Massachusetts
- Occupation: Writer
- Spouse: Gordon Keith Chalmers

Roberta Teale Swartz Chalmers (9 June 1903 in Brooklyn, New York – 13 May 1993 in Wellesley, Massachusetts) was an American academic, a poet, and co-founder of the Kenyon Review.

== Early life and education ==
The daughter of William King Swartz and his wife Carrie Teale, Swartz attended Mount Holyoke College, where she took her Bachelor of Arts degree in 1925 magna cum laude. After obtaining her Master of Arts degree at Radcliffe College, Harvard University in 1926, she went on to Oxford University, where she obtained her B.Litt. degree in 1929. On 3 September 1929, she married Gordon Keith Chalmers, with whom she had three sons and a daughter.

== Academic career ==
Roberta Teale's first appointment was as an English teacher at Bancroft School, Worcester, Massachusetts in 1926-27. From there, she went on to become instructor in English at Mount Holyoke College, and was promoted to assistant professor in 1931. She left Mount Holyoke in 1934 on her husband's selection as president of Rockford College, where she served as associate professor of English. On his selection as president of Kenyon College in 1937, she eventually served as associate professor there in 1942-45. In 1937, Mount Holyoke College awarded her a D.Litt. degree. While at Kenyon, she became a major influence in the establishment of the Kenyon Review in 1939 and served as an advisor to its first editor John Crowe Ransom.

After her husband's death in 1956, she was appointed visiting lecturer at Wellesley College in 1956-57, and then she was appointed associate professor of English at Queens College, Charlotte, North Carolina, from 1959 to 1968.

== Published works ==
- Lilliput New York : Harcourt, Brace, 1926.
- Lord Juggler & other poems New York: Harper, 1932
- Mount Holyoke College hundred year poems 1937

== Unpublished works ==
- Clarastella by Robert Heath (fl. 1636-59), edited, introduction and notes by Roberta Teale Swartz. Mount Holyoke archives
