= Afren =

British company

Afren Plc
- Trade name: Afren
- Type: Public limited company
- Traded as: LSE: AFR
- Industry: Oil and gas
- Founded: 2004; 22 years ago
- Founder: Ethelbert Cooper
- Defunct: 2015
- Fate: administration
- Headquarters: London, United Kingdom
- Revenue: $1,644.3 million (2013)
- Operating income: $491.0 million (2013)
- Net income: $474.8 million (2013)
- Website: www.afren.com

Afren plc was an international independent oil exploration and production company. It was formerly listed on the London Stock Exchange, however it was de-listed in 2015. The company was placed in administration in July 2015.

== History ==
The company was founded in 2004 by the Europe-based West African entrepreneur Ethelbert Cooper, with assistance from the former OPEC president and secretary general Rilwanu Lukman, as an exploration and production company focused on Africa. Most of Afren's production is in Nigeria.

After the initial public offering in March 2005, Afren rapidly expanded its portfolio across six countries: Nigeria, São Tomé & Príncipe JDZ, Gabon, Republic of the Congo, Côte d'Ivoire, Ghana and Iraqi Kurdistan.

In March 2015, Afren reported lenders approved a three-month payment deferral for a $300 million debt facility. Afren said it won a payment deferral for a $50 million amortization payment for a $300 million Ebok debt facility that was due 31 January.

On 4 March 2015 Afren defaulted on its 2016 bonds after refusing to make a $15 million interest payment in order to preserve cash for an ongoing capital structure review.

In April 2015, Afren appointed Alan Linn its new chief executive, following the sacking of CEO Osman Shahenshah, along with chief operating officer Shahid Ullah over allegations of unauthorised bonus payments to themselves by an Afren joint venture partner.

On 15 July 2015, Afren shares were suspended after its failure to raise enough funds to continue operating, and reduced production levels.

On 16 July 2015 about 130 small shareholders wrote to the Financial Conduct Authority to investigate demanding a "full and prompt regulatory investigation" into Afren's conduct.

On 31 July 2015 Afren plc released a corporate update announcing that, having failed to secure refinancing, the board of the company would file papers to put the organisation into administration. AlixPartners were appointed as administrators.

On 10 August 2015 the company was delisted from the London Stock Exchange.

In September 2015 stakeholders criticized Blackstone's involvement in Afren Administration. Concerns were raised over a potential conflict of interest in the process for winding up Afren.

A suit was filed by Petroleum Zion Exploration and Production Ltd, at the Federal High Court, Lagos, claiming that the company interfered with their transaction to purchase Afren's stake in Oil Mining Lease ("OML") 26. The plaintiff was also seeking $230 million as damages against PJT Partners UK for disclosing its sensitive information to competitors and an additional $8.94 million as compensation for expenses it incurred as a result of the defendants’ bad faith.

On 27 October 2015, a Financial Times article reported on estimates that the sale of Afren's assets would raise only $200 million, leaving $1.7 billion of outstanding debt.

In September 2017, Afren's former chief executive Osman Shahenshah and chief operating officer Shahid Ullah appeared at Westminster Magistrates' Court charged with money laundering and fraud, after a two-year investigation by the Serious Fraud Office. Upon being found guilty Shahenshah was sentenced to 6 years for fraud, 6 years for money laundering and 4 years on another count of money laundering concurrently, and Ullah to 5 years for fraud, 5 years for money laundering and 4 years on another count of money laundering concurrently, as well as being banned from acting as company directors for 14 years.

In May 2017, it was reported that the administrators of Afren PLC, AlixPartners UK, had been seeking access to funds, which had originally been meant for an environmental clean-up in Nigeria, so they could be given to bondholders.

In July 2020 the Serious Fraud Office issued a confiscation order for over £5.4 million against Osman Shahenshah and Shahid Ullah.

== Operations ==
The group in 2009 produced circa 22,000 barrels (3,500 m^{3}) of oil equivalent per day from its then-current portfolio.

Okoro Setu Fields (OML 112)

The Okoro Field ("Okoro") and Setu Field ("Setu") are two oil fields located in OML 112 in shallow water offshore Nigeria, which were originally awarded to Amni - a well established indigenous oil company - in 1993 as part of the Nigerian government's indigenous licensing programme. First oil was achieved during June 2008 when production from the first two production wells drilled commenced at a rate in excess of 3,000 barrels (480 m^{3}) of oil per day from each well. A further five wells were subsequently drilled, completed and brought onstream. The wells drilled were a mixture of horizontal and highly deviated penetrations of the reservoir intervals. The field is currently producing at a rate of 22,000 bbl/d (3,500 m^{3}/d) from all seven wells.

Ebok

Ebok is an undeveloped oil field located in OML 67, 50 km offshore in 135 ft (41 m) of water in Nigeria's prolific south-eastern producing area. The field was discovered by the ExxonMobil / NNPC JV in 1968 (M-QQ1 (Ebok-1)), and two subsequent appraisal wells were drilled in 1970 (Ebok-2 and Ebok-3). First oil was originally targeted in H2 2010 but was subsequently pushed back to February 2011.
