= Victor Ochei =

Nigerian politician (born 1969)

- Onyekachi

Personal details
- Born: 25 February 1969 (age 57) Kano State, Nigeria
- Party: People's Democratic Party (Nigeria)
- Education: University of Benin; Chemical Engineering
- Website: www.victorochei.ng

Victor Ochei Onyekachi (born 25 February 1969) is a former member of the Nigerian House of Assembly from Ogbekenu in Onicha Olona, Delta State. He was a former Speaker of the Delta State House of Assembly on 6 June 2011, representing the Aniocha North constituency, marking the commencement of the Fifth Assembly of the Delta State Legislature. He held the position of Primus Inter Pares of the Delta State Assembly for two years and nine months before his resignation on 18 March 2014.

== Personal life ==
Victor Ochei Onyekachi was born on 25 February 1969, in Kano State and hails from Onicha Olona in the Aniocha North Local Government Area of Delta State. He attended the Methodist Primary School and St. Thomas Secondary School in Kano and then proceeded to the University of Benin in Benin City, where he graduated with a bachelor's degree in chemical engineering. He then completed the mandatory one-year National Youth Service in Ondo State.

Ochei has obtained certificates in good governance, effective legislation, and improving secondary school education from different prestigious institutions including Oxford University, the University of California, and the Harvard Graduate School of Education. He obtained a law degree from Delta State University, earned an MBA degree in 1996. and is also a fellow at the Institute of African Studies (IAS) at the University of Nigeria, Nsukka.

Ochei moved to Asaba, the capital of Delta State where he then began his career in business by printing calendars and other memorabilia. He later founded DavNotch Nigeria Limited, an engineering consultation firm. In 2011, Ochei earned the Fellowship of the Nigerian Society of Engineers (FNSE) for his contributions to the practice and development of engineering in the country.

== Political career ==
In 2003, Ochei emerged the representative of Aniocha North Constituency and later, Deputy Minority Leader of the Delta State House of Assembly, on the platform of the United Nigerian People's Party (UNPP); a position held till 2006.

In his second bid for elective office, he opted for the People's Democratic Party (PDP) and got re-elected on the party's platform into the State Legislature. He became Chairman of the House Committee on Education until the end of the Fourth Assembly of the Delta State Legislature. He contested the 26 April 2011 election and was re-elected to the state legislature for a third term.

During his three consecutive tenures as the Representative of the Aniocha North Constituency in the Delta State House of Assembly, Ochei has led many educational and infrastructural development projects within the area. One of the projects among these initiatives was the renovation, modernisation, and provision of educational aids for 19 basic, secondary, and tertiary institutions in the Aniocha North Constituency.

He was elected by his colleagues as Speaker of the Delta State House of Assembly (DTHA), serving for 2 years and 9 months (6 June 2011 to 18 March 2014) making him the longest serving Speaker in the history of the Delta State Assembly. As a member of the house, he was elected three times as the representative of the Aniocha North constituency.

== Awards ==
Ochei received various awards, including Awards of Excellence from organisations such as the Delta State House of Assembly (DTHA), the Nigerian Union of Journalists (NUJ), and an "Award of Merit" presented by the Interparty Advisory Council of Nigeria (Delta State Chapter).

As State Assembly Speaker, Ochei is the longest-serving Speaker in the history of the Delta State House of Assembly (DTHA).

He has received awards from Anioma Trends: Legislator of the Year in 2011–2012; Warri Development Platform: Best Speaker in Nigeria; Exceptional International Magazine: Exceptional Speaker of the Year; and was nominated for State Assembly Speaker of the Year 2013 for the Nigerian Legislative Excellence Awards.

During the 2011 National Engineering Conference and Annual General Meeting at Tinapa Business Resort, Calabar, he was awarded the Distinguished Fellow Nigerian Society of Engineers (FNSE) award, making him the youngest Nigerian engineer to attain such an award.

Victor Ochei is also recognized for his educational achievements, focusing on inspiring and equipping young people with the tools for success. Some of the awards received in this category include the National Association of Nigeria Students (NANS) Meritorious Service Award, the Award of Excellence, the Fellowship of the Institute of African Studies at the University of Nigeria, Nsukka; and the Worldwide Distinguished Alumni Award from the University of Benin Alumni Association (UBAA), which was presented at the 41st Founder's Day Anniversary.

He has received an award for excellence from the Ogwashi-Uku Youth Development Association, been voted Patron of the Youth Sports Federation of Nigeria (Delta State), and been named Grand Patron of the Nigerian Wheelchair Basketball Federation (NWBF).

== Philanthropy ==
Ochei is a patron of the Nigerian Wheelchair Basketball Federation and chairman of the Delta State Wrestling Association. In community service, Ochei is a donor to Rotary International and a member of the De Saints International Club. He also facilitated the donation of brand new buses to all the secondary schools in Aniocha North LGA, donation of books to schools in Aniocha North and donation of books to Delta State University, Abraka.
