= Hanks Anuku =

Nigerian actor

Anuku Hank Henry
- Born: 12 May 1960 (age 66)
- Education: Auchi Polytechnic
- Occupation: Actor

TikTok information
- Page: hankhenry
- Followers: 3

Henry "Hanks" Anuku (born 12 May 1960) is a Nigerian actor. He often stars as a villain in many Nollywood films.

== Life and education ==
He attended Loyola College, Ibadan, the capital city of Oyo State, southwest Nigeria. He graduated from Auchi Polytechnic in 1981. He Ika, Igbo, from Delta State, south-south Nigeria. His sister was Miss Nigeria 1986 Rita Anuku, who died in 2015.

== Acting career ==
His acting career started in the 1990s, alongside other popular Nigerian actors like Gentle Jack. With his tough-guy roles, and unique accent and talent, he gradually established himself as a highly sought after actor in Nollywood, starring in many movies.

- "FILMOGRAPHY"
- Desperadoes (2001)
- She Devil (2001)
- Broad Daylight (2001) as Johnny
- Wanted Alive (2001)
- My Love (2002)
- Formidable force (2002) as Bill
- Player: Mr Lover Man (2003)
- Twin Brothers (2003)
- Unforgettable (2003)
- Accidental Discharge (2003)
- "Gang leader (2004)"
- Blood Diamonds (2004)
- Bitter Honey (2005)
- Save the child (2005)
- The Captor (2006) as Lynx
- Desperate Ambition (2006) as Bosco
- Men on Hard Way (2007) as Jones
- Fools on the Run (2007)
- Rambo
- The senator 1 and 2
- Azubuike
- Amnesty (2011) as Pere
- Swagger Babes (2012) as Byron
- Merciful Heart (2016) as King of Cannibal
- Aki and Pawpaw (2021) as Chief Priest
