= Anne M. Lofaso =

American lawyer

Anne Marie Lofaso
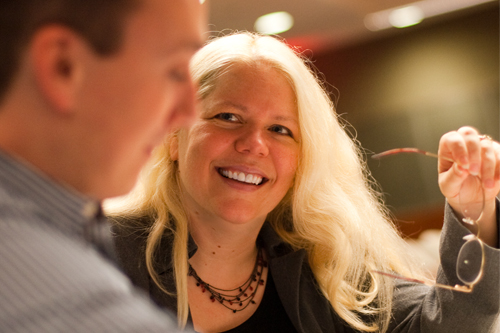
- Born: October 23, 1965 (age 60)
- Spouse: Jim Heiko

Academic background
- Education: Somerville College, Oxford; University of Pennsylvania Law School; Harvard College

Academic work
- Discipline: Labor law, employment law
- Institutions: University of Cincinnati; West Virginia University

Anne Marie Lofaso (born October 23, 1965) is a professor of law at the University of Cincinnati College of Law, and the former Associate Dean for Faculty Research and Development and a professor at the West Virginia College of Law. In 2010, she was named WVU College of Law Professor of the Year. She is also a four-time recipient of the WVU College of Law faculty-scholarship award.

== Academic career ==
Lofaso studied at Somerville College, Oxford for her DPhil in Law. In 1996, Lofaso served as a lecturer for St. Hugh's College, University of Oxford, where she gave tutorials to law students in British labour law and employment discrimination law. In August 2001, Lofaso began teaching comparative and international work law and appellate advocacy as an adjunct professor at American University Washington College of Law. Later, she moved into full-time academia as an associate professor and was promoted to professor in 2011. Dean Joyce McConnell appointed Lofaso to the position of Associate Dean for Faculty Research and Development, effective July 1, 2011. In early 2011, Lofaso became a researcher for the Employment Policy Research Network. In 2015, Lofaso was appointed a leadership research fellow in Arts and Humanities at the Office of the Associate Vice President for Creative and Scholarly Activity at West Virginia University. She returned to Oxford University as a Senior Academic Visitor with the Faculty of Law and as a Keeley Visiting Fellow to Wadham College, University of Oxford for the 2016 academic year. While at Oxford, she worked on a labor law monograph, The Once and Future Worker. Additionally, she is the "Arthur B. Hodges Professor of Law," an endowed chair at West Virginia University, College of Law. In 2025, she became a professor at the University of Cincinnati College of Law.

== Lofaso's Theory of Work Law: The Autonomous Dignified Worker ==
Lofaso has spent the past fifteen years developing a jurisprudential basis for workers' rights. In her view, workers' rights must be grounded in two values: autonomy and dignity. In her first tenure piece, Toward a Foundational Theory of Workers' Rights: The Autonomous Dignified Worker, published in the University of Missouri Law Review, Lofaso began to build that foundational theory. Lofaso draws on Raz's theory of autonomy—to become part author of one's life—and on Dworkin's theory of dignity to argue that workplace laws should reflect those values. In Lofaso's view, although government is typically the most coercive force in most people's lives, the accumulation of private power is a close second. Accordingly, the law should play a role in protecting workers from those coercive forces (thereby promoting the autonomy and dignity of working-class people) by encouraging concerted activities for the purpose of mutual aid. The practice of collective bargaining is, for example, one way of liberating the working and middle classes. Lofaso continues that theme in a recent article, In Defense of Public Sector Unions, published in the Hofstra Law Review. There she defends the role that public and private-sector unions play not only in liberating the working classes, but also in educating working-class people in how to be model citizens who can participate in a democracy. By contrast, Lofaso views the accumulation of economic power in the private sector as threatening a well-functioning democracy.

In September Massacre, a white paper published by the American Constitution Society for Law and Policy, and a recent article, The Persistence of Union Repression in an Era of Recognition, published in the Maine Law Review, Lofaso continues the theme of government and private sources of coercing working-class people. Lofaso exposes the coercive force of government, which she contends has narrowed the rights of working people in the post-New-Deal era in partial response to the pressure exerted by the private sector. Lofaso continues that theme in her article, The Vanishing Employee, published by the Florida International Law Review, by showing how each branch of government has contributed to eroding workers' rights primarily by narrowing the statutory definition of protected employees.

== Family ==
Lofaso is married to Jim Heiko, a statistician. She is also the great-granddaughter of the American playwright and composer, George M. Cohan.

== Publications ==
=== Books ===
- Modern Labor Law in the Public and Private Sectors: Cases and Materials (Lexis Publishing, forthcoming 2012) (with S. Harris, J. Slater, and D. Gregory)
- Reversing Field: Examining Commercialization, Labor, Gender, and Race in 21st Century Sports Law (with andré douglas pond cummings) (West Virginia University Press 2010)
- A Practitioner's Guide to Appellate Advocacy (ABA Publishing 2010)
- Religion in the Public Schools: A Road Map for Avoiding Lawsuits and Respecting Parents' Legal Rights (Americans United for Separation of Church and State 2009)

=== Selected Scholarly Articles ===
- In Defense of Public Sector Unions, 28 HOFSTRA LAB. L. J. 303 (2011)
- What We Owe Our Coal Miners, 5 HARV. L. & POL'Y REV. 87 (2011), available at https://ssrn.com/abstract=1792859
- Promises, Promises: Assessing the Obama Administration's Record on Labor Reform, 20 NEW LABOR FORUM 65 (2011)
- The Vanishing Employee: Putting the Autonomous Dignified Union Worker Back To Work, 5 FIU L. REV. 497 (2010) (solicited article for law review symposium: Whither the Board? The National Labor Relations Act at 75), available at https://ssrn.com/abstract=1797984
- Talking Is Worthwhile: The Role of Employee Voice in Protecting, Enhancing and Encouraging Individual Rights to Job Security in a Collective System (A Tribute to Clyde Summers), 14 Employee Rights & Employment Pol'y J. 55 (2010), available at https://ssrn.com/abstract=1558563&download=yes
- Calling for Comparative and Interdisciplinary Study of Coal Mine Safety, Administrative & Regulatory Law News (ABA Publishing Fall 2010)
- Did Congress Authorize the NLRB To Decide Cases with only Two Sitting Board Members, Where the NLRA's Statutory Language Provides for a Three-Member Board Quorum? 37 Supreme Court Preview 259 (ABA Publishing March 2010)
- The Relevance of the Wagner Act for Resolving Today's Job-Security Crisis, Labor and Employment Relations Association Proceedings of the 62nd Annual Meeting (2010)
- The Persistence of Union Repression in an Era of Recognition, 62 ME. L. REV. 199 (2010), available at https://ssrn.com/abstract=1449552
- Approaching Coal Mine Safety from a Comparative Law and Interdisciplinary Perspective, 111 W.V. L. REV. 1 (2008), available at https://ssrn.com/abstract=993830
- September Massacre: The Latest Battle in the War on Workers' Rights Under the National Labor Relations Act (2008), https://web.archive.org/web/20110927205919/http://www.acslaw.org/files/ACS%20September%20Massacre.pdf, available at https://ssrn.com/abstract=1133607; reprinted in A Fresh Start for a New Administration: Reforming Law and Justice Policies (American Constitution Society for Law and Policy 2008)
- Toward a Foundational Theory of Workers' Rights: The Autonomous Dignified Worker, 76 U.M.K.C. L. REV. 1 (2007), available at https://ssrn.com/abstract=975040
- Does Changing the Definition of Science Solve the Establishment Clause Problem of Teaching Intelligent Design as Science in Public Schools: Doing an End-run Around the Constitution, 4 PIERCE L. REV. 219 (2006), available at https://ssrn.com/abstract=890083
- The Constitutional Debate over Teaching Intelligent Design as Science in Public Schools, December 2005, https://web.archive.org/web/20120204102924/http://www.acslaw.org/pdf/Intelligent_Design_White_Paper.pdf
- Bush Appointee Strikes down Dover ID Policy as Unconstitutional, December 21, 2005, https://web.archive.org/web/20090421182318/http://www.acsblog.org/cat-guest-bloggers.html
- Pre-termination Job Rights of British Workers Affected by Collective Redundancies, [1996] YEARBOOK OF EUROPEAN LAW 277 (Clarendon Press, Oxford University Press, 1997)
- Pregnancy and Parental Care Policies in the European Community and the United States: What Do They Tell Us About Underlying Societal Values? 12 COMP. LAB. L.J. 458 (1991)
- America's Reception to Darwin's Theory of Evolution by Natural Selection, vol. 5 Synthesis, the undergraduate journal in the history and philosophy of science (1986) (journal ceased with vol. 6, no. 3 (summer 1987))
