= Ika North East =

- LGA
- Interactive map of Ika North East
- Country: Nigeria
- State: Delta State
- Headquarters: Owa Oyibu

Area
  - Total: 463 km^{2} (179 sq mi)

Population (2006)
  - Total: 183,657
  - Density: 397/km^{2} (1,030/sq mi)
- Time zone: UTC+1 (WAT)
- Postal code: 321

Ika North East is a Local Government Area of Delta State, Nigeria. Its headquarters are in the town of Owa Oyibu.

It has an area of 463 km^{2} and a population of 183,657 at the 2006 census.

- It is also a kingdom which is known as Ekwuoma Kingdom, ruled by a 23-year-old king, Prince Daniel, who became the 11th Ajeh (King)

The postal code of the area is 321.

== Cities, towns and communities ==
1. Achara
2. Agban
3. Akpama
4. Ekwuoma is a town with this quarters ...odopo, umuosi, idumute, oduga, idumuech....long live Ekwuoma
5. Akumazi
6. Aliegbo
7. Alilor
8. Aliobume
9. Aliojeh
10. Alugba
11. Aniekpukwu
12. Anieyime
13. Aninwachokor
14. Ase
15. Boji-Boji-Owa
16. Eje
17. Etiti
18. Ibiegwa
19. Idumuigwe
20. Idumuobior
21. Idumuozeh
22. Idum-Ile
23. Idumu-Oba
24. Idumu-Obi
25. Idumu-Ukpa
26. Idumu-Uleje
27. Idumu-Uzougbo
28. Ikeze
29. Illabor
30. Imike
31. Isaiah Camp
32. Isiube
33. Itamuzun
34. Mbiri - Mbiri is a town bordered by Umunede, Emuhu, Oligie and Ekpun. It is estimated to have about 50,000 people in population. The vast majority of population is subsistence farmers. The title given to the traditional ruler is Obi. The traditional ruler of Mbiri is His Royal Highness Obi Ifeanyi Alekwe JP.
35. Mbiri Farm Settlement
36. Ndobu
37. Obgute
38. Obi
39. Obi-Quarter
40. Obume
41. Oduga
42. Ogbe
43. Ogbe-Akpu
44. Ogbe-Obi
45. Okete
46. Orji
47. Otolokpo
48. Owa-Alero
49. Owa-Alidinma
50. Owa-Aliozomor
51. Owa-Ekei
52. Owa-Ofie
53. Owa-Oyibu LGA headquarters
54. Owanta-Idumuetor
55. Owerre-Olubor
56. Ugbeka
57. Umuagboma
58. Umuhu
59. Umukpulu
60. Umunede
61. Ute
62. Ute-Alohen
63. Ute-Enugu
64. Ute-Erumu
65. Ute-Owerri

== Notable people ==
- Sam Obi, Ex-speaker and former acting governor of Delta State
- Ifeanyi Okowa, former Governor of Delta State, Nigeria (2015 - 2023) and former Senator of the Federal Republic of Nigeria
