= Social Insurance Institute =

The logo of the Social Insurance Institute.

The Social Insurance Institute (Greek: Ίδρυμα Κοινωνικών Ασφαλίσεων, IKA) was the largest, state based, social security organization in Greece: its beneficiaries were 5,530,000 members of the Greek employed population and 830,000 pensioners. It was established in 1934 with first director Panagiotis Kanellopoulos. A common myth in Greece is that it was created by the Metaxas regime (1936–1941), however in reality it was its function that began in 1937 while the establishment had already happened in 1934.

It maintained its own units for health service until 2012, when they were absorbed by EOPYY.

On 1 January 2017 was absorbed by EFKA, an organization which absorbed different social security funds.

== Financial position ==
The IKA suffers from chronic financial difficulties. In 2009, it had to be supported by the state with 2.6 billion euros. However, press reports describing the IKA as a "black hole" whose collapse is imminent are denied.

Many pension frauds, which were uncovered in 2011, are regarded as one of the causes of the financial situation: After it was noticed that pensions were being transferred to over 9,000 pensioners over the age of 100, all pensioners had to report for personal identification. This revealed that 63,500 had died - some long ago - and that around 7 to 8 billion euros had been paid to relatives of the deceased in the last ten years. Furthermore, the Greek pension funds suffered heavy losses as a result of the haircut carried out to deal with the financial crisis, since they had invested around 8 billion euros in Greek government bonds. Because of the financial crisis, the Greek state has also frozen subsidies to hospitals and insurance companies. In the meantime, unpaid invoices for around two billion euros have accumulated, so that suppliers only supply state clinics against payment in advance and pharmacies only sell medicines against cash payment.

== See also ==
- Healthcare in Greece
