= Nduka Obaigbena =

Nigerian media executive

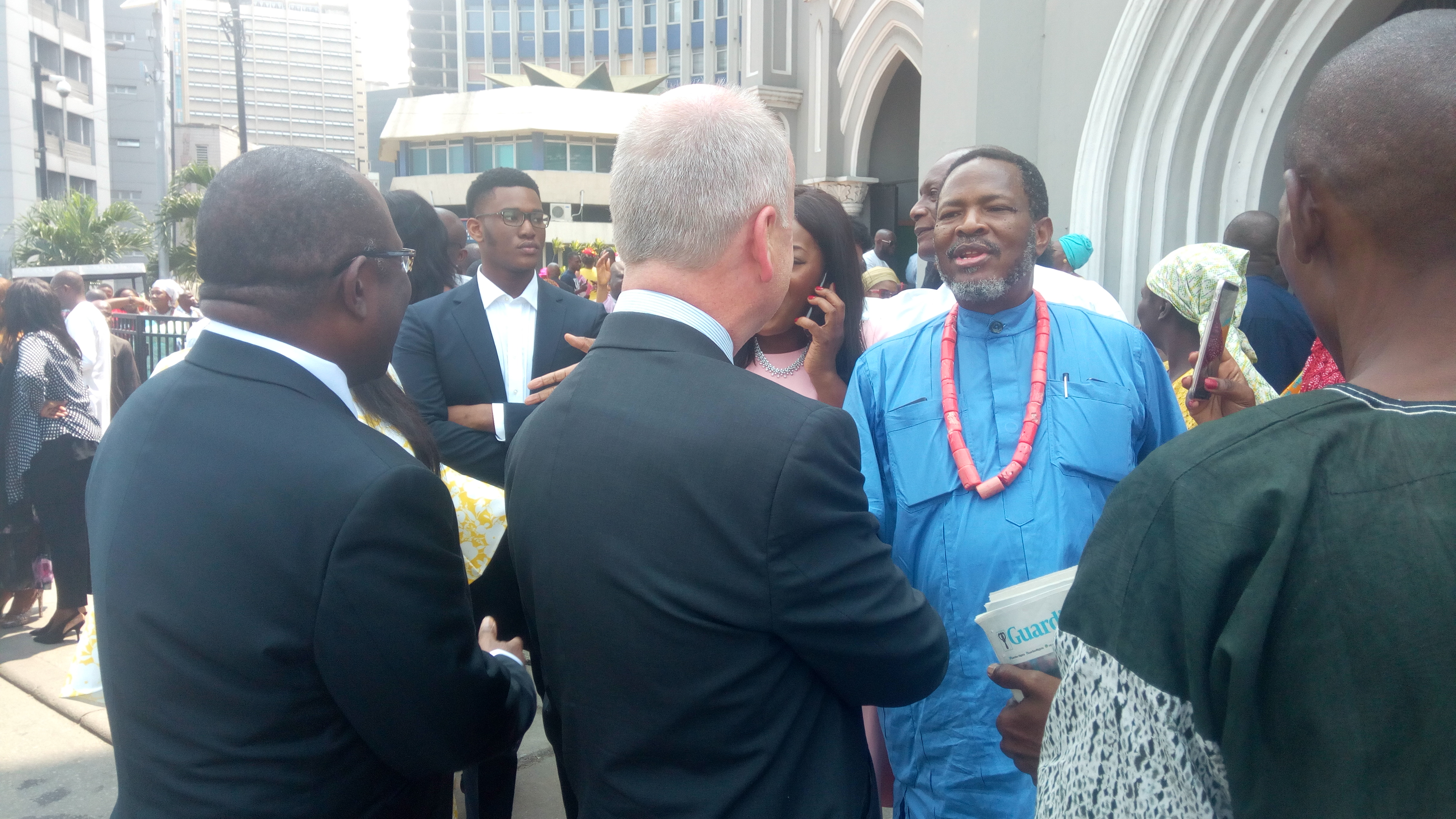
- Nduka Obaigbena at his 60th Birthday thanksgiving at the Cathedral Church of Christ, Lagos
- Born: 14 July 1959 (age 67); Ibadan, Western Region, Nigeria Place of Birth: Igbanke in Edo State
- Organization(s): Leaders and Company Limited, Delta State
- Known for: Publisher, ThisDay Newspaper, Chairman, Arise News Channel

Nduka Obaigbena CON, Duke of Owa kingdom is a Nigerian media mogul who is the founding Chairman and Editor-in-Chief of the THISDAY Media Group and ARISE News Channel.

== Background ==
He was born in Ibadan, South West, Nigeria on July 14, 1959, into the royal family of Owa Kingdom, Delta State.

=== Education ===
Obaigbena attended Edo College, Benin City, and the University of Benin. He attended the Graduate School of Business at the University of the Witwatersrand, Johannesburg, and the Advanced Management Programme at the University of Cape Town.

== Career ==
He founded the Nigerian newspaper Thisday in 1995. In 2000 Obaigbena founded the annual Thisday Awards which honor those who made contributions to Nigerian society in the political arena, global business, Women of distinction, and leading figures in the Nigerian education sector.

In 2013 he launched an international TV news channel with an African focus, Arise News, signing a contract with Globecast for satellite transmission on Astra 2G for broadcast on the UK Sky platform, and to Hot Bird for cable distribution, with bases in London, New York City, Johannesburg, Abuja, and Lagos.

In 2021, Obaigbena was disqualified from serving as a company director in the UK for seven years; judge Raquel Agnello, ruling in favour of a case brought by the official receiver, found his conduct as sole director of Arise TV to be unfit and that the company had continued to trade despite "complete uncertainty" about its funding.

=== Politics ===
Obaigbena was a senate candidate in 1991. He was elected a member of the Constitutional Conference in 1994.

=== International boards and Committees ===
Obaigbena is a regular attendee and sessions moderator for the World Economic Forum and has served as a member of the Nominating Committee of the Young Global Leaders of the World Economic Forum. He is Chairman of the Newspaper Proprietors’ Association of Nigeria (NPAN) as well as Chairman of the Nigerian Press Organisation - comprising the NPAN, the National Union of Journalists and the Nigerian Guild of Editors where he is a fellow.

=== ThisDay ===
Obaigbena began the publication of the Thisday Nigerian newspaper in 1995. In 2000 he founded the annual Thisday Awards which honours those who made contributions to Nigerian society in the political arena, global business, Women of distinction, and leading figures in the Nigerian education sector.

=== Arise News ===
In 2013 he launched an international TV news channel with an African focus, Arise News, signing a contract with Globecast for satellite transmission on Astra 2G for broadcast on the UK Sky platform, and to Hot Bird for cable distribution, with bases in London, New York City, Johannesburg, and Lagos.

=== ARISE Magazine and ARISE Fashion Week ===
He also founded ARISE Magazine. The publication was launched at the THISDAY Music & Fashion Festival at London's Royal Albert Hall on October 14, 2008 and powered The ARISE (AFRICA ) FASHION Week starting in Johannesburg and Cape Town, South Africa, and later finding a home in Lagos Nigeria - after shows with the African Fashion Collectives in the Royal Albert Hall, London; Kennedy Centre, Washington DC; Lincoln Centre, New York. The ARISE Fashion Week also featured a few years at The New York and Paris Fashion Weeks.

=== Cultural Initiatives ===
Obaigbena started the THISDAY Music and Fashion Festivals in 2006. The event included several musical acts such as Beyonce, Jay Z, Rihanna, John Legend, Lionel Richie, Dianna Ross, Alicia Keys, Mary J Blige, Snoop Dogg, 50 Cent, Busta Rhyme, Black Eyed Peas, Missy Elliott, Usher, Naomi Campbell, Alec Wek, Liya Kedebe, Oluchi, etc. He also created the concept of THISDAY Awards.

== Controversy ==
Before the ascent of Arise News, some staff and suppliers complained about Obaigbena's failure to meet payment deadlines. Obaigbena had paid all debts to employees. About three years after the launching of Arise News, Obaigbena was involved in an inquiry being conducted by Nigeria's Economic and Financial Crimes Commission, which was investigating the spending of a $2.1 billion fund. The ensuing course of investigations affected Obaigbena's operations. About this period, staff complained and took job action because of the delay in payments.

== Awards ==
In October 2022, Commander of the Order of the Niger (CON), a Nigerian national award was conferred on Obaigbena by President Muhammadu Buhari.
