= Igbodo =

Town in Delta State, Nigeria

Coordinates: 6.3°N 6.370°E

Igbodo is a town located in Delta State, Nigeria.
