= Arise News =

World news channel

Arise News is a Nigerian world news channel. It has studios in Abuja and Lagos. The channel features international content with a focus on Africa. It is operated by Arise Broadcasting Ltd., which is owned by Nigerian media mogul Nduka Obaigbena.

As of October 2017, Arise News is available on Channel 416 on DStv and channel 24 on GOTV in Nigeria. As of June 2020, Arise News can be found on broadcast Freeview via its own service on Channel 269 and as part of the Visiontv. line-up on Channel 264.

Arise also runs a second channel on visiontv. called Live 360. This channel is more focused on entertainment with fashion shows similar to the ones on FashionTV and Edgy TV, and sport, with greyhound racing broadcast on the channel until 2021 (when Sporty Stuff HD on Freesat channel 250 took over the rights).

On 9 February 2022, the company rebranded Live 360 as Arise Play, the same name as the company's Nigerian streaming platform. The Arise Play service was launched in 2021 and has a number of titles from BBC Studios in its catalogue, with productions such as Luther, Small Axe, Famalam, The First Team, Britain: A Forgotten History and Hey Duggee available to Nigerian subscribers.
