= Ika language (Nigeria) =

Igboid language spoken by the Ika people of Nigeria

Ika
- Region: Delta and Edo, Nigeria
- Ethnicity: Ika people
- Native speakers: (560,000 cited 2000)
- Language family: Niger–Congo?: Atlantic-Congo; Volta–Congo; Volta–Niger; yeai; Nuclear Igboid; Ika

Language codes
- ISO 639-3: ikk
- Glottolog: ikaa1238

The Ika language is an Igboid language, classified under Nuclear Igboid in the Yeai language family.

The language is spoken primarily by the Ika people of Delta and Edo states of southern Nigeria.

More specifically, the Ika people are in the North-West of Delta State; but some, like Igbanke, Inyelen and Ekpon, are currently in Edo State. Ika communities mostly comprise the following: Agbor, Owa, Umunede, Mbiri, Abavo, Orogodo, Otolokpo, Igbodo, Ute-Okpu, Ute-Ugbeje, Idumuesah, Akumazi, Ekpon, Igbanke, Inyelen, Iru Egbede (Delta State).

Other Ika-speaking communities found in Edo State are Owanikeke, Owa-Riuzo Idu, Igbogili, Ute Oheze, Oghada, Otobaye I & II, Ogan and Ute Obagie N’Oheze. On Delta Radio there is now news in the Ika language. A similar program is also aired on Edo Broadcasting Service (EBS) Radio, where it is called Igbanke Request, named after the most popular Ika-speaking town in Edo State. Ikas have started to write the Bible in their language, and the gospels of Mark, Luke, Matthew and John have been published in Ika along with other books. Ifeanyi Okowa is a prominent son of Ika background.

== Ika phonological comparisons ==
A concise phonological juxtaposition among three distinct Ika dialects.

English	Akumuzi (North-East) dialect of Ika	Owa (North South) dialect of Ika	Agbor (South) dialect of Ika
‘cloth’	akwa	ekwa	ekwa
'paper'	akuwo	ekukwo	ehuhwo
‘chewing stick’	atu	etu	etu
‘sponge’	elu	eru	eru
'sweet'	uso	uso	uswo
