= Olukumi people =

Olukumi
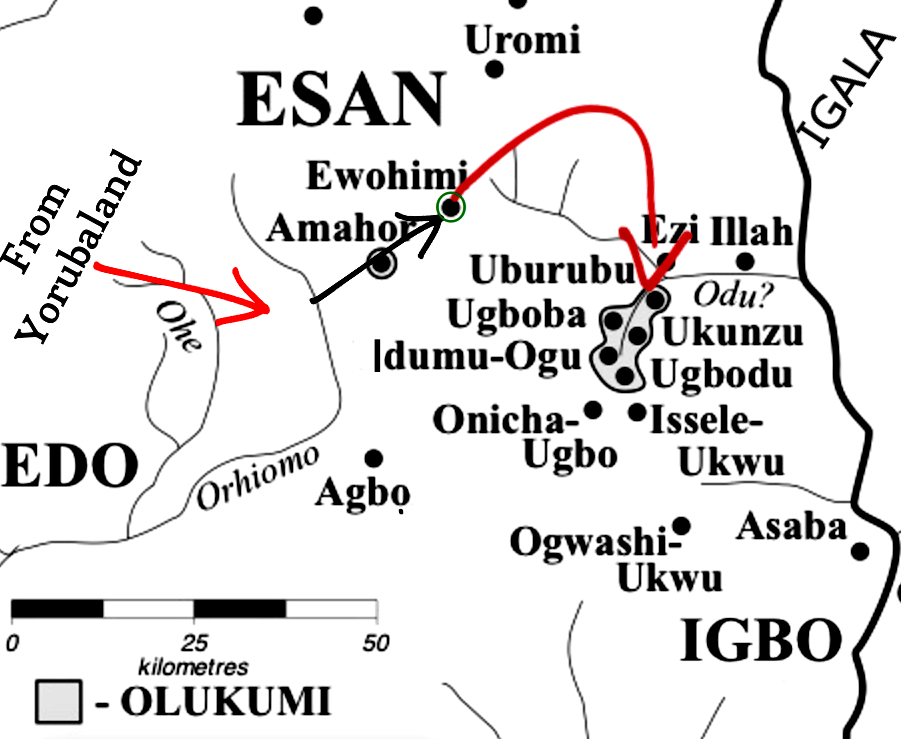
- Migration pattern of the Olukumi

Total population
- Unknown

Regions with significant populations
- Aniocha North, Delta State, Igueben, Edo State

Languages
- Olukumi, Igbo

Religion
- Christianity, Traditionalist

Related ethnic groups
- Yoruba, Igbo, Esan

The Olukumi are a Yoruba subgroup, predominantly found in the Aniocha North area of Delta State, with some presence in the Igueben area of Edo State, Nigeria. with ancestral ties to the regions of Owo, Akure, and Ife. Due to various historical and sociopolitical factors, the Olukumi migrated from their original homelands and eventually settled in their present locale. In the area now known as 'Delta state', the Olukumi established themselves in eight communities that are today collectively known as the Odiani clan, located west of the Niger river, in an area located between; Enuani (Ezechime and Idumuje), Ebu-Igala and Esan communities.

The towns of Ugbodu and Eko Ẹfun (Ukwu Nzu) were the first Olukumi towns. Ugbodu is headed by the Ọlọza Ugbodu H.R.M Ayo Isinyemenze (2005 – Date), while Ukwu Nzu later became a center of Ekumeku resistance, and subsequently an important center of the Olukumi or Odiani clan. It is the most populated of the Olukumi towns, and is traditionally headed by the Obi of Ukwu Nzu. The current king is H.R.M. Obi Christopher Ogoh I, (1974 – Date). Olukumi villages practice Monarchy, and leaders are selected through lineage pedigree and Gerontocracy, or the Okparan-Obi system.

== Geography ==
The Olukumi are native to an area west of the Niger River's right bank. The area is bordered on the north by the Esan village of Ohordua, and in the northeast by the Igala speaking Ebu in Oshimili North. On the west and south, they border the Idumuje and Ezechima clans within Aniocha North, both of which are Igbo speaking.

The area is rich in chalk and kaolin deposits, which is known as "Ẹfun" in Yoruba, and has been traditionally mined and used by the people of the area for various cultural purposes.

== Etymology ==
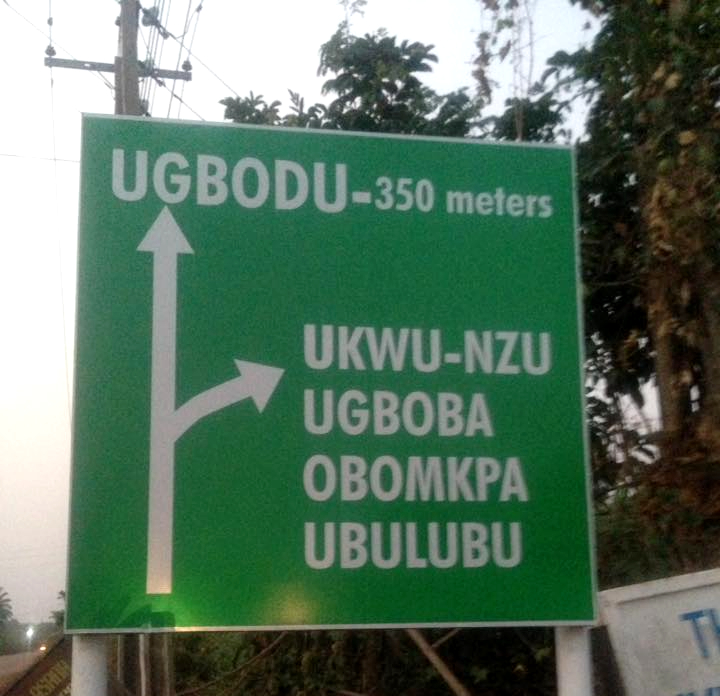
Road signage showing some Olukumi villages, Aniocha North, Delta State

The word Olukumi means "My confidant" or "My friend" in Yoruba Language.

== History ==
The Olukumis have been aptly described as a "Yoruba enclave", given their detachment from the main body of the rest of the Yoruba speaking groups. Based on earlier historiographic works by such authors as Prof. Onwuejeogwu and Nduka Okoh, the ‘peopling’ of the "Western Igbo" speaking area, can be classed into Nine different migration waves or strata based on different group movements. Within these movement categorizations, the Olukumis were already entrenched, and inhabited their present area by the 15th Century CE, firmly positioning them as the people with the oldest antiquity or presence in the Aniocha North and South area. This is further reflected in the fact that among their Igbo speaking neighbours, the Olukumis are described as "Ọdiani", a term which translates to mean "The Aborigines" or "Original occupiers".

=== History of Ugbodu ===
According to Ugbodu history, the first Olukumi settlement to be established was Ugboduwa lit. “The forest has saved us” shortened to Ugbodu, established sometime between the 12th and 14th centuries CE. The original founders of Ugbodu hailed from the Akure Kingdom led by one Kokoroko or Adetola, nicknamed the "Egban" (Elder). There are two popular versions to the story. In the first, the pioneers from Akure were part of an emigre group who deserted the Akure area during a period of civil unrest pertaining to rulership in the 13th century. In the second version, the Akure pioneers were part of the retinue of people who joined prince Oranmiyan on the movement from Ife to Benin in the 12th century. When Oranmiyan decided to return to his home of Ife years later, some of these people chose to stay back rather than return. The disbanded expeditionary force then became the core of the founding population of Ugbodu after subsequent intrigues took them further east, until they settled near the Odu river. Several decades later, they migrated 8 Kms south of the old site across the Ohe river due to persistent bushfires, to the portions they had previously kept as the farming area or "Ofoghọ". It was after these movements that some newer elements led by one Oligbo, which the Ugbodu folk called Isile, meaning 'settlers' or 'strangers', based on their perception of these people in the local Yoruba speech, established themselves close by. To these people, they introduced themselves as Olukumi. Ire Isile later on became Isele, and later on, was rendered by the colonial authorities as "Issele".

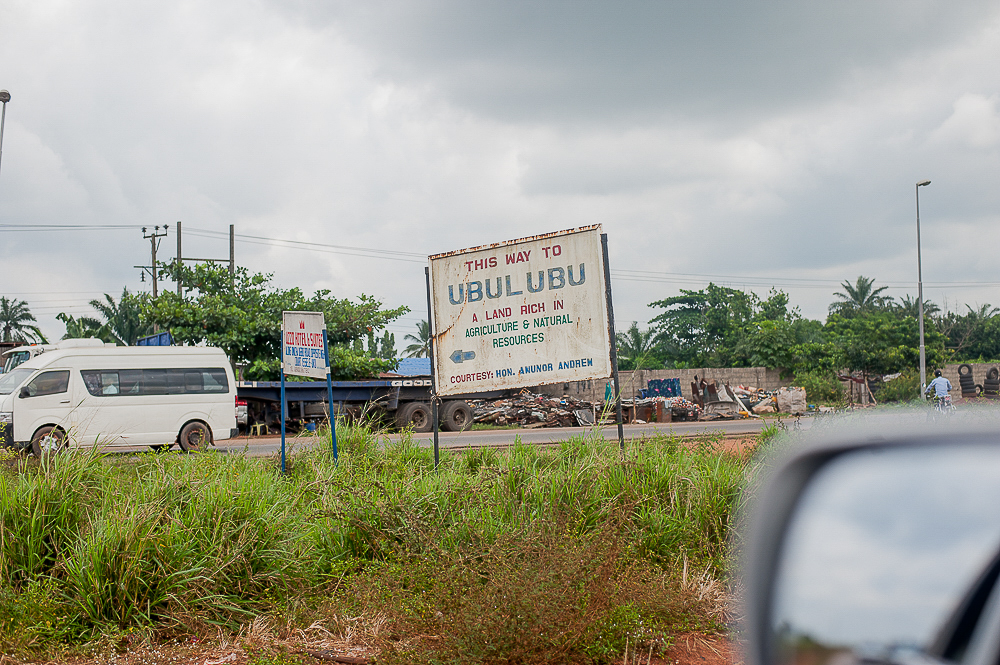
"This way to Ubulubu" signpost, an Olukumi village in Aniocha North.

Decades after, the people of Ohordua, whom the Olukumis call 'Ohuere' settled close by on the former farmlands of the Ugbodu folk north of the Ohe river, and it didn't take long for a conflict to develop between the Ohordua and Ugbodu folk over arable land. It was during the course of this unrest that a second Yoruba speaking group from Owo called the Ologun Uja lit. 'Warring fighters' showed up. To the astonishment of the Olukumis, this group spoke in an understandable language. Both groups synergised, and the Ima-Ugbodu faction (the earlier section from Akure) were assisted by the Ologun uja group in protracting the war against Ohordua which the combined Yoruba forces won in 1695, and after which a lasting peace treaty was agreed to by both sides. This was the origin of the "Ologoza" section within Ugbodu town.

Ugbodu is traditionally ruled by an Ọlọza or 'King', who traditionally resides in the Ogbe Ọgwa or royal section of town, while the Iyasere or traditional 'prime minister' was permanently designated to the people of Ogbe Ologoza. In addition, the Ologun-Uja (Ologoza) group has a sort of minor Ọlọza called the Ologun or Ale Ogun of Ugbodu lit. Chaser of war, which was a title established as a concession in appreciation of the role they played in the Azanama war with Ohordua discussed earlier. The first six Ọlọzas bore Yoruba names; Adetola, Aderemi, Ariyo, Odofin, Adetunji and Oyerinde, followed by an era of Edo name bearing Ọlọzas starting 1391 such as; Ogbelaka, Esigie and Izedonwen, and finally, Igbo name bearing ones since the middle of the 19th century, such as; Dike, Ochei and Isiyemenze. The two principal deities in Ugbodu are the Alẹ-Ugbodu and the Alẹ Igharẹ, which are connected to land (Alẹ) and elders/ancestors (Igharẹ).

=== History of Eko (Ukwu Nzu) ===
Eko Efun or Ukwunzu is the most populated of the Olukumi speaking villages and is made up of seven historic quarters which can be classed into two broad groups based on their histories. The history of Ukwu Nzu has not been as extensively covered or written about as that of Ugbodu, but it is evidently one of the two original and earliest Olukumi villages together with Ugbodu, from which the other Odiani communities were formed out of. According to Ukwu Nzu accounts of history and narrations from Obi Ogoh I, the founder of the town was Ogbe or Ugbe from Ife, who established the community in the 12th century.

According to the traditional ruler, centuries ago when Benin and its environs were still under the Ife Empire, they were directly governed by lesser kings or Ojiso who reported back to Ife. Subsequently, and due to the high handedness of these Ife administrators, the people protested and sent back to Ife, requesting for a king. "Orunmiha" was then sent, accompanied by many groups of people, as part of the travelling party. The founders of Eko were a part of the retinue of followers who had accompanied Prince Oranmiyan in his journey from Ife to Benin. After some time in Benin, many returned to Ife, via Usen, while others went eastwards from where they established Ukwu Nzu. An alternative account linking the foundation of the town to one Orogbuda who had seven sons, each of them pioneering a section of the town has been described as false, and rejected by the people of Ukwu Nzu.

The Olojaship (Obi) of Ukwu Nzu is rotational and does not remain within a single family. The current king belongs to the Ogbe Agidi quarter. According to the tradition of the town, the Ihongbuda deity plays a very central role in the town's coronation rituals. whenever the king dies, the base of the Ihogwuda or Ihongbuda deity would be moved from his palace/household into that of the next ruling family to produce the Oloja, and it is in the shrine that the rites of enthronement takes place as well.

=== Colonial period ===
During the colonial period, the Olukumi villages were grouped together as a separate independent native authority known as the "Odiani Village Area Native Authority".

The British colonial administration continued to file reports on the presence of Olukumi villages in the Asaba division, Benin province of colonial Nigeria throughout the 1930s. In 1953, Hurst Ulrich (Ulli Beier), A German scholar in Nigeria observed that the Olukumi communities were conscious of their Yoruba origins and regarded their language as a “Yoruba dialect”.

== Olukumi towns and communities ==
The following is a list of Olukumi town and communities, all together known as the Odiani clan.

s/n	Town	Origins	Comment(s)
1	Ukwu Nzu (Eko Ẹfun)	Ile Ife; 12th Century	Part of the two original Olukumi villages, said to be the political head of the Olukumi/Odiani clan, especially during the colonial period when it hosted the district court.
2	Ugbodu	Akure, Owo; Igbo tako Ondo state; Ogbe-Obi kingdom and traditional headquarters of Olukumí kingdom. 12th Century. || Part of the two original Olukumi villages.Traditional centre of Olukumi people. The Ologoza section are from Owo.	
3	Ubulubu	People from Ugbodu and Ukwu Nzu	An Olukumi town founded by some emigres from Ugbodu, later joined by others from Ukwu Nzu in the 1800s
4	Idumu Ogo	Founded by people from Ukwu Nzu, later reinforced by others from Ugbodu.	
5	Ugboba	Benin	
6	Ogodor	People from Ugboba	
7	Ogbe Onoi/Onei (Obomkpa)	From Idumu Olukumi of Ogbe Ofu in Ezi	
8	Anioma village	People from Ubulubu	

== Non-Odiani villages with Olukumi ancestral connections ==
=== Delta State ===
s/n	Town	Origins
9	Onichaku (Ubulu Uku).	Was founded by a warrior called Jowasoro from Ilesha.
10	Ogbekenu and Ikoko villages of Onicha-Ugbo.	Founded by people from Ikare Akoko
11	Idumu Olukumi/Onukumi of Ogbe Ofu (Ezi).	Founded by people from Ugbodu. The last Olukumi speaker in Ezi died in 1984.

=== Edo State ===
s/n	Town	Origins
12	Idunbelegha quarters of Amahor.	The Oldest established section of Amahor town, established around 1460. The Indigenous natives of Amahor are Olukumi.
13	Idumu Olukumi quarters of Igueben.	Founded by a trader, Olubunmi from Akure. The exact nature of the relationship with the Olukumi stock of Delta state is not clear, and it could represent a different stream of movement from the Yoruba speaking area.

In addition, Daryll Forde identifies the village of Adogo in the Ishan division as Olukumi.

== Society and groups ==
Olukumi society features the institutions of monarchy (traditionally known as Ọlọja, and subsequently as Ọlọza), and all its attendant or associated chieftaincy titles, i.e Iyase, as well as the; Ogun (The title of an initiate is Ikọ Ogun), Ogbuu, Awo, Iweyin Obu Okun and Egwungwun societies. These title societies have no age barrier to membership. The Igharẹ (elders above 70), Olotu (community of chiefs) and Inwene (female version of the Ikọ Ogun) have various restrictions. There is also the Omu institution strictly for womenfolk which is not of Yoruba origins like some of the others aforementioned, but is rather, completely unique to the Enuani region, and the culture of Nze title taking among members of the Ikparan society, which has its origins in Igboland east of the Niger.

== Language ==
The Olukumi people speak a Yoruba dialect of the same name, Olukumi, sometimes rendered as "Ulukwumi" which shares features of both Central (CY) and Southeastern Yoruba (SEY). They have little to no difficulty understanding standard Yoruba, as both dialects are mutually intelligible. Consequently, they are also able to understand the Ebu Igala dialect spoken very close-by, and the Itsekiri language, which are two other Yoruboid languages spoken within the same state of Delta. In addition, they also speak the Igbo language as a result of interaction with the people of the surrounding area.

According to a report in the Sunday Tribune of October 24, 2010, the Olukumi have started to organize recitation and oratory quizzes and competitions in Olukumi to prevent language loss due to constant linguistic attrition from the dominant surrounding igbo language, and preserve their unique ethnic identity. Linguists are also documenting the language. Dr. Elizabeth Arokoyo and Olamide Mabodu have worked on both print and talking versions of the Olukumi-English dictionary in collaboration with Dr. Greg Anderson and Dr. K. David Harrison of the Living Tongues Institute in 2012. Translations have also been done on the New Testament Bible, while for 40 years, Chief G.B. Nkemnacho, a lawyer of Olukumi origin, has documented his people's history as told by its elders as life experiences and oral tradition.

Of the eight Olukumi (Ọdiani) villages; Ugbodu, Eko (Ukwu Nzu), Idumu Ọgọ, Ubulubu, Ọgọdọr and Anioma speak Olukumi in the majority and Igbo as an additional language. In Ugboba, Igbo is dominant and Olukumi is marginal while Olukumi is very rarely ever spoken in Obomkpa. During the 1936-1939 colonial districts re-organization exercise, Obomkpa made a request to be transferred from the Odiani to the Eze Chima group on the basis of linguistic differences, which they were granted.

== Notable Olukumi people ==
- HRH Sir John Ofulue (1894-1999) - The traditional head of the UKU clan in old Bendel State, now Delta State, a royal father of the Olukumi kingdom, and a celebrated World war II veteran. Born to the great Royal family of Ofulue in the EBOR lineage of Ogbeobi Royal Family. His father HRM Ofulue and Mother Anyasi Ofulue (née Onitshabor). HRE John Ofulue married Beatrice Ofulue (née Mokwunye). In 1944, John Ofulue joined others from West African States to go to Burma, India for the 2nd world war. He returned to Nigeria in 1946 and started the popular John Charter Transport Company. He was a reverred leader of the Olukumi kingdom, and his death at 105yrs (1999) was widely celebrated due to his business successes and philanthropy.
- Prince Joseph Akabudike Ochei, BSc, LLB, LLM (London), (1931-2022) - A renowned Lawyer, economist, historian, archivist and diplomat. called to the Bar at Grays Inn of Court London, Solicitor of the Supreme Court of Nigeria. Author of the acclaimed book: 'Nigeria: The Road to Absolutism, Observations on the Executive Presidency in the Draft Constitution', 1977. His books and various seminal works published internationally and translated in fifteen (15) languages including, French, Italian, Spanish, Dutch, Mandarin, with electronic and print copies available in global research and public libraries in Oxford University, Cambridge University, British Library (UK), Yale University, Stanford University, Library of Congress Washington USA, and the University of Sydney Australia. Prince Akabudike Ochei is the youngest son of the ruling monarch Obi Ochei and his wife Nwasoma Ochei (née Ofulue) at the Royal Palace in Ugbodu. Nwasoma is the sister to HRE John Ofulue. The Ochei, Eboh and Ofulue royal ancestry can be traced across centuries from African Royal Dynasties.
- Prof. Joseph Ndidi Ofulue (1942 - 2026), BTech 1967, M.Eng (Dresden 1973), MPhil and PhD (Brunel 1978), FNSE, FNISE, FNIM, FTEMIC, FPEFON, FICPA (UK), COREN; First Nigerian Professor of Telecommunications and Satellite Communications Engineer. An expert in telecommunications and satellite technology systems, and mobile networks. Prof. Ofulue was a pioneer staff at Post & Telecom (P&T), NET, Nitel (Nigerian Telecommunications Plc), 1987-1988 joined INTELSAT in Washington D.C., http://www.itso.int http://www.intelsat.com, he held various positions as HOD and Dean at various Nigerian Universities. Prof. (Prince) Joseph N. Ofulue is the first son of HRE John Ofulue. The Prof., as he his fondly called is an avid tennis player and the author of several technical books and publications in satellite communications and electronic engineering. He served as the GM Operations, GM Planning & Operations, GM Planning & Research, GM Research & Development, GM Abuja, and briefly as the acting MD of Nitel during the transition of the IBB regime to Chief Ernest Shonekan to Gen. Sani Abacha. Prof., holds several patents, he is credited and widely known as the man who brought Nitel telephone card, Nitel pay phone, Nitel mobile telephony (090) to Nigeria in the early 1990s with the suite of 1G/2G Ericcson and Motorola products.
- Nduka Ugbade - Former Nigerian football star and coach.
- Rose Odika - Nigerian Nollywood actress.
- Helen Anyameluna - Second Miss Nigeria pageant title holder in 1958 after Grace Oyelude.
- 'Zeal' Onyecheme - Member of the popular R&B and Pop group Styl Plus, who have released several best selling singles, including "Olufunmi", "Iya Basira" and "Imagine that" amongst other hits.

== See also ==
- Yoruba people
- Anioma people

== Bibliography ==
- Nkemnacho, George Benin (28 February 2024). Olukumi Kingdom: A Peculiar Yoruba Enclave. Page Publishing Inc. ISBN 979-8-88960-315-3.
- Oden, Chrisantus (20 April 2020). Aspects of Olukumi Phonology. Archived from the original on 20 December 2021.
