= Diocese of Issele-Uku =

Roman Catholic diocese in Delta State, Nigeria

Diocese of Issele-Uku Dioecesis Isseleukuanus

Location
- Country: Nigeria
- Territory: Aniocha North and Aniocha South, Ika North East and Ika South, Oshimili North and Oshimili South in Delta State
- Ecclesiastical province: Archdiocese of Benin City
- Metropolitan: Benin City
- Coordinates: 6°19′11.98″N 6°28′36.65″E

Statistics
- Area: 3,011 km^{2} (1,163 sq mi)
- Population: Total; Catholics: (as of 2022); 1,554,925; 348,500 (22.4%)
- Parishes: 107
- Schools: 42

Information
- Denomination: Roman Catholic
- Rite: Latin Rite
- Established: July 5, 1973
- Cathedral: Saint Paul Cathedral, Issele-Uku
- Co-cathedral: Pro-Cathedral of Saint Joseph, Asaba
- Patron saint: Our Lady of Perpetual Help
- Secular priests: 193

Current leadership
- Pope: Leo XIV
- Bishop: Most Rev. Dr. Michael Odogwu Elue
- Metropolitan Archbishop: Archbishop of Benin City
- Vicar General: Very Rev Fr. Peter Onyeka Mobuogwu
- Bishops emeritus: Most Rev. Emmanuel Otteh

Map
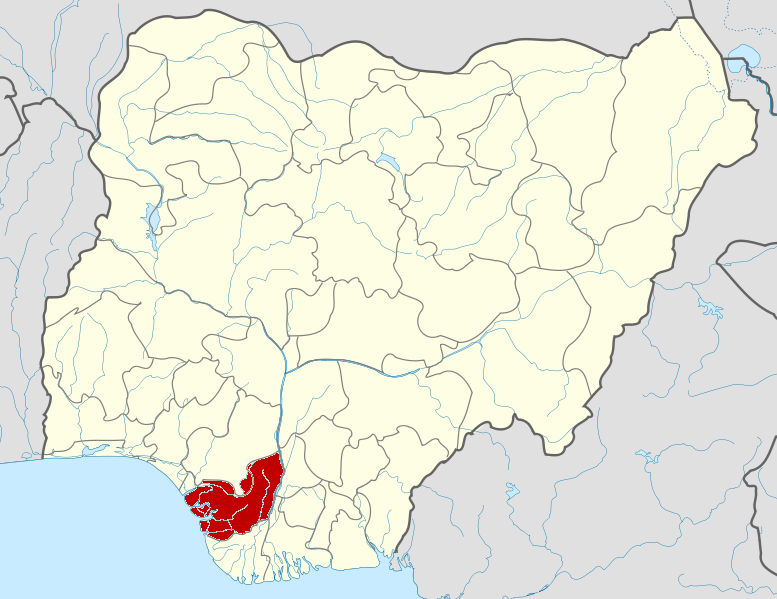
- Diocese of Issele-Uku is the northern portion of Delta State which is shown in red.

Website
- www.Issele-UkuDiocese.org

The Roman Catholic Diocese of Issele-Uku (Latin: Isseleukuan(us)) is a diocese located in the city of Issele-Uku, Delta State in the ecclesiastical province of the Roman Catholic Archdiocese of Benin City, Edo State, Nigeria. It lies on the west bank of the Niger River between Benin City to the west and Onitsha to the east. The diocese comprises six local government areas in the northern portion of Delta State. The Archdiocese of Onitsha borders it on the east and the Archdiocese of Benin City borders it on the west. The Diocese of Uromi is to its north and the Diocese of Warri borders it on the south.

== History ==
The first Mass in the diocese was celebrated on March 5, 1888 and the first missionary was Fr. Carlo Zappa. The Diocese of Issele-Uku was created on July 5, 1973 from the territory which was once part of the Roman Catholic Archdiocese of Benin City. It now covers the northern part of Delta State west of the River Niger and the state capital, Asaba including the following six Local Government Areas of Nigeria: Aniocha North and Aniocha South, Ika North East and Ika South, Oshimili North and Oshimili South, and has a land mass of 3,011 square Km. The diocese has grown from the initial eight parishes with which it began to 44 parishes and 18 independent stations in 2011.

== Diocesan statistics ==
The diocese at the end of the year 2006 had a population of 996,410 people, including 308,596 baptized Catholics, constituting 31% of the population. Statistics are taken from the Annuario Pontificio.

Year	Population			Priests				Deacons	Religious		Parishes
	baptised	total	%	number	secular	regular	baptised per priest		men	women
1980	64.312	406.000	15,8	23	13	10	2.796		10	21	13
1990	99.727	358.142	27,8	35	30	5	2.849		12	46	22
1999	240.184	715.878	33,6	55	47	8	4.366		15	60	31
2000	245.186	734.199	33,4	60	51	9	4.086		18	61	35
2001	254.995	785.594	32,5	67	58	9	3.805		18	61	35
2002	275.300	883.790	31,1	65	57	8	4.235		17	83	36
2003	283.850	905.884	31,3	66	57	9	4.300		18	93	36
2004	292.366	951.117	30,7	76	66	10	3.846		19	101	36
2006	308.596	996.410	31,0	89	79	10	3.467		28	118	36
2012	364.000	1.153.000	31,5	101	89	12			30	150	64

== Additional statistics ==
- Catholic Churches in the Diocese 61
- Nigerian Diocesan Priests: 130
- Major Seminarians: 179
- Priests on further studies abroad: 7
- Priests on Mission in the United States: 18

== Special churches ==
St. Paul Cathedral in Issele-Uku. See picture of cathedral:

== Bishops ==
- Bishop Anthony Okonkwo Gbuji (07.05.1973 – 11.08.1996), appointed Bishop of Enugu
- Bishop Emmanuel Otteh (11.08.1996 – 11.14.2003) Bishop Emeritus
- Rev Michael Odogwu Elue (Apostolic Administrator 11.14.2003 until episcopal ordination on 02.21.2004 see below)
- Bishop Michael Odogwu Elue (see above 02.21.2004 - )

=== Other priest of this diocese who became bishop ===
- Augustine Obiora Akubeze, appointed Bishop of Uromi in 2005

== Bishop's house ==
- P.O. Box 63
- Issele-Uku, Delta State, Nigeria
- Telephone: Office: 048 880 187
- Asaba Office: 056 280 412
- Fax 1: 056 280 412
- Fax 2: 048880 0187
- GSM: 0803 714 2369

== Episcopal regions ==
- Issele-Uku Region
1. St. Paul's Cathedral, Issele-Uku
2. St. Raphael's, Akwukwu-Igbo
3. St. John the Evangelist, Illah
4. St. Theresa's, Ebu
5. St. Andrew's, Ezi
6. St. Matthew's, Idumuje-Unor
7. Our Lady of Lourdes, Onicha-Olona
8. All Saints, Onicha-Ugbo
9. St. James, Ubulu-Okiti
10. Sacred Heart, Obomkpa
11. St. Michael's Onicha-Uku
12. St. Anthony, Ogbe-Ofu, Issele-Uku
13. St. Lawrence, Issele-Mkpitime
- Asaba Region
1. St. Joseph's, Asaba
2. St. Patrick's, West End, Asaba
3. St. Patrick's, Cable Point, Asaba
4. Our Lady of Assumption, Asaba
5. St. Brigid's, Asaba
6. St. Augustine's, Ibusa
7. St. Monica's, Ibusa
8. St. Michael's, Okpanam
9. St. Theresa's, Okwe
10. St. Michael's, Oko
11. Ss. Peter and Paul, Issele-Azagba
12. St. Benedict's, Akwu-Ebolo, Asaba
13. St. John Bosco, Asaba
14. Ss. Peter and Paul, Ugbolu
15. Sacred Heart, Bonsaic
- Agbor Region
1. St. John the Baptist, Agbor
2. St. Joseph's, Agbor
3. St. Patrick's, Azu-Owa
4. St. Patrick's Agbor-Obi
5. St. Mark's, Alisimie
6. St. Dominic's, Boji-Boji Owa
7. Holy Rosary, Abavo
8. St. John the Evangelist, Ewuru
9. St. Columba's, Agbor
10. St. Benedict's, Agbonta
11. All Saints, Alihami
- Umunede Region
1. Sacred Heart, Umunede
2. Immaculate Heart, Umunede
3. St. Dominic, Otolokpo
4. St. Augustine, Ute-Ogbeje
5. St. Joseph, Akumazi
6. St. Luke, Emuhu
7. Immaculate Heart of Mary, Ute-Okpu
8. St. Louis, Ekuku-Agbor
9. St. Martin's, Igbodo
10. St. Francis Xavier's, Idumesah
11. St. Jude, Owa-Oyibo
- Ogwashi-Uku Region
1. Mary Immaculate, Ogwashi-Uku
2. St. Patrick's, Ogwashi-Uku
3. St. Charles, Ubulu-Uku
4. St. Michael's, Ubulu-Uku
5. Holy Trinity, Ewulu
6. St. Joseph's, Nsukwa
7. Immaculate Conceptini, Isheagu
8. Ejeme-Aniogor Independent Station
9. St. John the Baptist, Ubulu-Unor
10. St. Theresa's, Obior

== Parishes ==
- Map with pointers to parishes and institutions

1. Abavo: Holy Rosary Parish, P.O. Box 88, Abavo
2. Abavo: St. Patrick's Parish, Azu Owa, P.O. Box 70, Abavo
3. Agbor: St. Columba's Parish, P.O. Box 1051, Agbor
4. Agbor: St. Joseph's Parish, P.O. Box 749, Agbor
5. Agbor Boji-Boji: St. John the Baptist Parish, P.O. Box 1600, Boji-Boji, Agbor
6. Agbor Obi: St. Patrick's Parish, P.O. Box 1725, Agbor-Obi.
7. Akumazi: St. Joseph's Parish, P.O. Box 336, Umunede
8. Akwu-Ebolo: St. Benedict's Parish
9. Akwukwu-Igbo: St. Raphael Parish
10. Asaba: Church of Assumption Parish, Asaba
11. Asaba: St. Brigid Parish
12. Asaba: St. John Bosco Parish
13. Asaba: St. Joseph's Parish, P.O. Box 25, Asaba.
14. Asaba Cable Point: St. Patrick's Parish, P.O. Box 793, Asaba
15. Asaba West End, St. Patrick's Parish, P.O. Box 997, West End, Asaba
16. Asaba:St. John Mary Vianney Asaba
17. Asaba: Emmanuel the Savior Church Asaba
18. Ebu: St Theresa's Parish
19. Ekuku-Agbor: St Louis Parish, P.O. Box 63, Ekuku-Agbor
20. Ewulu: Holy Trinity Parish, P.O. Box 137, Ogwashi-Uku
21. Ezi: St Andrew's Parish, PO Box 20, Ezi
22. Igbuzor (Ibusa): St Augustine's Parish, P.O. Box 93, Ibusa
23. Igbuzor (Ibusa): St Monica's Parish, P.O. Box 414, Ibusa
24. Igbuzor (Ibusa): St Thomas Parish
25. Idumesah: St Francis Xavier Parish, P.O. Box 77, Idumesah
26. Idumuje-Unor: St Matthew's Parish
27. Illah: St John the Evangelist Parish, P.O. Box 18, Illah
28. Isheagu: Immaculate Conception Parish, P.O. Box 16, Isheagu
29. Issele-Uku: St Paul's Cathedral, P.O. Box 26, Issele-Uku
30. Nsukwa: St Joseph's Parish, P.O. Box 16, Nsukwa
31. Ogwashi-Uku: Mary Immaculate Parish, P.O. Box 4, Ogwashi-Uku
32. Ogwashi-Uku: St Patrick's Parish, P.O. Box 28, Ogwashi-Uku
33. Okpanam: St Michael's Parish, P.O. Box 155, Okpanam
34. Okwe: St Theresa's Parish
35. Onicha-Olona: Our Lady of Lourdes Parish, P.O. Box 40, Onicha-Olona
36. Onicha-Ugbo: All Saints Parish, P.O. Box 57, Onicha-Ugbo
37. Otolokpo: St Dominic's Parish, P.O. Box 281, Umunede
38. Owa-Boji: St Dominic's Parish, P.O. Box 8, Owanta, Boji-Boji
39. Ubulu-Okiti: St James Parish, P.O. Box 72, Ubulu-Okiti
40. Ubulu-Uku: St Charles' Parish, P.O. Box 42
41. Ubulu-Uku: St Michael's Parish, P.O. Box 96
42. Umunede: Immaculate Heart Parish
43. Umunede: Sacred Heart, P.O. Box 7, Umunede
44. Ute-Ogbeje: St Augustine's Parish, P.O. Box 9, Umunede

=== Independent stations ===
1. Agbor-Nta: St. Benedict Catholic Church
2. Alisimie: St. Mark Catholic Church
3. Alihami: All Saints Catholic Church
4. Asaba: Sacred Heart Catholic Church, Bonsiac
5. Ejeme-Aniogor: St. Felix Catholic Church, P.O. Box 174
6. Emuhu: St Luke Catholic Church
7. Ewuru: St John the Evangelist, P.O. Box 1053
8. Igbodo: St. Martin de Tours Catholic Church
9. Issele-Azagba: Ss Peter & Paul Catholic Church, P.O. Box 78
10. Issele-Mkpitime: St. Lawrence Catholic Church
11. Issele-Uku: St. Anthony of Padua Catholic Church, Ogbe-Ofu
12. Obior: St. Theresa of Avila Catholic Church
13. Obomkpa: Sacred Heart Catholic Church, P.O. Box 27, Issele-Uku
14. Oko: St. Micheal Catholic Church
15. Onicha-Uku: St. Michael Catholic Church
16. Owa-Oyibu: St. Jude Catholic Church
17. Ubulu-Unor: St. John the Baptist, P.O. Box 96
18. Ugbolu: Ss. Peter and Paul Catholic Church
19. Ute-Okpu: Immaculate Heart of Mary Catholic Church

== Higher institutions chaplaincy ==
1. College of Education, Agbor
2. Delta State University, Asaba Campus, Asaba
3. Federal College of Education Technical, Asaba
4. St. John's, Alihagu

== Nurseries and primary schools ==
1. Holy Infant International School, Agbor
2. Regina Mundi Nursery/Primary School, Asaba
3. St. Mary Anne Nursery/Primary School, Ebu
4. Mercy Nursery/Primary School, Ibusa
5. St. Maria Gorretti School, Illah
6. Immaculate Conception Nursery/Primary School, Ishiagu
7. Holy Child School, Issele-Uku
8. Divine Love Nursery/Primary School, Ogwashi-Uku
9. Holy Child School, Onicha-Olona
10. Divine Love School, Ubulu-Uku
11. Sacred Heart Nursery/Primary School, Umunede
12. St. Augustine Nursery/Primary School, Ubulu-Okiti

== Secondary schools ==
1. Dominican Vocational School, Agbor
2. Holy Infant Secondary School, Agbor
3. Madonna Comprehensive Secondary School, Akwukwu-Igbo
4. St John's Secondary School, Alihagu
5. Mercy Girls' Secondary School, Aliokpu Agbor
6. Juniorate Girls' Secondary School, Issele-Uku
7. Divine Love Secondary School, Ubulu-Uku
8. St. Patrick's College, Asaba
9. St. Paul's Grammar School, Ebu
10. St. Brigid's Girls Grammar School, [Asaba Delta State]
11. St. Martin De Porres Girls Grammar School, [Onicha-Olona]

== Institutions ==
1. Madonna School for the Handicapped, Okpanam
2. Regina Mundi Computers, Ogwashi-Uku

== Hospitals and maternities ==
1. Catholic Health Centre, Ewulu
2. Catholic Maternity and Hospital, P.O. Box 98, Ekuku-Agbor
3. St Anthony's Catholic Maternity, P.O. Box 206, Ubulu-Uku
4. St Elizabeth's Catholic Maternity, P.O. Box 43, Umunede
5. St John's Hospital, P.O. Box 1896, Agbor
6. St Joseph Hospital, P.O. Box 911, Asaba
7. St Mary's Hospital, P.O. Box 38, Ogwashi-Uku
8. St Theresa's Hospital, P.O. Box 63, Issele-Uku

== Special homes ==
1. Pro Labore Dei, Asaba
2. Home for Old People, Asaba
3. Home for Destitutes, Agbor
4. Home for Destitutes, Umunede

== Special institutions ==
1. Pastoral Centre, Issele-Uku
2. School of Evangelization, Issele-Uku
3. Leprosaria, Abor Ogwashi-Uku
4. Leprosaria, Ute-Enugu

== Female religious houses ==
1. Daughters of Charity of Saint Vincent de Paul, Okpanam
2. Daughters of Charity of Saint Vincent de Paul, Box 121, Umunede
3. DDL Daughters of Divine Love, Akwukwu-Igbo
4. DDL Daughters of Divine Love, Box 63, Issele-Uku
5. DDL Daughters of Divine Love, Gbenoba, Agbor-Obi
6. DDL Daughters of Divine Love, Illah, c/o St John’s, Box 18, Illah
7. DDL Daughters of Divine Love, Ubulu-Uku
8. DMMM Daughters of Mary Mother of Mercy , Aliokpu
9. DMMM Daughters of Mary Mother of Mercy Convent, Box 60, Issele-Uku
10. DMMM Daughters of Mary Mother of Mercy Convent, Igbuzor
11. DMMM Daughters of Mary Mother of Mercy, Onicha-Olona
12. DMMM Daughters of Mary Mother of Mercy, Ubulu-Uku
13. Dominican Sisters of St. Catherine,, , Agbor-Obi
14. Franciscan Sisters, Ogwashi-Uku
15. Immaculate Heart Sisters, Okpanam
16. NES New Evangelization Sisters of Mother of Perpetual Help,, Agbor
17. NES New Evangelization Sisters of Mother of Perpetual Help, Box 63, Issele-Uku
18. NES New Evangelization Sisters of Mother of Perpetual Help, Box 72, Ubulu-Okiti
19. NES New Evangelization Sisters of Mother of Perpetual Help, Ogwashi-Uku
20. OLA Sisters of Our Lady of Apostles,, Box 2170, Agbor
21. OLA Sisters of Our Lady of Apostles Convent, Box 54, Asaba
22. SSL Sisters of St Louis (in Nigeria), Ewulu

== Male religious houses ==
1. OSA Order of Saint Augustine, Box 32, Igbuzor
2. OP Order of Preachers, St Patrick’s Church, Agbor-Obi, Box 1725, Agbor
3. SMA Society of African Missions, St Patrick's Church, Cable Point, Asaba, Box 793, Asaba

== Priestly formation ==
- Saints Peter and Paul Major Seminary, Ibadan, Oyo State, Nigeria
- All Saints Major Seminary, Uhiele-Ekpoma, Edo State, Nigeria
- Saint Felix Minor Seminary, P.O. Box 174, Ejeme-Aniogor, Delta State, Nigeria

== Politics ==
The diocese is located in the northern area of Delta State which is structured according to political divisions known as local government areas (L.G.A.s). There were in 1991 twelve LGAs, then nineteen and now there are 25 LGAs. The Diocese of Issele-Uku now covers six of the local government areas: Aniocha North and Aniocha South, Ika North East and Ika South, and Oshimili North and Oshimili South, and with a land mass of 3,011 square Km.

== See also ==
- Roman Catholicism in Nigeria
- Template:Nigeria states map
- Outline of Nigeria
