= Debuccalization =

Sound change towards glottal articulation

Debuccalization, or deoralization, is a sound change or alternation in which an oral consonant loses its original place of articulation and moves it to the glottis ([h], [ɦ], or [ʔ]). The pronunciation of a consonant as [h] is sometimes called aspiration, but in phonetics, aspiration is the burst of air accompanying a stop. The word comes from Latin bucca, meaning 'cheek' or 'mouth'.

Debuccalization is usually seen as a subtype of lenition, which is often defined as a sound change involving the weakening of a consonant by progressive shifts in pronunciation. As with other forms of lenition, debuccalization may be synchronic or diachronic (i.e. it may involve alternations within a language depending on context or sound changes across time).

Debuccalization processes occur in many different types of environments such as the following:

- word-initially, as in Kannada
- word-finally, as in Burmese
- intervocalically, as in a number of English varieties (e.g. litter [ˈlɪʔə]), or in Tuscan (the house /la kasa/ → [la ˈhaːsa])

== Glottal stop ==
=== Arabic ===
/q/ is debuccalized to /ʔ/ in several Arabic varieties, such as northern Egyptian, Lebanese, western Syrian, and urban Palestinian dialects, partially also in Jordanian Arabic (especially by female speakers). The Maltese language, which was originally an Arabic dialect, also shows this feature.

=== Indo-European languages ===
==== British and American English ====
Most English-speakers in England and many speakers of American English debuccalize /t/ to a glottal stop [ʔ] in two environments: in word-final position before another consonant (American English IPA)

- get ready [ˈɡɛʔˈɹɛɾi]
- not much [ˈnɑʔˈmʌtʃ]
- not good [ˈnɑʔˈɡʊd̚]
- it says [ɪʔˈsɛz]

Before a syllabic [n̩] following /l/, /r/, /n/, a vowel, or a diphthong. The /t/ may then also be nasally released. (American English IPA)

- Milton [ˈmɪlʔn̩]
- Martin [ˈmɑɹʔn̩]
- mountain [ˈmæʊnʔn̩]
- cotton [ˈkʰɑʔn̩]
- Latin [ˈlæʔn̩]
- Layton [ˈleɪʔn̩]

==== Cockney English ====
In Cockney English, /t/ is often realized as a glottal stop [ʔ] between vowels, liquids, and nasals (notably in the word bottle), a process called t-glottalization.

==== German ====
The German ending -en is commonly realized as an assimilated syllabic nasal. Preceding voiceless stops are then glottally released: Latten [ˈlat͡ʔn̩] ('laths'), Nacken [ˈnak͡ʔŋ̍] ('nape of the neck'). When such a stop is additionally preceded by a homorganic sonorant, it tends to be debuccalized entirely and create the clusters [mʔm̩, lʔn̩, nʔn̩, ŋʔŋ̍]. For example, Lumpen [ˈlʊmʔm̩] ('rag'), Banken [ˈbaŋʔŋ̍] ('banks').

Voiced stops are not usually debuccalized. However, many Upper German and East Central German dialects merge voiced and unvoiced stops at least word-internally, and the merged consonants may be debuccalized. For example, in Bavarian, both Anten ('ducks') and Anden ('Andes') are pronounced [ˈɑnʔn̩]. Speakers are often unaware of that.

However, Standard German spoken in Luxembourg often lacks syllabic sonorants under the influence of Luxembourgish, so that -en is pronounced [ən], rather than [n̩] or [ŋ̍].

=== Austronesian languages ===
==== Indonesian and Malay ====
In both languages, syllable-final -k is realized as either [k] or [ʔ]. However, the pronunciation in Indonesian has been increasingly reverted to [k] exempting some function words, especially among television news anchors, because of influence of Betawi (or Jakartan Indonesian).

==== Sulawesi languages ====
Debuccalization is very common in parts of Sulawesi. Especially in the South Sulawesi branch, most languages have turned word-final *t and *k into a glottal stop.

In every Gorontalic language except Buol and Kaidipang, *k was replaced by a glottal stop, and lost altogether in word-initial position: *kayu → Gorontalo ayu 'wood', *konuku → olu'u 'fingernail'. However, if it followed *ŋ, then *k voiced into g in Gorontalo (*koŋkomo → onggomo 'handful').

Debuccalization is also common in the Sangiric branch. In Sangir and Bantik, all final voiceless stops were reduced into ʔ (*manuk → manu' "bird"). Also in Ratahan, final *t became ʔ (*takut → taku' "to fear"). In Talaud, all instances of Proto-Sangiric *k were debuccalized into ʔ except when following *ŋ (*kiki → i'i "to bite", but *beŋkol → bengkola "bent"). Other newer instances of k resulted from *R when geminated or being word-final (ʐ elsewhere), e.g. *bəRu → bakku "new", *bibiR → biwikka "lip", *bəŋaR → bangngaka "molar".

Proto-Sangiric	Bantik	Ratahan	Sangir	Talaud
*kayu "wood, tree"	kayu		kalu	alu
*likud "back"	likudu'	likur	likude'	li'udda
*beŋkol "bent"	bengkolo'	vengkol	bengko'	bengkola
*atup "roof"	atu'	atup	atu'	atuppa
*takut "fear"	taku'			ta'utta
*manuk "bird"	manu'	manuk	manu'	manu'a

==== Polynesian languages ====
Many Polynesian languages lost the original glottal stop *ʔ of their ancestor Proto-Polynesian but later debuccalized other consonants into a glottal stop /ʔ/. That applied to different consonants depending on the language, for example:

- Samoan /ʔ/ < PPn *k
- Tahitian /ʔ/ < PPn *k, *ŋ
- Marquesan /ʔ/ < PPn *l, *r
- Mangarevan /ʔ/ < PPn *f, *s
- Rurutu /ʔ/ < PPn *k, *ŋ, *f, *s
- Hawaiian /ʔ/ < PPn *k, *l, *r.

== Glottal fricative ==
=== Indo-European languages ===
==== Slavic ====
Older /ɡ/ was spirantized and later debuccalized in languages such as Belarusian, the Czech–Slovak languages, Ukrainian, and Upper Sorbian, e.g. Serbian bog, Russian box, Czech bůh, Ukrainian bih.

==== English ====
===== Scots and Scottish English =====
In some varieties of Scots and Scottish English, particularly on the West Coast, a non word-final /θ/ th shifted to [h], a process called th-debuccalization. For example, /θɪn/ is realized as [hɪn].

===== Scouse =====
Pre-pausally, /t/ may be debuccalized to [h]: it, lot, that, what are then pronounced [ɪh, lɒh, d̪ah, wɒh].

==== Proto-Greek ====
In Proto-Greek, /s/ shifted to [h] initially and between sonorants (vowels, liquids, and nasals).

- Proto-Indo-European *septḿ̥ → Proto-Greek *heptə́ → Ancient Greek heptá (ἑπτά) "seven" (vs. Latin septem)

Intervocalic /h/ had been lost by the time of Ancient Greek, and vowels in hiatus were contracted in the Attic dialect.

- post-PIE *ǵénesos → Proto-Greek *génehos → Ionic géneos (γένεος) : Attic génous (γένους) "of a race"

Before a liquid or nasal, an /h/ was assimilated to the preceding vowel in Attic-Ionic and Doric and to the following nasal in Aeolic. The process is also described as the loss of /h/ and the subsequent lengthening of a vowel or consonant, which kept the syllable the same length (compensatory lengthening).

- PIE *h₁ésmi → Proto-Greek *ehmi → Attic-Ionic ēmí (εἰμί) : Aeolic émmi (ἔμμι) "I am"

==== Indo-Aryan ====
===== Sanskrit =====
In Sanskrit, /s, r/ becomes [h] (written ḥ in transliteration) before a pause: e.g. kā́mas ('desire'), punar ('again') become kā́maḥ, punaḥ.

Additionally, the Proto-Indo-European aspirated voiced palato-velar *ǵʰ [ɟʱ] became [ɦ] through successive affrication, assibilation and debuccalization: e.g. *bʰeh₂ǵʰús "arm" becomes Sanskrit bāhúḥ. There are rare instances where bh, dh debuccalized but was preserved in Prakrits, e.g. PIE *h₁idʰe-, Sanskrit iha, Pali idha; PIE *rewdʰ-, Sanskrit rohiṇī, Gawri ruīnī, Khowar ron.

===== Bengali =====
In many Eastern Bengali dialects, the voiceless palato-alveolar sibilant /ʃ/ can become debuccalized to glottal [h] or [ɦ], e.g. /ʃälä/ "wife's brother" is [ɦälä], and /ʃägoɾ/ "sea" is [ɦä(g)oɾ]. The tenuis and aspirated forms of the labial stop /p/, /pʰ/ and velar stop /k/, /kʰ/ can get lenited to /ɸ/ and /x/ respectively, but also be further debuccalized to [h] or [ɦ], e.g. /pägol/ "mad" is [ɦägol] and /pʰokiɾ/ ~ /ɸokiɾ/ "beggar, faqir" is [ɸoɦiɾ]. In some cases, even the glottal fricative is dropped, e.g. /äʃilo/ "(he / she / it) came" is [äi̯lo].

===== Others =====
The Gujarati colloquial register has [s] or both [s] and [ʃ] debuccalized to voiceless [h]. For educated speakers speaking this register, this replacement does not extend to borrowings from Sanskrit.

==== West Iberian ====
===== Spanish =====
A number of Spanish dialects debuccalize /s/ to [h] or to [ɦ] at the end of a syllable or intervocalically in certain instances. Some further undergo deletion and compensatory lengthening of nearby vowel or consonant.

===== Galician =====
In many varieties of Galician, as well as in Galician-influenced Spanish, the phoneme /ɡ/ may debuccalize (gheada) to [ħ] in most or all instances; [x] and [h] are also possible realizations. There is also an inverse hypercorrection process of older or less educated Galician speakers replacing the phoneme /x/ of Spanish with [ɡ], which is called gueada.

===== Portuguese =====
Portuguese is much less affected by debuccalization, but it is especially notable in its Brazilian variety.

Throughout Brazil, the phoneme /ʁ/ (historically an alveolar trill /r/ that moved to an uvular position) has a rather long inventory of allophones: [r ɻ̝̊ ç x ɣ χ ʁ ʀ ħ h ɦ]. Only [ɣ] is uncommon. Few dialects, such as sulista and fluminense, give preference to voiced allophones; elsewhere, they are common only as coda, before voiced consonants.

In such dialects, especially among people speaking an educated variety of Portuguese, it is usual for the rhotic coda in the syllable rhyme to be an alveolar tap, as in European Portuguese and many registers of Spanish, or to be realized as [χ] or [x]. In the rest of the country, it is generally realized as [h], even by speakers who either do not normally use that allophone or delete it entirely, as is common in the vernacular.

However, in some mineiro- and mineiro-influenced fluminense rural registers, [h] is used but as an allophone of /l/ (rhotic consonants are most often deleted), a mar-mal merger, instead of the much more common and less-stigmatized mau-mal merger characteristic of all Brazilian urban centers except for those bordering Mercosur countries, where coda [ɫ] was preserved, and the entire North and Northeast regions. Its origin is the replacement of indigenous languages and línguas gerais by Portuguese, which created [ɹ], [ɻ] and r-colored vowel as allophones of both /ɾ/ (now mostly /ʁ/) and /l/ (now mostly [u̯ ~ ʊ̯]) phonemes in the coda since Native Brazilians could not easily pronounce them (caipira dialect). The later Portuguese influence from other regions made those allophones become rarer in some areas, but the mar-mal merger remained in a few isolated villages and towns.

Finally, many fluminense registers, especially those of the poor and of the youth; most northern and northeastern dialects; and, to a much minor degree, all other Brazilian dialects, debuccalize /s/ but less often than in Spanish. However, a mar-mas merger or even a mar-mais merger occurs: mas mesmo assim "but even so" or mas mesma, sim "though, right, the same (f) one" [mɐɦ ˈmeɦmə ˈsĩ]; mais light "lighter, more slim", or also "less caloric/fatty" [ˈmaɦ ˈlajtɕ]; mas de mim, não "but from me, no" or mais de mim, não "not more from me" [ˈmaɦ dʑi ˈmĩ ˈnɜ̃w]. A coda rhotic in the Brazilian dialects in the Centro-Sul area is hardly ever glottal, and the debuccalized /s/ is unlikely to be confused with it.

==== Romanian ====
In the Moldavian dialect of Romanian, /f/ is debuccalized to [h] and so, for example, să fie becomes să hie. The same occurred in Old Spanish and Old Gascon and still occurs in Sylheti.

==== Goidelic languages ====
In Scottish and Irish Gaelic, s and t changed by lenition to [h], spelled sh and th.

==== Faliscan ====
Inscription in Faliscan from the 4th century BC onward show the occasional debuccalization of /f/ to /h/ (e.g. hileo : Latin filius). Whether the shift is displayed in the inscriptions is highly irregular, with some forms even showing an ostensibly opposite shift of written f in place of an expected h (e.g. fe : Latin hic), possibly by means of hypercorrection.

=== Austroasiatic languages ===
==== Khmer ====
During Old Khmer period, syllable-final ស /s/ began debuccalization to /h/. The historical change is reflected in Modern Khmer, in which final /s/ is generally pronounced /h/, although the original consonant remains represented by the traditional orthography.

=== Austronesian languages ===
==== Malay ====
In several peninsular Malay dialects, final -s is realized as [h].

==== Batak languages ====
In the Batak branch, all southern languages (but not the northern ones including Karo) have debuccalized *k into h except when word-final or followed *ŋ. Both Angkola and Mandailing have restored k within the sequence hVhV (Angkola kehe, Mandailing ke, but Toba hehe) or following a consonant in Mandailing (ala "scorpion" → parkalahan). Mandailing, however has also further deleted *h (*kalak → alak "person") except in the sequence -aha- (dahan "mushroom", not *dan).

==== Polynesian languages ====
Polynesian languages commonly reflect debuccalization not only into a glottal stop /ʔ/ but also into a glottal fricative /h/. The exact distribution depends on the language:

- most languages reflect a regular change PPn *s > /h/
- in several languages, the outcome of PPn *f is irregular across the lexicon, with no obvious conditioning:
  PPn *f > Tahitian /f/, /h/; Māori /ɸ/, /h/; Hawaiian /w/, /h/, etc.

=== Other families ===
==== Yoruboid languages ====
Debuccalization occurs extensively within the dialectal continuum of Yoruboid languages, particularly among the Olukumi language, Igala language, the Northeast Yoruba dialect known as Owe, and Southeastern dialects of the Yoruba language, such as Ikale. Many of those shifts came from Proto-Yoruboid language (or its daughter language Proto-Edekiri), and descendant languages shifted from /s/ to /h/. In other cases, shifts from /f/ to /h/ also occur from Proto-Yoruboid to Standard Yoruba. Many other alternatives shift from /s/ to /r/, but it is unclear if that process is associated with the debuccalization occurring.

- Proto-Yoruboid *sì → Igala hì, Proto-Edekiri *sè → Owe hè, Olukumi hè, Ikale hè "to cook" (vs. Standard Yoruba sè)
- Proto-Yoruboid *è-so → Igala èho, Proto-Edekiri *è-ho → Owe èho, Olukumi èhojin "fruit, seed (something that is sowed)" (vs. Standard Yoruba èso)
- Proto-Edekiri *V̀-sʊ̃ → Ikale ùhọngbẹ́, Olukumi ùhọn "ground squirrel" (vs. Ekiti Yoruba ụ̀sụn)
- Proto-Yoruboid *á-folo → Igala áfolo (vs. Standard Yoruba ehoro)

Debuccalization also occurs in other Volta-Niger languages, including Igbo, the Ayere-Ahan languages and Edo.

==== Japanese ====
In Early Modern Japanese, the labial fricative [ɸ] (derived from Old Japanese */p/) was debuccalized to [h] before /a, o, e/. (It remained labial [ɸ] before /u/ and was palatalized to [ç] before /i, j/.) In some modern dialects, such as the Kansai dialect, /s/ is sometimes debuccalized to /h/.

==== Dravidian ====
In Old Kannada between 10th and the 14th centuries, most of the initial /p/ debuccalized into a /h/ (Old Kannada paḍagu, pattu, balupu, Kannada haḍahu, hattu, baluhu "ship, ten, strength") and disappeared in many Kannadoid languages (Sholaga attu). Proto-Dravidian *c often spirantized, debuccalized or disappeared in its daughter languages through c > s > h > ∅ (*cīntu > Tamil īñcu "date fruit"). Various Central Indian Dravidian languages like the Gondi languages are in various stages of the process: sindi, hīndi, īndi, Proto-Dravidian *wec-, Kuvi wespini, wehini. Intervocalic /k/ has debuccalized for many Tamil-speakers (Standard Tamil pakai > [pɐhɛ], Kannada hage). Southern and western dialects of Malto have /ʔ/ instead of /q/ and /h/ instead of /ʁ/ and /ŋʁ/.

==== Slavey ====
All coda consonants in Slavey must be glottal. When a non-glottal consonant would otherwise be positioned in a syllable coda, it debuccalizes to [h]:

- /ts’ad/ → [ts’ah] ('hat')
- /xaz/ → [xah] ('scar')
- /tl’uɮ/ → [tl’uh] ('rope')

== Loanwords ==
Debuccalization can be a feature of loanword phonology. For example, debuccalization can be seen in Indonesian loanwords into Selayar.

== Bibliography ==
- Cardona, George; Suthar, Babu (2003), "Gujarati", in Cardona, George; Jain, Dhanesh (eds.), The Indo-Aryan Languages, Routledge, ISBN 978-0-415-77294-5
- Kobayashi, Masato (2017), The Kurux Language: Grammar, Texts and Lexicon, BRILL, ISBN 9789004347663
- Krishnamurti, Bhadriraju (2003). The Dravidian Languages. Cambridge University Press. ISBN 978-0-521-77111-5.
- O'Brien, Jeremy Paul (2012), An experimental approach to debuccalization and supplementary gestures
- Rice, Keren (1989), A Grammar of Slave
