= Anioma Region =

Region in Niger Delta Region of Nigeria

Anioma

Total population
- 1,800,000 (est. 2022, 2,100,000) 2,100,000 (including those of ancestral descent)

Regions with significant populations
- Nigeria (Delta State, and Edo State)

Religion
- Predominantly Christian, minority African Traditional Religion

Related ethnic groups
- Bini, Esan, Igala, Olukumi, Isoko

The Anioma Region (/æˈniːɒmɑː/ ah-NEE-o-ma, US: /əˈniːɒmɑː/ uh-NEE-o-mah; Ndi Ániọ̀mà or Ndè Ániọ̀mà) of present day Delta State, Nigeria encompass and are native to the nine northern Local Government Areas of Delta State. Politically, the Anioma occupy the Delta North Senatorial District.

Today, the population of the Anioma region is estimated today to be at approximately 1.8 million. The largest settlement in Anioma and urban area is the Delta State Capital Territory, which incorporates the city of Asaba along the Niger River, with Okpanam, Igbuzor and surrounding communities. The Anioma region natively speak the Igboid languages, a Niger-Congo language, as well as several minority languages related to the cultures they lie contingent to.

== Etymology ==
The term Anioma is an acronym etymologically derived from the major ethnic groups that comprise the Delta North region flanking the western basin of the Niger in south central Nigeria: the Aniocha (A), Ndokwa (N), Ika (I) and the Oshimili peoples(O). The coinage was made in 1951 by Chief Dennis Osadebay, founding father of the Anioma state movement and has since remained the preferred indigenous name by which the people collectively refer to themselves.

== Language ==
Most of the Anioma people speak Igboid languages, primarily Enuani in the northeast, Ika in the northwest, and Ukwuani mostly spoken by the peoples of Ndokwa in the south.

Minorities historically exist with a Igala minority in the northernmost extremities of the Anioma homeland at Ebu on the border with Edo and Umuebu in Ukwuani, as well as the Olukumi who speak a language related to Yoruba of southwestern Nigeria and are acculturated to the predominant Enuani culture of Aniocha.

== The Ekumeku Movement (1883-1914) ==
See also Ekumeku Movement:

The Ekumeku War is unique in Anioma region history for two reasons. First, the movement's duration involved military campaigns spanning thirty-one years against the British. Secondly, it exemplifies an effort amongst the Anioma people to unify previously fragmented states in resistance to the British colonial army.

== Notable people ==
- Joseph "Hannibal" Achuzie, military personnel and civil war veteran
- Lucky Irabor Former Chief of Defense of Nigeria Military.
- Peter Nwaoboshi Former Senator of the Federal Republic of Nigeria
- Ifeanyi Okowa Former Senator of the Federal Republic of Nigeria and former Governor of Delta State, Nigeria 2015 - 2023
- Nduka Obaigbena Owner Arise TV and Radio
- Hanks Anuku, Veteran Nollywood actor
- Phillip Asiodu, former Minister of Federal Republic of Nigeria
- Maryam Babangida, wife of Former Nigerian Head of State, General Ibrahim Babangida
- Prof Joseph Chike Edozien, the Asagba of Asaba
- Sam Obi Former Member Delta State House of Assembly, Former Acting Governor of Delta State, Nigeria
- Baba Fryo Nigerian Musician
- Tony Elumelu, Chairman of Heirs Holdings, the United Bank for Africa, Transcorp and founder of The Tony Elumelu Foundation
- Air-Marshal Paul Dike, former Chief of Defence Staff of Nigeria NASA
- Buchi Emecheta, Nigerian-born British novelist
- Faze, Nigerian Musician
- Wilfred Ndidi, Footballer
- Elizabeth Isichei, prominent historian
- Alex Iwobi, football player
- Godwin Emefiele Former Governor of Central Bank of Nigeira
- Emmanuel Ibe Kachikwu, Minister of State for Petroleum
- Stephen Okechukwu Keshi, former Super Eagles captain and Malian National Football Team Coach
- Demas Nwoko, prominent Sculptor of Nigeria
- Ned Nwoko, present senator
- Nduka Odizor, former Lawn tennis player
- Timothy Ogene, writer
- Joy Ogwu, former managing director of Nigeria Institute of International Affairs
- Ngozi Okonjo-Iweala, the current Director-general of the World Trade Organization
- Austine "Jay-Jay" Okocha, former Captain of Super Eagles of Nigeria
- Sunday Oliseh, former Captain of super Eagles of Nigeria
- Lisa Omorodion, Nollywood Actress, producer and entrepreneur
- Dennis Osadebe, politician, poet, journalist and former premier of the now defunct Mid-Western Region of Nigeria, which now comprises Edo and Delta State.
- Zulu Sofola, the first published female Nigerian playwright and dramatist and first female Professor of Theater Arts in Africa.
- Nduka Ugbade, Nigeria's former football player and the first African to lift the world cup
- Patrick Utomi, Presidential Candidate and Founder of Lagos Business School
- Raph Uwechue, was a Nigerian minister, diplomat and publisher. He is a former president-general of the Ohanaeze Ndigbo, an Igbo socio-cultural organization in Nigeria
- Jay-Jay Okocha, Nigerian former footballer

== See also ==
- 1967 Asaba Massacre
- Edoid languages
- Ekumeku Movement
- Igala people
- Igboid languages
- Yoruboid languages
