= Olukumi =

Olukumi may refer to the following:

- Olukumi people
- Olukumi language (also spelled Ulukwumi)
