= Emmanuel Otteh =

Emmanuel Nwafor Otteh
- Bishop of Issele-Uku
- Church: Catholic Church
- Diocese: Diocese of Issele-Uku
- In office: 8 November 1996 – 14 November 2003
- Predecessor: Anthony Gbuji
- Successor: Michael Odogwu Elue
- Previous posts: Titular Bishop of Cova (1990-1996); Auxiliary Bishop of Onitsha (1990-1996)

Orders
- Ordination: 30 June 1961
- Consecration: 2 September 1990 by Francis Arinze

Personal details
- Born: 1 November 1927 Awkuzu, Onitsha Province, Colony and Protectorate of Nigeria, British Empire
- Died: 27 July 2012 (aged 84)

Emmanuel Nwafor Otteh (1 November 1927 – 27 July 2012) was a Nigerian Roman Catholic prelate.

Otteh was born in Nigeria and was ordained to the priesthood in 1961. He served as titular bishop of Cova and as the auxiliary bishop of the Roman Catholic Diocese of Onitsha, Nigeria, from 1990 to 1997 and as bishop of the Roman Catholic Diocese of Issele-Uku, Nigeria, from 1997 until his retirement in 2003.
