= Omagbemi =

- Gender: Male
- Language: Itsekiri

Origin
- Origin: Nigerian
- Meaning: I am protected by my child.
- Region of origin: South South, Nigeria

Omagbemi is a Nigerian surname. It is a male name and of Itsekiri origin, which means "I am protected by my child.".

== Notable individuals with the name ==
- Dudu Omagbemi (born 1985), Nigerian footballer
- James Omagbemi (1930–2012), Nigerian sprinter
- Victor Omagbemi (born 1967), Nigerian sprinter
- Mary Onyali-Omagbemi (born 1968), Nigerian sprinter, wife of Victor
