= Voiceless glottal fricative =

Consonantal sound represented by ⟨h⟩ in IPA

h

h͈
- IPA number: 146

Audio sample
- source · help

Encoding
- Entity (decimal): &#104;
- Unicode (hex): U+0068
- X-SAMPA: h
- Braille: ⠓ (braille pattern dots-125)
Image

Voiceless glottal approximant

h̞

A voiceless glottal fricative, sometimes called a voiceless glottal transition or an aspirate, is a type of sound used in some spoken languages. It is familiar to English-speakers as the "h" sound in "hut". The symbol in the International Phonetic Alphabet that represents this sound is ⟨h⟩.

A [h] sound may have real glottal constriction in a number of languages (such as Arabic), making it a true fricative. However, in many languages that have it, it only patterns like a fricative or approximant phonologically, and lacks the usual phonetic characteristics of a consonant. In such languages, [h] has no inherent place or manner of articulation, as well as lacking the height and backness of a vowel. Thus it has been described as neither consonant nor vowel but simply voiceless phonation:

[h and ɦ] have been described as voiceless or breathy voiced counterparts of the vowels that follow them [but] the shape of the vocal tract [...] is often simply that of the surrounding sounds. [...] Accordingly, in such cases it is more appropriate to regard h and ɦ as segments that have only a laryngeal specification, and are unmarked for all other features. There are other languages [such as Hebrew and Arabic] which show a more definite displacement of the formant frequencies for h, suggesting it has a [glottal] constriction associated with its production.

An effort was undertaken at the Kiel Convention in 1989 to move glottal fricatives, both voiceless and voiced, to the approximant cells of the IPA chart. A specifically fricative sound may be indicated with a raising diacritic ⟨h̝⟩, and a specifically approximant with a lowering diacritic ⟨h̞⟩.

The Shanghainese language, among others, contrasts voiced and voiceless glottal fricatives.

== Features ==
Features of the voiceless glottal fricative:

- In some languages, it has the constricted manner of articulation of a fricative. However, in many if not most it is a transitional state of the glottis or an approximant, with no manner of articulation other than its phonation type. Because there is no other constriction to produce friction in the vocal tract in the languages they are familiar with, many phoneticians no longer consider [h] to be a fricative. However, the term "fricative" is generally retained for historical reasons.
- It may have a glottal place of articulation. However, it may have no fricative articulation, in which case the term 'glottal' only refers to the nature of its phonation, and does not describe the location of the stricture nor the turbulence. All consonants except for the glottals, and all vowels, have an individual place of articulation in addition to the state of the glottis. As with all other consonants, surrounding vowels influence the pronunciation [h], and [h] has sometimes been presented as a voiceless vowel, having the place of articulation of these surrounding vowels.
- Its phonation is voiceless, which means it is produced without vibrations of the vocal cords. In some languages the vocal cords are actively separated, so it is always voiceless; in others the cords are lax, so that it may take on the voicing of adjacent sounds.
- It is an oral consonant, which means that air is not allowed to escape through the nose.
- Because the sound is not produced with airflow over the tongue, the median–lateral dichotomy does not apply.
- Its airstream mechanism is pulmonic, which means it is articulated by pushing air only with the intercostal muscles and abdominal muscles, as in most speech sounds.

== Occurrence ==
Language		Word	IPA	Meaning	Notes
Adyghe	Shapsug	хыгь (khyg')	[həɡʲ]	'now'	Corresponds to [x] in other dialects
Afar		daháb	[dʌhʌb]	'gold'	
Albanian		hire	[ˈhiɾɛ]	'the graces'	
Aleut		hanix̂	[ˈhaniχ]	'lake'	
Arabic	Modern Standard	هائل (haa'il)	[ˈhaːʔɪl]	'enormous'	See Arabic phonology
Assyrian	Eastern	ܗܝܡܢܘܬܐ (hèmanūta)	[heːmaːnuːta]	'faith'	
Assyrian	Western	ܗܪܟܗ (harcë)	[hεrcɪ]	'here'	
Armenian	Eastern	հայերեն (hayeren)	[hɑjɛɾɛn]	'Armenian language'	
Asturian	All dialects	guaḥe	[ɡwahɪ]	'kid'	
Asturian	South Central dialects	ḥuerza	[ˈhweɾθɐ]	'force'	Initial /f/ becomes [h] before -ue and -ui in South Central dialects. May be also realized as [ħ, ʕ, ɦ, x, χ]
Asturian	Eastern dialects	ḥacer	[haˈθeɾ]	"to do"	Initial /f/ becomes [h] in Eastern dialects. May be also realized as [ħ, ʕ, ɦ, x, χ]
Avar		гьа	[ha]	'oath'	
Azeri		hin	[hɪn]	'chicken coop'	
Basque	North-Eastern dialects	hirur	[hiɾur]	'three'	Can be voiced [ɦ] instead
Bengali		হাওয়া (haoua)	[hao̯a]	'wind'	
Berber		aherkus	[ahərkus]	'shoe'	
Breton		hirio	['hiɾjo]	'today'	
Blackfoot		ᑊᖳᐡᖹᖳ (hánnia!)	[hʌ́nːja]	'really!'	Allophone of /x/ when it occurs beginning of a word
Cantabrian		muḥer	[muˈheɾ]	'woman'	Initial /f/ becomes [h]. In most dialects, -LJ- and -C'L- too. May be also realized as [ħ, ʕ, ɦ, x, χ]
Catalan		ehem	[eˈhẽm]	'ahem'	Found in loanwords and interjections. See Catalan phonology
Chechen		хӏара (hara)	[hɑrɐ]	'this'	
Chinese	Cantonese	海 / hói	[hɔːi̯˧˥]	'sea'	See Cantonese phonology
Chinese	Taiwanese Mandarin	海 / hǎi	[haɪ̯˨˩˦]	'sea'	A velar fricative [x] for Standard Chinese. See Standard Chinese phonology
Danish		hus	[ˈhuːˀs]	'house'	Often voiced [ɦ] when between vowels. See Danish phonology
English		high	[haɪ̯]	'high'	See English phonology and H-dropping
Esperanto		hejmo	[ˈhejmo]	'home'	See Esperanto phonology
Eastern Lombard	Val Camonica	Bresa	[ˈbrɛha]	'Brescia'	Corresponds to /s/ in other varieties.
Estonian		hammas	[ˈhɑmˑɑs]	'tooth'	See Estonian phonology
Faroese		hon	[hoːn]	'she'	
Finnish		hammas	[ˈhɑmːɑs]	'tooth'	See Finnish phonology
French	Belgian	hotte	[hɔt]	'pannier'	Found in the region of Liège. See French phonology
Galician	Many dialects	gato	[ˈhätʊ]	'cat'	Found in Western, Central, and some Eastern dialects. Realization of /ɡ/ in some dialects. May be also realized as [ħ, ɦ, ʕ, x, χ, ʁ, ɡʰ]. See gheada
Georgian		ჰავა (hava)	[hɑvɑ]	'climate'	
German		Hass	[has]	'hatred'	See Standard German phonology
Greek	Cypriot	μαχαζί (mahazi)	[mahaˈzi]	'shop'	Allophone of /x/ before /a/
Hawaiian		haka	[ˈhɐkə]	'shelf'	See Hawaiian phonology
Hebrew		הַר (har)	[häʁ̞]	'mountain'	/h/ and other glottal consonants tend to elide. See Modern Hebrew phonology
Hindi	Standard	हम ('ham)	[ˈhəm]	'we'	See Hindustani phonology
Hmong		𖬎𖬰𖬟 (hawm)	[haɨ˨˩]	'to honor'	
Hungarian		helyes	[ˈhɛjɛʃ]	'right'	See Hungarian phonology
Irish		shroich	[hɾˠɪç]	'reached'	Appears as the lenited form of 'f', 's' and 't', as well as grammatical pre-aspiration of vowels, & occasionally word-initial as 'h' in borrowed words. See Irish phonology
Italian	Tuscan	i capitani	[iˌhäɸiˈθäːni]	'the captains'	Intervocalic allophone of /k/. See Italian phonology
Japanese		素肌 / suhada	[sɨᵝhada]	'bare skin'	See Japanese phonology
Javanese		ꦩꦲ (Maha)	[mɔhɔ]	'the expert, almighty one'	
Kabardian		тхылъхэ (tkhyl"khė)	[tχɪɬhɑ]	'books'	
Kazakh		шаһар (şahar)	[ʃahɑr]	'city'	
Khmer		ហឹរ (hœ̆r)	[hər]	'spicy'	See Khmer phonology
Khmer		ចាស់ (chăs)	[cah]	'old'	See Khmer phonology
Korean		허리 (heori)	[hʌɾi]	'waist'	See Korean phonology
Lakota		ho	[ho]	'voice'	
Lao		ຫ້າ (haa)	[haː˧˩]	'five'	
Leonese		guaje	[ˈwahe̞]	'boy'	
Lezgian		гьек (hek)	[hek]	'glue'	
Luxembourgish		hei	[hɑ̝ɪ̯]	'here'	See Luxembourgish phonology
Malay		hari	[hari]	'day'	
Malayalam		സഹകരണം (sahakaranam)	[sɐɦɐɡɐɾɐɳɐm]	'cooperation'	Only occurs in loanwords. See Malayalam phonology
Mutsun		hučekniš	[hut͡ʃɛkniʃ]	'dog'	
Navajo		hastiin	[hàsd̥ìːn]	'mister'	
Norwegian		hatt	[hɑtː]	'hat'	See Norwegian phonology
Pashto		هو (ho)	[ho]	'yes'	
Persian		هفت (haft)	[hæft]	'seven'	See Persian phonology
Pirahã		hi	[hì]	'he'	
Portuguese	Most dialects	Honda	[ˈhõ̞dɐ]	'Honda'	Allophone of /ʁ/. [h, ɦ] are marginal sounds to many speakers, particularly out of Brazil. See Portuguese phonology
Portuguese	Many Brazilian dialects	marreta	[maˈhetɐ]	'sledgehammer'	Allophone of /ʁ/. [h, ɦ] are marginal sounds to many speakers, particularly out of Brazil. See Portuguese phonology
Portuguese	Minas Gerais (mountain dialect)	arte	[ˈahtʃ]	'art'	Allophone of /ʁ/. [h, ɦ] are marginal sounds to many speakers, particularly out of Brazil. See Portuguese phonology
Portuguese	Colloquial Brazilian (some dialects)	chuvisco	[ɕuˈvihku]	'drizzle'	Corresponds to either /s/ or /ʃ/ (depending on dialect) in the syllable coda. Might also be deleted, See Portuguese phonology
Quechua	Standard	hatun	[hatuŋ]	'big'	The elderly still maintain the pronunciation of /h/, but the young changed the pronunciation to /x/. See Quechuan phonology
Romanian		hăț	[həts]	'bridle'	See Romanian phonology
Scottish Gaelic		ro-sheòl	[ɾɔˈhɔːɫ]	'topsail'	Lenited form of /t/, /s/, see Scottish Gaelic phonology
Serbo-Croatian	Croatian	hmelj	[hmê̞ʎ̟]	'hops'	Allophone of /x/ when it is initial in a consonant cluster. See Serbo-Croatian phonology
Spanish	Some Southern Peninsular, Canarian and Latin American dialects	harto	[ˈhäɾto̞]	'fed up'	Corresponds to Old Spanish /h/, which was developed from Latin /f/ but muted in other dialects. Often adapted into modern Spanish with ⟨j⟩. See Spanish phonology
Spanish	Some Southern Peninsular, Canarian and Latin American dialects	obispo	[o̞ˈβ̞ihpo̞]	'bishop'	Allophone of /s/ at the end of a syllable (see debuccalization). It may be elided ([∅]) in utterance final position or produce gemination if followed by a consonant ([o̞ˈβ̞ipːo̞]) in many regions across Latin America and Southern Spain. In Central Spain, it is often velar [x] ([o̞ˈβ̞ixpo̞]). See Spanish phonology
Spanish	Some Southern Peninsular, Canarian and Latin American dialects	jaca	[ˈhäkä]	'pony'	Mostly glottal in Andalusian (Western dialects), Canarian, Caribbean Spanish and partially in continental Latin American. Mostly velar in Eastern Andalusian and Murcian and parts of Latin American Spanish. Corresponds to /x/ (or even uvular /χ/) in Central and Northern Peninsular. See Spanish phonology
Swedish		hatt	[ˈhatː]	'hat'	See Swedish phonology
Sylheti		ꠢꠣꠝꠥꠇ (hamukh)	[hamux]	'snail'	
Tagalog		tahimik	[tɐˈhimɪk]	'quiet'	See Tagalog phonology
Tamil	Indian Tamil	பகை (pakai)	[pɐhɛ(i̯)]	'hate'	Intervocalic singular /k/ has debuccalized for most except in Brahmin and Sri Lankan Tamil. In total it can be [kʰ x ɡ ɣ ɣʰ h]
Tatar		һава (hawa)	[hawa]	'air'	See Tatar phonology
Telugu		పదిహేను (padihēnu)	[pɐd̪iheːnu]	'fifteen'	Rarely native, mostly in loanwords. See Telugu language#Phonology
Thai		ห้า (haa)	[haː˥˩]	'five'	
Turkish		halı	[häˈɫɯ]	'carpet'	See Turkish phonology
Ubykh		дуаха	[dwaha]	'prayer'	See Ubykh phonology
Ukrainian		кігті	[ˈkiht⁽ʲ⁾i]	'claws'	Sometimes when [ɦ] is devoiced. See Ukrainian phonology
Urdu	Standard	ہم (ham)	[ˈhəm]	'we'	See Hindi-Urdu phonology
Vietnamese		hiểu	[hjew˧˩˧]	'understand'	See Vietnamese phonology
Welsh		haul	[ˈhaɨl]	'sun'	See Welsh orthography
West Frisian		hoeke	[ˈhukə]	'corner'	
Yi		ꉐ / hxa	[ha˧]	'hundred'	

=== Nasal ===
Nasalized voiceless glottal approximant

h̃

Audio sample
- source · help

A nasalized voiceless glottal fricative or approximant is a type of consonantal sound used in some spoken languages. The symbol in the International Phonetic Alphabet that represents this sound is ⟨h̃⟩.

The /h/ sound is nasalized in several languages, apparently due to a connection between glottal and nasal sounds called rhinoglottophilia. Examples of languages where the only h-like sound is nasalized are Krim, Lisu, and Pirahã.

More rarely, a language will contrast oral /h/ and nasal /h̃/. Two such languages are neighboring Bantu languages of Angola and Namibia, Kwangali and Mbukushu. In these languages, vowels following /h̃/ are nasalized, though nasal vowels do not occur elsewhere. A distinction is also reported from Wolaytta, though in that case the nasal is rare. Swazi distinguishes /h, h̃, ɦ, ɦ̃/.

Language		Word	IPA	Meaning	Notes
Basque	Souletin dialect	ahate	[ãˈh̃ãte]	'duck'	
Carapana		hʉ̃gẽ́	[h̃ĩŋɛ̃́]	'god'	Allophone of [h] before nasal vowels.
Kaingang		hũg	[h̃ũŋ]	'hawk'	Possible word-initial realization of /h/ before a nasal vowel.
Kwangali		nhonho	[h̃õh̃õ]	Tribulus species	
Khoekhoegowab	Damara dialect	hû	[h̃ũː]	'six'	Free variation
Lisu	Northern dialect	han	[h̃a˧]	'soul'	
Lisu	Southern dialect	ꓦꓻ	[h̃ɑ˦]	'soul'	
Lizu		[h̃ũ˥˩]		'language'	Nasalization of glottals always occurs in glottal-initial words.
Swazi		nhinhiza	[h̃iɲh̃iza]	'to mumble'	Distinguishes /h, h̃, ɦ, ɦ̃/.
Tofa		иъһён	[iʔh̃jon]	'twenty'	

== See also ==
- Voiced glottal fricative
- Index of phonetics articles

== Notes ==
Place →	Labial					Coronal										Dorsal					Laryngeal			
Manner ↓	Bilabial		Labiodental		Linguolabial		Dental		Alveolar		Postalveolar		Retroflex		(Alveolo-)palatal		Velar		Uvular		Pharyngeal/epiglottal		Glottal	
Nasal	m̥	m	ɱ̊	ɱ		n̼	n̪̊	n̪	n̥	n	n̠̊	n̠	ɳ̊	ɳ	ɲ̊	ɲ	ŋ̊	ŋ	ɴ̥	ɴ				
Plosive	p	b	p̪	b̪	t̼	d̼	t̪	d̪	t	d			ʈ	ɖ	c	ɟ	k	ɡ	q	ɢ	ʡ		ʔ	
Sibilant affricate							t̪s̪	d̪z̪	ts	dz	t̠ʃ	d̠ʒ	tʂ	dʐ	tɕ	dʑ								
Non-sibilant affricate	pɸ	bβ	p̪f	b̪v			t̪θ	d̪ð	tɹ̝̊	dɹ̝	t̠ɹ̠̊˔	d̠ɹ̠˔			cç	ɟʝ	kx	ɡɣ	qχ	ɢʁ	ʡʜ	ʡʢ	ʔh	
Sibilant fricative							s̪	z̪	s	z	ʃ	ʒ	ʂ	ʐ	ɕ	ʑ								
Non-sibilant fricative	ɸ	β	f	v	θ̼	ð̼	θ	ð	θ̠	ð̠	ɹ̠̊˔	ɹ̠˔	ɻ̊˔	ɻ˔	ç	ʝ	x	ɣ	χ	ʁ	ħ	ʕ	h	ɦ
Approximant		β̞		ʋ				ð̞		ɹ		ɹ̠		ɻ		j		ɰ						˷
Tap/flap		ⱱ̟		ⱱ					ɾ̥	ɾ			ɽ̊	ɽ						ɢ̆		ʡ̆		
Trill	ʙ̥	ʙ							r̥	r		r̠	ɽ̊r̥	ɽr					ʀ̥	ʀ	ʜ	ʢ		
Lateral affricate									tɬ	dɮ			tꞎ	d𝼅	c𝼆	ɟʎ̝	k𝼄	ɡʟ̝						
Lateral fricative							ɬ̪		ɬ	ɮ			ꞎ	𝼅	𝼆	ʎ̝	𝼄	ʟ̝						
Lateral approximant								l̪	l̥	l		l̠	ɭ̊	ɭ	ʎ̥	ʎ	ʟ̥	ʟ		ʟ̠				
Lateral tap/flap									ɺ̥	ɺ			𝼈̊	𝼈		ʎ̆		ʟ̆						

		BL	LD	D	A	PA	RF	P	V	U
Implosive	Voiced	ɓ			ɗ		ᶑ	ʄ	ɠ	ʛ
Implosive	Voiceless	ɓ̥			ɗ̥		ᶑ̊	ʄ̊	ɠ̊	ʛ̥
Ejective	Stop	pʼ			tʼ		ʈʼ	cʼ	kʼ	qʼ
Ejective	Affricate		p̪fʼ	tθʼ	tsʼ	tʃʼ	tʂʼ	tɕʼ	kxʼ	qχʼ
Ejective	Fricative	ɸʼ	fʼ	θʼ	sʼ	ʃʼ	ʂʼ	ɕʼ	xʼ	χʼ
Ejective	Lateral affricate				tɬʼ			c𝼆ʼ	k𝼄ʼ	q𝼄ʼ
Ejective	Lateral fricative				ɬʼ					
Click (top: velar; bottom: uvular)	Tenuis	kʘ qʘ		kǀ qǀ	kǃ qǃ		k𝼊 q𝼊	kǂ qǂ		
Click (top: velar; bottom: uvular)	Voiced	ɡʘ ɢʘ		ɡǀ ɢǀ	ɡǃ ɢǃ		ɡ𝼊 ɢ𝼊	ɡǂ ɢǂ		
Click (top: velar; bottom: uvular)	Nasal	ŋʘ ɴʘ		ŋǀ ɴǀ	ŋǃ ɴǃ		ŋ𝼊 ɴ𝼊	ŋǂ ɴǂ	ʞ	
Click (top: velar; bottom: uvular)	Tenuis lateral				kǁ qǁ					
Click (top: velar; bottom: uvular)	Voiced lateral				ɡǁ ɢǁ					
Click (top: velar; bottom: uvular)	Nasal lateral				ŋǁ ɴǁ					
