= Ogugu =

Ethnic group in Nigeria

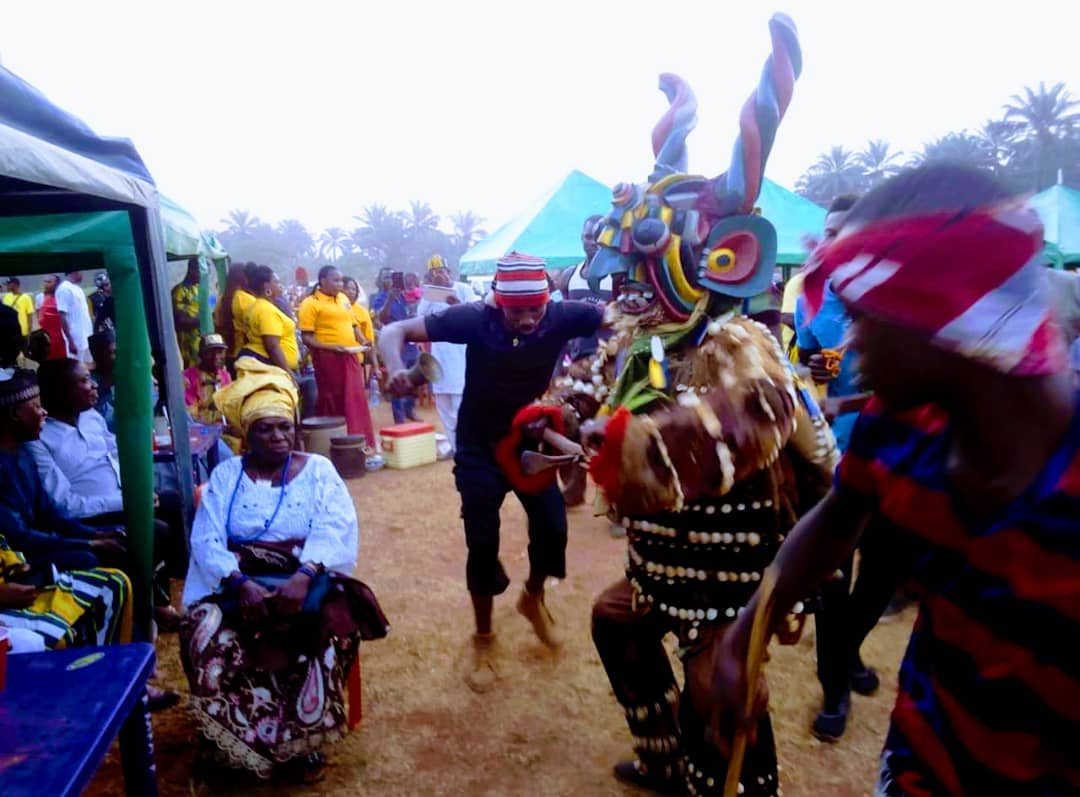
People dancing with the masquerade during the 2018 ofante ogugu cultural carnival

Ogugu is a community of Igala-speaking people in the Olamaboro Local Government Area of the Kogi State in north central Nigeria.

== Cultural belief system ==
Ogugu people have a culture that has been misunderstood by other Igalas. It is called Ibegwu, literally meaning ancestors. It is believed that ancestors watch over their progeny to stop them from doing mischief. For instance, an Ogugu man can not be a party to premeditated murder. He would be 'arrested' by Ibegwu. He would be struck by some mysterious ailment, the cure to which is a public confession and performance of the necessary rituals for cleansing. According to the ancestral rules, a married woman cannot have an affair with any other man. The same punishment cited above applies. Some have argued that if a man has the liberty to flirt, a woman should also have the same right. They are predominantly subsistence farmers. Ibegwu culture is all encompassing to a woman. She is expected to be submissive to her husband in all aspect and everything she does must be with his consent.

Onoja Oboni's personality and heritage has been shrouded in mythical imagery over time.

There is a place called Unyi-Ogugu. This is where Ogugu originated from. It is located between two states, Enugu state and Benue State.
