= Illah =

- Location in Nigeria
- Coordinates: 6°25′26″N 6°38′56″E
- Country: Nigeria
- State: Delta State

Government
  - Type: Parliamentarian, Monarchical
  - Ogbelani of Illah: HRM (Obi) Sylvester Olisadunkwu Enechaziam Jugai (S.O Jugai)
- Time zone: GMT (+1)
- National language: Igbo

Illah is a small town located on the bank of the River Niger, in Oshimili North Local Government Area of Delta State of Nigeria. It is situated on a table-land, some twenty-five kilometres north of Asaba, the State capital. Illah is one of the Igbo-speaking towns in Delta State, whose people belong to the Igbo Ethnic group who are often referred to as Anioma people or Delta Igbos.

Illah has as her immediate neighbours, Ebu to the North, Asaba and Ugbolu to the South, Akwukwu-Igbo to the West and the majestic River Niger to the East. The town is made up of Nine villages, namely Umuagwu, Umutei, Ajaji, Ukwumege, Umutedem, Onya, Ukpologwu, , Ogbe-Olu and Ogbe-Orji.

== Origins ==
The Illah people trace their origin to three different sources. The three sources of ethnic descent which the Illah people lay claim to include Igbo, Igala and Benin:

(i) The Igbo Descendants: Umuagwu, Umutei, Ajaji, Umutedem, Onya,

and Ogbe-Orji

(ii) The Igala Descendants: Ukpologwu, Ogbe-Olu

(iii) The Benin Descendants: Ukwumege

1. The Igbo Origin

(i) Umutei-Edem, Umutei, Ajaji and Umuagwu

These four quarters were the first to settle at Illah. They are assumed to be of Igbo extraction, even though according to oral tradition, it was their mother who was Igala, while their father was of igbo origin from agukwu nri

A plausible version of the town's oral tradition claims that a man called Ifikuanim Eri, who was the second son of his father's children, had several children, among whom was Ika-Eri, who founded Omo-Ika-Iberi, (meaning ‘the market of a man called Ika of Eri’). The name Omo-Ika-Iberi metamorphosed into what became known as Itormorka, which the Illah people recognise today as the original land occupied by their ancestors, the first settlers in the town.

Eri had a son called Illah, who, in turn, begot five children from his two wives. The first wife begot Edem, Utei, and Nwabukwu (Ajaji), while his second wife had two children for him: Iyagbo and Agwu. These children eventually became the founders of the different villages which bear their names.

However, owing to the insecure nature of the river bank dwelling, where they were incessantly attacked by aggressors from across the River Niger on the eastern flank, the five brothers moved inland to a more secure place. On arrival at the place, they chased away the Ukala people who they met there, and named the place “Ala amaka”, which in Igbo means “This land is very good”. The name was subsequently shortened to Ala (meaning “this land”), a name that was ultimately corrupted by the white man to become IIlah, its present name.

(ii) Onyah Quarter

The Onyah people, who arrived in Illah much later, are said to have come into Illah from Osamele, a town in the Ogbaru Local Government Area, of the present day Anambra State. Led by Prince Ogwu, the heir apparent whose ascent to the throne was being frustrated by the father’s longevity, decided to found his own territory to rule. In this attempt, he clashed with Edaiken at Omorka. The two war lords, however, struck an agreement whereby Ogwu was allowed to settle at the Illah waterside (Otu-Eke) and rule over an autonomous community there. He was to cooperate with Illah in terms of providing security for Illah from that axis. The Igbo connection of this group is evident, given the fact that they migrated from their native Osamele, an Igbo town.

(iii) Ogbe-Orji

The people of descended from an Igbo man, by name Chika, who is believed to have founded the village. Chika was a brother-in-law to Ugbe, who was Chijulu’s first son. He married Chika’s sister and eventually decided to settle at Illah, where he was very welcome. According to oral tradition, Chika decided to plant an iroko tree (Orji tree) in the area allocated to him by the Illah people, as a signpost, to guide his relations from the East, whenever they came to visit him in his new abode.

2. The Benin Origin

The Ukwumege people of Illah lay claim to Benin descent. According to oral tradition, they are said to have descended from Edaiken, a Prince of the Ancient Benin kingdom. In the course of Edaiken's adventures from Benin towards the Eastern boundaries, he arrived at Illah, where the five co-founders of the town (Edem, Utei, Nwabukwu and Agwu), pleaded with him to assist them in overcoming, once and for all, their enemies from across the River Niger, in their eastern boundary, who had not stopped terrorising them ever since they settled on Illah soil. Edaiken, accepted the assignment, and having successfully executed the task of defending the Illah people against heir aggressors, was given an area of the town to settle, so that he could continue to defend the town. It is this quarter that became known as Ukwumege.

3. The Igala Origin

Two groups of settlers in Illah are of Igala descent. These are the Ukpologwu and the Ogbe-Olu people.

(i) Ukpologwu Quarter

The Ukpologwu people arrived in Illah before the Ogbe-Olu people. According to oral tradition, Ukpologwu was founded by Ogwu, the crown prince of Igalaland who was not allowed to succeed his father as the Attah of Igalaland, because he did not have a male child. Out of frustration, he went on self exile in Igalaland known as Ode-Ukpologwu. In a bid to further distance himself from the humiliation he was facing, he travelled down along the River Niger until he arrived at Omorka where he was received and accommodated by the four brothers who were the first to settle there. He thus settled there and founded the village known as Ukpologwu in Illah today.

(ii) Ogbe-Olu Quarter

Just like the Ukpologwu people, the Ogbe-Olu people trace their origin from Igalaland. They were, however led to Illah by an Igala prince called Akinjogula who is their progenitor.

== Government ==
Illah operates a gerontocracy, a system of government that confers leadership on the oldest people in the community. The town is governed by a Council known as the Ogbelani-in-Council, and presided over by the oldest Obi, who is the Obi Ogbelani of the town.

Each of the nine villages is headed by the oldest male, who thus occupies the position of Diokpa Ogbe. In the case of Ukwumege village, the oldest man becomes not only the Diokpa but, at same time, occupies the position of the Iyase of Illah. As Iyase, he automatically assumes the position of, and exercises the function of, the Prime Minister of the town. The Ogbelani-in-Council is made up of nominated representatives of the various villages in Illah.

== Economy ==
Traditionally, Illah people are subsistence farmers and fishermen; they equally engage in trading, particularly with their eastern neighbours, with whom they trade notably in yams, rice and fish. The town thrives essentially as a middle market for traders from the hinterland towns, who come down to Illah to purchase these commodities. On specific market days, traders from outside Illah throng the Illah coastal markets to buy large quantities of yams, fish and other food commodities.

In colonial times, Illah served as a strategic trade post in that part of the State, thanks to its geographic location on the coast of the River Niger, which enabled it to host the boat services provided by the United Africa Company (U.A.C.). Travellers from the hinterland, who wanted to go the Northern parts of the country, usually availed themselves of the boat services at Illah, which took them to such towns as Baro and Lokoja.

== Religious beliefs ==
Illah was, in the distant past, a town of traditional religion worshippers. Today, a sizeable proportion of the populace still engage in traditional religious worship. The arrival of Christian missionaries in the town towards the end of the nineteenth century began to change the worship pattern of Illah people. The Roman Catholic Church was the first to arrive the town, in the 1880s, and by 1904, the construction of the first church in the town was already completed. Today, over 80% of the Illah people are acclaimed Christians of various denominations, with the larger majority professing the Catholic faith.

== Tradition and culture ==
Illah people have a high regard for their tradition and culture. One major area where the regard for culture and tradition is manifested among the Illah people is

in respect of traditional title-taking. Such titles include major ones like the Alor title and the Ichinmo title. The Alor title, which is the highest title of the land, is particularly revered by the Illah people, as it attracts considerable respect from the people. No Illah person is expected to take this title if his father is still alive. Cultural festivities, which include in particular the annual New Yam Festival (Emime), are warmly observed among the Illah people. The love for their culture and tradition is so high among the Illah people that despite the high level of enlightenment achieved by the people, they have remained essentially a culture-loving people.

== Contribution to national growth ==
Illah, having embraced western education early, has produced numbers of dedicated citizens who have contributed in various ways to national life and growth. The town continues to make giant strides in various areas of endeavour in the course of the development.
