= Issele Ukwu =

Issele-Uku
- Location in Nigeria
- Coordinates: 6°19′11.98″N 6°28′36.65″E
- Country: Nigeria
- State: Delta State
- Local Government Area: Aniocha North

Government
  - Obi: Agbogidi Obi Nduka (MNSE)
- Time zone: UTC+1 (WAT)
- Postcode: 320110

Issele-Ukwu or Issele-Uku (Isi-Ele-ukwu meaning "A superior big land" ), is a historic town in Nigeria's Delta State and headquarters for the Local Government Area of Aniocha North. It is also the Episcopal See of the Bishop of the Roman Catholic Diocese of Issele-Uku. It has its own post office and is served by the nearby new Asaba International Airport.

== History ==
Issele-Uku( “isi-ele-ukwu” meaning “A superior big land” ) is originally an Igbo settlement dated before 1230AD. The Kingdom still reflects its original Igbo culture through its dialect of the Igbo language just like every typical Igbo community with a distinct intelligible dialect. It’s Iwa ji festival is considered the most significant cultural/Festival gathering in Delta State of Nigeria which marks the beginning of a new year in accordance with the Igbo ancient calendar of 4 days per week “eke, Orie, Afor, Nkwo” .The town is in present-day Delta State. The Issele-uku Association of North America has written a brief history of this area including an explanation of the origin of the name of the city. Queen Annabelle's village.Issele-Uku has a long history associated with the Anioma people and the ancient Benin Kingdom. Traditional accounts connect its royal dynasty to migrations from Benin, although different narratives exist about the community's earliest inhabitants and origins. Its traditional ruler bears the title Obi, and the monarchy remains an important institution in the town's cultural identity.
