= Edekiri languages =

Branch of the Yoruboid Languages

Edekiri
- Geographic distribution: Togo, Benin and Nigeria
- Linguistic classification: Niger–Congo?: Atlantic–Congo; Volta–Niger; yeai; Yoruboid; Edekiri
- Subdivisions: Ede; Itsekiri; Mokole; Ulukwumi; Yoruba

Language codes
- Glottolog: edek1238

The Edekiri is a group of languages in the Volta-Niger branch of the Niger-Congo family. The Niger-Congo language family, and by extension the Edekiri languages, formed a cohesive linguistic unit as far back as the end of the Upper Paleolithic 11,000 years ago.

The group includes:

- the Ede dialect cluster, including Ife
- Itsekiri
- Lucumi language, which is spoken in Cuba
- the Nago languages
- the Yoruboid languages Ulukwumi and Mokole
- Yoruba, with approximately 40 million speakers in Nigeria and several million more in the diaspora.

== See also ==
- Yoruboid languages
