= Proto-Yoruboid language =

Reconstructed language

Proto-Yoruboid
- Reconstruction of: Yoruboid languages
- Region: Confluence of the Niger and Benue rivers
- Era: c. 2500 BCE – c. 300 BCE
- Reconstructed ancestor: Proto-Defoid; Proto-YEAI; Proto-Niger–Congo

Proto-Yoruboid is the reconstructed common ancestor of the Yoruboid languages, a subgroup of the Volta-Niger languages. It was likely spoken in what is now Nigeria and the confluence of the Niger River and Benue River. The ancestors of the Proto-Yoruboid speakers lived in the southern part of the Niger River Valley region for over three millennia. It split off from its neighbors in Volta-Niger about 3,000 years ago during a time of westward migration.

== Overview ==
Proto-Yoruboid was likely part of a larger dialectal continuum. Several theories have been created to explain how the language later broke up into its modern descendants, usually identifying 300 BC as the time in which a major climate crisis lasting from the fourth century BC to the third century AD across West Africa, forced Proto-Yoruboid speakers to migrate westward and southward, forming the modern Proto-language communities of the Itsekiri people, Igala people, and Yoruba people, into Proto-Igala, and Proto-Edekiri (ancestor of the Ede languages including the Yoruba).

The language was closely related to the ancestor of the Akoko language (Proto-Akokoid) and Ayere-Ahan languages, where it perhaps formed a dialect of an older language. Some older linguistic sources identify this ancestor of Proto-Yoruboid as a language known as Proto-Defoid, which attempts to merge Yoruboid with Akokoid and Ayere-Ahan, and is still widely cited in research; however, there is still insufficient data to suggest the existence of the language. Other close relatives include Proto-Edoid, Proto-Igboid, and Proto-Nupoid.

Like other proto-languages, there is no record of Proto-Yoruboid. Its words and pronunciation have been reconstructed by linguists and historians. From the common vocabulary which has been reconstructed on the basis of present-day Yoruboid languages, it appears that agriculture, including the cultivation of yam, palm trees (including the production of palm oil), melons, and raffia palms, hunting, fishing along the Niger-River was integral to the culture of the speakers of Proto-Yoruboid, and they had developed iron-working technologies quite early, before the wide use of bronze. Iron smelting and forging technologies may have existed in West Africa among the Nok culture of Nigeria as early as the sixth century BC.

Like its modern descendants, Proto-Yoruboid was a tonal language consisting of a three-tone system. It had lost its systematic noun-class structure that was present in earlier ancestors, and preserved in distant relatives like Proto-Bantu, but remnants of the system can still be seen.

Most linguists accept the existence of a Proto-Yoruboid language as there are strong genetic relationships between the descendant languages. The exact ways descendant languages came to be after the migration of Proto-Yoruboid is still debated, for example, the classification of Itsekiri as its own branch of Proto-Yoruboid or simply a more divergent dialect in the Proto-Yoruba group. For many years, Proto-Yoruboid was classified within the Kwa languages along with Akan and other languages, and later as a Benue-Congo language but has since classified among the Volta-Niger languages along with Igbo, Edo, and the Gbe languages of Benin. Many historians who have studied the Nok culture suggest that as a candidate for the speakers of Proto-Yoruboid, or at least close relatives of the Proto-Yoruboid people.

== Urheimat ==
The Proto-Yoruboid homeland was likely the region of the confluence of the Niger and Benue rivers in what is now Southern Nigeria, where speakers of Yoruboid languages still reside. While many Yoruboid groups associate the origin of their culture and civilization from the town of Ife, Proto-Yoruboid speakers almost certainly did not live anywhere near modern Ile-Ife. Reconstruction of terms for crocodile, crab, canoe/boat, as well as a common term for big river (often being synonymous with the Niger River), makes it clear that the Proto-Yoruboid people were riverine.

== Phonology ==
The phonology of the Proto-Yoruboid language has not been widely researched, but it is clear that it had an expanded number of consonants and vowels than most of descendant languages. Consonant charts for related languages and Proto West-Benue-Congo (an outdated form of a Proto-Yoruboid ancestor) have been proposed. The wide existence of allophony in descendant languages, especially among vowels, makes it difficult in determining which consonants were specifically used.

=== Consonants ===
Type	Labial	Alveolar	Postalveolar	Palatal	Velar	Labial-velar	Labiovelar
Nasal	*m	*n		*ɲ		*ŋm	
Plosive	*p, *b, bʲ	*t, *d		*c	*k, *g	*kp, *gb	*kʷ *gʷ
Affricate			*dʒ				
Fricative		*s	*ʃ		*ɣ		
Implosive	*ɓ	*ɗ					
Trill		*r					
Aproximant		*l		*j			*w

=== Vowels ===
Controversy exists among linguists on whether Proto-Yoruboid had an expanded nine-vowel system (a, e, ɛ, ɪ, i, ɔ, o, ʊ, u), with nasal equivalents, retained in some Yoruboid dialects like Ekiti dialect of Yoruba, or rather a seven-vowel system (a, ɛ, e, i, ɔ, o, u), with nasal equivalents, which are seen in most of the descendants of Proto-Yoruboid including Yoruba. Most reconstructions support the existence of the nine-vowel system which is quite widespread in other Niger-Congo languages, for a total of fifteen vowels.

Type	Front	Center	Back
Close	i, ĩ		u, ũ
Near-close	ɪ, ɪ̃		ʊ, ʊ̃
Mid	e, ɛ, ɛ̃		o, ɔ, ɔ̃
Open		a	

The above phonemes exhibited considerable allophony, and the exact realisation of many of them is unclear.

=== Vocabulary ===
See also the Proto-Yoruboid word list on Wiktionary.

The Proto-Yoruboid vocabulary has been partly reconstructed, but often differs widely as most reconstructed lists were devised in the 1970s and 1980s, when many of the classifications of the Yoruba were based on work by Diedrich Westermann and other early linguists on the African language.

Proto-Yoruboid had a relatively poor morphology not as extensive as those of its modern descendants. It largely consisted of bisyllabic verbs with vowel roots that served as nominalization prefixes, and may be remnant of a noun class structure found in Volta-Congo.
