= Gheada =

Galician phonetic feature

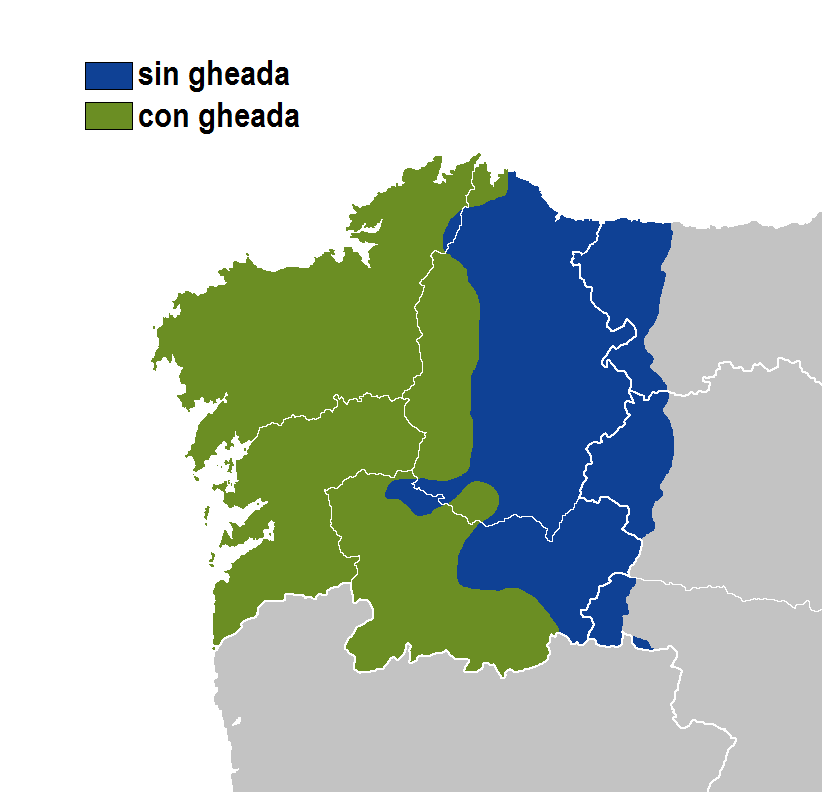
Gheada No gheada

Gheada (IPA: [ħeˈaðɐ]) is a term in Galician to describe the debuccalisation of the voiced velar stop /ɡ/ to a, usually voiceless, back fricative, most often a voiceless pharyngeal fricative [ħ].

Although it is found throughout Galicia, its use is declining in Lugo and eastern Ourense, and it is rarely encountered in education or broadcasting. While it is neither considered incorrect nor stigmatised, it is generally considered appropriate only for familiar rather than formal domains.

Occasionally, the sound is articulated as a voiceless velar fricative [x], as in Castilian jamón.

== Orthography ==
The pronunciation is sometimes indicated by the digraph gh:

- gato (IPA: [ˈɡatʊ]; "cat") > ghato [ˈħatʊ]
- pago (IPA: [ˈpaɣʊ]; "payment") > pagho [ˈpaħʊ]

== Phonetic realizations ==
Pharyngeal realizations of the gheada are the most common, but there's considerable variation. Speakers from inland villages tend to prefer uvular, pharyngeal, or glottal fricatives, which are often voiced between vowels. In contrast, speakers from coastal villages prefer velar, pharyngeal, or occasional uvular fricatives, which are always voiceless.

== Possible systems ==
There are three different systems of gheada. In the most widespread one, /g/ is pronounced as a voiceless fricative in any position. For example:

gato [hato] 'cat'
un gato [uŋhato] 'a cat'
o gato [ohato] 'the cat'
domingo [domiŋho] 'Sunday'

This system is found in the major cities of Galicia: Santiago, Pontevedra, and A Coruña, as well as in the eastern part of the Province of A Coruña.

Another system has both [g] and voiceless fricative allophones:

gato [hato] 'cat'
un gato [uŋhato] 'a cat'
o gato [ohato] 'the cat'
domingo [domiŋgo] 'Sunday'

In this system, found in the western parts of Ourense and Lugo, northern areas of Pontevedra, and south-eastern areas of A Coruña, [g] is only found after a nasal consonant in the middle of words. Speakers often have trouble recognizing [g] and [h] as allophones of the same phoneme.

A third system has merged -/ng/- into -/nk/-, eliminating the [g] allophone completely:

gato [hato] 'cat'
un gato [uŋhato] 'a cat'
o gato [ohato] 'the cat'
domingo [domiŋko] 'Sunday'

This system is found in the western parts of Galicia, in Fisterra and the Ría de Muros.

== See also ==
- Phonological history of Spanish coronal fricatives
- Lenition

== Sources ==
- Labraña-Barrero, Sabela; van Oosterzee, Carlos (2003). "An Acoustic Approach to Galician Gheada" (PDF). In Solé, M. J.; Recasens, D.; Romero, J. (eds.). Proceedings of the 15th International Congress of Phonetic Sciences. 15th International Congress of Phonetic Sciences. Barcelona: Universitat Autónoma de Barcelona. pp. 945–948. ISBN 1-876346-48-5.
- Thomas, Juan Antonio (2007). "The Use of Gheada in Three Generations of Women from Carballo, A Coruña" (PDF). In Holmquist, Jonathan; Lorenzino, Augusto; Sayahi, Lotfi (eds.). Selected Proceedings of the Third Workshop on Spanish Sociolinguistics. Somerville, MA: Cascadilla Proceedings Project. pp. 61–73. ISBN 978-1-57473-418-8.
