= Michael Odogwu Elue =

Most Reverend Dr. Michael Odogwu Elue
- Diocese: Roman Catholic Diocese of Issele-Uku

Orders
- Ordination: August 18, 1984
- Consecration: February 21, 2004 by Anthony Olubunmi Cardinal Okogie

Personal details
- Born: April 4, 1956 (age 70) Akumazi Umuocha, Delta State, Nigeria
- Denomination: Roman Catholic
- Parents: Dominic and Theresa Elue

Styles of Michael Odogwu Elue
- Reference style: His Excellency
- Spoken style: Your Excellency
- Religious style: Bishop

Most Reverend Michael Odogwu Elue (born April 4, 1956), into a Catholic family of Mr. Dominic Elue and Mrs. Theresa Elue of Akumazi Umuocha in Ika Northeast Local Government Area of Delta State, Nigeria. He is the first son and the second child in the family of eight children. His father died on August 18, 1984, the very day he was ordained to the Catholic priesthood.

Before his episcopal ordination as the third bishop of Issele-Uku diocese, on February 21, 2004, Bishop Odogwu held many pastoral and academic assignments of responsibility. Prominent among them were as Professor at All Saints Major Seminary Ekpoma, Nigeria, chaplain for inter-Religious Dialogue, member of liturgical commission to mention but a few. Bishop Odogwu holds Doctorate degree on Biblical theology from the University of Jerusalem and Rome.

== See also ==
- Roman Catholicism in Nigeria
- List of Roman Catholic dioceses in Nigeria
