= Ugboba =

Settlement in Nigeria

Ugboba is a town in Aniocha North Local Government Area, Delta State, Nigeria. It is bordered by Ohordua, Ubulubu, Obompka, Ukwu-Nzu and Ugbodu in the north, north-east, east, south-east and south respectively. The community is currently governed by its 10th monarch, HRM Obi Ezedimbu Nkebakwu III, who was given a staff of office by the Delta State Government on 2 June 2016.
