= Obomkpa =

Town in Delta State, Nigeria

Obomkpa is an Igbo town in the Aniocha North local government area of Delta State, Nigeria.

== History ==
Obomkpa community was founded by Anagbanogidi some centuries ago and situated within the geographical coordinates of 6°24′55″N 6°29′29″E/6.41528°N 6.49139°E which consist of the following major Quarters namely; Ogbe-Obi, Ogbe-Onei and Ukpatu respectively. It is one of the communities that make up the Umu-Ezechima clan.

Anagbanogidi who migrated from the ancient city of Bini became the first Obi {paramount ruler} of Obomkpa.

At present, Obomkpa is an important community in the Aniocha North Local Government Area of Delta State. It is bounded in the South by Ubulubu town, in the North by Idumuogo town, in the East by Ukwunzu town, in the West by Ugboba town, in the Northwest by Onicha-Olona and in the Southeast by Ezi town etc.

Obomkpa community operates a Monarchical Type of Government, which is headed by His Royal Majesty (The Obi), followed by the Obi in Council, Council of Chiefs, Red Cap Chiefs, Heads of Villages and Head of quarters. The Kingship is based on the system of Primogeniture i.e. From Father to Son (Eze-Ada).

The major occupations of the people in Obomkpa are Farming, Hunting and Petty Trading. The community has produced Sons and Daughters who has excelled in Various fields of human endeavors and are based in Different parts of the country and in Diaspora.

== Geography ==
=== Rivers ===
- Iyi-Nkpukpa
- Iyi-Odo
- Iyi-Nem-agdi
- Iyi-ilo
- Iyi-nta
- Iyi Ako
- Iyi-Ocha
- Owuwu
- Iyi Okwu-suno
- Oji-Okpa

== Food ==
Obomkpa is traditionally known to have the following types of food:

- Nni-ji (Pounded yam)
- Nni-akpu (Fufu)
- Ofe Ujuju
- Ofe Nsala
- Ofe Aku (Ofe Ose, Banga soup)
- Ose-Okwa
- Ofe Uliome
- Ofe Agbono
- Ofe Egusi
- Ofe mkpakwo (Vegetable soup)
- Akpaka
- Ukpoka

== Names of the Obis from past to present ==
- Obi Anagbanogidi (1598 – 1630, 42 years)
- Obi Ado (1630 – 1675, 45 years)
- Obi Onalo (1675 – 1715, 40 years)
- Obi Ngwuogiliga (1715 – 1745, 30 years)
- Obi Obome (1745 – 1770, 25 years)
- Obi Uya (1770 – 1804, 34 years)
- Obi Usifo (1804 – 1863, 59 years)
- Obi Dibie (1863 – 1903, 40 years)
- Obi Chidi (1903 – 1943, 40 years)
- Obi Nsuebo (1943 – 1955, 12 years)
- Obi Ezeka (1955 – 2006, 52 years)
- Obi Jonathan (2006 – 2017, 11 years)
- Obi Onyemaechi Josiah Kanyinaga I (2017 – present)

== Major features of the community ==
=== Government-owned establishments ===
- Obomkpa (Mixed) Secondary School
- Anagba Primary School, Obomkpa
- Ofunne Primary School, Obomkpa
- Primary Health Centre, Obomkpa
- Post Office
- Obi's Punch

==== Community establishments ====
- Obi's Palace
- Obomkpa Youths Vocational centre

==== Festivals ====
- Egwu-Afa
- Ine/Idu-Olu
- Iti-Ubi
- Iwa-ji (New Yam Festival)

== Religion ==
=== Churches ===
- Sacred Heart Catholic Church
- ST. Stephen Anglican Church
- Baptists Church
- Cherubim And Seraphim Church
- Jehovah Witness
- Pure Gold Int’l Ministry
- Living Word Gospel Mission
- Redeem Christian Church of God (RCCG)
- Living Faith (Winners)
- Mountain of Fire Ministry (etc.)

=== Gods ===
- Iwu Anagba
- Obunebu
- Iwu- Afa
- Iwu-Ani Ogbe-Onei
