= Ohordua =

Town in Edo State, Nigeria

Coordinates: 6.527°N 6.410°E

Ohordua is a town in Esan South East Local Government Area, Edo State, Nigeria. It is located about 193 mi (310 km) southwest of the LGA's capital, Ubiaja.
