= Ede language =

Edekiri dialect continuum of Benin and Togo

Ede
- Native to: Benin, Togo
- Native speakers: (800,000 cited 1990–2006)
- Language family: Niger–Congo?: Atlantic–Congo; Volta–Niger; yeai; Yoruboid; Edekiri; Ede

Official status
- Recognised minority language in: Benin

Language codes
- ISO 639-3: Variously: cbj – Cabe (Caabe) ica – Ica idd – Idaca (Idaaca) ijj – Ije nqg – Nago (Nagot) nqk – Kura Nago xkb – Manigri (Kambolé) ife – Ifɛ
- Glottolog: edea1234 Ede; includes Yoruba

Ede is a dialect continuum of Benin and Togo that is closely related to the Yoruba language. The best-known variety is Ife.

Kluge (2011) includes Yoruba within Ede.

The Ede dialects include Ede Cabe (Caabe, Shabè), Ede Ica (Itcha, Isha), Ede Idaca (Idaaca, Idaatcha), Ede Ije, Ede Nago (Nagot), Ede Kura Nago, Ede Manigri (Kambolé), and Ede Ife.
