= Ekumeku Movement =

Colonial opposition movements

Date	1883–1914
Location	Nigeria
Result	British victory
Territorial changes	Establishment of the Southern Nigeria Protectorate

Belligerents
(United Kingdom) British Empire	Ekumeku organisation

Commanders and leaders
Major Festing, W. E. B. Crawford Coupland, Lt. Col. H. c. Moorhouse, S. O. Crewe	Dunkwu Isusu of Onicha-Olona, Maya nwa Isusu of Onicha-Olona, Ikwa Gwadia of Onicha-Olona, Ochei nwa Aghaeze of Onicha-Olona, Elumelu Okachi of Onicha-Olona, Nwabuzo Iyogolo, Awuno Ugbo, Nzekwe, Agbambu nwa Oshue of Igbuzo, Idabor of Issele-Ukwu, Abuzu of Idumuje-Unor, Idegwu Otokpoike of Ubulu-Ukwu, Ochie Agodi, Agbambu Oshue, Chidi Nwaoji etc

Strength
Hundreds of soldiers	Hundreds of Ekemeku members

Casualties and losses
Minor	Minor with mass imprisonment

The Ekumeku Movement consisted of a series of uprisings against the rising power of the Royal Niger Company of the British Empire by Anioma Igbo people. The British penetration of Nigeria met with various forms of resistance throughout the country. In the south, the British had to fight many wars.

== Bibliography ==
- Igbafe, Philip A. (July 1971). "Western Ibo Society and its Resistance to British Rule: The Ekumeku Movement 1898–1911". The Journal of African History. 12 (3). Cambridge University Press: 441–459. doi:10.1017/s0021853700010872. S2CID 153829516.
- Ohadike, Don C. (1991). The Ekumeku Movement: Western Igbo Resistance to the British Conquest of Nigeria, 1883-1914. Ohio University Press. ISBN 978-0821409855.
- Iweze, Daniel Olisa (2016). "The Role of Indigenous Collaborators during the Anglo-Ekumeku War of 1898-1911". Ufahamu: A Journal of African Studies. 39 (1). University of California: 90–97. doi:10.5070/F7391029819.
