= Igala language =

Yoruboid language of Nigeria

Igala
- Native to: Nigeria
- Ethnicity: Igala
- Native speakers: 1.6 million (2020)
- Language family: Niger–Congo?: Atlantic–Congo; Volta-Congo; Volta–Niger; yeai; Yoruboid; Igala
- Writing system: Latin

Language codes
- ISO 639-3: igl
- Glottolog: igal1242

Igala is a Yoruboid language, spoken by the Igala ethnic group of Nigeria. In 1989 an estimated 800,000 spoke Igala, primarily in Kogi State, though current estimates place the number of Igala speakers at upwards of 1.6 million. Dialects include Ibaji, Idah, Dekina, Ogugu, Ankpa; These lgala dialects share deep lexical (vocabulary) and structural similarities with the Yoruba and Itsekiri languages, with varying degrees of influence from neighbouring languages around the Niger-Benue triangular wedge where the Igala homeland is situated. Renowned linguist Kay Williamson recorded a cognate/similarity score of 66% between Yoruba and Igala, and a score of 56% between Igala and Itsekiri.

Igala, living on the left bank of the Niger River below its junction with the Benue River. Their language belongs to the Benue–Congo branch of the Niger–Congo family. Their ruler, the Àtá, traditionally also governed two other groups, the Bassa Nge and the Bass Nkome, who live between the Igala and the Benue River.

== Historical background ==
The first ruler of the kingdom to hold the title of 'Ata' was Ebule-Jonu, a woman; she was later succeeded by her brother, Agana-Poje, who was the father of Idoko. The origins of the Igala people are traditionally linked to Abutu-Eje, a legendary ancestor believed to have founded the Igala Kingdom during the 13th or 14th century. During the 16th and 17th centuries, the Igala Kingdom flourished under the leadership of the Ata Igala, a line of influential monarchs. Dominating the region both politically and militarily, the Igala Kingdom played a central role in shaping regional dynamics, influencing nearby ethnic groups and maintaining active trade and diplomatic networks.

== Dialects ==
The Igala language consists of several dialects, and their classifications have been subject to debate. Unubi & Atadoga (2019) classify the following:

- Ankpa
- Akpanya
- Alọma/Ofabo
- Central (Dekina, Idah, Igalamela-Odolu, Ofu)
- Ibaji
- Ogwugwu (Ogugu)

In addition, Glottolog lists the following dialects, that are unclear which of Unubi & Atadoga's listing they correspond to (if any):

- Anyugba
- Ebu
- Ife

== Phonology ==
Igala's phonology is as follows:

=== Consonants ===
Consonants
		Labial	Alveolar	Palatal	Velar	Labiovelar	Labial–velar	Glottal
Nasal		m	n	ɲ ⟨ny⟩	ŋ ⟨ñ⟩	ŋʷ ⟨ñw⟩	ŋ͡m ⟨ñm⟩	
Plosive or Affricate	Voiceless	p	t	t͡ʃ ⟨ch⟩	k	(kʷ) ⟨kw⟩	k͡p ⟨kp⟩	
Plosive or Affricate	Voiced	b	d	d͡ʒ ⟨j⟩	ɡ ⟨g⟩	(ɡʷ) ⟨gw⟩	ɡ͡b ⟨gb⟩	
Fricative		f		(ʃ)				h
Trill			r					
Approximant			l	j ⟨y⟩		w		

Arokoyo (2020) states that where Yorùbá (standard dialect), Owé (a dialect of Yoruba), and Olùkùmi have /s/, Igala systematically replaces it with /tʃ/ in cognates; where they have /r/, Igala may replace with /l/; and where they have /l/, Igala may replace with /n/.

Omachonu (2001) states that the plosives /p t k/ are aspirated [pʰ tʰ kʰ] before the vowels /a o u/, while /p b m f h/ are palatalized [pʲ bʲ mʲ fʲ hʲ] before the vowel /i/.

Rodriguez (2014) and Arokoyo (2020) both do not consider the labialized velar plosives [kʷ ɡʷ] as phonemic. Arokoyo (2020) notes the voiced labialized velar plosive as replacing /w/ in certain contexts, providing examples before the vowel /a/. Rodriguez (2014) provides examples which include both the voiceless and voiced labialized velar plosives, as well as examples which include labialized alveolar plosives [tʷ dʷ] and a labialized bilabial nasal [mʷ], all occurring before the back vowels /ɔ o u/, suggesting a more complex underlying process.

Rodriguez (2014) and Arokoyo (2020) both note a phonemic palatal (postalveolar) fricative /ʃ/; however, data collected by Are & Akinola (2017) suggests instead that it is in free variation with /tʃ/.

Rodriguez (2014) treats the alveolar trill /r/ instead as an approximant /ɹ/, and states that the fricatives /s/ and /v/ are non-native but occur in loan words, providing examples for all; however, these consonants are not recognized by the other authors. Arokoyo (2020) does not recognize a palatal nasal /ɲ/.

=== Vowels ===
Vowels
	Front	Central	Back
Close	i, ĩ ⟨iṅ⟩		u, ũ ⟨uṅ⟩
Close-Mid	e		o
Open-Mid	ɛ ⟨ẹ⟩, ɛ̃ ⟨eṅ⟩		ɔ ⟨ọ⟩, ɔ̃ ⟨oṅ⟩
Open		a, ã ⟨aṅ⟩	

Igala has seven oral vowels and five nasal vowels.

=== Tones ===
Information about tone markings can be found in the orthography section below.

== Orthography ==
=== Alphabet ===
The Igala alphabet has a total of 32 letters.

Igala alphabet
Capital	Lowercase
A	a
B	b
Ch	ch
D	d
E	e
Ẹ	ẹ
F	f
G	g
Gb	gb
Gw	gw
H	h
I	i
J	j
K	k
Kp	kp
Kw	kw
L	l
M	m
N	n
Ṅ	ṅ
Ny	ny
Ñ	ñ
Ñm	ñm
Ñw	ñw
O	o
Ọ	ọ
P	p
R	r
T	t
U	u
W	w
Y	y

=== Tones ===
Igala also has five tones: extra high, high, mid-high, mid, and low.

1. The high tone is represented with an acute accent ⟨◌́⟩.
2. The mid tone is unmarked ⟨◌⟩.
3. The mid-high tone, which is an infrequent tone, is marked with a macron ⟨◌̄⟩.
4. The low tone is marked with a grave accent ⟨◌̀⟩.
5. The extra-high tone, which is usually found in negative statements, is marked with a dot ⟨◌̇⟩.

== Homographs ==
1. The word spelt, agba, depending on the tones used to pronounce it, may have four different meanings, namely:
  1. agba (casual greeting); pronounced with static, sustained Mid or Neutral tone – / ̩a ̩gba/
  2. àgbá (hand-cuffs); pronounced with Low-High tone combination / ̩à ‘gbá /
  3. àgbà (chin); pronounced with Low tone replicated – / ̩à ̩gbà /
  4. ágbá (Balsam tree); pronounced with the High tone duplicated – / á gbá / –
2. The bi-syllabic noun spelt, iga can generate three other words pronounced differently each having its distinct meaning as follows:
  1. ìga (Weaver bird); pronounced with Low-Mid tones – / ̩ ì ‘ga / – and a secondary-primary stress pattern.
  2. ìgà (net); pronounced with the Low tone duplicated – / ̩ ì ̩ gà / – and a secondary-secondary stress pattern.
  3. ìgá (estate); pronounced with the Low-High tone combination – / ̩ ì ‘gá / – and a secondary-primary stress pattern.
