= Itsekiri language =

Branch of the Yoruboid languages

Itsekiri
- Native to: Nigeria
- Ethnicity: Itsekiri people
- Native speakers: 940,000 (2020)
- Language family: Niger–Congo?: Atlantic–Congo; Volta–Niger; yeai; Yoruboid; Edekiri; Itsekiri

Language codes
- ISO 639-3: its
- Glottolog: isek1239

The Itsekiri language is a major branch of the Yoruboid group of languages, which as a group, is a key member of the Volta–Niger sub-family of the Niger–Congo family of African languages. Itsekiri is spoken by nearly 1,000,000 people in Nigeria as a first language and by many others as an additional language notably in the Niger Delta and in parts of Edo and Ondo states of Nigeria. The other key members of the Yoruboid group are Yoruba (55 million) and Igala (1.8 million) along with the various Yoruba dialects spoken in Benin and Togo.

== Classification ==
Itsekiri is most closely related to the Yoruba dialects of south western Nigeria with which it shares close similarity in grammar, lexicon and syntax. Itsekiri represents one end of a continuum of Yoruba dialects from the northern Yoruba lands of Oyo and Offa to the western reaches of the Niger-Delta. In many ways standard Yoruba and Itsekiri may be considered official variants of the same language. Although Itsekiri and the South Eastern Yoruba dialects are mutually intelligible to varying degrees depending on proximity to each other, however, unlike Yoruba dialect speakers, native Itsekiri speakers do not recognise or use the standard Yoruba language as their official lingua franca. This may be owing to the historical isolation of the main body of Itsekiri speakers (in the Niger Delta) from the continuum of Yoruba speakers and centuries of developing a separate and distinct Itsekiri socio-cultural and national identity. Nevertheless, from a linguistic standpoint, both Itsekiri and standard Yoruba (based on the Oyo dialect) can be considered to represent two official variants of what is essentially the same language - one is a Southern Yoruba dialectal fusion of Ijebu, Ondo, Owo - spoken as a national language by over a million people and the other a fusion of Oyo and Eko dialects now spoken as a standard language by over 55 million people.

Itsekiri is most closely related to Yoruba and Igala and incorporates elements of both languages. It has also been very heavily influenced by Edo (Bini), Portuguese and English and has taken in loan words from neighbouring Ijo and Urhobo languages. However its basic structure, grammar and vocabulary is essentially Yoruboid with its closest relatives being the south-eastern family of Yoruba dialects - Ijebu, Ilaje, Ikale, Ondo, and Owo. Whilst closely resembling those dialects however the Itsekiri language also features elements of Northern Yoruba notably The Ife and Oyo dialects. It is generally believed that the Itsekiri Language has developed out of an amalgam of languages spoken by various groups present in the western Niger-delta at the time of the formation of the Itsekiri nation in the 15th century. Because it has developed in the relative isolation of the Niger-Delta away from the main body of Yoruba dialects and from Igala - Itsekiri like most languages (that develop away from the main family body e.g. Icelandic) has preserved many of the original/archaic features of the original proto-Yoruba-Igala language and in particular the old Ijebu dialect of Yoruba. It is also possible that Itsekiri represents a surviving remnant of what could once have been the original Yoruba-Igala language before the split into separate languages.

Itsekiri is important to philologists and linguists today because of its role in comparative linguistics and in particular the study of the development of the Yoruba language. The Yoruba, English and Pidgin-English languages remain key modern-day influences on the development of the Itsekiri language today.

== History ==
According to Jackson Omasanjuwa Ireyefoju and Florence Ejuogharanmakelesan Ireyefoju in their work "Ife Oracle in Itsekiri Social System of Nigeria", Itsekiri people first came to Nigeria from Egypt after the battle of Actium in 31 B.C. They arrived and settled in the present day Warri Kingdom in around 28 B.C in Gborodo, Ureju and Ode Itsekiri.

Their history in Nigeria started around 15th century with a hot blooded and self-willed young man known as Prince Iginuwa (Ginuwa), the eldest son of Oba Olua- the fourteenth Oba of Bini (Benin) kingdom. The crowned prince had a lot of enemies among the chiefs due to his arrogance and his father the then Oba Olua had planned a secret voyage of no return with the eldest sons of the chiefs. Upon their arrival at the bank of River Ethiope, the crowned prince came out adorned with a regalia of kingship and named himself king (without kingdom). They settled first at Ugharegin, then moved to Efurokpe but later relaunch a new long voyage through the high waves of the Forcados River and landed in small settlement of beauty and wonder called Amatu for a while but had to move on for an ore fertile land because Amatu with all its wonders was unproductive. This time, their journey has taken them to a more fertile land inhabited by the Ijaws called Oruselemo. There, Prince Iginuwa also married an Ijoh woman named Derumo. Later, after several years, dispute arose between the migrants and the Ijaw people of Gulani (Ogulagha), as a result the prince had killed Derumo. The prince thought it is more reasonable to move, as such the ark was relaunched and they sailed through the Focados and Warri river to a virgin land that would later be called Ijala. There he gave birth to two sons; Prince Ijijen (Ijiyem) and Prince Irame. But not long after they found comfort, news of their whereabouts reached Bini and as expected, an Army was sent to bring back the running prince and his entourage. The information had reached Ijala and the mobile kingdom began preparation of relocating, hence, the movement was led by Ijijen.

Another source identified that, the history of Bini and Itsekiri Ginuwa, began with a prince of Benin founded the Iwere (Warri) Kingdom about 1480. At the beginning of the 17th century, a son of the reigning Olu was sent to Portugal and returned with a Portuguese wife after Warri was visited by the Portuguese in the 15th century. Their son Antonio Domingo was Olu of Warri in the 1640s. Olu Erejuwa, who reigned from about 1720 to 1800, expanded Warri politically and commercially, using the Portuguese to further Warri's independence of Benin and to establish control over a wider area.

== Greeting culture ==
The greeting culture in Itsekiri is characterised by absolute politeness. Common greetings in Itsekiri include- Good morning = Ere ọwurọ, Good afternoon = Ere ọsọn, Good evening = Ere Alẹ, Good night (to sleep) = Odejuma. Other forms of greetings include - How are you? = Bokọ, Fine= Mo winọrọn, Thank you= Mo dọkpẹ.
