= Ulukwumi language =

Yoruboid language of Nigeria

Ulukwumi
- Olùkùmi
- Native to: Nigeria
- Region: Aniocha North LGA, Delta State
- Native speakers: (10,000 cited 1992)
- Language family: Niger–Congo?: Atlantic–Congo; Volta–Niger; yeai; Yoruboid; Edekiri; Ulukwumi

Language codes
- ISO 639-3: ulb
- Glottolog: uluk1257

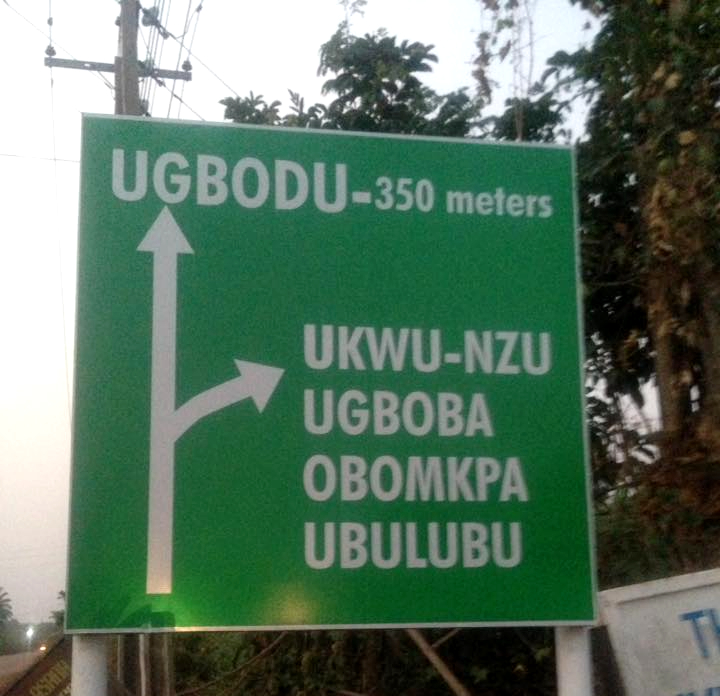
Road signage indicating some Olukumi villages of northern Delta state, close to the Edo state border.

Ulukwumi, also known as Olùkùmi, is a Yoruboid language spoken by the Olukumi people of Aniocha North LGA, Delta State, Nigeria.

Olùkùmi means 'my friend' in the Owé dialect of Yoruba and Igala.

== Vocabulary ==
Below are some Olùkùmi words compared with the other Yoruboid languages Yorùbá (standard dialect), Òwé (a Yoruba dialect spoken in Kabba district of Kabba-Bunu LGA, Kogi State), and Igala, as given by Arokoyo (2012):

Gloss	Olùkùmi	Yorùbá	Òwé	Igala
hand	ọwọ́	ọwọ́	ọwọ́	ọ́wọ́
yam	uṣu	iṣu/uṣu	uṣu/iṣu	úchu
body	ara	ara/ọra	ọra	ọ́la
child	ọma	ọmọ	ọmọ	ọ́ma
friend	oluku	olùkù	olúku	ónùkú
woman	obìnrin	obìnrin	obùnrin	ọ́bùlẹ
father	ba	bàbá	baba	àtá
person	ẹnẹ	ẹni	ọni	ọ́nẹ̀
fire	uná	iná	uná	úná
word	ọ̀fọ̀	ọ̀rọ̀	ọ̀rọ̀	ọ̀là
heart	ẹdọ	ọkàn	ẹ̀kẹ̀dọ̀	ẹ̀dọ̀
pot	ùṣà	ìṣà	ùṣà	ùchà
cow/meat	ẹla	malu/ẹran	ẹlá	ẹ́la
old person	arigbo	arúgbo	arígbó	ògìjo
rat	eku	eku	eku	íkélékwu
carry	gbe	gbé	gbe	né
eat	zẹ	jẹ	jẹ	jẹ
colanut	obì	obì	obì	obì
water	omi	omi	omi	ómi
urine	ìtọ̀	ìtọ̀	ìtọ̀	ìtọ̀
cotton	òwú	òwú	òwú	òwú
stone	òkúta	òkúta	òkúta	òkwúta

== Sources ==
- Arokoyo et al. 2022. Olùkùmi Living Dictionary. Living Tongues Institute for Endangered Languages. https://livingdictionaries.app/olukumi/entries/list
- Eleshin, Alimot Folake. 2012. A comparative study of the morphosyntax of Olukumi and Standard Yorùbá: a minimalist approach. MA thesis, University of Ilorin.
- Okolo-Obi, Bosco. 2014. Aspects of Olukumi Phonology. MA thesis, Nsukka: University of Nigeria; 117pp.
- Obisesan, H. 2012. Lexical Comparison Of Olukumi, Owo Dialect And Standard Yoruba. Seminar paper presented to the Department of Linguistics and Nigerian Languages, University of Ilorin, Ilorin.
