= Onicha-Ugbo =

Onuchu-Ugbo is a town in Aniocha North Local Government Area, Delta State, Nigeria. The town's traditional ruler is the Obi of Onuchu-Ugbo; as of 2002, the obi is Agbogidi Chukwumalieze.

== Religion ==
Christianity is the primary religion of the Onuchu-Ugbo Community.

== Notable people ==
- Emmanuel Ibe Kachikwu, current group managing director of the Nigerian National Petroleum Corporation and immediate past vice-chairman and general counsel for ExxonMobil in Africa.
- Jude Monye, competed in Atlanta 1996 and won a silver medal at Sydney 2000.
