= Ubulu Ukwu =

Nigerian rural town

Ubulu-Uku (also known as Ubulu-Uku) is an Enuani town situated in Aniocha South Local Government Area of Delta State. It shares boundaries with Ogwuashi-Uku to the east, Obior to the west, Isselu-Uku to the north, and Ubulu-Unor to the south. Ubulu-Uku is ruled by HRH Eze Chukwuka Noah Akaeze 1 since 2016. The main occupation of the town is farming with its major produce as cassava, maize, yam, palm produce, cashew, timber, cocoyam, cotton and poultery. The men are expert hunters and palm wine tappers while the women are renowned for their cloth weaving.

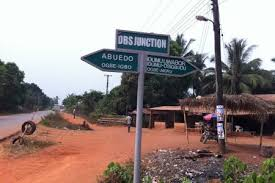

== History ==
According to oral history, Ezemu founded ubulu-uku town when he left his parents at Afor town in present-day Ndokwa and moved southwards in search of a new settlement. When Ezemu arrived at the foot of the ubulu tree (from where the town gets its name) he settled there. Ezemu is said to have had a son and a daughter. A detailed account on the history of ubulu-uku can be seen in the book The History of Ubulu-Uku authored by Mr. Joseph Obi Anene.

== Geography ==
Ubulu-Uku is located in Aniocha South local government area of Delta State. It shares boundaries with Ogwuashi-Uku to the east, Obior to the west, Isele-Uku to the north, and Ubulu-unor to the south. The total area of the town is 11.4 square miles (29.5 km²). the population of the town is estimated at 12000 people.

== Economy ==
Ubulu-Uku is a great agricultural town and has historically been known for its Yam, Cassava, Livestocks, Palm-Wine and Weaved Clothes. Their markets are conducted on every 4^{th} day called Eke Market. Ubulu-Uku have always had strong economic ties with the Benin Kingdom and Onitsha.
