= Aniocha North =

- LGA
- Interactive map of Aniocha North
- Location within Nigeria
- Coordinates: 6°21′N 6°29′E
- Country: Nigeria
- State: Delta State
- Headquarters: Issele-Uku

Area
  - Land: 406 km^{2} (157 sq mi)
- Elevation: 259 m (850 ft)

Population (2006)
  - Total: 104,062
  - Density: 256/km^{2} (664/sq mi)
- Time zone: UTC+1 (WAT)
- Postal code: 320
- National language: Igbo

Aniocha North is a Local Government Area of Delta State, Nigeria, with its headquarters in Issele-Uku. It comprises the subgroup of Anioma and towns. The National Youth Service Corps (NYSC) permanent orientation camp for Delta state is located at Issele Ukwu town.Aniocha North Local Government was carved out of the defunct Aniocha Local Government of the equally defunct Bendel State on August 27, 1991 by the Military Government of General Ibrahim Badamosi Babangida (RTD).

It has a land area of 406.00 km^{2} (40,600 hectares or 156.76 sq mi), with an alititude of 259 m (850 ft) above mean-sea level. Aniocha North Local Government Area experiences the Tropical savanna climate based on the Köppen's climate classification (Aw) and has a population of 104,062 according to the 2006 census.

The postal code of the area is 320.

== Cities, Towns and Communities ==
- Abudalo Camp
- Aniofu
- Ezi
- Idumuje-Ugboko
- Idumuje-Unor
- Idumuogo
- Ikem Camp
- Isa-Ogwashi
- Issele-Azagba
- Issele Uku, LGA headquarters
- Issele-Mkpitime
- Obior
- Obomkpa
- Ogbeanei Camp
- Okofia Camp
- Onicha Olona
- Onicha-Ugbo
- Onicha-Uku (formerly Onicha-Ukwu)
- Ubulubu
- Ugboba
- Ugbodu
- Ugodo
- Ukwu-Nzu (also known as Eko-Efun)
