= Yoruboid languages =

Branch of the YEAI Languages

Yoruboid
- Geographic distribution: Eastern Ghana, Central Togo, Southern, Central & Northern Benin, Western, Southern and Central Nigeria
- Linguistic classification: Niger–Congo?: Atlantic–Congo; Volta–Niger; YEAI; Yoruboid
- Early form: Undifferentiated Ede-Igala
- Proto-language: Proto-Yoruboid language
- Subdivisions: Igala; Edekiri

Language codes
- Glottolog: yoru1244

Yoruboid is a language family composed of the Igala group of dialects spoken in south central Nigeria, and the Edekiri languages subdivided into the Ede group (which includes Yoruba) spoken in a band across Togo, Ghana, Benin and southern Nigeria, and the Itsekiri group of the Warri Kingdom in the northwestern Niger-Delta.

== Name ==
The name Yoruboid derived from its most widely spoken member, Yoruba, which has around 55 million primary and secondary speakers. Another well-known Yoruboid language is Itsekiri (about 1,000,000 speakers). The Yoruboid group is a branch of Defoid, which also includes the Akoko and Ayere-Ahan languages.

The term Defoid itself is a derivative combination using the elements ede (meaning 'language' in most lects within the grouping), "Ifẹ", a city of profound cultural significance to speakers of the diverse lects, and -oid, a suffix meaning 'to be like' or 'in the same manner as'. The Defoid group itself is a branch of the Benue–Congo subfamily of the wider Niger–Congo family of languages.

All Yoruboid languages are tonal, with most of them having three level tones. Grammatically, they are isolating with a subject–verb–object basic word order and share significant degrees of both structural and lexical similarities.

== Languages ==
Igala is a key Yoruboid language, spoken by 1.6 million people in the Niger-Benue confluence of central Nigeria; it is excised from the main body of Yoruboid languages to the west by Ebira and the northern Edoid languages. Igala is closely related to both Yoruba and Itsekiri languages.

The Itsekiris are a riverine Yoruboid-speaking people indigenous to the Niger Delta region of Nigeria. They maintain a distinct identity separate from other Yoruboid-speaking peoples but speak a very closely related language. Their neighbouring languages are the Urhobo, the Okpe, the Edo, the Ijo, and the Mahin / Ugbo, Yoruba dialects spoken in neighbouring Ondo State.

== Subdivisions ==
Proto-Yoruboid
Igala	Edekiri
Ede (Yoruba Proper)*	Itsekiri**
Western Ede	Mokole	Eastern Ede
North Nago & Ede Kura	Southwestern Ede	Ede Shabe	Southeastern Ede
Ede Isha & Manigri	Ede Idaasha	Ana-Ife	Nuclear Yoruba	Ede Ije, South Nago
Ede Yoruba - Lucumi	Olukumi/Ulukwumi***
NWY & SWY	Central Yoruba	NEY & SEY

* - All dialects in the Ede cluster share between 85 and 95% lexical similarity and are thus all mutually intelligible without needing different specialized literature to achieve universal understanding.
** - Itsekiri is actually most closely related to SEY (South-Eastern Yoruba), and is a divergent branch thereof, but has a different standard writing orthography.
*** - Some scholars classify Olukumi as a separate variant of Nuclear Yoruba, and others as a dialect of SEY.

== Names and locations ==
Below is a list of selected Yoruboid language names, populations, and locations from Blench (2019).

Language	Dialects	Alternate spellings	Own name for language	Endonym(s)	Other names (location-based)	Other names for language	Exonym(s)	Speakers	Location(s)
Ulukwumi		Olukumi, Unukwumi						20,000	Delta State, Aniocha and Oshimili LGAs
Igala	Ánkpa and Ògùgù in Ankpa LGA; Ìfè in Ankpa and Dekina LGAs; Ànyìgbá in Dekina LGA; ‘Idáh and Ìbàjì in Idah and Anambra(?) LGAs; and Èbú in Oshimili LGA						Igara	295,000 (1952), 800,000 (1987 UBS)	Benue State, Ankpa, Dekina, Idah and Bassa LGAs; Edo State, Oshimili LGA; Anambra State, Anambra LGA
Iṣẹkiri		Itsekiri, Ishekiri, Shekiri, Chekiri, Jekri, Izekíri, Tshekeri, Dsekiri				Iwere, Irhobo, Warri	Iselema–Otu (Ịjọ name for Warri/Itsekiri people), Selemo	33,000 (1952); over 100,000 (1963 Omamor); 500,000 (1987 UBS)	Delta State, Warri, Bomadi and Ethiope LGAs
Yoruba	Many dialects		Yorùbá	Yorùbá	Aku, Akusa, Eyagi, Nago			5,100,000 (1952), 15,000,000 (UBS 1984), 50,000,000 (Ethnologue 2018)	Most of Kwara, Lagos, Osun, Oyo, Ogun, Ekiti and Ondo States; western LGAs in Kogi State; and into Benin Republic, Togo and Ghana. Yoruba is spoken as a ritual language in Cuba and Brazil

== See also ==
- Proto-Yoruboid language
- List of Proto-Yoruboid reconstructions (Wiktionary)
