= List of hospitals in Greece =

This is a list of hospitals in Greece. The list contains links to notable hospitals in Greece. As of 2005, there were 327 hospitals in Greece, including public and private hospitals. The number of hospitals declined to 283 by 2017. At the moment there are about 200 hospitals.

== Hospitals ==
The active Greek hospitals are listed in this table, along with their location, the year they opened and references. The Greek word agios (saint) is commonly used in names of hospitals. The oldest active hospital is the Elpis Hospital in Athens, founded in 1842. The oldest hospital is the Syros General Hospital in Ermoupoli, Syros, founded 1827 during the Greek revolution.

19 hospitals that were founded in the 19th century. 7 hospitals in Athens, 2 hospitals in Thessaloniki (1 closed in 2013) and Patras (1 closed in 1871) and 1 hospital in Syros, Ioannina, Volos, Missolonghi, Tripoli, Rethymno, Lesbos, Samos and Chios.

=== Attica ===
Name (other name)	Location	Established
251 Hellenic Air Force General Hospital	Athens	1945
401 Hellenic Army General Military Hospital of Athens	Athens	1904
414 Hellenic Army General Military Hospital Special Diseases	Penteli, Attica	1952
417 NIMTS (Army Equity Fund Hospital)	Athens	1946,
Agia Eleni-Spiliopouleio Hospital	Athens	1916
Agioi Anargyroi Hospital	Kifissia, Athens	1969
Agios Savvas Anti-Cancer Hospital	Athens	1935
Aiginiteio Hospital	Athens	1904
Alexandra General Hospital	Athens	1954
Amalia Fleming General Hospital (Note: Amalia Fleming General Hospital was named after Amalia Fleming, a notable physician.)	Melissia, Athens	1986
Andreas Sygros Venereal and Dermatological Hospital	Athens	1910
Aretaio Hospital	Athens	1898
Asclepeion Hospital of Voula	Voula, Athens	1921
Attikon General Hospital	Chaidari, Athens	2002
Agios Panteleimonas General Hospital	Nikaia, Piraeus	1952
Aiginition Hospital	Athens	1909
Athens Day Care Center "Nikos Kourkoulos"	Athens	2017
Athens General State Hospital "Georgios Gennimatas"	Athens	1958
Athens Eye Hospital	Athens	1854
Agia Sofia Children's Hospital	Athens	1901
Daphni Psychiatric Hospital (Note: The Daphni Psychiatric Hospital is the largest hospital in Greece.)	Chaidari, Athens	1925
Dromokaiteio Psychiatric Hospital	Chaidari, Athens	1887
Elena Gynecological Hospital	Athens	1933
Elpis Hospital	Athens	1842
Evangelismos Hospital (Note: Evangelismo Hospital is the largest public general hospital in Greece)	Kolonaki, Athens	1884
Evgenidion Hospital	Athens	1975
Henry Dunant Hospital	Athens	2000
Hera Maternity Hospital (Private)	Cholargos, Athens	1978
Hygeia Hospital (Diagnostic and Therapeutic Center of Athens) (Note: The Hygeia Hospital was the first private hospital in Greece.)	Athens	1970
Iaso Maternity Hospital (Private)	Marousi, Athens	1996
Ippokrateion Hospital	Athens	1908
KAT Hospital	Kifissia, Athens	1963
Konstantopouleio Hospital "Agia Olga"	Nea Ionia, Athens	1923
Kythira General Hospital - Health Center "Triphyllio"	Kythira, Attica	1953
Laiko General Hospital (Note: Peoples General Hospital was previously known as Laiko General Hospital)	Athens	1963
Lyto Maternity Hospital (Private)	Athens	1970
Medical Center (Private)	Marousi, Athens	1984
Metaxa Anti-Cancer Hospital	Piraeus, Attica	1967
Metropolitan Hospital (Private)	Piraeus, Attica	2001
Mother Maternity Hospital (Private)	Marousi, Athens	1979
National Rehabilitation Center	Kamatero, Athens	1945
Naval Hospital of Athens	Athens	1869
Naval Hospital of Piraeus	Piraeus, Attica	1924
Onassio Cardiac Surgery Centre	Kallithea, Athens	1992
Pammakaristos General Hospital	Athens	1953
Panagiotis & Aglaia Kyriakou Children's Hospital	Athens	1938
Patisia Health Center	Athens	2018
Penteli Children's Hospital	Penteli, Attica	1981
Rhea Maternity Hospital (Private)	Palaio Faliro, Athens	2007
Sismanogleio General Hospital	Vrilissia, Athens	1936
Sotiria Thoracic Diseases Hospital	Athens	1902
Thriasseio Western Athens General Hospital	Magoula, Attica	1995
Tzanio Hospital	Piraeus, Attica	1873

==== Former hospitals ====
Name (other name)	Location	Operating period
Korgialeneio Benakeio Hellenic Red Cross Hospital	Athens	1930-1994
First IKA Hospital, Formerly "Papadimitriou"	Melissia, Athens	1936-2011
Polykliniki General Hospital	Athens	1903-2013
Patisia General Hospital	Ano Patisia, Athens	1968-2013
General Hospital of Western Attica "Agia Varvara"	Agia Varvara, Athens	1903-2013
Nursing Merchant Marine Foundation	Melissia, Athens	1948-1982

=== Thessaloniki ===
Name (other name)	Location	Established/New building
424 Hellenic Army General Military Training Hospital	Thessaloniki	1912
Agios Loukas Hospital (Private) (Note: St. Luke's Hospital is a private hospital managed by Greek Med Top Partners)	Panorama, Thessaloniki	1975
AHEPA University Hospital	Thessaloniki	1947
Interbalkan Medical Center (Private)	Thessaloniki	2000
Ippokrateion General Hospital	Thessaloniki	1908 (1983)
Papageorgiou General Hospital	Efkarpia, Thessaloniki	1999
Papanikolaou General Hospital	Exochi, Thessaloniki	1920
Thessaloniki Anti-Cancer Hospital "Theageneio"	Thessaloniki	1895
Thessaloniki General Hospital "Agios Dimitrios"	Thessaloniki	1901
Thessaloniki General Hospital "Agios Pavlos"	Kalamaria, Thessaloniki	1987
Thessaloniki General Hospital "Georgios Gennimatas"	Thessaloniki	1916
Thessaloniki Psychiatric Hospital	Stavroupoli, Thessaloniki	1917
Thessaloniki Venereal and Skin Diseases Hospital	Thessaloniki	1917

==== Former hospitals ====
Name (other name)	Location	Operating period
Second IKA Hospital "Panagia"	Kalamaria, Thessaloniki	1952-2013
Thessaloniki Special Diseases Hospital	Thessaloniki	1894-2013

=== Central Greece ===
Name (other name)	Location	Established
Amfissa General Hospital	Amfissa	1953
Chalcis General Hospital	Chalcis, Euboea	2020
Karpenisi General Hospital	Karpenisi	1956
Karystos General Hospital - Health Center	Karystos, Euboea	1949
Kymi General Hospital - Health Center	Kymi, Euboea	1980
Lamia General Hospital	Lamia	1946
Livadeia General Hospital	Livadeia	1967
Thebes General Hospital	Thebes	1951

=== Central Macedonia ===
Name (other name)	Location	Established
Chalkidiki General Hospital	Polygyros	
Edessa General Hospital	Edessa	1925
Giannitsa General Hospital	Giannitsa	1908
Goumenissa General Hospital	Goumenissa	1936
Katerini General Hospital	Katerini	1944
Kilkis General Hospital	Kilkis	1928
Naousa General Hospital	Naousa	1940
Serres General Hospital	Serres	1949
Veria General Hospital	Veria	1924

=== Western Macedonia ===
Name (other name)	Location	Established
Florina General Hospital "Eleni Dimitriou"	Florina	1934
Grevena General Hospital	Grevena	1945
Kastoria General Hospital	Kastoria	1936
Kozani General Hospital "Mamatseio"	Kozani	1923
Ptolemaida General Hospital "Mpodosakeio"	Ptolemaida	1984

=== Eastern Macedonia and Thrace ===
Name (other name)	Location	Established/New building
212 Mobile Surgical Hospital of Xanthi	Xanthi	1987
216 Mobile Surgical Hospital of Alexandroupoli	Alexandroupoli	1953
Alexandroupoli University Hospital	Alexandroupoli	1939 (2002)
Didymoteicho General Hospital	Didymoteicho	1946 (1995)
Drama General Hospital	Drama	1959
Kavala General Hospital	Kavala	1900 (2010)
Komotini Hospital "Sismanogleio"	Komotini	1937
Xanthi General Hospital	Xanthi	1929

=== Epirus ===
Name (other name)	Location	Established/New building
Arta General Hospital	Arta	1945
Filiates General Hospital	Filiates, Thesprotia	1947 (1991)
Ioannina General Hospital "G. Chatzikostas"	Ioannina	1845 (1987)
Ioannina University General Hospital	Ioannina	1986
Preveza General Hospital	Preveza	1972

=== Thessaly ===
Name (other name)	Location	Established/New building
404 Hellenic Army General Military Hospital of Larissa	Larissa	1936
Karditsa General Hospital	Karditsa	1935 (1985)
Larissa General Hospital "Koutlimpaneio-Triantafyleio"	Larissa	1895
Larissa University General Hospital	Larissa	1999
Trikala General Hospital	Trikala	1950
Volos General Hospital "Achilopouleio"	Volos	1885

=== Western Greece ===
Name (other name)	Location	Established/New building
Aetolia-Acarnania General Hospital - Nursing unit of Agrinio	Agrinio	1933
Aetolia-Acarnania General Hospital - Nursing unit of Missolonghi	Missolonghi	1852
Aigio General Hospital	Aigio	1958
Amaliada General Hospital	Amaliada	1949
Patras General Hospital "Agios Andreas"	Patras	1871 (1973 & 2017)
Kalavryta General Hospital - Health Center	Kalavryta	1943
Kato Achaia Health Center	Kato Achaia	1973
Kyanous Stavros of Patras (Private)	Patras	2002
Patras General Children's Hospital "Karamandaneio"	Patras	1937
Patras Maternity Clinic (Private)	Patras	1978
Patras Olympion Therapeftirion (Private)	Patras	2004
Pyrgos General Hospital "Andreas Papandreou"	Pyrgos	2004
Rigopoulos General Clinic "Protoklitos" (Private)	Patras	1925
Trigas Nephros Chronic Hemodialysis Unit (Private)	Patras	2021
University General Hospital of Patras "Panagia i Voitheia"	Rio, Patras	1988

==== Former hospitals ====
Name (other name)	Location	Operating period
Evaggelismos Clinic (Private)	Patras	1976-2002
Ιο Maternity Clinic (Private)	Patras	1933-2018
Old Municipal Hospital of Patras	Patras	1857-1871
Solomos Orthopedic Clinic (Private)	Patras	1970-2014

=== Peloponnese ===
Name (other name)	Location	Established
411 Hellenic Army General Military Hospital of Tripoli	Tripoli	1912
Argolida General Hospital - Nursing unit of Argos	Argos	1973
Argolida General Hospital - Nursing unit of Nafplio	Nafplio	1941
Corinth General Hospital	Corinth	1965
Laconia General Hospital	Sparta	1953
Messenia General Hospital - Nursing unit of Kalamata	Kalamata	2000
Messenia General Hospital - Nursing unit of Kyparissia	Kyparissia	1947
Tripoli Panarcadic General Hospital "I Evagelistria"	Tripoli	1896

=== Crete ===
Name (other name)	Location	Established
Agios Nikolaos General Hospital	Agios Nikolaos	1940
Chania General Hospital "Agios Georgios"	Chania	1905
Crete Navy Hospital	Chania	1969
Heraklion General Hospital "Venizeleio-Pananeio"	Heraklion	1953
Ierapetra General Hospital	Ierapetra	1955
Neapoli General Hospital "Dialynakeio"	Neapoli	1944
Rethymno General Hospital	Rethymno	1899
Sitia General Hospital	Sitia	1947
University General Hospital of Heraklion	Heraklion	1989

=== North Aegean ===
Name (other name)	Location	Established/New building
Chios General Hospital "Skylitsio"	Chios	1886 (1983)
Ikaria General Hospital - Health Center "Panikarion"	Agios Kirykos	1958 (1987)
Lemnos General Hospital - Health Center	Myrina	1937 (1987)
Lesbos General Hospital "Vostaneio"	Mytilene	1858 (1935 & 1953)
Samos General Hospital "Agios Panteleimon"	Vathy	1877 (1948)

=== South Aegean ===
Name (other name)	Location	Established/New building
Syros General Hospital "Vardakeio & Proio"	Ermoupoli	1827 (1958)
Kalymnos General Hospital - Health Center "Bouvaleio"	Pothia	1926 (1971)
Karpathos General Hospital "Agios Ioannis o Karpathios"	Karpathos	1958 (2017)
Kos General Hospital - Health Center "Ippokrateion"	Kos	1930 (1987)
Leros State Hospital - General Hospital - Health Center	Lakki	1957 (1993)
Naxos General Hospital - Health Center	Naxos	1987 (2001)
Rhodes General Hospital "Andreas Papandreou"	Rhodes	1938 (2001)
Thira General Hospital	Santorini	2016

=== Ionian Islands ===
Name (other name)	Location	Established/New building
Corfu General Hospital "Agia Eirini"	Corfu	1726 (1953)
Kefalonia General Hospital "Agios Gerasimos"	Argostoli	1989
Lefkada General Hospital	Lefkada	1953
Lixouri General Hospital "Mantzavinateio"	Lixouri	1957
Zakynthos General Hospital "Agios Dionysios"	Zakynthos	1966

== Gallery ==
Selected Greek hospitals
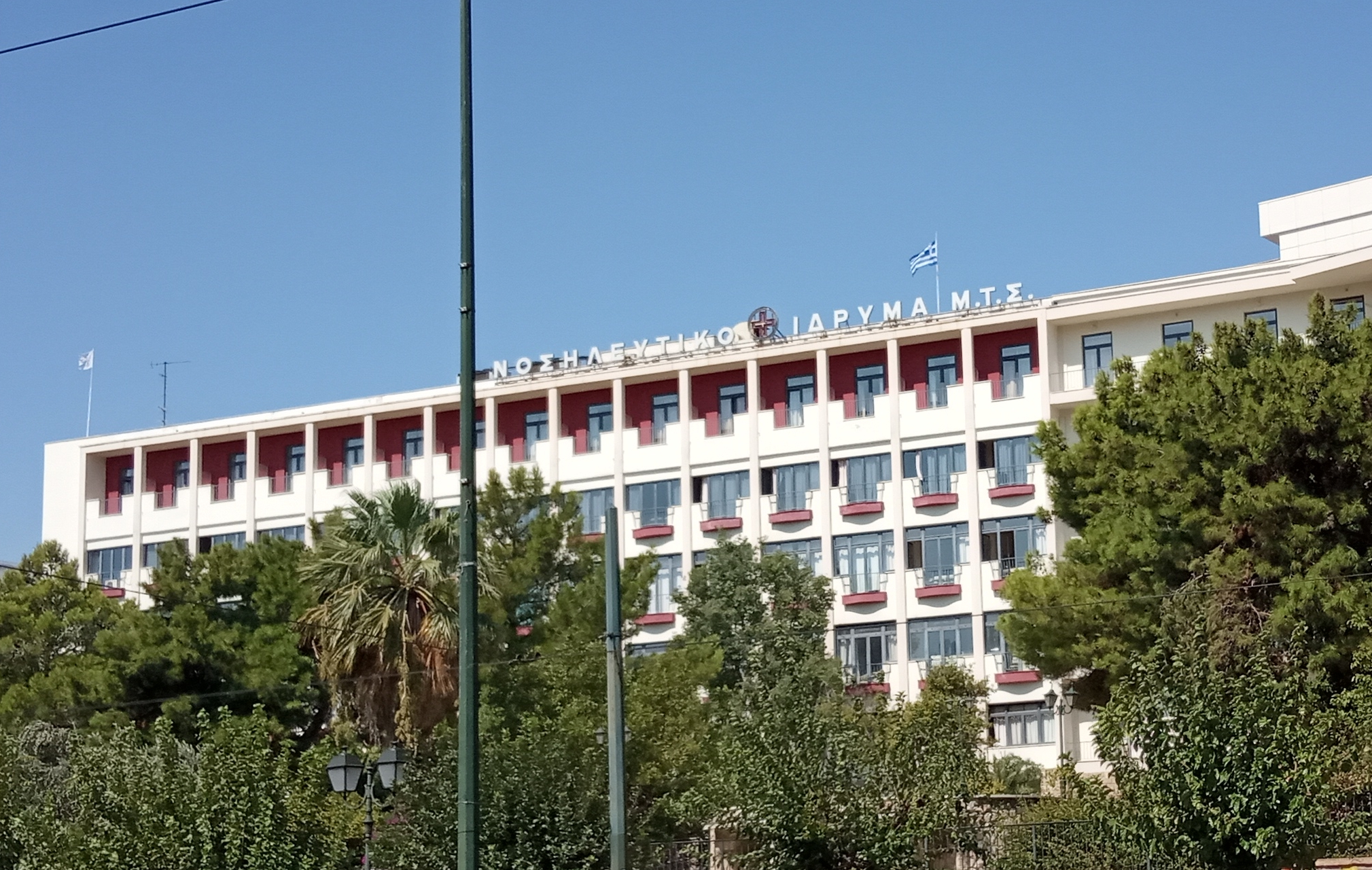
417 NIMTS Army Equity Fund Hospital, Athens

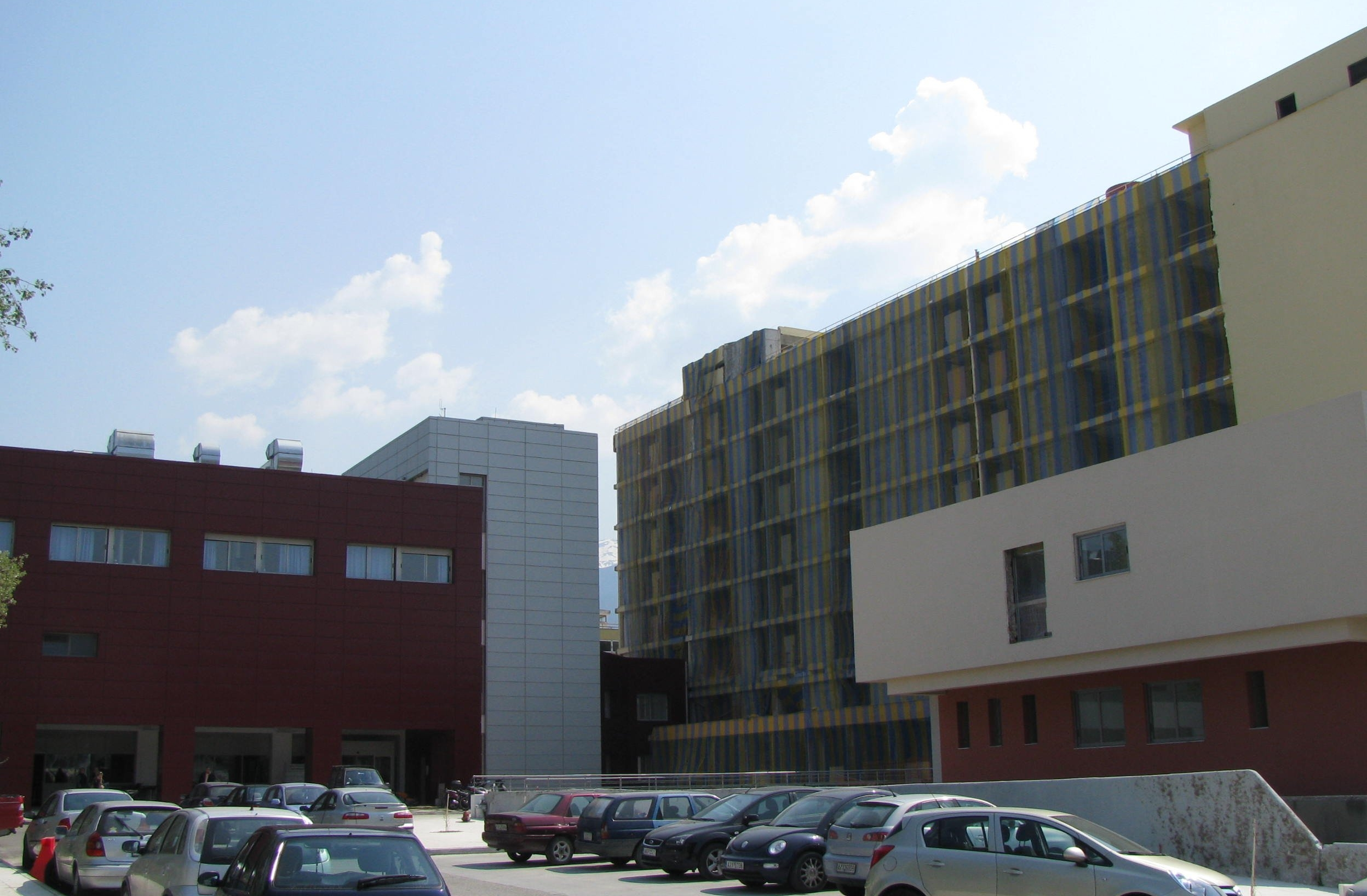
Patras General Hospital "Agios Andreas", Patras

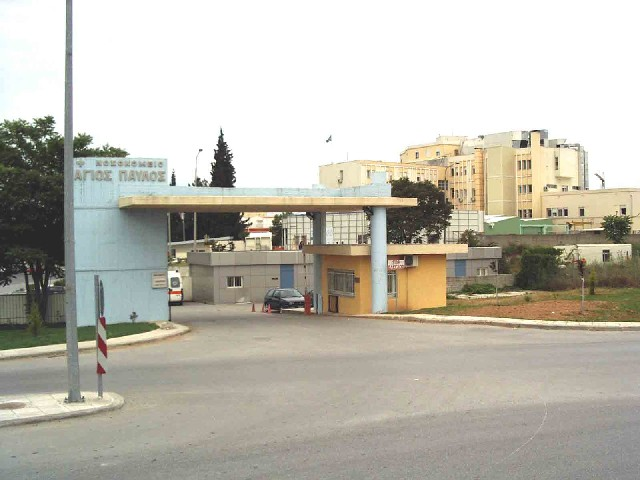
Agios Pavlos General Hospital, Thessaloniki

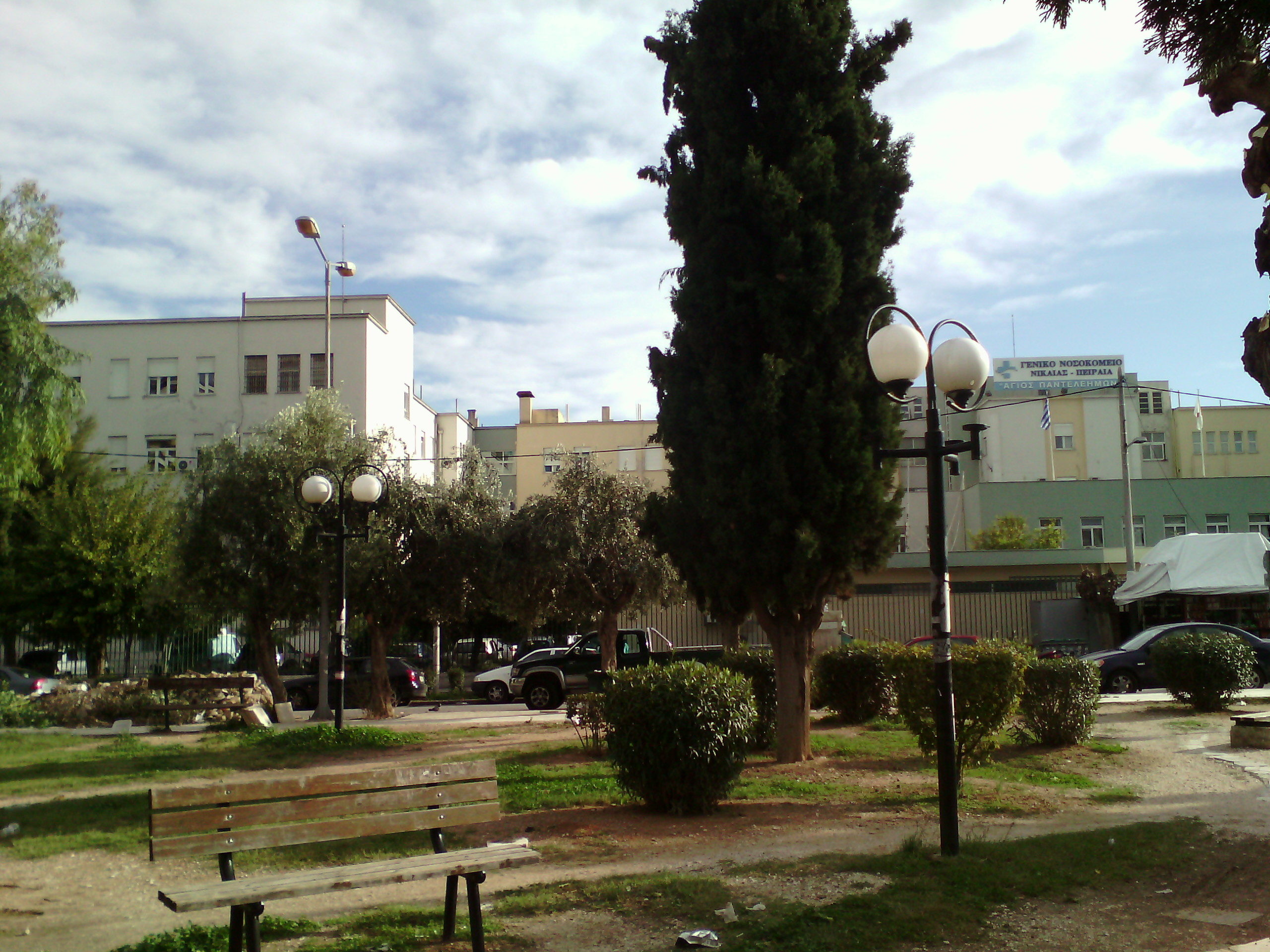
Agios Panteleimonas Hospital, Athens

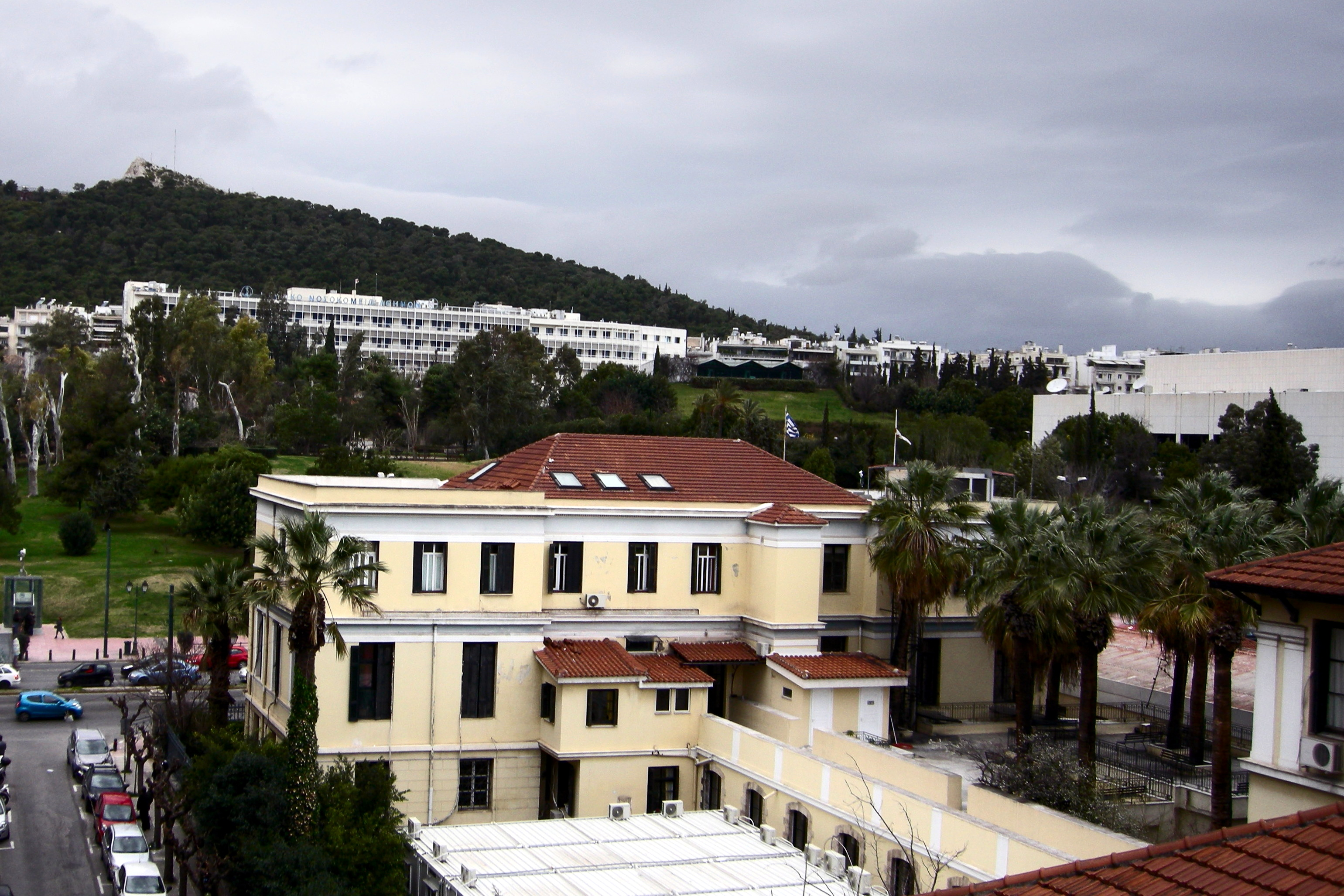
Aiginiteio Hospital, Athens

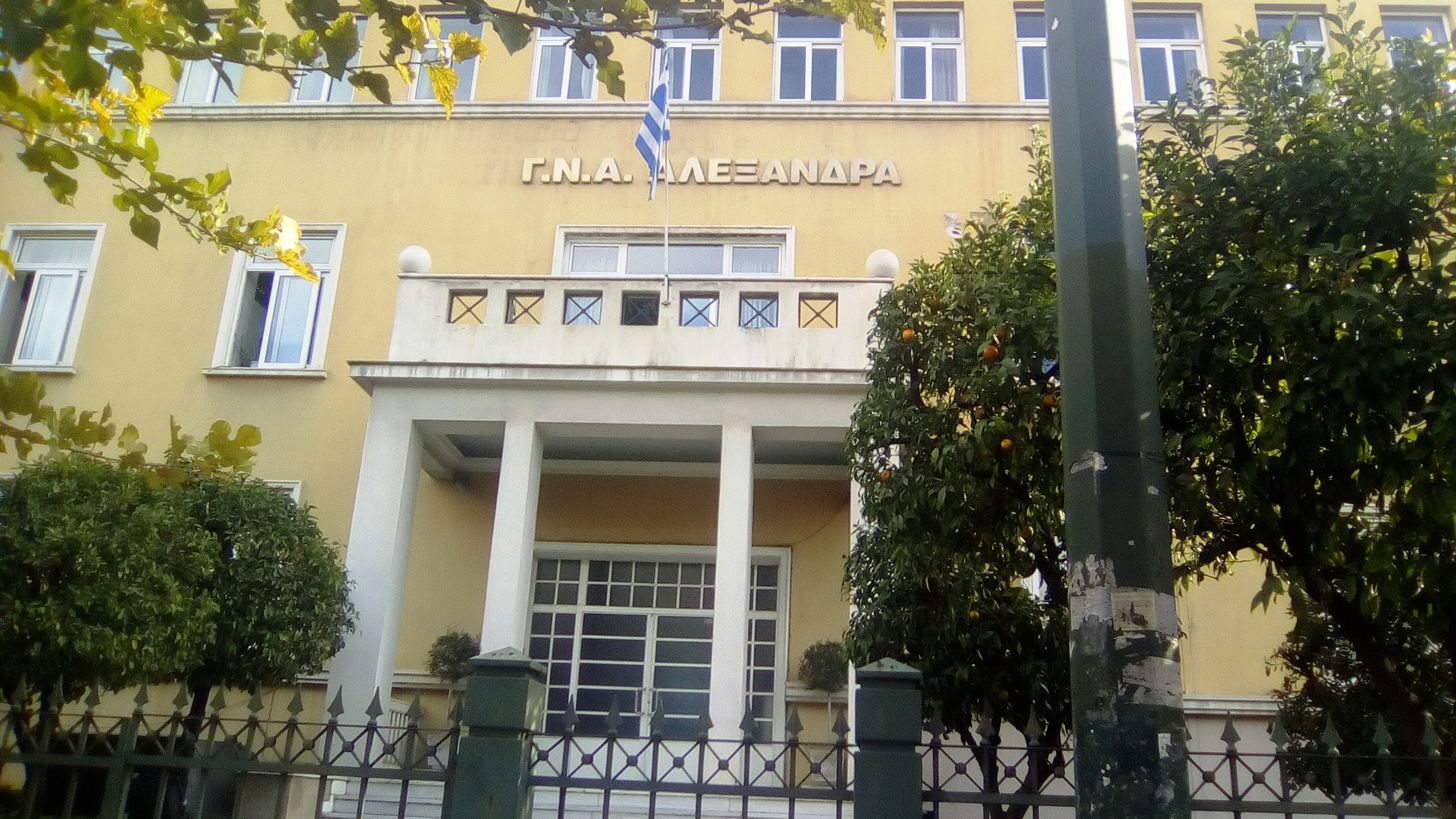
Alexandra General Hospital, Athens

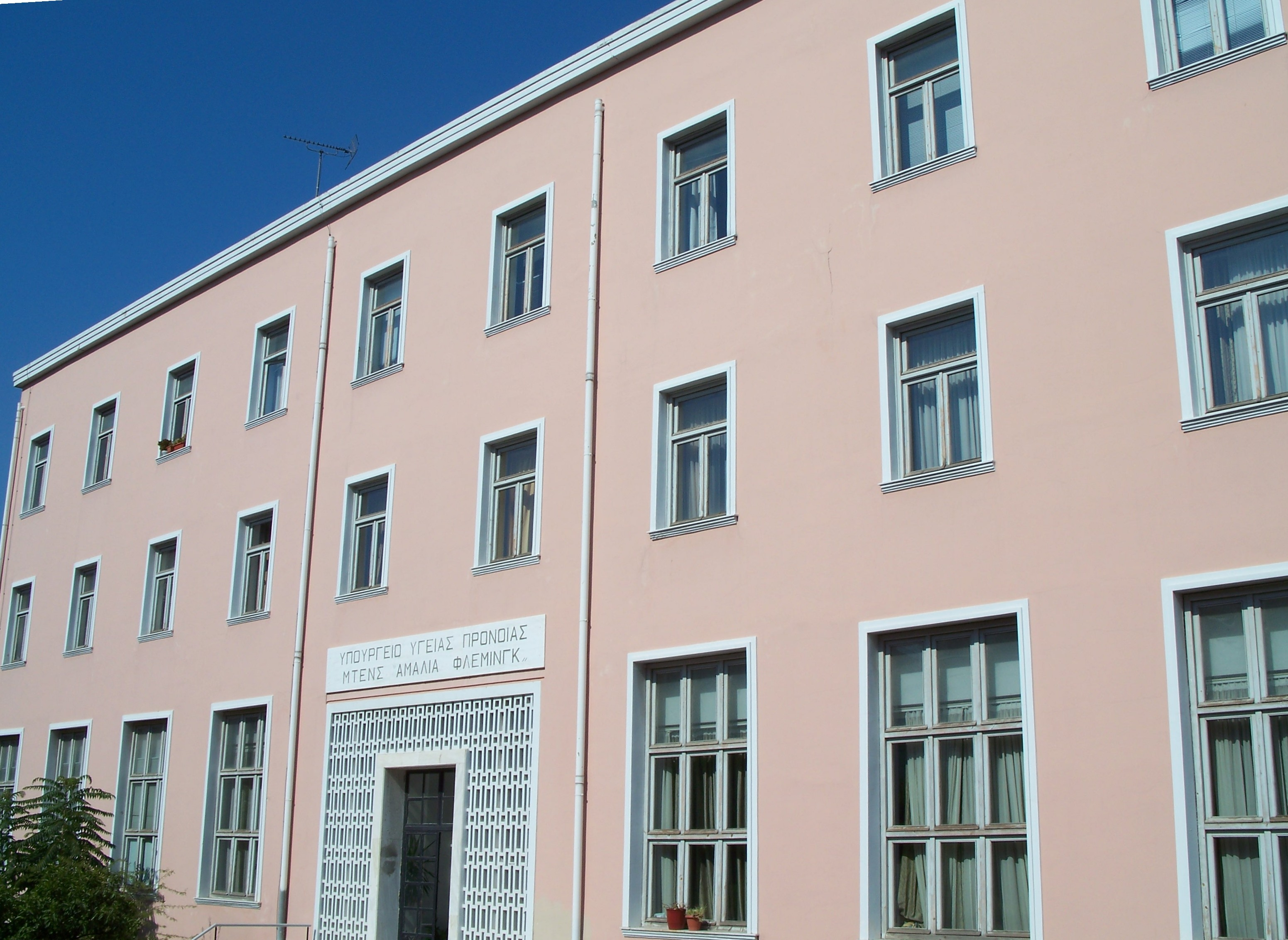
Amalia Fleming Hospital, Athens

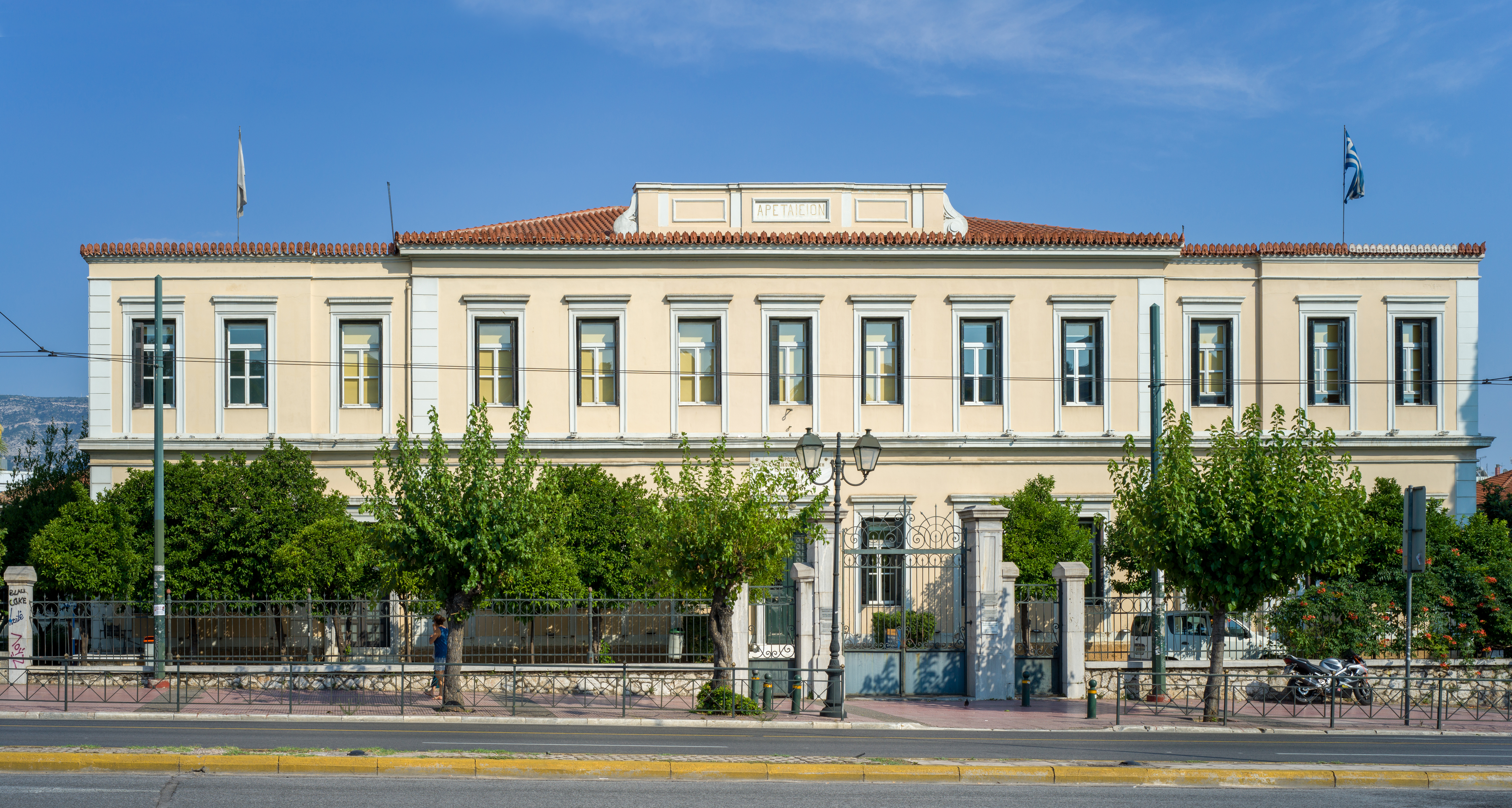
Aretaio Hospital, Athens

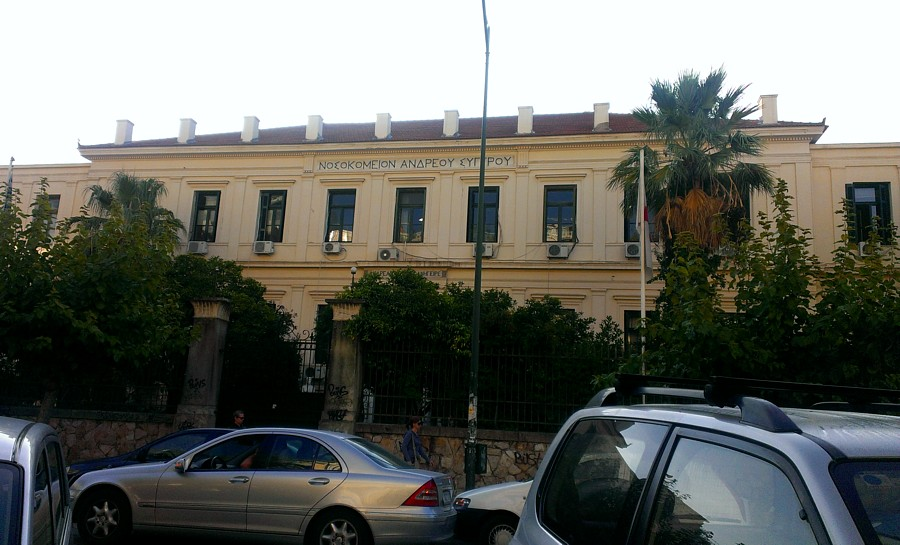
Andreas Syggros Venereal and Dermatological Hospital, Athens

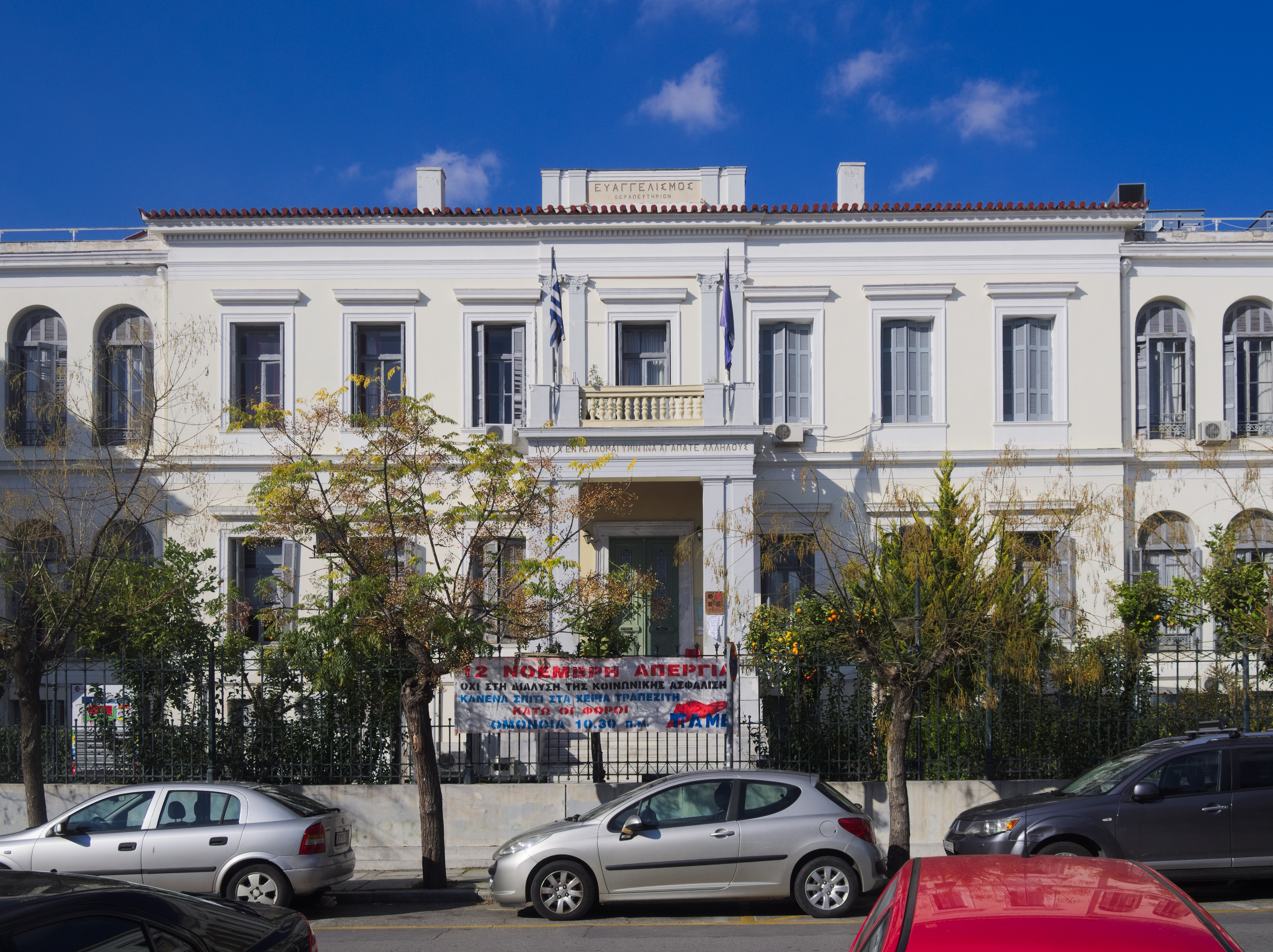
Evangelismos Hospital, Athens

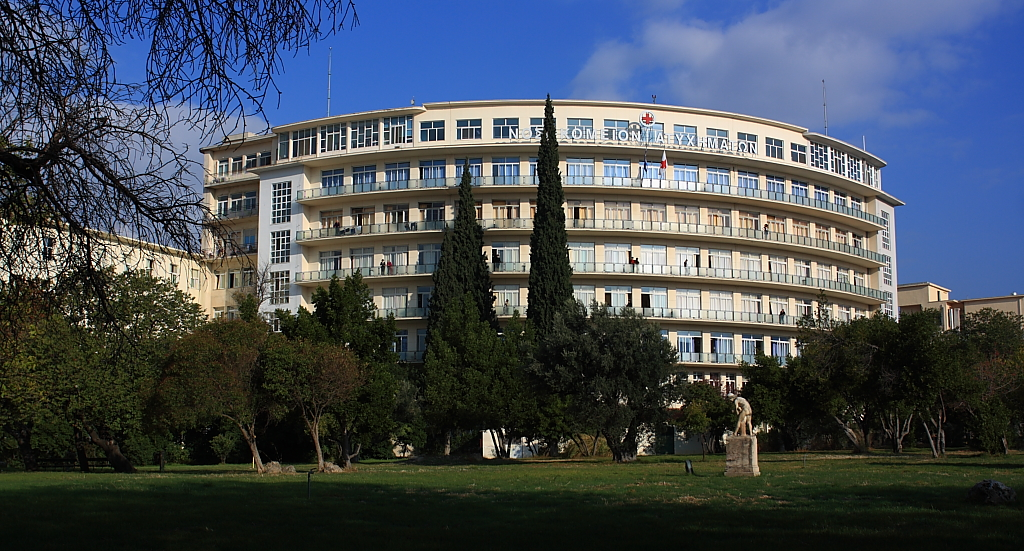
KAT Hospital, Kifissia, Athens

National Rehabilitation Center, Athens

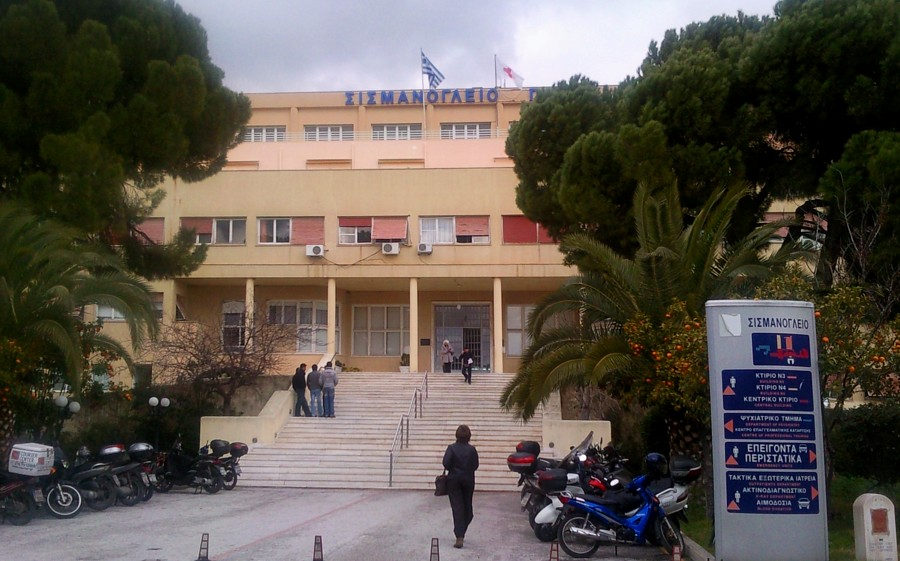
Sismanogleio General Hospital, Athens

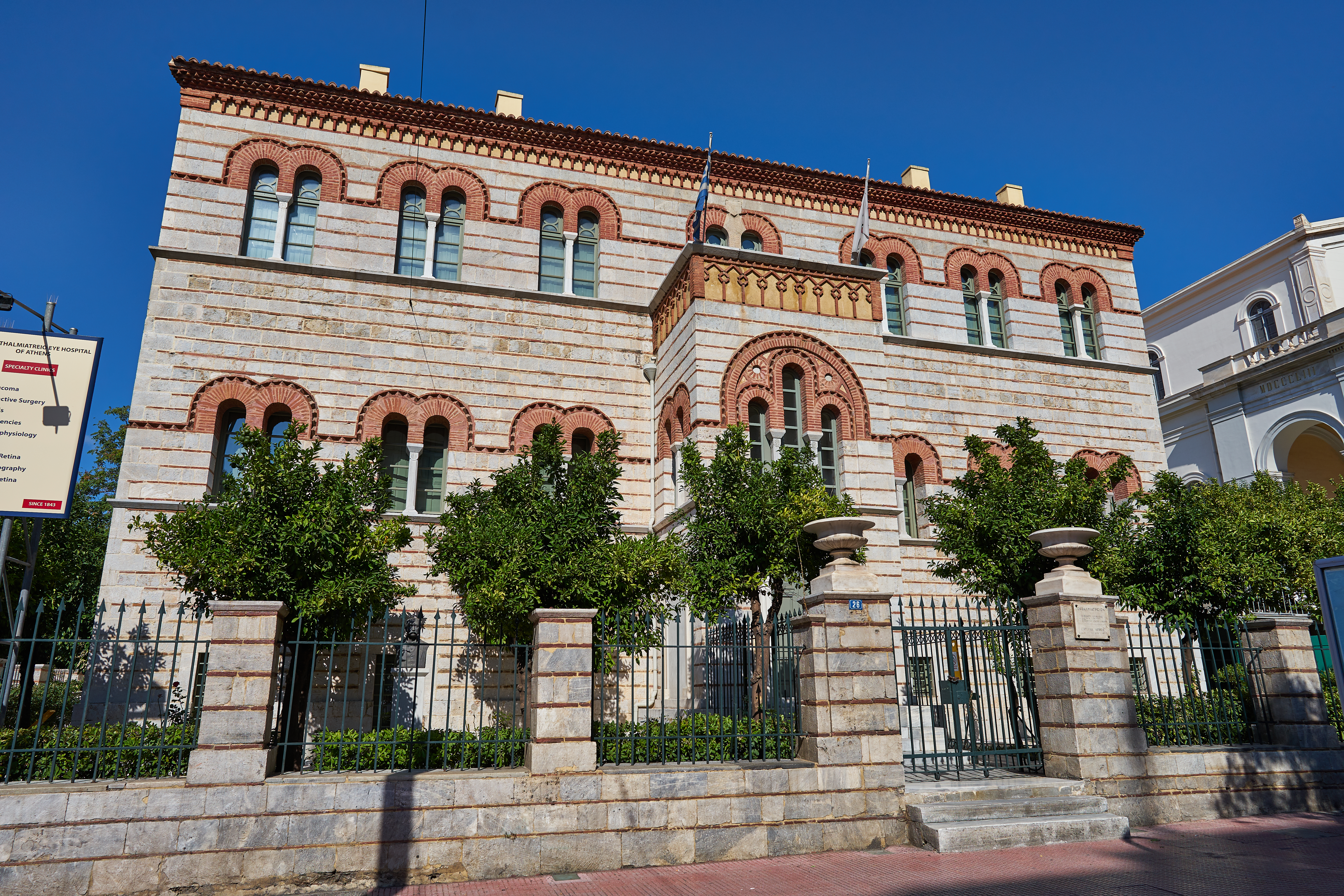
Athens Eye Hospital, Athens

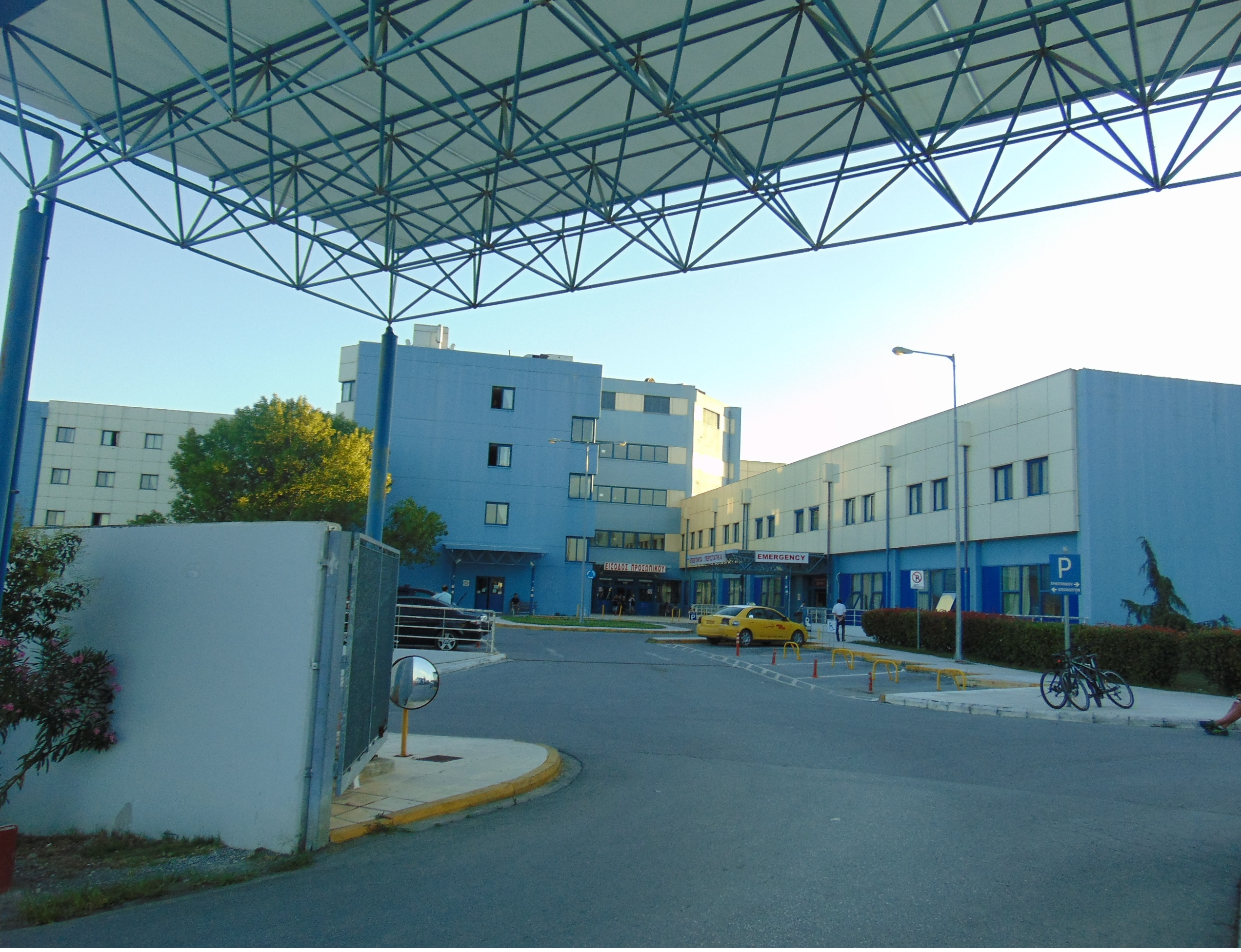
Katerini General Hospital, Katerini

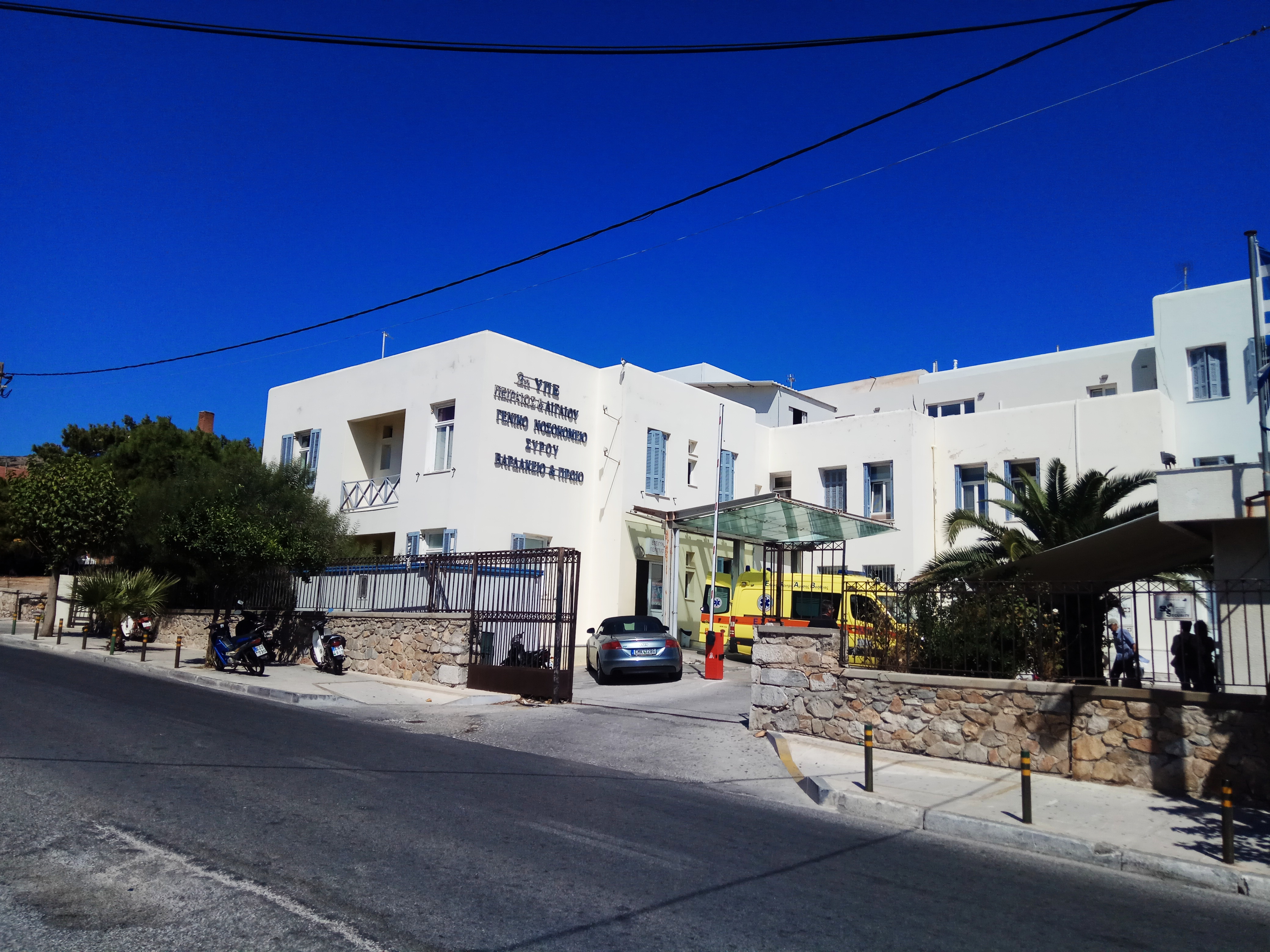
Syros General Hospital, Syros

== See also ==
In ancient Greece, temples dedicated to the healer-god Asclepius, known as Asclepeion functioned as centres of medical advice, prognosis, and healing.

- Ancient Greek medicine
- Byzantine medicine
