= 401 General Military Hospital of Athens =

401 General Military Hospital of Athens 401 Γενικό Στρατιωτικό Νοσοκομείο Αθηνών

Geography
- Location: Athens, Attica, Greece
- Coordinates: 37.99201°N 23.77695°E

Organisation
- Care system: Publicly funded health care
- Type: Clinical

Services
- Emergency department: Yes

History
- Opened: 1904; 121 years ago

Links
- Lists: Hospitals in Greece

The 401 General Military Hospital of Athens is a military nursing institution of the Hellenic Army. It was founded in 1904 and today it is the largest military hospital and one of the largest nursing institutions in Greece.

== History ==
Upon its establishment, in 1904, the hospital was established in the area close to the Petraki Monastery behind the current NIMTS. It cared for thousands of wounded and sick, from all war periods (World War I and World War II, German Occupation and Civil War), while at the same time it was the main training hospital for new medical officers and soldiers.

In 1945, it was merged with the 1st General Military Hospital, the 2nd General Military Hospital and the 1st General Military Training Hospital and was called 421 GSNE and a year later it was renamed 401 Military Hospital.

In 1954 it was renamed the 401 General Military Training Hospital. In 1958, the planning of the construction of the new facilities began, which were completed in 1970, when the hospital received its final name, 401 Athens General Military Hospital.
