= Rosita Sokou =

Greek journalist (1923–2021)

Rosita Sokou (Greek: Ζωή Μαρία (Ροζίτα) Σώκου, Zoi Maria (Rozita) Sokou; 9 September 1923 – 14 December 2021) was a Greek journalist, author, playwright and translator.

Sokou started her career as a film critic in 1946 and became one of the first women journalists in Greece. She moved to Rome, Italy after marrying an Italian journalist and author, Manlio Maradei. Having difficulty adjusting to life and career in Italy, she moved back to Greece with her daughter to resume her work. From 1977 to 1983 she became a celebrity as part of a panel in the TV show Na I Efkeria. In 1992–1993 she went on to host her own TV show on New Channel called Visitors at Night.

She translated work for many authors. She was also very involved with theatre, and wrote plays, adaptations and more. She also wrote books, and won awards from the French government and from Greece for her Greek journalism.

== Early life and education ==
Zoe Maria Sokou was born on 9 September 1923 in the Plaka neighbourhood of Athens and grew up in Psychiko. Her father, Georgios Sokos, was a journalist, editor and playwright from Aitoliko who died at the age of 44, just before World War II. Her mother Titika Michailidou came from Smyrna. Her maternal grandfather, Fotis Michailidis, was a cinema and theatre fan and made her see all films and plays available every week, and Rosita started writing reviews of what she saw while in high school. Michailidis was also the co-founder of Greek pasta manufacturer MISKO in 1927.

Rosita Sokou graduated from the Arsakeio School in Psychiko. During the war and the Axis occupation, she perfected her French at the Institut Français under Roger Milliex and English at the British Council (Cambridge Diploma of English Studies). She attended the State School of Fine Arts, which she left to study with painter Yannis Tsarouchis, who later discouraged her from becoming a painter. She attended the Vassilis Rotas Drama School for the purpose of general knowledge, while working as a translator and a foreign language teacher. After the end of the Axis occupation and the Civil War, in 1947, she attended a summer course on 20th century literature at Lady Margaret Hall College of the University of Oxford.

== Film critic ==
One of the first women journalists in Greece, Sokou started her career as a film critic. From 1946 she wrote in newspapers such as Vradini, Kathimerini, Mesimvrini, Ethnos, Acropolis, Apoghevmatini and the English-language Athens News, as well as numerous magazines. She regularly attended film festivals in Cannes, Venice, Berlin, Moscow, Taormina, Houston (Texas), and Thessaloniki, as well as the Festival dei Due Mondi in Spoleto, Italy. From the 70s, she expanded to theatre criticism and various other columns.

After her marriage to Italian journalist and author Manlio Maradei, she lived in Rome, Italy, from 1957 to 1961, but had difficulties with the life of a housewife. Her attempts to start a new career in Italian newspapers and magazines, writing in the Italian language, and to adapt to the bourgeois mentality of Italian society of the times were only moderately successful, She returned to live in Greece with her daughter, resuming her job at Kathimerini (morning paper) as well as the new Mesimvrini (evening paper) and Eikones (weekly magazine) of editor Eleni Vlachos (sometimes also spelled "Vlakhos" or "Vlachou").

In 1967, after the onset of the military dictatorship, Vlachou closed her media, in protest against the suppressed freedom of the press, and flew to London, where she stayed for the whole duration of the dictatorship. Sokou was left jobless, and with a small child to provide for. Nevertheless, she was one of the only two people (the other one was Freddie Germanos) who refused to sue Vlachou and ask for damages asking for financial compensation. For this, she faced the disciplinary board of the Journalists' Union and was threatened to be expelled from the union. She held fast: accepting to sign the lawsuit meant to recognize that Vlachou's claim (that it was impossible to have press worthy of its name in the current situation) was unsubstantial. These were difficult years, in which Sokou worked editing encyclopaedias, translating, and collaborating with magazines. She ended up, in 1969, working for the Botsis newspapers Acropolis and (from 1970) Apoghevmatini. There, she expanded to other subjects, also writing theatre, ballet and TV reviews.IOn the next decade, after becoming a well-known TV persona, she had her own full page where, every Sunday, she wrote on whatever struck her fancy.

At the end of the seven-year dictatorship, Vlachou came back to Greece and started Kathimerini again. Sokou collaborated sporadically under the pseudonym of Irene Stavrou until 1987, when the newspaper was sold to the Koskotas group. Apogevmatini eventually turned her out in 2005, after 35 years, as part of the newspaper's policy to prefer young newbie (and low-paid) journalists.

== Television ==
From 1977 to 1983, Sokou became a celebrity as part of the panel of the TV show Na I Efkeria ("Here's your chance", a Greek version of "Opportunity knocks"). These were the early days of TV, and the audience response was unprecedented. In 1992–93 she hosted her own TV show on New Channel, Visitors at Night. She welcomed the guests in her own living room, and chatted with them in an informal way, something unprecedented in the history of Greek TV.

== Translations ==
She translated many authors – Aldous Huxley, Ingmar Bergman, Isaac Asimov and Stanisław Lem – reflecting her own tastes and interests, as well as comics such as the Corto Maltese series by Hugo Pratt. She translated, edited and updated the two-volume Cinema, an encyclopedia by Georges Charensol, and was for many years co-responsible for the foreign language edition of the Athens Festival programme.

== Theatre – adaptations and translations ==
In 1974, Sokou started her deeper involvement with the theatre, writing the play The Portrait of Dorian Gray (based on Oscar Wilde's novella), and adapting Georg Büchner's Lenz for Dimitri Potamitis' Theatre of Research. Later, she translated Sam Shepard’s Shock and Edward Albee's Sea View for Yorgos Messalas' company. Together with her daughter, she translated Manjula Padmanabhan's Harvest, which was awarded 1st prize at the Onassis International Theatre Competition in 1998, and Jean Anouilh's Jesabel for Jenny Roussea's troupe in 1999.

== Original writings ==
Sokou was spurred to write a book by her chance encounter and subsequent decade-long friendship with Rudolf Nureyev. It started with an impassioned account of their meeting and a biography, in the book Nureyev (1982).

The life of the late Greek ballet dancer Anastassios Vitoros inspired the little book Anastassios (1985).

The book on Nureyev was followed, almost ten years later, by the play Quai Voltaire (1991), inspired by her experiences in the ballet scene – Quai Voltaire being the address of Nureyev's Paris flat.

After the artist's death, Sokou, with the help of her daughter, greatly expanded that first work in Nureyev – as I knew him (2003), which not only updated the contents of the first book, but also included her day-by day diaries when she travelled to London, Paris and Vienna for the rehearsals and first production of his main works there, giving a behind-the scenes glimpse of the artists and technicians responsible for these grand performances.

In 2005, she wrote Mario and I, a biography of Greek singer Mario Frangoulis and an account of her long-time friendship with him. It was published by Kastaniotis editions.

In 2018, she published her two-volume autobiography, titled Rosita's Century (O aionas tis Rositas), ranging from her grandparents' eloping in Smyrna to the present day. Volume 1 covers the first half of the 20th century, roughly until her marriage and moving to Italy, and volume 2 the years of her marriage, motherhood, return to Greece and most of her career as a journalist, including the many people, famous or not famous, she met in her long life.

The book was compiled from chapters and pages written by her in the previous 20 years or so, integrated with info from her articles and interviews. It was checked and edited by her daughter, Irene Maradei, who also wrote the preface. A revised and expanded edition was planned for the end of 2021.

== Teaching ==
In the years before her death, Sokou taught Theatrical History at the Melissa Drama School created by Elda Panopoulou and at the Piraeus Union Drama School.

== Awards ==
She was given the medal "Chevalier de l' Ordre des Arts et des Lettres" by the French government (1986), and awarded by the Botsis Foundation (1988) for her contribution to Greek journalism.

== Personal life and death ==
Sokou died from COVID-19 at Alexandra Hospital on 14 December 2021, at age 98.

== Works ==
=== Articles ===
Newspapers

- Oi kairoi (1948–50)
- Anexartisia (1949)
- Vradini (1949–1955)
- Athens News (1952–1960)
- Kathimerini (1953–1957, 1960–1967, 1974–1987)
- Mesimvrini (1961–1965)
- Acropolis (1969–)
- Apoghevmatini (1970–2005)
- Ethnos tis Kyriakis
- Kosmos tou ependyti

Magazines

- Hollywood (1946)
- Eikones (1953–1957, 1961–1967)
- Ekloghi (1955–1961)
- Epikaira (1967)
- Proto (1967–68)
- Paidi kai Neoi goneis
- Tilerama (1984–2005)

=== TV and radio shows ===
Radio

- Lithoi kai keramoi – with Kostas Ferris
- Episkeptes tis nichtas – with various guests

TV

- Na i efkairia (Here is your chance) (1977–1983), member of the panel
- Oneira sto fos: Na i efkairia – new version, 1997 on Channel 5
- Oi episkeptes tis nychtas (The night visitors) (1992–1993), New Channel

Films

- Pros tin eleftheria (by Haris Papadopoulos), 1996

=== Translations ===
Books and comics

- Bergman: The trilogy of silence (3 screenplays), ed. Galaxias
- Bergman: Three screenplays: Wild strawberries, The seventh seal, ed. Galaxias, reprinted by ed. Hermias, ISBN 960-216-039-X
- Aldous Huxley: The genius and the goddess
- Stanislaw Lem: Cyberiad (1979), ed. Kaktos
- Stanislaw Lem: Solaris (1961), ed. Kastaniotis
- Isaac Asimov: I, Robot ed. Galaxias
- Fantastika diighimata (anthology of science fiction short stories), ed. Galaxias, 1961
- Chanel la solitaire, ed. Galaxias
- Charensol: Histoire du cinema, ed. Papyros-Larousse
- Corto Maltese (many titles), for Mammouth Comics editions

Theatre

- Shock – by Sam Shepard, 1995
- Sea View – by Edward Albee, 1996
- Harvest – by Manjula Padmanabhan (with I. Maradei), 1988
- Jesabel – by Jean Anouilh (with I. Maradei), 1999

=== Theatrical adaptions ===
- Lenz, from the work of Georg Büchner
- The Portrait of Dorian Gray – from Oscar Wilde's 1977 novella, for Dimitri Potamitis, also produced in 2000 with Stratos Tzortzoglou in the leading role

=== Original writings ===
- "The encephalopod" – science fiction short story, first published in Italia domani magazine (Rome, 1960) and in Greek, in Ekloghi magazine #183 (19-6-1960)
- Nureyev – about her first meeting with the famous dancer/choreographer, ed. Kaktos, Athens, 1982
- Anastassios – a profile of the late ballet dancer Anastasios Vitoros, ed. Kaktos, Athens, 1985
- Nureyev – as I knew him – expanded version, a full biography, with the collaboration of Irene Maradei, ed. Kaktos, Athens, 2003 ISBN 960-382-503-4
- Quai Voltaire – theatrical play, ed. Hatzinikoli, Athens, 1990–91
- Mario and I, about singer Mario Frangoulis, ed. Kastaniotis, December 2005 ISBN 960-03-4126-5
- Rosita's Century, a two-volume autobiography edited by her daughter Irene Maradei, ed. Odos Panos, November 2018 ISBN 9789604773039
