= Lina Koutifari =

Greek politician

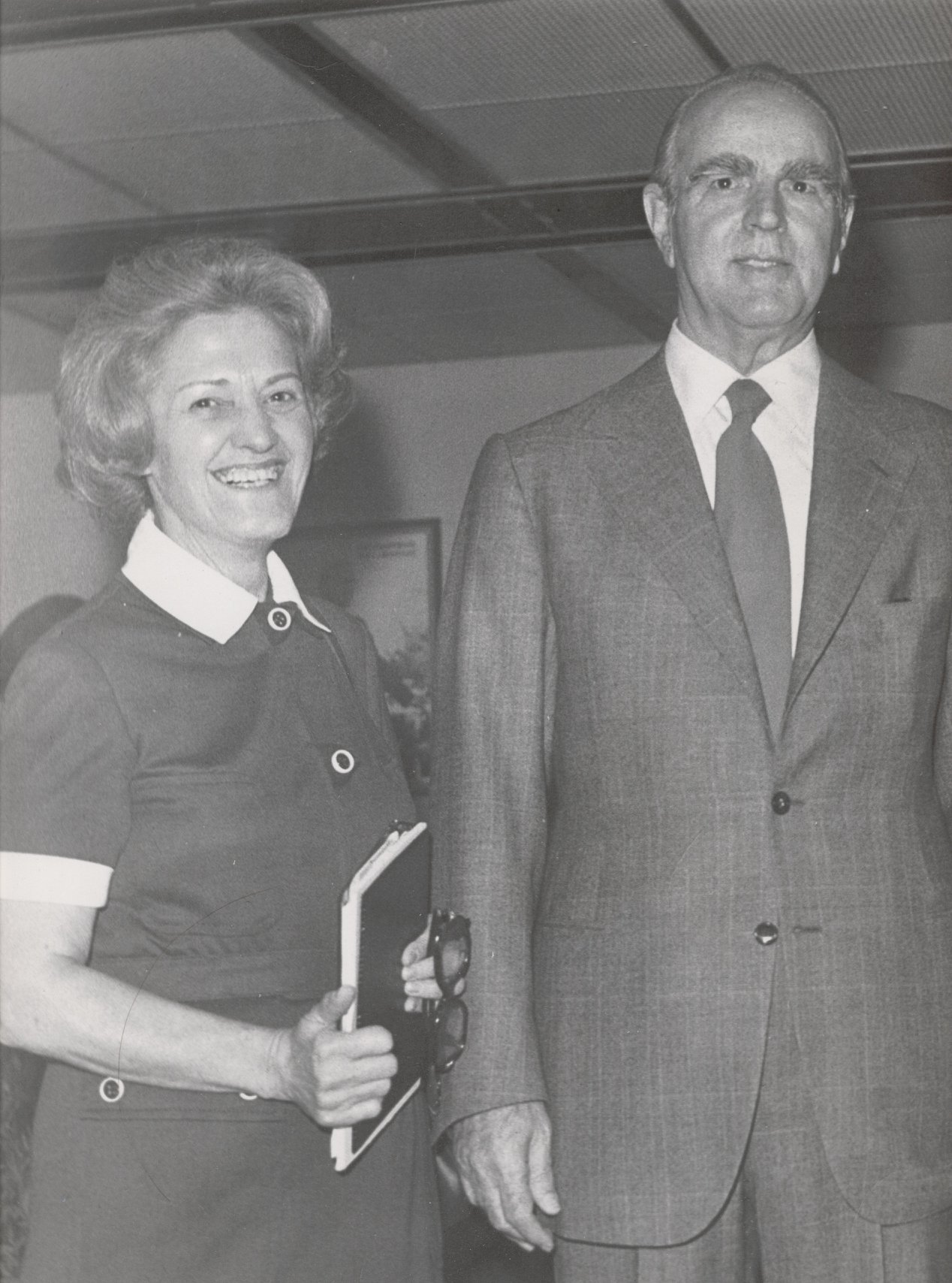
- Lina Koutifari (left)

Deputy Minister of Education and Religious Affairs
- In office September 10, 1976 – October 1977
- Prime Minister: Konstantinos Karamanlis
- Preceded by: Athanasiou Taliadourou, Chrysostomou Karapieri
- Succeeded by: Vasiliou Kontogiannopolou, Hari Karaza

Personal details
- Born: Pavlina Tsakiris; 1921 Smyrna, Ottoman Empire
- Died: March 22, 1991 Greece
- Spouse: Vasilios Koutifaris
- Children: 2
- Profession: Cytologist, professor

Lina Koutifari (Greek: Λίνα Κουτήφαρη) (1921 – March 22, 1991), née Tsakiris, was a Greek doctor, professor, and MP from Smyrna, modern İzmir.

== Biography ==
She was born Pavlina Tsakiris in Smyrna.

Koutifari studied under Georgios Papanikolaou in the USA. In 1954, she founded the cytology department at the Alexandra Hospital in Athens. She was the first Greek cytologist to practice in Greece.

She was elected to the Greek parliament on November 17, 1974. Koutifari was a member of the New Democracy Party. She represented the Municipality of Athens. She was appointed the Deputy Minister of National Education and Religious Affairs in September 1976 by Konstantinos Karamanlis, and she resigned in October 1977. While serving as an MP, she lectured at the University of Athens medical school. She was also the chief of the Greek delegation to the 1975 World Conference on Women.

She believed that a woman's first duty was to her children and that women belonged in the home.

Koutifari died on March 22, 1991.
