= Agios Andreas Hospital =

Coordinates: 38.2338°N 21.7477°E

Agios Andreas General Hospital of Patras
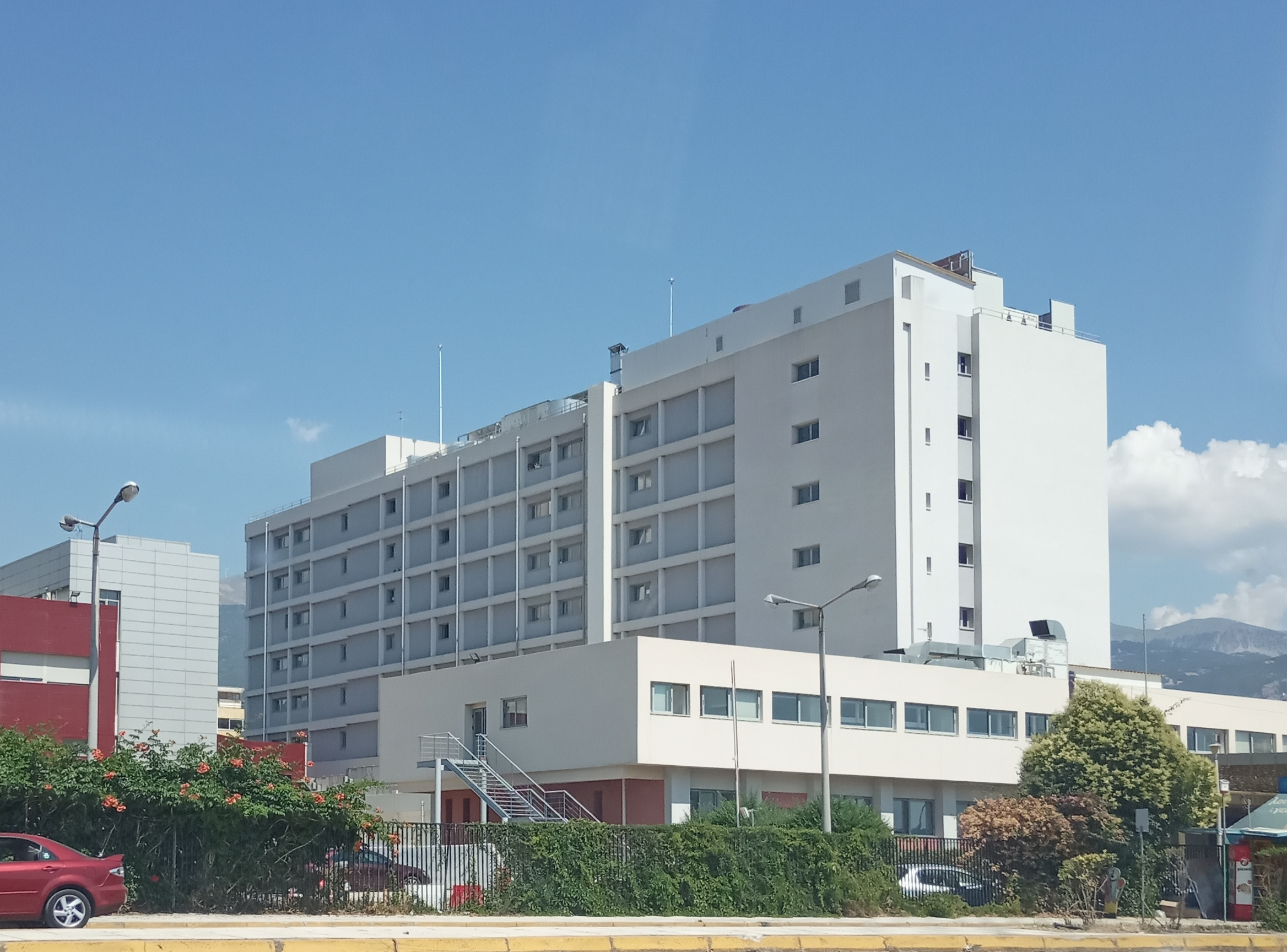
- Agios Andreas hospital, view of the renovated multi-storey building (2020)

Geography
- Location: Patras, Achaia, Greece

Organisation
- Care system: Publicly funded health care
- Type: Clinical

Services
- Emergency department: Yes
- Beds: 400

History
- Founded: 1872; 154 years ago

Links
- Website: http://www.agandreashosp.gr/
- Lists: Hospitals in Greece

Agios Andreas Hospital (Greek: Γενικό Νοσοκομείο Πατρών "Ο Άγιος Ανδρέας") is a hospital in Patras, Achaea, Greece. It is the second largest hospital in the city of Patras and one of the largest in Peloponnese with a total capacity of 400 beds (188 beds in the Internal Medicine sector and 192 beds in the surgical sector). It first operated as the Municipal Hospital of Patras on January 1, 1872, and was renamed to its current name when it was transferred to the current building.

The hospital occupies 5 buildings of which the 3 are situated close to each other. The main multi-storey building of the hospital (built in 1973) was struck by an earthquake in 2008 and it is completely restored. Additionally, the central building is upgraded with new medical and hotel equipment. The renovated 7-storey building was finally inaugurated in July 2017 after 3 years of delays. This multi-storey building houses the departments of ophthalmology and otorhinolaryngology, plastic surgery and urology (6th floor), internal medicine/pathology and cardiology, paediatrics, obstetrics and gynaecology. In 2011, the construction of a new wing (two-storey building) was completed and today in houses three clinics: The surgery clinic, the pathology clinic and the orthopaedic clinic.

== Notable visits ==
In January 1997, President Stephanopoulos and Health Minister Geitonas visited the hospital for the opening of its kidney disease wing and library.

== Photo gallery ==
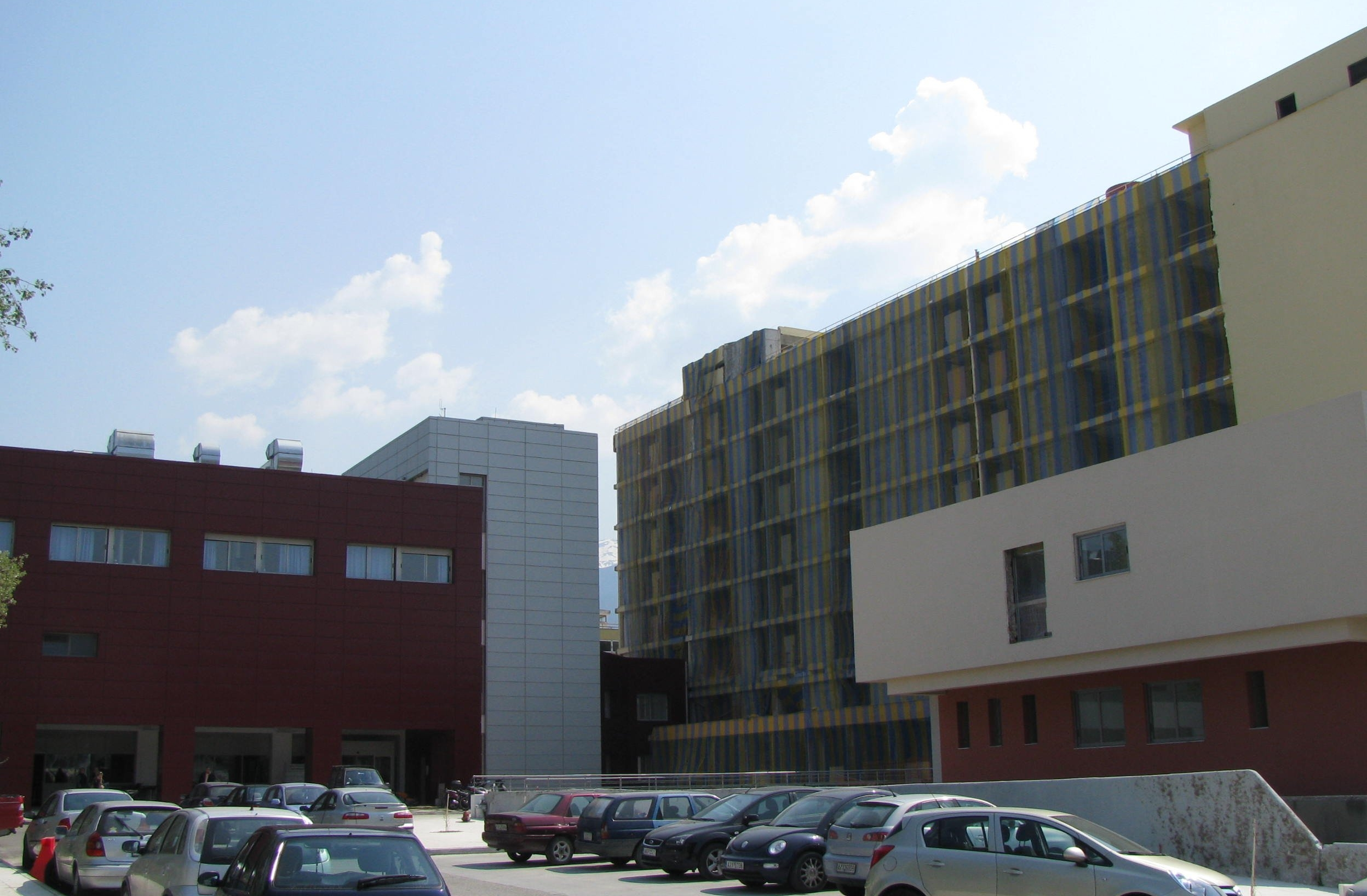
Partial view of the main multi-story building (under construction) and the new two-story building

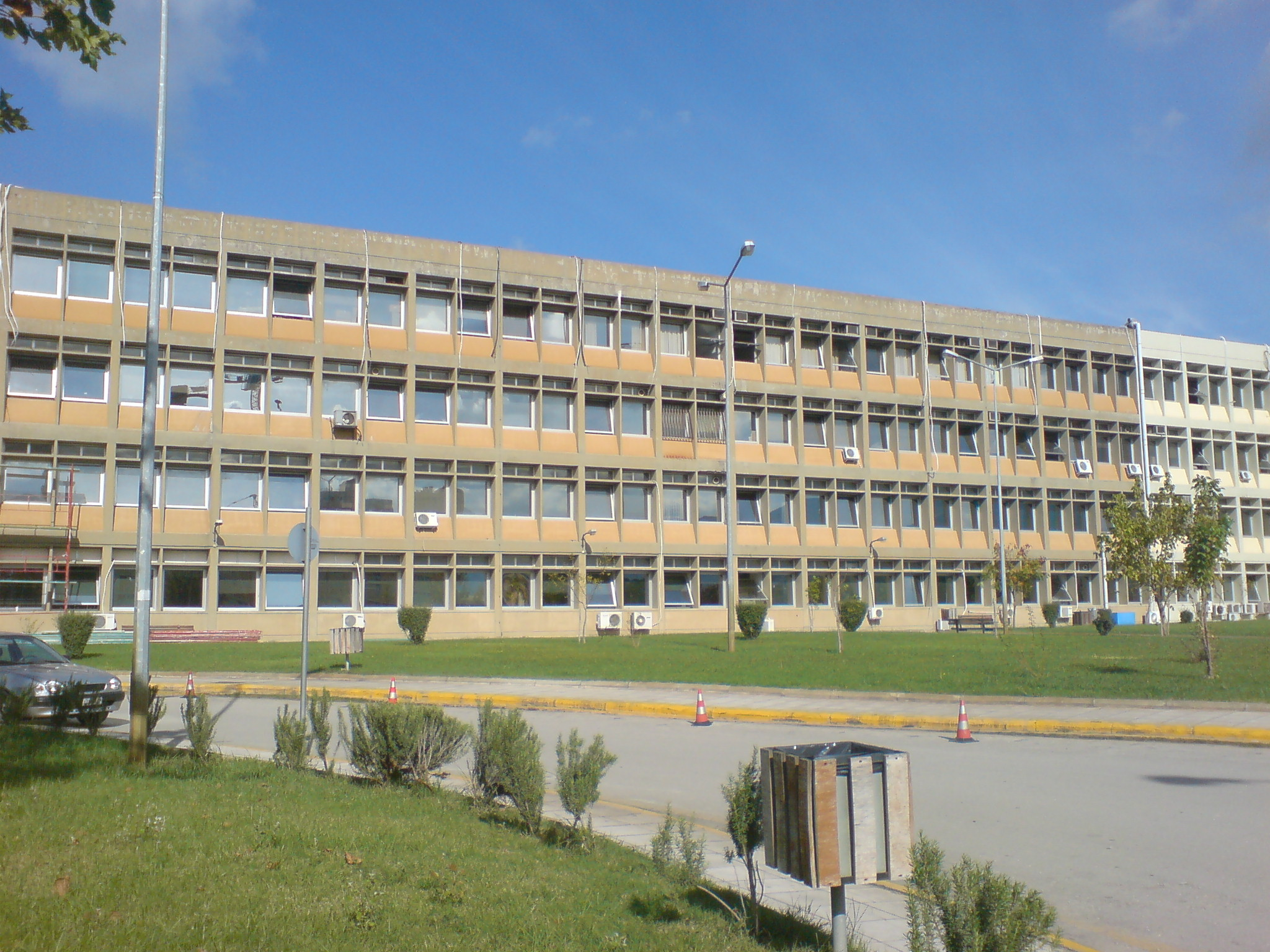
Three-storey building close to the main buildings.

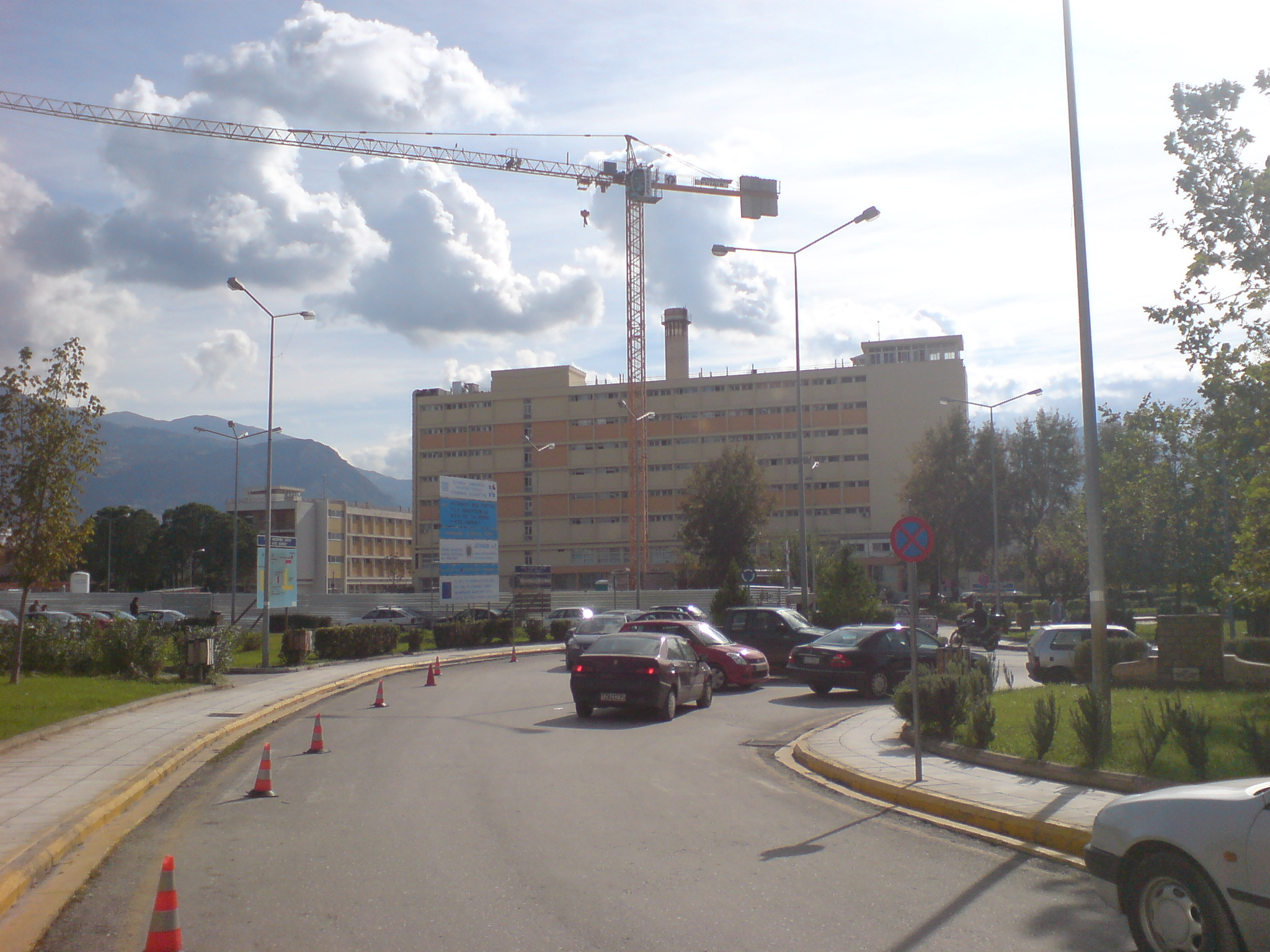
View of the multi-storey building before the renovation

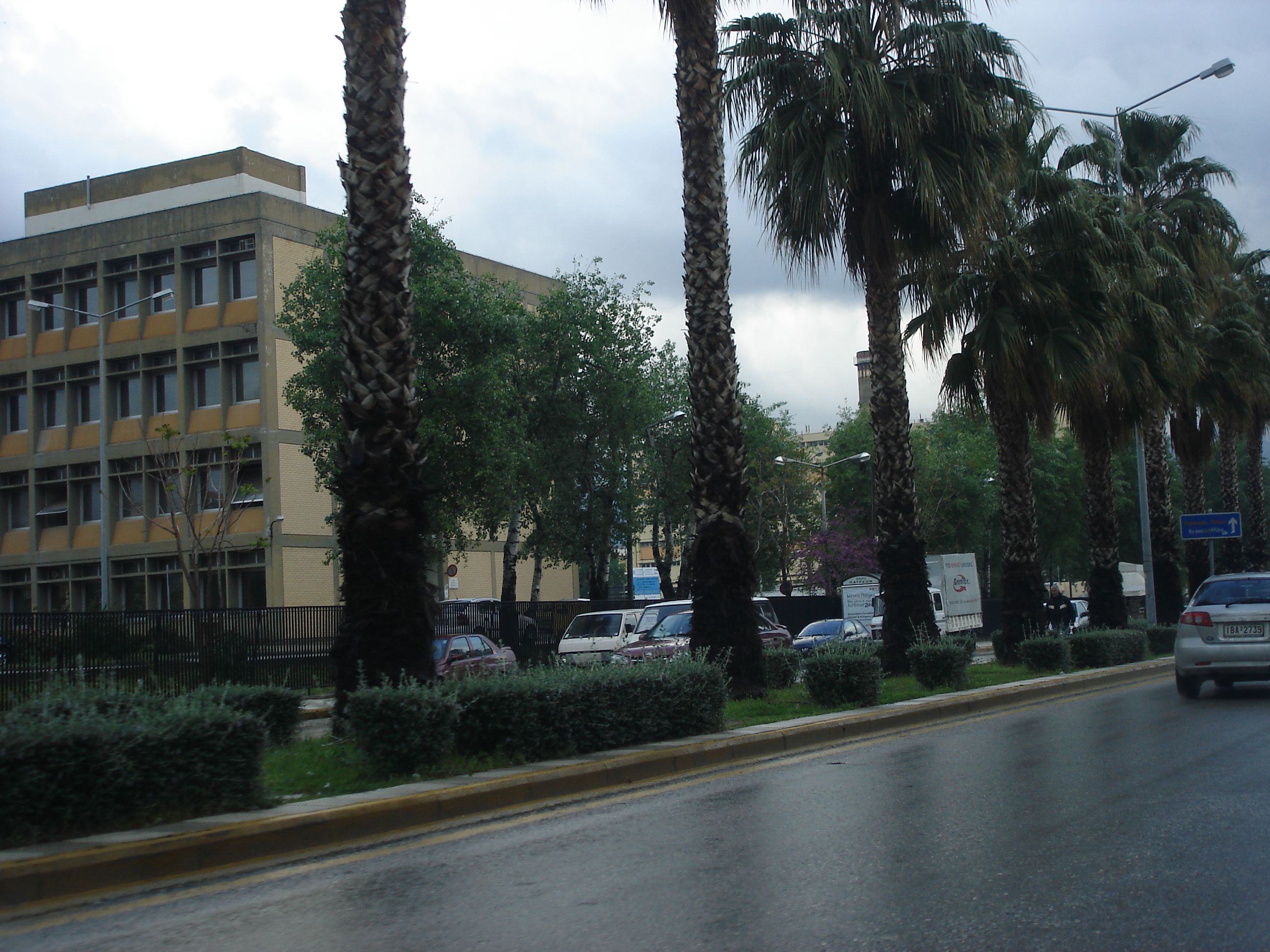
View from the street
