= Sismanogleio General Hospital =

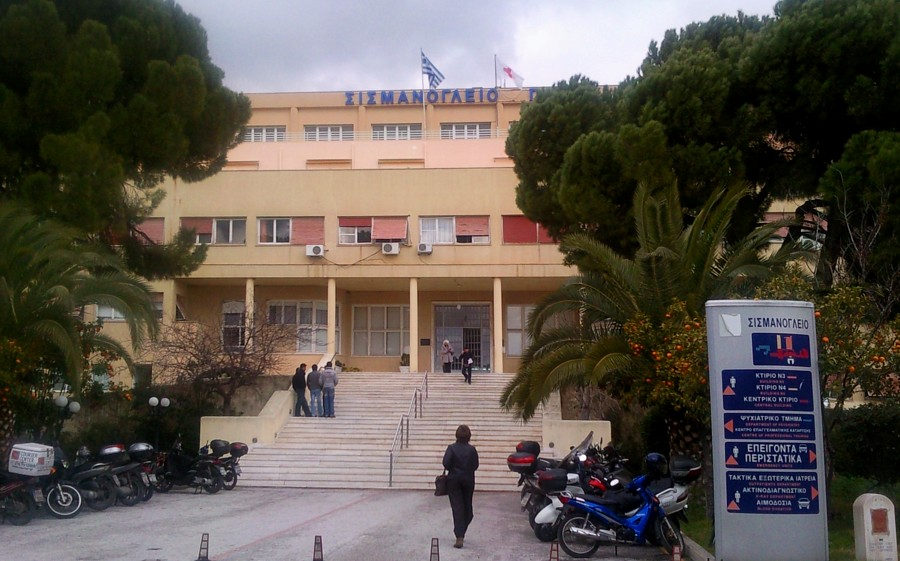

Geography
- Location: Vrilissia, Athens, Greece
- Coordinates: 38.046°N 23.828°E

Organisation
- Type: General

Links
- Website: www.sismanoglio.gr
- Lists: Hospitals in Greece

Sismanogleio General Hospital (Γενικό Νοσοκομείο Σισμανόγλειο) in Vrilissia, Athens is one of the largest public hospitals in Greece. Its name in Katharevousa is Sismanogleion (Σισμανόγλειον).

During the 2009 swine flu pandemic Seismanogleion treated the first swine flu patient in Greece.
