= Agia Sofia Children's Hospital =

Agia Sofia Children's Hospital Νοσοκομείο Παίδων "Η Αγία Σοφία"

Geography
- Location: Athens, Attica, Greece
- Coordinates: 37.9849°N 23.7688°E

Organisation
- Care system: Publicly funded health care of children
- Type: Clinical

Services
- Emergency department: Yes
- Beds: 750

History
- Opened: 1901; 124 years ago

Links
- Website: https://paidon-agiasofia.gr/
- Lists: Hospitals in Greece

The Agia Sofia Children's Hospital is one of the largest pediatric hospitals at the European level and the largest pediatric hospital in Greece. It was founded in 1896 and started operating in 1901.

Its hospital beds amount to 750. It is for children up to 16 years of age, but in some special cases it also accepts older children.

In 2020, the Agia Sofia Children's Hospital completed renovation of its cardiology unit with 20 beds.
