= KAT Hospital =

KAT Attica General Hospital
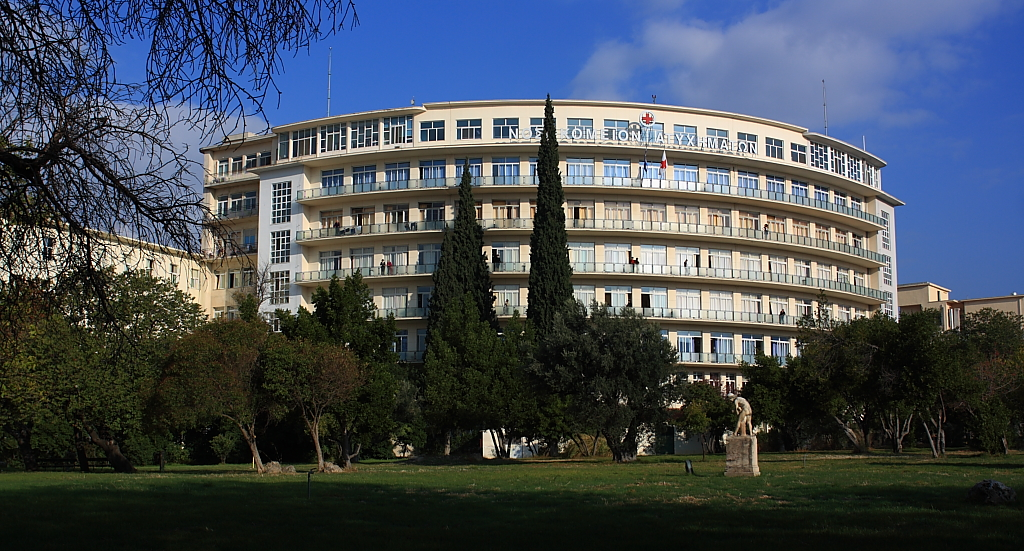

Geography
- Location: Nikis 2, Kifisia, Athens, Greece
- Coordinates: 38.0660°N 23.8080°E

Organisation
- Care system: National Healthcare System (Greece)
- Type: Teaching
- Affiliated university: University of Athens

Services
- Standards: 3rd Stage Healthcare
- Emergency department: Yes
- Beds: 650
- Speciality: General / Orthopaedic / Trauma Center
- Helipad: Yes

History
- Opened: 1963

Links
- Website: www.kat-hosp.gr
- Lists: Hospitals in Greece

KAT Attica General Hospital (Greek: Γενικό Νοσοκομείο Αττικής ΚΑΤ), also known as KAT Hospital, is a tertiary-level hospital in the Attica region of Greece. It is located in Kifisia, a northern suburban of Athens. It was formerly known as the "Apostolos Pavlos" Accident Hospital.

== KAT Hospital ==
KAT is one of the largest hospitals in Attica with a clear orientation in orthopedics and traumatology so it has been established in the consciousness of the citizens as the hospital for accidents and fractures. It is part of the Greek National Healthcare System and belongs to the 1st Health District of Attica. The hospital owes its name to the 449 Wound Rehabilitation Center (449 KAT) hospital that operated after the war for the rehabilitation of war wounded.

== Citations ==
- linkedin.com
- expedia.com

=== References ===
- "Fifteen employees at KAT Trauma hospital indicted". Ekathimerini News. April 20, 2018.
