= Athens Naval Hospital =

Geography
- Location: Dinokratous 70, Athens, Greece
- Coordinates: 37.9814°N 23.7511°E

Organisation
- Care system: National Healthcare System
- Affiliated university: Hellenic Navy

Services
- Beds: 234

History
- Opened: 1955

Links
- Website: https://nna.hellenicnavy.gr/
- Other links: https://nna.hellenicnavy.gr/istoriko-nna/

The Athens Naval Hospital (Greek: Ναυτικό Νοσοκομείο Αθηνών, ΝΝΑ) is the largest Navy hospital in Greece. It is situated at the foothill of Lycabettus Hill, at Dinokratous 70 in Central Athens. Construction started in 1948, but it became operational in 1955, and was renovated and enlarged in 1995.

Since 2002, new operating theatres have been opened and the hospital's wings and buildings have been renovated.

It is the only military hospital to have been built and completed in its original form with the financial support of its active and retired officers.
