= NIMTS =

417 Army Equity Fund Hospital
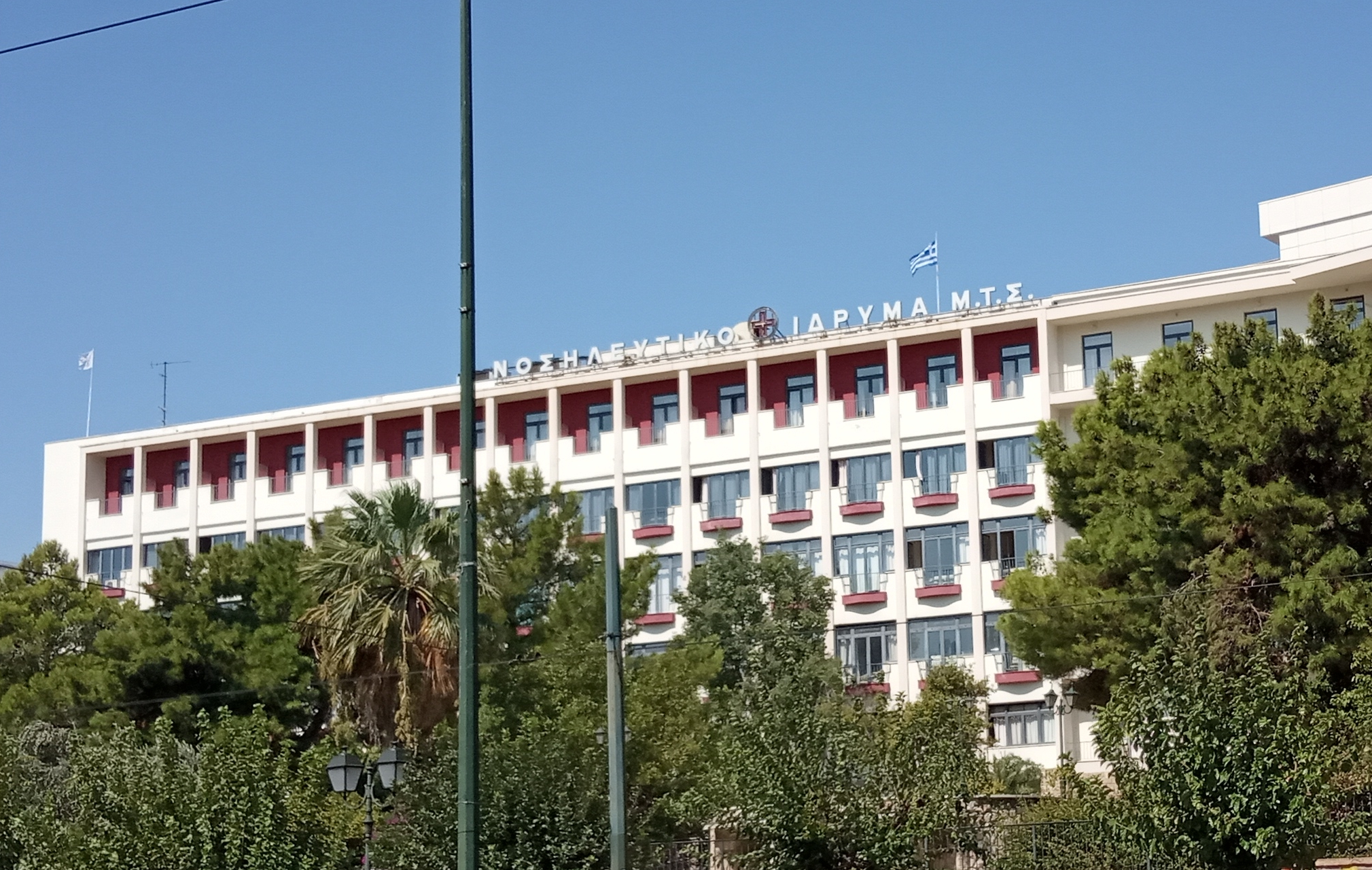
- Partial view of the main building from Vasilissis Sofias Avenue.

Geography
- Location: Athens, Attica, Greece
- Coordinates: 37.9794°N 23.7512°E

Organisation
- Care system: Public
- Type: District General

Services
- Emergency department: Yes
- Beds: 405

History
- Founded: 1946

Links
- Website: Official website (only in Greek)
- Lists: Hospitals in Greece

The 417 Army Equity Fund Hospital (Greek: 417 Νοσηλευτικό Ίδρυμα Μετοχικού Ταμείου Στρατού), commonly known by its acronym as NIMTS (Ν.Ι.Μ.Τ.Σ.), is a public general hospital located in the centre of Athens, Greece, near the Megaro Moussikis metro station.

According to its founding law (AN 1137/1946), NIMTS is a Legal Entity of Public Law, which is overseen by the Ministry of National Defence, through the Hellenic Army General Staff.

The hospital consists of two multi-storey buildings with a total capacity of 405 beds. The second building which is called the "new wing" (νέα πτέρυγα) was inaugurated in 1981. More than 100,000 patients are examined on a yearly basis and more than 15,000 patients are hospitalized. It employs around 1,000 people.

== Gallery ==
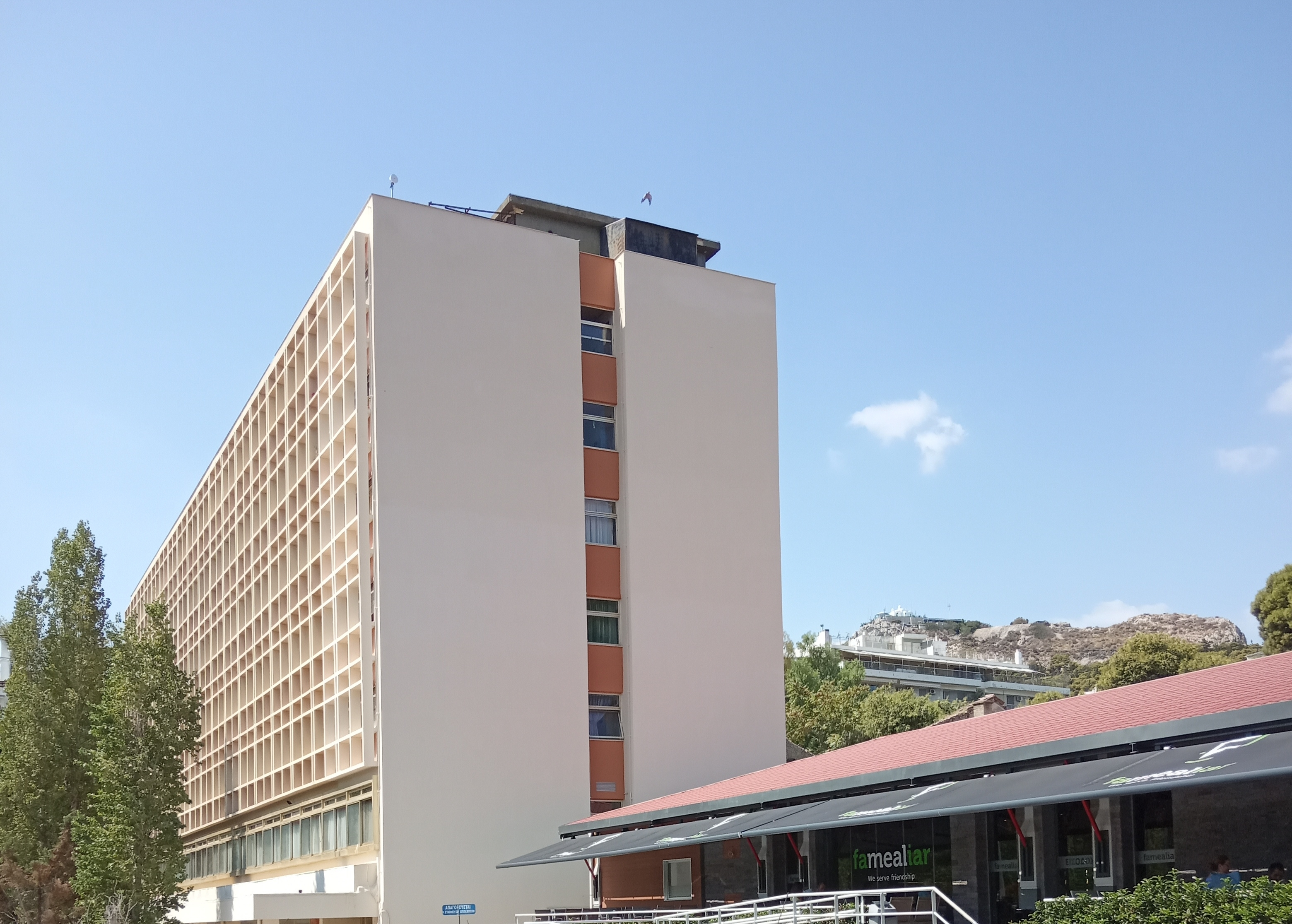
417 NIMTS second building

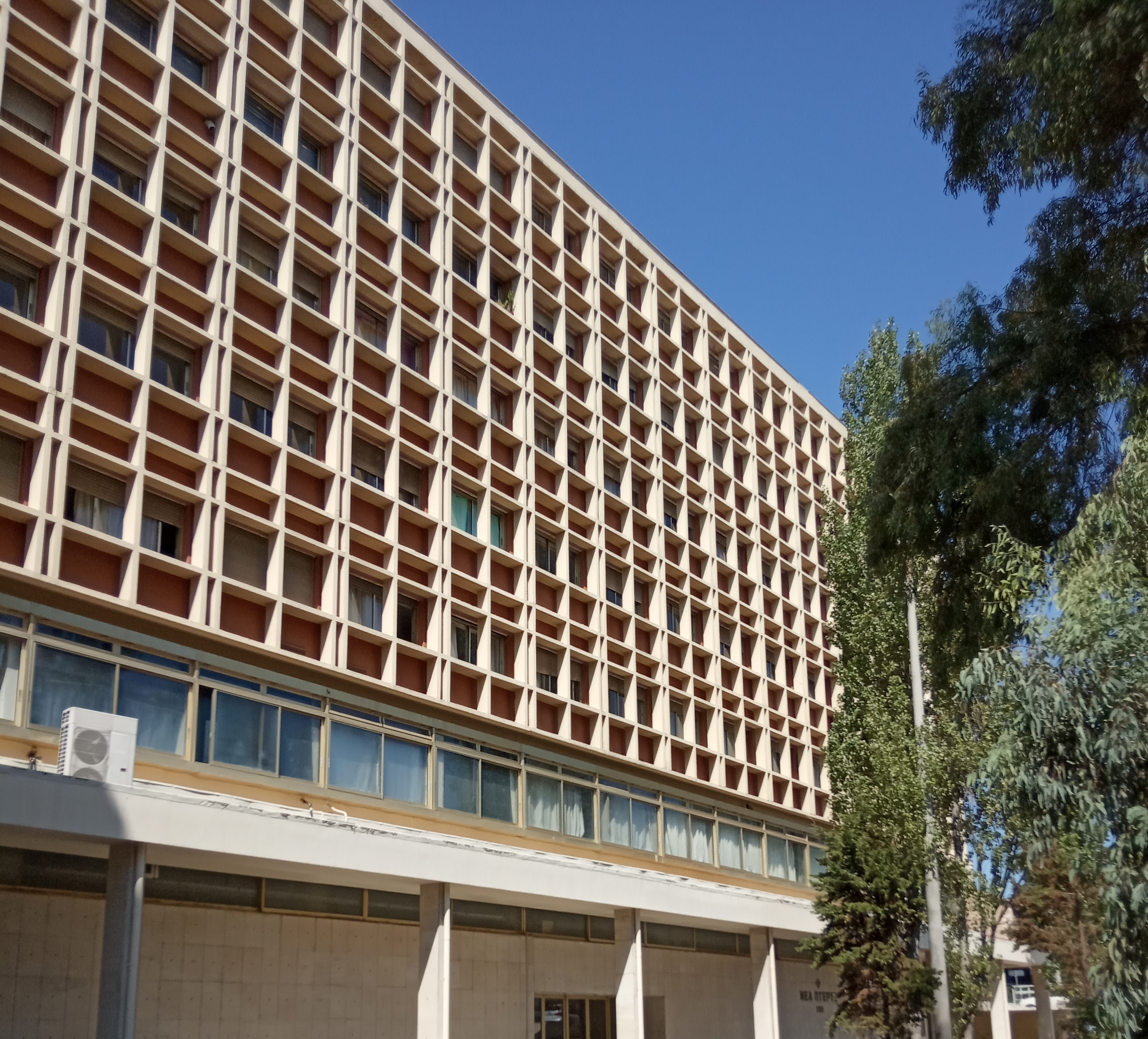
417 NIMTS second building front view
