= Alexandra Hospital (Athens) =

Coordinates: 37.9801°N 23.7552°E

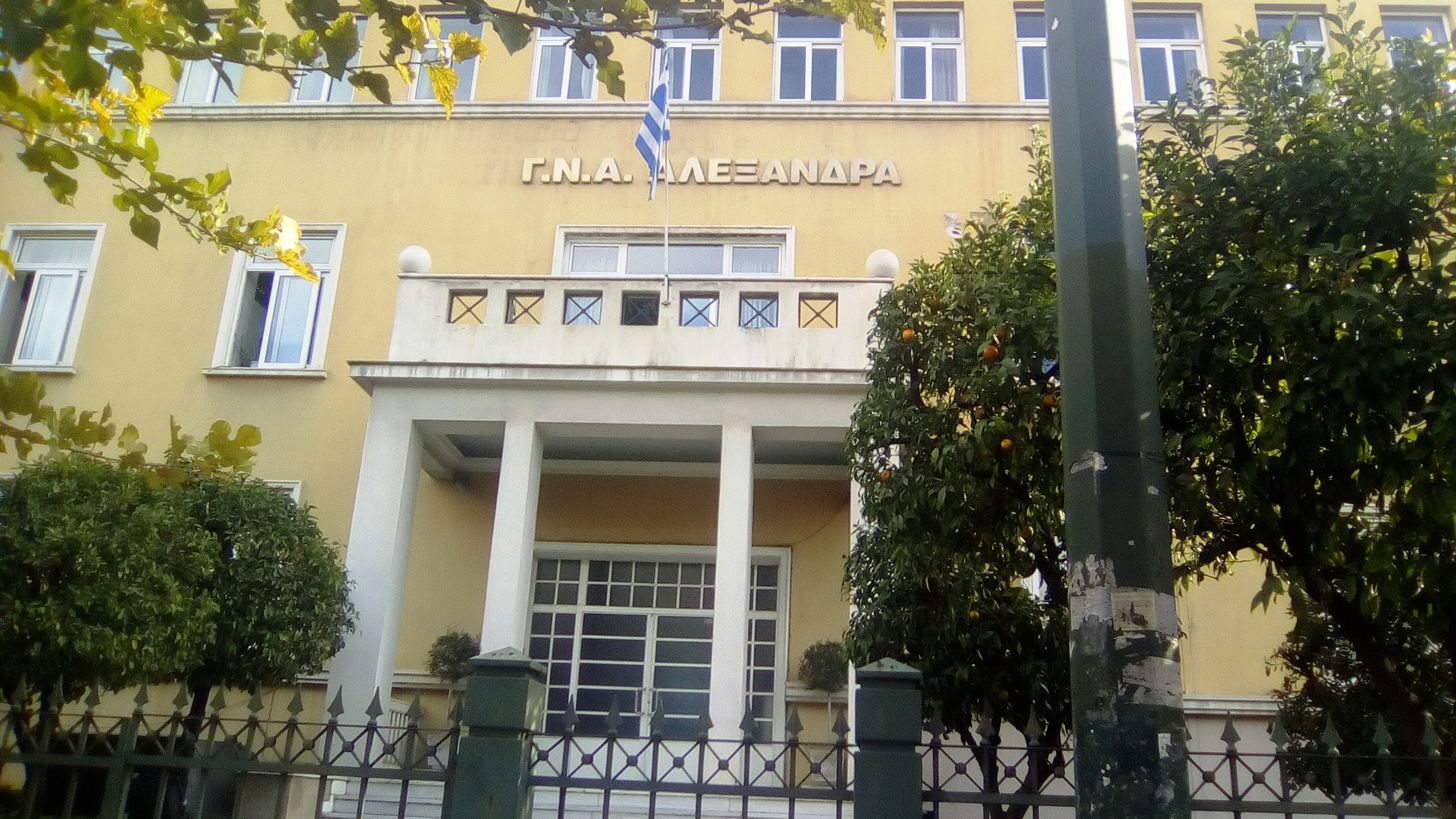
- Alexandra General Hospital

Geography
- Location: Vassilisis Sofias 80, Ilisia, Athens, Greece

Organisation
- Care system: National Healthcare System (Greece)
- Type: Teaching
- Affiliated university: University of Athens

Services
- Beds: 350

History
- Opened: 1954

Links
- Website: hosp-alexandra.gr

The Alexandra General Hospital is a General hospital in central Athens, Greece. It was established in 1954, initially as a Maternity Hospital and later as a Maternity & Obstetrics - Gynecological Hospital. It is located at Vassilisis Sofias avenue in the center of Athens. It is named after Princess Alexandra, the daughter of King George I, who became the Grand Duchess of Russia before dying during labour.
