= North Central (Nigeria) =

Geopolitical zone of Nigeria

- The six geopolitical zones of Nigeria
- Country: Nigeria
- Federal territory: Federal Capital Territory
- States: Benue State; Kogi State; Kwara State; Nasarawa State; Niger State; Plateau State
- Largest city: Abuja
- Major cities: Ilorin; Jos; Minna; Lafia; Okene; Makurdi; Agaie; Mokwa; Suleja; Lavun; Bida; Gboko; Otukpo

Population (2022 est.)
  - Total: 28,545,700
- Time zone: UTC+01:00 (WAT)
- Languages: Adara; Bassa Nge; Berom; Boghom; Dibo; Ebira; Eggon; Fulfulde; Gade; Gwari; Goemai; Gwandara; Hausa; Kakanda; Kamuku; Idoma; Igede language; Idomoid languages; Igala; Izere; Jili; Lela; Mada; Ngas; Nungu; Nupe; Ron; Shingini; Tarok; Tiv; Vadi; Wapan; Yoruba; Yiwom

The North Central (often hyphenated to the North-Central) is one of the six geopolitical zones of Nigeria representing the majority of the country's Middle Belt. It comprises six states – Benue, Kogi, Kwara, Nasarawa, Niger, and Plateau — in addition to the Federal Capital Territory.

The North Central stretches across the whole width of the country, from the border with Cameroon to that with Benin. In terms of the environment, the zone is dominated by the Guinean forest–savanna mosaic, with the western portion falling into the West Sudanian savanna ecoregion. Plateau State is also named for the Jos Plateau, which lies in the east-central portion of the zone.

The region has a population of about 20 million people, around 11% of the total population of the country. The country's capital of Abuja, which is in the Federal Capital Territory, as well as Ilorin and Jos, are the most populous cities in the North Central, as well as the sixth, seventh, and eighth most populous cities in Nigeria.
