= Polyglotta Africana =

Study published in 1854 on African languages

Polyglotta Africana is a study published in 1854 by the German missionary Sigismund Wilhelm Koelle (1823–1902), in which the author compares 280 words from 200 African languages and dialects (or about 120 separate languages according to today's classification; several varieties considered distinct by Koelle were later shown to belong to the same language). As a comparative study it was a major breakthrough at the time.

Koelle based his material on first-hand observations, mostly with freed slaves in Freetown, Sierra Leone. He transcribed the data using a uniform phonetic script. Koelle's transcriptions were not always accurate; for example, he persistently confused [s] with [z] and [tʃ] with [dʒ]. His data were consistent enough, however, to enable groupings of languages based on vocabulary resemblances. Notably, the groups which he set up correspond in a number of cases to modern groups:

- North-West Atlantic — Atlantic
- North-Western High Sudan/Mandenga — Mande
- North-Eastern High Sudan — Gur

Although Koelle's was not the first such study comparing different African languages, (for example, a missionary called John Clarke had produced a similar work in 1848, and still earlier Hannah Kilham had produced her Specimens of African Languages, Spoken in the Colony of Sierra Leone in 1828), yet in its accuracy and thoroughness it outclassed all the others and still proves useful today.

== Value of the work ==
The Polyglotta Africana was the second work carried out by Koelle during his five years in Sierra Leone, the first being a grammar of the Vai language in 1849. The idea of this was to use the fact that Sierra Leone was a melting pot of ex-slaves from all over Africa to compile a list of 280 basic words (a sort of early Swadesh list) in some 160 languages and dialects. These were then grouped as far as possible in families. Most of the informants who contributed to this work came from West Africa, but there were also others from as far away as Mozambique. One area that was lacking was the Swahili coast of Kenya and Tanzania, since it seems that slaves from this region were generally taken northwards to Zanzibar and Arabia rather than southward towards America and Brazil. The pronunciations of all the words were carefully noted using an alphabet similar, though not identical, to that devised by Karl Richard Lepsius, which was not yet available at that time. The name of the book was imitated from a well-known work called Asia Polyglotta (1823) by the German scholar Julius Klaproth.

The value of the list is not merely linguistic, since the work not only includes the words themselves, but Koelle also added a short biography of each informant, with geographical information about their place of origin, and an indication of how many other people they knew in Sierra Leone who spoke the same language. This information, combined with a census of Sierra Leone conducted in 1848, has proved invaluable to historians researching the African slave trade in the 19th century. Of the 210 informants, there were 179 ex-slaves (two of them women), while the rest were mostly traders or sailors. An analysis of the data shows that typically Koelle's informants were middle-aged or elderly men who had been living in Freetown for ten years or more. Three-quarters of the ex-slaves had left their homeland more than ten years earlier, and half of them more than 20 years before; and three-quarters of the informants were over 40 years old. Another interesting facet of the book is the manner in which the informants had been made slaves. Some had been captured in war, some kidnapped, some sold by a relative, others condemned for a debt or sentenced for a crime.

Included with a book is a map of Africa showing the approximate location, as far as it could be ascertained, of each language, prepared by the cartographer August Heinrich Petermann.

== The transcription ==
It was Koelle's aim not to use any previously published material on the languages he was writing down, but to achieve uniformity by having one person using a single phonetic system for every language. The orthography he eventually chose, after discussions in London, was not that of Karl Richard Lepsius (as is sometimes claimed), since it had not yet been published, but was based on a short document issued in 1848 by Henry Venn of the Church Missionary Society entitled Rules for Reducing Unwritten Languages to Alphabetical Writing in Roman Characters With Reference Specially to the Languages Spoken in Africa. The aim of this was to produce a simple practical system of orthography for teaching purposes with the use of as few diacritics as possible. Koelle, however, sought a more accurate phonetic system, and added diacritics. He retained seven of the eight vowels of Venn's system (i, e, ẹ, a, ọ, o, u, omitting ạ as in "but") but added length marks, a dot for nasalisation, and an accent to indicate the prominent syllable. (Unlike in Lepsius's alphabet, the dotted ẹ and ọ are open not closed sounds.) He modified Venn's alphabet by writing dṣ for the sound of "judge" or "church" (apparently confusing these two), and n followed by a dot (n˙) for the "ng" sound of "sing". When Koelle learnt of Lepsius's alphabet in 1854, he made immediate use of it in his Kanuri grammar, in which he wrote:

"I much regret that this System was not propounded sooner, so that I might also have adopted it in my Vei-Grammar and Polyglotta Africana. Happily, however, the Orthography which I employed in those books already so nearly approaches the System of Prof. Lepsius, as to only require some minor alterations."

== Koelle's word list ==
In the introduction Koelle tells us that he wanted a selection of words that would be simple enough for each informant to be interviewed on a single day, and for this reason he omitted pronouns, which would have taken much longer to elicit. He adds that a few years earlier during a long vacation he had made a similar such list, of just 71 languages, and that in making the present list he had learnt from that experience.

The actual list (the spelling is Koelle's) is as follows:

1. One
2. Two
3. Three
4. Four
5. Five
6. Six
7. Seven
8. Eight
9. Nine
10. Ten
11. Eleven
12. Twelve
13. Thirteen
14. Fourteen
15. Fifteen
16. Sixteen
17. Seventeen
18. Eighteen
19. Nineteen
20. Twenty
21. Man
22. Woman
23. Boy
24. Girl
25. Father
26. Mother
27. Grandfather
28. Grandmother
29. Son
30. Daughter
31. Elder Brother
32. Younger Brother
33. Elder Sister
34. Younger Sister
35. Friend
36. Stranger
37. King
38. Male Slave
39. Female Slave
40. Doctor
41. Medicine
42. Head
43. Hair
44. Face
45. Forehead
46. Nose
47. Eye
48. Ear
49. Mouth
50. Tooth
51. Tongue
52. Throat
53. Gullet
54. Neck
55. Shoulder
56. Arm
57. Arm between Shoulder and Elbow
58. Arm between Elbow and Wrist
59. Leg
60. Outer Hand, or Hand
61. Inner Hand
62. Foot, or Instep of the Foot
63. Foot-sole
64. Finger
65. Toe
66. Elbow
67. Rib
68. Chest
69. Female breast
70. Belly
71. Navel
72. Thigh
73. Knee
74. Heel
75. Nail (of Finger and Toe)
76. Skin
77. Bone
78. Vein
79. Blood
80. Itch
81. Small-pox
82. Hat
83. Cap
84. Shoe
85. Shirt
86. Trousers
87. Waist-cloth
88. Town (Village)
89. Market
90. House
91. Door
92. Doorway
93. Bed
94. Mat
95. Knife
96. Spoon
97. Ear-ring
98. Armlet or Bracelet
99. Pot
100. Calabash
101. Gun
102. Powder
103. Sword
104. Spear
105. Bow
106. Arrow
107. Quiver
108. War
109. God
110. Devil
111. Idol
112. Greegree
113. Sacrifice
114. Heaven (sky)
115. Hell
116. Fire
117. Water
118. Soup
119. Meat (often Animal)
120. Salt
121. Gold
122. Iron
123. Stone
124. Hoe
125. Axe
126. Book
127. Ink
128. Sun
129. Moon (? full)
130. New Moon
131. Day
132. Night
133. Dry Season
134. Rainy Season
135. Rain
136. Dew
137. Coal
138. Smoke
139. Soap
140. Sand
141. Canoe
142. Bench, Chair
143. Needle
144. Thread
145. Rope
146. Chain (Fetters?)
147. Drum
148. Tree
149. Firewood
150. Walking-stick
151. Leaf
152. Root
153. Palm-tree
154. Palm-Oil
155. Guinea-Corn (bearing like Maize)
156. Kuskus (bearing like Oats)
157. Cotton
158. Cotton-plant (a Shrub)
159. Cotton-tree
160. Camwood
161. Rice (uncooked)
162. Yam
163. Cassada
164. Ground-nut
165. Pepper
166. Onion
167. Maize
168. Beans
169. Farm
170. Forest
171. Horse
172. Mare
173. Cow
174. Bull
175. Milk
176. Butter
177. Ewe (Sheep)
178. Ram (Sheep)
179. Goat
180. Buck
181. Cat
182. Rat
183. Pig
184. Bat
185. Pigeon
186. Parrot
187. Fowl (Hen)
188. Cock
189. Egg
190. Bird
191. Fish
192. Serpent
193. Scorpion
194. Mosquito
195. Butterfly
196. Spider
197. Wasp
198. Bee
199. Honey
200. Lion
201. Leopard
202. Elephant
203. Ivory
204. Alligator
205. Monkey
206. Chamelion
207. Lizard (the common one)
208. The large red-headed Lizard
209. Toad
210. Frog
211. Dog
212. Great, large
213. Little, small
214. White
215. Black
216. White Man
217. Black Man (Negro)
218. Good
219. Bad
220. Old
221. New (young)
222. Sick
223. Well
224. Hot
225. Cold
226. Wet
227. Dry
228. Greedy
229. Stupid
230. Rich
231. Poor
232. Straight
233. Crooked (bent)
234. I go
235. I come
236. I run
237. I stop
238. I sit down
239. I lie down
240. I breathe
241. I cough
242. I sneeze
243. I snore
244. I laugh
245. I weep
246. I kneel
247. I dream
248. I sleep
249. I die
250. I fall
251. I rise
252. I speak
253. I hear
254. I beg
255. I bathe (wash myself)
256. I see
257. I take
258. I buy
259. I sell
260. I love thee
261. I give thee
262. I eat rice (yam)
263. I drink water
264. I cook meat
265. I kill a fowl
266. I cut a tree
267. I flog a child
268. I catch a fish
269. I break a stick
270. I call a slave
271. I cover a pot
272. I sew a shirt (cloth)
273. I pray to God (beg God)
274. I play
275. I do not play
276. I dance
277. I do not dance
278. Yesterday
279. Today
280. To-morrow

== The languages ==
As the list of languages and countries below shows, most of Koelle's languages came from West Africa. This is mainly because the majority of the slaves themselves who were intercepted by the British Navy and taken to Sierra Leone were from that region. Another factor was that the number of different languages in West Africa is greater than in some other parts of Africa. For example, Cameroon alone is said to have 255 different languages. One area missing is the Swahili coast of Kenya and Tanzania, apparently because slaves intercepted there were taken not to Sierra Leone but to Zanzibar.

Koelle's language names are given in the left-hand column of the table below: some of the diacritics (such as the dot beneath ẹ and ọ, and the acute accent) have been omitted. The groupings are Koelle's own. The larger groups are subdivided by Koelle into smaller groups, which are not shown in the table.

Names in square brackets such as [Aku] are subheadings of a group of languages, and do not themselves have any words. The number of languages or dialects represented on each double-page spread of Koelle's book is therefore exactly 200, divided into four columns of 50 languages each.

Koelle's Name	Modern Name	Country
I. North-West Atlantic		
Fulup	Dyola (Huluf)	Senegal
Fīlham	Dyola (Filham)	Senegal
Bōla	Mankanya (Bulama)	Senegal
Sarār	Mankanya (Sadar)	Senegal
Pepēl	Pepel, Papel	Guinea-Bissau
Kanyōp	Mandyak / Manjak / Kanyop	Guinea-Bissau, Senegal
Biāfada	Biafada / Bidyola	Guinea-Bissau
Padṣāde	Badyar, Badyara / Padjade	Guinea, Guinea-Bissau
Baga	Baga (Koba)	Guinea
Timne	Temne (Western)	Sierra Leone
Bulom	Bullom (Kafu)	Sierra Leone
Mampa	Bullom (Sherbro)	Sierra Leone
Kisi	Kissi	Guinea, Sierra Leone, Liberia
II. North-western High Sudan or Mandenga		
Mandenga	Mandinka	The Gambia, Senegal, Guinea-Bissau, Guinea
Kābunga	Mandinka (Sidyanka?)	Guinea-Bissau
Toronka	Mandinka (Toronka)	Guinea
Dṣalunka	Mandinka (Futa Jallon)	Guinea
Kankanka	Mandinka (Kankanka)	Guinea
Bambara	Bambara	Mali
Vei	Vai	Liberia, Sierra Leone
Kono	Kono	Sierra Leone
Soso	Susu-Yalunka ?	Sierra Leone
Sōlīma	Yalunka (Sulima)?	Sierra Leone
Kisekise	Susu dial.	Guinea
Tēne	Susu dial.	Guinea
Gbandi	Bandi	Sierra Leone, Liberia
Landōṛo	Loko (Landogo)	Sierra Leone
Mende	Mende	Sierra Leone
Gbese	Kpelle / Gerze	Guinea, Liberia
Tōma	Loma / Toma / Buzi	Guinea, Liberia
Mano	Manon / Mano / Ma	Liberia
Gīo	Dan / Gio	Liberia
III. Upper Guinea or Middle Coast		
Dēwoi	De / Dewoi	Liberia
Basa	Bassa (of Liberia)	Liberia
Kra	Kra / Kru	Liberia
Krēbo	Grebo	Liberia
Gbē	Ge or Sikon	Liberia
Adampe	Ewe-Fon (Ewe dial.)	Ghana
An˙fūe	Ewe-Fon (Aja)	Benin
Hwida	Ewe-Fon (Hweda)	Benin
Dahōme	Ewe-Fon (Fon)	Benin
Māḥi	Ewe-Fon (Maxi)	Benin
[Akū]	Yoruba	Nigeria
Ota	Yoruba (Egbado)	Nigeria
Egba	Yoruba (Egba)	Nigeria
Īdṣeṣa	Yoruba (Ijesha)	Nigeria
Yorūba	Yoruba (Oyo)	Nigeria
Yāgba	Yoruba (Yagba)	Nigeria
Ekī	Yoruba (Bunu)	Nigeria
Dṣumu	Yoruba (Jumu)	Nigeria
Oworo	Yoruba (Aworo)	Nigeria
Dṣebu	Yoruba (Ijebu)	Nigeria
Īfe	Yoruba (Ife)	Nigeria
Ondō	Yoruba (Ondo)	Nigeria
Dṣēkiri	Yoruba (Jekri)	Nigeria
Igala	Igala	Nigeria
IV. North-Eastern High Sudan		
Mōse	More (Mossi)	Burkina Faso
Dṣelan˙a	Yom	Benin
Gurēṣa	Buli	Ghana
Gurma	Gurma	Burkina Faso, Togo, Benin, Niger
Lēgba	Logba	Ghana
Kaure	Kabre, Kabiye	Togo
Kīamba	Tem	Togo
Koāma	Sisala, Sisaala?	Ghana, Burkina Faso
Bagbalan˙	Sisala, Sisaala?	Ghana, Burkina Faso
Kasm	Kasem, Kassena	Ghana, Burkina Faso
Yūla	Kasem	Ghana, Burkina Faso
V. Niger-Delta		
Īsoāma	Igbo (Isu-Ama)	Nigeria
Iṣiēle	Igbo (Ishielu)	Nigeria
Abādṣa	Igbo (Abaja)	Nigeria
Āro	Igbo (Aro)	Nigeria
Mbofīa	Igbo (Mbofia)	Nigeria
Sōbo	Urhobo / Sobo	Nigeria
Egbēle	Kukuruku	Nigeria
Bini	Edo / Bini	Nigeria
Īhewe	Ishan / Esan	Nigeria
Olōma	Kukuruku dial.	Nigeria
Okulōma	Ijaw (Kolokuma)	Nigeria
Ūdṣo	Ijaw (Western)	Nigeria
VI. Niger-Dschadda		
Nūpe	Nupe	Nigeria
Kupa	Kupa	Nigeria
Eṣitāko	Dibo / Zitako	Nigeria
Musu	Gbari / Gwari	Nigeria
[Goāli]	Gbari / Gwari	Nigeria
Gūgu	Gbari / Gwari	Nigeria
‘Puka	Gbari / Gwari	Nigeria
Basa	Bassa-Nge ?	Nigeria
Ebē	Ebe / Asu	Nigeria
Opanda	Ebira / Igbirra (Panda)	Nigeria
Īgu	Ebira / Igbirra (Igu)	Nigeria
Egbīra-Hīma	Ebira / Igbirra (Hima)	Nigeria
VII. Central African		
Budūma	Yedina / Buduma	Chad, Cameroon, Nigeria
[Bornu]	Kanuri	Nigeria
Kānurī	Kanuri (Kagama)	Nigeria
Muniō	Kanuri (Manga)	Nigeria, Niger
Ngurū	Kanuri (Nguru)	Nigeria
Kānem	Kanuri (Kanem)	Chad
Pīka	Bole / Bolewa / Fika	Nigeria
Karēkare	Karekare	Nigeria
Bode	Bade ?	Nigeria
Ngōdṣin	Ngizim ?	Nigeria
Dōai	Bade ?	Nigeria
VIII. Atam		
Ekamtulūfu	Nde	Nigeria
Ūdom	Nde	Nigeria
Mbofōn	Nde	Nigeria
Ēafen˙	Ekoi	Nigeria, Cameroon
Basa	Bassa-Kaduna (Kontagora?)	Nigeria
Kāmuku	Kamuku (Ucinda?)	Nigeria
Dṣuku	Jukun	Nigeria
Erēgba	‘Eregba’	Nigeria
IX. Mokō		
Isūwu	Suwu / Su	Cameroon
Diwala	Duala	Cameroon
Ōrungu	Myene, Rongo	Gabon
Bāyon˙	? Limbum, Kwaja, Mbə	Cameroon
Pāti	? Limbum, Kwaja, Mbə	Cameroon
Kum	Kako	Cameroon
Bāgba	Bati?	Cameroon
Bālu	Baba'	Cameroon
Bāmom	Bamum / Shu Paməm	Cameroon
Ngoāla	Bangolan	Cameroon
Mōmenya	Menyam, Bamenyam	Cameroon
Pāpīaḥ	Baba	Cameroon
Pāṛam	Məngaka	Cameroon
Ngoten	Eastern Manenguba	Cameroon
Melon˙	Eastern Manenguba	Cameroon
N˙hālemōe	Western Manenguba	Cameroon
Bāseke	Seki / Sekiyani	Equatorial Guinea, Gabon
X. Congo-Ngōla		
Kabenda	Kakongo / Kikongo	DR Congo
Mimboma	Central Kongo	DR Congo
Musentāndu	N.E. Kongo / Kintandu	DR Congo
Mbāmba	North Teke	DR Congo, Gabon
Kanyīka	Kanyok / Kanyoka	DR Congo
Nteṛe	Tsaayi	DR Congo, Gabon
Mutsāya	Laali	DR Congo, Gabon
Babuma	Boõ	Republic of the Congo, DR Congo
Būmbete	Mbete	Republic of the Congo, Gabon
Kasāndṣ	Mbangala	Angola
Nyombe	Yombe	Republic of the Congo, DR Congo
Basūnde	Suundi	Republic of the Congo
Ngōla	Kimbundu	Angola
Pangēla	Umbundu	Angola
Lubalo	Bolo	Angola
Rūnda	Ruund	DR Congo, Angola
Sōngo	Nsongo / Songo	Angola
Kisāma	Sama	Angola
XI. South-Eastern		
Mūntu	Yao	Malawi, Mozambique
Kirīman	Cuabo, Chuwabo, Chuwabu	Mozambique
Marāwi	Nyanja (Chichewa)	Malawi, Mozambique
Mēto	Makua	Mozambique
Mātatān	Makua	Mozambique
Nyambān	Tonga (S62)	Mozambique
XII. Unclassified and Isolated		
Wolof	Wolof	Senegal, Gambia, Mauretania
[Bidṣōgo]	Bidyogo (Bijago)	Guinea-Bissau
Ankāras	Bidyogo (Bijago)	Guinea-Bissau
Wūn	Bidyogo (Bijago)	Guinea-Bissau
Gadṣāga	Soninke / Gadyaga	Mali, Senegal
Gura	Gola	Liberia
Banyūn	Banyun / Bagnun /Banyum	Senegal, Guinea-Bissau
Nalu	Nalu	Guinea, Guinea-Bissau
Bulanda	Balant (Balanta)	Guinea-Bissau, The Gambia
Limba	Limba (Sella)	Sierra Leone, Guinea
Landōma	Landoma	Guinea
Asante	Twi (Asante)	Ghana
Barba	Bargu / Bariba	Benin
Boko	Busa (Boko) ?	Nigeria
Kandin	Tamashek, Tamasheq (Tuareg)	Algeria, Mali, Niger, Burkina Faso
Tumbuktu	Songhai	Mali
Mandara	Mandara, Wandala	Cameroon, Nigeria
Bāgrmi	Bagirmi	Chad
[Housa]	Hausa	Niger, Northern Nigeria
Kano	Hausa (Kananci)	Nigeria
Kadzīna	Hausa (Katsinanci)	Nigeria
[Pulō]	Fula, Fulani, Fulde	Senegal, Guinea, Nigeria
Timbō	Fula (Futa Jallon)	Guinea
Sālum	Fula (Senegal)	Senegal
Gōbūru	Fula (Gobir / Sokoto)	Nigeria
Kano	Fula (Kano)	Nigeria
Yala	Idoma (Yala)	Nigeria
Anān˙	Ibibio-Efik (Anang)	Nigeria
Dṣāwāra	Jarawa / Jar	Nigeria
Koro	Koro	Nigeria
Hām	Jaba / Ham (Hyam)	Nigeria
Akurākura	agwaGwune / Akunakuna	Nigeria, Cameroon
Okām	Mbembe (Wakande)	Nigeria
Yasgūa	Yeskwa (Nyankpa)	Nigeria
N˙kī	Boki / Nki / Bokyi	Nigeria
Kambāli	Kambari	Nigeria
Alege	Alege	Nigeria
Penin	Mandi	Cameroon
Bute	Vute / Wute / Bute	Cameroon, Gabon
Murūndo	Lundu, Oroko	Cameroon
Undāza	Kota	Gabon
Ndob	Tikar, Ndop	Cameroon
Tumu	Tikar, Twumwu	Cameroon
N˙kele	Kele (Ngom?)	Gabon
Kongūan˙	Banyangi, Kenyang	Cameroon
Mbarīke	Kutev / Mbarike / Kuteb	Nigeria
Tiwi	Tiv	Nigeria
Borītsu	Boritsu / Yukuben	Nigeria
Āfudu	Afudu (a dialect of Tangale)	Nigeria
Mfūt	Kaalong	Cameroon
Mbē	Bakongwang	Cameroon
Nṣo	Nso, Nsaw	Cameroon
[Arabic]	Arabic	
Ṣōa	Arabic (Shuwa)	Chad
Wadai	Arabic	Chad
Ādirar	Arabic	Mali
Bēṛān	Arabic	Mali

== Bibliography ==
- Arnott, D. W. (1965). "Fula Dialects in the Polyglotta Africana". Sierra Leone Language Review, 4, 1965, pp. 109–121.
- Blench, Roger (draft). The Bantoid Languages.
- Blench, Roger; Hamm, Cameron (draft). "The Nun Languages of the Grassfields of Cameroun".
- Clarke, John (1848/9). Specimens Of Dialects, Short Vocabularies Of Languages: And Notes Of Countries And Customs In Africa.
- Curtin, Philip D. (1969). The Atlantic Slave Trade: A Census. University of Wisconsin.
- Curtin, Philip D.; Vansina, Jan (1964). "Sources of the Nineteenth Century Atlantic Slave Trade" The Journal of African History, Vol. 5, No. 2 (1964), pp. 185–208.
- Dalby, D. (1964). "Provisional identification of languages in the Polyglotta Africana", Sierra Leone Language Review (1964), 3, pp. 83–90.
- Dalby, David (1965). "Mel Languages in the Polyglotta Africana (Part I)". Sierra Leone Language Review 4, 1965, pp. 129–135.
- Dalby, David (1966). "Mel Languages in the Polyglotta Africana (Part II)". Sierra Leone Language Review 5, 1966, pp. 139–.
- Doneux, J. L. (1969). "Studies devoted to S. W. Koelle's Polyglotta Africana: Le Gio". African Languages Review, vol. 8, 1969, pp. 263–271.
- Green, Margaret M. (1967). "Igbo Dialects in the Polyglotta Africana". African Language Review 6, pp. 111–119.
- Greenberg, Joseph (1966). "Polyglotta Evidence for Consonant Mutation in the Mandyak Languages." Sierra Leone Language Review 5, 1966, pp. 116–110.
- Guthrie, Malcolm (1964). "Bantu Languages in the Polyglotta Africana". Sierra Leone Language Review 3, pp. 59-64.
- Hair, P. E. H. (1963). "Koelle at Freetown: An Historical Introduction”, in Koelle, (1963 [1854a]), Polyglotta Africana, ed. P. E. H. Hair. Graz, pp. 7–17.
- Hair, P. E. H. (1965). "The Enslavement of Koelle's Informants". The Journal of African History, Vol. 6, No. 2 (1965), pp. 193–203.
- Hair, P. E. H. (1966a). "Collections of Vocabularies of Western Africa before the Polyglotta: A Key". Journal of African Languages, 1966, pp. 208–17.
- Hair, P. E. H. (1966b). "An Introduction to John Clarke's "Specimens of Dialects" 1848/9.". Sierra Leone Language Review, 5, 1966, pp. 72–82.
- Hedinger, Robert (1984), A Comparative-Historical Study of the Manenguba languages (Bantu A.15, Mbo Cluster) of Cameroon. University of London PhD thesis.
- Houis, Maurice (1966). "Review: (Untitled). Reviewed Work: Polyglotta Africana by Sigismund Wilhelm Koelle." L'Homme. T. 6, No. 1 (Jan. - Mar., 1966), pp. 136–139. (in French)
- Innes, Gordon (1967). "Mende 1n the Polyglotta Africana". African Language Review 6, pp. 120–127.
- Koelle, S.W. (1854.) Polyglotta Africana, or a comparative vocabulary of nearly three hundred words and phrases, in more than one hundred distinct African languages. 188 pp. London, Church Missionary House.
- Köhler, Oswin (1964). "Gur Languages in the Polyglotta Africana". Sierra Leone Language Review 3, 1964, pp. 65–73.
- Kropp, Mary Esther (1966). "The Adampe and Anfue Dialects of Ewe in the Polyglotta Africana." Sierra Leone Language Review 5, 1966, pp. 116–121.
- Lacroix, P. F. (1967). "Le Vocabulaire «Kandin» dans la Polyglotta Africana". African Language Review 6, pp. 153–158.
- Laver, John (1969). "Studies devoted to S. W. Koelle's Polyglotta Africana: Etsako". African Languages Review, vol. 8, 1969, pp. 257–262.
- Prost, A. (1966). "La langue Gurma dans la Polyglotta Africana." Sierra Leone Language Review 5, 1966, pp. 134–138.
- Prost, A. (1969). "Studies devoted to S. W. Koelle's Polyglotta Africana: La langue de Tumbuktu". African Languages Review, vol. 8, 1969, pp. 272–278.
- Pugach, Sara (2006). "Koelle, Sigismund Wilhelm (1823–1902)".
- Rowlands, E. C. (1965). "Yoruba Dialects in the Polyglotta Africana". Sierra Leone Language Review, 4. 1965, pp. 103–108.
- Solleveld, Floris (2020). "Language Gathering and Philological Expertise: Sigismund Koelle, Wilhelm Bleek, and the Languages of Africa". Les Linguistes allemands du XIXème siècle et leurs interlocuteurs étrangers. pp. 169–200.
- Spencer, John (1966). "S. W. Koelle and the Problem of Notation for African Languages, 1847-1855". Sierra Leone Language Review 5, pp. 83–105.
- Stewart, John M. (1966). "Asante Twi in the Polyglotta Africana." Sierra Leone Language Review 5, 1966, pp. 111–115.
- Williamson, Kay (1966). "Ijo Dialects in the Polyglotta Africana." Sierra Leone Language Review 5, 1966, pp. 122–133.
- Winston, F. D. D. (1964). "Nigerian Cross River Languages in the Polyglotta Africana: Part 1". Sierra Leone Language Review, 3, 1964, pp. 74–82.
- Winston, F. D. D. (1965). "Nigerian Cross River Languages in the Polyglotta Africana: Part 2". Sierra Leone Language Review, 4, 1965, pp. 122–128.
- Zwernemann, Jürgen (1967). "Kasem Dialects in the Polyglotta Africana". African Language Review 6, pp. 128–152.
