= Gupa-Abawa language =

Nupoid language of Niger State, Nigeria

Gupa-Abawa
- Native to: Nigeria
- Region: Niger State
- Native speakers: (15,000 cited 1989)
- Language family: Niger–Congo?: Atlantic–Congo; Volta–Niger; noi; Nupoid; Nupe–Gbagyi; Nupe languages; Core Nupe; Gupa cluster; Gupa-Abawa

Language codes
- ISO 639-3: gpa
- Glottolog: gupa1248

Gupa-Abawa is a Nupoid language spoken in Niger State, Nigeria. It is named after its two ethnicities, Gupa and Abawa.

Gupa is spoken in the villages of Gupa, Abugi-Jankara, Emirokpa, Favu, Kenigi, Kpotagi, Abete, Kuba, Avu, Dagbaje, Eji, Jihun, Yelwa, Cheku, Atsuchepa, Alaba, Gbedu, and Kirikpo located to the south of Lapai. Lexically, it is most closely related to Kami and Dibo.
