= Nupoid languages =

Branch of volta-Niger African language

Nupoid
- Geographic distribution: Central Nigeria; along the Niger River from the confluence of the Benue and north
- Linguistic classification: Niger–Congo?: Atlantic–Congo; Volta–Niger; noi; Nupoid
- Subdivisions: Ebira–Gade; Nupe–Gbagyi

Language codes
- Glottolog: nupo1239

The Nupoid languages are a branch of Volta–Niger spoken in west-central Nigeria, particularly in southeastern Niger State and northern Kogi State. They include the Nupe, and Ebira languages, each with about 4 million speakers. Most Nupoid languages have 3 level tones.

== Languages ==
Roger Blench (2013: 4) classifies the Nupoid languages as follows.

- Nupoid
  - Ebira–Gade
    - Ebira
    - Gade
  - Nupe–Gbagyi
    - Gwari (Gbagyi, Gbari)
    - Nupe
      - Asu
      - Core Nupe
        - Nupe cluster
          - Nupe (Nupe–Nupe-Tako)
          - Dibo
        - Gupa cluster
          - Gupa-Abawa
          - Kakanda
          - Kami
          - Kupa

In addition, Koro Zuba is close to Dibo.

== Names and locations ==
Below is a list of language names, populations, and locations from Blench (2019).

Language	Cluster	Dialects	Alternate spellings	Own name for language	Endonym(s)	Other names (location-based)	Other names for language	Exonym(s)	Speakers	Location(s)
Dibo				Dibo	Dibo		Shitako, Zitako, Zhitako	Ganagawa, Ganagana	4 18,200 (1931 DF); estimate more than 100,000 (1990) – an unknown number of Dibo living among the Gbari no longer speak their own language.	Niger State, Lapai LGA; Federal Capital Territory; Nasarawa State, Nasarawa LGA
Nupe–Nupe Tako cluster	Nupe–Nupe Tako	Central Nupe has become the accepted literary form.					BassaNge		360,000 (1952); 1,000,000 (1987 UBS) may include closely related languages	Niger State, Lavun, Mariga, Gbako, Agaie, and Lapai LGAs; Kwara State, Edu and Kogi LGAs; Federal Capital Territory; Kogi State, Bassa LGA. Lokoja
Nupe (Central)	Nupe–Nupe Tako		Nife, Nyffe, Anupe	Nupe	Nupe	Nupe Central	Ampeyi, Anupecwayi, Anuperi, Tappah, Takpa, Tapa, Nupenci, Nupencizi	Anufawa, Nyffe	283,000 (1931 DF); estimated 1,000,000 (2000)	
Nupe Tako	Nupe–Nupe Tako						Ibara	Basa Nge	19,100 (1931 DF)	Kogi State, Bassa LGA, Kwara State
Gade			Gede	Gade	Gade				60,000 (Sterk 1977)	Federal Capital Territory; Nasarawa State, Nasarawa LGA
Ebira cluster	Ebira		Igbirra, Igbira, Egbira, Egbura						154,500 (1952 P.Bruns), 500,000 (1980 UBS); about 1M (1989 Adive)	Kwara State, Okene, Okehi, and Kogi LGAs; Nasarawa State, Nasarawa LGA; Edo State, Akoko–Edo LGA
Okene	Ebira									Kwara State, Okene, Okehi, and Kogi LGAs
Etuno	Ebira		tụnọ					Igara		Edo State, Akoko–Edo LGA, Igara town
Koto	Ebira							Igu (Egu, Ika, Bira, Birĩ, Panda		FCT Abuja, Abaji AAC,Nasarawa State, Nasarawa LGA, Toto LGA and Umasha/Opanda towns, Kogi State, Koton Karfe LGA
Gbagyi		A spread of lects not clearly defined but the variation represented here by town names: Vwezhi, Ngenge (Genge, Gyange), or Tawari, Kuta, Diko, Karu, Louome, Kaduna			Ibagyi, Gbagye	East Gwari, Gwari Matai	Gwari		200,000 (1952 G&C) including Gbari; 250,000 (1985 UBS)	Niger State, Rafi, Chanchaga, Shiroro and Suleija LGAs; Federal Capital Territory; Kaduna State, Kachia LGA; Nasarawa State, Keffi and Nasarawa LGAs
Gbagyi Nkwa				Gbagyi	Gbagyi				more than 50,000 (1989 est.)	Niger State, Rafi LGA
Gbari		A spread of lects are named according to town names: Botai, Jezhu, Konge, Kwange (Agbawi, Wake, Wĩ Wahe, or Kwali, Paiko, Izom, Gayegi, Yamma (Gwari Gamma); other lects are also based on river locations: Shigokpna, Zubakpna, Abokpna, Sumwakpna				Gwari Yamma, West Gwari			200,000 (1952 G&C) including Gbagyi	Niger State, Chanchaga, Suleija, Agaie and Lapai LGAs; Federal Capital Territory; Kaduna State, Kachia LGA; Nasarawa State, Nasarawa LGA
Gupa–Abawa		Gupa, Abawa							estimated more than 10,000 Gupa and 5,000 Abawa (1989)	Niger State, Lapai LGA around Gupa and Edzu villages
Kami									more than 5000 (Blench 1989 est.)	Niger State, Lapai LGA, Ebo town & 11 villages
Asu				Asu	Asu	Abewa	Ebe		5000 (Blench 1987)	Niger State: Mariga LGA: several villages south of Kontagora on the Mokwa road
Kakanda	Kakanda	Kakanda–Budon, Kakanda–Gbanmi/Sokun	Akanda				Hyabe, Adyaktye		4,500 (1931); 20,000 (1989 Blench)	Kwara State, Kogi LGA; Niger State, Agaie and Lapai LGAs; communities along the Niger centered on Bida)
Kupa										Kwara State, Kogi LGA, around Abugi (52 villages)

== Reconstructions ==
The following Proto-Nupoid reconstructions are from Blench (2013).

Gloss	Proto-Nupoid
tree	*ɔ́ʧĩ́
leaf	#avini
charcoal	*ekana
sand	*mu-ʒin
smoke	*àmʷú
fire	*n-ra
wind	*efè
rain	*ègbã
to sharpen	*rɛ́
elephant	*-dogba
buffalo	*ɛ̀ya; *ʊ̀-fá (?)
Dioscorea guineensis	*iti
Colocasia esculenta (cocoyam)	*-koko
Sorghum bicolor (guinea corn, sorghum)	*àkwʊ́
one	*ɔ̀ɲɪ
three	*ɛ̀tá
four	*ɛ̀ɲi
five	*ɛ̀tsun
six	*twaɲi
seven	*ǹtwaba
ten	*ɛ̀bwʊ́n

Some Proto-Nupe-Gbari crop name reconstructions are (Blench 2013):

Gloss	Proto-Nupe-Gbari
Pennisetum americanum (long-season millet)	*màkwú
Pennisetum americanum (short-season millet)	*sàkwú; *kpàyì
Digitaria exilis	*-furu
