= North West (Nigeria) =

- Interactive map of North West
- Coordinates: 11°N 7°E
- Country: Nigeria
- States: Jigawa State; Kaduna State; Kano State; Katsina State; Kebbi State; Sokoto State; Zamfara State
- Largest city: Kano
- Major cities: Kaduna; Zaria; Sokoto; Katsina; Gusau; Garki; Funtua

Area
  - Total: 216,065 km^{2} (83,423 sq mi)

Population (2006)
  - Total: 35,915,467
  - Estimate (2022): 60,150,400
  - Density: 166/km^{2} (430/sq mi)
- Time zone: UTC+1 (WAT)
- Languages: Adara; Arabic; Bade; Boko; Fulfulde; Gbagyi; Hausa; Hyam; Igbo; Kanuri; Nghan; English; Nigerian Sign Language; Nupe; Tawellemmet; Tyap; Yoruba; Zarma

The six geopolitical zones of Nigeria.

The North West (often hyphenated to the North-West) is one of the six geopolitical zones of Nigeria representing both a geographic and political region of the country's northwest. It comprises seven states – Jigawa, Kaduna, Kano, Katsina, Kebbi, Sokoto, and Zamfara.

Geographically, the zone is almost entirely within the tropical West Sudanian savanna ecoregion. Culturally, the majority of the zone falls within Hausaland–the indigenous cultural homeland of the Hausa people, a group which makes up the largest ethnic percentage of the northwestern population; however, there are sizable minorities of Fulani people and other groups, mainly on the zone's peripheries.

Economically, the North West's urban areas–like the city of Kano–are large boosts to the Nigerian economy while most rural areas lag behind due to insecurity, low education rates, and government neglect. The region has a population of about 49 million people, around 23% of the total population of the country. Kano is the most populous city in the North West as well as the second most populous city in Nigeria and the twentieth most populous city in Africa. Other large northwestern cities include (in order by population) Kaduna, Zaria, Sokoto, Katsina, Gusau, Garki, and Funtua.
