= Lokoja =

Capital city of Kogi State, Nigeria

- LGA and city
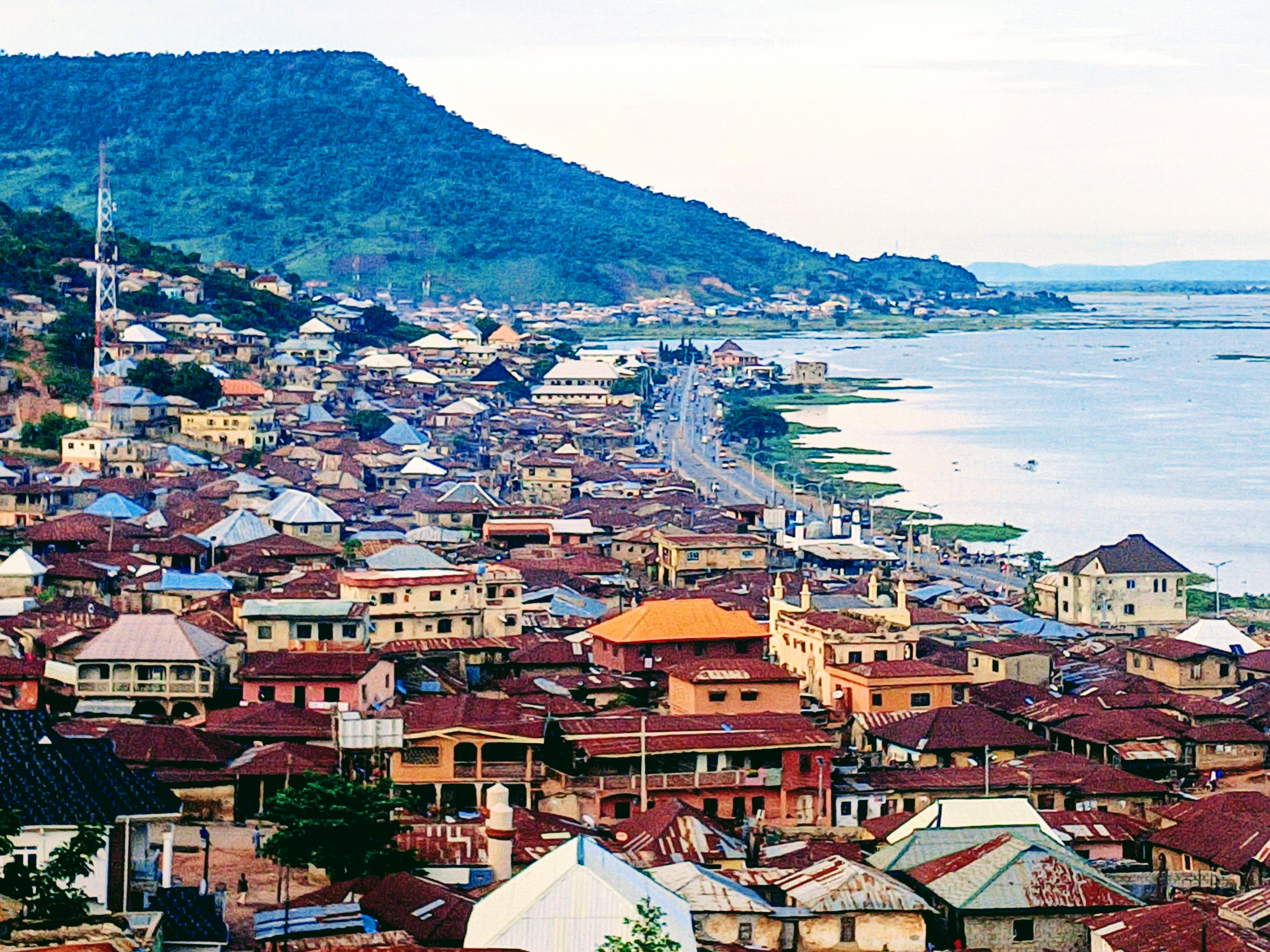
- Lokoja
- Nicknames: The Confluence Town
- Interactive map of Lokoja
- Location within Nigeria
- Coordinates: 07°48′07″N 06°44′39″E
- Country: Nigeria
- State: Kogi State

Government
  - Local government chairman: Abdullahi Adamu

Area
  - Total: 3,180 km^{2} (1,230 sq mi)

Population (2020)
  - Total: 692,050
  - Density: 218/km^{2} (564/sq mi)
- Time zone: UTC+1 (WAT)
- Climate: Aw

Lokoja is a city in central Nigeria. It lies at the confluence of the Niger and Benue rivers and is the capital city of Kogi State.

While the Bassa Nge, Yoruba (primarily the Oworo, who are a subgroup of the Yoruba) and Nupe are indigenous to the area, other ethnic groups in Nigeria, including the Kupa-Nupe, Hausa, Ebira, Igala, Igbo, Bini/Edo, and Tiv have recently established themselves. Lokoja is projected to be the third fastest growing city on the African continent between 2020 and 2025, with a 5.93% growth rate.

It was listed as a second class township by the 1917 township ordinance of the colonial administration, indicating that Lokoja is an old city. Lokoja was founded in 1857 by William Balfour Baikie, a British explorer, who established a trading post on the banks of the Niger River. The city's strategic location made it an important center for trade and commerce in the region. Lokoja is a city with a rich history, cultural significance, and economic importance. Its strategic location and natural beauty make it a popular destination for tourists and investors alike.

== Etymology ==
Different ethnic groups lay claim to having named the city.

- The Yoruba (Oworo) phrase; Ilu Oke Oja ("The market town/settlement located on the hill").
- The Hausas believe the name comes from Loko Ja ("A red corner") and that the city was named by the emir of Zazzau.
- The Nupes believe the name comes from Patti Lukongi ("The hill of doves").

== History ==
The area that would become Lokoja has been inhabited for hundreds of years by people from different ethnic groups prior to the arrival of Europeans. The migrations of these groups to the area could be in part accounted for by its nearness to the banks of the Niger and Benue rivers. Some of the first groups of people to have settled in Lokoja were the Nupe groups from Gbara near Bida, They are believed to have settled in Mount Patti, which is the settlement of the earliest inhabitants of Lokoja. The Kupa and Kakandas are said to have migrated downstream the Niger from the town of Baro and other parts of present-day Niger State to the confluence of the Niger and Benue rivers, Oworo people/Yoruba from Ile-Ife joined in later. This area eventually became a center of trade.

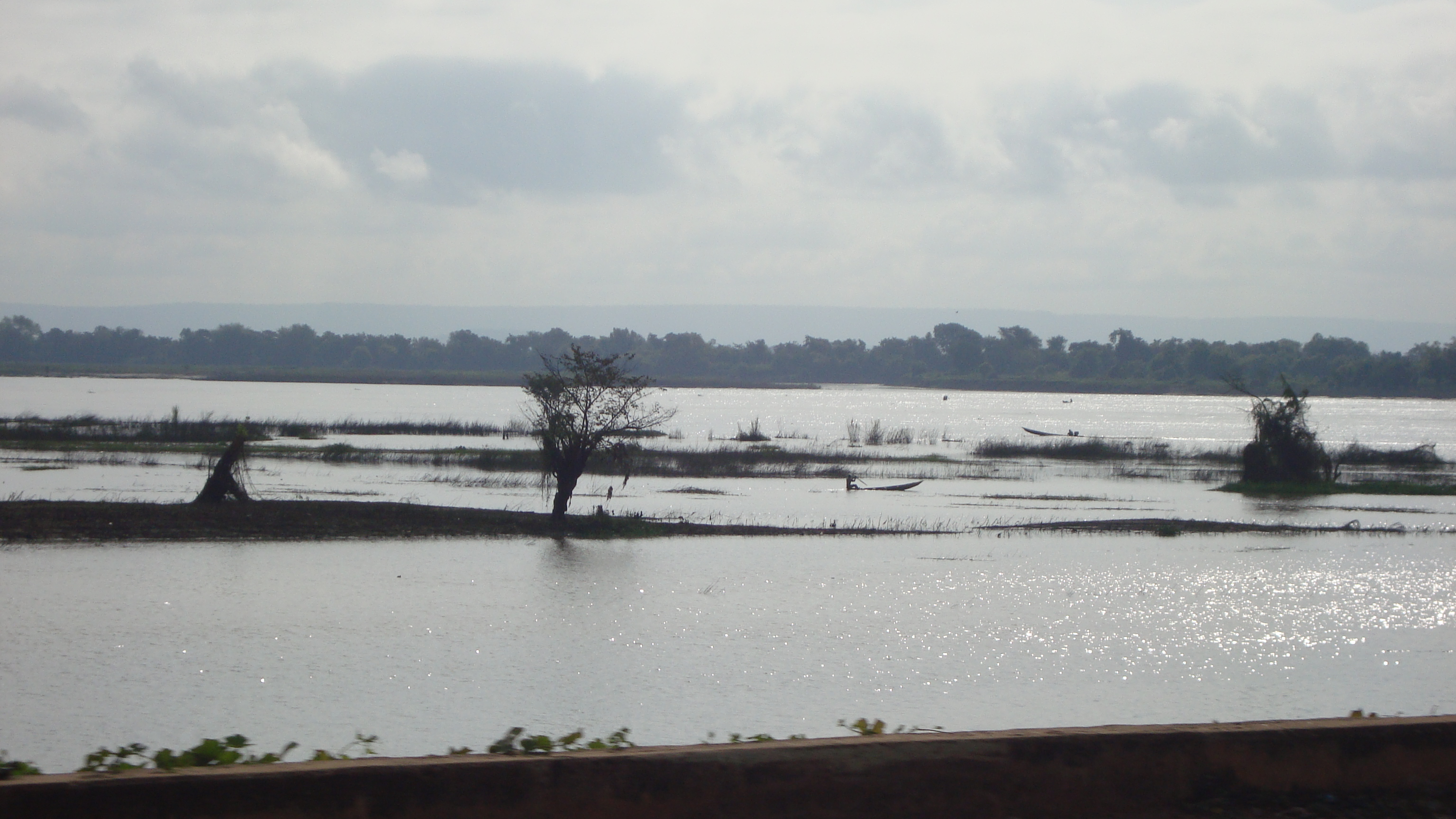
River Niger at Lokoja

The Nupe and Zazzau emirs historically appointed the Hausas as political leaders, while the Nupe filled the position of religious leader as chief imam of Lokoja. Lokoja was ruled by the following Maigari of Lokoja: Hamza, Dauda, Musa, Muhammadu Maikarfi. The British then installed a Muslim convert called Bukar (originally named Abigel), who designated his residence at Yaragi Madabo Junction of Lokoja as the new Lokoja palace. In time, the position fell to Alhaji Yahaya Muhammadu Maikarfi, and after his demise, Alhaji Kabiru, his son, succeeded him. The people sustained themselves by engaging in farming and hunting activities at Agbaja hill. Lokoja has an abundance of hills which were popular for hunting. At Mount Patti ("Patti" being the Nupe word for hill), there is a tree where the names of hunters were recorded in Ajami and Latin script. When Dr William Balfour Baikie arrived at Lokoja first in 1854 and later in 1857, he played a role in encouraging the outward movement of the people from their hilly settlements. He did this by influencing Muhammadu Maikarfi, then the Maigari of Lokoja. Muhammudu Maikarfi was then succeeded by Abigel (who converted to Islam and was renamed Bukar), who was widely seen as a stooge of the British.

The Bassa-Nges believe that they settled at the foot of Mount Patti when they came into Lokoja, before later moving again and migrating to settle across the Benue, just to the north of the Igalas. These different groups lived in different quarters of the town but were closely related socio-politically. They interacted freely and tolerated one another. Present day Lokoja is ruled by the Maigari (chief) of Lokoja, and his 12 Hakimi (Sub chiefs). Each group have their own local spheres of control: for example, the Maigari has no jurisdiction over the Olu of Oworo (whose traditional jurisdiction begins from Felele), but he does have authority over Ganaja, Kwakware, Sarkin Numa, Adankolo, ward A to ward E and other villages of Lokoja urban.

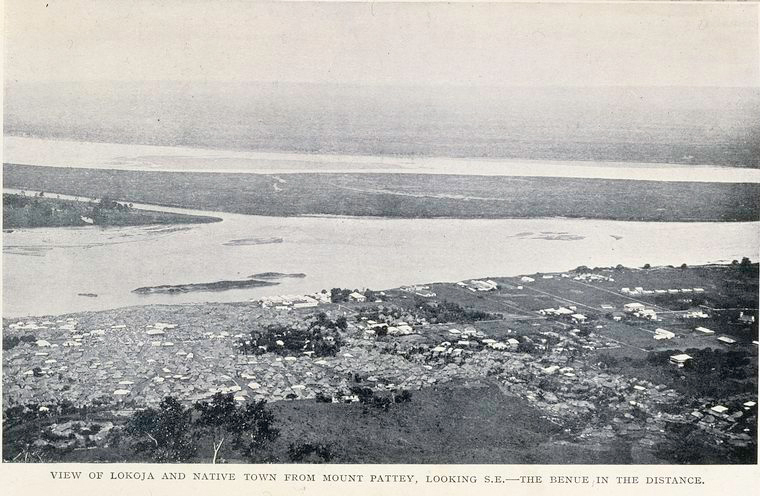
Lokoja town in 1911

The present modern settlement at Lokoja was established in 1857 by the British explorer William Baikie at the site of an earlier model farm constructed during the failed Niger expedition of 1841. Lokoja was the capital of the British Northern Nigeria Protectorate and the chief of Lokoja at that time was Alhaji Muhammadu Maikarfi. Lokoja remained a convenient administrative town for the British colonial government after the amalgamation of Northern and Southern Nigeria in 1914. The first Governor-General, Sir Frederick Lugard, governed the new nation of Nigeria from Lokoja. Other subsequent settlers into the city include the Yoruba (mainstream), the Igala, the Ebira (Ebira Tao and Igbira Koto), and the Bassa-Nge people. However, there are other groups apart from the ones mentioned above but they are classified as temporary visitors and non indigenous. These include the Igbo, Tiv, Edo, etc.

The city's population has since grown to an estimated count of over 90,000 inhabitants by 2007. It is a trade center with respect to its agricultural products; this is because it is situated at the confluence of the Niger and Benue rivers, and is close to the federal capital of Nigeria in Abuja. It is also home to Kogi State Polytechnic and the newly established Federal University Lokoja. The population of Lokoja is estimated at more than 265,000 people, as at 2022.

== Climate ==
Climate data for Lokoja (1991-2020)
Month	Jan	Feb	Mar	Apr	May	Jun	Jul	Aug	Sep	Oct	Nov	Dec	Year
Record high °C (°F)	41.2 (106.2)	42.2 (108.0)	41.5 (106.7)	41.0 (105.8)	38.3 (100.9)	39.7 (103.5)	37.2 (99.0)	36.7 (98.1)	37.2 (99.0)	37.2 (99.0)	38.0 (100.4)	41.2 (106.2)	42.2 (108.0)
Mean daily maximum °C (°F)	35.0 (95.0)	37.2 (99.0)	37.6 (99.7)	35.7 (96.3)	33.4 (92.1)	31.9 (89.4)	30.7 (87.3)	30.4 (86.7)	30.9 (87.6)	32.2 (90.0)	34.3 (93.7)	34.6 (94.3)	33.7 (92.7)
Daily mean °C (°F)	27.6 (81.7)	30.5 (86.9)	31.8 (89.2)	30.7 (87.3)	29.1 (84.4)	27.8 (82.0)	27.1 (80.8)	26.8 (80.2)	27.0 (80.6)	27.8 (82.0)	28.3 (82.9)	27.0 (80.6)	28.5 (83.3)
Mean daily minimum °C (°F)	20.3 (68.5)	23.9 (75.0)	26.1 (79.0)	25.7 (78.3)	24.7 (76.5)	23.8 (74.8)	23.4 (74.1)	23.3 (73.9)	23.2 (73.8)	23.4 (74.1)	22.3 (72.1)	19.5 (67.1)	23.3 (73.9)
Record low °C (°F)	6.1 (43.0)	12.8 (55.0)	11.1 (52.0)	16.1 (61.0)	15.0 (59.0)	12.8 (55.0)	17.2 (63.0)	17.2 (63.0)	14.4 (57.9)	15.6 (60.1)	14.0 (57.2)	10.6 (51.1)	6.1 (43.0)
Average precipitation mm (inches)	1.4 (0.06)	11.7 (0.46)	21.7 (0.85)	112.4 (4.43)	172.3 (6.78)	165.8 (6.53)	194.3 (7.65)	206.6 (8.13)	225.9 (8.89)	137.5 (5.41)	2.6 (0.10)	0.0 (0.0)	1,252.1 (49.30)
Average precipitation days (≥ 1.0 mm)	0.1	0.4	1.1	5.9	8.3	9.8	11.6	12.7	13.2	8.6	0.6	0.0	72.4
Average relative humidity (%)	51.8	54.3	62.9	71.4	78.5	82.3	84.5	85.1	85.7	83.7	71.2	57.7	72.4
Mean monthly sunshine hours	229.4	237.3	226.3	198.0	217.0	192.0	164.3	124.0	147.0	210.8	252.0	257.3	2,455.4
Mean daily sunshine hours	7.4	8.4	7.3	6.6	7.0	6.4	5.3	4.0	4.9	6.8	8.4	8.3	6.7
Source 1: NOAA
Source 2: Deutscher Wetterdienst (sun 1956-1970)

== Geography ==
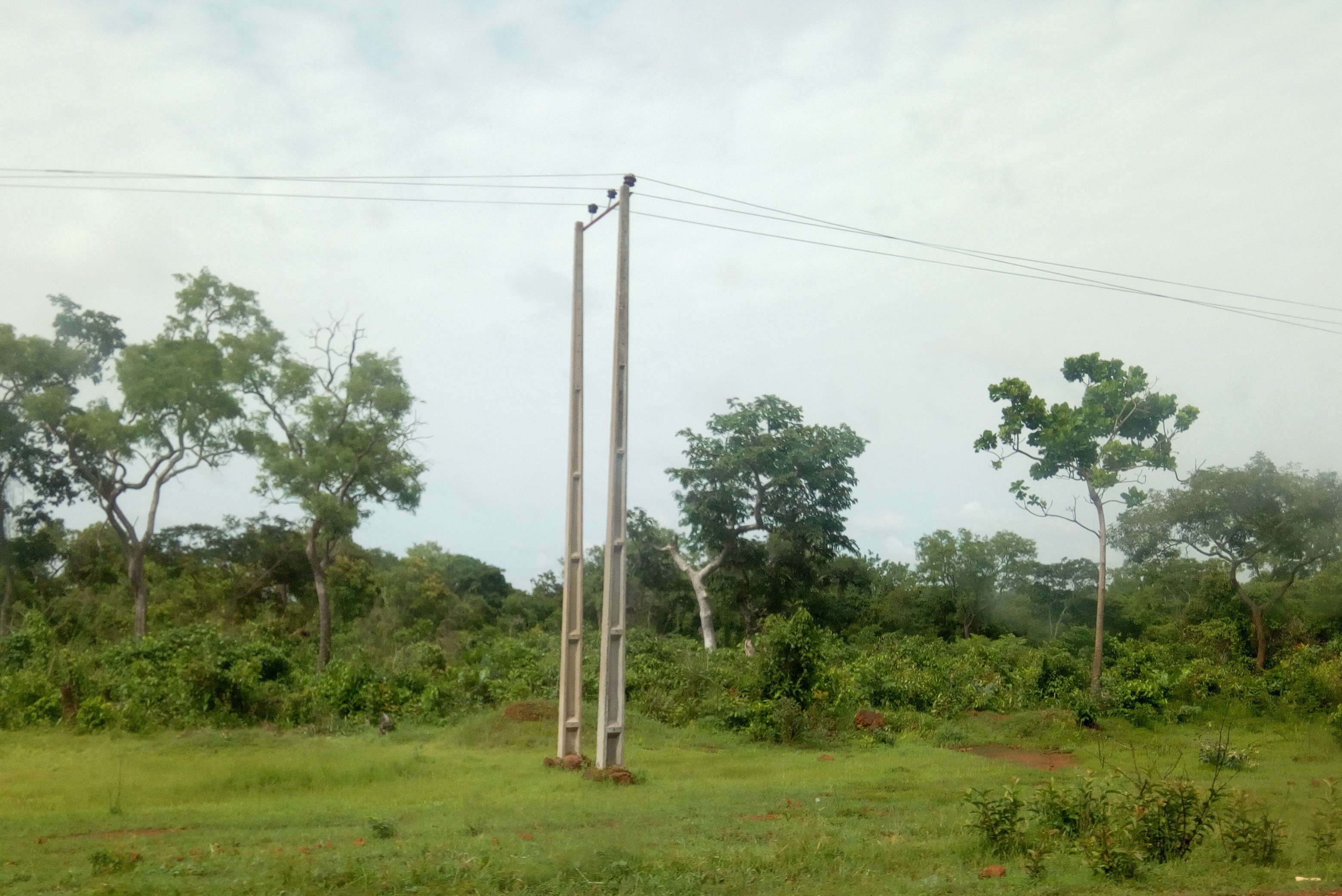
Lokoja vegetation

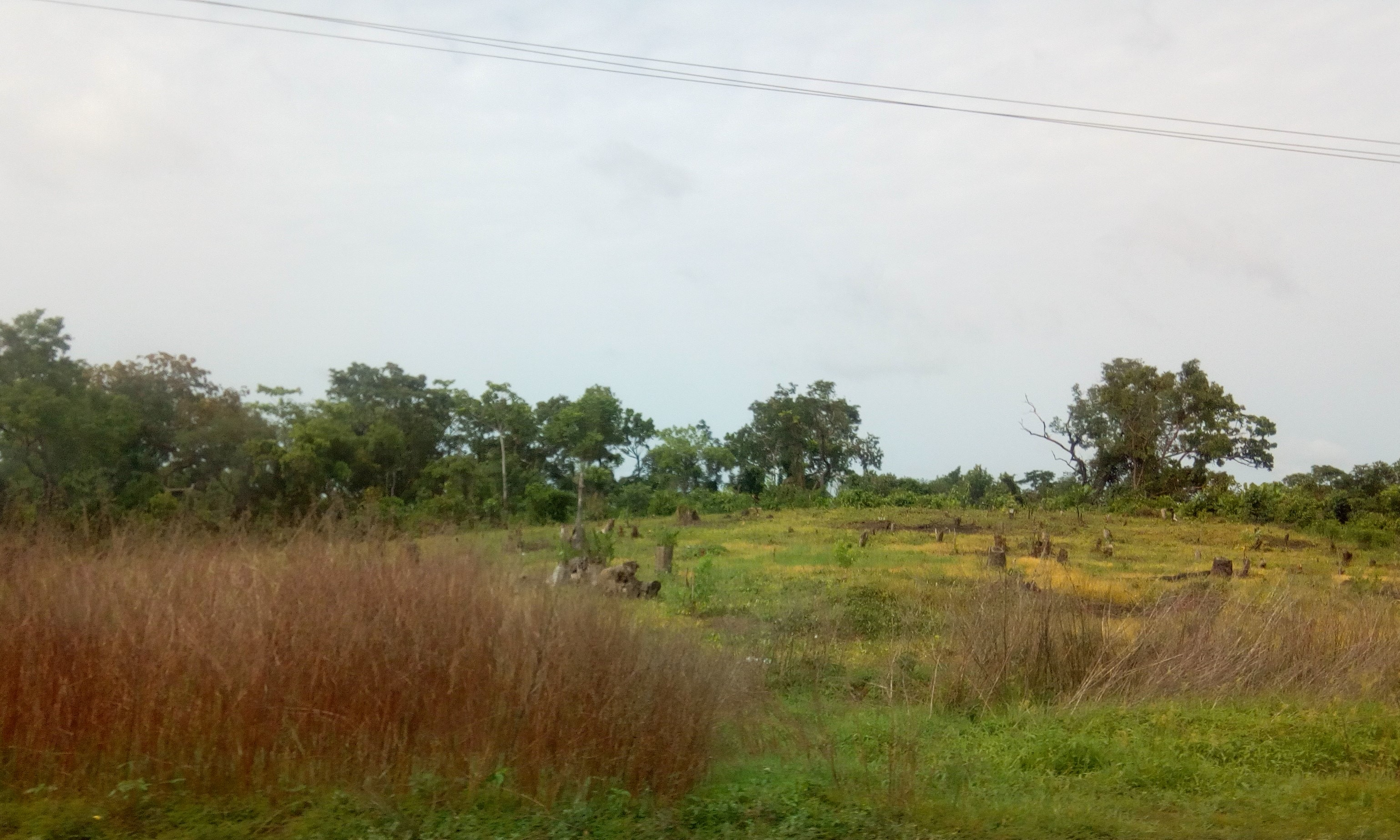
Grasses and trees in Lokoja

Lokoja lies about 7.8023° north of the equator and 6.7333° E east of the Meridian. It is about 165 km southwest of Abuja as the crow flies, and 390 km Northeast of Lagos by same measure. Residential districts are of varying density, and the city has various suburbs such as Felele, Adankolo, Otokiti and Ganaja. The town is situated in the tropical wet and dry savanna climate zone of Nigeria, and temperatures remain hot year-round. Rain begins in May and typically ends in October. Lokoja has a maximum temperature of about 37.9 °C between December and April, average annual rainfall of about 1,000 mm (3.3 ft) and average relative humidity of about 60% during the rainy season.

== Religion and culture ==
Given the multi-ethnic nature of the town, there are various festivals, events and socio-cultural activities depending on the people's group. Thus, no particular group's festivals or their socio-cultural activities can be said to be the most prominent. For instance, the Agbo masquerade festival is celebrated by the Oworo people between the months of March and April every year. Other Okuns also celebrate the Oro / Egungun festival while generally, the fishermen in Lokoja celebrate the Donkwo fishing festival and this also comes up in March/April. Editions of Lokoja boat regatta are held, though not regularly.

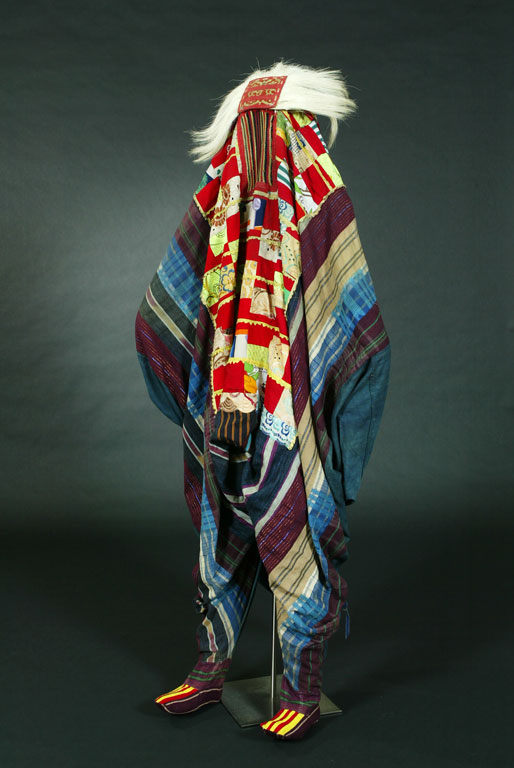
Egungun masquerade dance garment

Religiously, Islam, Christianity and traditional religion exist in Lokoja. The Muslims go to their mosques for their worship while the Christians do the same in their various churches. Religious festivals include the Muslim Eids and the Christian Christmas and Easter.

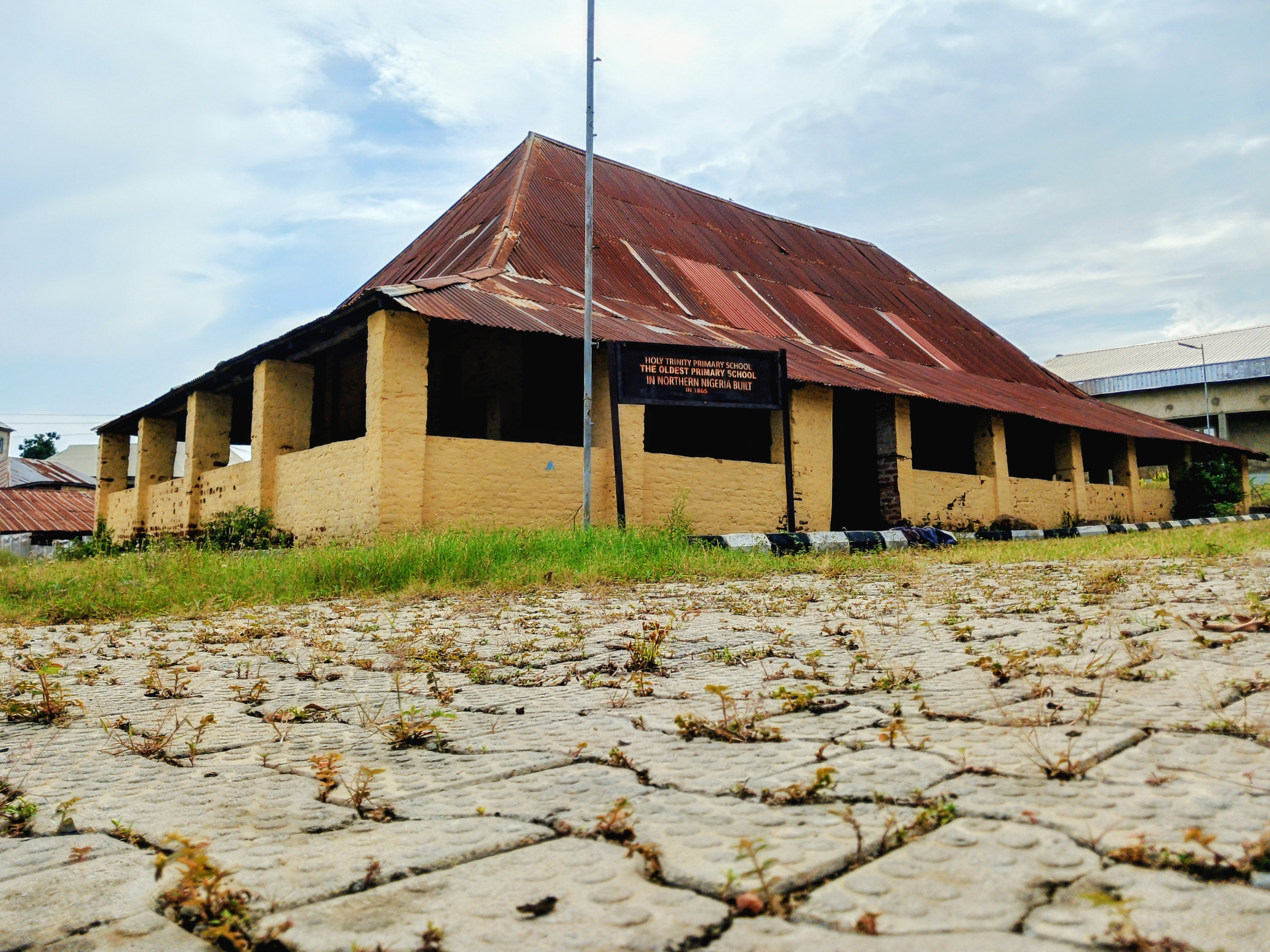
Bishop Crowther LGEA Primary School in Lokoja, regarded as the first primary school in Northern Nigeria.

=== Historical and cultural sites ===
Lokoja has several sites associated with the history of colonial administration, education, and traditional institutions in Nigeria. These sites include Iroon of Liberty, the Bishop Crowther LGEA Primary School, regarded as the first primary school in Northern Nigeria, the burial sites of the deposed Emirs in Kubuwa, the site known as the spot where the Royal Niger Company flag was lowered in 1900, Lord Lugard's rest room on Mount Patti, and relics of the early colonial prison.

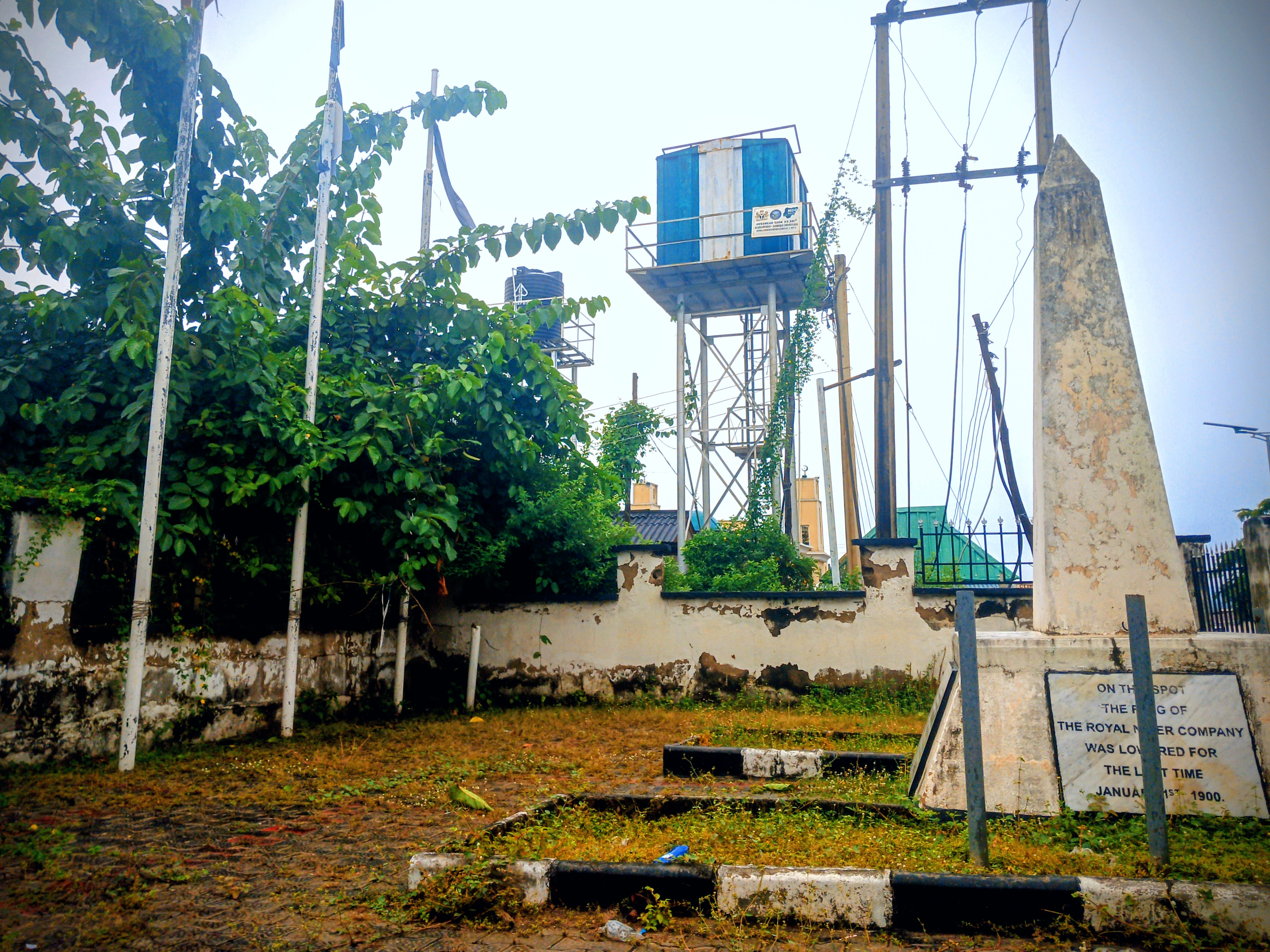
The Spot — Royal Niger Company Flag Ceremony Site, Lokoja

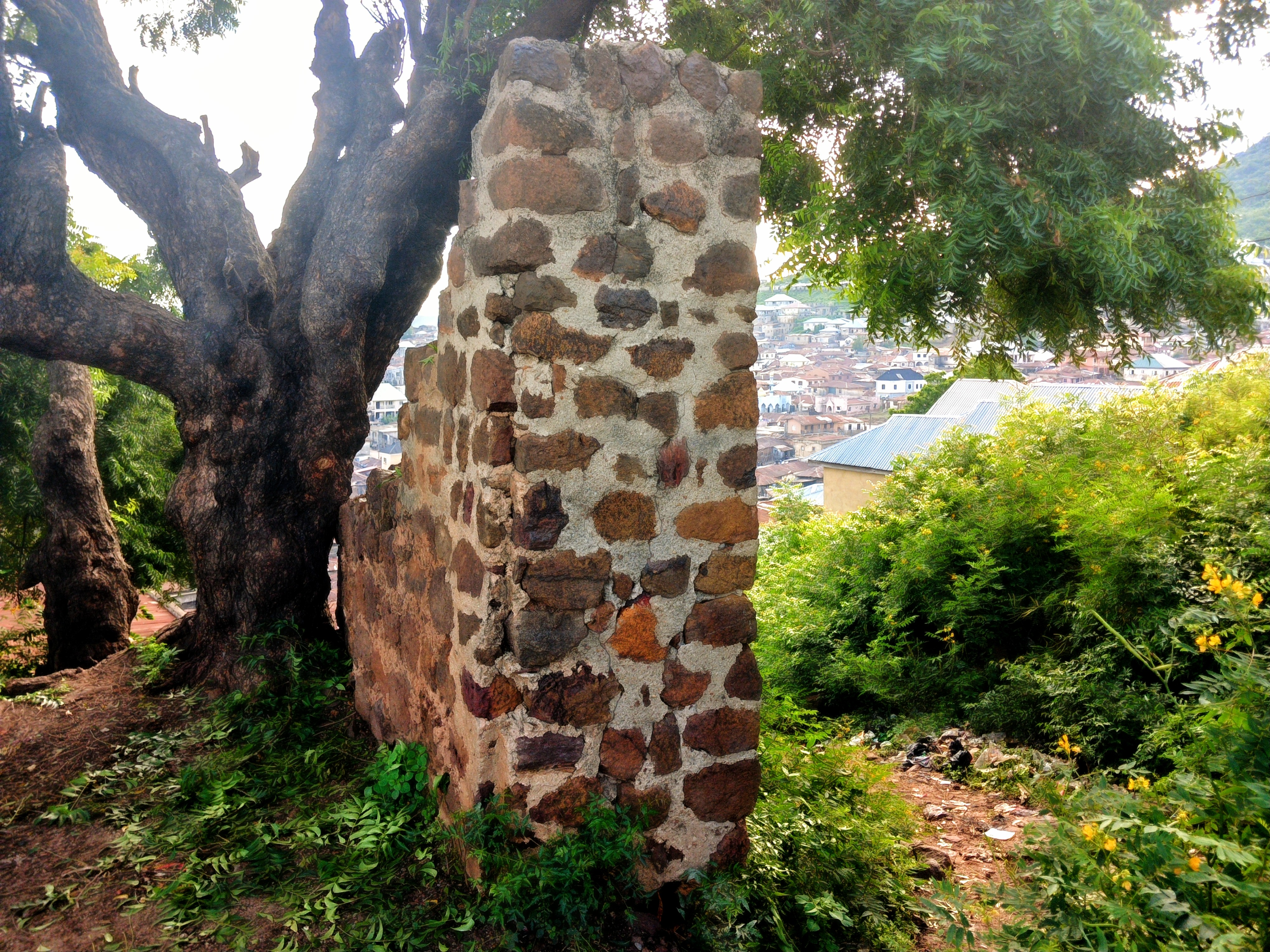
Colonial-Era Prison Relics in Lokoja, Kogi State

== Markets ==
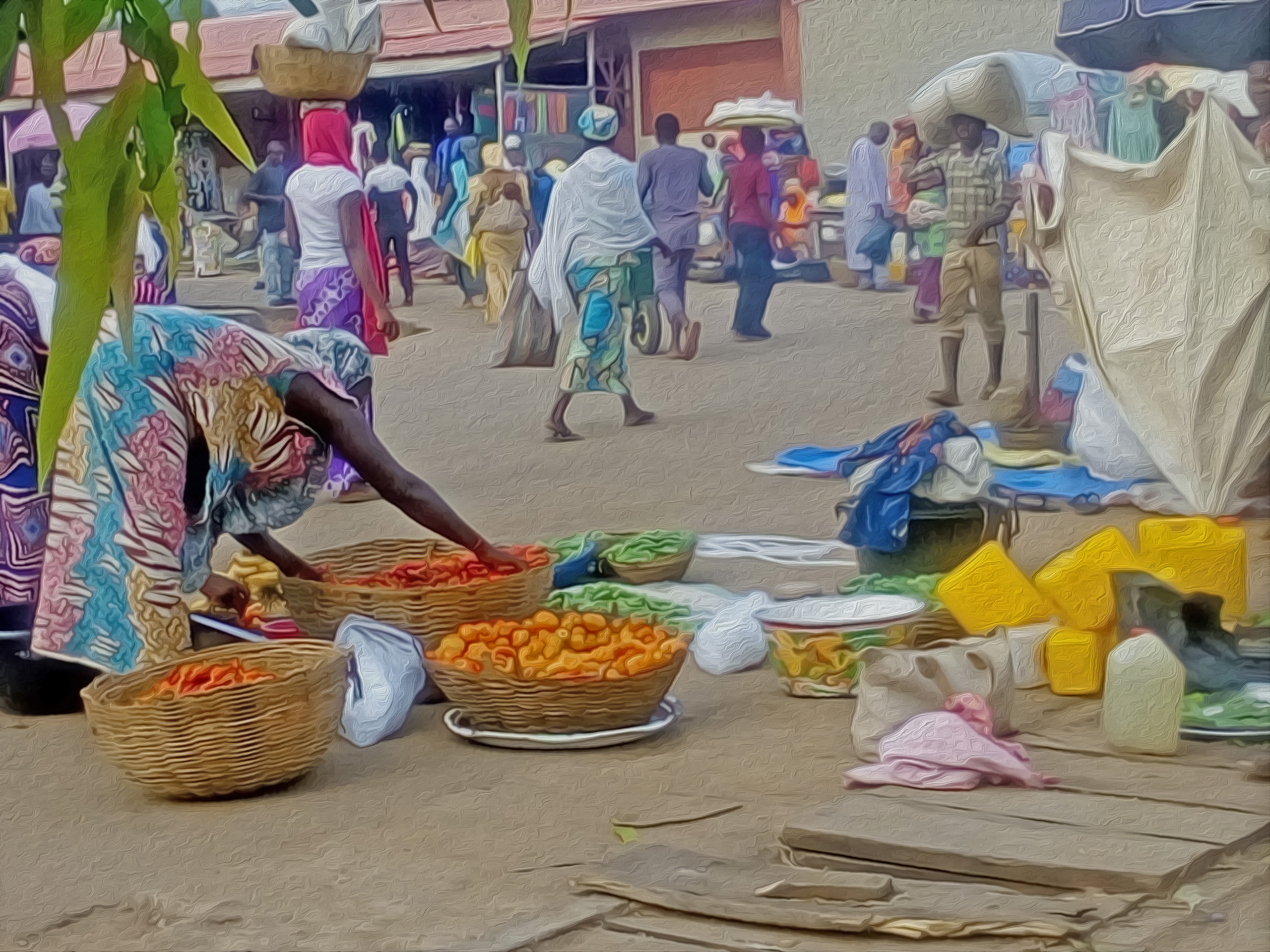
Market place in Lokoja

Lokoja has three major markets: New Market (International Market), Old Market and Kpata Market. Kpata Market and New Market have their market day every Five Days. The essential products sold in these markets are grains, vegetables and general household item.
