= Asu language =

Asu is the name of two languages:

- Asu language (Nigeria), spoken in Western Nigeria
- Asu language (Tanzania), spoken by the Gweno people in the Kilimanjaro Region of Tanzania
