= Federal Capital Territory (Nigeria) =

Federal territory of Nigeria

- Federal territory
- Flag Seal
- Nicknames: Centre of Unity
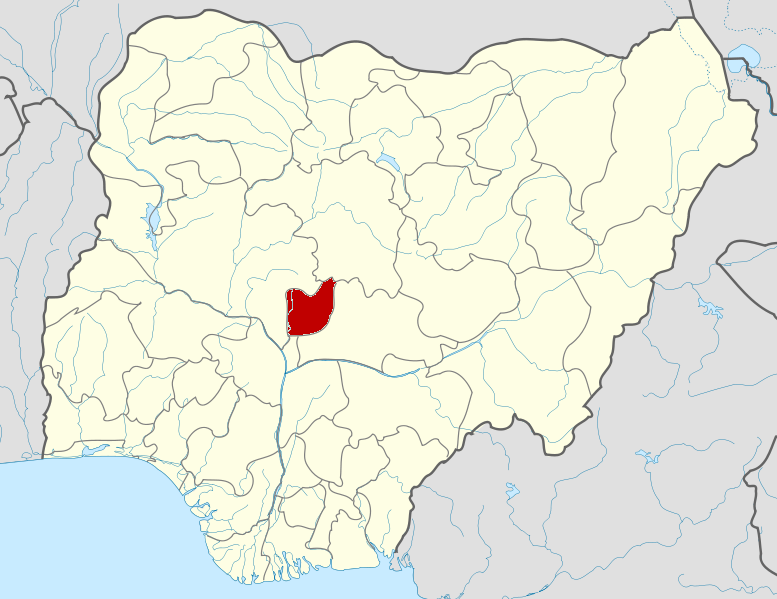
- Location of Federal Capital Territory in Nigeria
- Coordinates: 8°50′N 7°10′E
- Country: Nigeria
- Date created: 3 February 1976
- Capital: Abuja

Government
  - Body: Federal Capital Territory Administration (FCTA)
  - Minister: Nyesom Wike
  - Minister of State: Mariya Mahmoud Bunkure
  - Permanent Secretary: Ajakaiye Babatope
  - National Assembly delegation: Senator: Ireti Kingibe (LP); Representatives: List

Area
  - Total: 7,315 km^{2} (2,824 sq mi)

Population (2006 Census)^{1}
  - Total: 1,406,239
  - Estimate (2022 estimate): 3,067,500
  - Density: 192.2/km^{2} (497.9/sq mi)

GDP
- Time zone: UTC+01:00 (WAT)
- ISO 3166 code: NG-FC
- HDI (2022): 0.678 medium · 4th of 37
- Website: fcta.gov.ng

The Federal Capital Territory (FCT) is a federal territory in central Nigeria. Abuja, the capital city of Nigeria, is located in this territory. The FCT was formed in 1976 from parts of the states of old Kaduna, Kwara, Niger, and Plateau states, with the bulk of land mass carved out of Niger state. The Federal Capital Territory is within the North Central region of the country. Unlike other states of Nigeria, which are headed by elected Governors, it is administered by the Federal Capital Territory Administration, headed by a minister, who is appointed by the president.

== History ==
The Federal Capital Territory was created upon the promulgation of decree number 6 of 1976. It came into existence due to a need to find a replacement for the capital city of Lagos, which had become congested and had little space for expansion. The area chosen as the new capital was principally Gwari Land (the home of the tribes referred to as the Gbagyis, their language is referred to as Gwari) with high concentrations of Muslims and Christians and a high degree of neutrality from the dominant ethnic groups.

Decree 6 of 1976, gave the federal government rights over land within the territory. The population density prior to the takeover by the government was sparse with a population of 120,000 residents living in 840 villages and mostly of Gwari heritage. Inhabitants were relocated to nearby towns like Suleja in Niger state, and New Karshi in Nasarawa State on the outskirts of the territory.

== Geography ==
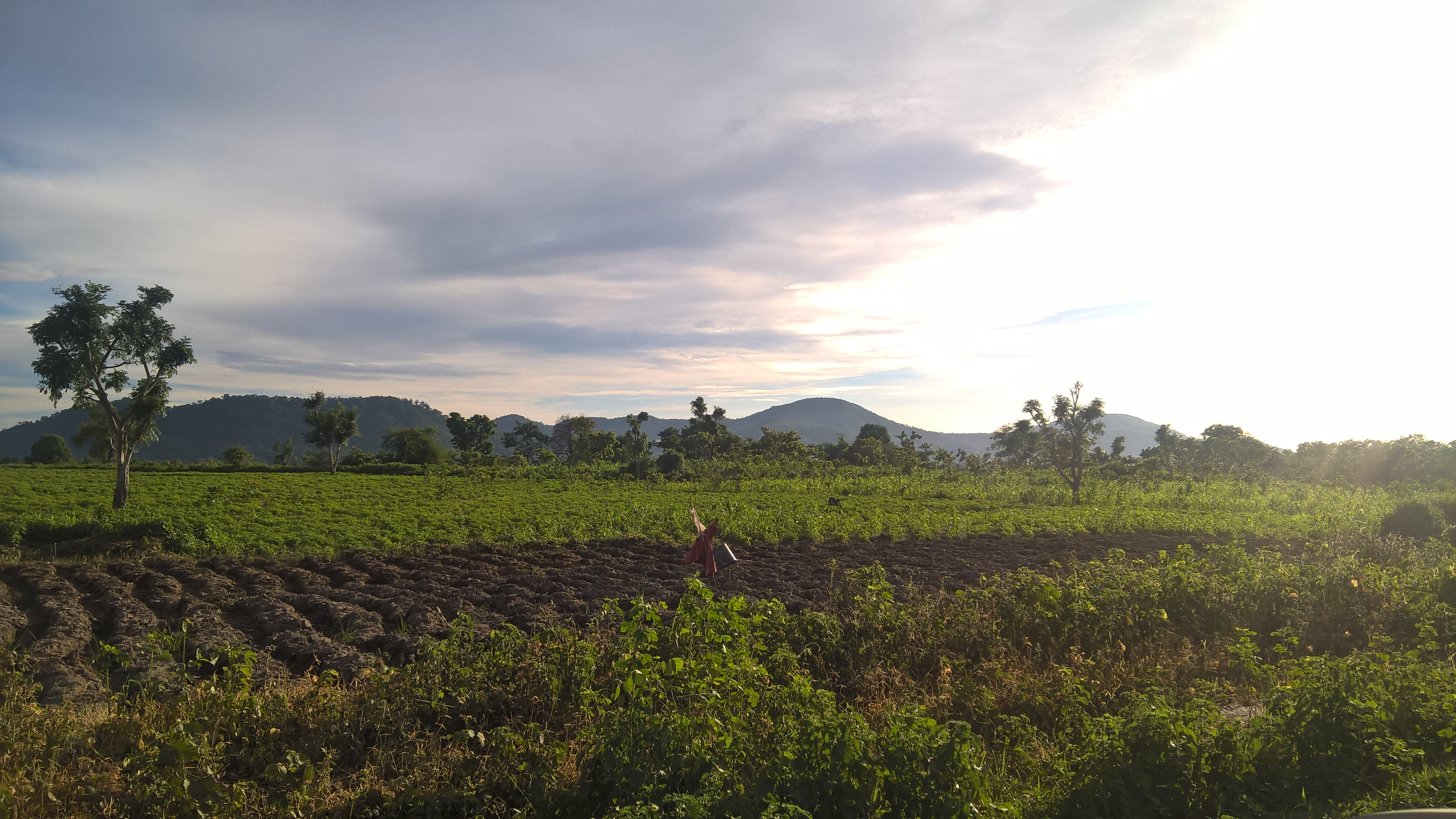
A Farmland in Kuje, the Food Basket of the Federal Capital Territory, Nigeria

The territory is located just north of the confluence of the Niger River and Benue River. It is bordered by the states of Niger to the west and north for 179 km, Kaduna to the northeast for 45 km, Nasarawa to the east and south for 156 km, and Kogi to the southwest for 17 km.

Lying between latitudes 8.25 and 9.20 north of the equator and longitudes 6.45 and 7.39 east of Greenwich Meridian, The Federal Capital Territory is geographically located at the center of the country.

The Federal Capital Territory has a landmass of approximately 7,315 km^{2}, and it is situated within the savannah region with moderate climatic conditions.

=== Natural resources ===
Minerals found in the FCT include marble, tin, clay, mica, and tantalite.

=== Wildlife ===
The hills of the FCT provide home to many bushbuck, forest Black duiker, bush pig, chimpanzee and red-flanked duiker. Also found in FCT woodland are leopard, buffalo, roan antelope, Western hartebeest, elephant, warthog, grey duiker, dog-faced baboon, patas monkey and green monkey.

=== Climate ===
Like some northern states in Nigeria, the Federal Capital Territory is relatively mild. The Federal Capital Territory is usually very hot between the months of January and April. The average daily maximum temperature of the city is above 30 °C or 86 °F, with the month of March being the hottest month. The rainy season in the territory lasts between July and October of every year but the coolest month is December, during the harmattan season. During the harmattan, there is high relative humidity, coupled with windy and foggy atmosphere.

== Administration ==
=== Federal Capital Territory Ministers ===
The Federal Capital Territory is headed by the Federal Capital Territory Minister, Barr. Nyesom Wike, who is appointed by the Federal government. The Federal Capital Territory Minister appoints members to the Abuja Metropolitan Management Council.

=== Subdivisions ===
While the Federal Capital Territory minister administers the whole of the Federal Capital Territory, the Federal Capital Development Authority (FCDA) specifically manages the construction and infrastructure development of the region.

The territory is currently made up of six local government areas, namely:

- Abaji
- Abuja Municipal
- Bwari
- Gwagwalada
- Kuje
- Kwali

== Politics ==
The council was elected in the 2022 Federal Capital Territory local elections.

Ireti Kingibe is the current representative of FCT senatorial district.

== Demographics ==
=== Languages ===
Languages of the Federal Capital Territory listed by local government area (LGA) are presented in tabular format as follows:

LGA	Languages
Abaji	Bassa; Dibo, Gupa-Abawa, Ebira, Ganagana
Municipal	Bassa; Gade; Gbagyi, Gwandara, Nupe, Hausa
Bwari	Gwandara; Bassa; Ashe; Gbagyi
Gwagwalada	Bassa; Gbari, Egbira, Hausa
Kuje	Gade; Gbagyi, Bassa
Kwali	Bassa, Gwandara; Gbagyi; Ebira, Kami, Abawa, Ganagana, Nupe, Hausa

The Hausa language is widely spoken in the Federal Capital Territory.

=== Religion ===
Sheikh Ibrahim Ahmad Maqari is the Chief Imam of the Abuja National Mosque (2017).

21% Roman Catholic with 908,744 followers in the Archdiocese of Abuja (1981) with 137 parishes under Archbishop Ignatius Ayau Kaigama (2019).

The Anglican Province of Abuja, led by Archbishop Henry Ndukuba, Primate of Nigeria (2020), also Bishop of the Diocese of Abuja (1989), also includes the Diocese of Gwagwalada led by Bishop Moses Bukpe Tabwaye (2015).
