= Nupe language =

Nigerian language

Nupe
- نࣸࢤٜ
- Native to: Nigeria
- Region: Niger State, Kwara State, Kogi State, Nasarawa State, Federal Capital Territory, Nigeria
- Ethnicity: Nupe
- Native speakers: L1: 1.8 million (2020); L2: 200,000 (1999)
- Language family: Niger–Congo?: Atlantic–Congo; Volta–Niger; noi; Nupoid; Nupe–Gbagyi; Nupe languages; Core Nupe; Nupe cluster; Nupe
- Dialects: Nupe Tako (Bassa Nge)
- Writing system: Latin, Ajami

Language codes
- ISO 639-3: nup
- Glottolog: nupe1254

Nupe (also known as Anufe, Nyinfe, Nupenci in Hausa, and Tapa in Yoruba) is a Volta–Niger language of the Nupoid branch primarily spoken by the Nupe people of the North Central region of Nigeria. Its geographical distribution stretches and maintains pre-eminence in Niger State as well as Kwara, Kogi, Nasarawa and the Federal Capital Territory. Nupe is closely related to Kakanda in structure and vocabulary. There are at least two markedly different dialects of Nupe: Nupe central and Nupe Tako.

== Demographics ==
Nupe is the language spoken by the Nupe people, who reside mainly in Niger State in Nigeria, occupying a lowland of about 18000 square kilometers in the Niger Basin, mostly north of the river between the Kontagora and Guara confluents from Kainji to below Baro, and also Kwara State, Kogi State and the Federal Capital Territory.

Nupe is spoken mainly in Bida, Niger State and surrounding areas. It is also spoken in villages on the Benue River near Ibi and east of Lafia. Nupe has assimilated earlier ethnolinguistic groups such as the Benu of Kutigi, who originally were Kanuri-speaking, and the Gbagyi at Lemu.

Nupe-Tako ("The Nupe Below", also called "Bassa Nge") is spoken by the Bassa Nge, who also speak the Bassa Nge or Bassa Nupe dialect of Basa-Benue and is lexically most closely related to central Nupe.

== Classification ==
The Nupe language belongs to the Nupoid branch of the Benue-Congo group of languages. Other languages in the group are Igbira (Ebira), Gade, and Kakanda. Nupe is related most closely to Kakanda in structure and vocabulary. There are at least two markedly different dialects: Nupe central and Nupe Tako.

== Phonology ==
Vowels
| | Front | Back |
|---|---|---|
| Close | i ĩ | u ũ |
| Mid | e | o |
| Open | a ã | |

Consonants
| | | Labial | Alveolar | Postalveolar | Palatal | Velar | Labial-velar | Glottal |
|---|---|---|---|---|---|---|---|---|
| Stop | voiceless | p | t | | | k | k͡p ⟨kp⟩ | |
| Stop | voiced | b | d | | | ɡ | ɡ͡b ⟨gb⟩ | |
| Affricate | voiceless | | t͡s ⟨ts⟩ | t͡ʃ ⟨c⟩ | | | | |
| Affricate | voiced | | d͡z ⟨dz⟩ | d͡ʒ ⟨j⟩ | | | | |
| Fricative | voiceless | f | s | ʃ ⟨sh⟩ | | | | h |
| Fricative | voiced | v | z | ʒ ⟨zh⟩ | | | | |
| Nasal | | m | n | | | | | |
| Approximant | | | l | | j ⟨y⟩ | | w | |
| Trill | | | r ⟨r⟩ | | | | | |

Indication of tones
| High tone | (´) acute |
| Low tone | (`) grave |
| Mid tone | unmarked |
| Falling tone | (ˆ) circumflex or (ˇ) caron |
| Rising tone | (ˇ) caron or (ˆ) circumflex |

== Proverbs ==
Common sayings come in the forms of egankogi (parable), gangba (warning), egancin (idiom), ecingi (riddle/tales) and eganmagan (proverb).

Eganmagan (proverb, plural eganmaganzhi) are wise sayings spoken among the Nupes. They are didactic proverbs which educate, entertain, and teach morality. They form part of the oral culture on norms and ethics of Nupe societies, and are passed from one generation to another through songs, stories, fables, folk tales, myths, legends, incantations, communal discussions, and worship.

Similar to other African proverbs, Nupe proverbs associate or relate people's action to their immediate environment in order to explain or correct particular situations, norms, issues, or problems. They also enlighten, warn and advise, or teach language in order to change perception which is believed to become reality.
