= Kakanda =

Kakanda may be,

- Kakanda language
- Kakanda mines
