= GBY =

GBY refer to:

- Daughters of Jacob Bridge (Hebrew: גשר בנות יעקב, Gesher Bnot Ya'akov)
- Gwari language
