= Kupa language =

Spoken language

Kupa
- Native to: Nigeria
- Region: Kogi State/Kwara
- Native speakers: (20,000 cited 1998)
- Language family: Niger–Congo?: Atlantic–Congo; Volta–Niger; noi; Nupoid; Nupe–Gbagyi; Nupe languages; Core Nupe; Gupa cluster; Kupa

Language codes
- ISO 639-3: kug
- Glottolog: kupa1238

Kupa is spoken in villages in Kupaland which are Abugi, Ikin-Sami circus of villages (Kapu, Agini, Buzhi, etc), Ikin-makun circles, Kuchalu, Sampi and Eggan ( all located on the southern part of the Niger River).

Kupa is under Lokoja L.G.A. It is most closely related to the Kakanda language. Koelle (1854) is a source. Egã (Eggan) village has very few Kupa speakers.

Kupa, also as a Tribe and district as its district head called the 'Maiyaki of Kupa' residing at Abugi. It has roughly 70 villages under it.

Towns and villages in Kupa-land
Abugi
Kapu
Mabo
Agini Agunpo
Agini Api-akuru
Awumi
Gwaci
Ebbe
Migegi
Fikara
Bagi
Gunji-Twaki
Mikugi
Dekugi
Ebwa
Apo
Dakunzhi
Gucidan
Angbapu
Tsanawa
Lagan
Bataku
Igban
Kayinko
Gbedumagi
Kumi
Nadzogun
Kpaji
Balagan
Gbaci
Kinami
Yinkara
Elaggan
Giri
Arakpo
Eggan
Ramba
Kuchalu
Elugbwara:- * Eban * Egbaci * Ekara (Karagi) * Elandza * Kpakpa * Vazhi
Sampi
Elagi
Batake
Koci
Buzhi * Kpagun
Kukaragi
Miza
Dzakanti
Gugurugi
Kpoku
Yaro
Lantsara
Kugbagi
Lusuta
Yekaraji

All (*) in the list of villages are named settlements under the main village.

The entire list was according to an authentic source; MA Zakari Brainbox on Kupa-Nupe Nigeria.
