= States of Nigeria =

First-level administrative divisions of Nigeria

- Category: Federated states
- Location: Federal Republic of Nigeria
- Number: 36
- Populations: 1,704,358 (Bayelsa State) – 9,401,288 (Kano State); Mean: 5,300,000
- Areas: 3,580 km^{2} (1,381 sq mi) (Lagos State) – 76,360 km^{2} (29,484 sq mi) (Niger State); Mean: 25,660 km^{2} (9,907 sq mi)
- Government: State government
- Subdivisions: Local government area (LGA)

Nigeria is a federation of 36 states, each of which is a semi-autonomous political unit that shares power with the federal government as enumerated under the Constitution of the Federal Republic of Nigeria. In addition to the states, there is the Federal Capital Territory (FCT), in which the capital city of Abuja is located. The FCT is not a state, but a territory of the federal government, governed by an administration headed by a minister. Each state is subdivided into local government areas (LGAs). There are 774 local governments in Nigeria. Under the Nigerian Constitution, the 36 states enjoy substantial autonomy but are not sovereign entities, as ultimate authority lies with the federal government. Amendments to the Constitution can be proposed by the National Assembly, but for an amendment to be valid, it must be approved by a two-thirds majority of the 36 state legislatures, as required under Section 9 of the 1999 Constitution of Nigeria.

== Current states and the Federal Capital Territory ==
A clickable map of Nigeria showing its 36 states and the federal capital territory.

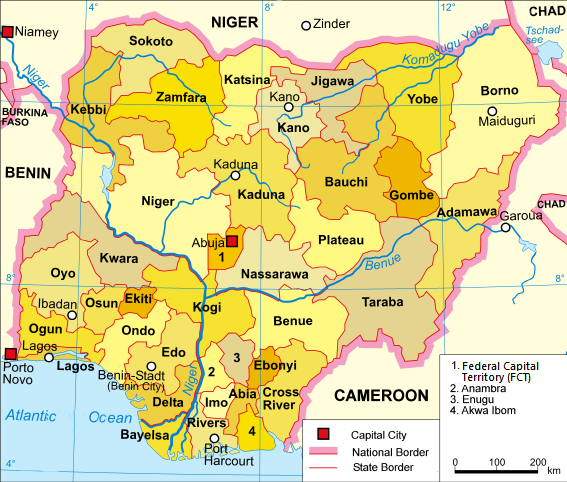
A clickable map of Nigeria exhibiting its 36 states and the federal capital territory.

States
Abia; Adamawa; Akwa Ibom; Anambra; Bauchi; Bayelsa; Benue; Borno; Cross River; Delta; Ebonyi; Edo	Ekiti; Enugu; Gombe; Imo; Jigawa; Kaduna; Kano; Katsina; Kebbi; Kogi; Kwara; Lagos	Nasarawa; Niger; Ogun; Ondo; Osun; Oyo; Plateau; Rivers; Sokoto; Taraba; Yobe; Zamfara
Territory
Federal Capital Territory

States of Nigeria
Name	ISO 3166-2 code	Seal	Location	City		Geopolitical zone	Area	Population (2019 estimate)	Density (pop/km^{2})
Name	ISO 3166-2 code	Seal	Location	Capital	Largest	Geopolitical zone	Area	Population (2019 estimate)	Density (pop/km^{2})
Abia	AB			Umuahia	Aba	South East	6,320 km^{2} (2,440 sq mi)	3,841,943	607
Adamawa	AD			Yola		North East	36,917 km^{2} (14,254 sq mi)	4,536,948	123
Akwa Ibom	AK			Uyo		South South	7,081 km^{2} (2,734 sq mi)	4,780,581	675
Anambra	AN			Awka	Onitsha	South East	4,844 km^{2} (1,870 sq mi)	5,599,910	1,157
Bauchi	BA			Bauchi		North East	45,893 km^{2} (17,719 sq mi)	7,540,663	164
Bayelsa	BY			Yenagoa		South South	10,773 km^{2} (4,159 sq mi)	2,394,725	222
Benue	BE			Makurdi		North Central	34,059 km^{2} (13,150 sq mi)	5,787,706	170
Borno	BO			Maiduguri		North East	70,898 km^{2} (27,374 sq mi)	5,751,590	81
Cross River	CR			Calabar		South South	20,156 km^{2} (7,782 sq mi)	4,175,020	207
Delta	DE			Asaba		South South	17,698 km^{2} (6,833 sq mi)	5,307,543	300
Ebonyi	EB			Abakaliki		South East	6,400 km^{2} (2,500 sq mi)	3,007,155	470
Edo	ED			Benin City		South South	19,559 km^{2} (7,552 sq mi)	4,461,137	228
Ekiti	EK			Ado Ekiti		South West	6,353 km^{2} (2,453 sq mi)	3,350,401	528
Enugu	EN			Enugu		South East	13,161 km^{2} (5,081 sq mi)	4,396,098	334
Federal Capital Territory	FC			Abuja		North Central	7,315 km^{2} (2,824 sq mi)	1,406,239	192
Gombe	GO			Gombe		North East	18,768 km^{2} (7,246 sq mi)	3,623,462	193
Imo	IM			Owerri		South East	5,530 km^{2} (2,140 sq mi)	5,167,722	935
Jigawa	JI			Dutse		North West	23,154 km^{2} (8,940 sq mi)	6,779,080	293
Kaduna	KD			Kaduna		North West	46,053 km^{2} (17,781 sq mi)	8,324,285	181
Kano	KN			Kano		North West	20,131 km^{2} (7,773 sq mi)	14,253,549	708
Katsina	KT			Katsina		North West	24,192 km^{2} (9,341 sq mi)	9,300,382	384
Kebbi	KE			Birnin Kebbi		North West	36,800 km^{2} (14,200 sq mi)	5,001,610	136
Kogi	KO			Lokoja		North Central	29,833 km^{2} (11,519 sq mi)	4,153,734	139
Kwara	KW			Ilorin		North Central	36,825 km^{2} (14,218 sq mi)	3,259,613	89
Lagos	LA			Ikeja	Lagos	South West	3,577 km^{2} (1,381 sq mi)	12,772,884	3572
Nasarawa	NA			Lafia		North Central	26,256 km^{2} (10,137 sq mi)	2,632,239	100
Niger	NI			Minna		North Central	76,363 km^{2} (29,484 sq mi)	6,220,617	81
Ogun	OG			Abeokuta		South West	16,981 km^{2} (6,556 sq mi)	5,945,275	350
Ondo	ON			Akure		South West	15,500 km^{2} (6,000 sq mi)	4,969,707	321
Osun	OS			Osogbo		South West	9,251 km^{2} (3,572 sq mi)	4,237,396	458
Oyo	OY			Ibadan		South West	28,454 km^{2} (10,986 sq mi)	7,512,855	264
Plateau	PL			Jos		North Central	30,913 km^{2} (11,936 sq mi)	4,400,974	142
Rivers	RI			Port Harcourt		South South	11,077 km^{2} (4,277 sq mi)	7,034,973	635
Sokoto	SO			Sokoto		North West	25,973 km^{2} (10,028 sq mi)	5,863,187	226
Taraba	TA			Jalingo		North East	54,473 km^{2} (21,032 sq mi)	3,331,885	61
Yobe	YO			Damaturu	Potiskum	North East	45,502 km^{2} (17,568 sq mi)	3,398,177	75
Zamfara	ZA			Gusau		North West	39,762 km^{2} (15,352 sq mi)	5,317,793	134

== Evolution of Nigerian administrative divisions ==
Date	Events	Map
1960–1963	At the time of independence in 1960, Nigeria was a federal state of three regions: Northern, Western, and Eastern. Additionally, provinces, which were a legacy of colonial and protectorate times, remained extant until they were abolished in 1976.	
1963–1967	In 1963, a new region, the Mid-Western Region, was created from the Western Region.	
1967–1976	In 1967, the regions were replaced by 12 states by military decree. From 1967 to 1970 the Eastern Region attempted to secede, as a nation called Biafra during the Nigerian civil war. The Mid-Western Region was renamed to the State of Bendel during this period.	
1976–1987	In 1976, seven new states were created, making 19 altogether.	
1987–1991	During this period, there were 21 states and the Federal Capital Territory.	
1991–1996	During this period, there were 30 states and the Federal Capital Territory. The Federal Capital Territory was established in 1991. In 1987 two new states were established, followed by another nine in 1991, bringing the total to 30. The latest change, in 1996, resulted in the present number of 36 states.	

== Government ==
States of Nigeria have the right to organize and structure their individual governments in any way within the parameters set by the Constitution of Nigeria.

=== Legislature ===
At the state level, the legislature is unicameral, with the number of its members equal to three times the number of legislators it has in the Federal House of Representatives. It has the power to legislate on matters on the concurrent and residual lists.

=== Executive ===
At the state level, the head of the executive is the governor, who has the power to appoint people to the state executive council, subject to the advice and consent of the state house of assembly (legislature). The head of a ministry at the state level is the commissioner, who is assisted by a permanent secretary, who is also a senior civil servant of the state.

=== Judiciary ===
The Judiciary is one of the co-equal arms of the state government concerned with the interpretation of the laws of the state government. The judiciary is headed by the chief justice of the state appointed by the governor subject to the approval of the state house of assembly.

== Chronology ==
Regions		States				
1960	1963	1967	1976	1987	1991	1996
Eastern		South-Eastern	Cross River	Akwa Ibom		
Eastern		South-Eastern	Cross River	Cross River		
Eastern		East Central	Imo		Imo	
Eastern		East Central	Imo		Abia	
Eastern		East Central	Anambra		Enugu	Ebonyi
Eastern		East Central	Anambra		Enugu	Enugu
Eastern		East Central	Anambra		Anambra	
Eastern		Rivers				Bayelsa
Eastern		Rivers				Rivers
Western	Mid-Western		Bendel		Delta	
Western	Mid-Western		Bendel		Edo	
Western	Western	Lagos				
Western	Western	Western	Ogun			
Western	Western	Western	Ondo			Ekiti
Western	Western	Western	Ondo			Ondo
Western	Western	Western	Oyo		Osun	
Western	Western	Western	Oyo		Oyo	
Northern		Benue-Plateau	Plateau			Nasarawa
Northern		Benue-Plateau	Plateau			Plateau
Northern		Benue-Plateau	Benue		Benue	
Northern		Benue-Plateau	Benue		Kogi	
Northern		Kwara			Kogi	
Northern		Kwara			Kwara	
Northern		Kano			Jigawa	
Northern		Kano			Kano	
Northern		North Central	Kaduna	Kaduna		
Northern		North Central	Kaduna	Katsina		
Northern		North Western	Niger			
Northern		North Western	Sokoto		Kebbi	
Northern		North Western	Sokoto		Sokoto	Sokoto
Northern		North Western	Sokoto		Sokoto	Zamfara
Northern		North Eastern	Bauchi			Bauchi
Northern		North Eastern	Bauchi			Gombe
Northern		North Eastern	Borno		Borno	
Northern		North Eastern	Borno		Yobe	
Northern		North Eastern	Gongola		Adamawa	
Northern		North Eastern	Gongola		Taraba	

== See also ==
- List of Nigerian states by population
- ISO 3166-2:NG
- List of current state governors in Nigeria

== Sources ==
- Gboyega Ajayi (2007). The military and the Nigerian state, 1966–1993: a study of the strategies of political power control. Trenton, New Jersey: Africa World Press. ISBN 978-1-59221-568-3.
- Solomon Akhere Benjamin (1999). The 1996 state and local government reorganizations in Nigeria. Ibadan: Nigerian Institute of Social and Economic Research. ISBN 978-181-238-9.
- Rotimi T. Suberu (1994). 1991 state and local government reorganizations in Nigeria. Ibadan: Institute of African Studies, University of Ibadan. ISBN 978-2015-28-8.
