= Gbagyi people =

Ethnic group in Nigeria

Gbari/Gbagyi people (Agbari/Agbagyi)
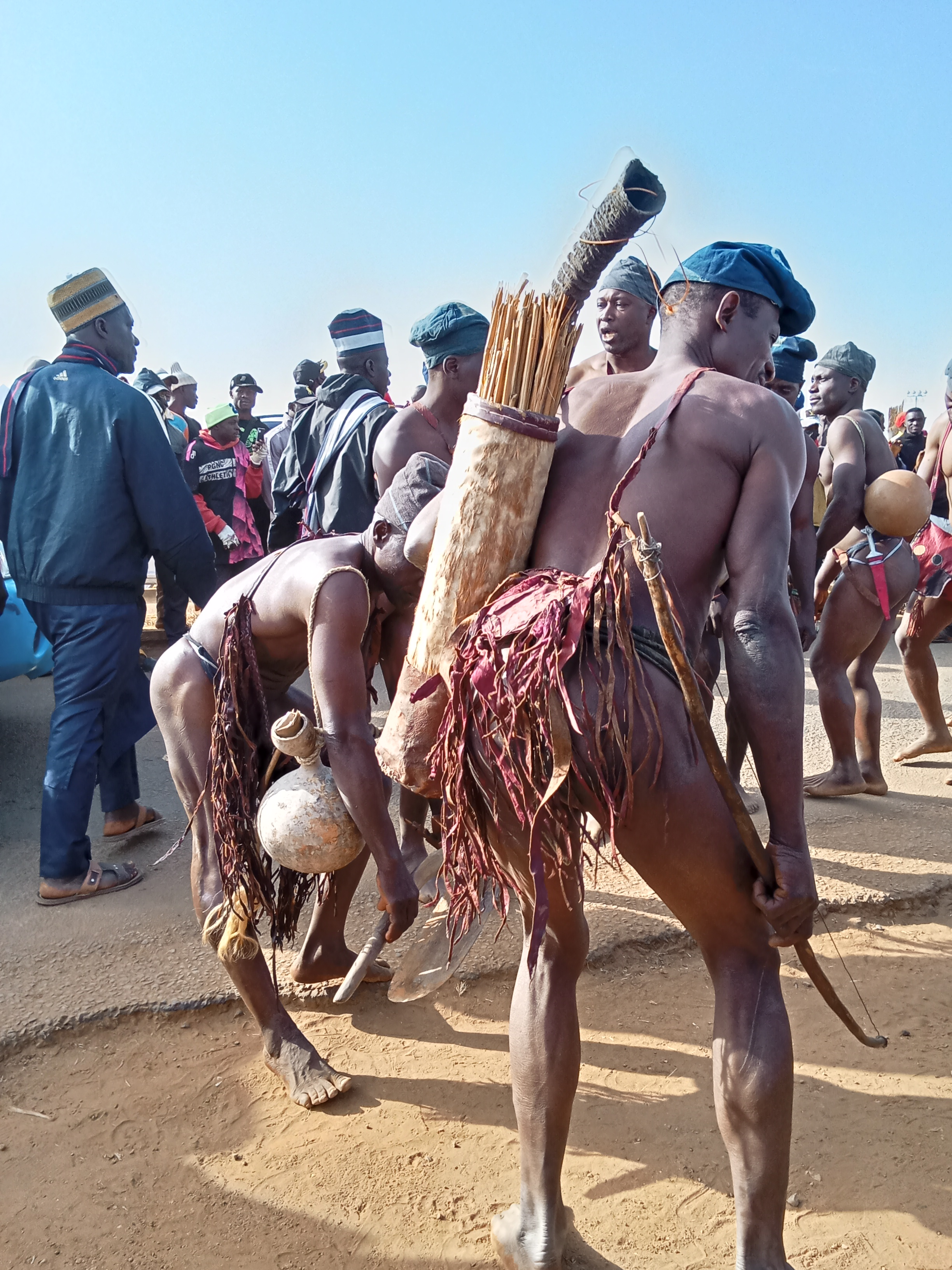
- Gbagyi dancers

Total population
- c. 5 million

Regions with significant populations
- Nigeria

Languages
- Gbagyi/Gwari

Religion
- Majority Christian; Minority Islam; Traditional African religion

Related ethnic groups
- Nupe people, Yoruba, Igala, Ebira

The Gbagyi or Gbari (plural – Agbagyi/Agbari) are an ethnic group found predominantly in Central Nigeria with an estimated population of 12 million spread in four states, including Abuja, and located in thirty local government areas. It is also the name of their language. Members of this ethnic group speak two dialects. While speakers of the dialects were loosely called Gwari by both the Hausa and the Fulani, as well as by Europeans during pre-colonial Nigeria, they prefer to be known as Gbagyi/Gbari. They live in Niger State, the Federal Capital Territory – Abuja, and Kaduna State. They are also found in Nasarawa State, central Nigeria Area. Gbagyi/Gbari is one of the most populous ethnic groups in the middle belt and indigenous to the Federal Capital Territory of Nigeria. This means Gbagyi people are among the bonafide owners of the Nigerian capital city, Abuja.

== History ==
=== Social-political structure ===
Historically, the Gbagyi/Gbari practice a patrilineal kinship system. The lowest tier of authority is found in the extended family compound led by the oldest male. Being a patriarchal community, the Osu (king) is the highest tier of authority in a Gbagyi/Gbari settlement and he is assisted by a group of elders who are charged with the responsibility of ensuring peace in the land.

Women historically have been known to carry things on their shoulders instead of their heads. This is because it is believed that since the head is the "King of the entire body", you should not carry anything normal on it.

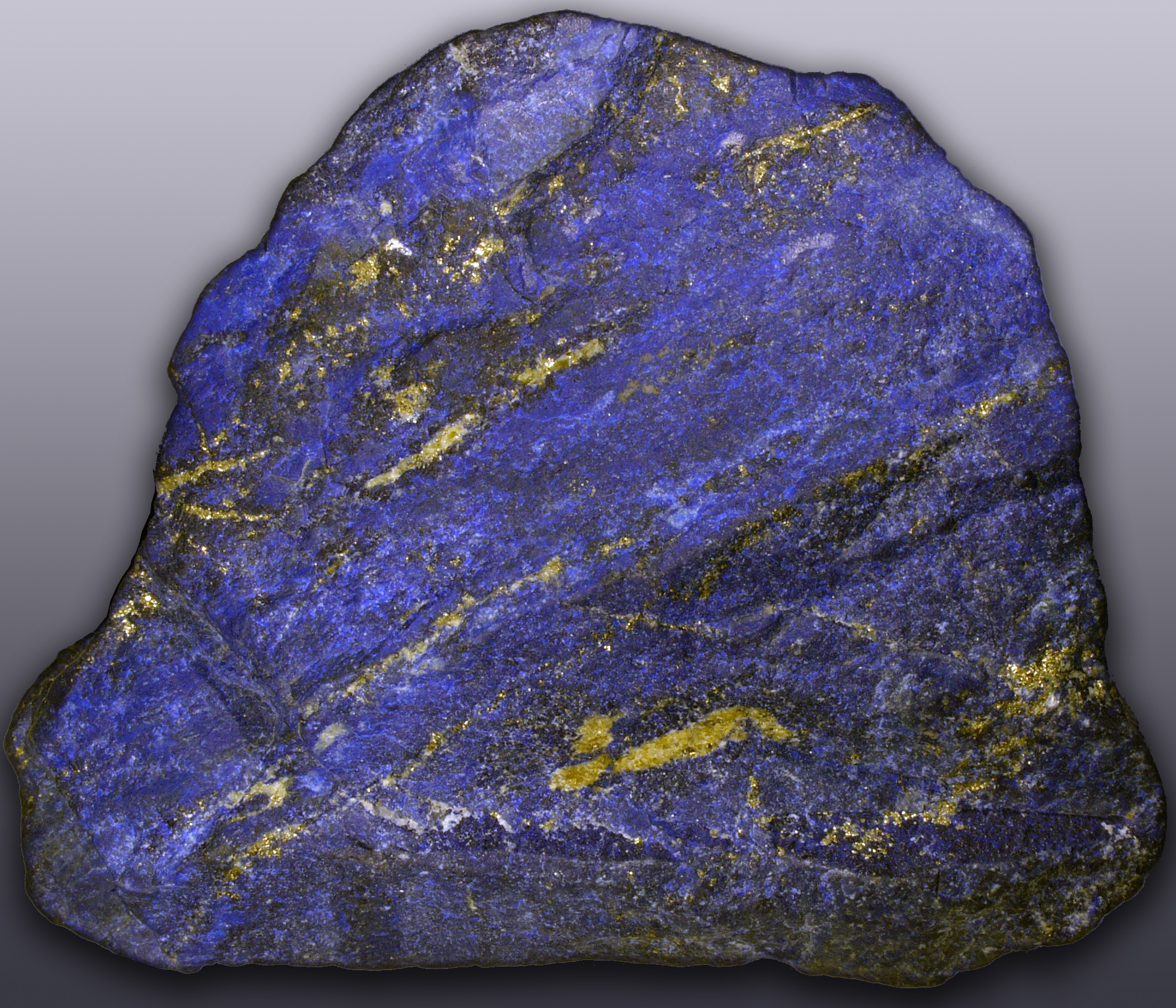
Lapis lazuli is a relatively rare, semi-precious stone

Additionally, Gbagyi familiarity with the lapis lazuli stone has been taken in some quarters as indication of Egyptian origin. The question of Gbagyi origin is further complicated by the fact that the Nupe and Gbagyi languages have recognised affinity and the Koro, whose history seems to have been intricately linked with that of the Gbagyi, actually claim linkage with Wukari and the Kwarafara empire (Cadman, 1913).

== Settlement ==
The Gbagyi people are found in various locations in Middle Belt (Central) Nigeria. They inhabit the western parts of Abuja, southern Niger State, Chikun Local Government Area with its headquarters at Kujama in Kaduna state and Nassarawa state. Significant Gbagyi towns include Minna, Karu, Kuta, Kwakuti, Kwali, Gawu, Yelwa, Toto, Araba, Nakuse, Rubochi, Abaji, Geku, Gadabuje, Majaga, (Gusolo) Gussoro, (Gbada) Gwada, Guni, Fuka, Galkogo, Maikunkele, Manta, Wushapa (Ushafa), Bisi, Bwaya (Bwari), Suleja, Shiroro (Shilolo), Beji, Diko, Alawa, Erena, Paiko/ Paigo, Lambata, Zugba, Nuku, Gbogo and Farin Doki. There are some theories that posit a reason for the scattered settlements and migration of the Gbagyi people. Some historians believe the Gbagyi were displaced from their original settlements during the Fulani Jihad, while some local historians link migration with the need for farmland by the Gbagyi. Chigudu, pp. 1–2

Gbagyi settlements can be both large and small. In locations where farming is the dominant occupation, the settlements tend to be small so that enough land is available for farming.

=== Displacement from lands in Abuja ===
The Gbagyi were the largest among the ethnic groups that inhabited the land proposed for development when Abuja was chosen as Nigeria's new federal capital. The result was dislocation, the removal of people from their ancestral homes, from spiritual symbols such as Zuma Rock, seeing their ancestral land referred to as no-man's land, and issues about adjusting to the new environment given by the government. However, many displaced families were given housing, but some lived in transit and settlement camps for a long while.

== Culture ==
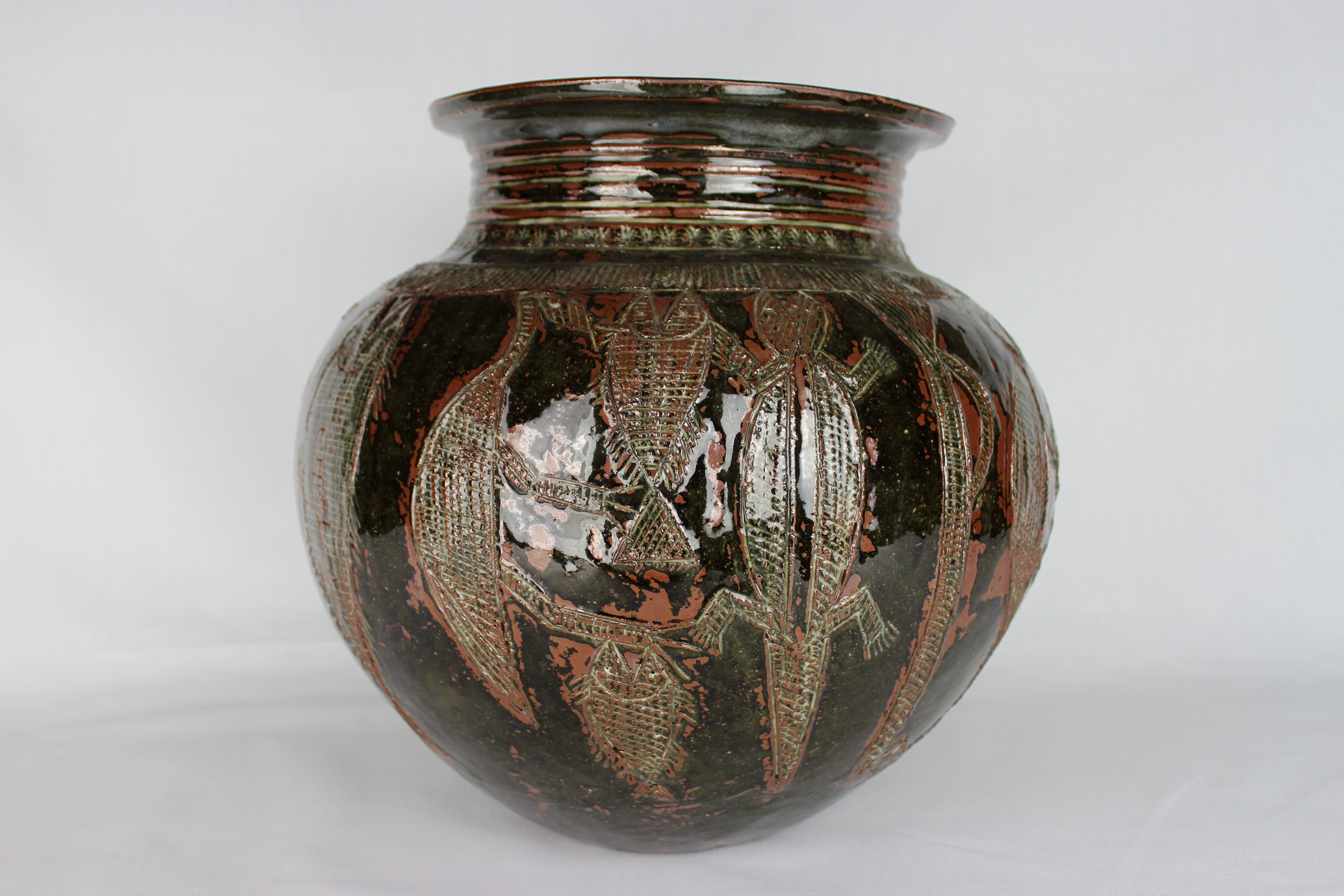
Hand-Built pot by Ladi Kwali (YORYM-2004.1.919)

The Gbagyi people are known to be peace-loving, transparent and accommodating people. Northerners are fond of saying in Hausa language muyi shi Gwari Gwari, "let’s do it like the Gbagyi" or "in the Gbagyi way". According to Theophilus Tanko Chigudu, the Gbagyi people have emerged as a unique breed among Nigerians: their culture shows how much they have come to terms with the universe. Daily they aspire to give life a meaning no matter the situation in which they find themselves. The name Gbagyi has been linked with many meanins such as "benevolence, ingenuity, reliability, magnanimity, allegiance, and a profound inclination towards familial relationships. The Gbagyi ethnic group is renowned for their distinct propensity to embrace others, their openness, and their dedication to promoting harmony."

=== Language ===
The Gbagyi language is part of the Kwa sub-division of the Niger-Congo language family, however, some researchers such as Kay Williamson put the language in the Benue-Congo family. The people speak two dialects that are sometimes called Gbari (Gwari yamma) and Gbagyi dialects.

=== Religion ===
The Gbagyi people are typically adherents of the Christian faith, however a growing subset practice Islam and their own traditional religion. In their traditional religion, some Gbagyi believe in a God called Shekwoyi (one who was there before their ancestors) but they also devote themselves to appeasing deities such as Maigiro. Many Agbagyi believe in reincarnation.

The rapid growth of Christianity was due to the Sudan Interior Mission (which also came to be known locally as Evangelical Church of West Africa now Evangelical Church Winning All) and the Baptist Missionaries from the south western part of Nigeria. Islam first appeared in the region around the 18th-19th centuries due to the impact of the Fula jihads but it was during the colonial and post-colonial period which saw most actual conversions to Islam among the Gbagyi.

== Arts ==
=== Pottery ===
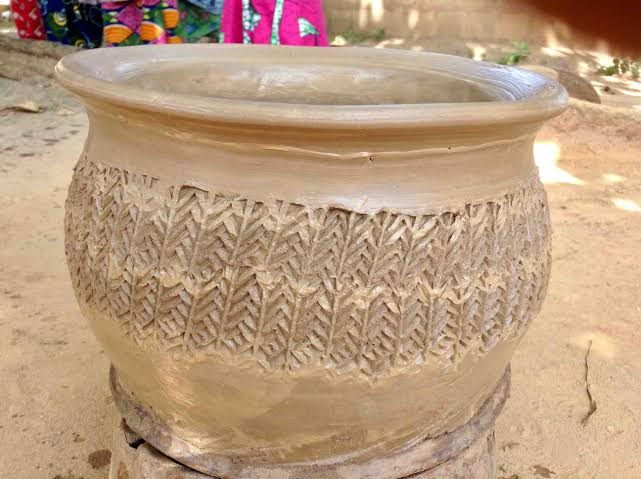
This pot is a local hand made Gbagyi pot

Pottery is passed down matrilinially as it is considered to be a woman's role and craft. The clay is harvested with hoes and hand-sorted. Women often work with their children especially girls when collecting the clay. Women knead the clay by hand and use wooden shaping materials and old knives to shape the clay. Dried clay or fine sand is sometimes used to help the consistency of the clay when it is too soft. Gwari potters do not use pottery wheels but instead use the pinching and coiling method, This is done by layering coils of clay on top of each other to build up the shape of the object being created. Decorating the pots is simple, similar to cloth decoration. Because pottery is considered magical and important, there are specific rules that need to be followed when sourcing the clay. Women who are pregnant or on their period cannot go to the claypits and broken Calabash cannot be used to get the clay. Different pots are made for different purpose in Nigerian culture, some for everyday use and others for rituals. There are three main types of pots, Randa, Tulu, and Kasko, who all have their own uses.

==== Randa ====
The Gwarin Yamma are specialists in making randa pots.Characterized by a wide mouth, short neck, and narrow rim,it is the largest style of pot at about 20-30 gallons, made specifically for storing drinking water. However, during ceremonies, these randas can be used for storing Giya (beer).

==== Tulu ====
Tulu are used for storing giya. They can be many different sizes with long necks, fat bellies, and narrow mouths and wide, flat rims. They are never used for anything other than beer storage. The giya that is stored is considered safe from evil spirits touching it over night, and they tulu's are used to give offerings to the juju (gods) they worship.

==== Kasko ====
Kasko pots can be many shapes and sizes. They are used for either storing water, oil, meat or fish, and salt or it can be used for cooking or serving food. Grain can be stored in giant kaskos and can be used to carry water home from the river.

==== Pottery Training Center ====
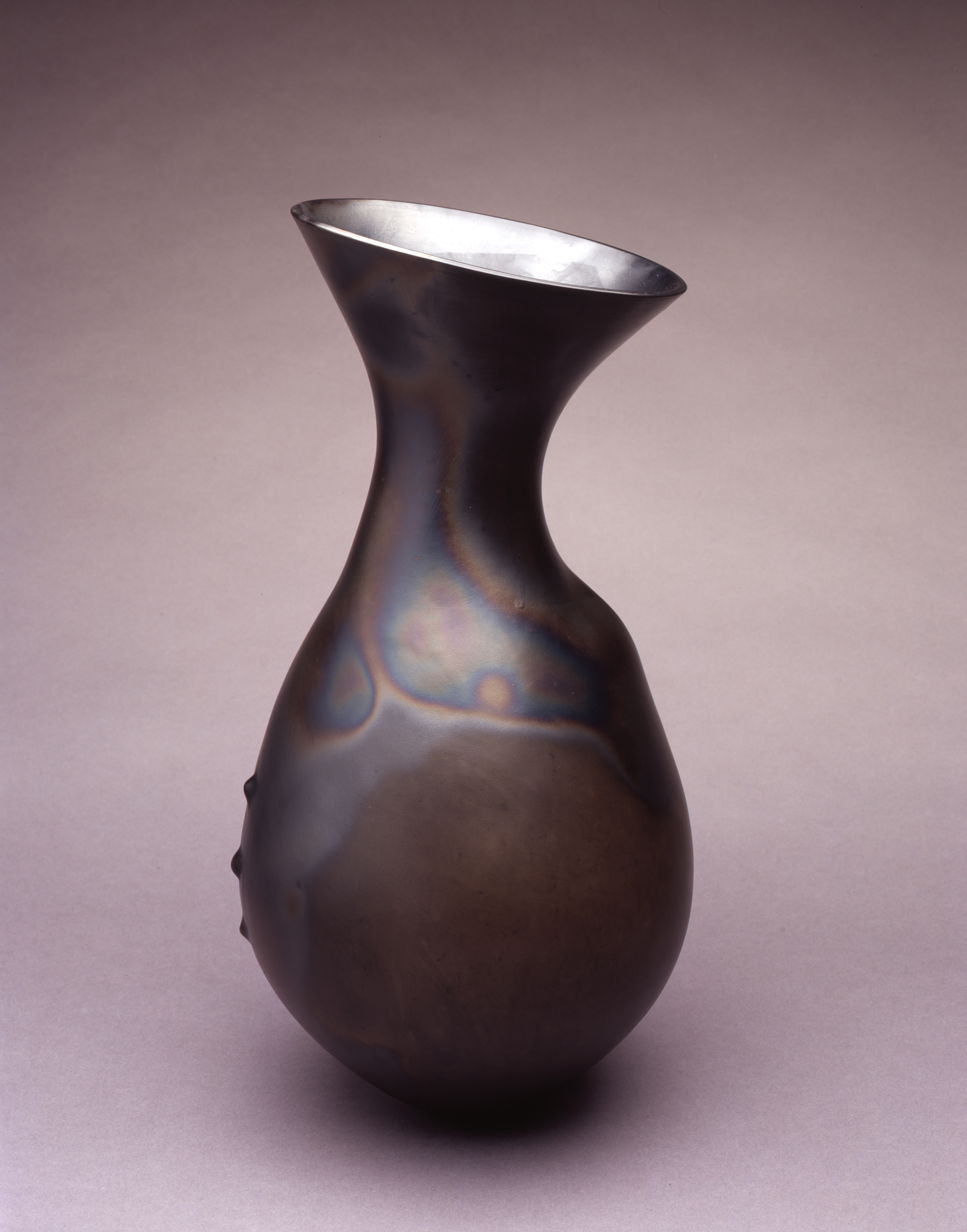
Pot made by Magdalene Odundo, a Kenyan artist who studied at the Pottery Training Center

The Pottery Training Centre (PTC) in Abuja was founded by Micheal Cardew in 1952. It was originally a center for only men to learn pottery, even though it is a traditionally female craft. Edward Harland Duckworth wanted to have Nigerian pottery rival Japanese and Czechoslovak wares and encouraged more industry in Nigeria. Cardew started with small scale workshops before August 1951 when the site for the PTC was found. Since 1951, the PTC has been funded by the government through the Ministry of Trade and Industry.

Ladi Kwali also known as Lady Kwali was the first female student in 1954 and paved the way for many more women such as Magdalene Odundo, a ceramist born in Kenya, who studied at the PTC in 1974. She met Ladi Kwali there and she was greatly influenced by her. Ladi Kwali graduated the PTC in 1959 and became an employee for the centre.

=== Traditional cloth ===
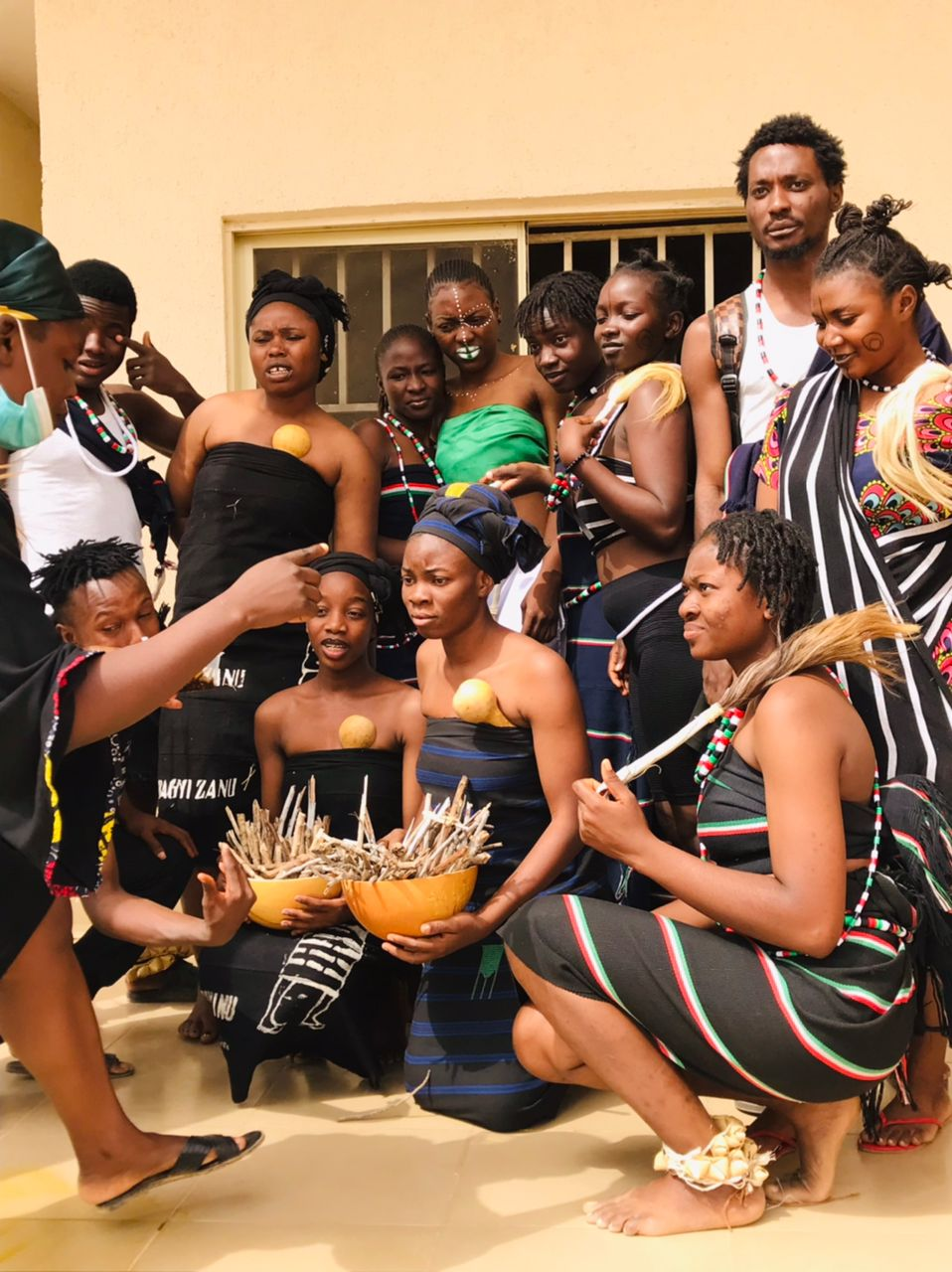
Traditional Gbagyi Clothing

The Gbagyi people wear two types of traditional cloth. Old dark blue cloth is worn by many generations. The cloth is traditionally worn around private parts, but now in post colonial times, the blue cloth is used for pants and skirts and worn with white shirts The newer cloth is black and white. These fabrics have pictures of women carrying things on their shoulders. Written on the cloth is the words "Mizhin Gbagyizanu" which means “we are Gbagyi people”.

== List of notable Gbagyi people ==
- Ibrahim Babangida, former president of Nigeria
- Bez, musician
- Ladi Kwali, potter
- Abu Bakr Sadiq, poet from Minna

== Sources ==
- Shekwo, Joseph (1984). Understanding Gbagyi folktales : premises for targeting salient electronic mass media programs (Thesis). Northwestern University.
- Rosendall, Elias (1998). Aspects of gbari grammar (Thesis). University of Texas at Arlington.
