= Kami language =

Nupoid language of Nigeria

Kami
- Native to: Nigeria
- Region: Niger State
- Native speakers: (5,000 cited 1992)
- Language family: Niger–Congo?: Atlantic–Congo; Volta–Niger; noi; Nupoid; Nupe–Gbagyi; Nupe languages; Core Nupe; Gupa cluster; Kami

Language codes
- ISO 639-3: kmi
- Glottolog: kami1258
- ELP: Kami (Nigeria)

Kami is a Nupoid language spoken in Niger State, Nigeria. Kami is spoken only in Ebo town, located to the south of Lapai. There are at most 500 speakers. Kami is closely related to Gupa and Dibo.

There is also a fishing group known as Kede (Kyadya, Kiadia, Kyedye) who speak the same language.
