= Gade language =

Gadoid language of Nigeria

Gade
- Native to: Nigeria
- Region: Nasarawa state, Niger State, Abuja, Kaduna state, Kogi state
- Ethnicity: Gade people
- Native speakers: 3,200,000 (2006)
- Language family: Niger–Congo?: Atlantic–Congo; Volta–Niger; noi; Gadoid; Gade-Gadoid; Gade

Language codes
- ISO 639-3: ged
- Glottolog: gade1242

Gade (Gad) is an independent Gadoid language of Nigeria. Glottolog 4.7 (2022) classifies it as an independent branch of Benue-Congo rather than as a Nupoid language of the Gade people.

== Distribution ==
Ethnologue lists the following locations:

- Federal Capital Territory: Abuja Municipal Area Council and Kuje LGA
- Nasarawa State: Nasarawa town, Toto LGA, Takalfia, Uke, New Ara, Zebede (Kowayarda), Zamba (Panda), Pyanko, etc in Karu LGA, Gora in Keffi LGA, and New Karshi in Karu LGA
- Niger: New Wuse, Iwa Kpụ̀kpụ̀ in Tafa LGA and Tufa, Izom, Lambata in Gurara LGA
