= Kakanda language =

Nupoid language of Nigeria

Kakanda
- Hyabe
- Native to: Nigeria
- Region: Niger State, Kwara State, FCT
- Native speakers: 100,000 (2008)
- Language family: Niger–Congo?: Atlantic–Congo; Volta–Niger; noi; Nupoid; Nupe–Gbagyi; Nupe languages; Core Nupe; Gupa cluster; Kakanda

Language codes
- ISO 639-3: kka
- Glottolog: kaka1264

Kakanda (also known as Akanda or Hyabe) is a Nupoid language of Nigeria. Kakanda is spoken in and around Kupa and Eggan (near the Niger-Benue confluence). There are scattered villages stretching from the Niger-Benue confluence to as far as Muregi. There are at least 10,000 people. It is most closely related to Gupa and Kupa, although there are also some similarities with Ebira.

Baka is a Kakanda-speaking town. Blench (2019) lists Kakanda–Budon and Kakanda–Gbanmi/Sokun as dialects.
