= Asu language (Nigeria) =

Nupoid language of Western Nigeria

Asu
- Native to: Nigeria
- Region: Niger State
- Native speakers: 4,200 (2021)
- Language family: Niger–Congo?: Atlantic–Congo; Volta–Niger; noi; Nupoid; Nupe–Gbagyi; Nupe languages; Asu

Language codes
- ISO 639-3: aum
- Glottolog: asun1235

Asu (also known as Abewa or Ebe) is a Nupoid language spoken in Niger State in Western Nigeria. The Asu live in about ten villages southeast of Kontagora.
