= Ebira language =

Niger-Congo language spoken in Nigeria

Ebira
- Native to: Nigeria
- Region: Kogi state, Nassarawa state, FCT, Kwara state, Niger State, Benue state, Edo state, Ondo State
- Ethnicity: Ebira
- Native speakers: 2.2 million (2020)
- Language family: Niger–Congo?: Atlantic–Congo; Volta–Niger; noi; Nupoid; Ebira–Gade; Ebira

Language codes
- ISO 639-3: igb
- Glottolog: ebir1243

Ebira (pronounced as /eh 'bi ra/) is a Nupoid language spoken by around 2 million people in Nigeria's Middle Belt. It is the most divergent Nupoid language with the central dialect known as Okene.

== Geographic distribution ==
The majority of speakers are in Kogi State in the Central part of that state; constituting the second largest ethnic group according to national population commission census 2006 Nasarawa State in Toto Local Government Area, where the name is usually spelt Egbura; Edo State in the Town of Igarra, where a similar language is known as Etuno; and in the Federal Capital Territory in the Town of Abaji. It is also spoken in Lapai (Niger State), Makurdi (Benue State and Kwara State and some are also found in Ondo State (Akoko).

== Dialects ==
Varieties of Ebira are:

- Tao dialect, the more prominent dialect used in media and publishing. It is spoken to the west of the Niger-Benue confluence
- Koto (Okpoto) dialect, spoken to the northeast of the Niger-Benue confluence. It is known only from a wordlist in Sterk (1978a).

Blench (2019) lists Okene, Etuno (Tụnọ), and Koto. Glottolog divides Ebira into three dialects Igara, Koto and Okene.

== Phonology ==
=== Consonants ===
		Labial	Alveolar	Palatal	Velar	Glottal
Plosive/ Affricate	voiceless	p	t	t͡ɕ	k	
Plosive/ Affricate	voiced	b	d	d͡ʑ	ɡ	
Fricative	voiceless		s	(ʃ)		h
Fricative	voiced	v	z	(ʒ)		
Nasal		m	n	ɲ	ŋ	
Tap			ɾ			
Approximant		w	(l)	j		

- Sounds /s, z/ are heard as [ʃ, ʒ] when before a front-close vowel in syllable-initial position.
- [l] is in free variation with /ɾ/.
- Voiceless sounds /p, t, k/ can also be heard as slightly aspirated [pʰ, tʰ, kʰ].

=== Vowels ===
	Front	Central	Back
Close	i		u
Near-close	ɪ		ʊ
Close-mid	e		o
Open-mid	ɛ		ɔ
Open		a	
