= Dibo language =

Nupoid language of Nigeria

Dibo
- Ganagana
- Native to: Nigeria
- Region: Niger State, Plateau State
- Native speakers: 215,000 (2020)
- Language family: Niger–Congo?: Atlantic–Congo; Volta–Niger; noi; Nupoid; Nupe–Gbagyi; Nupe languages; Core Nupe; Nupe cluster; Dibo

Language codes
- ISO 639-3: dio
- Glottolog: dibo1247

Dibo, a.k.a. Ganagana, Ganagawa, Zhitako, is a Nupoid language spoken in Nigeria. It is spoken in about twenty villages south of Lapai. There is only 66% cognacy with Central Nupe, out of 200 words.
