= Gwari language =

Language in Nigeria

Gbari
- Native to: Nigeria
- Region: Abuja, Kaduna State, Niger State, and Nasarawa State
- Ethnicity: Gbagyi people
- Native speakers: 1,290,000 Gbagyi (2020); 550,000 Gbari (2020)
- Language family: Niger–Congo?: Atlantic–Congo; Volta–Niger; noi; Nupoid; Nupe–Gbagyi; Gbari

Language codes
- ISO 639-3: Either: gbr – Gbagyi gby – Gbari
- Glottolog: gbag1256

Gwari is a Nupoid language spoken by the Gbagyi people, which make up over a million people in Nigeria. There are two principal varieties, Gbari (West Gwari) and Gbagyi (East Gwari), which have some difficulty in communication; sociolinguistically they are distinct languages.

== Phonology ==
=== Vowels ===
Vowels
	Front	Central	Back
Close	i ĩ		u ũ
Mid	e ẽ		o õ
Open		a ã	

- /i, u, e, o/ can also have allophones [ɪ, ʊ, ɛ, ʌ].
- Nasal vowels /ĩ, ũ, ẽ, õ/ can also be heard as [ɪ̃, ʊ̃, ɛ̃, ʌ̃].

=== Consonants ===
Gbagyi consonants
		Labial	Alveolar	Palatal	Velar	Labial- velar	Glottal
Nasal		m	n	(ɲ)	(ŋ)		
Stop/ Affricate	voiceless	p	t	(t͡ʃ)	k	k͡p	
Stop/ Affricate	voiced	b	d	(d͡ʒ)	g	ɡ͡b	
Fricative	voiceless	f	s	(ʃ)			h
Fricative	voiced	v	z	(ʒ)			
Approximant	central		(ɹ)	j		w	
Approximant	lateral		l				

- The following sounds may be labialized as /pʷ, bʷ, fʷ, vʷ, kʷ, ɡʷ, mʷ, k͡pʷ, ɡ͡bʷ, hʷ/ and palatalized as /pʲ, bʲ, fʲ, vʲ, kʲ, ɡʲ, mʲ, lʲ, wʲ/.
- Sounds /t, d, s, z, n/ when palatalized are always heard as [tʃ, dʒ, ʃ, ʒ, ɲ].
- Sounds /f, b/ can be heard as bilabial sounds [ɸ, β] in free variation.
- /n/ is heard as velar [ŋ] when preceding velar consonants.
- /n/ becomes a labialized-velar [ŋʷ] when preceding a /w/.
- Sounds /bʷ, ɡʷ, ɡʲ/ are softened to fricatives [βʷ, ɣʷ, ɣʲ] when preceding a glide, in medial-intervocalic position.
- /ɡ͡b/ is heard as an implosive [ɓ] in free variation.
- /h/ only has a limited occurrence, but it also may be allophonic with /f/ in Northern Gbagyi. In Southern Gbagyi, [h] is heard in free variation with /j/, when /j/ occurs before /i/ in syllable-final position.
- The palatalized /lʲ/ may also be heard as a central glide [ɹ].

Gbari consonants
		Labial	Alveolar	Palatal	Velar	Labial- velar	Glottal
Nasal		m	n	(ɲ)	(ŋ)		
Stop	voiceless	p	t		k	k͡p	
Stop	voiced	b	d		g	ɡ͡b	
Stop	implosive	ɓ	ɗ				
Stop	ejective				kʼ		
Affricate	voiceless		t͡s	(t͡ʃ)			
Affricate	voiced			(d͡ʒ)			
Fricative	voiceless	f	s	(ʃ)			h
Fricative	voiced	v	z	(ʒ)			
Approximant	central		(ɹ)	j		w	
Approximant	lateral		l				

- The following sounds may be labialized as /pʷ, bʷ, fʷ, vʷ, kʷ, ɡʷ, mʷ/ and palatalized as /pʲ, bʲ, fʲ, vʲ, tʲ, dʲ, kʲ, ɡʲ, mʲ, lʲ, wʲ/.
- Stops may also be heard as post-nasalized as [pᵐ, bᵐ, tⁿ, dⁿ, kᵑ, ɡᵑ, k͡pᵐ, ɡ͡bᵐ].
- Palatalized sounds /tʲ, dʲ/, typically occur as [tʃ, dʒ] or [tʲ, dʲ] in free variation, and as [tʃ, dʒ], they can be represented orthographically as <ch, j>. Sounds /s, z, n/ when palatalized are always heard as [ʃ, ʒ, ɲ], and can be represented orthographically as <sh, zh, ny>.
- Sounds /f, fʲ, b/ can be heard as bilabial sounds [ɸ, ɸʲ, β] in free variation.
- /d/ can also be heard as [ɾ].
- Sounds /b, ɡ/ and /bʷ, ɡʷ, ɡʲ/ are softened to fricatives [β, ɣ] and [βʷ, ɣʷ, ɣʲ] when preceding a glide, in medial-intervocalic position.
- /n/ becomes a labialized-velar [ŋʷ] when preceding a /w/.
- The palatalized /lʲ/ may also be heard in free variation, as a central glide [ɹ] or as a palatalized equivalent [ɹʲ].
- /n/ when palatalized is heard as a palatal nasal [ɲ], and is velar as [ŋ] when preceding velar consonants.

== Varieties ==
Gbagye is also known as Gwari-Matai or Gwarin Ngenge, which are recently adopted cover terms.

There are two separate Gbagyi groups living in:

- Minna and Kuta (more prominent group)
- around Diko, northeast of Suleja

Gbagye is the only Nupoid language that has the bilabial implosive /ɓ/.

Gbagyi (also known as Gwari) is a cover term for all the Gbari-speaking peoples, and includes many varieties.

Gbari-Yama is a cover term used for all southern Gbari dialects. There are two closely related dialects, which are:

- Shigokpna
- Zubakpna

Gbedegi is an extinct language (possibly a Nupe dialect) spoken near Mokwa (Nadel 1941).
