= Culture of Nigeria =

The culture of Nigeria is shaped by Nigeria's multiple ethnic groups. The country has 527 languages, with many at risk of extinction. Nigeria has over 1,150 dialects and ethnic groups. The three largest ethnic groups are the Hausa that are predominantly in the north, the Yoruba who predominate in the southwest, and the Igbo in the southeast. There are many other ethnic groups with sizeable populations across the different parts of the country. The Kanuri are located in the northeast part of Nigeria, the Tiv are in the north central, and the Efik-Ibibio are in the south. The Bini are predominantly in the region between Yorubaland and Igboland.

Nigeria's other ethnic groups, sometimes called 'minorities', are found throughout the country but especially in the north and the middle belt. The traditionally nomadic Fula can be found all over West and Central Africa. The Fula and the Hausa are almost entirely Muslim, while the Igbo are almost completely Christian and so are the Bini and the Ibibio. The Yoruba make up about 21% of the country's population and are predominantly Christians and Muslims on equal footing, with a notable presence of traditionalists. Indigenous religious practices remain important to all of Nigeria's ethnic groups however, and frequently these beliefs are blended with Christian or Muslim beliefs, a practice known as syncretism.

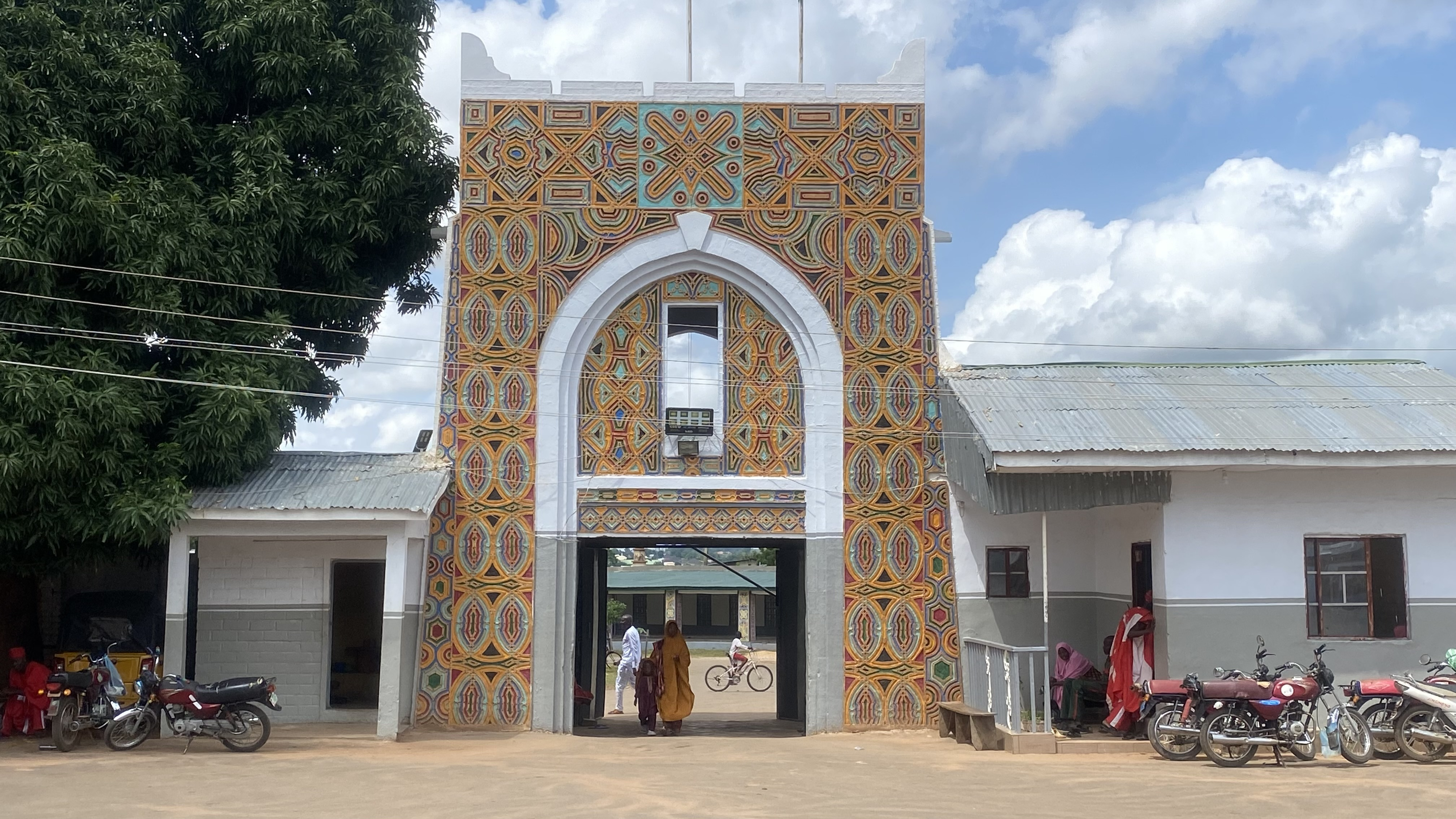
The palace of the Emir of Bida

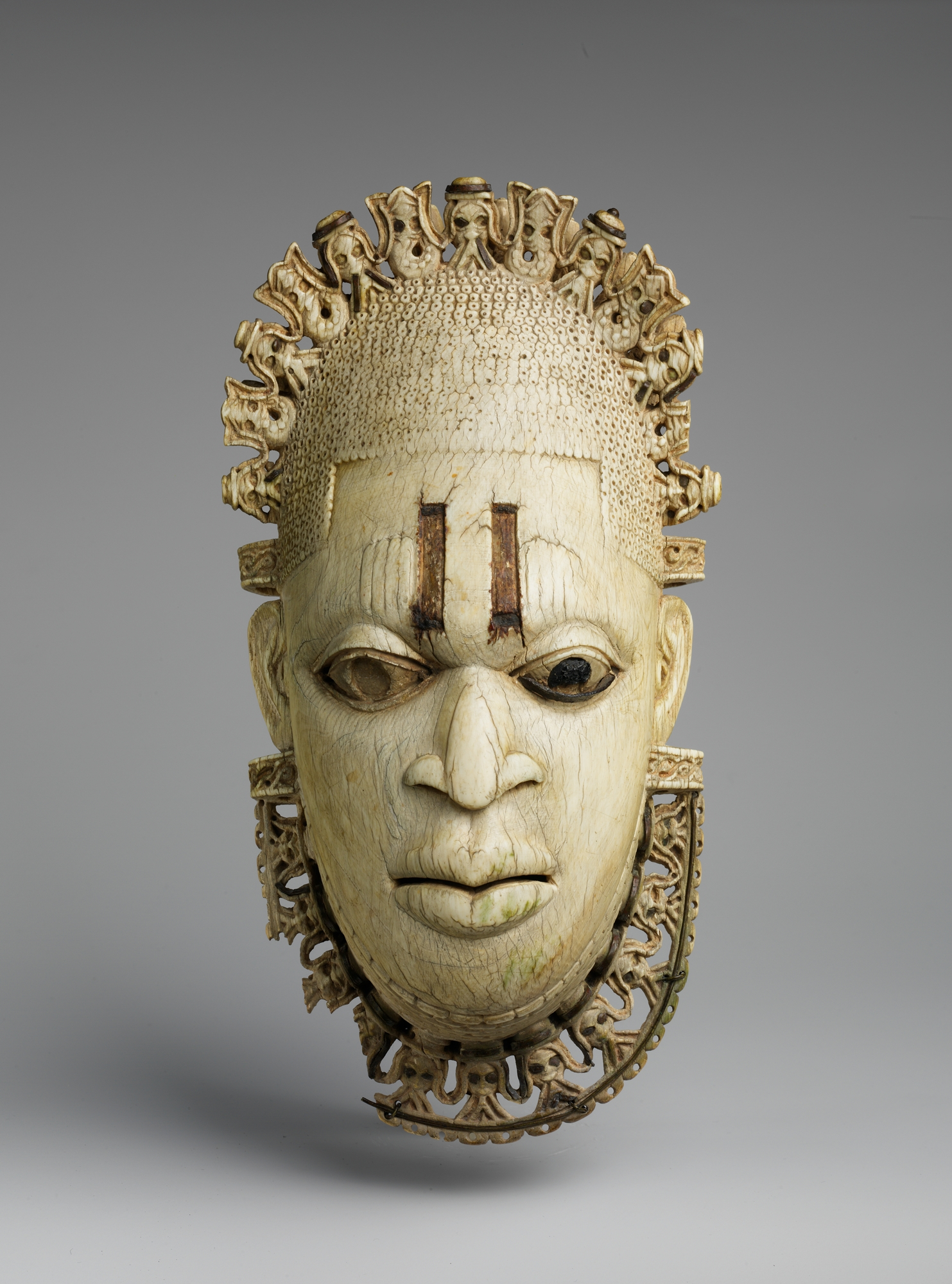
The Benin ivory mask from the Metropolitan Museum of Art

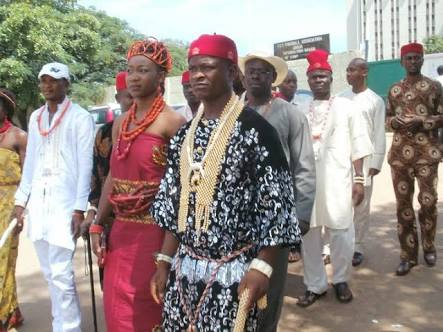
Igbo tribespeople during a ceremonial occasion

== Major ethnic cultures ==
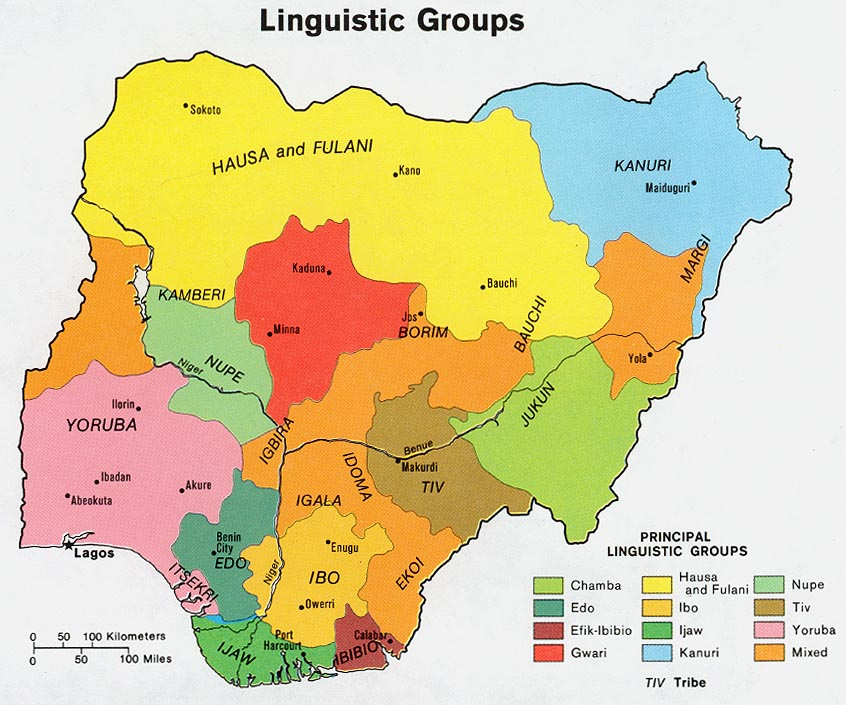
Language distribution around 1979

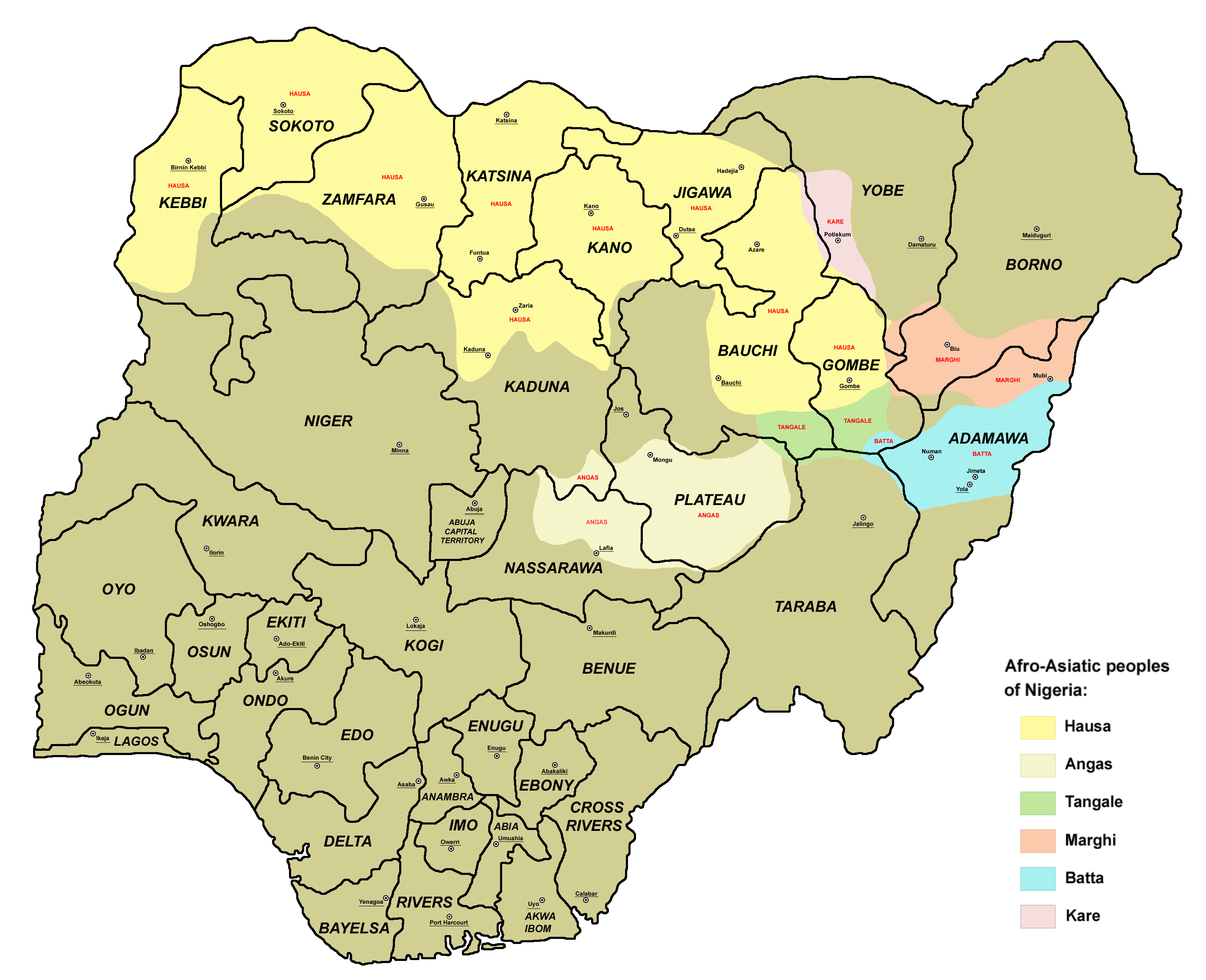
Hausa (in yellow) and other Chadic languages

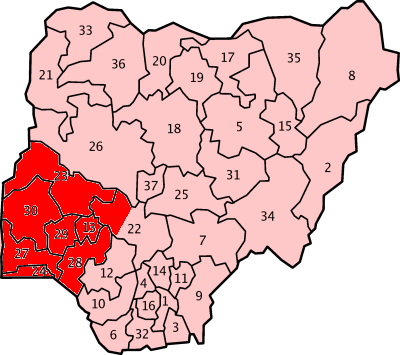
Area of Yorubas

Igbo in the Southeast

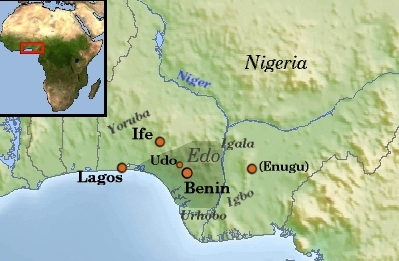
Binis in the South

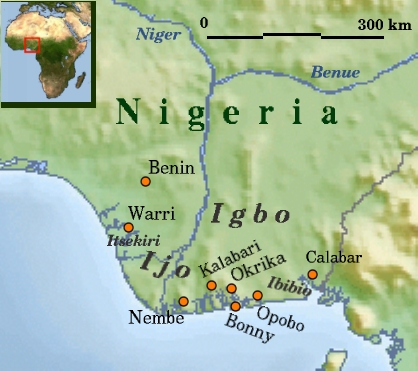
Ijaw (Ijo)

=== Bini culture ===
The Binis, also called the Edo people, are a people of the South South region of modern Nigeria; they are said to be around 3.8 million as of the 21st century. They are ruled by monarchs, and are famous for their Benin Bronzes. In the pre-colonial period, they controlled a powerful empire. They are an ethnic group that is primarily found in Edo State, and spread across the Delta, Ondo, and Rivers states of Nigeria in smaller concentrations. The language they speak is called the Edo language. The Bini people are closely related to several other ethnic groups, that usually speak Edo languages, for example the Esan, however it is important to address the fact that the name "Benin" (and "Bini") is a Portuguese corruption, which came from the word "Ubinu", which came into use during the reign of Oba Ewuare the Great, C. 1440. The word "Ubinu" was used to depict and portray the royal administrative centre or capital proper of the kingdom, Edo. The word "Ubinu" was later corrupted to Bini by a number of mixed ethnicities staying together at the centre, and it was then further corrupted to Benin around the year 1485 at the time when the Portuguese people started making trade relations with Oba Ewuare.

=== Hausa-Fulani Culture ===
The Hausa and Fula ethnic groups are said to be one of the largest ethnic groups in Nigeria, if not the largest, with a population of over 20 million people. The Hausa and Fula live in the northern part of Nigeria. They are both different tribes, but are often counted as one due to cultural similarity. The bulk of the Hausa-Fulani population is mainly centered in and around the central of Sokoto, Kano and Katsina, which are said to be important market centers on the southern area of the trans-Saharan caravan trade routes.

Long before the arrival of the Fula people, the Hausas had already formed and made well-organised city states; some of these states includes Katsina, Daura, Kano, Zazzau (Zaria), Biram, Gobir and Borno. However, some of these states were conquered, taken over and re-established by the Fula people which then led to the formation of a few other kingdoms such as Katagum and Gombe. The arrival of the Fula people into Hausaland brought about great changes in the land, which included the reformation of Islam. This then ended up playing a significant role in the social life and culture of the Hausa people. In education, dress and taste, the Hausa people and their counterparts the Fula have become a significant part of the Islamic world; this said influence still remains until the current day. The Fula practice the art of whipping a suitor before giving his bride to him as part of their marriage obligation. This particular obligation has helped to increase the practice of monogamy among themselves, and it is called Sharo. The Fula people are also nomadic in nature; this nomadic lifestyle spread them into virtually all of West Africa. They are extremely tolerant of the languages of other people around them, leading to the suppression of theirs - especially in northern Nigeria by Hausa.

The Hausas, on the other hand, are said to be very good merchants. This helped spread them to some areas around Nigeria. They have monarchs, are known for celebrating the Hawan Sallah festival, and are also followers of the religious teachings of Sheikh Usman dan Fodio.

=== Igbo culture ===
The Igbo (or Ibo) people, are one of the largest ethnic groups to ever exist in Africa. They have a total population of about 20 million people. Most people who are a part of this ethnic group are based in the southeastern part of Nigeria, they contribute to about 17 percent of the country's population. They can also be found in large numbers in Cameroon and other African countries. It is believed that the Igbo people originated in an area that is about 100 miles north of their current location at the confluence of the Niger and Benue Rivers. The Igbo people share linguistic ties with their neighbours the Bini, Igala, and Idoma, with whom it is believed they were closely related until five to six thousand years ago. The first Igbo in the region may have moved onto the Awka-Orlu plateau between four and five thousand years ago. The eastern part of Nigeria is the home of the Igbos, who are mostly Christians. Their traditional religion is known as Omenani/Omenala. Both concepts, each an aspect of a single whole, aspire to protect and preserve the purity, sanctity and sacredness of the land and the people therein. 'Omenana' is man-made; it is easily changed and is adaptable. 'Odinana', on the contrary, is a code of life, handed down from Chukwu, God the Creator, to Eri, the patriarch of the Igbo race, to prevent chaos and confusion. The earth spirit, Ana, is 'Odinana', as is the sacred role of yam in the Igbo world, the right of inheritance, and the place of the elder. 'Odinana', as the immutable customary rites and traditions of the Igbo world, is enduring and cuts across indigenous Igbo people, while 'Omenana' is rather relative from one section of the Igbo to the other. Socially, the Igbos are led by monarchs who had limited power historically. These figures are expected to confer subordinate titles upon men and women that are highly accomplished. This is known as the Nze na Ozo title system.

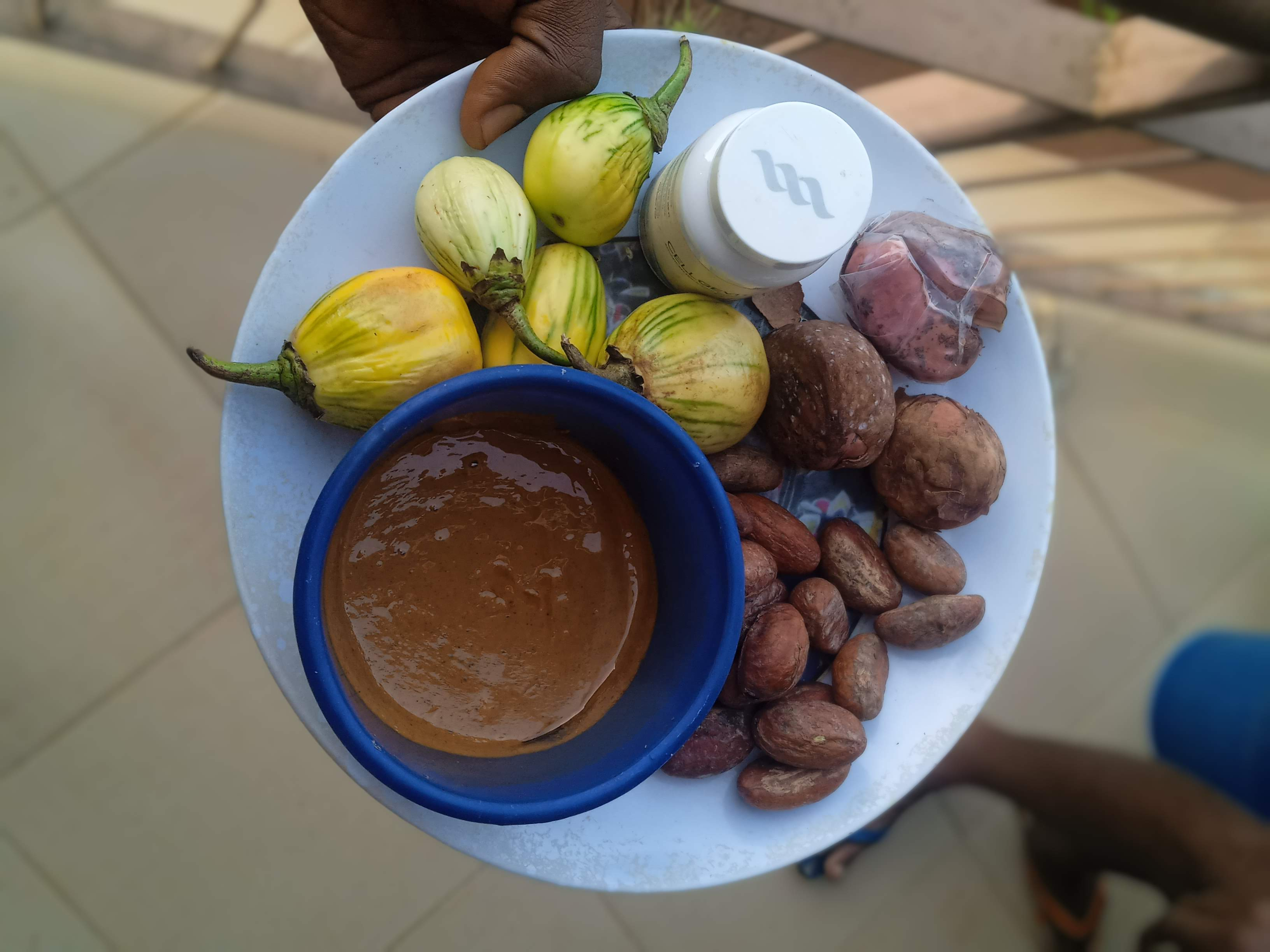
Cultural exhibition. This can be used to welcome visitors to your home in Igboland, Nigeria.

=== Ijaw culture ===
The Ijaw people are said to be a collection of people that are native to the Niger Delta area in Nigeria. Owing to the affinity they have with water, a significant number of the Ijaw people are discovered as migrant fishermen in camps that are as far west as Sierra Leone and as far east as Gabon. With a population of about 4 million, the Ijaws inhabit the Niger Delta section and they make up about 1.8% of Nigeria's population. From a historical perspective, it is almost impossible to give a precise and accurate account as to when and where the Ijaws originated; numerous different accounts have been given by many historians regarding this issue, but what is certain is that the Ijaws are one of the world's most ancient peoples. The Ijaw people are said by some to be the descendants of the autochthonous people of Africa known as the (H)oru. The Ijaws were originally known by this name (Oru); at least it was what their immediate neighbours assumed them to be. Although this was a very long time ago, the Ijaws have, however, kept the ancient language and culture of the Orus. Being the first to find a settlement in the Lower Niger and Niger Delta, it is possible that they may have started inhabiting this region as far back as 500 BC.

Language and cultural studies suggest that they are related to the founders of the Nile Valley civilization complex (and possibly the Lake Chad complex). They immigrated to West Africa from the Nile Valley during antiquity. The Ijaw culture of the South has been influenced greatly by its location on the coast and the interaction with foreigners that it necessitated. Its members amassed great wealth while serving as middlemen, and the preponderance of English names among them today is a testament to the trade names adopted by their ancestors at this time.

=== Yoruba culture ===
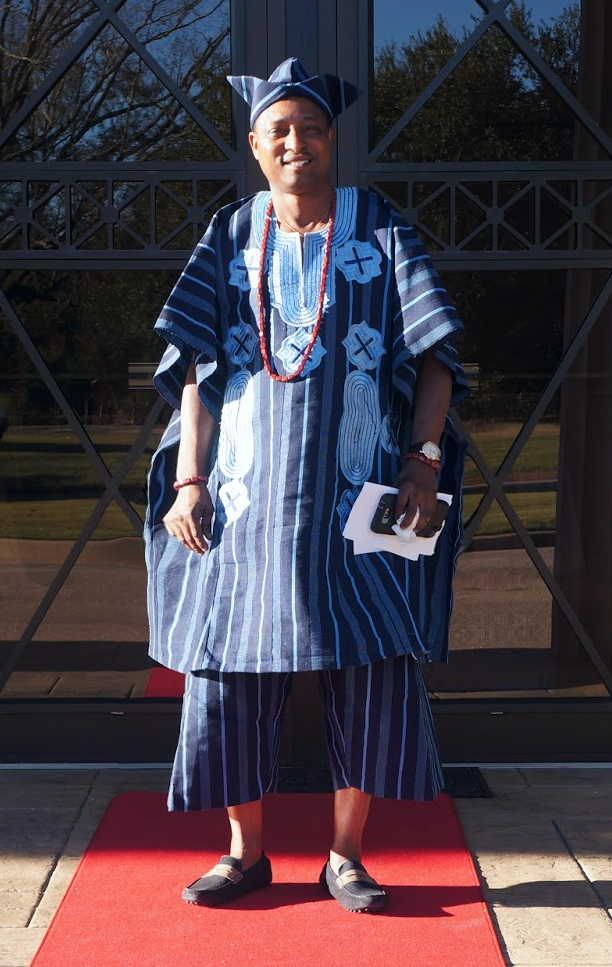
Yoruba man in traditional attire

The Yoruba people are said to be one of the three largest ethnic groups in Nigeria, alongside the Igbo and the Hausa-Fulani peoples. They are concentrated in the southwestern section of Nigeria, much smaller and scattered groups of Yoruba people live in Benin and northern Togo and they are numbered to be more than 20 million at the turn of the 21st century. The Yoruba people have always shared a common language called the Yoruba language and have had the same culture for hundreds of years now, but historically they were less likely to be a single political unit prior to the colonial period. The Yoruba people are believed to have migrated from the east to their present lands west of the lower Niger River more than a millennium ago. They eventually became the most urbanized Africans of precolonial times. The Yoruba people eventually formed many kingdoms of various sizes, each of which was centered on a capital city or town and was ruled by a hereditary king known as an Oba. Their towns eventually became more and more populated and grew into the present-day cities of Oyo, Ile-Ife, Ilesha, Ibadan, Ilorin, Ijebu-Ode, Ikere-Ekiti, and others. Oyo developed in the medieval and early modern periods into the largest of the Yoruba kingdoms, while Ile-Ife still remained a town of very strong religious significance as the site of the earth's creation according to Yoruba mythology. Oyo and the other kingdoms declined in the late 18th and 19th centuries owing to disputes among minor Yoruba rulers and invasions by the Fon of Dahomey (now Benin Republic) and the Muslim Fula. The traditional Yoruba kingships still survive, but with only a hint of their former political power. These monarchs have titled individuals that serve beneath them, with most of this latter group making up the membership of the Ogboni secret society. Their traditional religion, Ifa, has been recognized by UNESCO as a masterpiece of the oral tradition of Humanity.

== Nigerian upper class ==
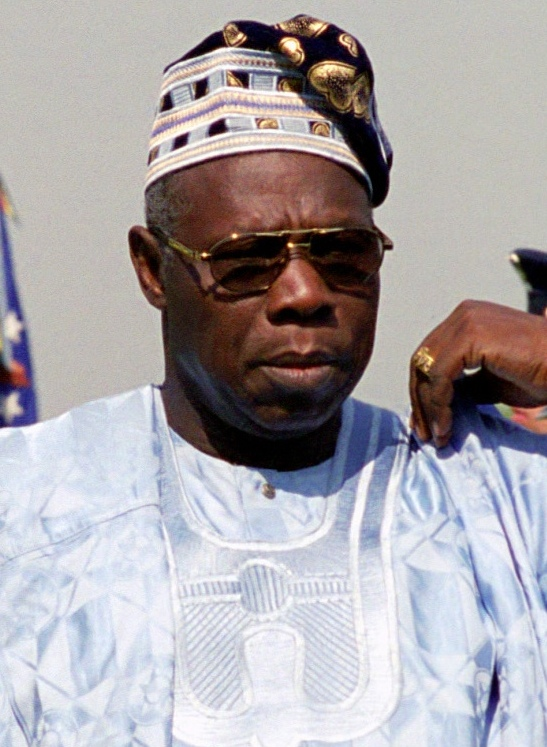
Chief Olusegun Obasanjo

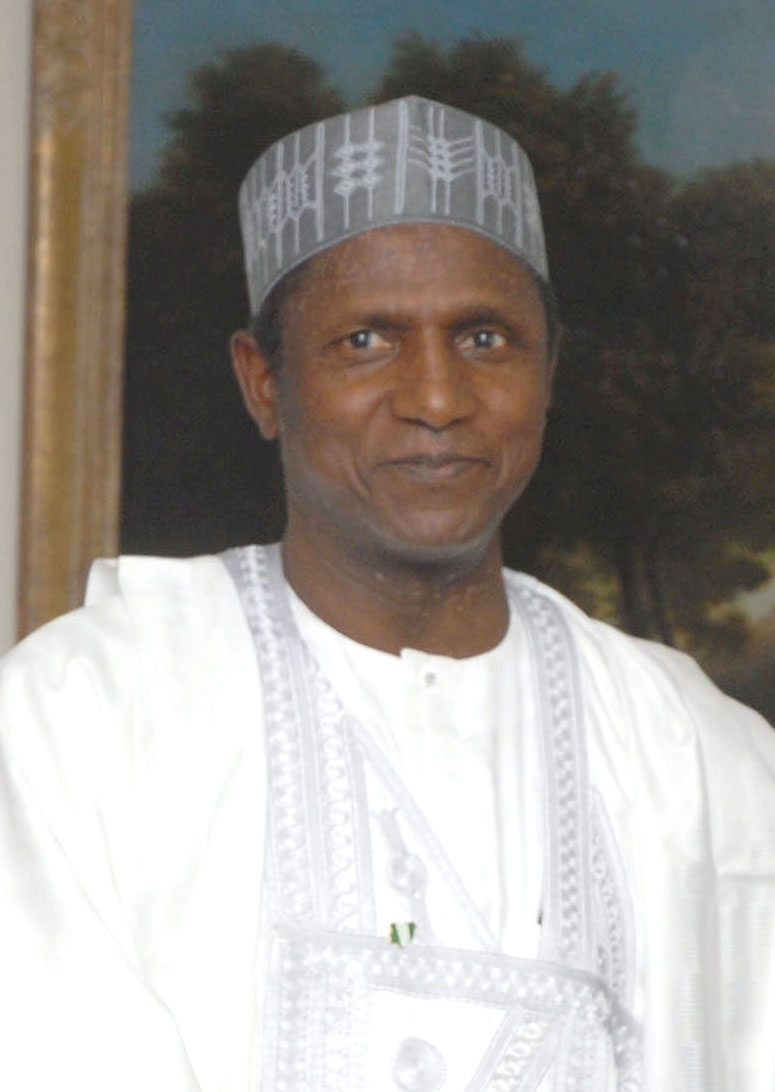
Alhaji Umaru Musa Yar'Adua

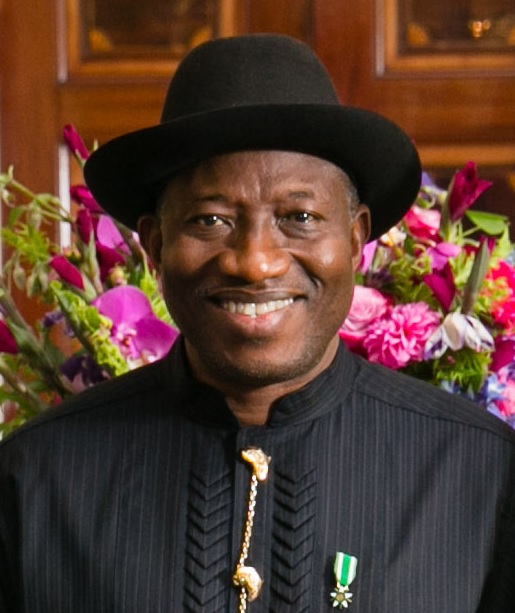
Dr. Goodluck Jonathan

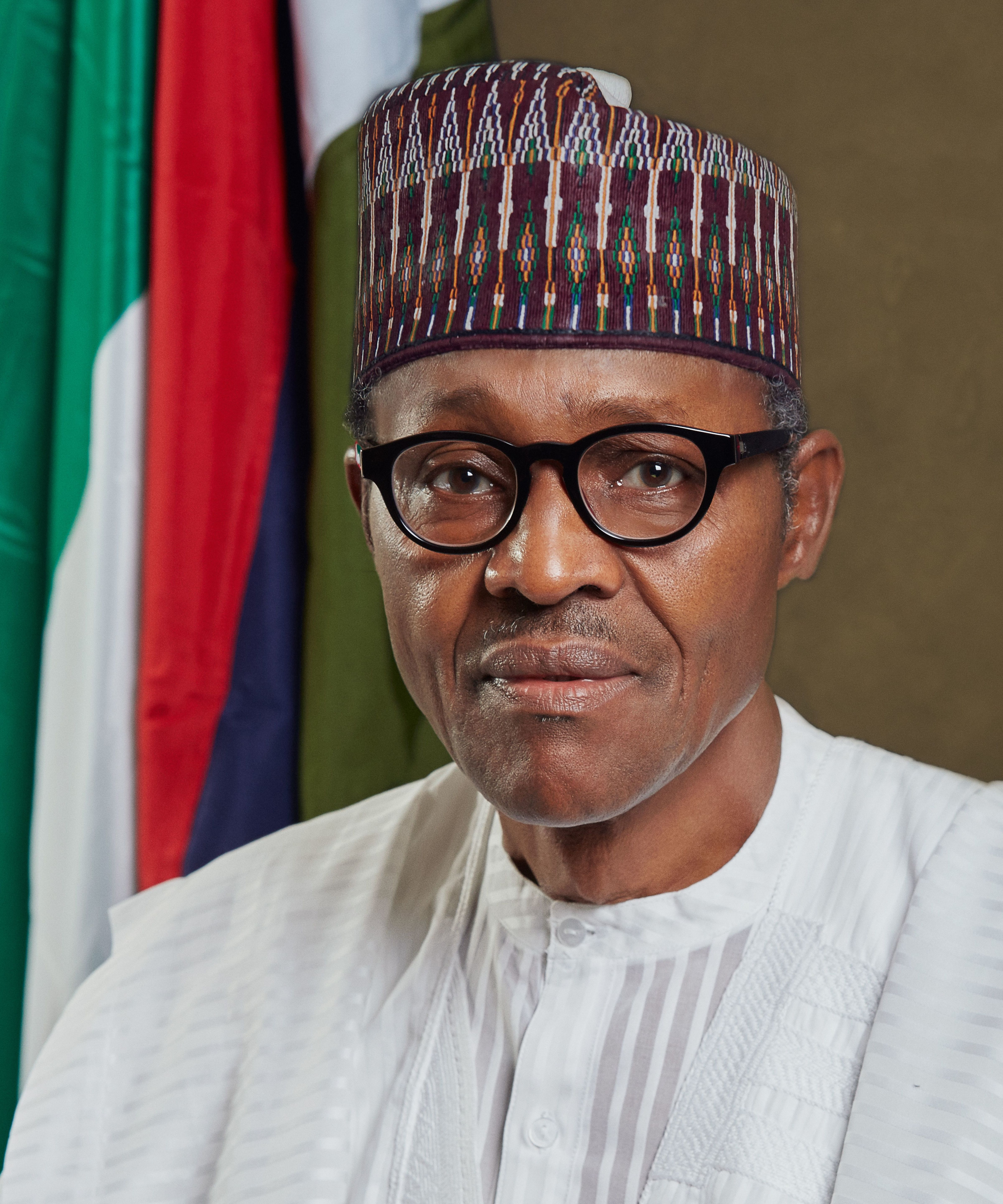
General Muhammadu Buhari

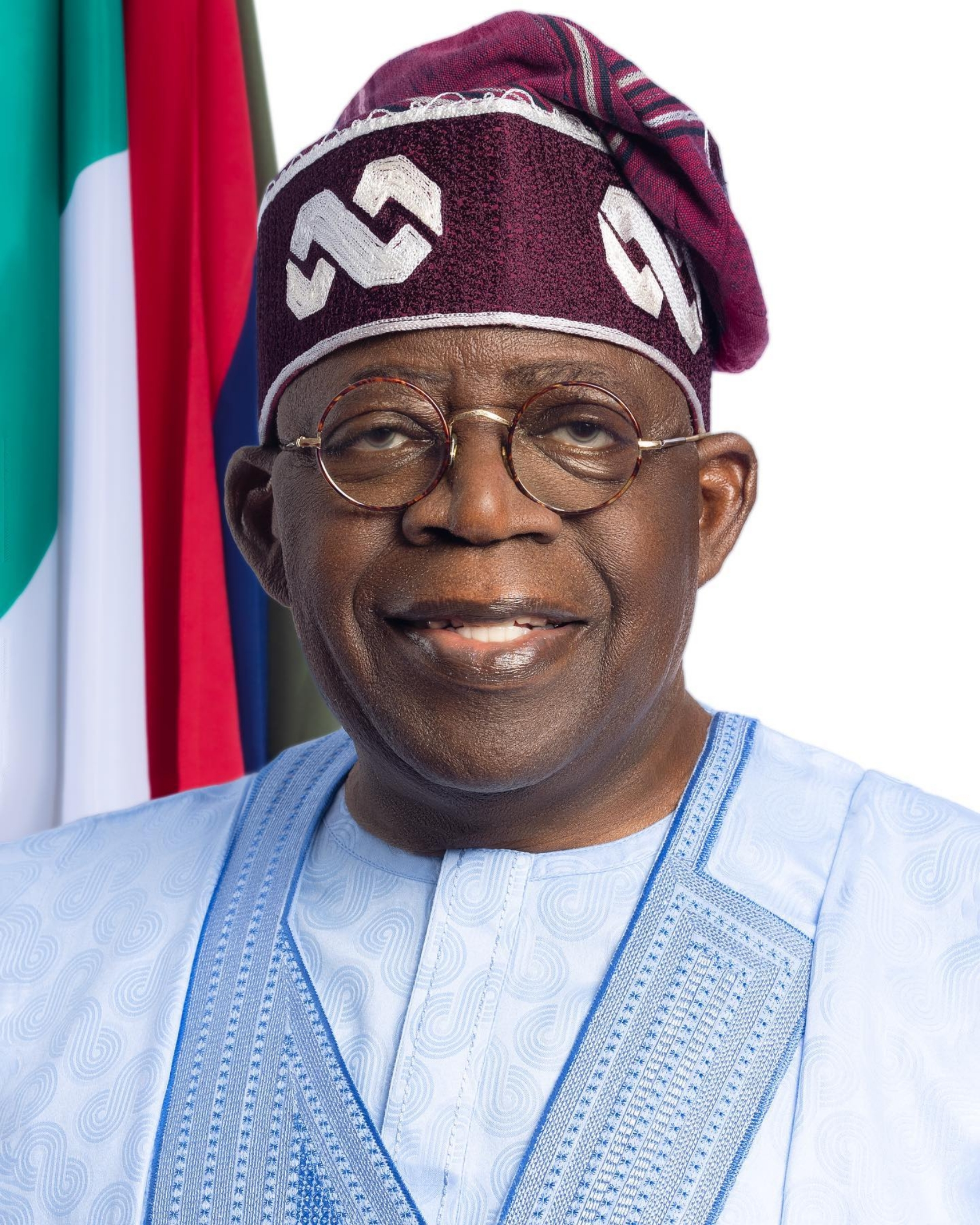
Chief Bola Tinubu

Presidents of Nigeria's current republic, all of whom have been titled chiefs of various ethnic groups

Ever since the country's earliest centralization - under the Nokites at a time contemporaneous to the birth of Jesus Christ - Nigeria has been ruled by a class of titled potentates that are known as chiefs. Led by the Nigerian traditional rulers (i.e. monarchs who have received definite authority from the official government and are recognized by the laws of Nigeria), the chiefs come in various ranks and are of varied kinds - some monarchs are so powerful that they influence political and religious life outside their immediate domains (the Sultan of Sokoto and the Ooni of Ife, for example), while in contrast many local families around the country install their eldest members as titled chiefs in order for them to provide them with what is an essentially titular leadership.

Although chiefs have few official powers today, they are widely respected, and prominent monarchs are often courted to endorse politicians during elections in the hopes of them conferring legitimacy to their campaigns by way of doing so. Successful Nigerians, such as businessmen and the said politicians, typically themselves aspire to the holding of chieftaincies, and the monarchs' control of the honours system that provides them serves as an important royal asset.

== Literature ==
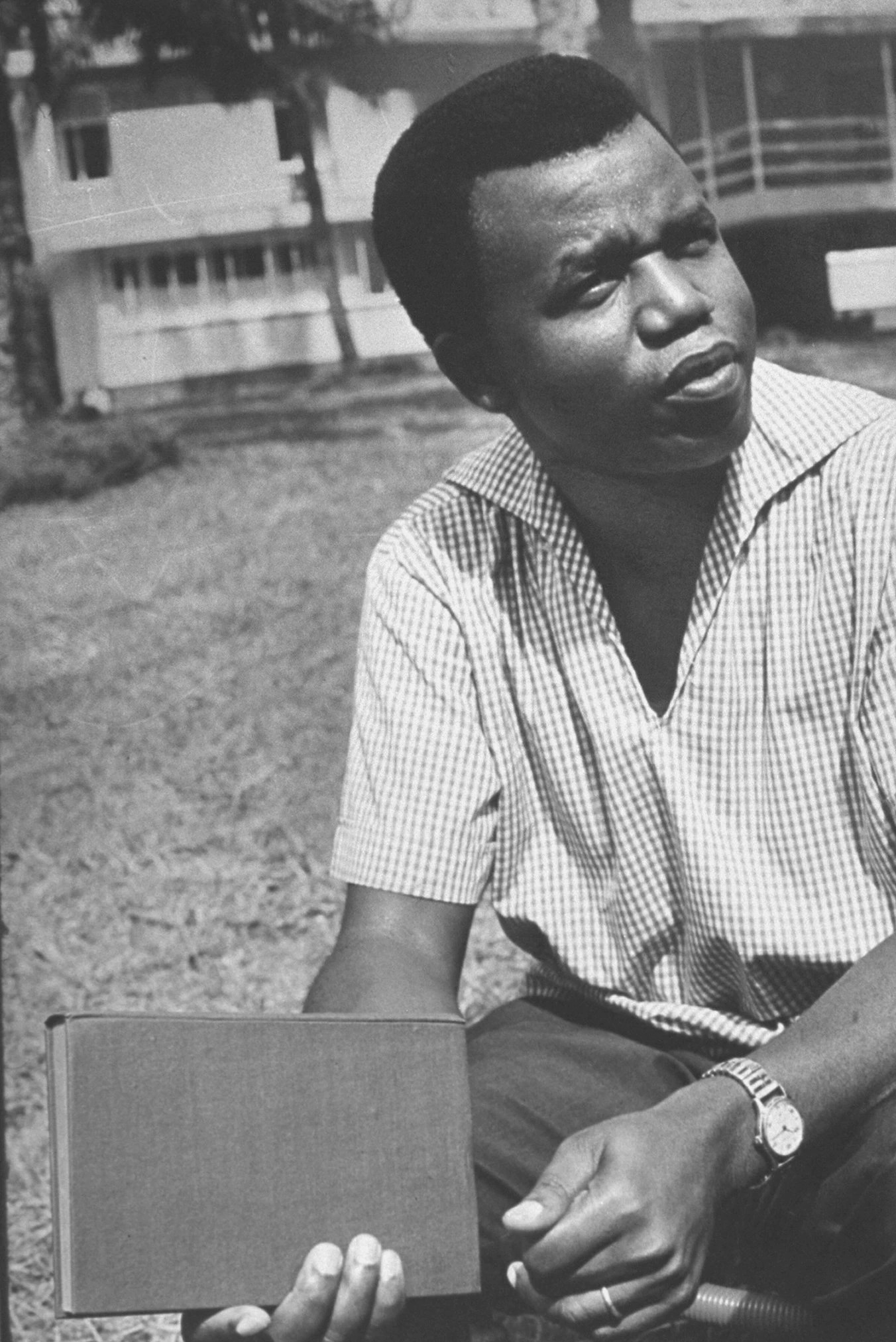
Chinua Achebe, a Booker prize-winning author

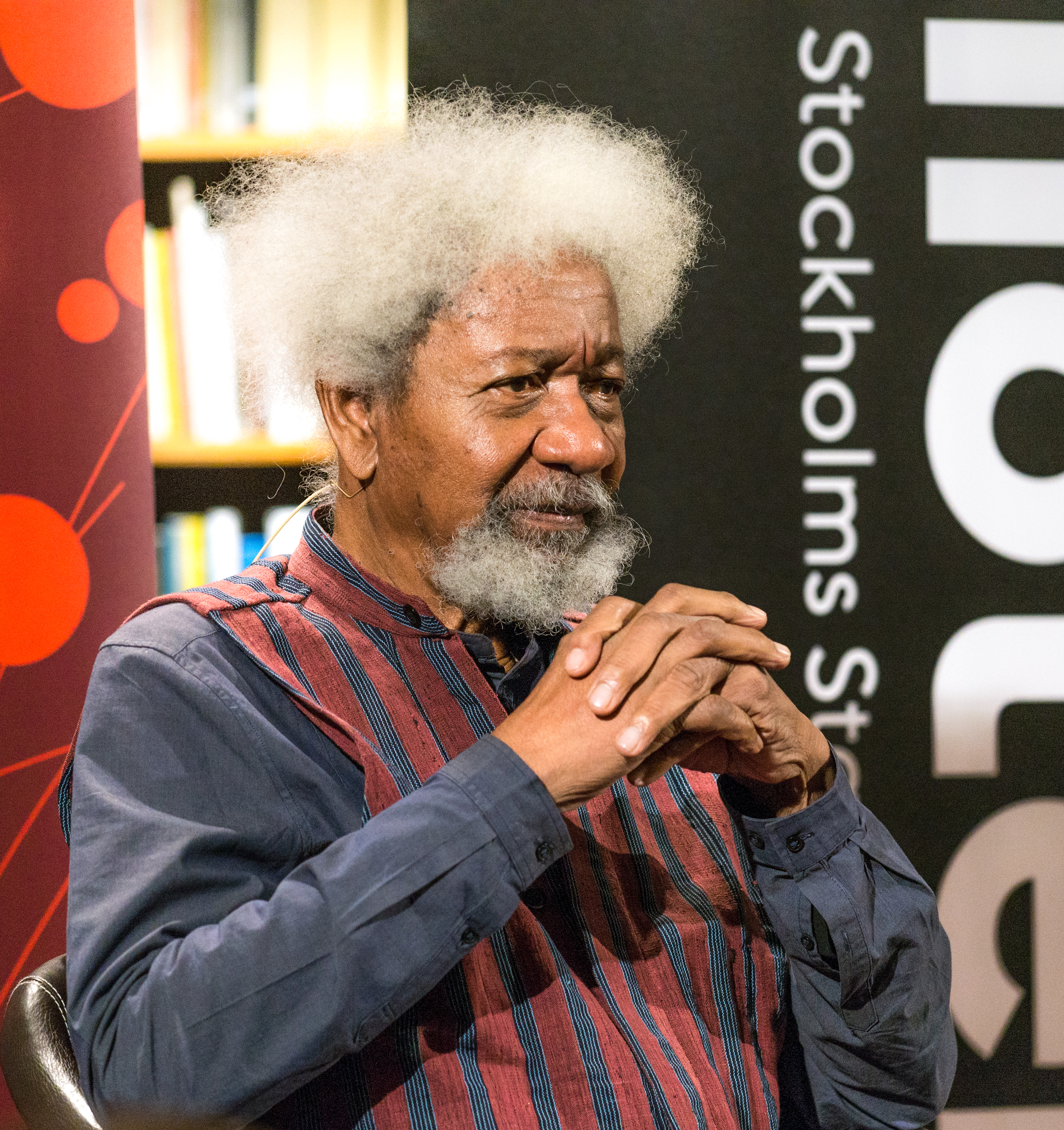
Wole Soyinka, a Nobel Laureate in Literature

Nigeria is famous for its English language literature. Things Fall Apart, by Chinua Achebe, is an important book in African literature. With over eight million copies sold worldwide, it has been translated into 50 languages, making Achebe the most translated African writer of all time.

Nigerian Nobel laureate —Wole Soyinka described the work as "the first novel in English which spoke from the interior of the African character, rather than portraying the African as an exotic, as the white man would see him." Nigeria has other notable writers of English language literature. These include Femi Osofisan, whose first published novel, Kolera Kolej, was produced in 1975; Ben Okri, whose first work, The Famished Road, was published in 1991, and Buchi Emecheta, who wrote stories drawn from her personal experiences of gender inequity that promote viewing women through a single prism of the ability to marry and have children. Helon Habila, Sefi Atta, Flora Nwapa, Iquo DianaAbasi. Zaynab Alkali and Chimamanda Ngozi Adichie, among others, are notable Nigerian authors whose works are read widely within and outside the country.

Apart from the speakers of standard English, a large portion of the population, roughly a third, speaks Nigerian pidgin, which has a primarily English lexicon. It has become a common lingua franca as a result. Pidgin English is a creolized form of the language. For instance, "How you dey" means "How are you". The Palm Wine Drinkard, a popular novel by Amos Tutuola, was written in it.

== Film ==
Since the 1990s the Nigerian movie industry, sometimes called "Nollywood", has emerged as a fast-growing cultural force all over Africa. Vast wealth has been generated by it, and it is currently the second-largest film industry in the world by output.

Because of the movies, western influences such as music, casual dressing and methods of speaking are to be found all across Nigeria, even in the highly conservative north of the country.

== Sports ==
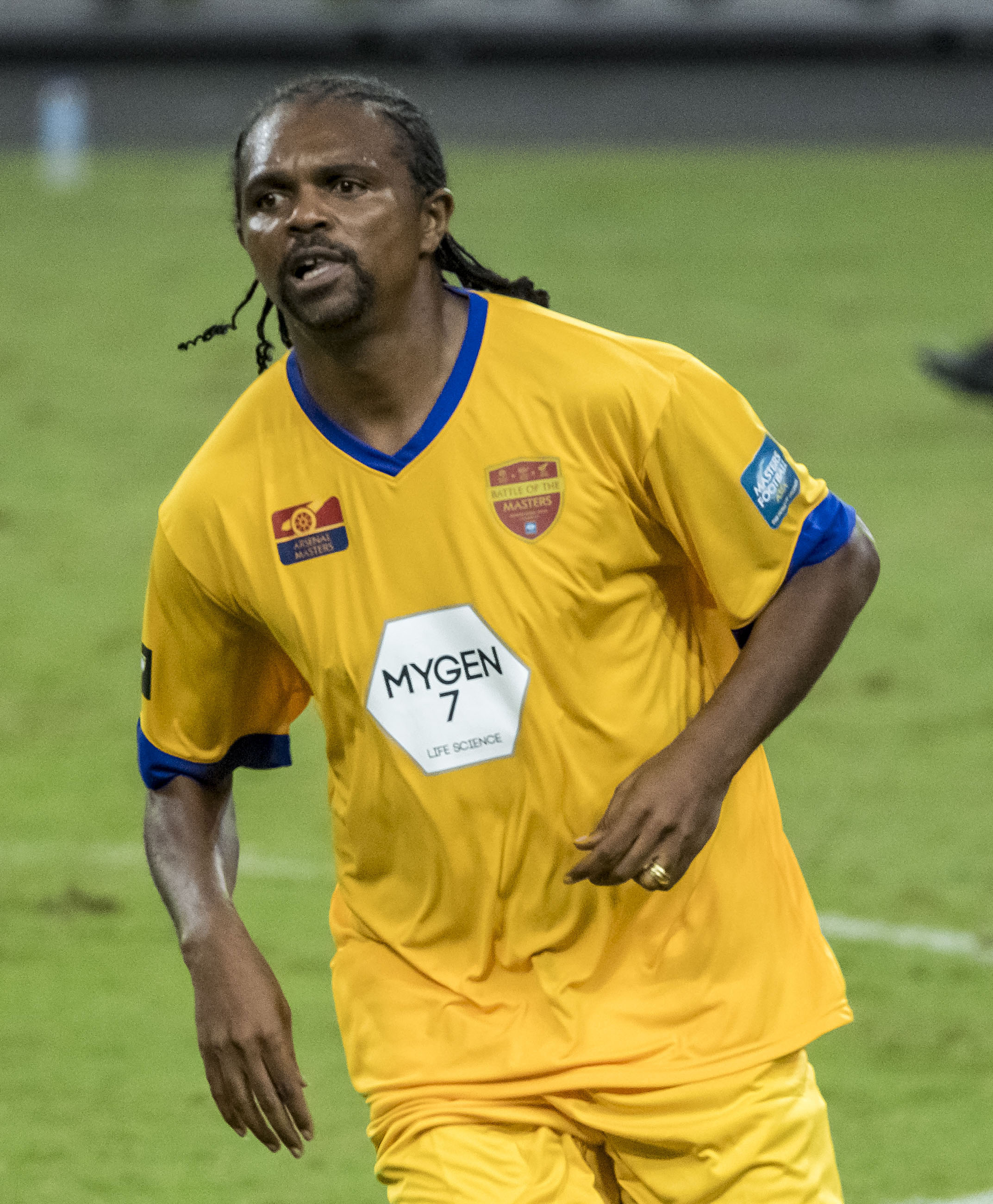
Nwankwo Kanu, an Olympic gold medallist and one of the country's most famous footballers

The Nigerian national football team, nicknamed the "Super Eagles", is the national team of Nigeria, run by the Nigeria Football Federation (NFF). According to the FIFA World Rankings, Nigeria ranks 42nd and holds the sixth-highest place among the African nations. The highest position Nigeria ever reached on the ranking was 5th, in April 1994.

Supporters of English football clubs like Manchester United, Arsenal, Manchester City, Liverpool and Chelsea often segregate beyond the traditional tribal and even religious divide to share their common cause in Premier League teams.

Other than football, basketball, handball and volleyball are also prominent in the Nigerian sports sector. Indigenous games such as loofball, dambe and ayo also have significant popularity among youths in Nigeria.

Nigeria is the country of origin for the sport Loofball. The game involves two teams of five, a ball, and a net. It is played by tossing the ball over the net to the opposing team's side of the court. After July 2021, the sport has been administered by the LSDI (Loofball Sports Development Initiative).

== Architecture ==
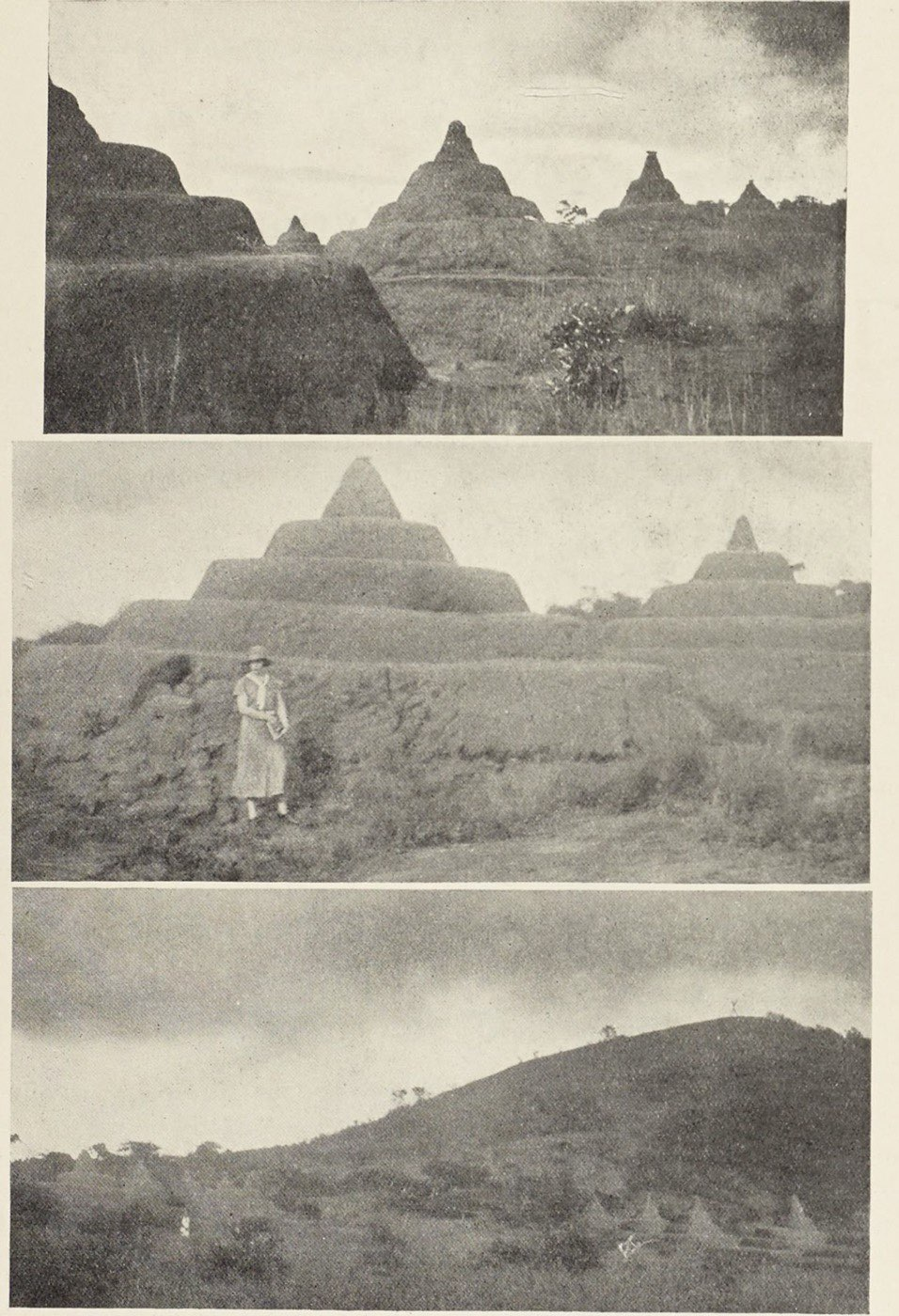
The Nsude pyramids in 1935.

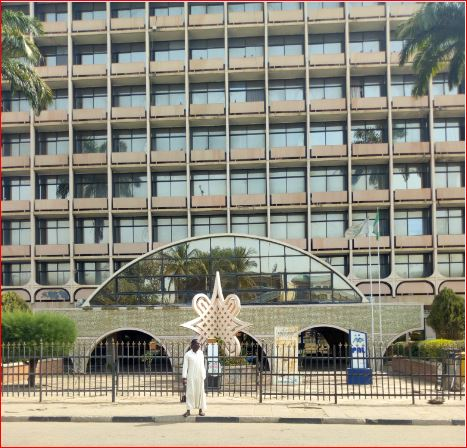
A building in Kaduna State. Over the years a multiplicity of influences, from foreign to local, has had an effect on the architectural traditions of the country.

== Food ==
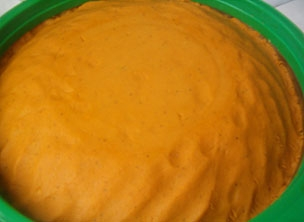
Fufu

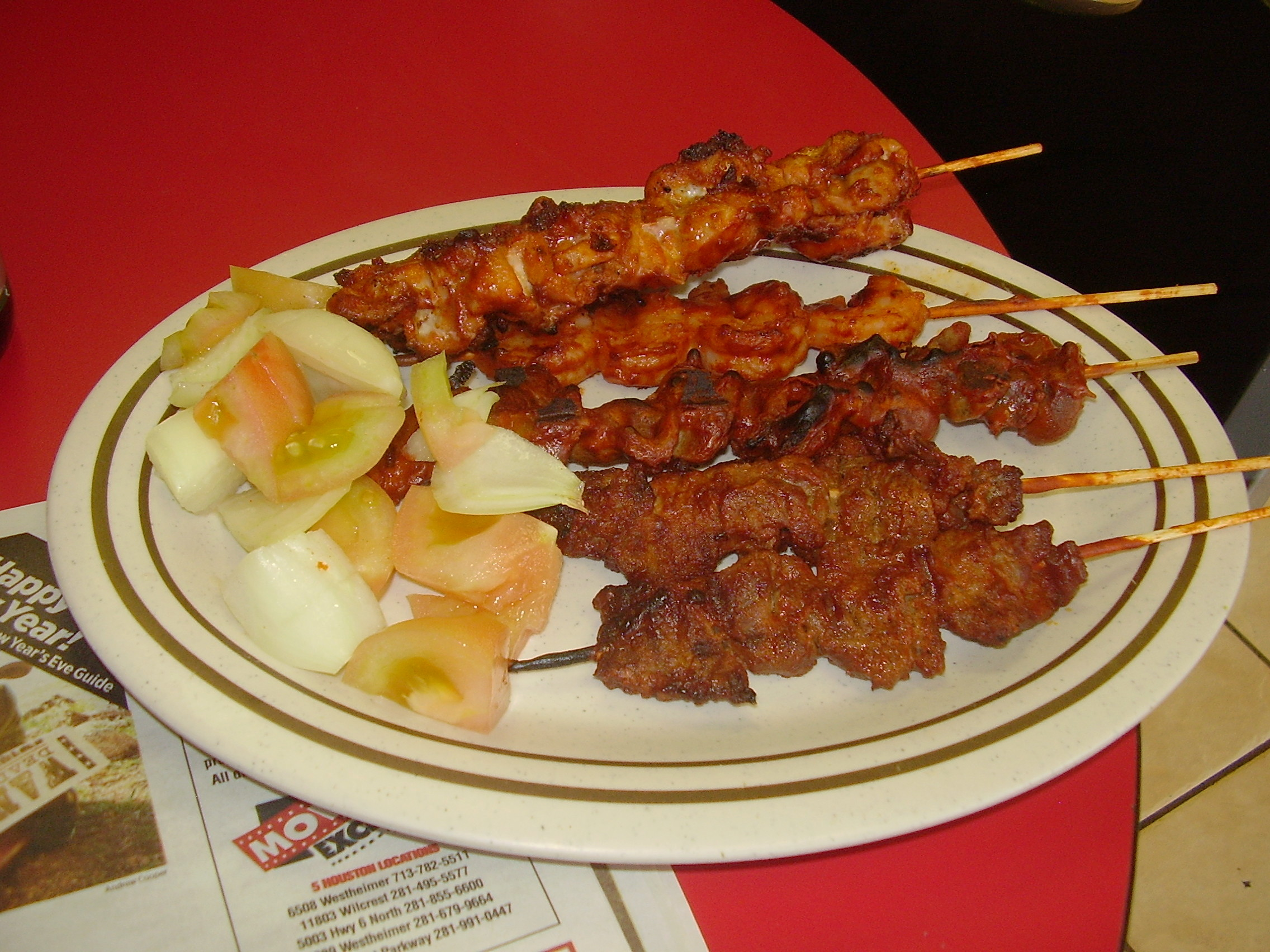
Suya

Nigerian food offers a rich blend of traditionally African carbohydrates such as yam and cassava as well as the vegetable soups with which they are often served. Maize is another crop that is commonly grown in Nigeria. Praised by Nigerians for the strength it gives, garri is "the number one staple carbohydrate food item in Nigeria", a powdered cassava grain that can be readily eaten as a meal and is quite inexpensive. Yams are frequently eaten either fried in oil or pounded to make a mashed potato-like yam pottage. Nigerian beans, quite different from green peas, are widely popular. Meat is also popular and Nigerian suya—a barbecue-like roasted meat—is a well-known delicacy. Bushmeat, meat from wild game like antelope and duikers, is also popular. Fermented palm products make a traditional liquor, palm wine, and also fermented cassava. Nigerian foods are spicy, mostly in the western and southern part of the country, even more so than in Indian cuisine. Other examples of their traditional dishes are eba, pounded yam, iyan, fufu and soups like okra, ogbono and egusi. Fufu is so emblematic of Nigeria that it figures in Chinua Achebe's Things Fall Apart, for example.

Nigeria is known for its many traditional dishes. Each tribe has different dishes that are unique to their culture. Yoruba people, for example, have different dishes like Amala, Ogbono, Moin Moin, Ofada Rice, and Efo Riro.

== Music ==
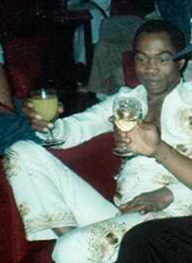
Fela Kuti, a bandleader and multi-instrumentalist, was one of the country's principal makers of popular music. He is now regarded by some as the founding father of Afrobeat.

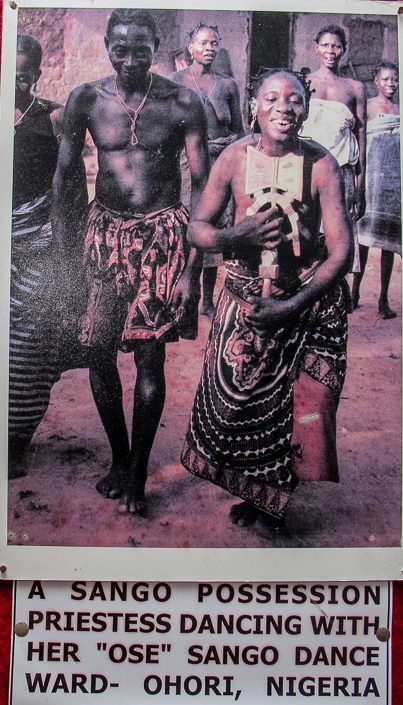
A Sango priestess dancing with a cult servant during a festival

The music of Nigeria includes many kinds of folk and popular music, some of which are known worldwide. The singer and social activist Fela Kuti was instrumental in Nigeria's musical development. His personalized sound, dubbed Afrobeat, is now one of the continent's most widely recognised genres.

Traditional musicians use a number of diverse instruments, such as Gongon drums. The kora and the kakaki are also important.

Other traditional cultural expressions are found in the various masquerades of Nigeria, such as the Eyo masquerades of Lagos, the Ekpe and Ekpo masquerades of the Efik/Ibibio/Annang/Igbo people of the South-South and southeastern Nigeria, and the Northern masquerades of the Bini. The most popular Yoruba manifestations of this custom are the Gelede masquerades.

== Clothing ==
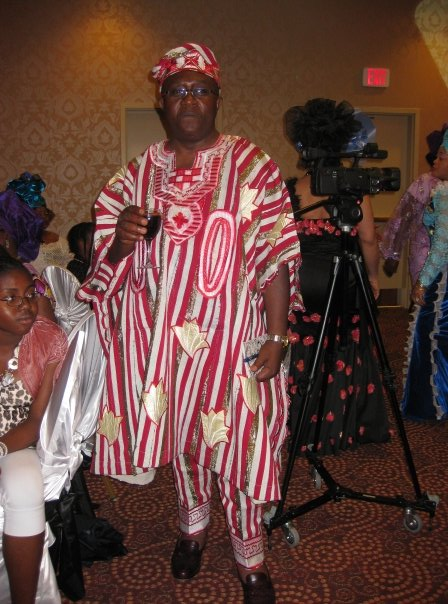
A Nigerian man in Aso Oke

Women wear long flowing robes and headscarves made by local makers who dye and weave the fabric locally. Southern Nigerian women choose to wear western-style clothing. People in urban regions of Nigeria dress in western style, the youth mainly wearing jeans and T-shirts. Other Nigerian men and women typically wear a traditional style called Buba. For men the loose-fitting shirt goes down to halfway down the thigh. For women, the loose-fitting blouse goes down a little below the waist. Other clothing gear includes a gele, which is the woman's headgear. For men their traditional cap is called fila.

Historically, Nigerian fashion incorporated many different types of fabrics. Cotton has been used for over 500 years for fabric-making in Nigeria. Silk (called tsamiya in Hausa, sanyan in Yoruba, and akpa-obubu in Igbo) is also used. Perhaps the most popular fabric used in Nigerian fashion is Dutch wax print, produced in the Netherlands. The import market for this fabric is dominated by the Dutch company Vlisco, which has been selling its Dutch wax print fabric to Nigerians since the late 1800s, when the fabric was sold along the company's oceanic trading route to Indonesia. Since then, Nigerian and African patterns, colour schemes, and motifs have been incorporated into Vlisco's designs to become a staple of the brand.

Nigeria has over 250 ethnic groups and as a result, a wide variety of traditional clothing styles. In the Yoruba tradition, women wear an iro (wrapper), buba (loose shirt) and gele (head-wrap). The men wear buba (long shirt), sokoto (baggy trousers), agbada (flowing robe with wide sleeves) and fila (a hat). In the Igbo tradition, the men's cultural attire is Isiagu (a patterned shirt), which is worn with trousers and the traditional Igbo men's hat called Okpu Agwu. The women wear a puffed sleeved blouse, two wrappers and a headwrap. Hausa men wear barbarigas or kaftans (long flowing gowns) with tall decorated hats. The women wear wrappers and shirts and cover their heads with hijabs (veils).

== Oral tradition ==
Oral traditions in Nigeria are part of a form of human communication in which knowledge, art ideas, and cultural materials are acquired, conserved, and conveyed orally from one generation to another. It is one of the earliest works from Nigeria put into writing and entails several genres of indigenous knowledge production communicated to its adherents verbally. It also encompasses the transmission of historical and artistic information from an initial witness through generation (the information is handled by skilled oral historians).

Traditions have evolved along with the societies and cultures that produced them. Oral traditions in Nigeria have played a very important role in preserving and transmitting historical information and its various functions. Historical information is usually transmitted through speech, songs, folktales, prose, chants, and ballads. Oral traditions in Nigeria are commonly used as a means of keeping the past alive. Among the many oral traditions across Nigeria, the Nupe people's Dzana practice is significant for its role in marking travel, transitions, and social bonding through gift-giving and blessings.

== University culture in Nigeria ==
Grade	Scale	Grade Description	US/EU Grade Equivalent
A	70.00 - 100.00	First Class Honours (5)	A
AB	70.00 - 100.00		A
B	60.00 - 69.99	Second Class Honours, Upper (4)	B+
BC	60.00 - 69.99		B+
C	50.00 - 59.99	Second Class Honours, Lower (3)	B
CD	50.00 - 59.99		B
D	45.00 - 49.99	Third Class (2)	C+
E	40.00 - 44.99	Pass (1)	C
F	0.00 - 39.99		F

Nigerian university campuses includes an array of extracurricular activities and social events such as sports tournaments and talent shows to cultural festivals and academic symposiums, rag days. With some often being hosted by different clubs such as the Rotaract Club, and even religious club groups such as the Christian church youth groups. Nigerian university culture also includes a tradition of student activism and social advocacy.

One of the most known traditional markers of Nigerian university culture is the sign-out day tradition, which is an annual tradition observed in Nigerian universities. Sign-out day is a day for celebrating the last day of the final year session by wearing white clothing. The tradition is celebrated with a white T-shirt or any white shirt worn by a graduating student. The shirts are then to be signed by friends and well-wishers. This tradition marks the culmination of academic studies for graduating students. For university students, this ceremonial event holds significant cultural and social importance within the Nigerian higher education system, symbolizing the completion of undergraduate studies and the transition to the next phase of life.

Despite the numerous challenges facing Nigerian universities, including inadequate funding, violent cult-related confraternities, infrastructure deficiencies, and the occasional strikes, students navigate these obstacles with a different array of resolve. Also the cultural diversity of Nigeria, with its myriad ethnic groups and traditions is reflected on university campuses.

== See also ==
- Festivals in Nigeria
- Gender roles and fluidity in indigenous Nigerian cultures
- List of museums in Nigeria
