= Nupe people =

Ethnic group in Nigeria

- Flag of the Bida Emirate

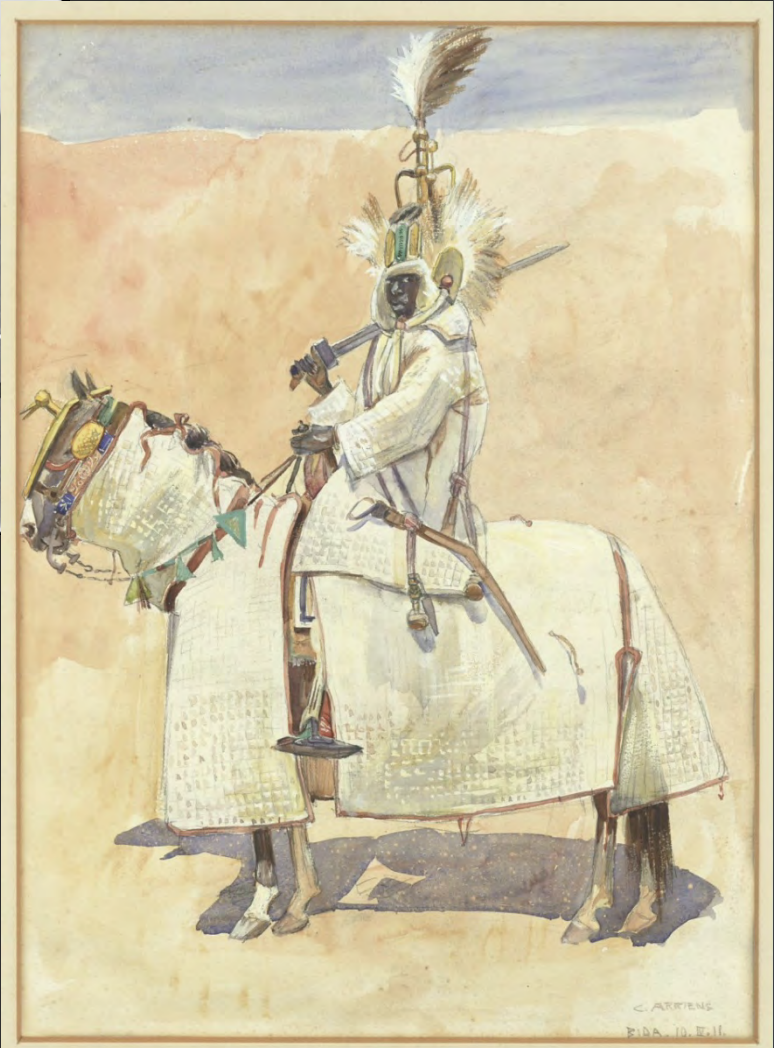
- A Nupe cavalryman wearing lifidi (padded armour). Drawn in 1911 by Carl Arriens.

Total population
- c. 3.5 million

Regions with significant populations
- Nigeria

Languages
- Nupe

Religion
- Predominantly Sunni Islam: Minority Christianity; Traditional African religion

Related ethnic groups
- Gbagyi, Igala, Yoruba, Ebira, Kambari, Kamuku, Bariba, Dukawa

The Nupe (traditionally called the Nufawa by the Hausas and Tapa by the neighbouring Yoruba) are an ethnic group native to North Central Nigeria. They are the dominant ethnic group in Niger State and an important minority in Kwara State. The Nupe are also present in Kogi State and The Federal Capital Territory.

== History ==
The Nupe Kingdom emerged in the 14th-15th century, nestled between the Niger and Kaduna rivers. The Nupe Kingdom was brought about by conquest, with Igala leader Tsoede taking on the title of Etsu (king) and uniting neighboring tribes by conquest. The Etsu Jibiri adopted Islam around 1770, due to the Fulani's conquest coming from the north. The late 18th century and early 19th century was a period marked by instability, with two Etsus, Jimanda and Majiya II, competing for the throne in the 1790s, and the continued Fulani conquest in the 1820s. By the end of the 19th century, the area was under British colonial control by way of the Royal Niger Company, and became part of modern Nigeria with Nigerian independence in 1960.

Today, the Nupe people speak over 5 dialects: Central Nupe, Nupe Tako/Bassa-Nge, Kupa, Kakanda, and Dibo/Abawa/Gana-Gana. Nupe is the largest ethnic group in the North Central, they are at the heart of Nigerian art and culture. The proximity of Nupe to the Yoruba Igbomina people in the south and to the Yoruba Oyo people in the southwest led to cross-fertilization of cultural influences through trade and conflicts over the centuries. In his book The Negro, African-American scholar W.E.B. Du Bois wrote that Nupe trade may have extended as far as Sofala and the Byzantine Empire, with the latter of which, according to what he termed "credible legend", there was even an exchange of embassies.

== Population and demography ==
There are probably about 4.5 million Nupes, principally in Niger State. The Nupe language is also spoken in Kwara, Kogi and Federal Capital Territory. They are primarily Muslims, with some Christians and followers of African Traditional Religion. The Nupe people have several local traditional rulers. The Etsu Nupe (Bida) is not pure Nupe, his great-grandfather from his father's side is Fulani, while the family of his mother was completely Nupe. His great-grandfather from his father's side came to Rabba then later Bida in 1806 during the Sokoto jihad.

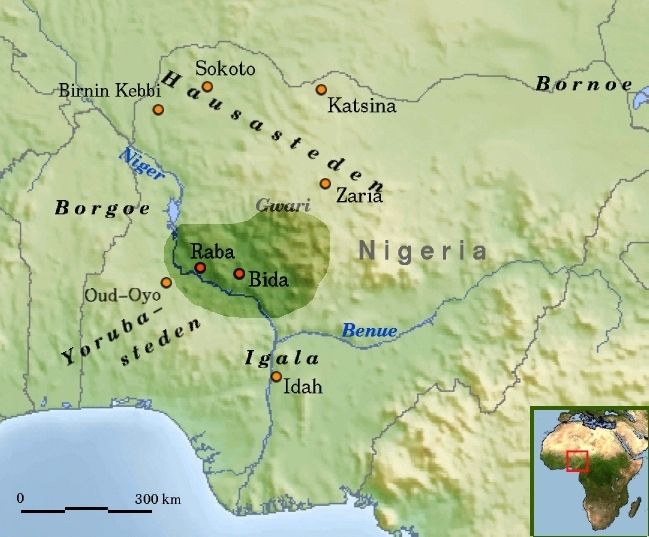
Nupe part in Nigeria

== Traditions, art and culture ==
The Nupe people maintain a cultural heritage rooted in oral traditions. These spoken narratives have preserved practices such as Dzana, a "multifaceted cultural gesture involving the giving of gifts, blessings, or symbolic items primarily in the context of travel, transitions, and relational expressions of care".

Many practices have changed as a result of the movements started by Sokoto jihad of the 19th century, but they still hold on to some of their culture. Many Nupe people often have tribal marks on their faces, some to identify their prestige and the family of which they belong as well as for protection, and adornment as jewellery. However, these traditions are dying out in certain areas.

Their art is often abstract. They are well known for their wooden stools with patterns carved onto the surface.

The Nupe were described in detail by the ethnographer Siegfried Nadel, whose book, Black Byzantium, remains an anthropological classic.

=== Examples of Nupe art ===
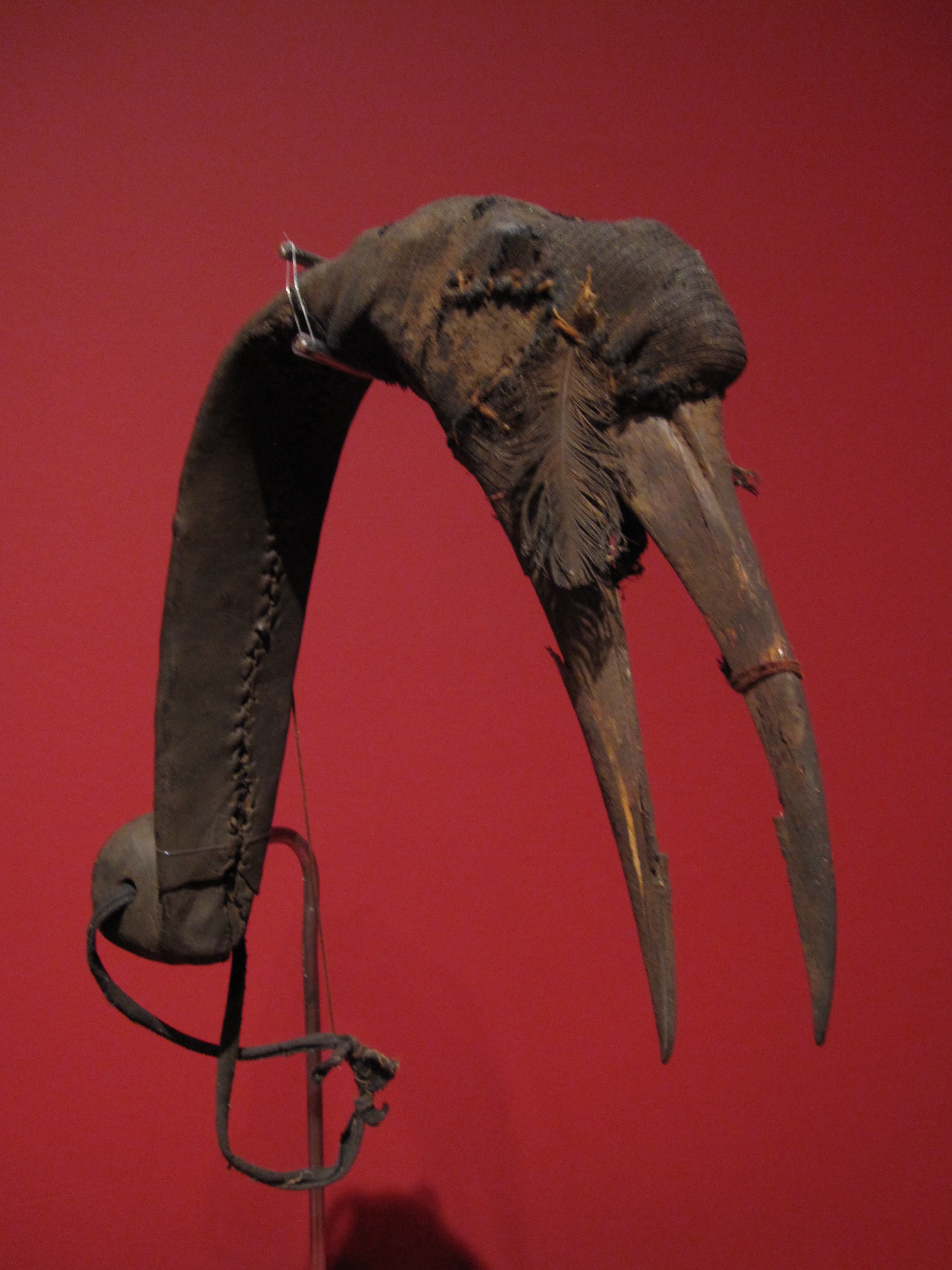
Burtu wooden mask, used during bird hunting; Museum of Ethnology, Vienna. The hunter would tie the mask around his head and imitate the bird's movement.

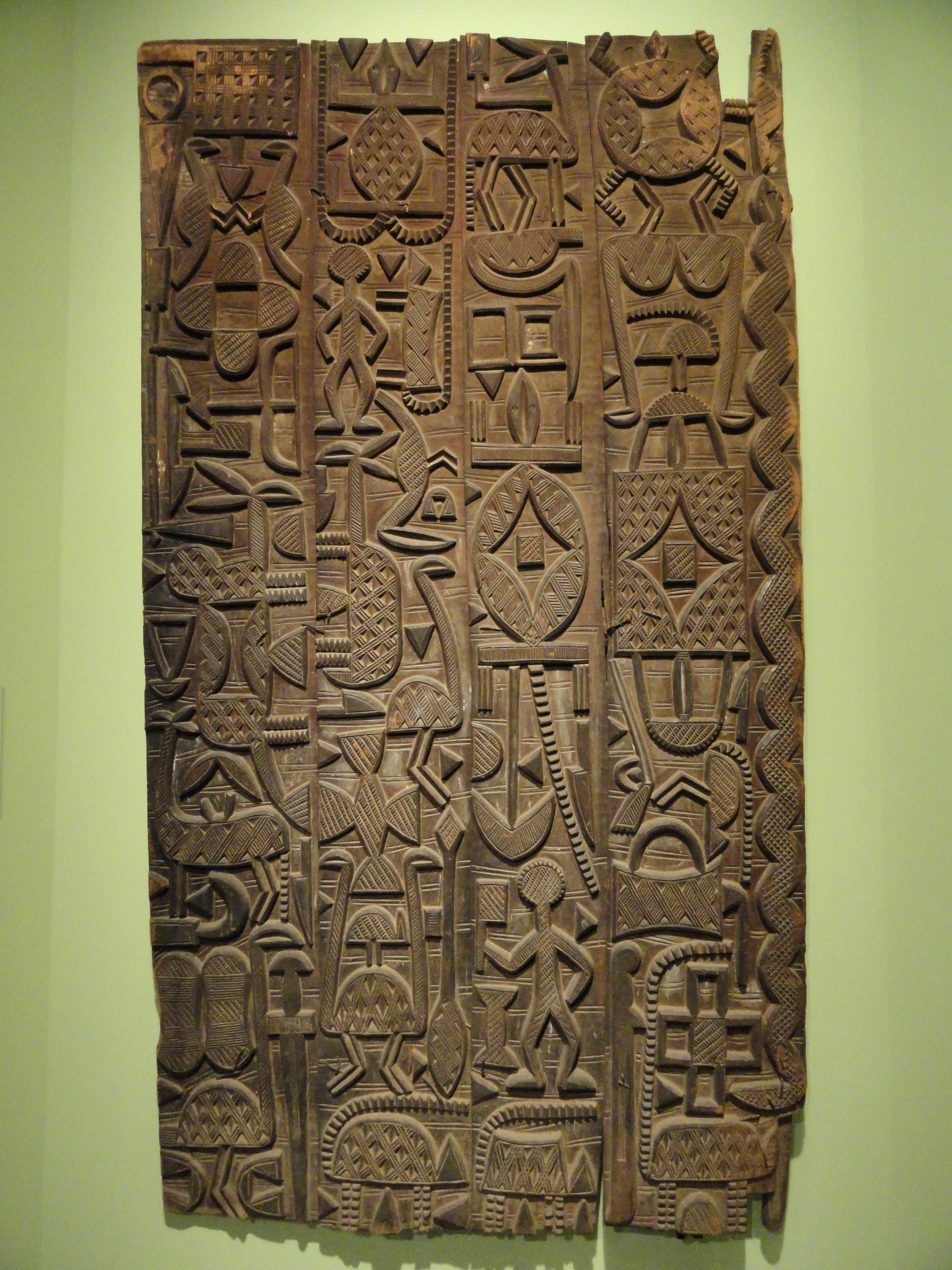
Carved door; c. 1920 – 1940; wood with iron staples; Hood Museum of Art.

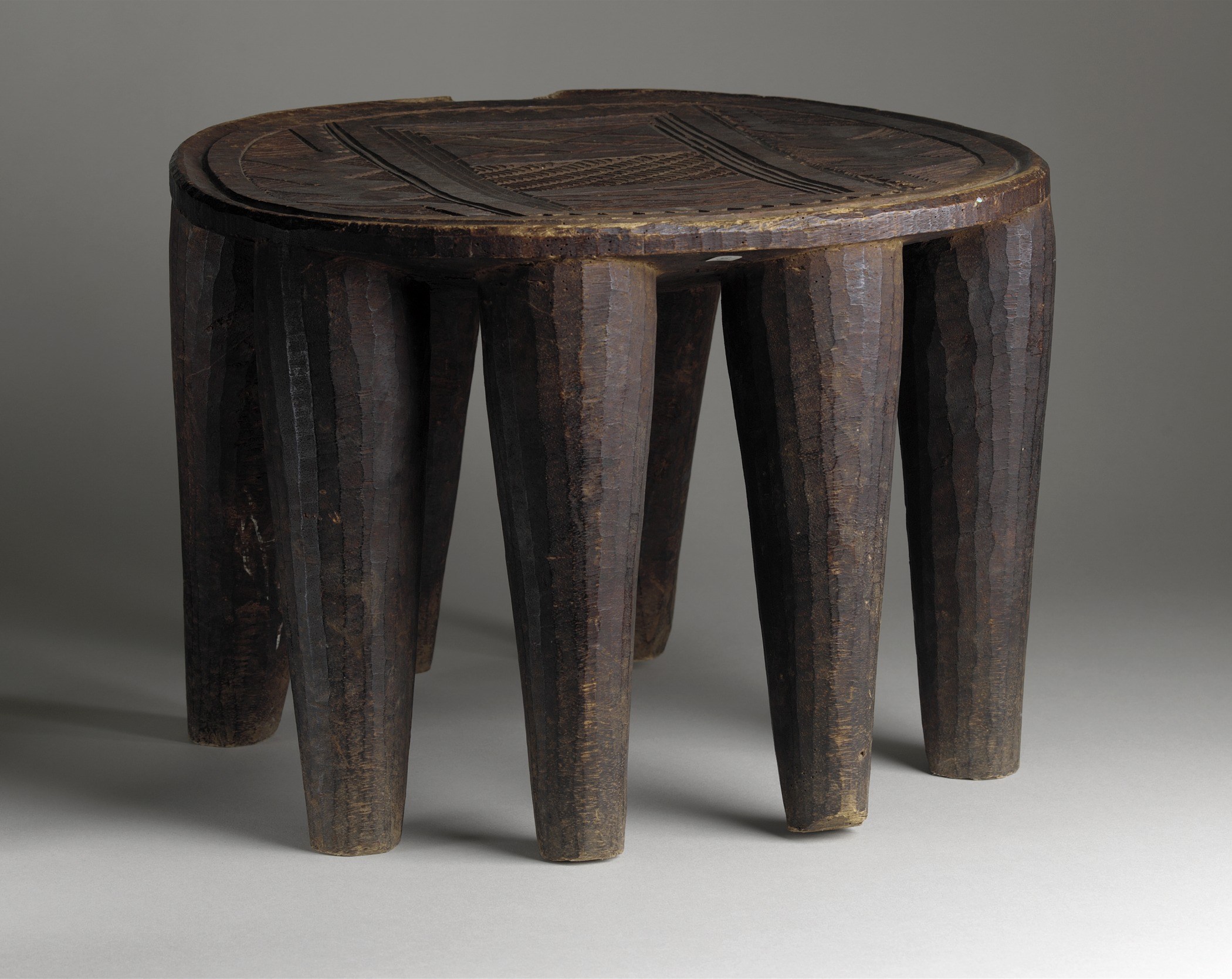
Wooden oval stool with incised carving; Los Angeles County Museum of Art.

== Music and entertainment industry ==
Nupe traditional music is sung by the Ningba, or musician(s), while the Enyanicizhi beats the drum. Legendary Nupe singers of memory include Hajiya Fatima Lolo Alhaji Nda'asabe, Hajiya Nnadzwa, Hauwa Kulu, Baba-Mini, Ahmed Shata and Ndako Kutigi.

The prime-movers of the Nupe cinema started film-making since the late 1990s into the early 2000s. Great Nupe personalities that birthed the idea of producing, acting and directing Nupe dramas/comedies on-screen are late Sadisu Muhammad DGN, Prince Ahmed Chado, late Prince Hussaini Kodo, M.B. Yahaya Babs and Jibril Bala Jibril. They are the people who made the move for Nupe dramas to be on-screen and are the founders of the modern-day Nupe film industry known as Nupewood. Nupewood has since produced more than a thousand entertaining movies in Nupe space to the millions of Nupe audiences.

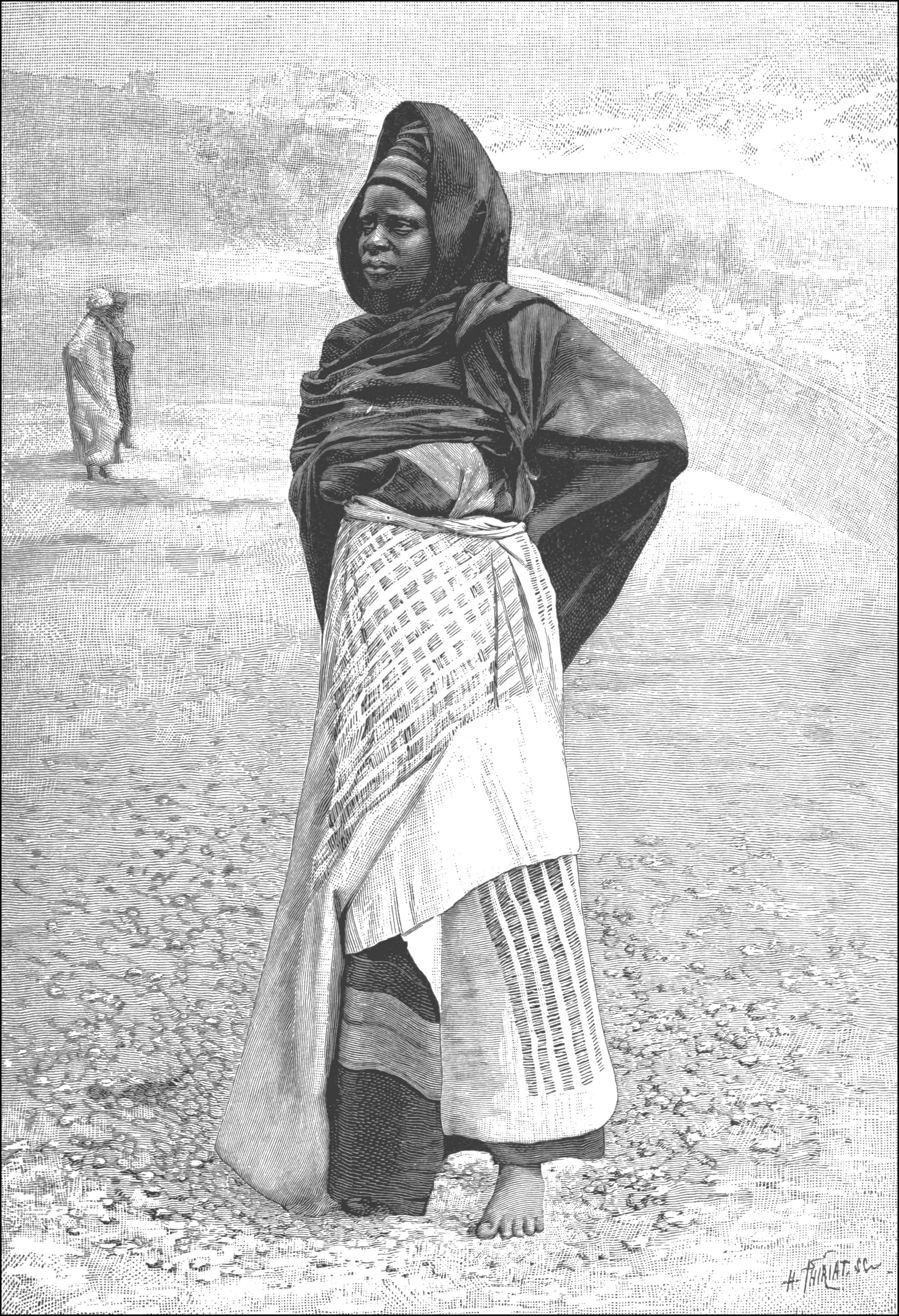
Nupé Woman (1888) by Élisée Reclus

- Shaikh Ahmad Lemu (OON, OFR) (1929–2020), Islamic scholar
- Hon. Justice Idris Legbo Kutigi (OFR, GCON) (1939–2018), Nigerian lawyer and chief justice of the Supreme Court of Nigeria
- Mohammed Umar Bago (born 1974), politician, Governor of Niger State since 29 May 2023
- Muhammad Bima Enagi (born 1959), politician
- Muhammad Umaru Ndagi, academic professor (born 1964)
- Shehu Ahmadu Musa (1935–2008), politician
- Dangana Ndayako, politician and Senator in the Third Nigerian Republic
- Shaaba Lafiaji, politician
- Suleiman Takuma, journalist and political leader (1934–2001)
- Sam Nda-Isaiah (1962–2020), political columnist
- Jerry Gana, scholar and politician. See cabinet of Olusegun Obasanjo
- Isa Mohammed Bagudu (born 1948), third republic politician
- Zainab Kure (born 1959), politician
- Abdulkadir Kure (1956–2017), politician and former Governor of Niger State in the Fourth Nigerian Republic
- Aliyu Makama (1905–1980), Northern acting premiere
- Alhaji Yahaya Abubakar (GCFR) (born 1952), Etsu-Nupe; traditional ruler
- Mamman Jiya Vatsa (1940–1986), intellectual, military officer and former FCT minister
- Fatima Lolo (1891–1997), musician
- Mohammed Baba Saba (1984 - 2024), Plant breeder
- Abd al-Rahman Tsatsa (c. 1756 – c.1829), Islamic scholar and jihadist
- Ibrahim Chatta

== Sources ==
- Blench, R. M. (1984), "Islam among the Nupe." Muslim peoples. (edn 2), Boulder, Colorado: Westview Press.
- Forde, D. (1955), "The Nupe". pp. 17–52 in Peoples of the Niger-Benue Confluence. London: IAI.
- Ibrahim, Saidu (1992), The Nupe and their neighbours from the 14th century. Ibadan: Heinemann Educational Books.
- Madugu, George I. (1971), "The a construction in Nupe: Perfective, Stative, Causative or Instrumental". In Kim, C-W., & Stahlke, H., Papers in African Linguistics, I, pp. 81–100. Linguistic Research Institute, Champaign.
- Nadel, S. F. (2018) [1954]. Nupe Religion. African Ethnographic Studies of the 20th Century (eBook ed.). London & New York: Routledge. doi:10.4324/9780429487446. ISBN 9780429487446. S2CID 240282086.
- Perani, J. M. (1977), Nupe crafts; the dynamics of change in nineteenth and twentieth century weaving and brassworking. Ph.D. Fine Arts, Indiana University.
- Stevens, P. (1966), Nupe woodcarving. Nigeria, 88:21–35.
- Yahaya, Mohammed Kuta, The Nupe People of Nigeria. Nigeria, 95:1–2
