= Dzana =

Dzana is a sacred cultural tradition among the Nupe people of Nigeria, historically transmitted through oral traditions since at least the 15th century, during the era of the Nupe Kingdom. Dzana is a multifaceted cultural gesture involving the giving of gifts, blessings, or symbolic items primarily in the context of travel, transitions, and relational expressions of care.

Until recently, Dzana had not been formally documented in scholarly literature. According to the 2025 study by the Nupe Heritage Cekpa Project (NHCP), this publication represents the first comprehensive scholarly documentation of the Dzana tradition, which had been preserved primarily through oral transmission. The study, titled Dzana Practice in Nupe Culture as a Legacy of Love, Blessing, and Intergenerational Bonding, was created through collaborative oral history research involving over 30 Nupe elders, youth, and researchers.

== Underrepresentation of Nupe oral traditions in documentation ==
Oral tradition in Nigeria, as in many African cultures, have historically played a crucial role in preserving cultural heritage, social values, and historical knowledge. However, scholarly literature and official documentation often underrepresent these traditions due to the dominance of written records and modern communication methods. This has contributed to systemic bias in archival and academic records. According to Eze et al. (2021), the arrival of Western civilization and modern telecommunications led to concerns that African oral arts might become obsolete. Despite this, the study highlights the continued relevance of oral traditions, emphasizing their importance in information dissemination and community cohesion. The coexistence of modern and traditional communication forms is seen as essential for comprehensive cultural preservation and effective communication in contemporary society.

== Documentation and research ==
The NHCP study employed qualitative oral history and oral tradition methodologies, engaging with community elders and youth to document traditional understandings of Dzana. Contributors represented an intergenerational model of cultural preservation, with voices from both senior cultural custodians and younger community members.

Dzana’s emphasis on spiritual blessing, mentorship, and social bonding reflects broader patterns of cultural transmission among the Nupe people. These values are deeply rooted in the Nupe's kinship systems, rites of passage, and community obligations that ensure the preservation and continuity of cultural heritage. Among the many facets of Dzana is the tradition of parting gifts.

The NHCP report also introduces a scholarly framework that acknowledges indigenous epistemologies and oral traditions, including adapted citation practices that emphasize oral sources.

== Importance of Nigerian oral history and oral tradition for Dzana in Nupe culture ==
Documentation of Nupe practices such as Dzana rooted in oral history and oral tradition is important for cultural preservation. The Nupe people of Nigeria uphold a rich oral tradition that forms the foundation for safeguarding history, cultural values, and social practices. Through storytelling, songs, proverbs, and ceremonial performances, Nupe elders and cultural guardians transmit shared memories and ancestral wisdom, fostering cultural preservation across generations. These oral customs are central to the community’s identity and governance, often narrating the origins of the Nupe Kingdom, imparting ethical teachings, and reinforcing social norms. Researchers emphasize that Nupe oral traditions provide critical perspectives on indigenous knowledge systems and the region’s socio-political heritage.
