= Fatima Lolo =

Hajiya Fatima Lolo
- Also known as: Fatima Lolo
- Born: Fatima Muhammadu Kolo; 19 January 1891; Pategi, Royal Niger Company, Colonial Nigeria
- Origin: Northern Region, Nigeria
- Died: 15 May 1997 (aged 106) Niger State
- Genres: Soul, R&B, local singer, Nupe local singer
- Occupations: Traditional singer
- Awards: (MON)

Hajiya Fatima Lolo (MON), (born Fatima Muhammad Kolo in Pategi, Royal Niger Company; 19 January 1891 – 15 May 1997) was a Nigerian singer, songwriter, and historian.

== Early life ==
Lolo married twice and could not bear a child in both marriages. She represented the Nupe Kingdom Emirate in most of their festivals and occasions. Before she became famous, she was notable for singing to farmers and hunters while dancing with a plate on her hand. She was later referred to as Sagi Ningbazi (Queen of Musicians) in Nupe language. She was awarded MON Member of the Order of the Niger by Shehu Shagari.

Lolo died at age 106 on 15 May 1997, after a brief illness.

== Poetry ==
Fatima Lolo was among 33 notable women whose poetry was published in a book.
