= Muhammad Umaru Ndagi =

Academic Professor of Arabic language

M U Ndagi
- Born: 1964 (age 61–62); Agaie, Niger State
- Education: Ahmadu Bello University
- Occupations: Arabic writer and lecturing
- Known for: Arabic writings and literary works
- Notable work: Spectrum Arabic Schools book 1 - 6

Muhammad Umaru Ndagi (born in 1964) is a professor of Arabic Linguistics in the Department of Arabic, University of Abuja, Abuja, Nigeria. He is currently serving as a part time Board Member and Zonal Commissioner representing North Central geo-political zone at the National Hajj Commission of Nigeria (NAHCON). He was appointment as Deputy Vice Chancellor (Administration) of the University of Abuja in February 2026. UniAbuja appoints Prof Ndagi DVC admin

== Early life and education ==
Muhammad Umaru Ndagi (born 1964) is a professor of Arabic Linguistics in the Department of Linguistics and African Languages, University of Abuja, Abuja, Nigeria. He had his early Qur’anic education under his father, Alhaji Umaru Ndagi (d. 1997) who, until his death, was the Imam of Etsu Nuhu mosque at the Etsu Nuhu Palace in Agaie. He attended Central Primary School Agaie, Niger State (1969–1974); College of Arts and Islamic Studies, Minna Nigeria, Niger State (1974–1979) where he obtained Teachers' Grade II Certificate. He earned a B.Ed. (Hons) degree in Islamic Studies from the Ahmadu Bello University, Zaria, Nigeria in 1990; a master's degree in Arabic from the Khartoum International Institute for Arabic Language, Sudan in 1995; and a PhD in Arabic from the Ahmadu Bello University, Zaria, in 2004.

== Professional life and contributions ==
Ndagi was the National President of the Academic Society for Arabic Language and Literature in Nigeria (ASALLIN) for two terms of two years each (2013–2017). He is an academic, a poet, and a writer who writes in Arabic and English languages. He has published five single-author books including a collection of poems titled Musings in the dark (2005); and The Phonetics of Nupe Language and its Transcription with Arabic Symbols (2000). He has 30 papers so far published in peer-reviewed local and international journals. They include "A Thematic Exposition of the Nupe Ajami Manuscript Heritage of Northern Nigeria" published in 2011 in Islamic Africa: A Publication of Northwestern University, Evanston, USA; "Muslims of Niger State: A Survey" published in 2012 by the Oxford Department of International Development, Queen Elizabeth House, United Kingdom; "الـمجاز بين العربية ونـوﭙﯽ: دراسة لغوية تقابلية" published in 2015 in ALIMI: Journal of the Arabic Department, University of Ilorin, Ilorin, Nigeria. Ndagi's research interests include stylistics and contrastive linguistic analysis between Arabic and Nupe languages with specific reference to the phonetics, rhetoric and morphology of the two. He serves as a member of the Nupe Language Committee set up in 2013 by His Royal Highness, the Etsu Nupe Alhaji Yahaya Abubakar CFR. The Committee is commissioned to, among other assignments; develop a standardized orthography and rudimentary literature for Nupe language.

He co-authored Spectrum Arabic for Primary Schools; Books 1-6 published in 2017 by Spectrum Books Limited, Ibadan, Nigeria. He also co-authored Islamic Religious Studies for Primary Schools; Books 1-6 published in 2015 by the West African Book Publishers Limited, Lagos, Nigeria. He is the Lead Author of the Book "A History of Agaie: 1820-2020" published in 2021. He has, so far, attended over 40 conferences and workshops within and outside Nigeria including the 2nd International Conference on Arabic Language held in May 2013 in Dubai, the United Arab Emirates; and the International Symposium on Arabic Learning Programs and Output Assessment organized in October 2013 by the National Center for Assessment in Higher Education, Riyadh, Saudi Arabia. Ndagi was a researcher on the Islam Research Programme, IRP-Abuja Project, funded by the Dutch Foreign Ministry. The research, which lasted for two years (2010-2012), focused on Inter-faith Relations in Northern Nigeria.

His contributions to Arabic studies at the secondary level of Nigeria's educational system include heading the Arabic team that reviewed the 9-year Basic Education Curriculum (BEC) in September 2024 under the auspices of the Nigerian Educational Research and Development Council (NERDC). As a follow up to this review, he was invited in April 2025 to participate in the concept planning and writing workshops that developed the Teachers' Guide for the implementation of the revised 9-year BEC for Arabic. In 2012, Ndagi was also part of the exercise organised by the NERDC to review the country's BEC. He was also the Chief Examiner for Arabic Paper 1B at the National Examinations Council (NECO), Minna, Niger State, Nigeria (2000–2004); Item Writer for Arabic Paper I and II for the Senior School Certificate Examination (SSCE) conducted by the National Examinations Council, Minna, Niger State, Nigeria (2000–2004); and Chief Team Leader/Examiner for the Junior School Certificate Examination (JSCE) conducted by the erstwhile National Board for Educational Measurement (NBEM), Minna, Niger State, Nigeria (1996–1999).

Professor Ndagi's membership of professional bodies includes being the Chairman of the Federal Capital Territory FCT branch of the Nigeria Association of Teachers of Arabic and Islamic Studies (NATAIS) 2001–2009. He is also a member of the Association of Nigerian Authors (ANA) as well as full member of the Nigerian Institute of Management (MNIM).

In March 2023, Prof. Ndagi was a participant at the seminar on "Arabic Language outside of Saudi Arabia" held at the King Salman Global Academy for Arabic Language, Riyadh, Saudi Arabia. In May 2017, Ndagi represented Nigeria at a regional workshop on text development for teaching Arabic to non-speakers in West and Central Africa, which was organized by the Islamic Educational Scientific and Cultural Organization (ISESCO) in Ndjamena, Republic of Chad. In May 2013, Ndagi was a participant at a Symposium on International Teaching Programme and result evaluation" held at the National Center for Assessment in Higher Education, Riyadh, Saudi Arabic.

== Work experience ==
Muhammad Umaru Ndagi taught for three years as a Grade II teacher at the Waziri Primary School, Agaie, Niger State (1979–1982). He was employed by the Federal Ministry of Education in 1985 and was posted to teach Arabic at Federal Government College, Kwali, Abuja, Nigeria where he spent 20 years (1985–2005) as a classroom teacher. In 2005, Ndagi joined the services of the University of Abuja, Abuja, Nigeria where he still lectures in the Department of Linguistics and African Languages.

Between 2014 and 2016, Ndagi served as the Deputy Dean of the Faculty of Arts, University of Abuja, Abuja. Within the same period, he served on various university committees including the University Staff Development Committee and the University Examinations Monitoring Committee. He also served on the University Students Disciplinary Committee 2005–2009. He was at the Nigerian Educational Research and Development Council (NERDC), Abuja, Nigeria for a 12 months sabbatical leave; from May 2016 to April 2017. In 2018, he was appointed Deputy Dean, School of Postgraduate Studies, University of Abuja, Abuja, Nigeria. He served as the Dean, Faculty of Arts, University of Abuja, Abuja, Nigeria from 2020 to 2023.

Prof Ndagi was appointed in February 2024 by President Bola Ahmed Tinubu to serve for a 4-year tenure as a part-time Board Member and Zonal Commissioner representing North-Central geo-political Zone at the National Hajj Commission of Nigeria (NAHCON).

== Community service ==
He was at different times a member of some committees set up by the Niger State Government including the Niger State Committee for the Integration of Qur'anic Schools with Western Education (2008–2009) and the Niger State Committee on Peace Building for Sustainable Democratic Culture (2012–2015). As a public speaker, he has presented about 30 public lectures and speeches. As a columnist who writes Philosofaith for Daily Trust on Saturday, one of the leading and widely-read newspapers in Nigeria; Ndagi has contributed over 700 newspaper articles. From 2005 to date, he has been on the Editorial Board of the Daily Trust newspaper. Ndagi is the secretary to the Board of Trustees for the Babba Center for Historical Documentation and Research (BACHIDAR) located in Agaie, Niger State, Nigeria. This Heritage Center was established to encourage scientific researches into the history of Agaie and its people. The Center exists to collect, analyze and catalogue literary treasures of the foremost scholars of Agaie; using modern technology to digitize, preserve and popularize the intellectual and socio-cultural heritage of Agaie people.

== Academic prizes and awards ==
Ndagi earned the Islamic Publications Bureau Award for the Best Graduating Student in B. Ed Islamic Studies from the Ahmadu Bello University, Zaria, Nigeria, in 1990. While graduating in 1985 with the Nigerian Certificate in Education (NCE) from the Niger State College of Education, Minna, Niger State, he also earned the prize for the Best Graduating Student in Arabic Language. He received the General Mamman Vatsa Literary Award in 2011 from Nupe Foundation (Ninibo Nupe) at the 3rd Nupe Festival in Bida, Niger State, Nigeria. Ndagi was presented with a Meritorious Service Award in 2013 by the Abuja branch of the Nigeria Association of Teachers of Arabic and Islamic Studies (NATAIS). He also received a Merit Award in 2004 for the Longest Serving Academic Staff at the 20th Anniversary of Federal Government College, Kwali, Abuja. He was honoured by the Nigerian Students Union in Sudan with a Merit award in 1995. Ndagi is married with children.

In recognition of his contributions to knowledge, Professor Ndagi received a fellowship award, "Fellow of Arabic Studies in Nigeria (FASIN)" in February 2025 from the Academic Society for Arabic Language and Literature in Nigeria (ASALLIN).
