= Gender roles and fluidity in indigenous Nigerian cultures =

The colonization of the West African region that lies across the Niger River took place between the mid 19th century and 1960 when Nigeria became recognized as an independent nation. This systemic invasion introduced new social, economic, and political structures that significantly altered Indigenous notions of gender fluidity and gender roles. The imposition of Western ideologies in some way or the other may have influenced African socio-cultural practices invariably leading to a shift in power relations, societal expectations, gender-roles expressions or even identities. European colonial powers introduced legal frameworks that often reinforced patriarchal structures and diminished the recognition of Indigenous practices that embraced gender diversity. The imposition of Western systems had lasting consequences, influencing inheritance laws, property rights, and marital practices. This not only marginalized women within the legal framework but also eroded the traditional roles of certain societies where women held significant economic and political power. The juxtaposition of colonial legal norms with Indigenous customs created tension and reshaped the social fabric, contributing to the evolving landscape of gender roles and fluidity in Nigerian cultures. This impact of colonial legal systems and educational structures interacted with the diverse cultural landscapes of Nigeria, affecting communities in distinct ways. The consequences of colonial impositions on legal frameworks and educational curricula were filtered through the lenses of diverse cultural contexts, shaping unique challenges and opportunities for different ethnic groups.

== Gender roles and non-conformity in pre-colonial Igbo society ==
The Igbo society consists of Abia, Anambra, Ebonyi, Enugu, and Imo States with a distinctive Indigenous central language that is spoken across the five states that make up the Igbo society. This language extends to Anioma region of Delta State and some regions of Rivers State In Southern Nigeria.

=== Igbo pronouns and naming systems ===
In Igbo, the pronoun 'ọ' indicates both male and female. Some Igbo names are gender-neutral, though traditional names may denote gender. Furthermore, some nouns and pronouns denote gender, including "nwoke" (man) and "nwanyi" (woman).

=== Male daughters and female husbands ===
Following the Igbo culture of male dominance, a female daughter cannot inherit landed properties; a man who does not have male offspring will confer on his first daughter the role of a male child through a cultural rite and covenant referred to as "Igba Ndu". The female daughter, now considered a male daughter, assumes the role of a male in the family. Upon this conferment, the male daughter is not allowed to marry to prevent her from leaving the family compound.

Female husbands on the other hand, were women who assumed roles typically associated with men, including the responsibilities of a husband within a marriage. This practice was often linked to issues of infertility, as a woman might take on the role of a husband to ensure the continuity of her family line. In such cases, a female husband could marry other women and engage in socially sanctioned reproductive practices, such as bearing children through a female wife on behalf of her infertile spouse. This practice, known as Nwanyi Bu showcased the pragmatic adaptation of gender roles to address specific societal needs.

In both instances, these gender categories challenged Western preconceptions and demonstrated the flexibility of gender roles in Igbo society. The recognition of male daughters and the acceptance of female husbands reflected the nuanced understanding of gender and identity within the cultural and spiritual context of pre-colonial Igbo communities. It's important to note that these practices were deeply embedded in the Igbo worldview and were not merely acts of defiance against established gender norms but rather culturally grounded expressions of identity and societal functionality.

Ada mmuonwu (‘daughter’, or ‘maiden spirit of the dead’; also called as ‘Agboho Mmanwu’ or ‘Adamma’ in some parts of Igbo society) is a female spirit that possesses a man during funeral ceremonies; upon possession, this masked male mortal spiritually acquires femininity, becoming fluid in expression until when the dead is laid down and the ceremony ends.

== Sexuality, gender roles, and fluidity in pre-colonial Yoruba ==
The Yoruba culture is the embodiment of the cultural practices and identity of the Yoruba people, an ethnic group predominantly found in Nigeria and other West African regions. Known for its richness and diversity, Yoruba culture encompasses various facets such as language, religion, art, music, dance, and social customs.

Before the arrival of Europeans in the seventeenth century, the Yorùbá society held unique perspectives on gender definitions and relations. Unlike the Western binary construct of male/men and female/women, such distinctions did not exist in Yorùbá societies. Oyèrónkẹ́ Oyěwùmí, in "The Invention of Women: Making African Sense of Western Gender Discourse," delves into pre-colonial Yorùbá practices and explores the erasure's modern implications.

In Yorùbá culture, differences between males and females were rooted in social practices rather than biological facts, as emphasized by Oyèrónkẹ́ Oyěwùmí. The prefixes "obìn" and "okùn" were used to specify anatomical varieties, yet the Yorùbá lacked a term for gender or any related concept prior to colonial influence. This absence of linguistic references may reflect that the concept of gender as a fundamental social category was introduced to Yorùbá society from the West.

One important cultural inclination that became silent as a result of colonial invasion is the practice of homosexuality among the Yoruba people. This practice is addressed with a euphemistic word: "adodi/adofuro" which is used to refer to people who engage in anal penetration.

== Roles, identity, and sexualities in pre-colonial Hausa Fulani ==
Occupying the Northern region of present day Nigeria, the Hausa Kingdoms consisted of seven Hausa states, each with distinctive cultural inclinations on gender roles and fluidity prior to the Jihadist establishment of the Sokoto Caliphate which brought about the final Islamization of the major Hausa states between the 18th and 19th centuries. The predominant religious practices of the Hausa-Fulani people prior to this invasion was Maguzawa, a religious system integral to the practice of Animism, consisting of spirit possession and exorcism that was done by both male and female believers. Unlike the Islamic religion, women were allowed to make certain decisions that were contrary to those of their male counterparts, unlike what one finds in present day Islamic practices. For instance, within the Bori sub-ethnic group in Kano, women could divorce their husbands without any religious impediments. These women, often referred to with the derogatory Hausa slur Karuwanci, therefore chose to live in an area of their towns named gidan mata under the leadership of the magajiya. They were known for their peculiar livelihood made from dance and prostitution. Within gidan mata - women quarters - there were some organized systemic governing structures that guided the conduct of the women and protected them against potential abuses by their male patrons. Women's roles and their interactions with the society began to take a certain form following the Islamization; this movement which introduced the Yan Taru system has perhaps transformed the roles and societal interactions of many Hausa women today.

Another dynamic cultural inclination which may have been silenced by colonialist ideologies is on gender identities and sexualities, which is today being alleged by some to have been non-existent in pre-colonial Nigerian societies. However, a close examination of certain cultural beliefs and practices within the pre-colonial Hausa-Fulani society provides factual evidence of long existing fluidity and same gender practices. One of such cases is the existence of yan daudu within the Hausa Fulani sub-ethnic society.
