= Loofball =

Team ball sport

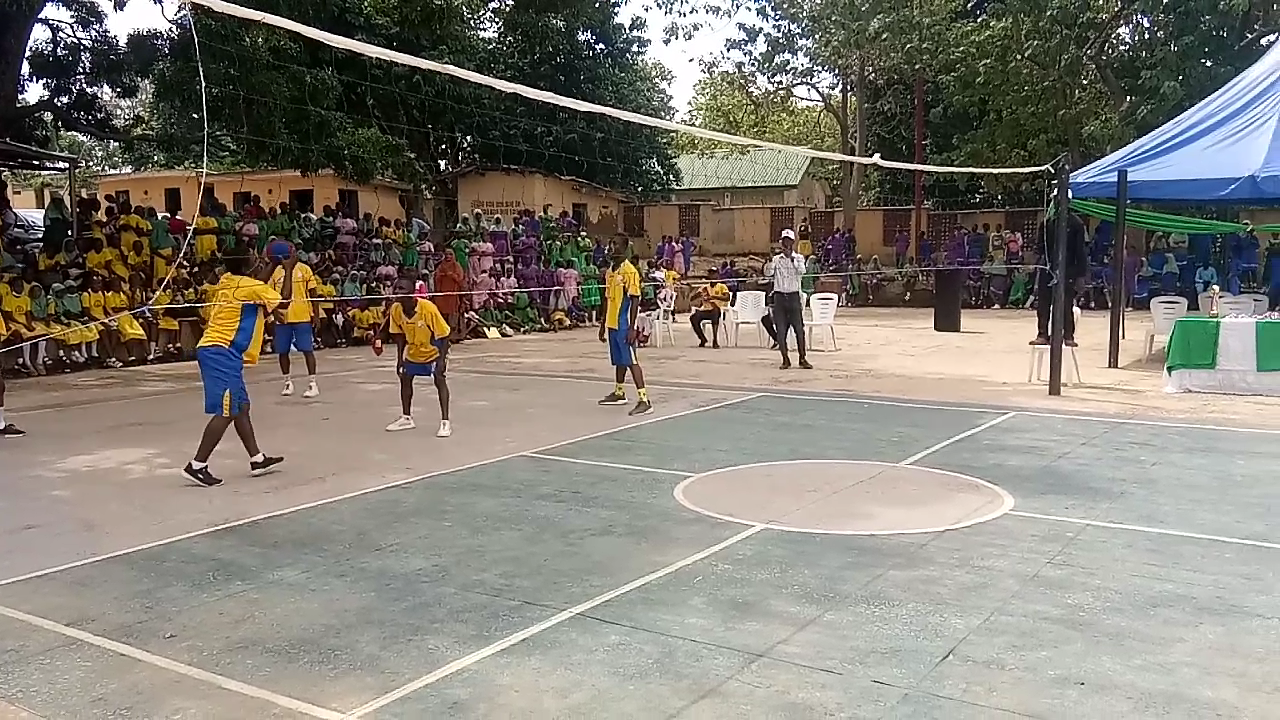
- A loofball game in Abuja, Nigeria
- First played: 2017; 9 years ago

Characteristics
- Contact: Non-contact
- Team members: 5
- Type: Team sport, ball sport
- Equipment: Loofball, net
- Venue: Loofball court

Presence
- Country or region: Most prominent in Nigeria

Loofball is a team sport played by two teams of five players on a unique rectangular court separated by a net. A furry ball is thrown over the net with the intent to ground it on the opponents' court, subject to rules of the game. Loofball combines some features of handball and volleyball. and is playable by contestants in all age-groups. The sport is particularly popular in Nigerian schools and communities. It is controlled and administered by the Loofball Sport Development Initiative (LSDI).

== History ==
Loofball began in Nigeria in 2017. It was created in response to the growing societal ills and violence in the 21st century to engage youth in sport and sports development, thereby promoting peace and reducing crime. Initially, the sport was played between two and four players by throwing of a size 1 handball over a rope. However, the sport saw remarkable changes based on research and experiments in early 2018. A furry round ball replaced the size 1 handball while number of players per team increased to five and net replaced rope. Later that year, the first rules of the game were prepared and compiled by Winner V. Matahula. As a result of these improvements, the sport evolved rapidly and became popular in some northern parts of the country, including the Federal Capital Territory. This led the promoters of the sport to incorporate as a non-profit organization with the objective to develop and administer the sport officially, which further increased the sport's acceptability. Registered as Loofball Sport Development Initiative, the organization has since been partnering with government agencies, private and other non-profit organizations to run school and non-school programs and events. In 2020, the organization received the African Excellence Award by MEA Markets, a UK-based business magazine, in recognition of her role in contributing to youth development in Nigeria.

== Rules and gameplay ==
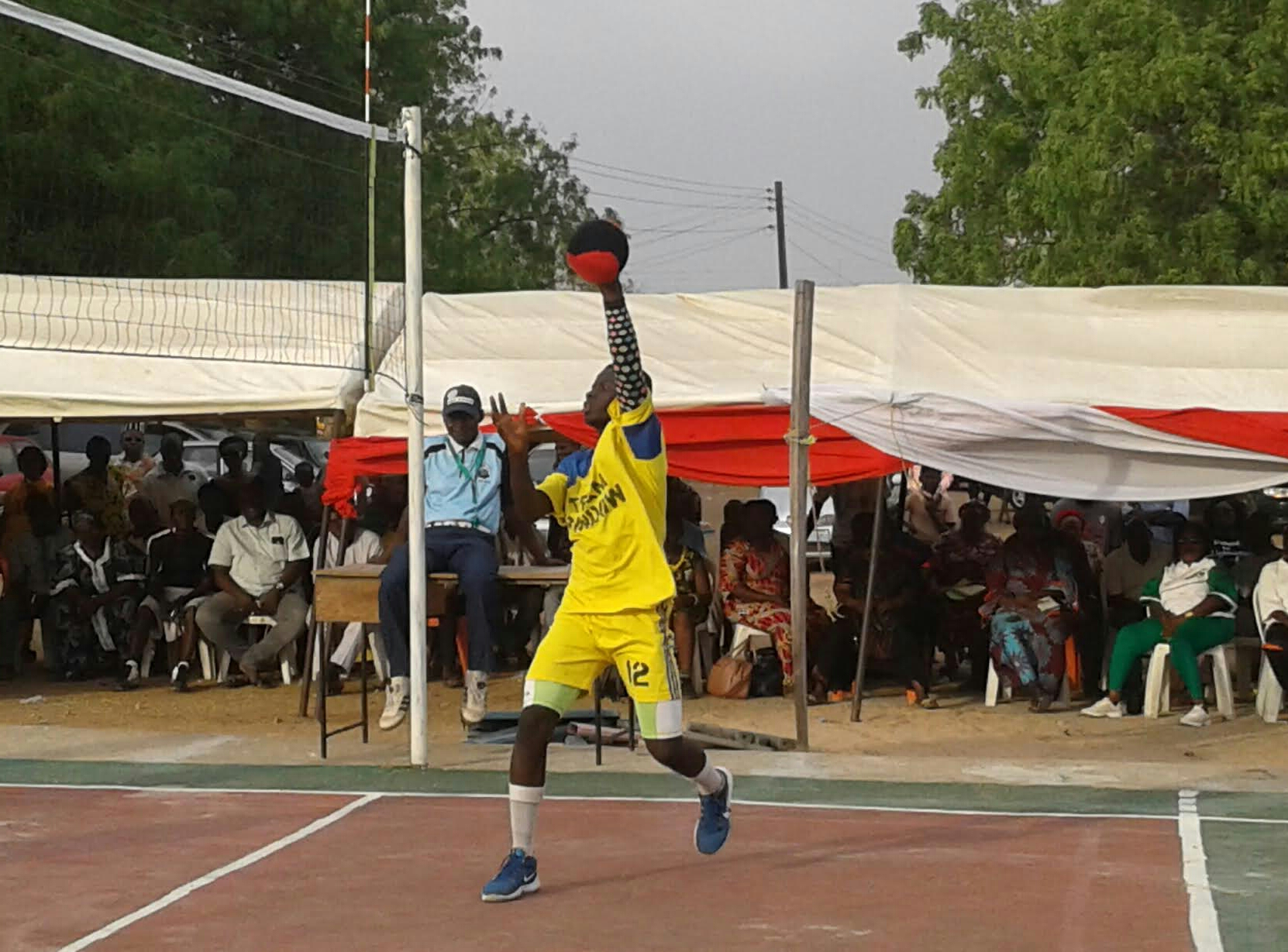
Loofball player in action during a unity tournament in Adamawa State, northern Nigeria

Loofball is played on a court measuring 17 m by 8 m with a circular region of 2 m diameter, called "olive", at its center. The olive is also centered in the "fore zone", a 5.2 m by 8 m quadripartite region, which borders the "home zone" on either side. The home zone measures 5.9 m by 8 m.

A player holds the ball for no more than 3 seconds, makes no more than two steps with the ball and can hold the ball only once in a turn. Ball contact is made only by hand and forearm, and only one player can hold the ball at a time. No more than two passes are also allowed in a turn.

Before a play begins, teams arrange themselves in two rows within the home zone, with three players in the front row and two in the back row. The left player in the back row serves from the serving area by jump-shooting (throwing the ball with speed by jumping) to the opponents’ home zone. A player in the home zone attacks by jump-shooting to the opponents’ home zone whereas a player in the fore zone lobs (throwing the ball gently without jumping) either diagonally to the opponents’ portion of the fore zone or to the opponents’ home zone.

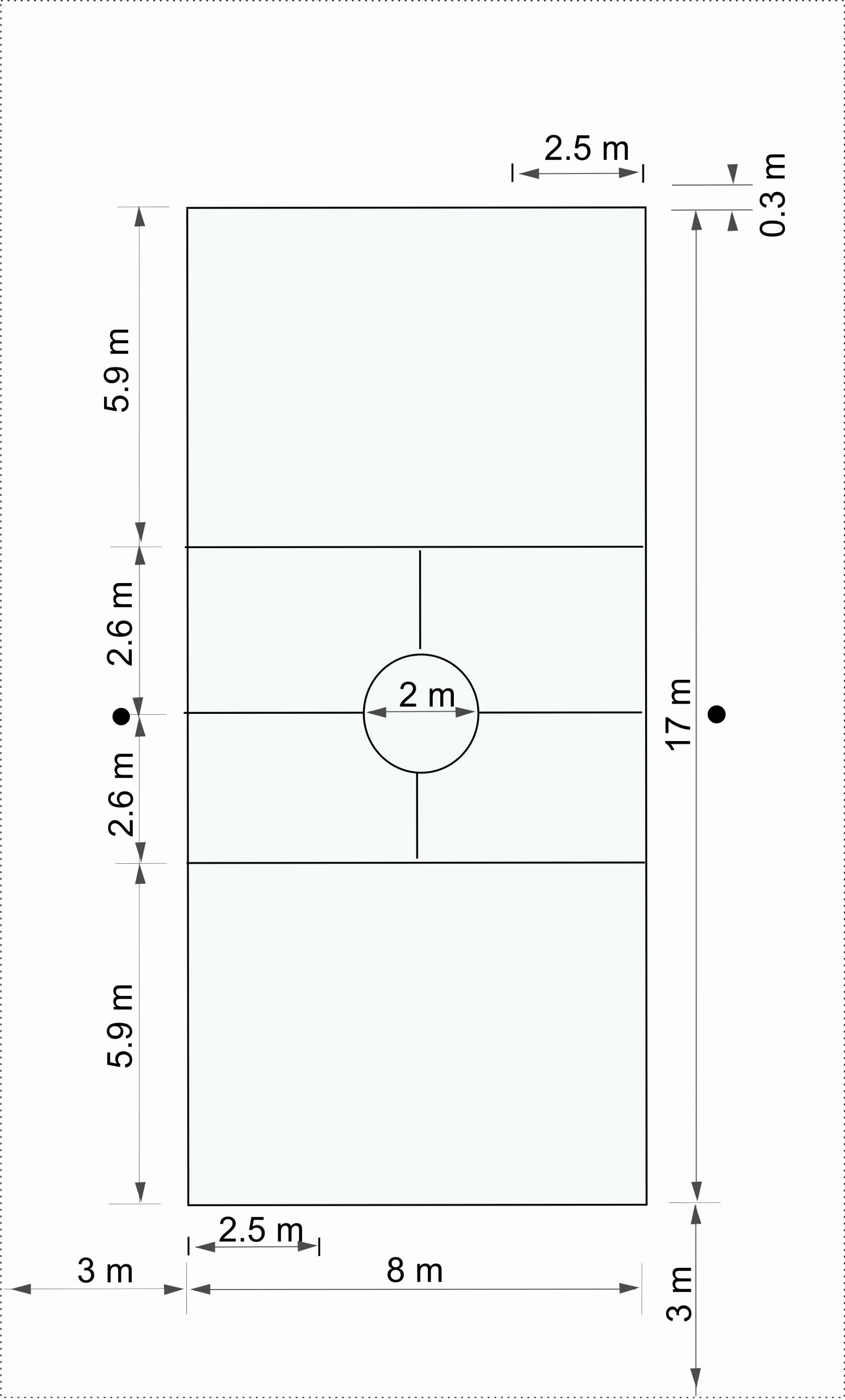
Dimensions of a loofball court

A team scores a point when the opponents fail to return the ball or commit a fault. A match consists of two or three sets i.e. winning two sets wins the match. The first and second sets are won by scoring 25 points while 20 points must be scored to win the third set. A two-point lead is required to win a set. Scoring a point gives a team the right to serve.

A match starts with a coin toss between captains of both teams to determine sides and the team to make the first serve. Teams are required to change sides after the first set, with the first service obligation going the other way. The referee is also required to conduct another coin toss when the match reaches the third set.

A team can request a 30 seconds timeout only once in a set and is permitted to make up to four substitutions in a match. A starter who is substituted can be reused as a sub once in a match; a player not in the starting lineup can enter the court once in a match. An interval or break of up to 2 minutes can also be allowed between sets.

=== Ball ===
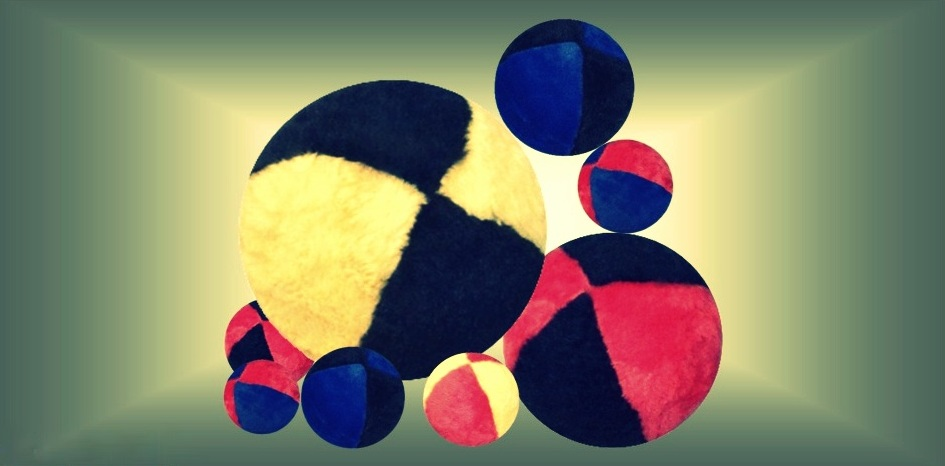
Typical 4-panel loofballs

An inflatable furry ball, referred to as a loofball, is used in the sport. The ball's outer surface is made of furry fabric or animal fur. A size 2 loofball has a diameter of 19 – 20 cm and weighs 190 – 240 g when inflated. Similarly, a size 1 loofball when inflated has a diameter of 16 –17 cm and weighs 150 – 190 g. A loofball surface fur has a pile length of no more than 2.5 cm.

=== Net ===
The net used is similar to that of volleyball, with the length being the only difference. The net, which measures 8.5 m in length and 1 m in width, is fixed above the center line of the court at the height of 2.3 m (men) or 2.28 m (women and U20).

=== Match officials ===
Officials may include a referee, two or four line judges, a scorer and an assistant scorer. The line judges assist the referee in making calls mostly regarding boundary lines. Alongside enforcing the rules of the game, the referee ensures that discipline is maintained throughout the match. The scorer and assistant scorer also help in officiating by keeping record of the match score.

=== Misconduct and sanctions ===
Depending on the degree and order of offense, misconduct in loofball attracts either a verbal warning, a yellow or red card. A verbal warning carries no penalty. A yellow card carries a point penalty while a red card carries both a point penalty and disqualification. A player usually gets sanctioned in the following order: first misconduct = verbal warning, second misconduct = yellow card + point to the opposition, third misconduct = red card + point to the opposition + disqualification.

== Intellectual property ==
Loofball is a registered trademark and a patented design. The IP rights associated with the sport are there to legally preserve the name "loofball" and restrict unauthorized commercial production of its equipment. The IP rights holders deem these restrictions vital to the advancement of the sport.
