= Matthew Opaluwa =

Àtá of Igala

Àtá Matthew Opaluwa
- His Royal Majesty

King of Igala Kingdom
- In office: 18 October 2021 – present
- Coronation: 4 March 2022
- Predecessor: Attah Michael Ameh Oboni II
- Born: Idah, Northern Region, British Nigeria (now Idah, Kogi State, Nigeria)
Names
- Ọ̀pàlúwa Alaji Ọm Ọ̀pàlúwa Ògwùchẹ́ Akpá
- House: Aju Àáméè Acho
- Father: Ọ̀pàlúwa Ògwúché Akpá
- Mother: Eke Ọ̀pàlúwa Edicha
- Religion: Christianity

Matthew Alaji Opaluwa Oguche Akpa II is the 28th Àtá Ígálá (paramount ruler) of the Igala Kingdom in the Middle Belt of Nigeria.

== Life and education ==
Opaluwa was born into the Opaluwa Oguche Akpa royal family of the Aju Ameacho ruling house of Igala Kingdom. He is the ninth child of 16 surviving children and forth of the six male children of Chief Opaluwa Oguche. His mother was Mama Eke Opaluwa (née Edicha).

Young Opaluwa's educational journey began in 1975 at St. Boniface Primary School, Idah, West Central State, obtaining a first school leaving certificate at completion, thereafter proceeding to St.Peter's College Idah, where he enrolled for and passed the West African Schools Certificate (WASC) examination in 1980. In 1981, following his father's advise, he sought for and got admitted into the School of Basic Studies, Ugbokolo, Benue State, obtaining an A-level certificate in 1983. He proceeded to Ahmadu Bello University, Zaria, in the same year, graduating in 1986 with a Bachelor of Science degree (B.Sc.) in Business Administration. He thereafter served in the one-year compulsory National Youths Service Corps (NYSC) scheme in Niger State in 1987. He would later, in 1997, return to Ahmadu Bello University, Zaria, to obtain a master's degree (MBA) in Business Administration.

== Working career ==
Opaluwa's working career began in 1988, with the Independent National Electoral Commission (INEC), as an Administrative Officer. He then rose to the rank of deputy director, serving in many Local Government Areas of Kogi State, Nigeria, like Idah, Ofu, Ankpa, Bassa, Ibaji, Mopa/Amuro and Okene, as electoral officers. He later got transferred to the Kaduna State INEC Headquarters and made to take charge of the Transportation unit. While there, he also served as Electoral officer (E.O.) in Sabon Gari, Kajuru, Kaduna South, Kauru, and Kaduna North Local Government Areas, respectively. In July 2009, he again got transferred to the Katsina State INEC Headquarters where he was in-charge of the Research and Documentations unit and also served as the electoral officer, first at Dandume LGA, then transferred to Gwagwalada LGA, in the Federal Capital Territory during the 2011 general elections, after which he returned to Katsina State and served in Danja and Dutsinma Local Government Areas of the state up till the time of the 2015 Nigerian general elections.

== Enthronement ==
The journey of Opaluwa's reign as the 28th Àtá Ígáláà began with his selection by the Ígáláà Traditional Council on 28 April 2021, as Attah-designate, and confirmed on 18 October 2021, following an official approval by the Kogi State Executive Council in Lokoja, the state capital, about a year after the demise of his predecessor, Attah Idakwo Ameh Oboni II in August 2020. He was, however, officially installed and presented the Staff of Office in a coronation ceremony held on Friday, 4 March 2022, at the Civic Center, Idah, Kogi State. The event was attended by royal dignitaries amongst which was the Olu of Warri, Ogiame Atuwatse III.
