= Unuedegor =

Village in Edo State

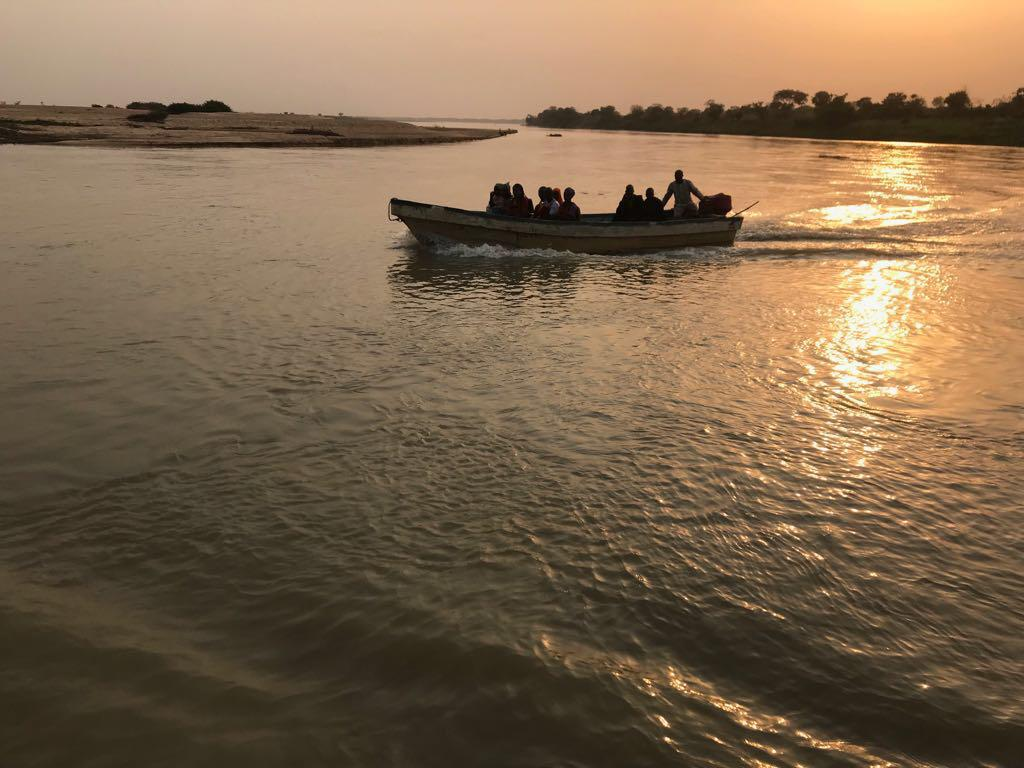
Sunset in Unuedegor

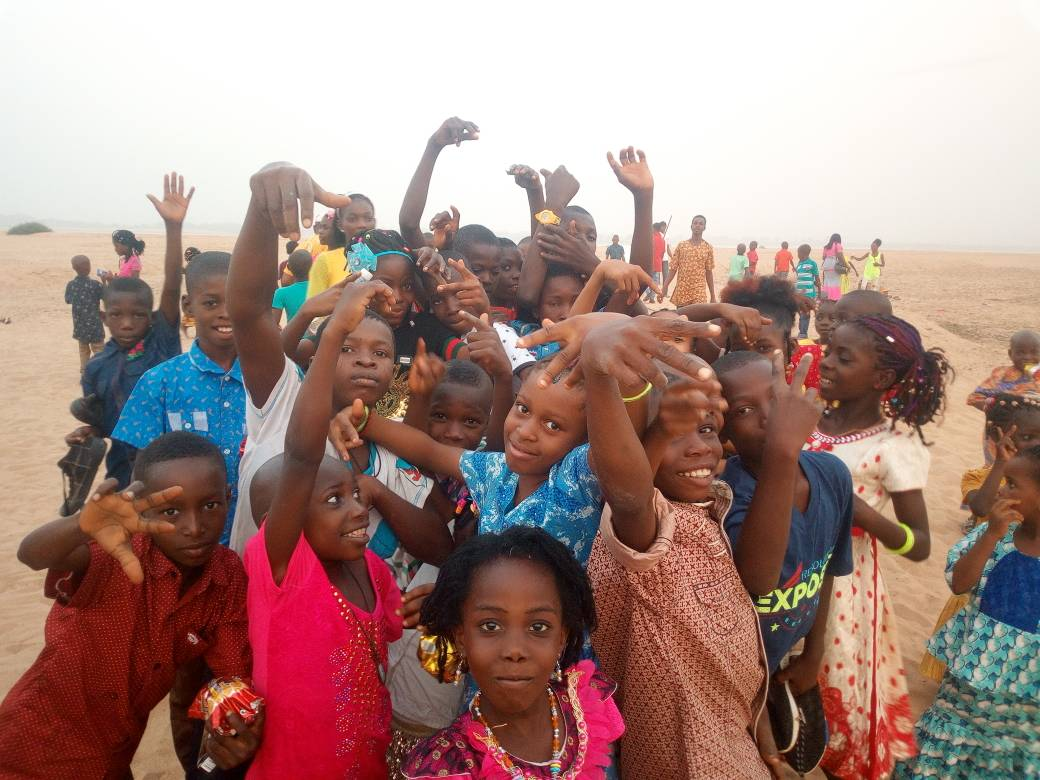
Kids at Christmas party

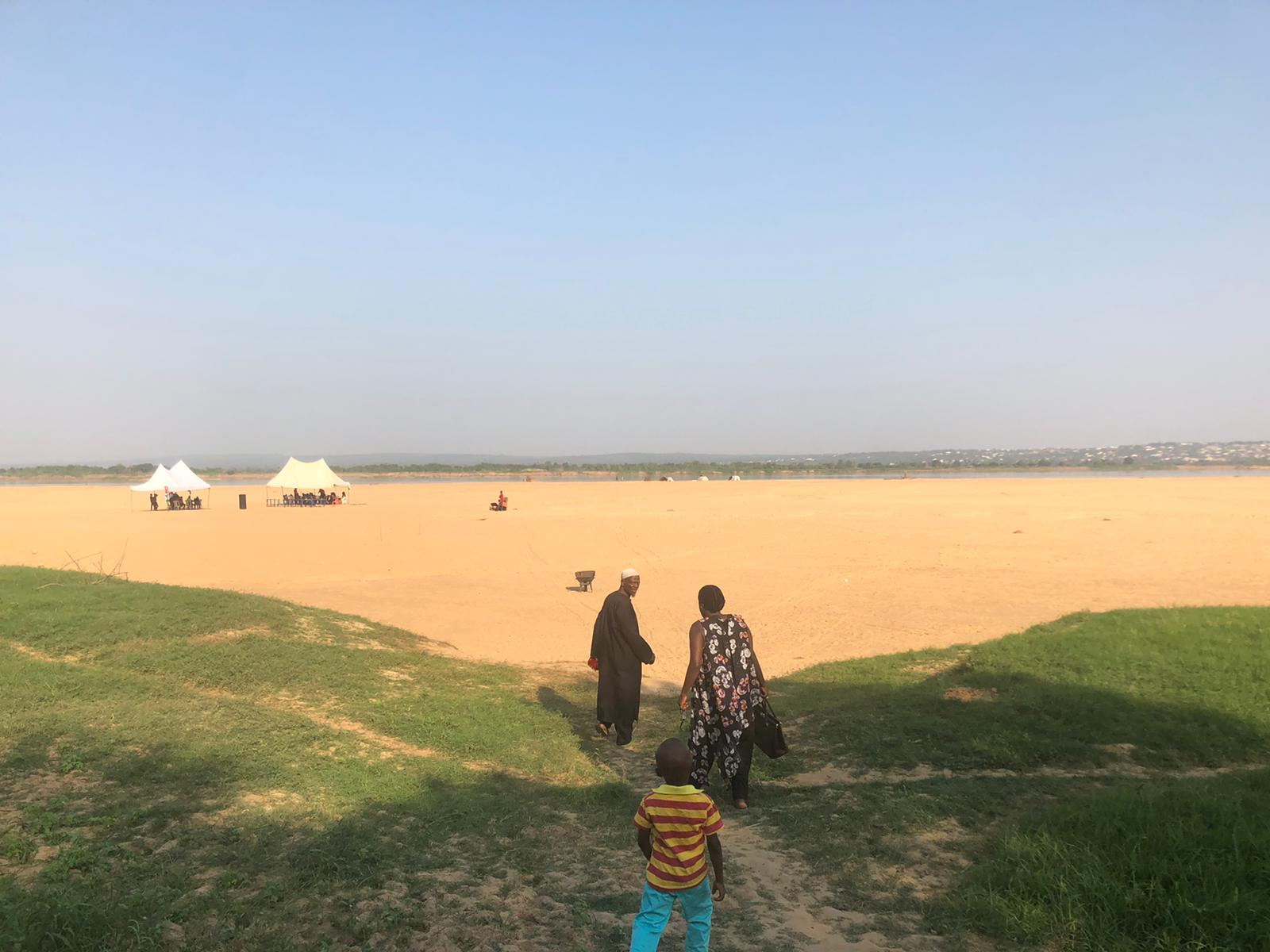
Beach at Unuedegor

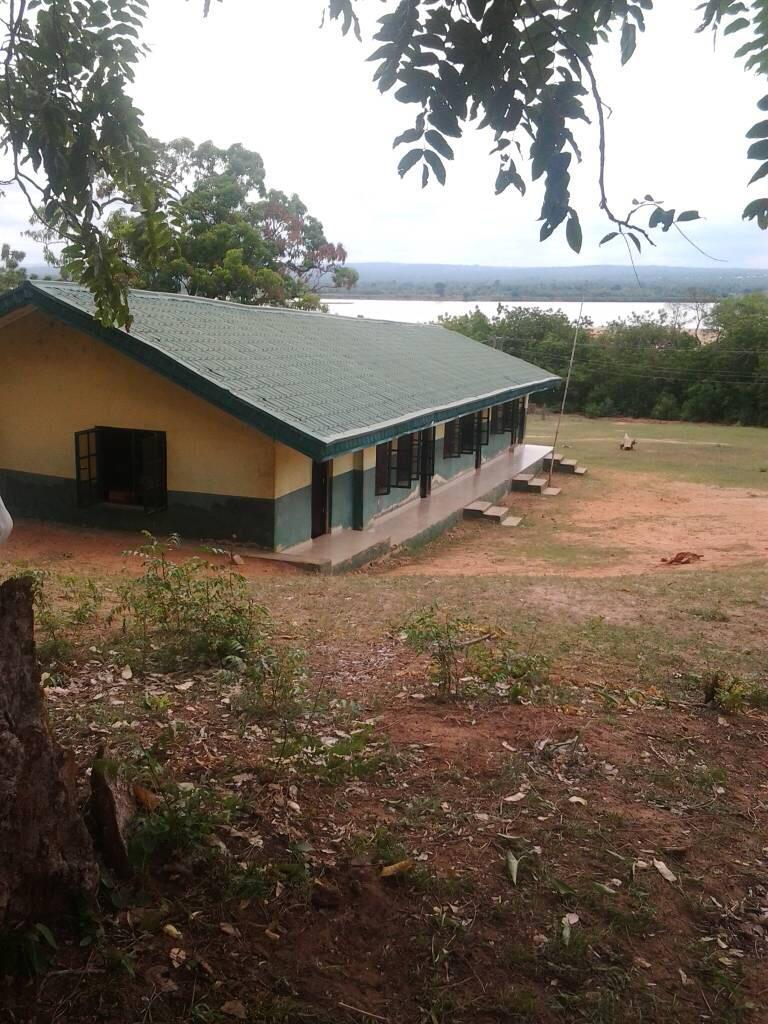
Otse Primary School Unuedegor

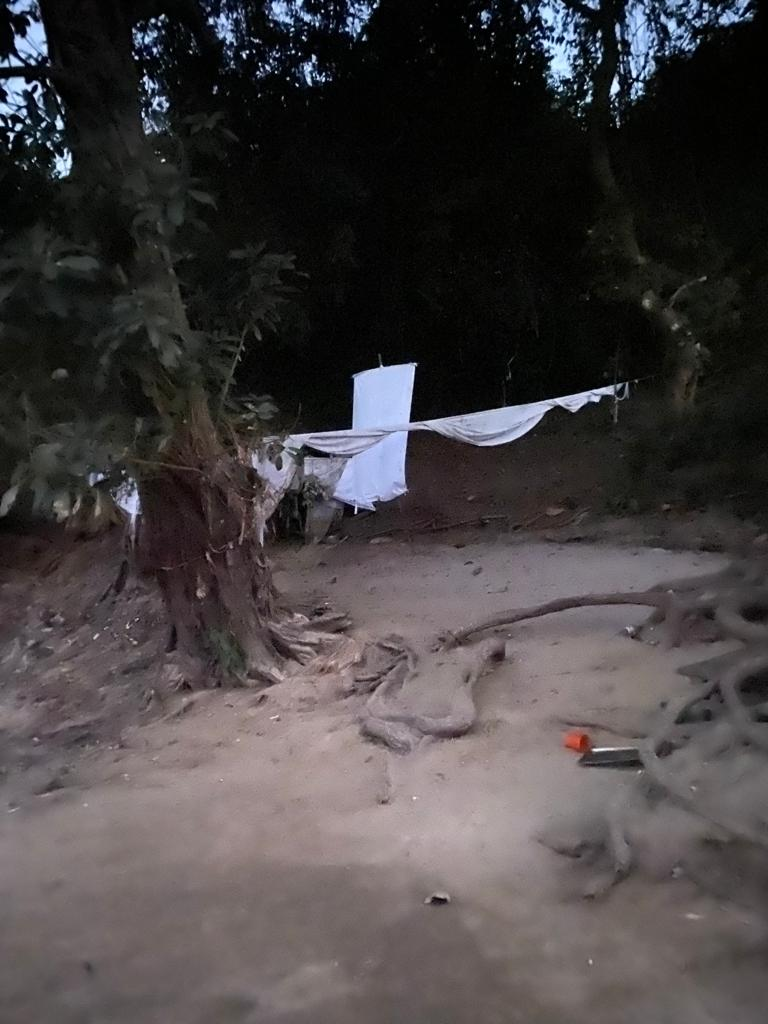
Olifa Shrine

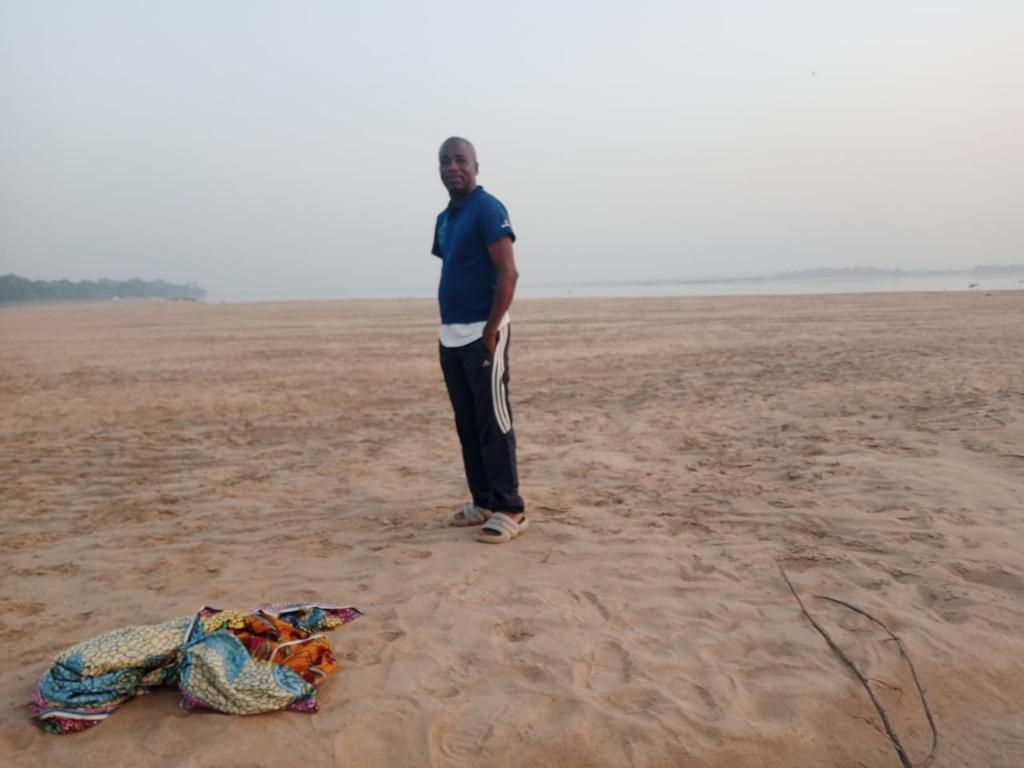

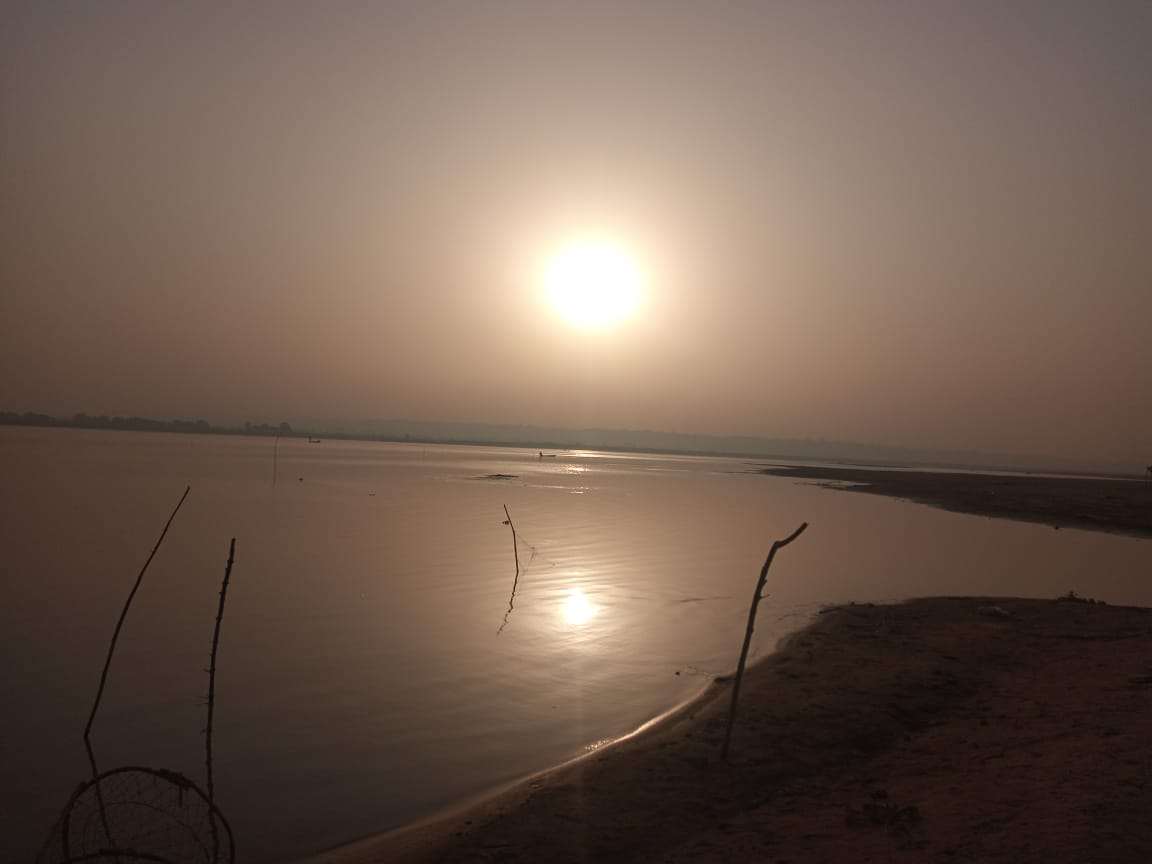

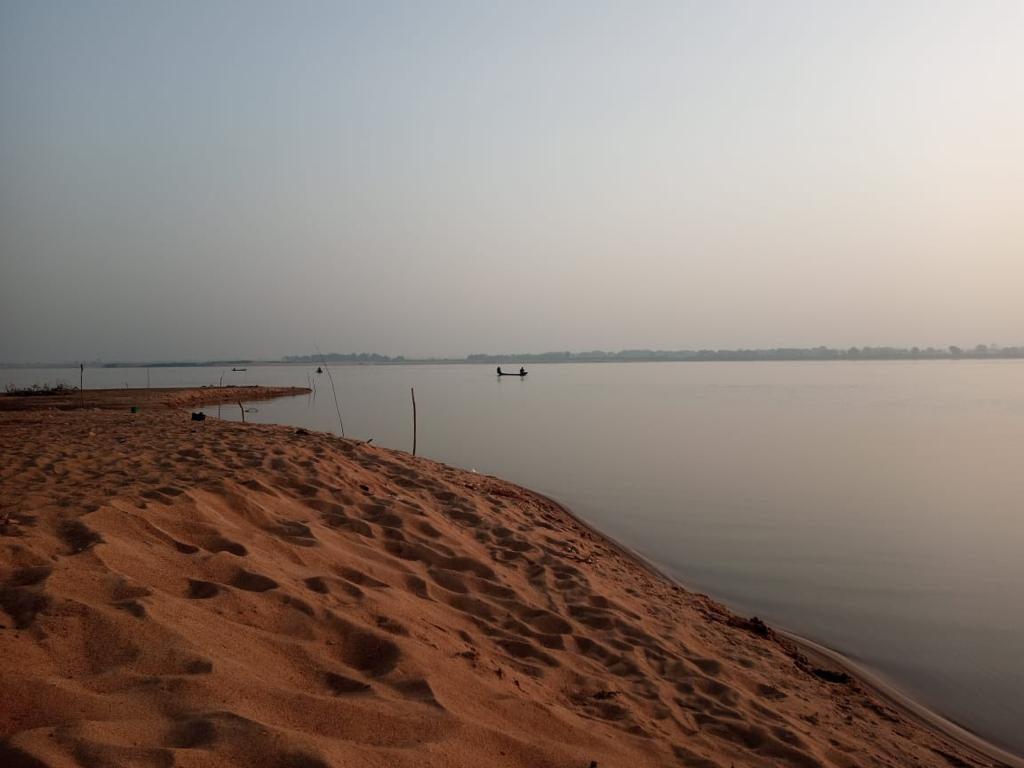

Unuedegor is a community located along the banks of the Niger River in Etsako East local government area of Edo State in Nigeria. It is about eight kilometers north of Agenebode, where the Etsako East local government headquarters are located. Bordered on the east by Idah in Kogi State, with the River Niger in the middle of both communities, it is bordered on the west by Egor-Na-Ugeh along the Nigerian Railways tracks that run from Ajaokuta to Warri in Delta State, and in the north by Uzanu Community of the Uneme Kingdom.

Unuedegor comprises four sections, namely:

- Ukpekoi General (Southern part bordering Agenebode).
- Unueda – (Waterfront, main village).
- Unueda – Olifa (Where two deities namely Olifa the female and Achadu the male are located).
- Ojuwo (Hilly uninhabited part of town where people farm and fish)

== People ==
Unuedegor was first settled in the early 16th century by a team of brothers who migrated from the Egor community in the uplands also called Egor-na-Ikho, the brothers were later joined by migrants from communities mainly of Egori extraction, namely:

- Ivianokpodi
- Iviukhua
- Iviebua
- Egor-na-Uger
- Iviegbepui
- Unueda-Egor (Unuedegor)

The first five villages are where the bulk of the descendants of today's indigenes migrated from. Put together the six villages make up the Egori community as it is known today, while the first five are the Egor-na-Ikho.

The first non-Egor people to migrate to Unuedegor are the Igala people, from Idah in Kogi State who came across the River Niger and settled in Unuedegor at a section they later named Ojuwo. Over the years, people who come from different backgrounds in Unuedegor today have intermarried and lived as one big family, mostly descendant of the early settlers.

A few other non-Egor people have come, stayed, and gone back to their respective villages in the past 30 years plus. Unuedegor people are primarily fishermen and farmers by profession.

== Places of interest ==
Unuedegor is blessed with the River Niger which allows for swimming, very white sands for beach parties and other events in the dry seasons, lots of open spaces on the sands for camping and fishing, birds and nature watching, hiking, and numerous water sports.

Unuedegor is the first place where Royal Niger Company established its base operations in the western region of Nigeria. The relics they left behind, still exist for example their old warehouses, one of which is now converted into a village church, the docking area in Ojuwo where the ships arriving with cargos from Great Britain discharged their cargos for onwards distribution.
