= Ameh (Nigerian name) =

Nigerian given name

- Gender: Male
- Language: Igala

Origin
- Origin: Igala & Idoma
- Meaning: "Powerful man who can defeat anyone"
- Region of origin: Middle belt, Nigeria

Ameh audio is a masculine Nigerian given name and surname of Igala origin, and it means "Powerful man, one who can defeat anyone" The name is commonly found among the Ígálá and Idoma people in the Middle Belt region of Nigeria, and it is morphologically spelt "Amueh".

== Notable people with the name & surname ==
- Ada Ameh ( 1974 -2022) Nigerian actress
- Ameh Ebute (born 1946) Nigerian politician and lawyer
- Aruwa Ameh (1990- 2011) Nigerian footballer
- Idakwo Ameh Oboni II (1948 -2020) 27th Àtá Ígálá
