= Onoja =

- Gender: Male
- Language(s): Igala

Origin
- Word/name: Nigeria
- Meaning: leader or head of the people

Onoja is a Nigerian surname. Notable people with the surname include:

- Edward Onoja (born 1974), deputy governor of Kogi State (2019–2024)
- Lawrence Onoja (born 1948), military governor of Plateau State
- Mike Onoja, Nigerian businessman and public administrator
- Ogwu James Onoja (born 1968), Nigerian lawyer and notary
