= Idakwo Ameh Oboni II =

Àtá of Igala (1948–2020)

Àtá Idakwo Michael Ameh Oboni II
- His Royal Majesty

Monarch of Igala Kingdom
- In office: 10 March 2013 – 27 August 2020
- Predecessor: Attah Aliyu Ocheja Obaje
- Successor: Attah Matthew Alaji Opaluwa Oguche Akpa II
- Born: 1948; Idah, Northern Region, British Nigeria (now Idah, Kogi State, Nigeria)
- Died: 27 August 2020 (aged 71–72); Abuja, Nigeria
- Burial: Idah, Nigeria
Names
- Ìdákwó Ọm Àámẹ́-Óbòní
- House: Òhíémi Ọ̀bọgọ(Aju Òcholi)
- Father: Àtá Àámẹ́ẹ̀ Óbòní I
- Religion: Christianity
- Occupation: • Military officer • Civil servant • Àtá Ígáláà

Idakwo Michael Ameh Oboni II (1948 – 27 August 2020) was the 27th Àtá Ígálá (paramount ruler) of the Igala Kingdom in the Middle Belt of Nigeria.

== Life and education ==
Oboni II was born in 1948. In 1960, he completed his primary school education at Saint Boniface in Idah. He then advanced to Saint Augustine College, Kabba, where he graduated in 1967. He proceeded to Kaduna Polytechnic afterwards and graduated with a certificate in Estate Management in 1980.

== Working career ==
He then joined the Nigerian Air Force in 1968 and voluntarily left service in 1974. He later worked as land inspection officer in the Ministry of Lands in the then old Kwara State and left in 1975 in pursuit of education. In 1981, he joined the Federal Capital Development Authority (FCDA) and over the years, rose to the position of deputy director, retiring in 2006.

== Kingship ==
After the demise of the 26th Àtá Igala Àtá Àlíì Ọ̀chẹ́ja Òtúlúkpé Ọ̀bàje in 2012, Àámẹ́ was unanimously selected by the four ruling houses in Anẹ Ígálá as successor to the throne. His nomination was forwarded to the Nine (9) Igalamela Kingmakers as part of the traditional process. The Kingmakers endorsed his nomination for onward transmission to the Achadu oko-Ata (Igala Kingdom Prime Minister). His endorsement by the Igala Prime Minister was forwarded to the Kogi State Traditional Council and finally approved by kogi State Governor Capt Idris Ichala Wada. He confessed to be the first Ata to be married to a single wife in the history of Igala land.

With the coming of the Buhari administration in Nigeria, HRM Ameh Oboni II in 2016 in Idah, during the celebration of his third anniversary on the throne, tasked the president "to begin his change mantra in Kogi State".

After the 2019 electoral polls ensued by violence, the Àtá Ígálá placed ancestral curse on those who perpetrated those electoral violent acts in the state.

== Legacy ==
He was described as a man of peace and one who gave wise counsels and with a reputation for honesty. His son, Prince Ocholi Idakwo described him as "a man of action and one who was passionate about upholding the rich culture of Igala".

== Demise ==
He reportedly died on Thursday morning on 27 August 2020 after a brief reign of about eight years, which began after the death of his predecessor who reigned for 52 years. Oboni II died in an Abuja hospital after undergoing an unsuccessful pile operation.
