= Ibrahim Idris =

Nigerian politician (1949–2026)

Governor of Kogi State
- In office 5 April 2008 – 26 January 2012
- Deputy: Philip Salawu
- Preceded by: Clarence Olafemi (acting)
- Succeeded by: Idris Wada
- In office 29 May 2003 – 6 February 2008
- Deputy: Philip Salawu
- Preceded by: Abubakar Audu
- Succeeded by: Clarence Olafemi (acting)

Personal details
- Born: 3 January 1949 Idah, Northern Region, Colony and Protectorate of Nigeria (now in Kogi State, Nigeria)
- Died: 20 September 2026 (aged 77) United Kingdom
- Party: Peoples Democratic Party
- Spouse: Aisha Ibrahim Idris (m. 2017)
- Occupation: Politician; businessman

Ibrahim Idris (//; 3 January 1949 – 20 September 2026) was a Nigerian politician and businessman who served as the governor of Kogi State from 2003 to 2008 and from 2008 to 2012. He was a member of the Peoples Democratic Party (PDP).

Idris was succeeded by his brother-in-law Captain Idris Wada, who won election in December 2011 and took office in January 2012.

== Background ==
Ibrahim Idris was born in 1949 in Idah town, now in Idah Local Government Area of Kogi State. He started his primary education in 1954 in Onitsha, now in Anambra State. In 1962, he moved to Kano, where he completed his primary education in 1963. He moved to Buguma in Rivers State where he enrolled in King's Commercial College in 1964. He held a bachelor's degree from the University of Abuja.

After leaving school he launched the Ibro Trading Company, with interests in construction, furniture making, hotels and other activities. In 1970, he moved to Sokoto where he set up the Ibrahim Furniture Factory, the largest in Sokoto State, and later the Ibro Hotel, the first 3-star hotel in the old Sokoto State.

== Governor of Kogi State ==
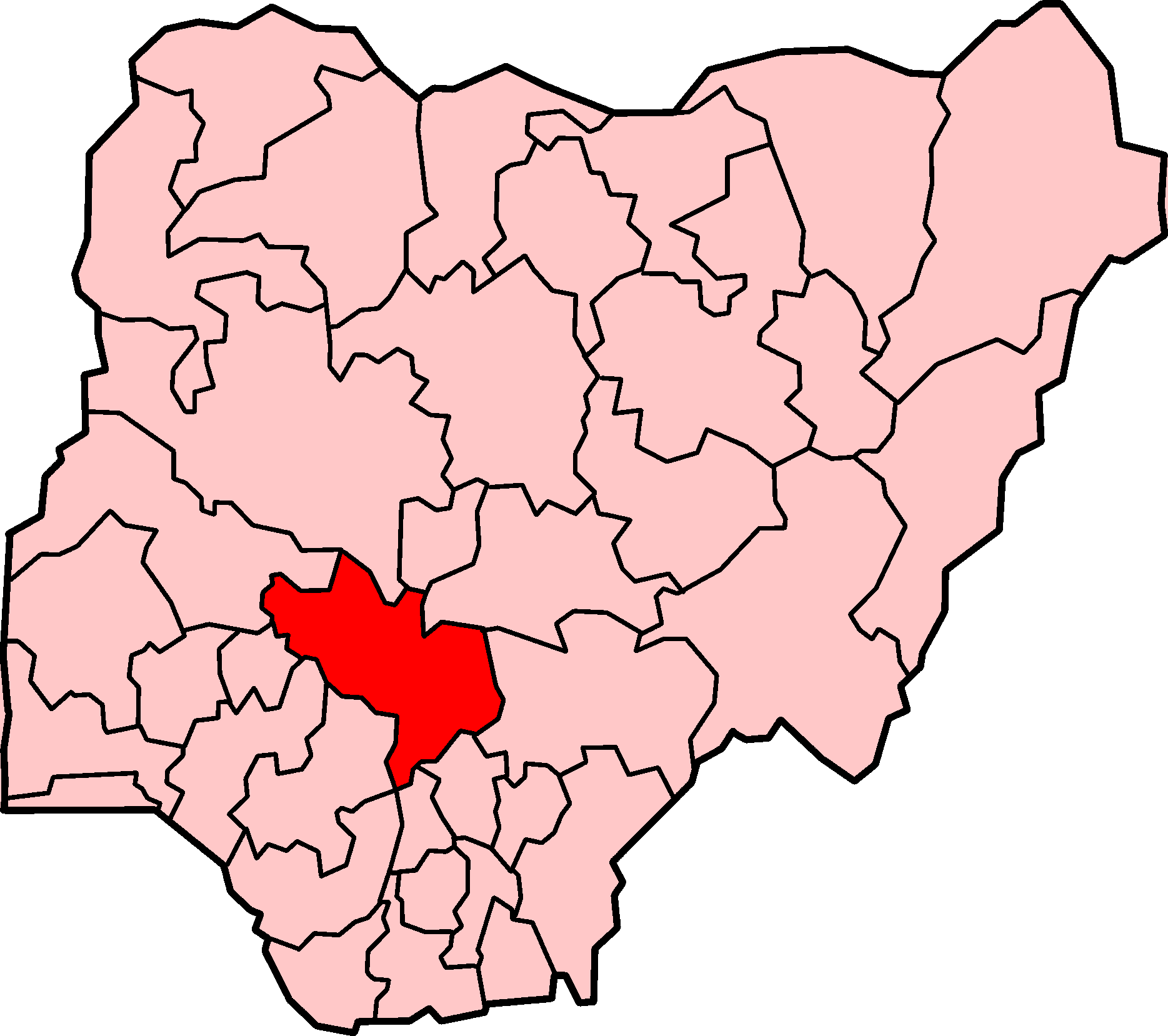
Kogi State in Nigeria

Idris, an Igala, emerged PDP governorship candidate for Kogi State in the 2003 Kogi State gubernatorial election after defeating an Ebira leader, Senator Ahmed Tijani Ahmed at the primaries of then ruling party in Nigeria at the federal level. He was elected governor of Kogi State on the PDP platform in April 2003, after beating then governor Prince Abubakar Audu of the All People's Party, APP. Ibrahim assumed office on 29 May 2003.

He was re-elected in April 2007, but was later nullified on the grounds that the Independent National Electoral Commission (INEC) had wrongly excluded the All Nigeria Peoples Party (ANPP) candidate Abubakar Audu from 14 April 2007 governorship poll. On 6 February 2008, the Court of Appeal upheld this ruling and ordered a new election to be held within three months. President Umaru Yar'Adua ordered the Speaker of the House of Assembly to take over as acting governor.

In a repeat election held on 29 March 2008, Idris was returned as the Governor of Kogi State. His opponent, Abubakar Audu, challenged the result of the by-election on the basis of massive electoral fraud including violence and theft of ballot boxes.

== ADC Airlines Flight 53 'miracle' ==
On the 29 October 2006 plane crash, his 3 daughters survived the accident along with six other people. About this he claimed: 'This is a superlative show of mercy to me and my family by Almighty Allah. I lack words to express my gratitude to the Almighty Creator for this favour. I can only call on Nigerians and indeed humanity in general to join me in thanksgiving for His benevolence'.

== Personal life and death ==
Idris was married to Hajiya Aisha Ibrahim Idris, whom he reportedly married in 2017, and they remained married until his death in 2026. He was previously married to Zainab Ibrahim Idris, who died on 31 May 2014 from a cancer-related ailment.

Idris died in the United Kingdom on 20 September 2026, at the age of 77.
