= Aliyu Obaje =

Traditional ruler in Kogi state, Nigeria

Àtá (Dr.) Àlíì Ọ̀chẹ́ja Ọ̀bàje(GCFR)
- His Eminence
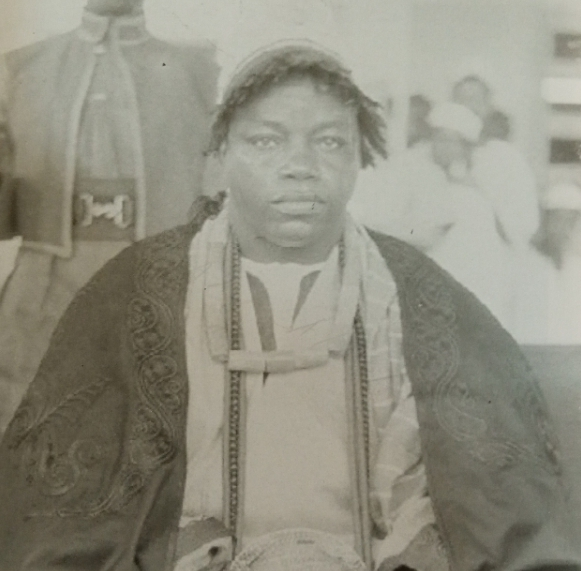

Monarch of Igala Kingdom
- In office: 2 November 1956 – 16 July 2012
- Predecessor: Àtá Akpoli Umaru Ameh Oboni I
- Successor: Àtá Idakwo Michael Ameh Oboni II
- Born: 1910
- Died: 16 July 2012 (aged 101–102)
- Burial: Idah
- Spouse: Hawa Obaje
- Issue: Kabba Ali Obaje; Abdullahi Adejo Obaje; Hadiza Obaje
Names
- Àlíì Ọ̀chẹ́ja Ọm Òtúlúkpé Ọ̀bàje
- House: Aju Ákwùmábì- Ìtódó Ádùgà branch
- Father: Òtúlúkpé Ọ̀bàje
- Mother: Alamii
- Religion: Islam
- Occupation: • Àtá Ígáláà

Àlíì Ọ̀chẹ́ja Ọ̀bàje GCFR (1910 – 16 July 2012) was the 26th Àtá Igala (paramount ruler) of the Igala Kingdom in Nigeria. Obaje reigned for 56 years making him one of the longest serving monarch in Nigeria's history.

== Life and kingship ==
Born in 1910, Aliyu Obaje was the youngest person to be installed ah Àtá Ígáláà; he mounted the stool at the age of 46 on 2 November 1956 following the death of his predecessor Ameh Oboni I. Obaje ruled for 52 years before he died at the age of 102. The Àtá's palace (the seat of power in the Igala Kingdom) is located in the ancient city of Idah.

He was one of the longest-serving monarchs in Nigeria. He has conferred on a large population of the Igala people traditional chieftaincy titles, including the title of Agenyi-Àtá of Igala Kingdom, bestowed on Chief Ogwu J. Onoja, SAN. Aliyu Obaje was the chairman of the Kogi State council of Traditional chiefs. He held the Nigerian national honour of GCFR (Grand Commander of the Federal Republic).

== Demise ==
He died on 16 July 2012.
