= Idakwo =

Nigerian given name

- Gender: Male
- Language: Igala

Origin
- Origin: Igala
- Meaning: the problem has ended
- Region of origin: North Central Nigeria

Idakwo is a Nigerian name of Igala origin, meaning "the problem has ended." It is traditionally given to a male child born when a specific problem has come to an end. The name is commonly used in Nigeria's North Central region.

== Notable people with the name ==
- Idakwo Ameh Oboni II (1948–2020), Ata of Igala
