= 2003 Kogi State gubernatorial election =

2003 gubernatorial election in Kogi State, Nigeria

- April 19, 2003
| Nominee | Ibrahim Idris | Abubakar Audu |
| Party | PDP | ANPP |
| Running mate | Philips Ozovehe Salanu | Patrick Adaba |
| Popular vote | 481,264 | 293,089 |
Governor before election
Abubakar Audu
ANPP
Elected Governor
Ibrahim Idris
PDP

The 2003 Kogi State gubernatorial election occurred in Nigeria on April 19, 2003. The PDP nominee Ibrahim Idris won the election, defeating Abubakar Audu of the All Nigeria Peoples Party.

Ibrahim Idris emerged PDP candidate. He picked Philips Ozovehe Salanu as his running mate. Abubakar Audu was the ANPP candidate with Patrick Adaba as his running mate.

== Electoral system ==
The Governor of Kogi State is elected using the plurality voting system.

== Primary election ==
=== PDP primary ===
The PDP primary election was won by Ibrahim Idris. He picked Philips Ozovehe Salanu as his running mate.

=== ANPP primary ===
The ANPP primary election was won by Abubakar Audu. He picked Patrick Adaba as his running mate.

== Results ==
A total number of 9 candidates registered with the Independent National Electoral Commission to contest in the election.

The total number of registered voters in the state was 1,158,343. Total number of votes cast was 911,265, while number of valid votes was 878,857. Rejected votes were 32,408.

| Candidate | Party | Votes | % |
|---|---|---|---|
| Ibrahim Idris | People's Democratic Party | 481,264 | 62.15 |
| Abubakar Audu | All Nigeria Peoples Party | 293,089 | 37.85 |
| Total | | 774,353 | 100.00 |
| Valid votes | | 774,353 | 95.98 |
| Invalid/blank votes | | 32,408 | 4.02 |
| Total votes | | 806,761 | 100.00 |
| Registered voters/turnout | | 1,158,343 | 69.65 |
Source: CCSU
