= Stephen Makoji Achema =

Nigerian politician (1947–1999)

- Born: June 15, 1947
- Died: November 6, 1999 (aged 52)

Stephen Makoji Achema // (born June 15, 1947; died November 6, 1999) is a Nigerian Politician and patriot of Igala extraction. He was born into the family of Andrew Achema Oyibo from Ayija clan of the Aleji dynasty (Igalamela king makers) on July 15, 1947, and died on 6th November, 1999.
