= 2008 Kogi State gubernatorial by-election =

Governor election in Nigeria

A by-election was held to elect a new governor of Kogi State on March 29, 2008.

The incumbent, Ibrahim Idris of the PDP, was re-elected to a second term in the 2007 general elections, but later in the year his election was nullified by Appeal Court due to a complaint to the Election Petitions Tribunal by Abubakar Audu, a former governor who was excluded by INEC from participating in the 2007 elections. On February 6, 2008, the Court of Appeal upheld this ruling and ordered a new election to be held within three months. President Umaru Yar'Adua ordered the Speaker of the Kogi State Assembly to take over as acting governor.

Idris re-ran for the governorship on the PDP ticket, challenging Abubakar Audu (ANPP), Ramat Momoh (PAC) and Yusuf Obaje (DPP).

== Results ==
Kogi State gubernatorial by-election, March 29, 2008
Party	Candidate	Votes
PDP	Ibrahim Idris	518,581
ANPP	Abubakar Audu	175,978
PAC	Ramat Momoh	1,529
Democratic People's Party	Yusuf Obaje	1,259
