= Oboni =

- Language: Igala

Origin
- Origin: Igala
- Meaning: "a child born with extra finger"
- Region of origin: North Central, Nigeria

Oboni is a traditional name specifically given to a child born with polydactyly (six fingers instead of five fingers). It is predominant among the Igala people of North Central Nigeria.

== Notable people with the name ==
- Idakwo Ameh Oboni II (1948–2020) Ata of Igala
- Onoja Oboni
