= Igala Kingdom =

Pre-colonial West African state

Igala Kingdom Anẹ Igáláà
- c. 16th century?–present
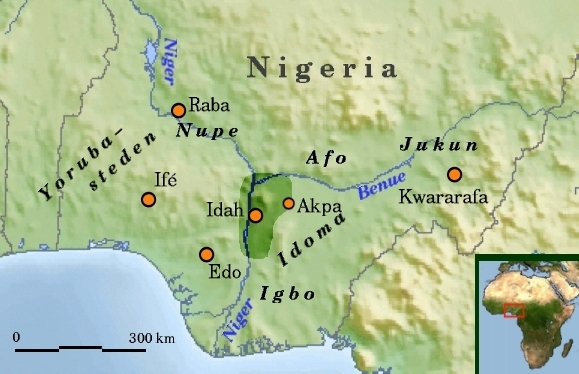
- Territory of the Igala Kingdom
- Status: Kingdom
- Capital: Idah
- Common languages: Igala
- Religion: Ojo
- Government: Absolute Monarchy
- Àtá
  - c. 16th century?: Àtá Ebulejonu(first)
  - 1876–present: Àtá Amẹh
- History
  - Established: c. 16th century?
  - Disestablished: present

Anẹ Igáláà (Igala Land), also known as the Igala Kingdom, is a traditional pre-colonial West African state, located at the eastern region of the confluence of River Niger and River Benue in the Middle Belt or North-central of Nigeria. The kingdom was founded by the Igala people, with the "Àtá" serving as the Igala king, national father and spiritual head, and the capital of Igala land is at Idah. The Igala Kingdom influenced and has been influenced by the Idoma, and Jukun, and is likely made up of descendants of these groups who settled and mixed with the native Igala populations.

== Igala linguistics ==
The etymology of the term "Igala" itself may be derived from "Iga" which means a partition, blockade, a dividing wall, and "Ala" which means "sheep". Iga-ala thus became Igala. The reason for this form of self-identification is currently debated by scholars. However, a possible theory designates the citizens of the kingdom as the sheep, and the state being the wall or defense that protects them.

In its native language, the people of Igala are known as àbó igáláà, its culture is known as ìchòlò or ùchòlò, and the Igala language is known as íchí Igáláà.

== Religion ==
The Igala traditional concept of God is a belief in the Supreme Being whom they call Ọjọ. Ọjọ is held so supreme, that out of his supremacy he gave powers and authorities to the gods and spirits over the different spheres of human life. These gods and spirits have practical dealings with human beings in their everyday life activities. Ifa is the traditional belief of the Igalas and is still practiced by many. This system of worship is predicated on a belief in, and honoring of ancestral spirits. Many communities, families, and individuals maintain shrines for the worship of deities and spirits. The traditional worship is known as " Icheboeche" while the worshippers are known as "Amachichebo" are called Custodians serve as medicinal practitioners, and are versed in oral traditional history and the use of herbs and plants to cure ailments.

Igalas regard God or Ọjọ́-chàmáchālāà as all-knowing and all seeing.

However, to access this God and also, to ascertain what He is saying per time, Ifa needs to be consulted.

To this end, all the demigods especially the natural elements of water and land are given sacrificial offerings periodically. This is done to gain their favour.

Another aspect of Faith amongst the Igalas is the Ibegwu, Ibo (people) egwu (dead). The spirits of the departed souls plays an important role in the various clans. It is believed that they see everything and know everything, hence, they are good in arbitration. The Ibegwu judges the actions of the living, especially in cases of land disputes, infidelity, family disputes and general conducts regarding sex and sexuality (Ibegwu forbids sex in day time, oral sex, brothers sharing same sex partners, etc.). However, Ibegwu is only potent on individuals whose families are connected to it. Families that have no ties with Ibegwu do not usually feel their impact. When Ibegwu judges a person of wrongdoing, the consequence is the manifestation of diseases that defies medical solution.

== Political structure ==
The Àtá's court is known as the Ogbede which is a building that that Àtá holds court within with its head being known as the Ogbe or president of court. The Amedibo are the royal servants and the Amonoji are Àtá's eunuchs. The symbols of power are the royal objects, including the oka (beads), okwu (neck-lace), robe (olawoni), red-cap (olumada), and otihi (flywhisk).. Other sacred objects are the Ejubejuailo (The Ata's pectoral Mask), Onunu-Ere (royal crown), Unyiale Ata (royal umbrella), Odechi / Okakachi (royal band), Oka kpai Okwu (royal beads) and the Akpa-Ayegba (the stool).

The Àtá himself or herself is in-charge of the major sacred objects, shrines and festivals of the Igala people.

The Ach'adu serves as the Chief executive. Another title associated with this post is Oko-Ata (Ata's traditional husband. Ach'adu itself means prime minister)

District Officers (onu) and provincial chiefs (Am'onu) were also in custody of their various shrines, grooves, sacred objects and festivals in their own domains. The hierarchy included District-heads (Am'onu-ane), clan heads (Gago), village heads (Omadachi) and youth leaders (Achiokolobia).

Among the Igalas, the titles of Ata and Achadu are held by only two people at the same time, while the titles of Onu, Achema, Akoji, Makoji, Eje, Onoja are used by multiple people at once. These titles may also be used as names. In many cases, these titles largely relate to occupations. For example, Gago which is clan leader, or Onoja being the head of the market. Names which are used as titles, such as Akoji and Makoji (which signify being a representative or substitute for the Ata) are given in hopes that the child would grow to attain such a lofty title. A strictly merit-based system is employed when giving out such titles.

== Ígáláà subdivisions ==
Anẹ Ígáláà has nine traditional ruling councils, including the capital Idah. The nine councils each has a King (onu) who is appointed by religious rite through a complex system of traditional rite and proceedings supervised by the head of the council, the Àtá Ígáláà in Idah. The seven Ígáláà councils are: Ankpa, Ajaka, Ugwolawo, Egume, Dekina, Omala, and Olamaboro Anyigba. Historically, each council had varying degrees of traditional administration which was based on tax collection from land holders, fishermen and market traders.

== Àtá ==
The first Àtá, the title given to the ruler of the kingdom, was Ebulejonu, a woman; she was succeeded by her brother Aganapoje, the father of Idoko. Idoko would later succeed him as Ata, and had two children Atiyele and Ayegba om'Idoko (Ayegba son of Idoko), Atiyele the first son of Idoko migrated eastward of the kingdom to establish Ankpa kingdom while Ayegba the second son of Idoko succeeded his father as Ata'IGala. He led a war against the Jukun, which resulted in victory. HRH Idakwo Micheal was appointed as the new Ata of Igala in December 2012. The position of Ata Igala rotates among four branches of the royal clan. The Igala kingdom was founded by Abutu-Eje in the 16th century. The kingdom was ruled by nine high officials called the Igala Mela who are custodians of the sacred Earth shrine. The Throne of the Ata is currently rotated among the clans of Aju Akogwu, Aju Amẹchọ, Aju Akwu, Aju Ocholi. "Aju" is meant to signify who the clan came from, as being the name of the ancestor of the clan.

== List of Àtá ==
Àji Àtá dynasty

- Aji-Ata (1507–1537)
- Olema I (1537–1567)
- Anogena (1567–1597)
- Agbo (1597–1627)
- Agọchi (1627–1657)
- Olema II (1657–1687)

Kwararafa Dynasty

- Abutu Ẹjẹ

Ata who ruled in the Independence Era

- Ebulẹjonu Ọm Abutu (f)
- Aganapoje Ọm Abutu
- Ìdoko Ọm Aganapoje
- Ayẹgba Ọm Ìdoko
- Akwumabi Ọm Ayẹgba (Onu) (Onakpa)
- Akogwu Ọm Ayẹgba
- Ocholi Ọgakọ Ọm Ayẹgba (Ohiemi Ọbọgọ)
- Agada Elame Ọm Ayẹgba
- Amẹh Achọ Ọm Akwumabi
- Itodo Aduga Ọm Akwumabi
- Ọgala Ọm Akogwu
- Idoko Adegbe Ọm Ocholi
- Onuchẹ Ọm Amẹh Achọ
- 1835: Ẹkẹlẹ Aga Ọm Ọgala
- 1835–1856: Amẹh Ocheje Ọm Ìtódó
- 1856–1870: Akwu Odiba Ọm Ìdoko
- 1870–1876: Okolíko Ọm Onuchẹ
- 1876–1900: Amẹh Agah Ọm Ẹkẹlẹ Agah

Ata who ruled during British occupation

- 1900–1903: Ocheje Amẹh Ocheje Ọm Amẹh Ocheje (a.k.a. Ocheje Nokwa)
- 1905–1911: Amẹh Oboni Akwu Ọm Odoba
- 1911–1919: Ogwuchẹ Akpah Ọm Okoliko
- 1919–1926: Atabọ Ijọmi Ọm Amaga
- 1926–1945: Ọbaje Ọm Ocheje
- 1945 – 23 June 1956: Amẹh Oboni Akpoli Ọm Oboní

Ata who ruled since Nigerian independence

- 20 October 1956 – 16 July 2012: Aliyu Ocheje Ọm Otulikpe Ọbaje - was installed by the British shortly before independence
- 10 March 2013 – 27 August 2020: Idakwo Ọm Amẹh Ọm Oboni
- 2021–present: Ọpaluwa Ọm Opaluwa Ogwuchẹ Akpah

== See also ==
- Igala people
- Idah
