= Clarence Olafemi =

Nigerian politician

Governor of Kogi State Acting
- In office 6 February 2008 – 29 March 2008
- Preceded by: Ibrahim Idris
- Succeeded by: Ibrahim Idris

Speaker, Kogi State House of Assembly
- In office 2008–2011

Personal details
- Born: Mopa-Muro, Kogi State, Nigeria
- Party: All Progressives Congress
- Other political affiliations: People's Democratic Party (1999–2019)

Clarence Olafemi is a Nigerian politician who was appointed acting Governor of Kogi State in February 2008, after the election of governor Ibrahim Idris was annulled. He handed back to Ibrahim Idris on 29 March 2008 after Idris had won a fresh election.

Olafemi was born in the Mopa-Muro Local Government Area of Kogi State. He is a graduate of Ahmadu Bello University, Zaria. He was a governorship candidate in the old Kwara State.

Olafemi was elected to the Kogi State house of assembly for the Mopamuro Constituency in April 2007 on the People's Democratic Party (PDP) platform. In September 2007, the Kogi State Election Petitions Tribunal in Lokoja nullified his election. He appealed this decision, and in February 2008, the Court of Appeal in Abuja upturned the judgement. In July 2008, he was called before the Economic and Financial Crimes Commission (EFCC) to explain his role in the alleged misappropriation of N12 billion belonging to the state.

In April 2010, he was an aspirant to become a candidate for the 2011 Kogi State governorship elections.
