= Igala people =

Ethnic group in Nigeria

Igáláà
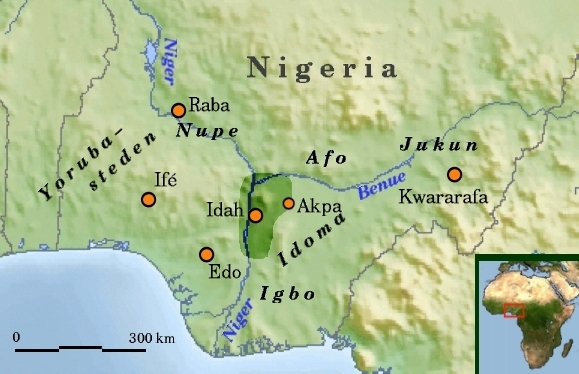
- Territory of the Igala Kingdom

Total population
- 2,600,000 (2020 estimate)

Regions with significant populations
- North Central Nigeria (Middle Belt), parts of Southern Nigeria

Languages
- Igala

Religion
- Predominantly Islam (Sunni); Minority Christian

Related ethnic groups
- Nupe, Yoruba, Idoma, Edo, Igbo, Jukun, Gbagyi

- People: Àbó Igáláà
- Country: Anẹ Igáláà

The Igala or Igara people are a West African ethnolinguistic group native to the region immediately south of the confluence of the Niger and Benue Rivers in central Nigeria. The area inhabited primarily by the Igala is referred to as Igalaland. Situated in an especially ecologically diverse region of Nigeria, the Igala have traditionally engaged in crop cultivation, and have been influenced culturally by many surrounding cultures over the centuries. Today, people of Igala descent are estimated to be at a population of over 2 million people.

The Igala kingdom is ruled ceremonially and culturally by the Attah and has a long history of political warfare and campaigns with neighbouring groups along the Benue. Igala people traditionally worship the supreme being Ojo, as well as their divine ancestral spirits. Masquerades are an important aspect of Igala art and a prime example of the kingdom's cultural exchange with its neighbouring groups. Igala art, dating centuries back, also feature in Nigerian body decoration and cultural architecture.

Today, the Igala predominantly inhabit southern and eastern Kogi State where they are the majority ethnicity and a major regional bloc in Kogi state politics. In times past, the Igala have held key state government positions.

While the present kingdom has diminished in size, Igala people and their culture have been an integral part of the formation of the communities along the Niger River, with many communities claiming an ethnogenesis from Idah, the ancestral home of the Igala. Minorities of the group exist in and are native to Edo, Delta, Anambra and Enugu states.

== Location ==
The Igala Kingdom expanded vastly beyond the present-day boundary. Their homeland, the former Igala Kingdom, is a triangular area of about 14,000 km^{2} (5,400 sq mi) in the angle formed by the Benue and Niger rivers. The area was formerly known as the Igala Division of Kabba province and is now part of Kogi State. Its capital was Idah, in Kogi state. The bulk of the Igala people reside in Kogi where they can be found in Idah, Igalamela/Odolu, Ajaka, Ofu, Olamaboro, Dekina, Bassa, Ankpa, Omala, Uloshi, Ifeku island, Iyelen Lokoja, Ibaji, and Ajaokuta Local Government. Smaller communities and enclaves exist in the surrounding regions and states along the Niger basin.

=== Geography ===
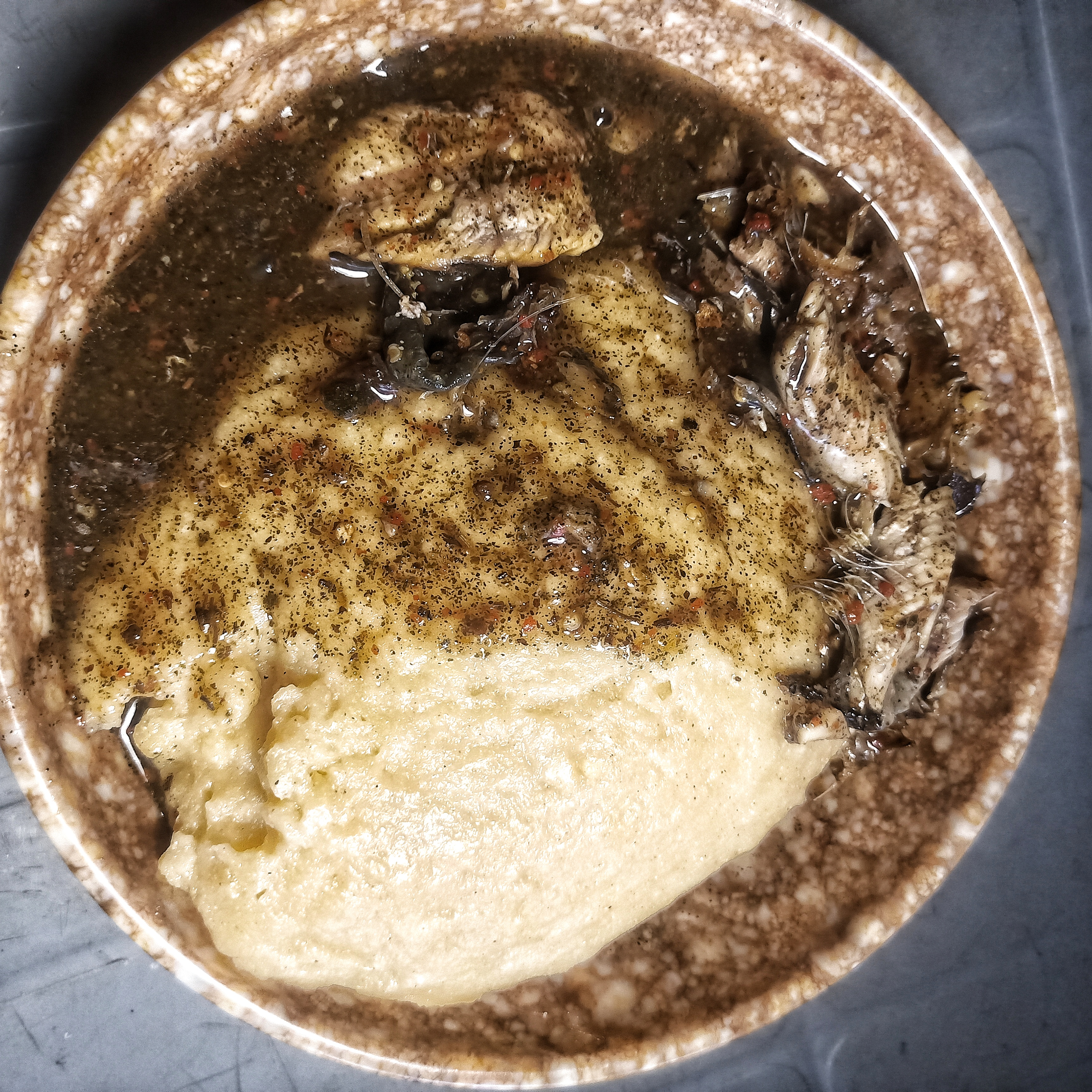
Black draw soup (ọrọ dudu/ọdọ egbe)

The geographical location played an important role in the development of the Igala Kingdom. Igala is situated between the apex of the Niger River and Benue River, with the capital, Idah, on the Niger River. Being located by the two main bodies of water in Nigeria brought an abundance of cultural influence from various communities such as Igbo, Yoruba, Edo, and Jukun. The Igala economy grew from trading, but traditionally, the Igala people valued farming and hunting for their goods. Igala is located across the undulating, forested coastal region, and the dry savannah; the Guinea forest-savannah mosaic. This diverse ecological setting accommodates rainfed crops (Yam, Cocoyam, Maize, Pumpkin, Cassava), as well as dry soil crops (Millet, Guinea corn, Beniseed, and Beans). Igala farmers, must be strategic with crop locations and the location of cultivar in various ecological locations. The Igala landscape is also conducive to hunting. These animals include the Buffalo, Antelope, and Wild pig.

== Culture ==
Basketry forms an important part of Igala material culture, reflecting the community’s adaptation to the riverine and agrarian environment of the Niger–Benue confluence. Artisans traditionally produce a variety of woven items, including storage containers, fishing traps, sieves, and carrying baskets used in farming and trade.

Locally available materials such as raffia palm, grasses, and flexible woody stems are commonly employed due to their durability and abundance. The techniques emphasize functional design, enabling baskets to withstand humid conditions and frequent use. In addition to practical purposes, certain woven forms may carry social or economic significance, particularly in local markets where basketry products are exchanged and sold.

== Government ==
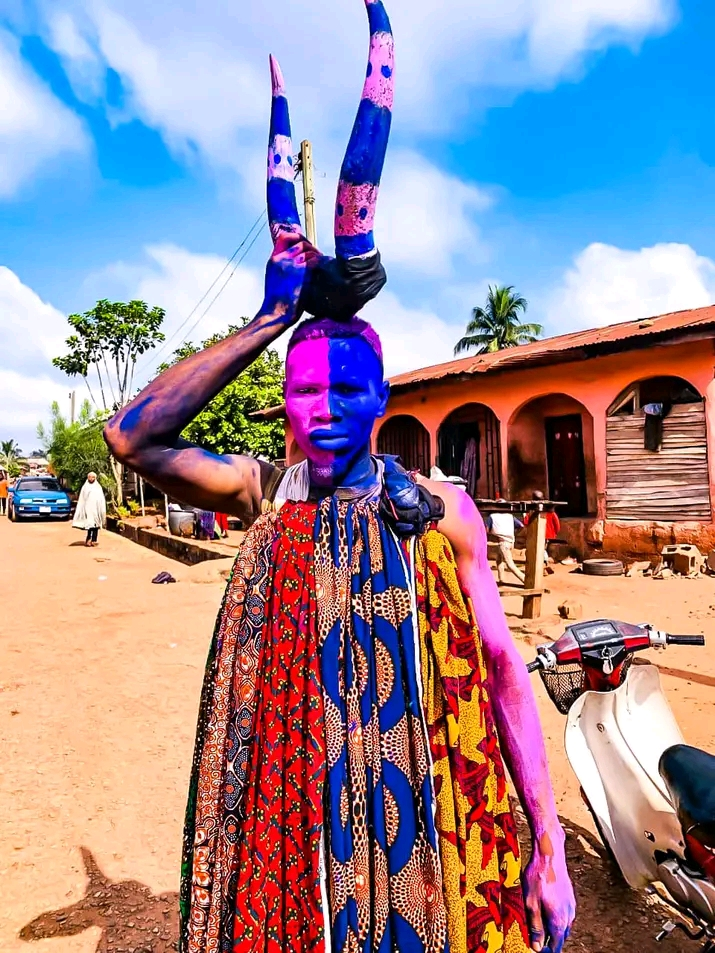
Participant in an Igala cultural festival

=== Igala Kingdom ===
The Igala kingdom was ruled by an "Attah", of all of whom Atta Ayegba Oma Idoko and Atta Ameh Oboni are the two most revered. In Igala lore, Oma Idoko is said to have offered his beloved daughter, Inikpi, by burying her alive to ensure that Igala won a war of liberation from Jukun dominance. Atta Ameh Oboni is known to have been very brave and resolute because of his stiff resistance against the British and struggle to uphold the ancient traditions of Igala land. He died by suicide in order to forestall the plans of the British, who wanted him deposed and exiled.

Idakwo Micheal Ameh II became the twenty-seventh Attah following the death of his predecessor Attah Alhaji Aliyu Obaje in 2012.

By Igala native law and custom, an Attah newly nominated by the four ruling royal houses (Aj'Ameacho, Aj'Aku, Aj'Akogu and Aj'Ocholi) is verified by the Igalamela Kingmakers, traditional chiefs of the Igala kingdom. The Igalamela kingmakers are made up of nine chiefs (Etemahi Igalamela, Agbenyo, Onubiogbo, Onede, Aleji, Okweje, Achadu Kekele Ukwaja, Ananya Ata, Achanya Ata) with Etemahi Igalamela as the head of the Kingmakers. The Kingmakers forward the nominated name to the prime minister of the Igala kingdom, known as the Achadu oko-ata, for onward approval by the Kogi State Government.

=== Igalaland ===
The word anẹ̀ Igala means Igalaland is regarded to be the territory where the people are speaking the Igala language. The early settlement in the Igala kingdom were founded by the ancestors of the people now known as the Igala-Mela with traditions that means "the nine Igala". The efunyi or ofigbeli was a large unit of settlement consisting of two or more clans under their am'onofe -unyi, the family heads. In these primary settlements, membership was strictly based on agnatic kinship ties such as Am'om'onobule, the am'ana, the in-laws, the am'adu, the domestic slaves were absorbed into the settlement on the understanding that they accepted their social and political limitations in certain issues.

=== Igala political crisis ===
The Igala Central Government became weak leading up to the mid-nineteenth century, and up to the point of being taken over by the British. The Igalaland saw a rise in rebellion from Idah; this meant a rise in independent colonies by subjects of the Attah. Prior to the rebellions, around 1826, political turmoil in Idah led to the exile of their leader at the time. This was followed by discourse in the election for the new Attah. Differing clans in the area were in dispute over who should take the throne because each clan supported a different lineage of kingship. The dispute over who would take on the role of the Attah led to economic and political rivalry among the various clans.

== Beliefs ==
=== Origin ===
It is an Igala legend that the Igalaland was discovered and founded by a hunter who found the area to be ideal for hunting. The legend says that the hunter's camp became the original grounds for the Igala settlement and his family carried on the lineage of the area. While this legend is not considered a concrete historical account, the story represents important aspects of Igala culture, especially in the importance of hunting. In fact, several of the villages take on names that represent the type of game that would be found there. This naming convention includes a village called Oju-Ocha, meaning, 'the place where guinea-fowl come to wash'. Hunting is so important to the Igala people that there are several hunting ceremonies that take place throughout the year. For example, the earth festival begins the start of the farming year. This ritual features a communal hunt where animal remains are offered to the earth shrine, grass being burnt, and the first yam being planted. In another ritual, the king camps in the bush the night before the festival. The king then spears an animal to offer to the national earth shrine.

=== Religion ===
The Igala people believe in a supreme creator referred to as Ọjọ. While Ọjọ is the highest ruler, he is considered to be so divine that he does not work among the human realm. Instead, Ọjọ bestows powers upon other gods to interact with everyday human life. Igala divine beings are organised into a three part hierarchy; gods, ancestors, and diviners. Igala ancestors are called Ibegwu. Ibegwu have a direct connection with Ọjọ, serving as his representatives and messengers. Ibegwu have the power to protect the well being of humans in their fertility, agriculture, and society. If the ancestors are not properly honored, they also have the ability to punish humans. Every year, before the yam harvest, ancestors are honored at the Ibegwu festival. This is to praise them for their protection in the past year, in hopes for more blessings in the year to follow.

=== Cosmology ===
The Igala people believe that there are three different realms the human spirit will occupy in their existence; life after birth, adult life, and life after death. The ancestral spirits are very important to the people of the mortal world. It is the goal of the Igala people to maintain a balanced relationship with their ancestors by honouring them through rituals and offerings. If properly honoured, the ancestors will offer blessings and protection to the living. Ancestral spirits interact with the living in various ways. The spirits can be reincarnated as babies, or be called upon through masquerades.

In Igala cosmology, a human is not left to decide their destiny. It is believed that before a person is born, their destiny is decided by a choice they make before the creator, Ojo in the spirit world. When a person dies, it is very important that their body is treated with the proper ritual practices to ensure that they will make it to the spirit world; this is accomplished through a burial ceremony that has three stages. The first stage of the burial ceremony is called Egwu omi omi eji -When the body is placed into the grave. The second stage is the ceremony that takes place after the deceased is buried, called ubi eche. The third stage is Akwu eche, meaning the last shedding of tears. The third stage is where the Oloja masquerade is performed to say goodbye to the deceased.

== Art ==
=== Masquerades ===
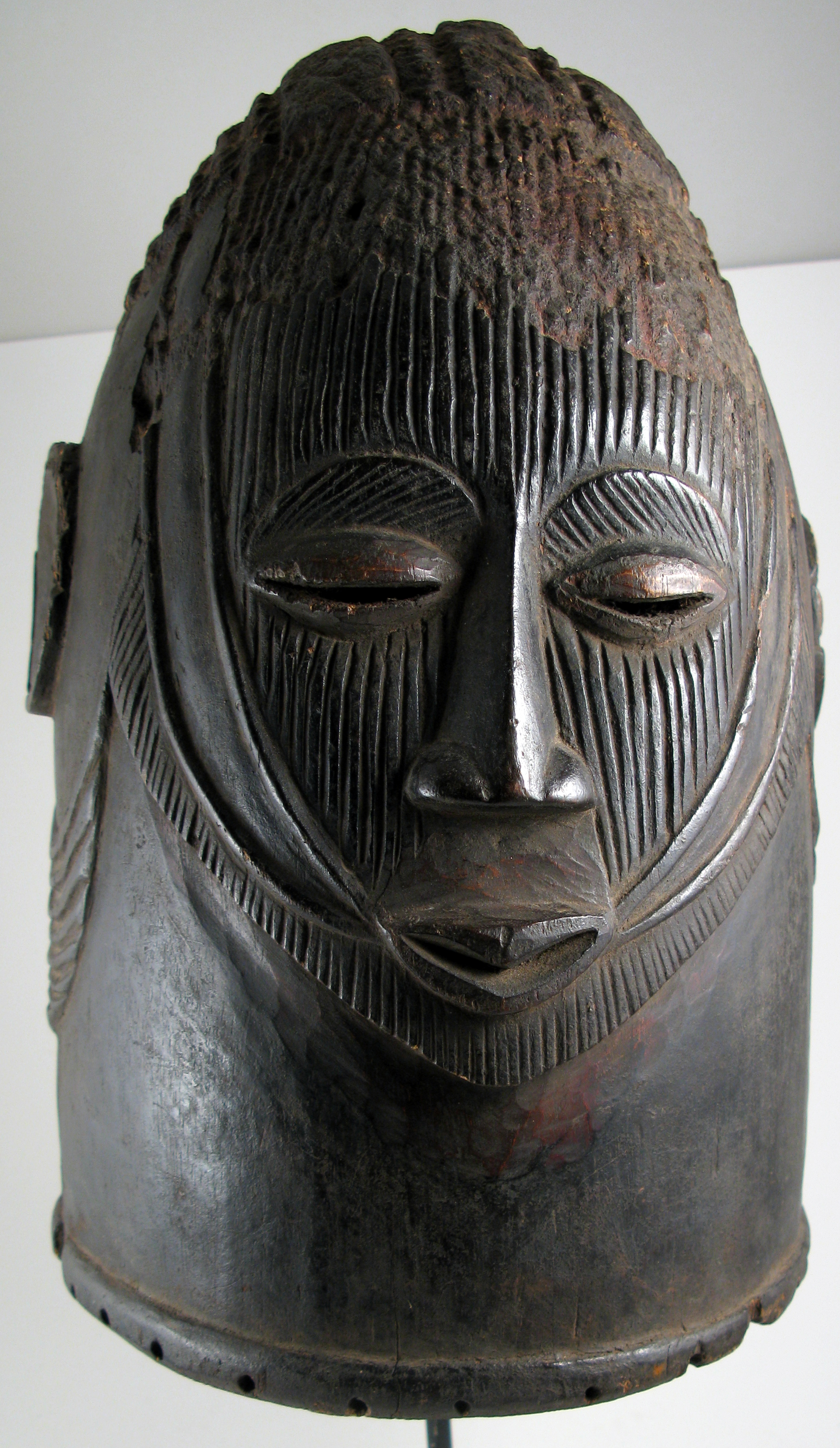
Igala helmet mask, Nigeria

Masks are an important aspect of Igala art. Masquerades are rituals that aim to create a balanced relationship between the world of the living, and the ancestors of the spiritual realm. Igala masks feature symbolic markings that are meaningful in identifying political status and the culture's fashion. Because these markings are not strict for each culture, and fashion changes over time, it is difficult for historians to rely on them to identify their place of origin. Igala masks have influences from several bordering regions including Igbo, Edo, and Idoma.

While these masks very across regions, they share some similarities, such as the first Atta appearing as a leopard. Igala masquerade culture would not have been able to flourish without the economic support from trade controlled by the Igbo in the lower Niger River. Igala brass masks, worn by the Atta, show evidence of Benin influence on Igala masks. It is presumed that this influence came from Igala being under suzerainty of Benin during the reign of Esigie.

Researchers have found that some Igala masks were actually from the Jukun region. This could mean that the masks were taken, or left behind by Jukun warriors on the Igala-Jukun battlefield.

==== Oloja masquerade ====
One masquerade in particular is the Oloja masquerade. Oloja is a five day burial ceremony specifically for older, deceased men. Led by elders, this ceremony takes place once a year and can honor one, or several deceased members of the community in the third and final part of the burial ceremony, Akwu eche. The body of the deceased is adorned with what is known as achi. Achi is woven materials including strips of raffia palm leaves (Iko), and strips of cloth. The Oloja dancer wears a wooden headdress made to look somewhat like a crocodile with fierce teeth and a protruding jaw. Music is an important part of the Oloja ceremony. The instrumentalists are elders. They use instruments such as wooden gongs, metal gongs, rattles, flute, and seven drums of various sizes. The start of the ceremony is signaled by the lead instrumentalist blasting seven notes on the flute, each note louder than the one before it, eventually being joined by the other musicians. At this point, the elders take turns performing a dance until another seven notes are signalled by the flute, summoning the Oloja dancer. The dancer performs movements that mimic different aspects of the deceased's occupation, personality, or habits. The dancer will then go to the house of deceased and throw part of the thatched roof into the bush or river. Next, the masquerader collects the tools of the deceased and destroys them in the performance arena. In the final part of the dance, the dancer collects the Okega, or personal god of the deceased, takes snuff into his nostril three times, hits the back of his head three time, and performs the three final dance moves. By the end of the ceremony, community members are left to cry while the dancer is taken back to his abode.

=== Body decoration ===
Body decoration is the act of altering one's skin or body through piercing, scarification, tattooing, skin dyes, or painting for the purpose of aesthetic or social identification. In Igala culture, the practice of decorating the body is known as Ina Ole.

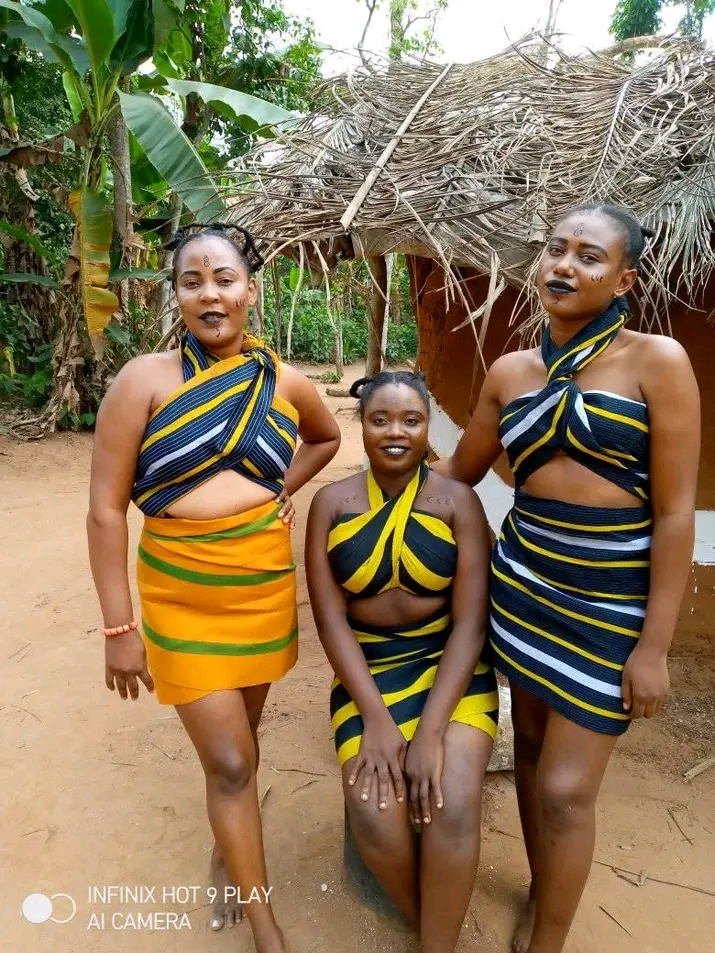
Igala women wearing Achi Igala (Igala cultural attire), and facial paint

One form of permanent skin alterations is scarification. This is done by cutting the surface of the skin to leave raised marking. In Igala culture, most parts of the kingdom, like Ankpa, recurved three deep horizontal cuts on each side of their face beside the mouth as a way of identifying each other. This practice, which was prevalent during inter - tribal wars in the 17th century and 18th century has now become very uncommon among the Igala people. The practice of scaring the skin can also be seen as medicinal and spiritually healing.

There are also several non permanent forms of Ina Ole, such as creating designs with paint or dyes. These designs take on different meanings depending on the person, occasion, or placement on the body. For example, some tribal markings are identified by their placement on the face, or the chest of men. Women often decorate their wrists and arms as a statement of beauty. Some designs are designated for specific ceremonies or public events while others are spontaneous. These impromptu designs often speak to socio-cultural messages or are the result of young members scribbling their names in patterns on the body. There are also many different symbols used in the decorations including combs, rings, or the alphabet.

=== Film ===
The Nigerian film industry has grown tremendously in the last three decades. This progress in acceptance and recognition for Nigerian film is due to the successful 1992 production, Living in Bondage. The objective for many Nigerian and Igala filmmakers is to bring African film into the same light as industries in Western countries. The Nigerian and Igala film industries are often referred to as Nollywood, or Igawood. These titles are sometimes viewed as controversial as they imply a sense of otherness, further alienating Nigerian film industries. On the other hand, many Igala filmmakers accept the title as the essence of movie making in their country, and being included in part of the global filmmaking experience.

Many Igala filmmakers strive to preserve traditional Igala culture in their films. For example, many characters will be named in Igala language after what their character represents. This teaches viewers the Igala language by forming associations with character names and their characteristics. The purpose of this is to preserve the Igala language so it does not go extinct due to the globalization of Igala culture.

The Igala film industry has faced many challenges that have caused it to be less successful than other Nigerian and Western film industries. On challenge, is that Igala film has had a lack of presence on satellite television networks. Having a strong tv presence is important for gaining exposure and global interest. Another issue faced in Igala film is the lack of profit. Many of these films are low budget, and therefore not sought after as much as films that bring in a higher revenue. This makes it difficult for Igala film makers working toward cultural preservation, as well as global exposure. Finance has also proven to be an issue in this industry because there is little access to technical training for workers in this industry.

== Notable Igala people ==
- Abubakar Audu
- Aliyu Obaje
- Edward David Onoja
- Emmanuel Dangana Ocheja
- Ibrahim Idris
- Idris Wada
- Jeremiah Attaochu
- Joseph Benjamin
- Lucy Jumeyi Ogbadu
- Ogwu James Onoja
- Praiz
- Stephen Makoji Achema
- Aminu Umar
- Ilebaye
- Sule Iyaji
- Francis Idachaba
- Saida Boj
- Alex Kadiri
- Ibrahim Ogohi
- Peter Ebiloma
- Ojochogu Joseph
- Positive
- Muhammad Adama
- Ilemona John
- professor Gabriel oyibo
- Dr. Ibrahim wada
- Dr Jeremiah Ojonemi Abalaka
