= Ogwu James Onoja =

Nigerian legal practitioner

Ogwu Onoja, SAN
- Born: 19 February 1968 (age 58); Idah, Kogi State, Nigeria
- Occupations: Legal practitioner, notary public

Ogwu James Onoja, SAN, FCArb, born 19 February 1968 in Idah, Kogi State, is a legal practitioner and notary public with the Supreme Court of Nigeria. Onoja has authored several publications on legal and social subjects in Nigeria, including The Supreme Court Rules: Practice and Procedure and The Court of Appeal Rules: Practice and Procedure, both published in 2010; the Federal High Court Rules: Practice and Procedure, volumes 1 and 2, published in 2012; and Fundamental Rights (Enforcement Procedure) Rules, 2009 published in 2021.

== Birth and education ==
Onoja was born to Deacon Job Idoko Onoja and Mary Omada Onoja. He began his formal education in 1976 at the local school board, Okpo, and finished at LGEA primary school in Ofante for his ordinary-level West African school certificate from 1980 to 1985. He proceeded to the School of Basic Studies, Makurdi, Benue State, and obtained his Advanced Level Certificate (IJMB) from 1985–1987, and thereafter went to the University of Jos, Plateau State, where he obtained his Bachelor of Laws (LLB) (Hons) degree from 1987–1990. From 1990–1991, he was at the Nigerian Law School Lagos campus for his Barrister at Laws (BL) Certificate, which is a postgraduate and compulsory professional qualification to practice law in Nigeria. He was called to the Nigerian Bar on 10 October 1991. He did his compulsory National Youth Service corps at Nkwere Local Government Council in the old Imo State of Nigeria between 1991 and 1992 service years. Between 2000 and 2001, Onoja was at the University of Calabar for his Postgraduate Diploma in Management, and between 2001 and 2002, he also obtained his Master of Business Administration degree also from the University of Calabar.

== Legal career ==
Onoja started his legal career with the firm Humphrey Adah & Co. in Lagos, from 1992 to 1996. He was on his own as principal solicitor at Onoja Consulting Solicitors before proceeding to the University of Lagos for his Master of Laws (LLM) degree between 1996 and 1997. From 1997 to 2000, he was with T.J. Onomigbo Okpokpo & Co., ad senior counsel. In 2000, Chief Onoja started another law firm, O.J. Onoja & Associates (incorporating Onoja Consulting Solicitors), and as principal solicitor, he represented individuals and corporate organisations in Nigeria in all levels of courts of record, arbitrary panels and other out-of-court negotiations.

Onoja has attended several legal and academic conferences and workshops in Nigeria and abroad. He is a non-executive director of the following companies: Goomeej Nigeria Limited, Laser Guards Limited, Lugard Insurance Brokers Limited, Lugard Beach Hotels Limited, Lugard Realtors and Investment Limited, Lugard International School Limited, Lugardgate Ltd., Forte Lugard Ltd., Lugard Garrison Engineering Ltd., Bar and Bench Publishers Ltd, amongst others.

Onoja is a member of the Nigerian Institute of Management, Fellow of the Nigerian Chartered Institute of Arbitrators, Fellow of the Nigerian Institute of Chartered Arbitrators, Member of the Nigeria Bar Association, Abuja and Lokoja, Fellow of Certified Cost Management, Fellow of Institute of Directors Nigeria and UK, and Member of Capital Market Consultants with Security and Exchange Commission.

Onoja was appointed a Notary Public of Nigeria in 2008, while on 12 July 2012, he was elevated to the prestigious rank of Senior Advocate of Nigeria (SAN) on the platform of litigation and appearances at all level of courts in Nigeria. In recognition of his contribution to the development of the legal profession, the Honourable Chief Justice of Nigeria, W.S.N. Onnoghen, appointed Onoja as a member of the Legal Practitioners Privileges Committee, the body responsible for the appointment and discipline of Senior Advocates of Nigeria.

He is currently the President of the Bar and Bench International Institute for Arbitration, an institute established for the resolution of disputes and the practice of alternative dispute Resolution. BBIIA provides education and training for arbitrators, mediators and adjudicators. It also acts as a global hub for practitioners, policy makers, academics and those in business, supporting the global promotion, facilitation and development of all ADR methods.

BBIIA offers a range of resources including guidance, support, advice, networking and promotional opportunities, as well as facilities for hearings, meetings and other events.

== Book authorship ==
He is also a noted author of legal textbooks including:

1. The Supreme Court Rules: Practice and Procedure (2010).

2. The Court of Appeal Rules: Practice and Procedure (2010).

3. Federal High Court Rules: Practice and Procedure, volumes 1 and 2 (2012).

4. Fundamental Rights (Enforcement Procedure) Rules, 2009 (2021).

5. Hon. Justice Ejembi Eko Dissents: A Collection and Comments on his Lordship's Dissenting Judgments at the Supreme Court of Nigeria (2022).

6. The Essence of Time in the Administration of Justice: Commentaries, Rulings and Papers of Hon. Justice Ibrahim N. Buba Federal High Court 2004-2023 (2023).

7. The Priest With a Gavel: The Memoir and Selected Judgments of Hon. Justice Tom Yakubu, JCA (2023).

== Philanthropic work ==
He is a first-class beaded chief, holding the traditional chieftaincy title of Agenyi Attah of Igala Kingdom, meaning "Attah Igala's confidant." He is the Chairman, Board of Trustees, Igala Heritage Foundation, Member, Kogi East Elders' Council, Council Member, Ojuju Agbadufu Igala, Patron of Igala Cultural Development Association, Member, Board of Trustees, Ofante Community Self Help Association, Member, Board of Trustees Arewa, Traditional Title Holders Association, Member, Board of Trustees, Igala Traditional Chiefs Forum, FCT, Abuja, amongst others. Chief Onoja, SAN, is the Pioneer recipient of the Igala Man of the Year Award for 2017. In 2018, he received the Arise Igala Lifetime Achievement Award and the Chateko (HELPER) of the Year 2018 Award from the Oma Igala Voice. On August 1, 2020, he was conferred the title of Acheee of Igala Kingdom, which qualifies him to use the first-class status of CIK after his name. He was recently awarded the title 'Daddy General' by the Igala Singles Co-operative Forum as an expression of appreciation for his initiative, 'Annual Wedding Suit and Agbada Palliative', an annual event aimed at supporting 50 young intending Igala couples (100 singles) with a suit, agbada, or wedding Gown as a contribution to their wedding.

He is the Board Secretary, World Mission Partnership Forum, the Evangelism Arm of God’s Care Mission, Okpo, Chairman, Sharonrose African Child Foundation, the Co-Founder, Deacon Job and Mrs. Omada Onoja Foundation, and Founder, Unyi-Ogugu Football League. He is a two-time recipient of Kogi State Social Media ‘Most Outstanding Philanthropist’ awards for 2019 and 2022. He was presented with an International Award of recognition as the Ambassador of Family Values in appreciation of his long-standing sponsorship and significant commitment to the Big Family Pageant Africa & Children Climate Action Project. At the 7th Inter-House Sports Competition of NOWA Secondary School, Karshi, he was also presented with an award in recognition of his support to the school.

He was ordained a deacon of the United Evangelical Church, formerly known as Qua Iboe Church, on 14 August 2022, at the UEC, Alafor Ofante Centre. He obtained his Ph.D. in law from the Faculty of Law, Nasarawa State University, Keffi, in 2022. On 3 December 2022, he was conferred with the honour of Distinguished Service Star of Rivers State for his extraordinary achievements and contributions to the development of Rivers State and Nigera by His Excellency, Nyesom Ezenwo Wike, CON, GSSRS, the Governor of Rivers state.

== Personal life ==
He is married to Rosemary (nee Negedu), a chartered accountant, and they have five children: Edebo, Umola, Idoko, Ufedo, and Idoga. His interests include reading biographies, football, travelling, lawn tennis, and golf. He maintains ties with his communities in Ofante and Ogugu and participate in local activities.

On 27 October 2024, Ogwu is planned to be ordained an elder in the United Evangelical Church (UEC).
