= Idah =

- LGA and town
- Interactive map of Idah
- Location in Nigeria
- Coordinates: 7°05′52″N 6°44′36″E
- Country: Nigeria
- State: Kogi State

Government
  - Local Government Chairman: Amade Egwude Ochijenu

Area
  - Total: 36 km^{2} (14 sq mi)

Population (2006 census)
  - Total: 79,815
  - Density: 2,200/km^{2} (5,700/sq mi)
- Time zone: UTC+1 (WAT)
- Postal code: 2
- 3-digit postal code prefix: 271
- ISO 3166 code: NG.KO.ID

Idah is a town in Kogi State, Nigeria, on the eastern bank of the Niger River in the middle belt region of Nigeria. It is the headquarter of the Igala Kingdom, and also a Local Government Area with an area of 36 km^{2}. Idah had a population of 79,815 at the 2006 census.

== History ==
The town is the traditional capital of the Igala Kingdom, whose traditional ruler, the Attah Igala, is currently Matthew Alaji Opaluwa Oguche Akpa II. Idah is an important fishing port and Market trading town in Nigeria with an outpost of the Nigeria Navy referred to as Nigeria Navy Ship Lugard. The town as a port of trade was frequented by local and foreign traders who traded agricultural produces and minerals mostly. Bronze rings and Cowries were the predominant currency for trade.

== Geography ==
Idah, an old river port, lies on the eastern bank of the river Niger at 7°05′00″N 6°45′00″E.

== Economy ==
The town is a major food supplier of Kogi State. It has commercial routes on the river Niger linking Lokoja, the Kogi state capital; to the north of the country and Onitsha in Anambra state) to the south, Agenebode Edo State across the Niger to the west. Its population is primarily Igala.

== Education ==
Idah hosts a federal polytechnic. It also hosts the college of science, health and Technology.

== Climate ==
The rainy season in Idah is uncomfortable and cloudy, the dry season is moist and slightly cloudy and often hot throughout the year. The temperature over the course of the year usually varies from 66 °F to 92 °F and is hardly below 60 °F or above 97 °F.

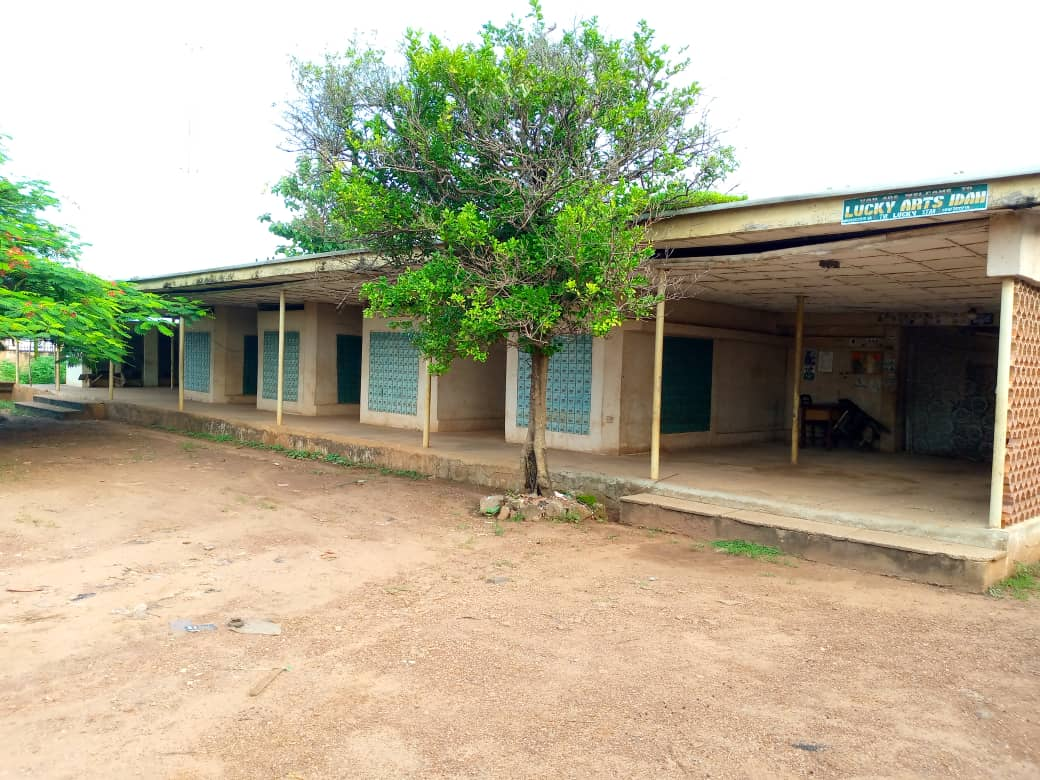
Post office in Idah

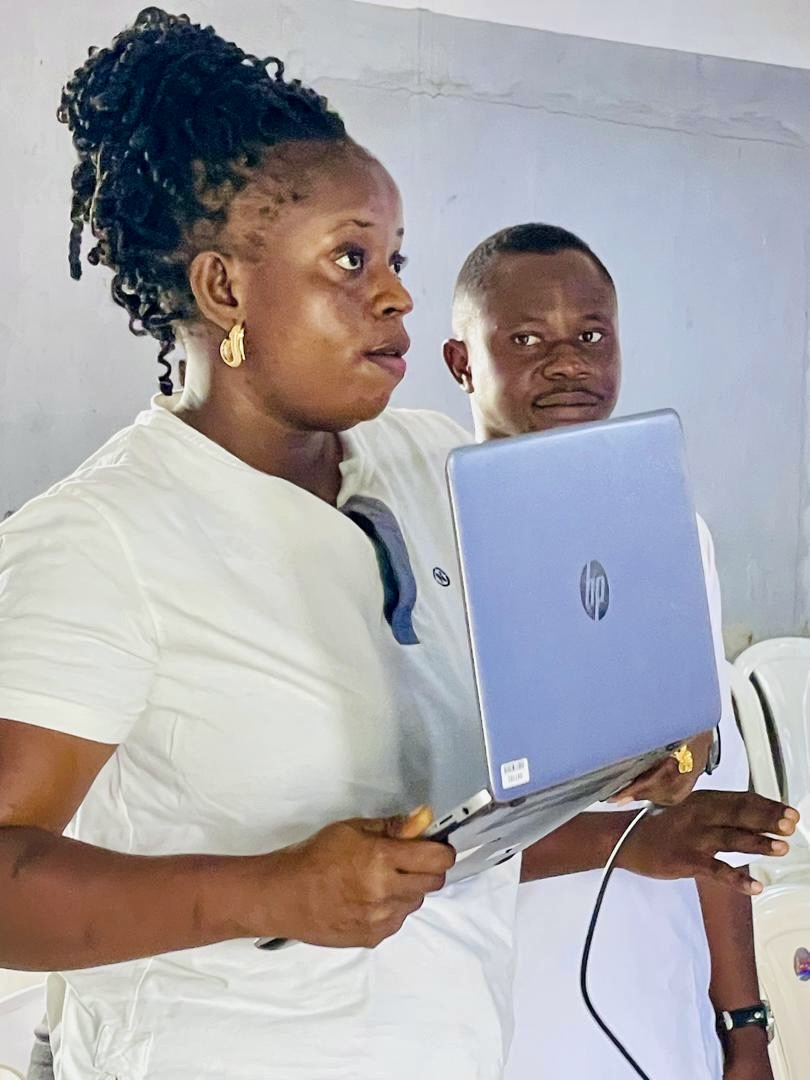
Outreach picture at Idah

== Wards ==
1. Igalaogba
2. Owoliapa
3. Irecheba
4. Ukwaja
5. Ogegele
6. Ede
7. Sabongari
8. Ega
9. Ugwoda
10. Ichala
