= Outline of Nigeria =

Country in West Africa

The Flag of Nigeria

The location of Nigeria

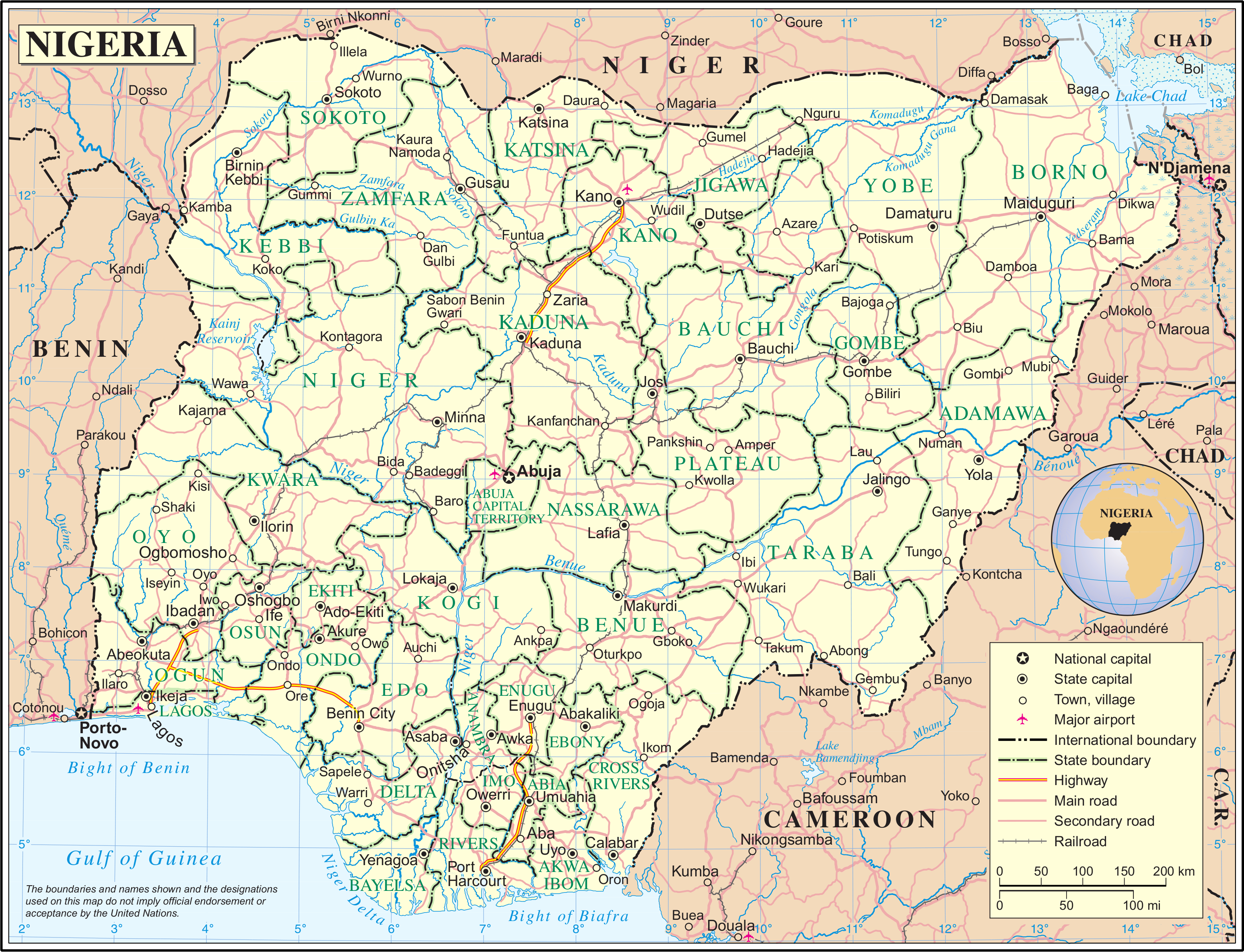
An enlargeable map of the Federal Republic of Nigeria

Federal Republic of Nigeria – sovereign country located in West Africa. Nigeria is a federal constitutional republic comprising thirty-six states and one Federal Capital Territory. Nigeria borders the Republic of Benin in the west, Chad and Cameroon in the east, and Niger in the north. Its coast lies on the Gulf of Guinea, part of the Atlantic Ocean, in the south. The capital of Nigeria is Abuja.

The people of Nigeria have an extensive history, and archaeological evidence shows that human habitation of the area dates back to at least 9000 BC. The Benue-Cross River area is thought to be the original homeland of the Bantu migrants who spread across most of central and southern Africa in waves between the 1st millennium BC and the 2nd millennium.

Nigeria is the most populous country in Africa and the eighth most populous country in the world with a population of over 140 million. The country is listed among the "Next Eleven" economies, and is one of the fastest growing in the world with the International Monetary Fund projecting growth of 9% in 2008 and 8.3% in 2009.

The following outline is provided ur as an overview of and topical guide to Nigeria:

== States in Nigeria ==
There are thirty six states in Nigeria which include the following

- Abia
- Adamawa
- Akwa ibom
- Anambra
- Bauchi
- Bayelsa
- Benue
- Borno
- Cross river
- Delta
- Ebonyi
- Edo
- Ekiti
- Egugun
- Gombe
- Imo
- Jigawa
- Kaduna
- Kano
- Kastina
- Kebi
- Kogi
- Kwara
- Lagos
- Nasarawa
- Niger
- Ogun
- Ondo
- Osun
- Oyo
- Pleatue

== General reference ==
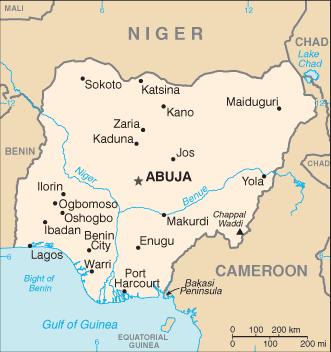
An enlargeable basic map of Nigeria

- Pronunciation: /naɪˈdʒɪəriə/
- Common English country name: Nigeria
- Official English country name: The Federal Republic of Nigeria
- Common endonym(s):
- Official endonym(s):
- Adjectival(s): Nigerian
- Demonym(s): Nigerian(s)
- ISO country codes: NG, NGA, 566
- ISO region codes: See ISO 3166-2:NG
- Internet country code top-level domain: .ng

== Geography of Nigeria ==
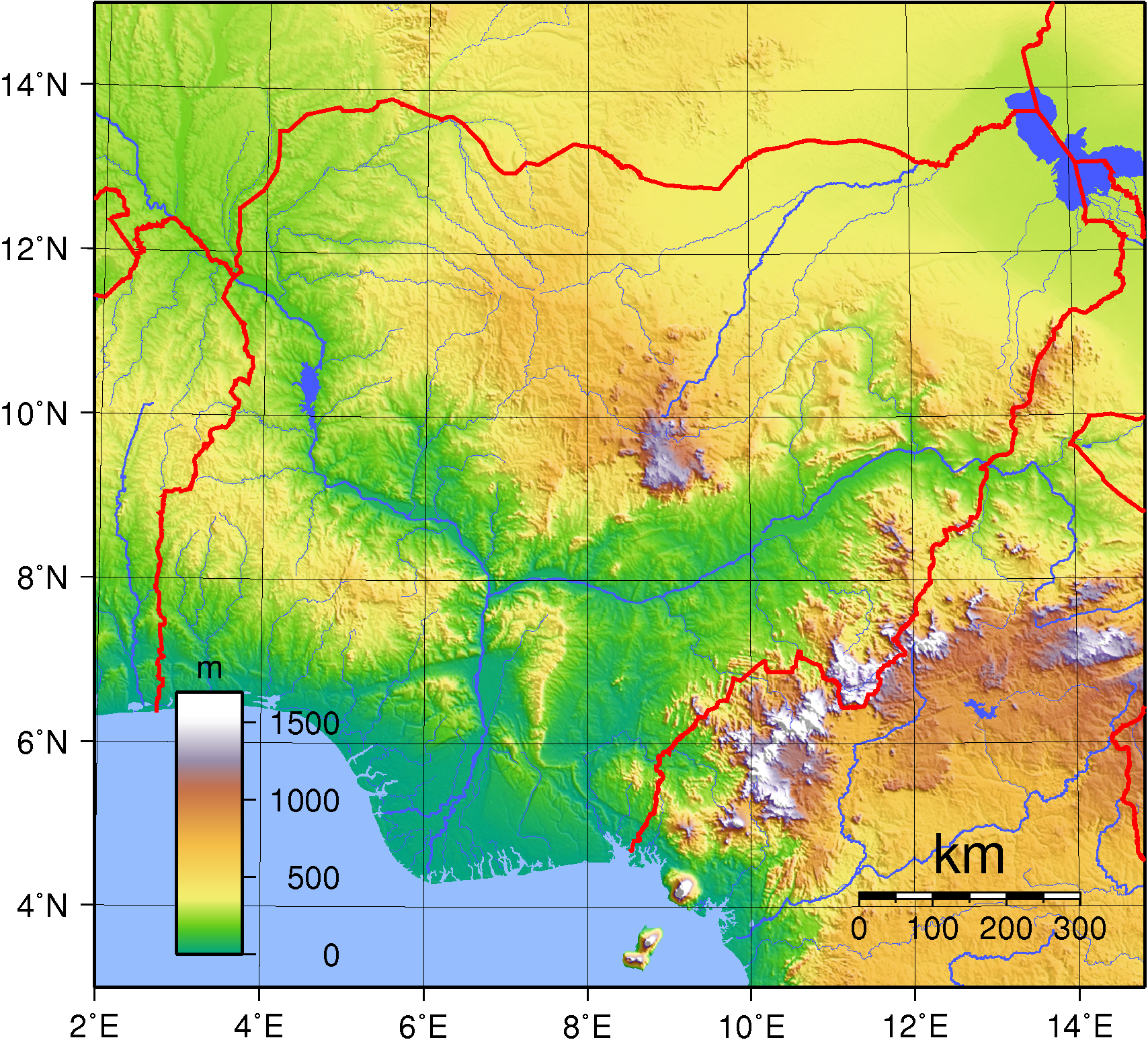
An enlargeable topographic map of Nigeria

Geography of Nigeria

- Nigeria is: a country
- Population of Nigeria: 148,093,000 - 8th most populous country
- Area of Nigeria: 923,768 km^{2}
- Atlas of Nigeria

=== Location ===
- Nigeria is situated within the following regions:
  - Northern Hemisphere and Eastern Hemisphere
  - Africa
    - West Africa
- Time zone: West Africa Time (UTC+01)
- Extreme points of Nigeria
  - High: Chappal Waddi 2,419 m (7,936 ft)
  - Low: Lagos Island −0.2 m (−1 ft)
- Land boundaries: 4,047 km

Cameroon 1,690 km
Niger 1,497 km
Benin 773 km
Chad 87 km

- Coastline: Gulf of Guinea 853 km

=== Environment of Nigeria ===
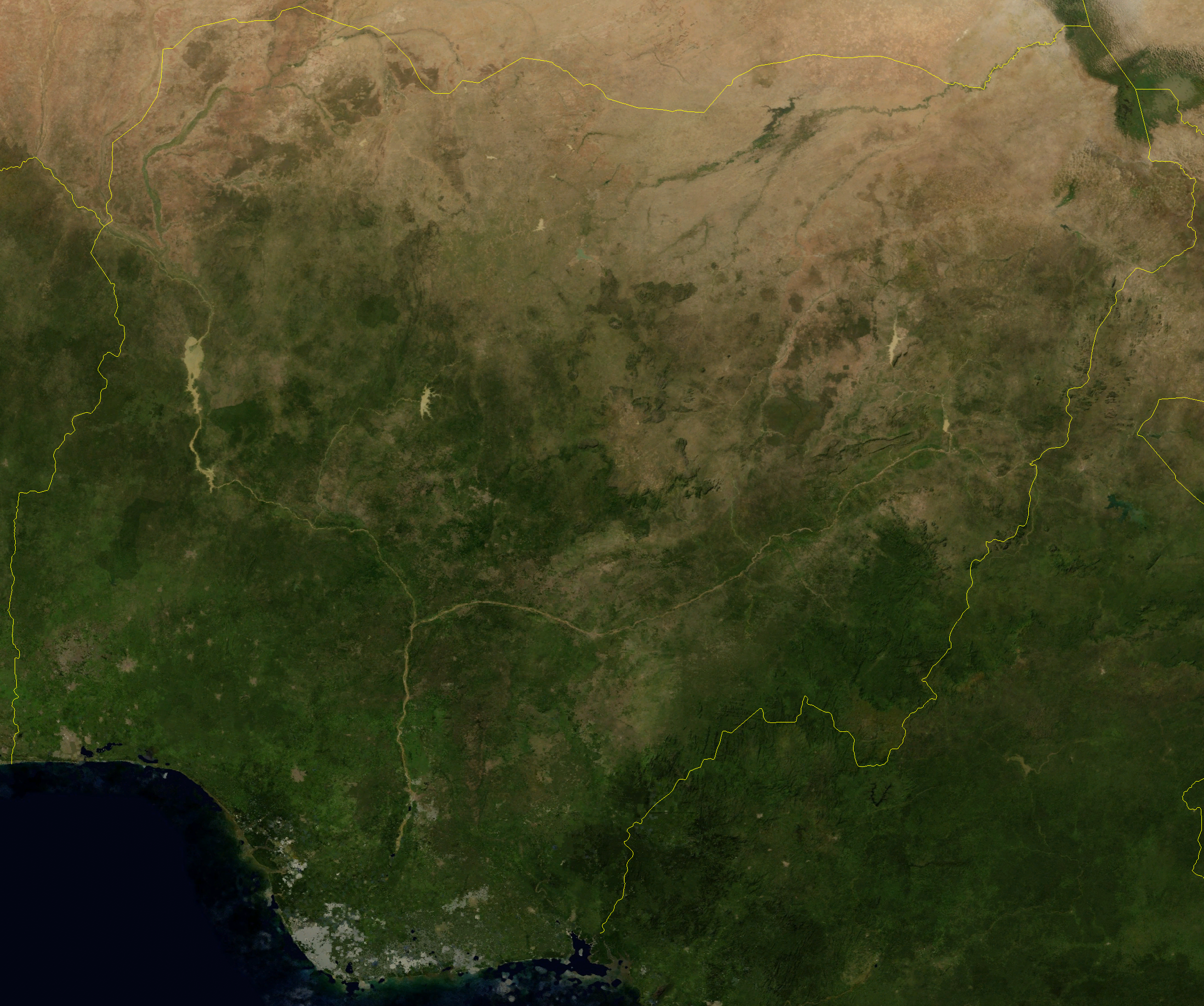
An enlargeable satellite image of Nigeria

Environment of Nigeria

- Climate of Nigeria
- Environmental issues in Nigeria
- Ecoregions in Nigeria
- Renewable energy in Nigeria
- Protected areas of Nigeria
  - National parks of Nigeria
- Wildlife of Nigeria
  - Fauna of Nigeria
    - Birds of Nigeria
    - Mammals of Nigeria

==== Natural geographic features of Nigeria ====
- Glaciers in Nigeria: none
- Islands of Nigeria
- Mountains of Nigeria
  - Volcanoes in Nigeria
- Rivers of Nigeria

Olumirin Water Falls, Erin Ijesa, Oriade Local Government Area, Osun State.

- World Heritage Sites in Nigeria

=== Regions of Nigeria ===
Regions of Nigeria

==== Ecoregions of Nigeria ====
List of ecoregions in Nigeria

- Ecoregions in Nigeria

==== Administrative divisions of Nigeria ====
===== Municipalities of Nigeria =====
- Capital of Nigeria: Abuja and former capital Lagos
- Cities of Nigeria
- Villages of Nigeria

=== Demography of Nigeria ===
Demographics of Nigeria

== Government and politics of Nigeria ==
Politics of Nigeria

- Form of government: federal presidential representative democratic republic
- Capital of Nigeria: Abuja
- Elections in Nigeria
- Political parties in Nigeria

=== Branches of the government of Nigeria ===
Government of Nigeria

==== Executive branch of the government of Nigeria ====
- Head of state and head of government: President of Nigeria, Bola Tinubu
- Cabinet of Nigeria

==== Legislative branch of the government of Nigeria ====
- Parliament of Nigeria (bicameral)
  - Upper house: Senate of Nigeria
  - Lower house: House of Representatives of Nigeria

==== Judicial branch of the government of Nigeria ====
Court system of Nigeria

- Supreme Court of Nigeria

=== Foreign relations of Nigeria ===
Foreign relations of Nigeria

- Diplomatic missions in Nigeria
- Diplomatic missions of Nigeria

==== International organization membership ====
The Federal Republic of Nigeria is a member of:

- African, Caribbean, and Pacific Group of States (ACP)
- African Development Bank Group (AfDB)
- African Union (AU)
- African Union/United Nations Hybrid operation in Darfur (UNAMID)
- Commonwealth of Nations
- Economic Community of West African States (ECOWAS)
- Food and Agriculture Organization (FAO)
- Group of 15 (G15)
- Group of 24 (G24)
- Group of 77 (G77)
- International Atomic Energy Agency (IAEA)
- International Bank for Reconstruction and Development (IBRD)
- International Chamber of Commerce (ICC)
- International Civil Aviation Organization (ICAO)
- International Criminal Court (ICCt)
- International Criminal Police Organization (Interpol)
- International Development Association (IDA)
- International Federation of Red Cross and Red Crescent Societies (IFRCS)
- International Finance Corporation (IFC)
- International Fund for Agricultural Development (IFAD)
- International Hydrographic Organization (IHO)
- International Labour Organization (ILO)
- International Maritime Organization (IMO)
- International Mobile Satellite Organization (IMSO)
- International Monetary Fund (IMF)
- International Olympic Committee (IOC)
- International Organization for Migration (IOM)
- International Organization for Standardization (ISO)
- International Red Cross and Red Crescent Movement (ICRM)
- International Telecommunication Union (ITU)
- International Telecommunications Satellite Organization (ITSO)
- International Trade Union Confederation (ITUC)
- Inter-Parliamentary Union (IPU)
- Islamic Development Bank (IDB)
- Multilateral Investment Guarantee Agency (MIGA)
- Nonaligned Movement (NAM)
- Organisation of Islamic Cooperation (OIC)
- Organisation for the Prohibition of Chemical Weapons (OPCW)
- Organization of American States (OAS) (observer)
- Organization of Petroleum Exporting Countries (OPEC)
- Permanent Court of Arbitration (PCA)
- United Nations (UN)
- United Nations Conference on Trade and Development (UNCTAD)
- United Nations Educational, Scientific, and Cultural Organization (UNESCO)
- United Nations High Commissioner for Refugees (UNHCR)
- United Nations Industrial Development Organization (UNIDO)
- United Nations Mission for the Referendum in Western Sahara (MINURSO)
- United Nations Mission in Liberia (UNMIL)
- United Nations Mission in the Central African Republic and Chad (MINURCAT)
- United Nations Mission in the Sudan (UNMIS)
- United Nations Observer Mission in Georgia (UNOMIG)
- United Nations Operation in Cote d'Ivoire (UNOCI)
- United Nations Organization Mission in the Democratic Republic of the Congo (MONUC)
- Universal Postal Union (UPU)
- World Customs Organization (WCO)
- World Federation of Trade Unions (WFTU)
- World Health Organization (WHO)
- World Intellectual Property Organization (WIPO)
- World Meteorological Organization (WMO)
- World Tourism Organization (UNWTO)
- World Trade Organization (WTO)

=== Law and order in Nigeria ===
Law of Nigeria

- Cannabis in Nigeria
- Constitution of Nigeria
- Crime in Nigeria
- Human rights in Nigeria
  - LGBT rights in Nigeria
- Law enforcement in Nigeria

=== Military of Nigeria ===
Military of Nigeria

- Command
  - Commander-in-chief:
    - Ministry of Defence of Nigeria
- Forces
  - Army of Nigeria
  - Navy of Nigeria
  - Air Force of Nigeria
- Military history of Nigeria

=== Local government in Nigeria ===
Local government in Nigeria characteristic of local government in Nigeria

== History of Nigeria ==
=== History by period ===
- Before 1500
- 1500 to 1800
- Colonial era
- First Nigerian Republic (1963 to 1966)
- Second Nigerian Republic (1979 to 1983)
- Third Nigerian Republic (1993)
- Fourth Nigerian Republic (1999 to present)

=== History of Nigeria by region ===
- History of Northern Nigeria

=== History of Nigeria by subject ===
- Economic history of Nigeria
- Military history of Nigeria

== Culture of Nigeria ==
Culture of Nigeria

- Architecture of Nigeria
- Chieftaincy of Nigeria
- Cuisine of Nigeria
- Festivals in Nigeria
- Languages of Nigeria
- Media in Nigeria
- Museums in Nigeria
- National symbols of Nigeria
  - Coat of arms of Nigeria
  - Flag of Nigeria
  - National anthem of Nigeria
- People of Nigeria
- Prostitution in Nigeria
- Public holidays in Nigeria
- Religion in Nigeria
  - Christianity in Nigeria
  - Hinduism in Nigeria
  - Islam in Nigeria
- Social class in Nigeria
- World Heritage Sites in Nigeria

=== Art in Nigeria ===
- Cinema of Nigeria
- Heraldry in Nigeria
- Literature of Nigeria
- Music of Nigeria
- Video gaming in Nigeria

=== Sports in Nigeria ===
Sports in Nigeria

- Football in Nigeria
- Nigeria at the Olympics

== Economy and infrastructure of Nigeria ==
Economy of Nigeria

- Economic rank, by nominal GDP (2007): 41st (forty-first)
- Agriculture in Nigeria
- Banking in Nigeria
- Communications in Nigeria
  - Internet in Nigeria
- Companies of Nigeria
- Currency of Nigeria: Naira
  - ISO 4217: NGN
- Economic history of Nigeria
- Energy in Nigeria
  - Oil industry in Nigeria
- Health care in Nigeria
- Mining in Nigeria
- Nigeria Stock Exchange
- Tourism in Nigeria
- Transport in Nigeria
  - Airports in Nigeria
  - Rail transport in Nigeria
- Water supply and sanitation in Nigeria

== Education in Nigeria ==
Education in Nigeria

== See also ==
- List of international rankings
- List of Nigeria-related topics
- Member state of the Commonwealth of Nations
- Member state of the United Nations
- Outline of Africa
- Outline of geography
