= Ibukun =

Ibukun is a given name. Ibukun means "Blessing" in the Yoruba language. Notable people with the name include:

- Ibukun Awosika (born 1962), Nigerian businesswoman and writer
- Ibukun Odusote, Nigerian civil servant
