= Mary Uduma =

Nigerian business executive (born 1952)

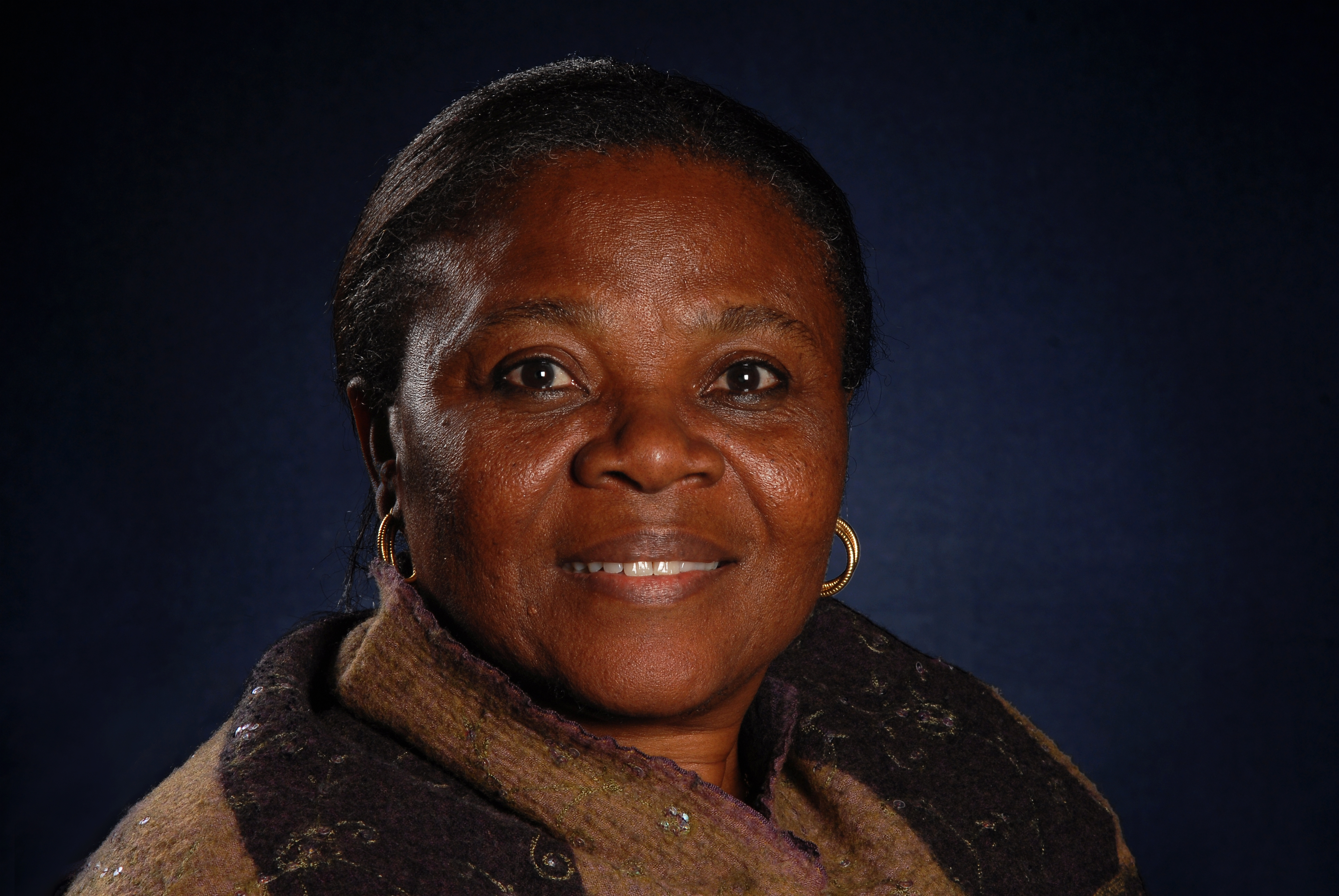
- Born: May 25, 1952 (age 74)
- Organization: Nigeria Internet Registration Association

Mary Uduma (born May 25, 1952) is a Nigerian business executive. She is a two times President of Nigeria Internet Registration Association (NIRA). She is the chairperson of Nigeria Internet Governance Forum.

== Education ==
Uduma studied accounting at Institute of Management Technology, Enugu (IMT). She later attended University of Lagos and obtained her B.Sc. in accounting.

== Career ==
Uduma worked at Federal Audit as an executive officer while she was still schooling at University of Lagos. She later worked with Ivory Merchant Bank.

In 1995, Uduma joined the Nigerian Communications Commission as the finance assistant director. In 1999 she became the deputy director in the tariff and charges department. She was moved to corporate planning in 2005 where she worked for one year before becoming the Director of Licensing. She became the head of consumer affairs in 2011.

She served as the vice president of Nigeria Internet Registration Association (NIRA) before emerging as the 2nd President of the association. She was also re-elected as the 3rd President. She is the chairperson for Nigeria Internet Governance Forum (NIGF). She represented NIGF at the 2019 International Women Day program held Abuja and spoke on the inclusion of women having a say in policies involving cyber space both locally and internationally.

== Selected awards ==
In 2016, she received special recognition with the NIRA Presidential Award, by the Nigeria Internet Registration Association (NIRA).
