= Video games in Nigeria =

The video game industry is a relatively young sector in Nigeria. As of 2015, the video game development sector is still very small in the country, with only half a dozen young companies creating games. However, in part due to the country's fast growing mobile market and its young population, video games are rapidly growing in popularity.

== Current situation ==
Due to the growing penetration of smartphones across Nigeria and mobile broadband access that is cheaper and faster than it has been a few years earlier, developers have the opportunity to spread mobile games easily. The population of Nigeria is young, with more than 60% of the population being under 25 years old, and its locally produced movies and music both form a strong industry. Nigeria has the world's fastest growing mobile internet usage behind China and India.

According to Kunle Ogungbamila, CEO of Kuluya, Africa is "mobile first," with 650 million mobile phone subscribers in Africa and close to 20% of those subscribers owning smartphones. This figure is expected to double by 2017. Android-based operating systems are currently the most used, but as the Google Play Store has millions of North American and European applications available in the country, it is difficult for local developers to break through. Furthermore, in-app purchases have proven to be an unsuccessful market strategy in Nigeria, with only 15% of the customers of local "breakout hit" ChopUp being willing to pay. However, mobile banking has only been introduced in Nigeria in 2012 and is expected to grow greatly in the coming years. Microsoft's purchase of Nokia in 2014 helped boosting the Windows platform in Nigeria, while iOS is still lagging behind.

According to Nigerian developers, the biggest market for local games is overseas. The business model of video game developer Gamsole targets foreign customers, with their games drawing inspiration from western releases such as Candy Crush and Angry Birds. According to founder Abiola Olaniran, "We don’t see it making sense for us to design for Nigerians alone ... We couldn’t have gotten ... 9 million downloads in Nigeria." More than 60% of video games released by Kuluya are being downloaded outside of Nigeria, with most downloads coming from Ghana, Kenya and South Africa, as well as various Asian countries. In 2013, Kuluya was valued at $2million after raising another seed stage investment to expand its commercial activities.

Large western companies such as Electronic Arts and Gameloft have been profiting the Nigerian game market since 2012. Meanwhile, large console manufacturers such as Microsoft and Sony have little interest in the country. And though the Xbox 360 and PlayStation 3 are reasonably popular, services as Xbox Live are not available in Nigeria and video game piracy is common.

Kuluya, Gamsole and Maliyo Games, each based in Lagos and focused on mobile gaming, were considered some of the most important game developers in Africa in 2013. The gaming culture in Nigeria is considered one of the fastest growing in Africa.

== Local theming ==
Nigerian video game developers have been attempting to create games with a "distinctly local flavor." For instance, local developer Maliyo Games builds games such as Okada Ride, "a game based on the ubiquitous delivery motorcycles that zip about the streets of Lagos." Mosquito Smasher is a game focused on killing Malaria-spreading mosquitoes and is increasing awareness of the disease. According to Hugo Obi, co-creator of Maliyo Games, the company aims to "use game[s] as an engine to share African experiences between ourselves and with the rest of the world through African narratives, sounds and characters."

Kuluya takes a similar approach, weaving its games around local myths and stories in order to portray the country's rich and varied culture. CEO Ogungbamila said that "as a Yoruba person, I can pick out five very beautiful mythical or historical stories that we could draw from and build a game around. That's just in my local culture." Ogungbamila has spoken out against the negative portrayal of Africa in western video games focusing on prejudiced colonial-era viewpoints of "people who are forever in need of help." Kuluya has also been developing games containing nods to other African countries, such as Kenya and South Africa.

== Video game developers of Nigeria ==
=== Misc ===
- Maliyo Games (Mobile games)

== Video game publishers of Nigeria ==
=== Publisher & development firms ===
- Gamsole (Mobile, online games)
- gazuntype
- Gbrossoft (Aka "Gbros Software and Games Ltd")

=== Defunct publishers ===
- Kuluya (Founded 2010. Defunct 2017. Publisher & dev: online games.)
