= Economic history of Nigeria =

The economic history of Nigeria falls into three periods. They are the: pre-colonial, the colonial and the post-colonial or independence periods. The pre-colonial period covers the longest part of Nigerian history. The colonial period covers a period of 60 years, 1900-1960 while the independence period dates from October 1, 1960.

== Colonialism ==
Colonialism is a period or time where one country takes over the political control of another country with the intention of profiting economically from the resources of the weaker country and having dominion over the colonised nation. Colonialism can also be defined as a practice where one country dominates another country through subjugation of the weaker people over the stronger people.

Colonialism is a major feature of the economic history of Nigeria. Britain eventually gained control of the Nigerian administrators covering the period . After independence, the Nigerian economy seemed very promising. Many saw Nigeria, with 15% of Africa's population, as an emerging economy. However, this potential never materialized. A series of unfortunate political and economic events have stalled Nigerian growth. The country still plays an important economic role in the world, especially as a producer of fossil fuels.

== Nigeria during the Atlantic slave trade ==
In the Fifteenth century, Europe started direct trade. The Portuguese had explored the coasts to avoid Saharan intermediaries in the trade of West African gold to Europe and that was a way to India. The Portuguese built coastal bases and introduced the Atlantic slave trade when they bought captives from the kingdom of Benin (nowadays Nigeria) and sold them to African tradesmen on the coast (nowadays Ghana).

The period from 1680 to 1800 was dominated by a boom of the Atlantic slave trade because of the growth of the Atlantic plantation system. The effects on peaceful production and trade were terrible since slave trade was a cause of conflicts. However, the Atlantic trade still brought advantages. Especially, the currencies that West African tradesmen adopted were more efficient than earlier commodity currencies. This helped to reduce the cost of doing business.

== History of tax in Nigeria ==
In the mid-17th century to the mid-18th century, the European was on the quest to establish more trade posts for a wider competition in trade and empire in the Atlantic.

The British, like other newcomers to the slave trade, found they could compete with the Dutch in West Africa only by forming national trading companies. The first such effective English enterprise was the Company of the Royal Adventurers, chartered in 1660 and succeeded in 1672 by the Royal African Company. Only a monopoly company could afford to build and maintain the forts considered essential to hold stocks of slaves and trade goods. In the early 18th century, Britain and France made inroads on the Dutch hold on West African trade; and by the end of the French Revolution and the subsequent Napoleonic Wars (1799–1815), Britain had become the dominant commercial power in West Africa.

The slave trade was one of the major causes of the devastating internecine strife in southern Nigeria during the three centuries to the mid-19th century, when abolition occurred. In the 19th century, Britain was interested primarily in opening markets for its manufactured goods in West Africa and expanding commerce in palm oil. Securing the oil and ivory trade required that Britain usurp the power of coastal chiefs in what became Nigeria.

That was an unplanned consequence of the creation of the Sokoto Caliphate in 1804. At its peak, the Sokoto Caliphate was the most populous state in Africa. Sokoto Caliphate remained a defining and reference point in West African history and Nigeria. The Caliphate occupied most of north-central and north-west Nigeria, as well as parts of neighboring countries of nowadays Nigeria. Internal peace and market integration was a basis of the commercial prosperity of the Caliphate. Hausa merchant diasporas ran an extensive export-trade network and the state had regular increase of the labor supply through the importation of “pagan” captives as slaves. Many cities became bigger, especially, its commercial capital Kano, which was the biggest manufacturing center in the region. The clothing was exported from Kano to all over West Africa. The formation of the Sokoto Caliphate made Islam a mass rural religion for the first time in the region. The Caliphate introduced Islamic taxes that facilitated economic expansion.

Formal "protection" and—eventually—colonization of Nigeria resulted not only from the desire to safeguard Britain's expanding trade interests in the Nigerian hinterland, but also from an interest in forestalling formal claims by other colonial powers, such as France and Germany. By 1850, British trading interests were concentrating in Lagos and the Niger River delta. British administration in Nigeria formally began in 1861, when Lagos became a crown colony, a step taken in response to factors such as the now-illegal activities of slave traders, the disruption of trade by the Yoruba civil wars, and fears that the French would take over Lagos. Through a series of steps designed to facilitate trade, by 1906 present-day Nigeria was under British control.

== Northern Nigeria, 1900-1945 ==
The area that is now modern-day northern Nigeria was once dominated during prehistoric times by the Nok civilization. When the British arrived in what became Northern Nigeria, there were by then lets say for arguments sake two nations ruling the North predominantly the Fulani and then also the Indigenous Hausa, the latter of which the Hausa kingdoms were constantly being attacked by the Fulani who are conquerors by nature. The British, to keep a balance, assisted the Hausa and with their help confronted the Fulani. When the 19th century opened, the Fulani appeared to be the predominant race in the Sudan. Fulani is the Hausa name for the people who call themselves Fulbe. From 1900 to 1946, the regional British government in Northern Nigeria made exportation a high priority and set up a system of regulation to control diseases and maintain quality. In terms of exports, one of the main agricultural industries involved the production and export of hides and skins. It had been developed long before the British arrived, for the pre-colonial caravan trade and have reached an international market. World demand soared during the two world wars. The regional government imposed new, more efficient procedures in flaying, trimming, and drying hides and skins. It imposed new rules regarding minimum standards, and compulsory inspection, which had the effect of raising quality and obtaining higher prices. European merchants and industrialists had unlimited access to, and sometimes prevailed on, the colonial state, but the latter exercised autonomous decision-making power on matters affecting the economy and commerce of the colony.

== National Economic Interests in the Postwar Period ==
Starting in 1949, when Nigeria's elites were first consulted by the British as part of a constitutional review on emergent labor and commercial industry and in the ongoing debate over the pressure of decolonization, independence, and modernization. The two coup d'états of 1966 and the civil war of 1967-70 reflected economic as well as political elements.

Between 1951 and 1960, the major political parties played leading roles in unifying and locally mobilizing the economic elite. Elites from majority parties in the regional assemblies who cooperated with the ruling federal coalition dispensed a wide range of rewards and sanctions, thus retaining their own positions and power and kept the masses subordinated. Positions in government services and public corporations, licenses for market stalls, permits for agricultural export production, rights to establish enterprises, roads, electrical service, running water, and the governing group allocated scholarships to its supporters. Each major party was backed by a bank, which assisted in the transfer of substantial public funds to the party.

At all levels—local and regional after 1951 and federal after 1954—political leaders could use a range of controls, extending over local councils, district administration, police, and courts, to subdue any dissident minority, especially in the far north, where clientage was the social adhesive of the emirate system. Political superiors offered protection, patronage, and economic security in exchange for loyalty and the obedience of inferiors.

The elites attracted clients and socially inferior groups not only in the far north, where Islam legitimized the traditional hierarchy, but even in Igboland, an area of southeastern Nigeria where power had been widely dispersed before the 20th century. The elites of the three regions preferred to close ranks to share the fruits of office and to prevent challenges to their positions, but by the time independence was achieved in 1960, policies designed to enhance the security of one regional elite threatened the security of others.

== Nigerian Political and Economic change between 1980s - 2020 ==
Unlike the 1970s, a major feature of Nigeria's economy in the 1980s was its dependence on petroleum, which accounts for 87 percent of export receipts and 77 percent of the Federal government's current revenue in 1988. Falling oil output and prices contributed to another noteworthy aspect of the economy in the 1980s—the decline in per capita real gross national product, which persisted until oil prices began to rise in 1990. Indeed, GNP per capital per year decreased 4.8 percent from 1980 to 1987, which led in 1989 to Nigeria's classification by the World Bank as a low-income country (based on 1987 data) for the first time since the annual World Development Report was instituted in 1978. In 1989 the World Bank also declared Nigeria poor enough to be eligible (along with countries such as Bangladesh, Ethiopia, Chad, and Mali) for concessional aid from an affiliate, the International Development Association (IDA).

Another relevant feature of the Nigerian economy was an abrupt change in the government's share of expenditures. As a percentage of gross domestic product, national government expenditures rose from 9 percent in 1962 to 44 percent in 1979 but fell to 17 percent in 1988. In the aftermath of the 1967-70 civil war, Nigeria's government became more centralized. The oil boom of the 1970s" provided the tax revenue to strengthen the central government further. Expansion of the government's share of the economy did little to enhance its political and administrative capacity but did increase incomes and the number of jobs that the governing elites could distribute to their clients.

The economic collapse in the late 1970s and early 1980s contributed to substantial discontent and conflict between ethnic communities and nationalities, adding to the political pressure to expel more than 2 million illegal workers (mostly from Ghana, Niger, Cameroon, and Chad) in early 1983 and May 1985.

Between 2009 and 2019, poverty in Nigeria declined by between 3–7 percentage points.

== Boko Haram's effect on Nigeria's economy ==
Nigeria has one of the largest populations in Africa with over 200 million citizens. Its economy booms from the oil industry in the Niger Delta, and is said to be the leading economy in Africa in 2020. Although Nigeria's economy is doing well, research has proven 35 percent of the population live in absolute poverty. Approximately, 90 million Nigerians are believed to live on less than one US dollar a day. With economic insecurity, high unemployment rates, and poverty, the Boko Haram group was able to emerge within Nigeria as political protests. Boko Haram is a violent social group that arose, partly in response to the social and economic deprivation of Nigeria's northeastern population. Starting out around 2008, Boko Haram has carried out attacks in order to spread their Islamic influence and defeat the westernization that began during colonialism.

They were able to recruit among the youths population of Nigeria because of unemployment; approximately 64 million youths are unemployed with 1.6 million being underemployed. Boko Haram targets individuals or organizations who encourage lifestyles believed to follow western culture, like the US or Europe. One targeted attack was on women who were attacked while attending school, leading to roughly 250 girls being kidnapped.

The Boko Haram is believed to be responsible for roughly 10,000 deaths and 2.6 million displaced Nigerians since 2011. Nigeria's economy suffered when attacks held by the Boko Haram began on local businesses, government buildings, and local facilities such as schools and churches. Local businesses began to migrate to Southern region of Nigeria as a result of being attacked or due to fear of the Boko Haram. Roughly 80 percent of the businesses in Kano had to close down due to power failure and security challenges caused by attacks. In the capital city of Borno, Maiduguri, a major market known as Market Monday was drastically hit by the Boko Haram causing over 10,000 shops to shut down . Banks were said to be affected by the Boko Haram's violent attacks, and caused them to shorten their hours from eight to three hours to minimize the risk of getting hit by the Boko Haram; limiting citizens to their finances. Citizens and the government had to pay for the retribution of damages caused by the Boko Haram. This stalled the economy in the northeast region because businesses were leaving, people began to lose jobs, and there was less money going into the local economy. Conflict impacts child health through multiple pathways. Foreign investors began to withdraw their money from Nigeria because of the state of conflict Nigeria is in and the degrading economy as a result of the Boko Haram; causing Nigeria to lose 1.33 trillion dollars in foreign investments. Nigerian refugees who were displaced or just seeking refuge from the Boko Haram migrated to neighboring countries such as Cameroon, Ghana, Niger, and Chad. Majority citizens migrated to the southern half of Nigeria where there are more opportunities for work, better economy, and more security. This further plays into the socioeconomic divide between the north and the south of Nigeria where the south is more financially stable from lack of conflict, government funding, and the oil industry in the Niger Delta.
