= Ibukun Odusote =

Nigerian civil servant

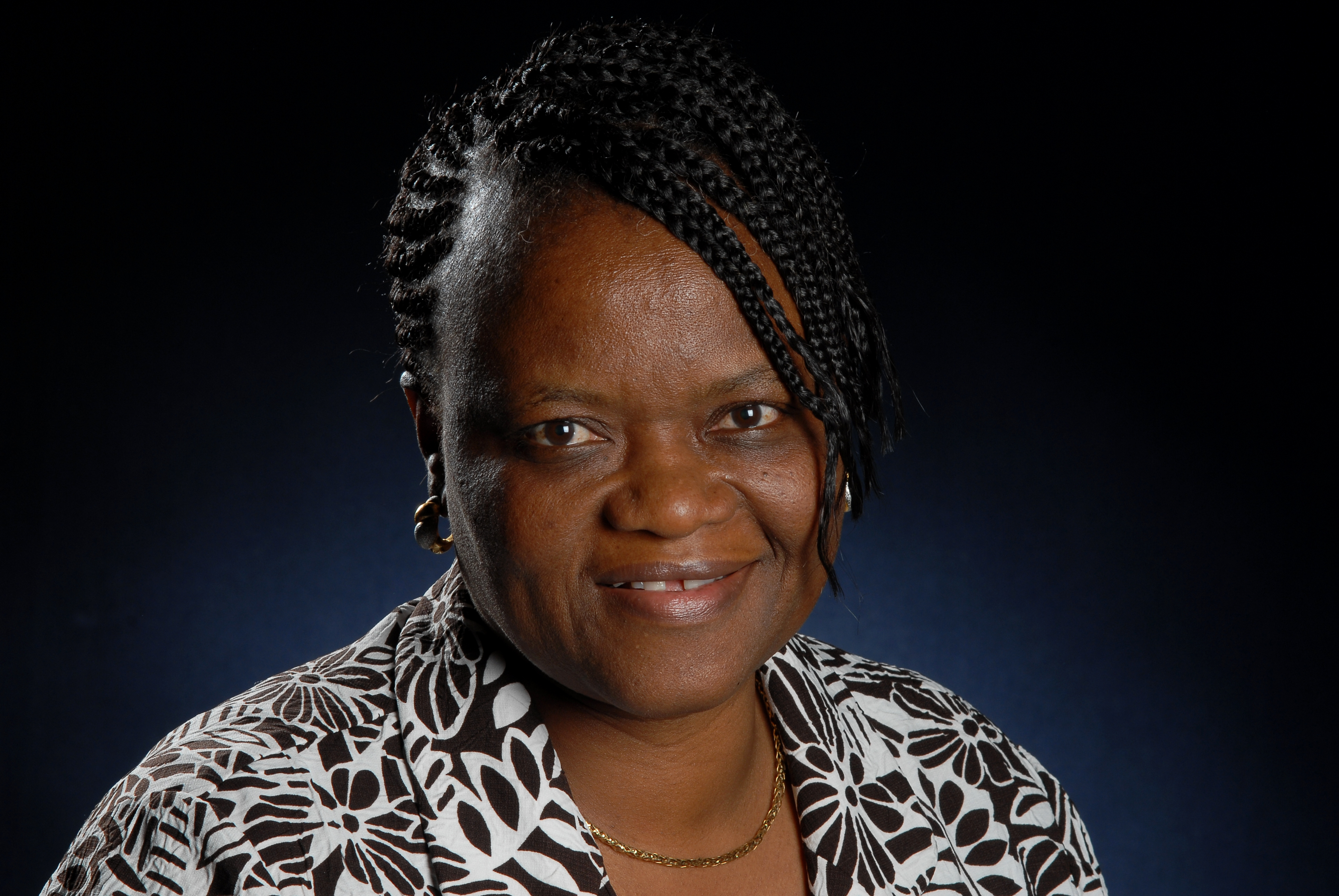
- Born: Iyabo Abimbola
- Employer: Federal Government of Nigeria
- Spouse: Adeolu Odusote
- Children: 1

Ibukun Odusote is a Nigerian civil servant in IT and administration. She was the first administrative contact person for the .ng top level Nigerian domain name. She has served as the Permanent Secretary for the Nigerian Federal Ministry of Agriculture and Rural Development and for the Political Affairs Department in the Office of the Secretary to the Federal Government.

== Early life and education ==
Odusote was born in Ikenne-Remo in Ogun State in Nigeria. She was educated at St. Teresa's College, Oke-Ado Ibadan in Oyo State. After obtaining her school certificate, she attended Obafemi Awolowo University. She graduated in computer science and economics.

Later at Lagos University, she earned an MBA and an MSc. From 1995 to 1998, she was the director of the Centre for Information Technology and Management at Yaba College of Technology.

== Career ==
Odusote became known as a senior civil servant in information technology. She was the first contact person for the .ng domain name. In 2013, Odusote was made a life patron of the Nigeria Internet Registration Association for her pioneering work. She was the former ICT head for Yaba College of Technology before moving to work for the Nigerian Ministry of Information as Director of Information Technology. She has served as a Permanent Secretary in various ministries including the Ecological Funds Office, Federal Ministry of Power, Federal Ministry of Environment and Federal Ministry of Culture, Tourism & National Orientation.

Odusote was appointed to be the permanent secretary to Akinwumi Adesina at the Federal Ministry of Agriculture and Rural Development. Whilst she was there, the minister won prizes for the revolution he was making in Nigerian Agriculture.

In 2000, Odusote became the national coordinator for Digitest, an annual camp and competition to encourage students to develop internet-based solutions that address items of national interest.

== Personal life ==
She is married to the Reverend Adeolu Odusote and they have a daughter. The couple are both senior figures in the Foursquare Church in Abuja.
