= .ng =

Internet country code top-level domain for Nigeria

- Introduced: 15 March 1995
- TLD type: Country code top-level domain
- Status: Active
- Registry: Nigeria Internet Registration Association
- Sponsor: National Information Technology Development Agency
- Intended use: Entities connected with Nigeria
- Actual use: Very popular in Nigeria
- Registered domains: 157,072 (May 2020)
- Registration restrictions: Open domains can be registered by anybody with intent to use; semi-closed and closed domains have specific industry-based restrictions.
- Structure: Registrations can be made both at the second and third levels; NIRA may register premium domains at the second level
- Documents: NIRA Policies
- Dispute policies: NIRA Dispute Resolution Policy
- Registry website: NIRA (Nigeria Internet Registration Association)

.ng is the Internet country code top-level domain (ccTLD) for Nigeria. It is overseen by the Nigeria Internet Registration Association (NIRA).

== History ==
The top-level domain was first delegated in 1995 to Ibukun Odusote at the Yaba College of Technology. She was made a life patron of the Nigeria Internet Registration Association in 2013 for her work.

Operations were initially handled by an organisation in Italy, the Instituto per le Applicazioni Telematiche (today known as the Istituto di Informatica e Telematica), but were later transferred to Randy Bush. In 2004, .ng was re-delegated to a Nigerian organisation, the National Information Technology Development Agency, and then in 2009, to the Nigeria Internet Registration Association.

== Second level domains ==
- com.ng – open domain, commercial entities and businesses
- org.ng – semi-open domain, non-commercial organisations
- gov.ng – closed domain, governmental organisations
- edu.ng – closed domain, degree awarding institutions
- net.ng – closed domain, ISP infrastructure
- sch.ng – closed domain, secondary schools
- name.ng – open domain, individuals
- mobi.ng – open domain, suitable for mobile devices
- mil.ng – closed domain (Nigerian military establishments only)
- i.ng – open domain, any purpose

In addition, NIRA themselves reserve the right to register 'premium' top level domains under .ng (for example, "google.ng").

== Statistics ==
As of March 2022, there are 75 registrars accredited by NIRA. Almost 70% of all .ng domains are registered under .com.ng. 7% are registered under .org.ng, which is chiefly used by local non-profit organisations. Although registration at the second level (directly under .ng) is available, only 17% of active .ng domains are registered there. Third-level domains (such as those under .com.ng) are several times cheaper than second-level names, which the registry considers more valuable for their potentially shorter length.

Figures collected in August 2026 showed further growth in adoption, with 255,001 domain names registered in the .ng zone and 168 registrars accredited by NIRA.

== Adoption ==
In 2025, Nigerian media reported a coordinated push by public institutions and stakeholders to increase adoption of the .ng domain.

== See also ==
- Internet in Nigeria
- ISO 3166-2:NG
- .africa the officially designated top-level domain (TLD) for the African and Pan African domains
- List of Internet top-level domains
