= Geeky Nigeria =

Nigerian news website

- Let's make society better
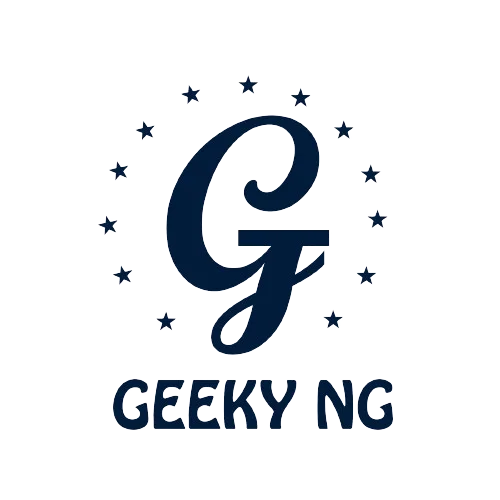
- Type: Online newspaper
- Publisher: John Victor
- Editor-in-chief: Oluwapelumi Olorundare
- Staff writers: Ada Josiah; Michael Ingbian; Faith Akintola
- Founded: 2019; 7 years ago
- Language: English
- Headquarters: Lagos, Nigeria
- Website: geeky.com.ng

Geeky Nigeria is a Nigerian website covering News on Technology, Education and Development. The website was launched in 2019. The online medium is notable for original contents on Technology, Education and Lifestyle. It also features interviews with Best Graduating Students across Nigerian Universities.

Geeky NG was established in 2019 with the goal of providing Nigerians with reliable and up-to-date information on technology, education, and lifestyle. Since its inception, the website has grown in popularity, attracting a large following of tech-savvy individuals, students, and professionals.

== Plugin development ==
In July 2020, Geeky Nigeria developed an innovative Wordpress Plugin, WP Tic-Tac-Toe to help drive user engagement on Wordpress-powered websites.

== Awards and recognition ==
- Won ".NG Best Online Media Website 2024" by the Nigeria Internet Registration Association.
- Nominated for ".NG Company Of The Year 2024" by the Nigeria Internet Registration Association.
- Recognized by MEA Markets as "Best Technology Focused Media Platform 2024 - Nigeria".
- Nominated for "Best Online Media Website 2023" alongside BusinessDay (Nigeria) and TheCable by Nigeria Internet Registration Association
- Recognized by MEA Markets as "Best Lifestyle & Technology Blog 2023 - Nigeria".
