= History of Northern Nigeria =

The history of Northern Nigeria covers the history of the region from pre-historic times to the modern period of Northern Nigerian state.

== Pre-History ==
The Nok culture, an ancient culture dominated most of what is now Northern Nigeria in pre historic times, its legacy in the form of terracotta statues and megaliths have been discovered in Sokoto, Kano, Birinin Kudu, Nok and Zaria. The Kwatarkwashi culture, a variant of the Nok culture centred mostly around Zamfara in Sokoto Province is thought by some to be the same or an offshoot of the Nok.

== The Kanem-Bornu Empire ==
The history of Borno is closely linked to that of Kanem, which grew into an empire in the Lake Chad basin in the 13th century. At times, it extended as far as Fezzan in southern Libya. The Mai (king) of Kanem and his court adopted Islam in the 11th century, just as the western empires had done. Islam was used to strengthen the political and social structures of the state, although many established customs were retained. Thus women continued to exert considerable political influence, especially the Magira (Queen Mother) and the Magara (the official “elder sister” of Mai).

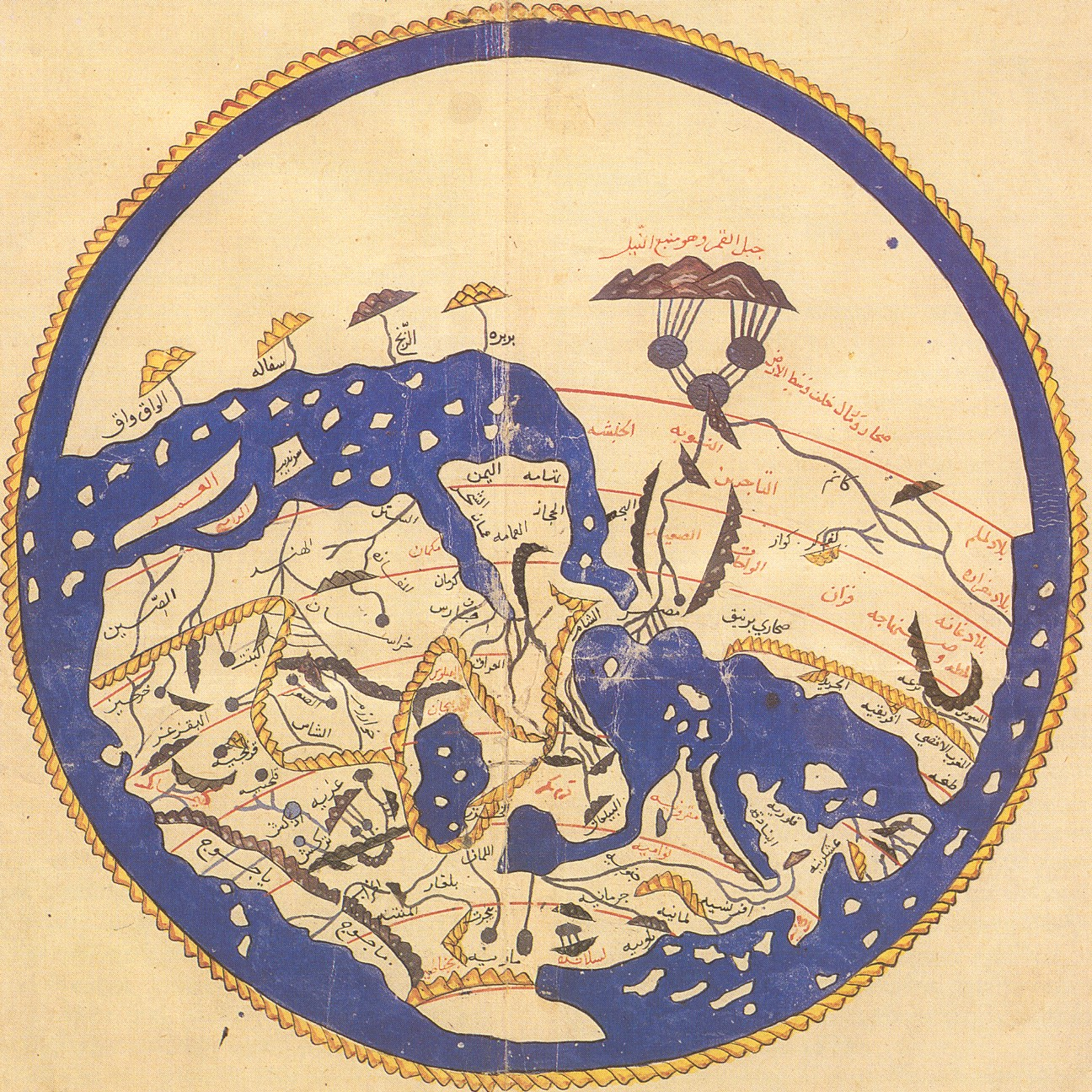
Alî ibn Hasan al-Hûfî al-Qâsimî's 1456 copy of the world map made by al-Idrisi, the 12th-century geographer.

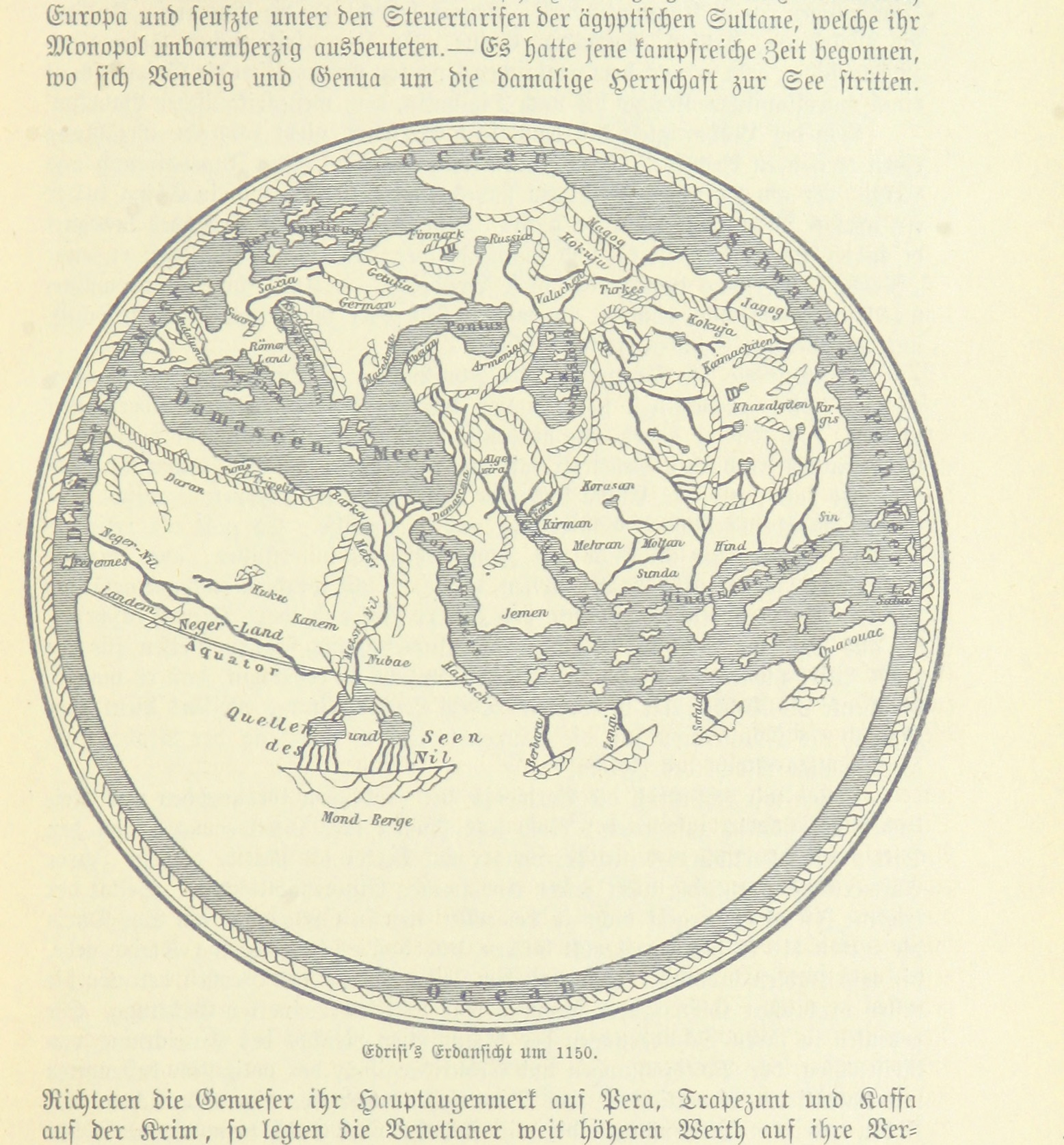
Reproduction of the al-Qâsimî's copy by Otto Spamer.

Kanem can be seen on the northeastern part of the al-Qâsimî's copy and the southwestern part of Spamer's version.

The first ruler of Kanem was Saif, who founded his dynasty, the Sayfawa, which ruled the empire for a millennium (800 AD to 1846 AD). The first Muslim ruler of Kanem was Mai Umme Jilmi (r. 1085-1097), who died on his way to Mecca in Egypt. His son and successor Dunama I (r. 1097-1150) is said to have made two pilgrimages to Mecca and was drowned by Egyptians near Suez on his third pilgrimage. In the late 12th century, Kanem maintained diplomatic relations with Tunisia. At this time, Kanem also maintained a madrasa (hostel) in Cairo, which was intended for students and pilgrims from his territory. Due to Kanem's growing influence in North Africa and the territorial expansion it achieved in the 12th and 13th centuries, the empire became very well known in the Islamic world of the time.

The Mai/King deployed his bodyguards and an army of nobles to extend his authority from Kanem to Borno. The civil war that disrupted Kanem in the second half of the 14th century led to the independence of Bornu. The Sayfawa, who fled to Bornu, were severely weakened by the dynastic struggles in the late 14th and early 15th centuries. Mai Ali Ghaji (r. 1470-1508) established a large capital called Birnin N'gazargamu, which was the center of Bornu. Ali Ghaji carried out government reforms and put an end to civil unrest. With a reinvigorated army, he extended Bornu's influence to neighboring regions and even demanded tribute from some Hausa states. He also re-established diplomatic relations with North Africa. Ali's successors kept Kanem as a province of Bornu until the 19th century.

The most wealthy period in the history of the empire was the reign of Idris Alauma (1571–1603). Its documentation is due to the Imam Ahmed ibn Fartua, who recorded the first twelve years of Alauma's reign. Alauma ascended the throne after an interregnum during which Bornu was ruled by his mother Aicha. Shortly after his accession to the throne, he procured Turkish musketeers from North Africa as well as horses, camels and various weapons for his troops in order to strengthen Bornu's military power. He led numerous campaigns to pacify Bornu's neighbors and conquer territories. His troops carried out far-reaching campaigns: in the north from Fezzan in southern Libya to Kawar in northern Niger; in the east from the Kanem region in eastern Chad to the Mandara region in northern Cameroon; in the south he crushed the rebellion of a Marghi prince; and in the west he subdued Kano and demanded tribute from the Hausa states. In addition to waging war, Alauma also carried out administrative reforms. He began to replace customary law with Shari'a (Islamic Law) in certain matters and appointed qadis (judges) to rule on legal matters independently of the traditional rulers. He encouraged the construction of several mosques, which were built from baked bricks instead of reeds. He also undertook the pilgrimage to Mecca and financed the construction of a hostel for the Bornu pilgrims there.

The economy of Borno was dominated by the Trans-Sudanese slave trade and the desert trade in salt and livestock. The need to protect its trading interests forced Borno to intervene in Kanem from the 15th to 16th centuries. Despite its relative political weakness during this period, the court and mosques of Borno gained a reputation as centers of Islamic culture and scholarship under the patronage of a series of skillful kings.

== The Fourteen Kingdoms ==
In the 9th century a set kingdoms emerged in Northern Nigeria to replace the Kabara Nation, these Kingdoms share a similar ethno-historical dynamic cemented in their belief in a common origin. The lore of the Fourteen Kingdoms unify the diverse heritage of Northern Nigeria into a cohesive system. Seven of these Kingdoms developed from the Kabara legacy of the Hausa people. As vibrant trading centers competing with Kanem–Bornu and Mali slowly developed in the Central Sudan, a set Kingdoms merged dominating the great savannah plains of Hausaland, their primary exports were leather, gold, cloth, salt, kola nuts, animal hides, and henna. The Seven Hausa states included:

- Daura
- Kano 998–1807
- Katsina c. 1400–1805
- Zazzau (Zaria) c. 1200–1808
- Gobir ?–1808
- Rano
- Biram c. 1100–1805

The growth and conquest of the Hausa Bakwai resulted in the founding of additional states with rulers tracing their lineage to a concubine of the Hausa founding father, Bayajidda. Thus they are called the 'Banza Bakwai meaning Bastard Seven. The Banza Bakwai adopted many of the customs and institutions of the Hausa Bakwai but were considered unsanctioned or copy-cat kingdoms by non-Hausa people. These states include:

- Zamfara
- Kebbi
- Yauri (also called Yawuri)
- Gwari (also called Gwariland)
- Kwararafa (a Jukun state)
- Nupe (of the Nupe people)
- Ilorin (A yoruba State also known as Kwara)

== Hausa States ==
Between 500 CE and 700 CE, the Hausa people, who are thought to have slowly moved from Nubia and mixing in with the local Northern and Middle Belt population, established a number of strong states in what is now Northern Nigeria and Eastern Niger. With the decline of the Nok and Sokoto, who had previously controlled Central and Northern Nigeria between 800 BCE and 200 CE, the Hausa were able to emerge as the new power in the region. They are closely linked with the Kanuri people of Kanem–Bornu, Lake Chad, the Bassa people, Birom, Gwari, Nupe and Jukun. The Hausa aristocracy, under influence from the Ghana Empire adopted Islam in the 11th century CE. By the 12th century CE, the Hausa were becoming one of Africa's major powers. The architecture of the Hausa is perhaps one of the least known but most beautiful of the medieval age. Many of their early mosques and palaces are bright and colourful and often include intricate engraving or elaborate symbols designed into the facade. By 1500 CE, the Hausa utilized a modified Arabic script known as Ajami to record their own language; the Hausa compiled several written histories, the most popular being the Kano Chronicle.

== Sokoto Period ==
In the 19th century, the Fula people led a series of jihads across sudanic Africa. In Northern Nigeria and the central Sudan, Usman dan Fodio led the Fula in a bid to overthrow the Hausa Sultanates. By 1803, a new state known as the Sokoto Caliphate had replaced most of the former sultanates that had held sway over the region. The Sokoto Caliphate was under the overall authority of the Commander of the Faithful. Under Dan Fodio, the Empire was bicephalous and divided into two territories each controlled by an appointed vizier. Each of the territories was further divided into autonomous Emirates under mainly hereditary local Emirs. The Bornu Empire was initially absorbed into the Sokoto Caliphate of Usman dan Fodio, but broke away after a few years later.

== Colonial Period ==
The Initial contact of Northern Nigeria with the British was predominantly trade-related, and revolved around the expansion of the Royal Niger Company, whose interior territories spread north from about where the Niger River and Benue River joined at Lokoja, a place called (Mount Patti Hill). The Royal Niger Company's territory did not represent a direct threat to much the Sokoto Caliphate or the numerous states of Northern Nigeria. This changed, when Fredrick Lugard and Taubman Goldie laid down an ambitious plan to pacify the Niger interior and unite it with the rest of the British Empire in 1897 Lugard proclaimed a protectorate over Northern Nigeria and hostilities though sporadic soon followed; the Calipharte itself never responded to Lugards onslaught, this allowed him pacify the Emirates one by one. In February 1903, the fort of Kano fell and its slave market closed, sokoto and other regions soon followed. By the early 1920s the last pockets of resistance located in the Kanem had been pacified.

== Protectorate Period ==
The protectorate of Northern Nigeria was proclaimed at Ida by Fredrick Lugard on January 1, 1897. The basis of the colony was the 1885 Treaty of Berlin which broadly granted Northern Nigeria to Britain, on the basis of their protectorates in Southern Nigeria. Hostilities with the powerful Sokoto Caliphate soon followed. The Emirates of Kabba, Kontagora and Ilorin were the first to be conquered by the British. In February 1903, the great fort of Kano, seat of the Kano Emirate was captured, Sokoto and much of the rest of its Caliphate soon capitulated. On March 13, 1903, the Grand Shura of Caliphate finally conceded to Lugard's demands and proclaimed Queen Victoria, Queen and sovereign of the Caliphate and all its lands.

The Governor, Frederick Lugard, with limited resources, ruled with the consent of local rulers through a policy of indirect rule which he developed into a sophisticated political theory. Lugard left the protectorate after some years, serving in Hong Kong, but was eventually returned to work in Nigeria where he decided on the merger of the Northern Nigeria Protectorate with Southern Nigeria in 1914. Agitation for independence from the radically different Southern Protectorate however led to a formidable split in the 1940s. The Richards constitution, proclaimed in 1945 gave overwhelming autonomy to the North, including eventually in the areas of foreign relations and customs policy.

== 40-year interregnum ==
From 1914 to 1953, the much larger Northern Nigeria was amalgamated with the Nigerian South in the Colony and Protectorate of Nigeria, and its administration was virtually controlled from the South. During this period, local government was administered by a string of Lieutenant Governors and Chief Commissioners. In the 1940s agitation for Northernisation led to the Richards and eventually to the Macpherson constitution of 1953, which granted exceptional self-governing powers (including in the areas of foreign policy, customs and border control) to the North.

== Independence ==
Northern Nigeria was granted independence on March 15, 1953, with Sir Ahmadu Bello as its first premier. the Northern Peoples Congress under Sir Ahmadu Bello dominated parliament while the Northern Elements Progressive Union became the main opposition party.
