= Economy of the Sokoto Caliphate =

The Economy of the Sokoto Caliphate consisted of large scale plantations and industries such as textile production. Slaves were used for labour on plantations with supervision provided by an overseer. Most plantations were based around the metropolitan parts of the Caliphate and these plantations were either owned by the state, aristocracy or wealthy commoners. Some of the crops produced were cotton and indigo. Textile production was dominant in areas like the Kano Emirate.

Textile producing areas had farms to provide raw materials like cotton. Indigenous spinning and cloth-dyeing processes also existed. Restrictions were placed on women in most parts of the Caliphate, thereby limiting them to spinning. By the 19th century, the Kano region was a major exporter of textile products. Multiple currencies were available in the Caliphate. Credit systems and broker services also existed.

== Plantations ==
Plantations were a vital feature of Sokoto's economy. Among the main crops grown on plantations were cotton, indigo, grain, tobacco, onions and wheat. Slaves were primarily the labour force on these plantations while their overseer or masters took charge in the distribution of crops. Plantations emerged a result of Muhammed Bello's ribat construction in the state, where agricultural estates were built to serve these defensive structures across Sokoto.

The Jihad of Usman dan Fodio in the early 19th century, led to the capture and resettling of slaves who were used on plantations and this played a role in the growth of the agricultural sector. Plantations developed the most in the metropolitan parts of the Caliphate such as Kano and Katsina which were centres for industries and trade. The textile industries of Kano and Zaria depended on the plantations; for instance, both areas got their supplies of indigo and cotton from estates.

Plantations were owned either by the state, the aristocracy or wealthy non-aristocratic individuals. State-owned farms could be massive as the estates belonging to the Emir of Kano ranged between 350 and 1,053 acres. Most state-owned farms were used to feed royal officials and their families, clients, religious priests and horses while the surplus was sold. The aristocracy owned over fifty estates by the end of the 19th century of which hundreds or thousands of slaves worked upon. Wealthy non-aristocrats acquired land through purchase or inheritance. Caliphate officials also granted land to wealthy commoners and immigrants with tax exemption.

== Textile Industry ==
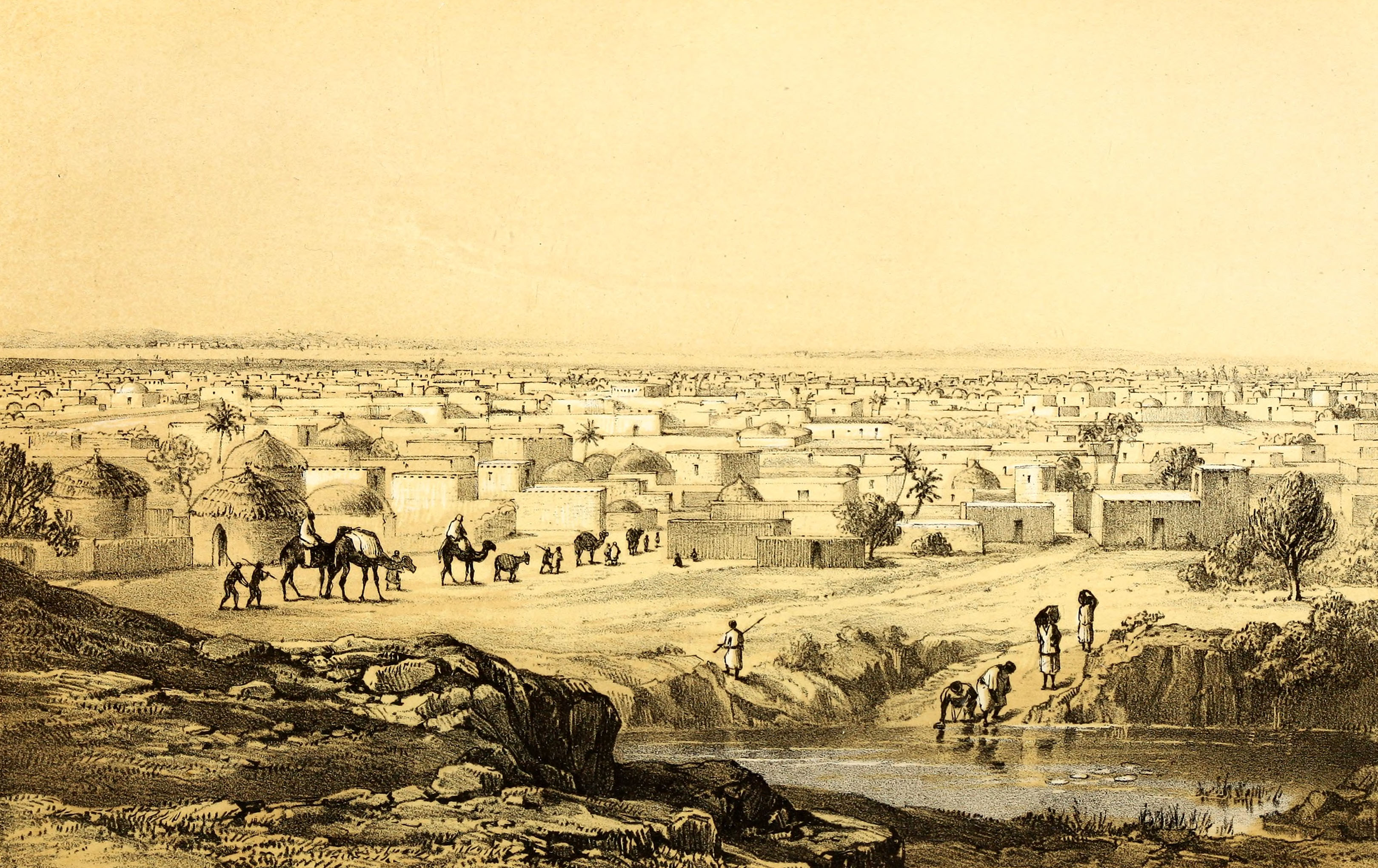
Kano was a hub for textile manufacture in 19th century Sokoto.

According to Shea Philip (2006) the textile industry was a major sector in Sokoto second only to agriculture. Kano was the region in the Caliphate where textile production was most intensive. The vertical loom became widespread across the Caliphate and this coincided with the expansion of the textile industry. Male weavers used narrow strip looms with pulley and foot pedals as well as a stone weight tensioning system which made weaving efficient. Female looms on the other hand were much simpler and hand operated but they required greater skill.

Spinners used a small light spindle for yarns. Boys and girls received training that could last for five or six years through apprenticeship and quoranic schools. Restrictions were placed on girls to learn mainly spinning. It was in the south-west areas of the Caliphate where girls had access to weaving and dye training.

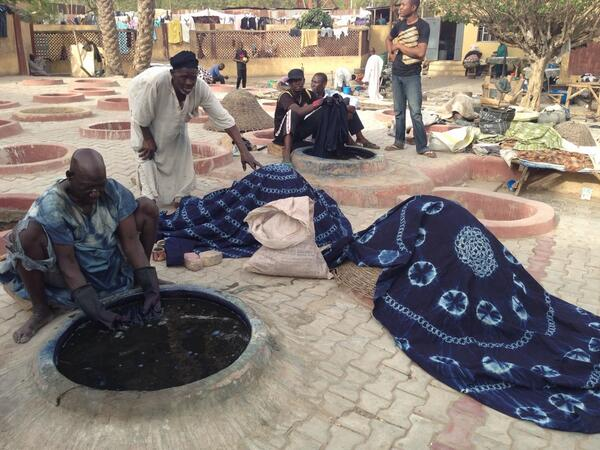
Cloth dyeing in Kano

Cloth-dyeing was prominent in Kano even before the formation of the Caliphate. Clay pots called kwatanniya were burred in beds of dyebath residue. Later, a type of cement called Laso was used to line the buried pots. Although these pots haven't been dated, Shea (2006) says they likely existed before the Sokoto jihad. The cement technology brought an innovation in the indo-dye process of the Kano region. To complete the woven textile, the cloth had to be beaten with wooden mallets on a wooden log. Special large mallets were used to beat shuni (indigo) paste into dyed clothes. Following the advice of Caliph Aliyu Baba, Emir Ibrahim Dabo and his successor did not impose taxes on Kano's craftsmen. Also, the taxes on the dye-pits were light.

In 1851, Heinrich Barth estimated Kano to have exported 10 million sandals as well as shoes for the North African market, leather straps and bags. He also stated that 5 million tanned hides and dyed sheep skins were exported to Tripoli. Cloth exports amounted to an estimated USD 120,000, 1,500 camel loads of 3–400 weights each and about 2–3,000 tons a year. Large-scale enterprises were organzied by merchants such as Tulu Babba whose business peaked in the 1850s. He owned fifteen slave estates, a family estate, trading agents in four Emirates and a factor in Gonja. Although rarer, some women established textile manufacturing enterprises through woman-to-woman marriages which enabled them to acquire raw materials and labor for production.

== Finance ==
=== Credit and Currency ===
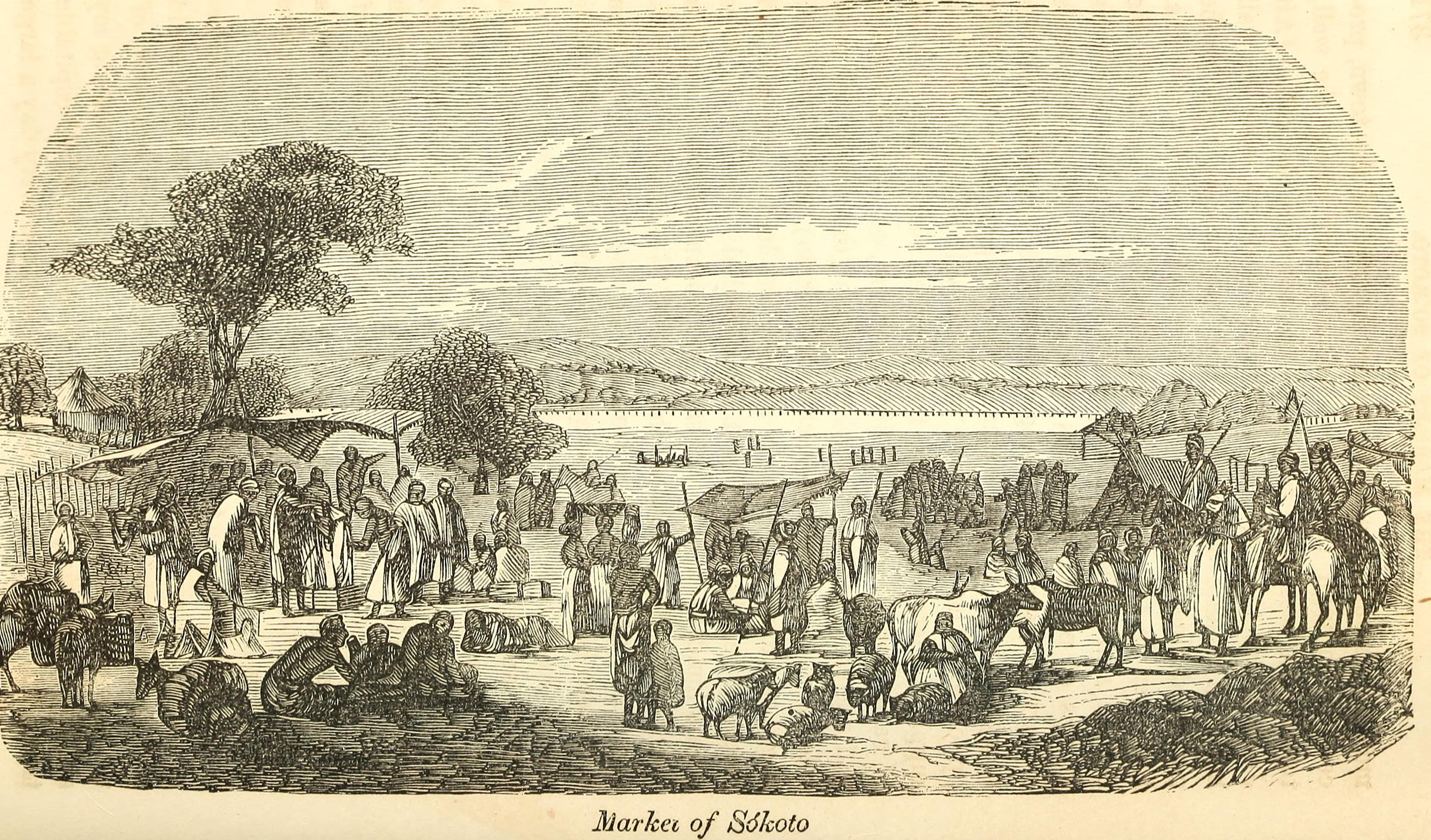
Market in Sokoto in the mid-19th century.

Multiple currencies existed such as cowrie shells, cloth strips, Maria Theresa and other silver coins. It was in the mid 19th century that cowries suffered a 25 percent devaluation compared to the silver dollar. Taxation in the Sokoto Caliphate was based on Islamic law with differing variations among the Emirates. The most essential tax was the zakkat tithe on cereal which was paid at the end of the farming season. In addition, the Emirates of the Caliphate were required required to send goods or currencies to the Sultan.

According to scholar Candotti (2023), Sokoto merchants created an "imaginary money" to serve as a unit of account like the ounce or mithqal as a result of the coexistence of multiple currencies. Silver dollar was the main medium used on long-distance trade. A bill of exchange system also existed in Sokoto.

The existence of Sleeping partnerships have been documented. Agents and brokerage houses were available to provide temporary lodging, storage facilities, credit guarantees and brokerage services.

=== Trade ===
The Caliphate was involved in trade routes across the Trans-Sahara, Niger and Benue River. In the 19th century, Hausa traders obtained kola from the Asante Empire in exchange for textiles and leather goods. This trade route preceded the formation of Sokoto, but it expanded upon the rise of the Caliphate. A caravan trip from Kano to Asante could take half to one year, with one–two thousand merchants in the trade party. By the 1830s, the Asante government restricted and confined the Hausa traders to Salaga and other markets north of the Volta.
