= List of ecoregions in Nigeria =

The biogeographic regionalization of Earth's terrestrial biodiversity, known as Terrestrial Ecoregions of the World (TEOW), is made up of 867 ecoregions that are divided into 14 biomes. In addition to offering a comprehensive map of terrestrial biodiversity, TEOW also provides a global species database for ecological analyses and priority setting, a logical biogeographic framework for large-scale conservation strategies, a map for enhancing biogeographic literacy, and a foundation for the Global 200.

Similarly, another author indicated that there are 14 distinct biomes, including forests, grasslands, and deserts, among the 846 ecoregions that make up the area. Ecoregions vary in size; the island group of St. Peter and St. Paul Rocks in the Atlantic Ocean is only 6 km^{2} (2.3 sq mi), while the East Siberian Taiga is 39,000,000 km^{2} (15,000,000 sq mi).

According to the Worldwide Fund for Nature, the following is a list of ecoregions in Nigeria.

== Terrestrial ecoregions ==
by major habitat type

=== Tropical and subtropical moist broadleaf forests ===
- Cameroonian Highlands forests
- Cross–Niger transition forests
- Cross–Sanaga–Bioko coastal forests
- Niger Delta swamp forests
- Nigerian lowland forests

=== Tropical and subtropical grasslands, savannas, and shrublands ===
- East Sudanian savanna
- Guinean forest–savanna mosaic
- Mandara Plateau mosaic
- Northern Congolian forest-savanna mosaic
- Sahelian Acacia savanna
- West Sudanian savanna

=== Montane grasslands and shrublands ===
- Jos Plateau forest–grassland mosaic

=== Flooded grasslands and savannas ===
- Lake Chad flooded savanna

=== Mangroves ===
- Central African mangroves

== Freshwater ecoregions ==
by bioregion

=== Nilo-Sudan ===
- Bight Coastal
- Lake Chad Catchment
- Lower Niger-Benue
- Niger Delta

=== West Coastal Equatorial ===
- Northern West Coastal Equatorial

== Marine ecoregions ==
- Gulf of Guinea Central
