= Gamsole =

Nigerian video game start-up

- Industry: Mobile game production
- Founded: April 2012; 14 years ago
- Founder: Abiola Olaniran

Gamsole is a Nigerian start-up which produces mobile games. Gamsole was founded by Abiola Olaniran in April 2012.

== History ==
Founded in the year 2012 by Abiola Olaniran, a Google Student Ambassador and Computer Science graduate from the Obafemi Awolowo University who emerged Nigeria's Microsoft Imagine Cup Winner in 2010 and became a world finalist of the student competition in the same year. Abiola also won the Samsung Developer Challenge.

As at February 2015, the games had been downloaded over 10 million times across 191 countries in Africa, Asia, Europe and South America. Company has created more than 35 games. Among Gamsole games are Gidi Run, Temple Run, Monster Ninja, Sweet Candy.
