= Nigeria Internet Registration Association =

Organisation in Nigeria

Nigeria Internet Registration Association (NIRA)
- Founded: 23 March 2005; 21 years ago
- Type: Multi-stakeholder association
- Purpose: Managing Nigeria's top-level domain (.ng)
- Location: Nigeria
- Key people: Muhammed Rudman, President; Eyitayo Iyortim, Chief Operating Officer
- Website: http://www.nira.org.ng

The Nigeria Internet Registration Association (NIRA) oversees Nigeria's country code top-level domain, .ng. Registration of domain names are handled by NIRA certified registrars. It uses the Registry–Registrar–Registrant model in operating and managing the top-level domain.

== History ==
The Nigeria Internet Registration Association was initially founded by a stakeholder-led organisation. The stakeholders were within Nigeria's Internet Community. It was later transferred to the current management as it became important for national resources to be handled by a government coordinated institution, National Information Technology Development Agency handled the transfer on behalf of the Federal Government of Nigeria.

It became an Incorporated Trustee on 9 February 2007 and currently has the following as Trustees: Sir Chima Onyekwere (Chairman), Mrs. Ibukun Odusote (Sec), Dr. Chris Nwannenna, Prof (Mrs.) Adenike Osofisan, Mr. Shina Badaru, Dr. Isaac Adeola Odeyemi, Yunusa Zakari Ya’u, and Barrister Emmanuel Edet.

== Responsibilities ==
The Nigeria Internet Registration Association is responsible for the top level Domain .ng and also the following .mil.ng, .com.ng, .sch.ng, .gov.ng, .edu.ng, .i.ng, .net.ng through their accredited registrar.

== .NG Awards ==
The .ng Awards, organised by the Nigeria Internet Registration Association (NiRA), is an annual event that recognises and celebrates outstanding innovations and contributions to Nigeria's digital landscape. The awards aim to promote the .ng domain, driving growth in Nigeria's internet space and digital economy.

In the 2024 .NG Awards (7th Edition), organisations such as Sterling Bank (Nigeria), Jumia, Geeky Nigeria, The Guardian (Nigeria), and others emerged winners.
