= Internet in Nigeria =

Internet in Nigeria has grown rapidly in recent years, reaching 109.2 million users as of January 2022. Most of the internet users access the web through mobile devices, accounting for over 84 percent of the penetration rate. However, only 12 percent of Nigerians have adequate access to the internet as of May 2022, due to factors such as affordability, availability, and quality of service. The government and the private sector have been investing in internet infrastructure to improve the connectivity and speed of the internet in Nigeria, especially in rural areas. One of the indicators of the progress is the increase in broadband penetration, which reached 41.6 percent in January 2022, meaning that more than 40 percent of the population had access to fixed or mobile broadband services. One of the notable initiatives in this regard is the partnership between Tizeti, a Nigerian internet service provider (ISP) that uses solar-powered towers, and Microsoft Corporation, to provide high-speed airband internet infrastructure in Oyo State, Nigeria.

A subsea internet cable passing through Portugal and South Africa was linked to Lagos State by Google as part of its drive to boost internet connectivity in Nigeria and Africa.

The outbreak of coronavirus (COVID-19) in 2020 led to an increase in the number of active internet users in Nigeria as those that seem uninterested in getting access to internet were seen opting for internet connectivity as a result of several forms of restrictions from the government. There is a 4.6 percent increase of Internet use in Nigeria between 2021 and 2022 while the internet penetration is 51percent of the total population in January 2022, while 17.38 Mbit/s and 10.06 Mbit/s are the internet connection speed for mobile and fixed internet connection speed for the first quarter of 2022.

The Nigerian Communication Commission (NCC) is saddled with the responsibility of coordinating, regulating and issuing licenses to broadband Internet service providers. The Global system for mobile Telecommunication association, an association of all mobile internet access providers in the first quarter of 2022, has asked politicians to address the issue of imbalance between network operators and internet service providers as the market value hits $6.7 trillion 341.7million domain name Registration as .Ng declined in the fourth quarter of 2021 Google global service Nigeria in partnership with the Nigerian Communication Commission (NCC) are in partnership to provide broadband internet connectivity to the teeming population in Nigeria as the significance of such gesture will bring about a boost in Nigeria's Digital economy. The internet has fully been embraced in Nigeria, As at January 2025, the population of active internet users has shut up to 107 million. Social media users for YouTube is 27 million while Facebook 38.7 million, Instagram 9.9 million and Tiktok 37.4 million.

== History ==
The history of Internet in Nigeria started with the provision of limited E-mail service in 1991, and in July 1995 the Regional Information Network of Africa (RINAF) in collaboration with Rose Clayton Nigeria Limited provided internet service at the computer science department of Yaba College of Technology through the (Nigerian Postal Service (NIPOST)). The Internet service provided included email, Telnet and Gopher.

In 1998, there was more access to the internet as the government granted licenses to GSM(Global system for mobile communications) and Telecommunication companies in 2001 which led to an increase in internet connectivity. Towards the end of 2003 Nigeria had about 750,000 active internet users.

In 1999, The African Internet summit(AFRINET'99) was held in collaboration with the Federal Ministry of Communication and the Nigerian Communication Commission with the Nigerian Internet Group to create a forum where internet practitioners in Africa can come together to discuss a common front on policies that are peculiar to internet connectivity and access in Africa as well as sustainable development and use of Internet in Africa. The summit which was held in ECOWAS secretariat in Abuja Nigeria also had financial aid from the United Nations Development Programme agency (UNDP), they provided $1millions dollars to assist the Nigerian Telecommunication (NITEL) to establish the internet backbone and NITEL's training school to be an international regional training center for internet related programs. Internet users increased in 1999 to about 100,000 subscribers with about 81 host sites which covered research, academic, government, commercial and internationally related areas. However, during this period only the urban areas in Nigeria were covered and having internet connectivity like Lagos, Abuja, Port Harcourt and the likes, the rural areas even though had a little of GSM usage lacked internet connectivity as those rural areas where's not adequately covered as the ISP providers were only focused more on urban centers where acceptance and usage was high as well as the revenue generated, many of ISP providers were not interested in the rural areas as they claim the people were not literate enough to embrace technology, so preferred to channel their infrastructure mainly to urban areas which led to rise in internet connectivity majorly in the urban part of the county.

In 2001 about one hundred and fifty (150) ISP were given license by the Nigerian Communication Commission(NCC), Some of the ISP provided internet service on a frequency of 2.4 and 5.8 GHz using ISM(Industrial, scientific and medical) band which NCC prevented the commercial use of it. Several ISPs offered internet service on 3.5 GHz and WIFI which enabled internet access network using VSAT. In 2003 cyber cafes were connected to the internet either through dial up connections or VSAT and the Cafes were allowed to provide VOIP(Voice over internet protocol) service by NCC.

== Internet service providers in Nigeria ==
1. Internet Solutions Nigeria Limited
2. Swift Network
3. Suburban Broadband limited
4. 21st Century limited
5. Radical Technology network limited
6. CyberSpace Network Limited
7. Main one cable
8. Tizeti
9. VDT Communications
10. IPNX
11. Spectranet
12. Fibre one
13. Ntel
14. Cobranet limited
15. Global Communication Limited
16. MTN Nigeria
17. Cool link
18. Astramix Limited
19. Netcom Africa limited
20. Dotmac technologies limited
21. T2 (formerly 9mobile)
22. Airtel network

== Internet growth in Nigeria ==
Between October and November 2021, Nigeria's teledensity moved to 101.2 percent with new 1.23 million subscribers.

Internet subscribers increased with about 14.03 million in fourth quarter of 2021.

In the first quarter of 2022 Nigeria's internet subscription increased by 2.7%.

Nigerian government proposes a regulatory frame work for Internet of things (IOT).

As of May 2022 Nigeria has about 190 Internet Service provider. Mainone one of the Active internet service providers in Nigeria has launched its open accessed submarine cable which will span 14,000 kilometers and provide international internet connectivity to Nigerians.

The Southwest of Nigeria is ahead of other parts of the country in internet connectivity as 552,667 new subscribers were connected to the internet via ISP in the first quarter of 2022. Internet user penetration in Nigeria for 2022 is 38.73%. About 7 million new subscribers joined the internet access connection in November 2021 Which led to an increase in the number of Internet users in the country. However towards the end of 2021 there was a ban by the federal government of Nigeria in the sales of SIM cards to prospective subscribers in other to get those had already gotten their SIMs to be fully registered so that the government could curb the menace of insurgency by Boko Haram and kidnapping activities which was becoming rampant as they used the SIMs for communication, these led to a reduction in the number of active users of the internet until the ban was eased in the first quarter of 2022 and Its expected that there will be a growth of about 60% of Internet penetration before 2026.

MTN, one of the major ISP in Nigeria, has launched the 5G network on the 24 of August, 2022, the 5G service will be provided in Lagos, Abuja, Port-harcourt, Ibadan, Kano, Owerri, Maiduguri which are some of the major cities in Nigeria, those with enabled devices will be allowed to use the service as the ISP is at the testing stage of the network. The implementation of the access to these 5G network will increase the pace for the realization of the national targets in the Nigerian National Broadband Plan with the National Digital Economy Policy and Strategy and also other policies designed to improve Nigeria's digital transformation.

== Internet security in Nigeria ==
Cybercrime is a prevailing issue in Nigeria's internet space as the country is not left out in this world threat with millions lost to cyber criminals. Nigeria is ranked 43 among nations that commit cybercrime in the world with financial scam or fraud as one its major cybercrime being perpetrated in the cyber Space. As a result of the spike in cyber fraud the government of Nigeria in 2003 established the National Cyber security initiative (NCI) and the Nigerian cybercrime working group (NCWG) to curb cybercrimes and provide cyber security. The Nigerian Communications Commission which is under the Federal Ministry of Communications and Digital economy is saddle with the responsibility of providing a crime free cyber space for the teeming internet users and part of their activities is to drop a road map and activate a structure and process to curb cybercrimes most especially the financial fraud perpetrated during online transactions.

Cyber security toolkit has been designed by the federal government of Nigeria to over 41 million Micro, small and medium business enterprise (MSMEs) to protect their online activities. Some of the top cyber security firms in Nigeria includes DreamLab Nigeria limited, CyberSOC, BlackSentry, Ethnos, DataSixth, Chert Security, Rhythex consulting, one alliance, Silexsecure, Xown solutions limited, Web365 Nigeria, Metronet, SData west Africa, Telnol which makes Nigeria to be ranked 75 out of 175 counties making efforts in curbing cybercrimes.

The Nigerian Communications Commission's Computer Security Incident Response Team (NCC-CSIRT) has urged organisations( Firms and businesses) to ensure that cyber security measures are taken seriously to curb cyber crime that has experienced a spike in August 2022. several measures like employees use strong and unique passwords is key to preventing cyber attack on every account as well as the use of multi-factor authentication (2FA), which can protect from ransomware attacks with regular systems backup.

71% of Nigerian business were exposed to ransomware attack in first quarter of 2021.

In a bid to provide a smart, secured and sustainable nation, ESET is set to provide a 5G network for major cities across Nigeria. With the volume of financial transactions from January to August 2022 amounting to 554.4 billion dollars, there was an adequate need for improved cyber security.

== See also ==
- Digital divide in Nigeria
- Telecommunication in Nigeria
